= Correspondence of Lorraine toponyms in French and German =

The various toponyms in the historical region of Lorraine are often known by very different names depending on the language in which they are expressed. This article provides an understanding of the linguistic and historical origin of this diversity and lists a number of correspondences for communes and lesser localities in the four departments of the former region: Meuse, Meurthe-et-Moselle, Moselle, and Vosges.

== Exonyms and endonyms ==
In the context of toponyms, and with regard to the scope of this article, exonyms and endonyms are the differing external and internal names, respectively, used by different languages or cultures for a specific geographic place. For the people that speak German and live in Germany, for example, Deutschland is their endonym for that country. Conversely, Allemagne is the exonym in French, 'Germany' is the exonym in English, and so on.

The same idea can apply within a country too, between regions having vastly different linguistical and cultural histories. The emphasis in this article is on those toponyms that began as Gallo-Roman endonyms in some cases, but more often as endonyms following the Germanic migrations, and particularly what emerged from the Merovingian and Carolingian dynasties. Now, more than a millennium later, many of these toponyms have three different names—in Lorraine Franconian, French, and German—due to shifts in culture and language and changes in land possession.

== Linguistic aspects of toponyms in Lorraine ==
=== The 'determinant-determined' of the Romano-Francs ===
The origin of toponyms, of which exonyms are a certain type, is sometimes controversial, especially in Lorraine where successive or simultaneous occupations by different peoples and changes in culture have often influenced toponymy more than elsewhere.

As in all regions marked by Germanic influence, adjectives or appellatives often precede nouns. Many toponyms are formed with the name of a local lord or land owner. In some cases, however, a particular topographical, religious, or historical aspect may have played a more important role, which is difficult to determine in Gallo-Romance formations in particular. While Gallic toponyms are often poorly clarified due to insufficient knowledge of the language, Romanesque toponyms often play the role of those older Celtic toponyms that have been redesigned in the Romanesque style.

The Ripuarian and Salian Franks, and for some time also the Alemanni in eastern Lorraine, introduced Germanic toponyms. A patronymic practice of the Romano-Francs that developed from the Merovingian Dynasty was to merge Roman and Germanic habits. The Germanic rule of word composition from right to left (i.e. the decisive-determined order), largely governs the formation of Lorraine toponyms, both in Germanic and in Roman dialect.

For example, the Lorraine dialect places the adjective epithet before the noun it describes. A "white rupt" is a "white stream" (clear and transparent meaning). This is especially true for oronyms and toponyms in localities that make extensive use of local dialect. Gerardmer (Giraumouè) is the "Lake of Gerold", which can therefore be translated in the same order in German language: Geroldsee. The use of Geroltzsee is attested locally as early as 1484.

This information is fundamental in Romanesque toponymy and the determining-defined order, sometimes misunderstood, is the rule in Normandy (except Avranchin), Picardy, Nord-Pas-de-Calais, Champagne-Ardenne, northern Franche-Comté and Île-de-France, so it is not surprising that this method of composition is present in Romanesque Lorraine.

In the west and south, the reverse order — determined-determinant — is more dominant. Thus, for example, names like Neufchâteau, Neufchâtel, Neuville, and Neubourg du nord have opposite construction to Chateauneuf, Castelnau, Villeneuve, and Bourgneuf further south. Even if a Lorrain does not feel completely at home in Flanders because of the Flemish forms (-kerque, -em, -hem, -hout, -brouck, -berghe, -dorp) largely different from German forms, and even more so in Normandy with the Anglo-Norroese appellatives (-crique-, -ham, -londe, brique- [?], hougue / hogue, Torp(s) / -tour(ps)), they can easily feel a common practice (-kirch, -om, -heim, -holtz, -bruck, -berg, -troff / -droff).

In German-speaking Lorraine, the word dorf (for 'village') is often passed to troff by hardening from /d/ to /t/ and metathesis from /r/.

The toponyms in -angel (Common Germanic -ing) are typically Lorrainian and correspond to a relatively recent decline in Germanic speaking in Lorraine. Elsewhere this form is exceptional except in Luxembourg and the Luxembourgish part of Wallonia. In Flanders and Artois, -inge, -in, -ain, its correspondents, are also the expression of a decline in the Flemish language or at least a desire to make toponyms more Gallicized. In the Romanesque area, where Germanic speakers disappeared very early, the suffix is found in the forms -ans in Franche-Comté or Burgundy, in the southwest and a little in Languedoc in the forms -eins, -ens, -ein and sometimes also -ans. This suffix is much rarer in the west, where it sometimes takes the form of -an or -angles. Its absence is remarkable in northern Picardy, a region where Romanesque toponymy is the most "Germanized" in France.

Paradoxically, in Romanesque Lorraine, there is no common series of calls in the north and northwest, whose Germanic origin is proven. Thus, these types are not frequently found:

- Husdinium of *husidinja (shelter) in Hodeng, Hodent, Houdan, Hesdin...
- hlar (wasteland) in Mouflers, Flers, Meulers...
- ala(c)h (temple) in Neauphe, Neaufles, Neauphle or Niafles, and Boffles, Bouafles...
- afisna / avisna (pasture) in Avesnes, Avernes...
- *Rosbaki (reed stream) has evolved in Frankish Lorraine in Rohrbach, Rorbach, elsewhere in the north and northwest, and there are Robecq, Rebecques, Rebais, or Rebets...

You can find toponyms in short from the Doubs to Normandy, from Ile-de-France to Walloon Belgium. The -court toponyms have been chronologically replaced by the -ville toponyms, of which Romanesque Lorraine is the second 'provider' after Normandy and before the exceptional area of Beauce. There are also some in the Charentes and in the southwest around Toulouse.

=== Lorraine diglossia ===
Independent ducal Lorraine included a Bailiwick of Germany that crossed the current Moselle border to the north. The Lorraine Romans referred to all those who spoke a Germanic dialect as 'Germans' as opposed to their Romance language. So a German (or Ollemand) for a Romanesque Lorrain can also be a Lorrain of the Bailiwick of Germany or an Alsatian, or any person living beyond that. Conversely, neighbouring German-speaking people often called the Welsches romanophones. This is also the case in Switzerland.

Lorraine's toponymy is not only a back-and-forth between the German and French forms more specific to the last two centuries. It is older, and shows a sensitivity common to all of eastern France where the 'determinant-determined' pair largely dominates while respecting habits and rules that ignore the heritage language.

In the Lorraine under the social structure of the Ancien Regime the coexistence of a Romanesque and Germanic form for the same place was not uncommon. It was only with the integration into France under Stanislaus and then under the Jacobin regime and Prussian imperialism that both language and toponyms took on a political, patriotic, symbolic and identity value. Previously, the Duke of Lorraine recognized the official existence of German and French on his lands at the risk of having to have the most important acts and charters translated one way or the other. In the regions of passage between the Germanic area and the Romanesque basin, the same place was named in the language of the respective speaker. This is the case for the toponym, Hautes Chaumes, in the Vosges, which is in a Vosges dialect and differs from the initial Alsatian dialect.

More than standard French, the Lorraine dialect allows a cross-reading of the region's toponyms and makes it possible to establish a correspondence between the two families of languages present on Lorraine's territory. This is one of Lorraine's unique characteristics, its function as a language buffer region, or space between.

== Historical aspects of toponyms in Lorraine ==
=== Definition of terms ===
The subject of terms is very sensitive. It is linked to recent history, therefore the definition of terms is important.

Since that which is Germanic cannot be 'Germanized', the term "Germanization" for the periods 1870-1918 and 1940-1945 should be understood as an adaptation of form or graphics to standard German as intended by the heads of state of the last German empires. The Anglo-Saxons speak here rather of 'prussification' to avoid confusion. Moreover, many Moselle toponyms, characteristic of the Franconian Lorraine dialect, also exist in Germany or Austria. For a Francophone, Merlebach is objectively no less Germanic than Merlenbach.

The phenomenon is not specific to Moselle, a large part of Germany, especially in the south, had to willingly adopt standard German names for their official signs, but on the ground, the inhabitants continued to designate their village in the local form. No one is expecting to see 'Stuegert' on a city sign instead of Stuttgart today. Even today, an Alsatian and a Mosellan have their local form to designate their agglomeration. This also applies to village names in Lorraine dialect and beyond for all regions of France in local languages and dialects.

The difference is that Moselle suffered the arrival of 'prussification' as a denial of its specificity in view of the brutality of certain measures that followed the de facto annexation after the abandonment of the territories by the parliament meeting in Bordeaux in May 1871. This annexation was difficult to experience throughout the annexed Moselle because of the desire to 'prussify' Moselle by erasing its specificities. This was experienced as a constraint even in the Lorraine-Franco-speaking (Germanic) areas. It must also be said that part of the annexed Moselle known as Bezirk Lothringen, has always been Romanesque, mainly Metzgau and Saulnois except formerly the Dieuze region. Here, the Germanization of the toponym is an indisputable fact (Fresnes - Eschen). The locals were forced to change their names. This is why it must always be borne in mind that the phenomenon of "Germanization" does not cover the same thing depending on whether you start from an original Romanesque or historically Germanic toponym.

French and Lorraine Franconian (and Alsatian in Alsace) serve to make an ideological and political break with everything that sounds 'Prussian' or 'standardized German', because the occupants forbade or fought them. Thus, a simple 'n' at the end of a local toponym is enough to "Germanize" it when it is Germanic: Thedinge becomes Thedingen. At the same time, French Francizes the name by removing the dialectal 'e' to give Théding. The accent adds a little more gallicity. As well, it frequently reverses the names from -er to -re. Diacritical signs such as accents and umlauts have indeed played a role in francization or Germanization (e.g. Buding / Büdingen). Similarly, the accentuation of names is central. Lorraine Franconian and German emphasize the same linguistic relationship, placing a tonic accent at the initial of words, in general. On the other hand, the French name is unemphasized and is characterized by an increase in tone on the final part of the word. The difference between the Germanic and French form is audible.

=== Waves of francization and germanization ===
In the south of the Pays de Nied, there are current toponyms using -court that were formerly -troff / -torff. For example, Arraincourt from Armestroff, Thicourt from Diederstroff, Thonville from Oderstroff, Hernicourt (in Herny) from Hermerstorf.

At the time of the Ancien Régime, referring to the sociopolitical system that prevailed in France for the two centuries preceding and up to the French Revolution, several Lorraine towns were recognized by two names, one in French and one in German. The following name-pair examples are found the dictionaries of Henri Lepage and Ernest de Bouteiller, respectively, and noted as recognized in 1594:

- Mulcey was (fr) Mellecey alias (de) Metzingen
- Zommange was (fr) Semanges alias (de) Simingen
- Chemery-les-Deux was (fr) Clsmey alias (de) Schomberg
- Les Étangs was (de) Tenchen alias (fr) Lestanche
- Macker was (de) Machern alias (fr) Maizières
- Many was (de) Niderheim alias (fr) Magny
- Morhange was (fr) Morhanges alias (de) Morchingen
- Ottonville was (de) Ottendorf alias (fr) Ottonville
- Roupeldange was (de) Rupplingen alias (fr) Ruppeldanges
- Suisse was (fr) Xousse alias (de) Soultzen
- Varize was (fr) Warize alias (de) Weybelsskirchen
- Pontigny, was (de) Nidbrücken alias (fr) Pont de Niet

These were certainly not the only spellings before or after 1594. The history for Pontigny, for example, a locality (or hamlet) in the commune Condé-Northen since 1810, is attested as:

- (de) Bruque 1339
- (de) Brücke 1485
- (de) Nydbrück alias (fr) Pont de Nied by the 16th century
- (de) Nidbrück and (fr) Pontnied in 1542
- (de) Nidbrücken alias (fr) Pont de Niet in 1594
- (de) Niedbruch in 1606
- (de) Niedbroug by the 17th century
- (fr) Pontigni 1756
- (fr) Poutigny 1793
- (de) Niedbrücken 1940-44
- (fr) Pontigny ever since

There were further name or spelling differences in the centuries prior, after localities were formed under the Frankish dynasties up to when first attestations are known.

The names of many communes in Moselle were Francized at the end of the Revolution, in particular those having the suffix -engen or -ingen, which was sometimes simplified into -ing or definitively replaced by the Romanesque form in -ing (e.g. -ingen was Romanized into -ingas and -inges since the Middle Ages, hence -ang). While in Bas-Rhin -ingen was preserved. To a lesser extent, this suffix has also been Francized over the centuries in other forms, including -ang, -in, -court, -gny, and so forth.

The toponyms in German-speaking Moselle were often spelled -willer (sometimes -weiller) in the Bulletins des lois and several dictionaries from the 19th century until 1870. This form subsequently disappeared in the 20th century, after the World Wars. While in Alsace, the -willers were preserved, although they were sometimes mentioned -viller and -viler in 1793–1801.

Some municipalities had a standard German name between 1793 and 1802, such as Folschviller (Folschweiler 1793), Ébersviller (Ebersweiler 1793), Berviller-en-Moselle (Berweiler 1793), Schmittviller (Schmittweiler 1793), Bisten-en-Lorraine (Bisten im Loch 1793), Château-Rouge (Rothdorf 1793), Mouterhouse (Mutterhausen 1801), Soucht (Sucht 1801), Rodalbe (Rodalben 1801), Merlebach (Merlenbach 1801), Dalem (Dalheim 1801), Altrippe (Altrippen 1793).

The dictionaries of Henri Lepage on the Meurthe and Ernest de Bouteiller on the Moselle, written before 1871, prove that many municipalities still had an alias in German during the 19th century. For example, Hagondange, Haute-Vigneulles, and Lorquin cited 'in German' as Hagelingen, Oberfillen and Lœrchingen in these same dictionaries, most recently written in 1868. The Germanization of names by the Prussians from 1871 onwards is therefore not an invention (except in certain cases), which used old Germanic references, sometimes the latest one. For example Argancy Germanized in Argesingen during the World War II, refers to an old Germanic mention Argesinga dating from 848. and Chicourt Germanized as Diexingen (1915-1918) from the Diekesinga mention from 1121 and 1180 (-inga being the primitive form of -ingen).

All the toponyms in the department had been gradually Germanized in the German period of the Alsace-Lorraine. The place names of German-speaking Lorraine were first Germanized, adjectives (top, bottom...) were then translated, then the names of villages close to the linguistic boundary of Moselle and the last ones, including all those of French-speaking Moselle were Germanized on 2 September 1915 (e.g. Augny).

At the end of the First World War in 1918, these place names reverted to their pre-1870 version.

All toponyms are Germanised after the annexation of 1940, most of the time using their 1918 form or another more or less different one. They were re-Francized in 1945.

== Roman / Germanic correspondences ==
=== Comparison of Lorrain appellatives ===
Lorraine Roman form	German form	Lorraine Franconian form, if different	Meaning
	-brück	bréck, -brikk/-brigg, -brikke/-brigge	bridge
	-wiese	-wis, -wiss	prairie, meadow
-ange, -anges	-ing, -ingen	-éng, -éngen, -inge	
-bois	-wald, -holz	-holtz, -bësch	wooded, forest
-bourg, -bo	-burg	-burch, -bursch, -buerg, -buerj	castle, suburb, fortification
-celle(s)	-zell	=	small convent, hermitage, monastic cell
chaume	Alp, Alm	Màtt	near summerhouse
-château, -castel	-burg, -schloss	-kastel	castle, palace
-court, -co	-hof, -hofen	-hoff/-haff, -howen/-huewen	agricultural farm, rural hamlet
Dom-, -elize	-kirch, -kirchen	-kérch, -kérchen	church
-ey / -y	-ach / -ich	-éch / -och	property belongs to
-faing, -faigne	-wasen, -moor	=	peat bog, swamp
fontaine	-brunnen	-bronn, -born, -burre, -brunn	source, fountain
-gazon	-heide, -matte, -matt	=	heath, high altitude field (Vosges)
-rupt, -goutte	-bach	-boch, -béch, -baach	stream
-maisons, -granges	-haus, -hausen	-huse, -husen	hamlet, farm
Maizières, Maizière	Macheren, Machern	Maacher, Macher	mural, wall, ruin
-meix, -mouè, -mer	-garten	-gorten, -gotten	garden, cultivated land
-mer	-see	=	lake
-mont	-berg	-bierg, -bersch, -berj, -prich	summit, mountain, hill, raised area
-moutier	-münster	-munster, -minster	monastery, convent
-pierre	-stein	-sten	rocky summit, rocky area
tête	-kopf	=	summit, mountain
-val, -vaulx	-tal	-thal, -dal	valley
-ville, -velle	-hof, -dorf	-hoff, -troff, -droff, -trëf, -drëf, -duerf	rural domain, village
-viller(s), -villiers	-weiler	-willer, -weller	hamlet, a distance in wooded area

=== Toponymic correspondences with communes in Meuse ===
- Commercy (Kamersche)
- Étain (Stain)
- Han-sur-Meuse (Ham)

=== Toponymic correspondences with communes in Moselle ===
French	German
Aboncourt-sur-Seille	Abenhofen
Abreschviller	Abreschweiler
Achain	Eschen
Achen	Achen
Ackerbach	Ackerbach
Adelange	Adelingen
Adaincourt	Adinghofen
Aidling	Aidlingen
Albeschaux	Albschhofen
Albestroff	Albesdorf
Albing	Albingen
Algrange	Algringen
Alsting	Alstingen
Alteville	Altweiler
Althorn	Althorn
Altkirch	Altkirch
Altrippe	Altrip
Altroff	Altdorf
Alt-Schmelz	Alt Schmelz
Altviller	Altweiler
Alzing	Alzingen
Amanvillers	Amanweiler (1871-1918); Almansweiler (1940-1944)
Amelécourt	Almerichshofen
Amnéville	Ammenweiler
Ancerville	Anserweiler
Ancy-Dornot, formerly Ancy-sur-Moselle	Ansen an der Mosel (1871-1883);Ancy an der Mosel (1883-1915); Anzig (1915-1918; 1940-1944)
Angevillers	Arsweiler
Angviller-lès-Bisping	Angweiler
Anzeling	Anzelingen
Apach	Apach
Arlange	Arlingen
Arraincourt	Arnsdorf
Arriance	Argenheim
Arry	Arry (1871-1915); Arrich (1915-1918): Aringen (1940-1944)
Ars-Laquenexy	Ars bei Kenchen
Ars-sur-Moselle	Ars an der Mosel
Arzviller	Arzweiler
Aspach	Aspach
Assenoncourt	Essesdorf
Attilloncourt	Edelinghofen
Aube	Alben
Audun-le-Tiche	Deutsch Oth
Audviller	Ottweiler
Augny	Auning (1915-1918); Auningen (1940-1944)
Aulnois-sur-Seillle	Erlen
Aumetz	Aumetz
Avricourt	Deutsch-Avricourt (1871-1915), Elfringen (1915–18; 1940–44)
Ay-sur-Moselle	Aich an der Mosel
Azoudange	Anslingen (1915-1918), Aßlingen (1940-1944)
Bacourt	Badenhofen
Baerenthal	Bärenthal
Ballering	Balleringen
Bambesch	Bambesch
Bambiderstroff	Baumbiedersdorf
Bannay	Bizingen
Bannstein	Bannstein
Ban-St-Jean	Ban-St. Johann
Barchain	Barchingen
Baronville	Baronweiler
Barst	Barst
Hoste-Bas	Niederhost
Basse-Ham	Niederham
Basse-Rentgen	Nieder Rentgen
Basse-Vigneulles	Nieder Fillen
Bassing	Bessingen
Bassompierre	Bettstein
Baudrecourt	Baldershofen
Bazoncourt	Bettstein
Bébing	Bebingen
Bédestroff	Beidersdorf
Béchy	Bechingen
Befey	Befey
Behren-lès-Forbach	Behren
Bellange	Bellingen
Belles-Forêts	Angweiler and Bisping
Bénestroff	Bensdorf
Béning-lès-Saint-Avold	Beningen
Béning	Beningen
Grostenquin	Großtänchen
Berg-sur-Moselle	Berg a.d. Mosel
Bérig	Berig
Berling	Berlingen
Bermering	Bermeringen
Berthelming	Berthelmingen (1871–1918), Bartolfingen (1940-1944)
Bertrange	Betringen
Berviller-en-Moselle	Berweiler
Besville	Besweiler
Bettange	Bettingen
Bettborn	Bettborn
Bettelainville	Bettendorf; Bettsdorf
Betting	Bettingen
Betting-lès-Saint-Avold	Bettingen
Bettring	Bettringen
Bettviller	Bettweiler
Beuvange-sous-Justemont	Bevingen unter Justberg
Beuvange-s/s-St-Michel	Bevingen vor St. Michel
Beux	Niederbö and Oberbö
Bévange	Bevingen
Beyren-lès-Sierck	Beiern
Bezange-la-Petite	Klein-Bessingen
Biberkirch	Biberkirch
Bibiche	Bibisch
Bickenholtz	Bickenholz
Bidestroff	Biedesdorf
Biding	Büdingen
Bining	Biningen
Bioncourt	Bionshofen
Bionville-sur-Nied	Bingen
Bisten-en-Lorraine	Bisten Im Loch; Bisten in Lothringen; Bisten am Mottenberg
Bisping	Bispingen
Bistroff	Bischdorf
Bitche	Bitsch
Bizing	Bisingen
Blanche-Église	Weißkirchen
Blancrupt	Blancupt
Blettange	Blettingen
Bliesbruck	Bliesbrücken
Blies-Ébersing	Bliesebersingen
Blies-Guersviller	Bliesgersweiler
Bionville-sur-Nied	Bingen a.d. Nied
Bocknang	Bocknang
Boler	Boler
Bonne-Fontaine	Gutenbrunnen
Boucheporn	Buschborn
Boulange	Bollingen
Boulay-Moselle	Bolchen
Bourgaltroff	Burgaltdorf
Bourg-Esch	Burg Esch
Bousbach	Buschbach
Bourscheid	Burscheid
Boussange	Bussingen
Bousse	Buss
Bousseviller	Bußweiler
Boust	Bust
Boustroff	Buschdorf
Bouzonville	Busendorf
Brandelfing	Brandelfingerhof
Brecklange	Brecklingen
Bréhain	Brehain
Breidenbach	Breidenbach
Breistroff-la-Grande	Breischdorf
Breistroff-la-Petite	Klein Breisdorf
Brementeile	Brementeile
Brettnach	Brettnach
Bromsenhoff	Bromsenhof
Brouck	Bruchen
Brouderdorff	Bruderdorf
Brouviller	Brauweiler
Brulange	Brülingen
Buchelberg	Buchelberg
Buchy	Buchingen
Budange-sous-Justemont	Büdingen unter Justberg
Buding	Büdingen
Budling	Bidlingen
Buhl-Lorraine	Bühl in Lothringen
Bure	Bure
Burlioncourt	Burlingshofen
Burtoncourt	Brittendorf
Cadenbronn	Cadenbronn
Cappel	Cappel
Carling	Karlingen
Castviller	Kastweiler
Cattenom	Kattenhofen
Chambourg	Schaumburg
Chambrey	Kambrich
Chanville	Hanhausen
Charleville-sous-Bois	Karlheim (1871), Karlsheim am Wald (1940-1944)
Château-Rouge	Rothendorf
Château-Salins	Salzburg
Château-Voué	Dürkastel
Châtel-Saint-Germain	Sankt German
Chemery-les-Deux	Schemberg; Schemmerich or Schemerich (1871-1918); Schomberg (1940-44)
Chenois	Eichendorf
Chérisey	Schersingen
Chesny	Kessenach
Chicourt	Schöllen
Clouange	Kluingen; Klingen
Cocheren	Kochern
Coincy	Konzich
Coin-lès-Cuvry	Kuberneck
Coin-sur-Seille	Selzeck
Colligny-Maizery	Colligny and Macheringen; Kollingen and Macheringen
Colmen	Colmen
Condé	Contchen
Conthil	Kontich
Contz-les-Bains	Bad Kontz
Corny-sur-Moselle	Corningen; Korningen
Cottendorff	Cottendorf
Coume	Kuhmen
Courcelles-Chaussy	Kurzel
Courcelles-sur-Nied	Courcelles an der Nied; Kurzel an der Nied
Craincourt	Kranhofen
Créhange	Kriechingen
Creutzwald	Kreuzwald
Cubolot	Kubelott
Cutting	Kuttingen
Cuvry	Kubern
Dabo	Dagsburg
Dalem	Dalem
Dalhain	Dalheim
Dalstein	Dalstein
Dam	Dam
Danne-et-Quatre-Vents	Dann und Vierwinden
Dannelbourg	Dannelburg
Daspich	Daspich
Dédeling	Dedelingen
Delme	Delm
Denting	Dentingen
Desseling	Desselingen
Destry	Destrich
Devant-les-Ponts	Devant-les-Ponts (merged into Metz)
Diane-Capelle	Dianen Kappel
Diderfing	Diederfingen
Diding	Didingen
Diebling	Dieblingen
Diding	Diedingen
Diesen	Diesen
Dieuze	Duß
Diffembach-lès-Hellimer	Diefenbach bei Hellmer
Diffenbach-lès-Puttelange	Dieffembach-Petelange
Distroff	Diesdorf
Dodenom	Dodenhofen
Dollenbach	Dollenbach
Dolving	Dolvingen
Domnom-lès-Dieuze	Dommenheim
Donjeux	Domningen
Donnelay	Dunningen (1871-1918), Karpfendorf (1940-1944)
Dourd'hal	Dordal
Dorst	Dorst
Dorviller	Dorweiler
Drogny	Drechingen
Ebange	Ebingen
Ebersviller	Ebersweiler
Eblange	Eblingen
Ebring	Ebringen
Edange	Edingen
Edling	Edlingen
Éguelshardt	Egelshardt
Eich	Eich (part of Réding)
Eigenthal	Eigenthal
Eincheville	Enschweiler
Elange	Ellingen
Ellviller	Ellweiler (part of Loupershouse)
Elvange	Elwingen
Elzange	Elsingen
Elzing	Elsingen
Aboncourt	Endorf
Enchenberg	Enschenberg
Ennery	Ennerchen (1915-1918); Hochschloß (1940-1944)
Entrange	Entringen
Epping	Eppingen
Erbsenthal	Erbsenthal
Erching	Erchingen
Ernestviller	Ernstweiler
Erstroff	Ersdorf
Escherange	Escheringen
Erzange	Erzingen
Escherange	Escheringen
Eschviller	Eschweiler
Esing	Esingen
Etting	Ettingen
Etzling	Etzlingen
Evange	Ewingen
Evendorff	Evendorf
Evrange	Ewringen
Failly	Failen
Falck	Falk
Faux-en-Forêt	???
Fameck	Fameck
Farébersviller	Pfarrebersweiler
Farschviller	Farschweiler
Faulbach	Faulbach
Faulquemont	Falkenberg
Fénétrange	Finstingen
Férange	Fehringen
Feriendal	Feriental
Féy	Feriental
Filstroff	Filsdorf
Fixem	Fixem
Flastroff	Flasdorf
Flatten	Flatten
Fleisheim	Fleisheim
Flétrange	Fletringen
Fleury	Fletringen
Flocourt	Flörchingen
Florange	Flörchingen
Folkling	Folklingen
Folpersviller	Folpersweiler
Folschviller	Folschweiler
Fontoy	Fentsch
Forbach	Forbach
Fossieux	Fossingen
Foulcrey	Folkringen
Fouligny	Füllingen
Foville	Folkheim
Francaltroff	Freialtdorf
Fraquelfing	Fraukelfingen
Frauenberg	Frauenberg
Freching	Frückingen; Freckingen
Freistroff	Freisdorf
Frémery	Fremerchen (1915-1918); Fremersheim (1940-1944)
Frémestroff	Fremesdorf
Freudenberg	Freudenberg
Freybouse	Freibuß
Freyming-Merlebach	Freimingen-Merlenbach
Fribourg	Freiburg
Frohmuhle	Frohmühle
Gallenmuhle	Gallenmühle
Gallonier	Gallonier
Gandrange	Gandringen
Gandren	Gandern
Garche	Garsch
Garrebourg	Garburg
Gavisse	Gauwies (1871-1918), Gauwiesen (1940–1944)
Gaweistroff	Gaweisdorf
Gelucourt	Gisselfingen
Glasenberg	Glasenberg
Gerbécourt	Gerbertshofen
Givrycourt	Hampat (1915-1918); Gierenhofen (1940-1944)
Glatigny	Glatingen
Goetzenbruck	Götzenbrück
Goin	Göhn (1915-1918); Godingen (1940-1944)
Gomelange	Gelmingen
Gondrexange	Gunderchingen
Gongelfang	Gongelfangen
Gorze	Gorz (1915-1918); Gorschen (1940-1944)
Gosselming	Gosselmingen
Gravelotte	Gravelotte
Grand Roupelstouden	Groß Rupelstuden
Grand-Soldat	Soldatenthal
Gréning	Greningen
Grémecey	Gremsich
Grindorff	Grindorf
Grosbliederstroff	Großblittersdorf
Gros-Réderching	Großrederchingen
Grossmann	Großmann
Grostenquin	Großtänchen
Grundviller	Grundweiler
Guebenhouse	Gebenhausen
Guébestroff	Gebesdorf
Guéblange-lès-Dieuze	Güblingen
Guébling	Gebling
Guéling	Gelingen
Guentrange	Gintringen
Guenviller	Genweiler
Guermange	Germingen
Guerstling	Gerstlingen
Guerting	Gertingen
Guessling	Gesslingen
Guiching	Gichingen
Guiderkirch	Güderkirch
Guinglange	Gänglingen
Guinkirchen	Gehnkirchen
Guinzeling	Geinslingen
Guirlange	Girlingen
Guisberg	Güsberg (1871); Giesbergerhof (1878)
Guntzviller	Gunzweiler
Haboudange	Habudingen
Habsterdick	Habsterdick
Hackenberg	Hackenberg
Hagen	Hagen
Hagondange	Hagendingen
Hallering	Halleringen
Halling	Hallingen bei Pütlingen
Halling-lès-Boulay	Hallingen
Halmoze	???
Halstroff	Halsdorf
Hambach	Hambach
Hampont	Hudingen (1915–1918), Hüdingen (1940–1944)
Ham-sous-Varsberg	Ham unter Varsberg (1871-1918), Hamm unter Warsberg (1940–1944)
Hangviller	Hangweiler
Han-sur-Nied	Han an der Nied (1871-1918), Hann an der Nied (1940-1944)
Hannocourt	Handorf
Hanviller	Hanweiler
Haraucourt-sur-Seille	Haraldshofen
Hargarten-aux-Mines	Hargarten
Hargarten	Hargarten
Harprich	Harprich
Harreberg	Haarberg
Hartzviller	Harzweiler
Haselbourg	Haselburg
Haspelschiedt	Haspelschied
Hastroff	Hasdorf
Hattigny	Hattingen
Hauconcourt	Halkenhofen
Haut-Clocher	Zittersdorf
Haute-Ham	Oberham
Haute-Kontz	Ober Kontz
Haute-Rentgen	Ober Rentgen
Haute-Sierck	Ober Sierck
Haute-Vigneulles	Oberfillen
Hoste-Haut	Oberhost
Hoste-Bas	Niederhost
Havange	Havingen
Hayange	Hayingen
Hayes	Haiß
Hazembourg	Hassenburg
Heckenransbach	Heckenranschbach
Heckling	Hechlingen
Heiligenbronn	Heiligenbronn (part of Enchenberg)
Heining-lès-Bouzonville	Heiningen
Helfling	Helfling (part of Guinglange)
Hellering	Helleringen
Hellering-lès-Fénétrange	Helleringen
Hellert?	Hellert?
Hellimer	Helmer
Helling	Hellingen
Helstroff	Helsdorf
Hémering	Hemeringen
Hémilly	Hemming; Hemelich
Héming	Hemingen
Henridorff	Heinrichsdorf
Henriville	Herrchweiler
Hérange	Heringen
Hermelange	Hermelingen
Herny	Herlingen
Herrenwald	Herrenwald
Hertzing	Herzingen
Hessange	Hessingen
Hesse	Hessen
Hesseling	Hesselingen
Hestroff	Heßdorf
Hettange-Grande	Groß Hettingen
Hilbesheim	Hilbesheim
Hilsprich	Hilsprich
Himeling	Himlingen
Hinckange	Heinkingen
Hingsange	Hingsingen
Hinsing	Hinsingen
Hirbach	Hirbach
Hirps	Hirps
Hobling	Hoblingen
Hoelling	Höllingen
Hoenerhof	Hörnerhof
Holbach	Holbach
Holbach	Holbach
Holling	Hollingen
Holving	Holvingen
Hombourg-Bas	Nieder Homburg
Hombourg-Budange	Homburg b. Büdingen
Hombourg-Haut	Ober Homburg
Homeldange	Homeldingen
Hommarting	Hommartingen
Hommert	Hommert
Honskirch	Honskirch
Hottviller	Hottweiler
Huberville	???
Hultehouse	Hültenhausen
Hundling	Hundlingen
Hunting	Huntingen
Hussange	Hüssingen
Ibrick	Ibrick
Illange	Illingen
Imeldange	Imeldingen
Imling	Imlingen
Immerhof	Immerhof
Inglange	Inglingen
Insming	Insmingen
Insviller	Insweiler
Ippling	Ipplingen
Ising	Isingen
Itzing	Itzingen
Janau	Janau
Justemont	Justberg
Kalembourg	Kalemburg
Kalhausen	Kalhausen
Kaltweiller	Kaltweiler
Kanfen	Kanfen
Kapellenhof	Kapellenhof
Kappelkinger	Kappelkinger
Kédange-sur-Canner	Kedingen a.d. Kanner
Kemplich	Kemplich
Kerbach	Kerbach
Kerling-lès-Sierck	Kerlingen
Kerprich-aux-Bois	Kerpich im Wald
Ketzing	Ketzingen
Kirviller	Kirrweiler
Kirsch-Lès-Luttange	Kirch b. Lüttingen
Kirsch-lès-Sierck	Kirch b. Sierck
Kirschnaumen	Kirchnaumen
Kitzing	Kitzingen
Kleindal	Kleintal
Knutange	Knutingen
Kœking	Köckingen, Kechingen
Kœnigsmacker	Königsmachern
Koerperhoff	Körperhof
Konacker	Konacker
Kraftel	Kraftel
Kreutzkopf	Kreuzkopf
Kuntzig	Künzig
Kutzeling	Kützelingen
L'Espérance	Hoffnung
L'Hôpital	Spittel
La Breidt	Breidt
La Hardt	Hardt
La Hoube	Hub
La Marcarerie	Meierei
La Netz	Netz
La Valette	Obervalette
Lachambre	Kainern
Lacroix	Kreuz
Lafrimbolle	Lassemborn
Lallewald	Lallewald
Lambach	Lambach
Landange	Landingen
Landroff	Landorf
Laneuveville-lès-Lorquin	Neuendorf bei Lörchingen
Laneuveville-en-Saulnois	Neuheim in Lothringen
Langatte	Langd
Languimberg	Langenberg
Laning	Laningen
La-Poste-de-Hommarting	Hommartinger Posten
Laumesfeld	Laumesfeld
Launstroff	Launsdorf
Le Val-de-Guéblange	Geblingen
Légeret	???
Lelling	Lellingen
Lemberg	Lemberg
Lemestroff	Lemesdorf
Léning	Leiningen
Les Étangs	Tennschen
Lettenbach	Lettenbach
Leyviller	Leyweiler
Lhor	Lohr
Lidrequin	Linderchen
Lidrezing	Liedersingen
Liederschiedt	Liederscheidt
Lieschbach	Lieschbach
Lindre-Basse	Nieder Linder
Lindre-Haute	Ober Linder
Linstroff	Linsdorf
Lixheim	Lixheim
Lixing-lès-Rouhling	Lixingen
Lixing-lès-Saint-Avold	Lixingen
Logne	Leiserhof
Lommerange	Lommeringen
Longeville-lès-Saint-Avold	Lubeln
Lorquin	Lörchingen
Lostroff	Losdorf
Loudrefing	Lauterfingen
Loupershouse	Lupershausen
Loutremange	Lautermingen
Loutzviller	Lutzweiler
Loux	Luchs
Ludelange	Lüdelingen
Luttange	Lüttingen
Lutzelbourg	Lützelburg
Macheren	Machern
Macker	Macker
Mailanderberg	Mailänderberg
Mainvillers	Maiweiler
Maison Rouge	Rothaus
Malling	Mallingen
Mambach	Mambach
Mancy	Menchen
Manderen	Mandern
Manom	Monhofen
Many	Niederum
Marange	Maringen
Marange-Silvange	Maringen-Silvingen
Marienau	Marienau
Marivaux	???
Marspich	Marsprich
Marthille	Marthil
Maxstadt	Maxstadt
Mégange	Mengen
Meisenbruck	Meisenbrück
Meisenthal	Meisenthal
Menskirch	Menskirchen
Merschweiller	Merschweiler
Merten	Merten
Métaires-lès-St-Quirin	Quirinsweiler
Métrich	Metrich
Metring	Metringen
Metschbruck	Metschbrück
Metting	Mettingen
Metzeresche	Metzeresch
Metzerwisse	Metzerwiese
Metzing	Metzingen
Meyerhof	Meyerhof
Milberg	Milberg
Mittelbronn	Mittelbronn
Mittersheim	Mittersheim
Molring	Molringen
Molvange	Molwingen
Momerstroff	Momersdorf
Mondelange	Mondelingen
Mondorff	Mondorf
Monneren	Monneren
Montbronn	Mombronn
Mondidier	Diedersberg
Montenach	Montenach
Montigny-lès-Metz	Monteningen
Montrequienne	Monterchen
Morhange	Mörchingen
Morlange	Morlingen
Morlange-lès-Rémelange	Moerlingen
Morsbach	Morsbach
Morsbronn	Morsbronn
Moulin Neuf	Neumühle
Moulin	Mühle
Mouterhouse	Mutterhausen
Munster	Münster
Narbéfontaine	Memersbronn
Nébling	Neblingen
Nelling	Nellingen
Neudorf	Neudorf
Neufchef	Neuhäuser
Neufgrange	Neuscheuern
Neufmoulins	Neumühlen
Neufvillage	Neudörfel
Neumuhle	Neumühle
Neunkirch	Neunkirch
Neunkirchen-lès-Bouzonville	Neunkirchen b. Busendorf
Niderhoff	Niederhof
Niderviller	Niederweiler
Niederstinzel	Niederstinzel
Niedervisse	Niederwiese
Niedwelling	Niedwellingen
Nilvange	Nilvingen
Nolweiher	Nolweiher
Nondkeil	Nondkeil
Northen	Northen
Nousseviller-lès-Bitche	Nußweiler b. Bitsch
Nousseviller-Saint-Nabor	Nußweiler b. Saint-Nabor
Oberdorff	Oberdorf
Obergailbach	Obergailbach
Obermuhlthal	Obermühlthal
Obernaumen	Obernaumen
Oberstinzel	Oberstinzel
Obrick	Obrick
Odenhoven	Odenhoven
Oeting	Ötingen
Oeutrange	Ötringen
Ohrenthal	Ohrenthal
Olsberg	Olsberg
Opperding	Opperdingen
Ormersviller	Ormersweiler
Ottange	Ottingen
Ottonville	Ottendorf
Otzwiller	Otzweiler
Oudrenne	Udern
Parthe-Basse	Nieder Parth
Parthe-Haute	Ober Parth
Petit Chemery	Klein Schemern
Petit-Ebersviller	Klein Ebersweiler
Petit-Eich	Klein Eich
Petite-Rosselle	Kleinrosseln
Petit-Réderching	Kleinrederchingen
Petit-Tenquin	Klein Tänchen
Phalsbourg	Pfalzburg
Philippsbourg	Philippsburg
Piblange	Pieblingen
Plaine-de-Walsch	Hochwalsch
Plappecourt	Peblingen
Pontigny	Niedbrücken
Pontpierre	Steinbiedersdorf
Porcelette	Porcelette
Postroff	Postdorf
Preisch	Preisch
Puttelange-aux-Lacs	Püttlingen
Puttelange-lès-Thionville	Püttlingen
Racrange	Rakrigen
Rahling	Rahlingen
Ramstein	Ramstein
Ranguevaux	Rangwall
Raville	Rollingen
Rech (Sarralbe)	Rech
Réchicourt-le-Château	Rixingen
Rédange	Redingen
Redlach	Redlach
Réding	Rieding
Rehthal	Rehthal
Reinange	Reiningen
Remelange	Remelingen
Remeldorff	Remeldorf
Rémelfang	Remelfangen
Rémelfing	Remelfingen
Rémeling	Remelingen
Rémering	Remeringen
Rémering-lès-Puttelange	Remeringen
Réning	Reiningen
Reyersviller	Reyersweiler
Rhodes	Rodt
Richeling	Richlingen
Richemont	Reichersberg
Rimling	Rimlingen
Rinting	Rintingen
Riorange	Rioringen
Risholtz	Risholz
Ritzing	Ritzingen
Rochonvillers	Ruxweiler
Rodalbe	Rodalben
Rodemack	Rodemachern
Rodenbuhl	Rodenbühl
Rodlach	Rodlach
Rohrbach-lès-Bitche	Rohrbach b. Bitsch
Rombas	Rombach
Romelfing	Rommelfingen
Roppeviller	Roppweiler
Rorbach-lès-Dieuze	Rohrbach b. Duß
Rosbruck	Rosbrück
Rosselange	Rösslingen
Roth	Roth
Rouhling	Ruhlingen
Roupeldange	Rupeldingen
Roussy-le-Bourg	Burg Rüttgen
Roussy-le-Village	Rüttgen
Rurange-lès-Mégange	Rüringen
Rurange-lès-Thionville	Rüringen b. Diedenhofen
Russange	Rüssingen
Rustroff	Rüsdorf
Sarreinsberg	Saareinsberg
Saltzbronn	Salzbronn
Sarralbe	Saaralben
Sarraltroff	Saaraltdorf
Sarrebourg	Saarburg
Sarreguemines	Saargemünd
Sarreinsming	Saareinsmingen
Sarrewald	Saarwald
Schaeferhof	Schäferhof
Schalbach	Schalbach
Schell	Schell
Scheuerwald	Scheuerwald
Schieresthal	Schieresthal
Schmittviller	Schmittweiler
Schneckenbusch	Schneckenbusch
Schoeneck	Schöneck
Schreckling	Schrecklingen
Schwangerbach	Schwangerbach
Schweix	Schweix
Schweizerlaendel	Schweizerländel
Schwerdorff	Schwerdorf
Schweyen	Schweyen
Seingbouse	Sengbusch
Semming	Semmingen
Sentzich	Sentzich
Serémange	Seremingen
Servigny-lès-Raville	Silbernachen
Sierck-les-Bains	Bas Sierck
Siersthal	Siersthal
Silly-sur-Nied	Sillers
Simserhof	Simserhof
Singling	Singlingen
Sitifort	???
Soetrich	Sötrich
Sotzeling	Sotzelingen
Soucht	Sucht
Sparsbrod	Sparsbrod
Spicheren	Spichern
Saint-Avold	Sankt Avold
Saint-Bernard	Sankt Bernhard
Saint-Charles	Sankt Karl
Saint-Michel	Sankt Michel
Saint-Quirin	Sankt Quirin
Sainte-Anne	Sankt Anna
Sainte-Croix	Heligkreuz
Sainte-Elisabeth	Sankt Elisbeth
Steinbach	Steinbach
Steinbesch	Steinbesch
Saint-Jean-Kourtzerode	Sankt Johann-Kurzerode
Sainte-Marguerite	Sankt Margareth
Sainte-Suzanne	Sankt Susanna
Saint-François	Sankt Franz
Saint-François-Lacroix	Sankt Franz
Saint-Georges	Sankt Georg
Saint-Hubert	Sankt Hubert
Stiring-Wendel	Stieringen-Wendel
Saint-Jean-de-Bassel	Sankt Johann vom Bassel
Saint-Jean-Rohrbach	Johanns-Rohrbach
Saint-Joseph	Sankt Joseph
Saint-Léon	Sankt Leon
Saint-Louis	Sankt Louis
Saint-Louis-lès-Bitche	Münzthal-St. Louis
Saint-Nabor	Sankt Nabor
Saint-Nicolas-en-Forêt	Sankt Nikolaus im Wald
Saint-Oswald	Sankt Oswald
Stuckange	Stückingen
Sturzelbronn	Stürzelbronn
Suisse	Schweiz
Talange	Talingen
Tarquimpol	Tarquinpol
Tensch	Tensch
Tenteling	Tentelingen
Terville	Terwen
Téterchen	Teterchen
Teting-sur-Nied	Tetingen a.d. Nied
Thalhauseln	Thalhäuseln
Théding	Thedingen
Thicourt	Diedendorf
Thimonville	Thimmenheim
Thionville	Diedenhofen
Torcheville	Dorsweiler
Tressange	Tressingen
Troisfontaines	Dreibrunnen
Trois-Maisons	Dreihäuser
Tromborn	Tromborn
Tullier	???
Tunting	Tüntingen
Turquestein	Türkstein
Uberkinger	Überkinger
Uckange	Ückingen
Untermuhlthal	Untermühlthal
Urbach	Urbach a.d. Breusch
Usselskirch	Usselskirch
Vahl-Ebersing	Vahl-Ebersing
Vahl-lès-Bénestroff	Vahl b. Bensdorf
Vahl-lès-Faulquemont	Vahl b. Falkenberg
Val-de-Bride	Genesdorf
Valette	Valette
Vallerange	Walleringen
Vallerysthal	Vallerysthal
Valmestroff	Walmesdorf
Valmunster	Valmünster
Vannecourt	Warnhofen
Vantoux	Wanten
Varize	Waibelskirchen
Varsberg	Varsberg
Vasperviller	Wasperweiler
Vatimont	Wallersberg
Vaudoncourt	Wieblingen
Vaudreching	Wallerchen
Veckersviller	Weckersweiler
Veckring	Weckringen
Velving	Welwingen
Venheck	Venheck
Wentzviller	Wenzweiler
Vescheim	Weschheim
Veymerange	Weimertingen
Vibersviller	Wiebersweiler
Vieux-Lixheim	Alt Lixheim
Viller	Weiler
Villers-Bettnach	Weiler-Bettnach
Villing	Willingen
Vilsberg	Wilsberg
Vintrange	Wintringen
Virming	Wirmingen
Vittersbourg	Wittersburg
Vittoncourt	Wittenhofen
Viviers	Weiher
Voelfling-lès-Bouzonville	Wölflingen b. Busendorf
Voimhaut	Wainwalz (1915-1918); Weintal (1940-1944)
Volkrange	Volkringen
Volmerange-lès-Boulay	Wolmeringen
Volmerange-les-Mines	Wollmeringen
Volmunster	Wolmünster
Volstroff	Wolsdorf
Voyer	Weiher
Vrémy	Fremich (1915-1918); Fremmingen (1940-1944)
Vry	Verich (1915-1918); Werich (1940-1944)
Waldhouse	Waldhausen
Walscheid	Walscheid
Waldweistroff	Waldweisdorf
Waldwisse	Waldwiese
Walschbronn	Walschbronn
Waltembourg	Waltenburg
Weidesheim	Weidesheim
Weiherkirch	Weiherkirch
Welferding	Wölferdingen
Wiesviller	Wiesweiler
Willerwald	Willerwald
Wintersbourg	Wintersburg
Wittring	Wittringen
Woelfling-lès-Sarreguemines	Wölflingen b. Saargemünd
Woustviller	Wustweiler
Xouaxange	Schweixingen
Yutz	Jeutz
Zarbeling	Zarbeling
Zellen	Zellen
Zetting	Zettingen
Zeurange	Seringen
Zilling	Zillingen
Zimming	Zimmingen
Zinzing	Zinzingen
Zommange	Zommingen
Zondrange	Zondringen
Zoufftgen	Suftgen

== Toponyms from the reorganization of territory ==
The reorganization of territory is a common occurrence throughout history, thus an important consideration in toponymy. Counties and cantons can be broken apart. New communes can be formed by joining several localities together. And sometimes through these changes a given name can migrate to a different locality that where it was originally used. Records of such territorial changes are increasingly scarce with the centuries, thus territorial histories tend to obscure with time. Few attestations are available for the founding or change of territory through the late first millennium, but records gradually improve, and by the late second millennium, scholars like Cassini, Lepage, and Boutilleir have largely collated all the toponyms attested in charts concerning the history of Austrasia into dictionaries and other tombs of reference.

Consider Condé-Northen in Moselle, which began as the ancient commune, Condé (specifically Condium or Condicum), attested as existing in 787. In 1804, a neighboring commune, Northen, was attached to Condé and the new territory became known by the name it bears today. But the growth did not stop there. In 1810, Pontigny was attached, and finally Loutremange was attached in 1979 by order of a prefectoral decree (arrêté préfectoral). While Northen, Pontigny, and Loutremange are no longer communes, thus no longer considered territorial collectivities, they are still recognized as localities within Condé-Northen.

Today communes increasingly join around large cities, where suburban communes grow into each other. For this to be possible, the communes must be adjacent and within the same department. Officials from both communes must jointly request the merger. The new municipality is typically named by hyphenating the two former toponyms together (seemingly in alphabetical order). Examples include Ancy-Dornot (formerly the communes of Ancy and Dornot) and Freyming-Merlebach (formerly Freyming and Merlebach), both in Moselle. Others certainly exist, and more likely will in the future. Municipalities of this kind are formed in the historical region of Alsace as well.

Yet another situation, though more rural and rare, is a large commune originally formed around multiple hamlets, farms, or other lesser localities that are nevertheless on the map. An example here concerns Métairies-Saint-Quirin, a relatively new commune formed around 1790 when the jurisdiction of the priory of Saint-Quirin was partially changed, possibly in relation to the National Convention. The distributed commune's domain originally encompassed eleven large farms, called censes: Craon (then Créon), Cubolot, Fontaine aux Chênes, Halmoze, Heille (or Helde), L'hor, Le Jardinot (became Haute-Gueisse during the Revolution), Jean Limon, La Petite Maladrerie, Rond-Pré, and Viller (or Courtegain). Of the original eleven properties making up the commune, only six still remain: Cubolot, Halmoze, Heille, Haute-Gueisse, Jean Limon, and Rond-Pré. The town hall of Métairies-Saint-Quirin has been located in Cubolot since 1920.

== See also ==
- German exonyms
- List of European exonyms
