= Bannay =

Bannay may refer to the following places in France:

- Bannay, Cher, a commune in the department of Cher
- Bannay, Marne, a commune in the department of Marne
- Bannay, Moselle, a commune in the department of Moselle
