= Loux =

Loux is a surname. Notable people with the surname include:

- Barret Loux (born 1989), American baseball player
- John Loux (1818–1886), Canadian politician
- Michael J. Loux (born 1942), American philosopher
- Ryan Le Loux (born 1984), Australian cricketer
- Shane Loux (born 1979), American baseball player

== See also ==
- Loux (company)
