= Oudrenne =

- Commune
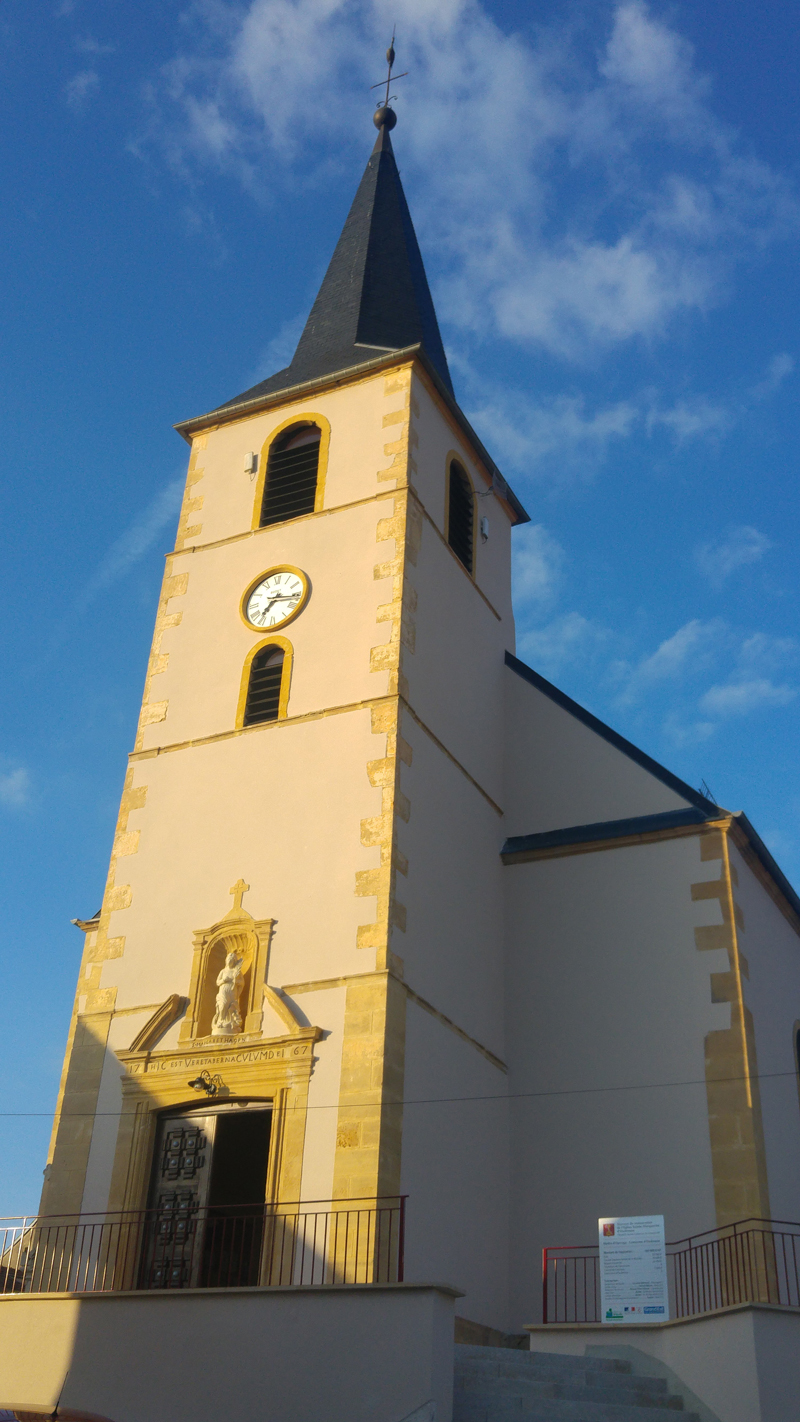
- The church in Oudrenne

- Coat of arms
- Location of Oudrenne
- Location within France Location within Grand Est
- Coordinates: 49°22′52″N 6°19′42″E
- Country: France
- Region: Grand Est
- Department: Moselle
- Arrondissement: Thionville
- Canton: Metzervisse
- Intercommunality: CC de l'Arc Mosellan

Government
  - Mayor (2020–2026): Bernard Guirkinger
- Area^{1}: 20.38 km^{2} (7.87 sq mi)
- Highest elevation: 310 m (1,020 ft)
- Lowest elevation: 167 m (548 ft)
- Population (2023): 724
  - Density: 35.5/km^{2} (92.0/sq mi)
- Time zone: UTC+01:00 (CET)
  - Summer (DST): UTC+02:00 (CEST)
- INSEE/Postal code: 57531 /57970
- ^{1} French Land Register data, which excludes lakes, ponds, glaciers > 1 km^{2} (0.386 sq mi or 247 acres) and river estuaries.

Oudrenne (French pronunciation: [udʁɛn]; German: Udern) is a commune in the Moselle department in Grand Est in north-eastern France.

== See also ==
- Communes of the Moselle department
