= Bibiche =

- Commune
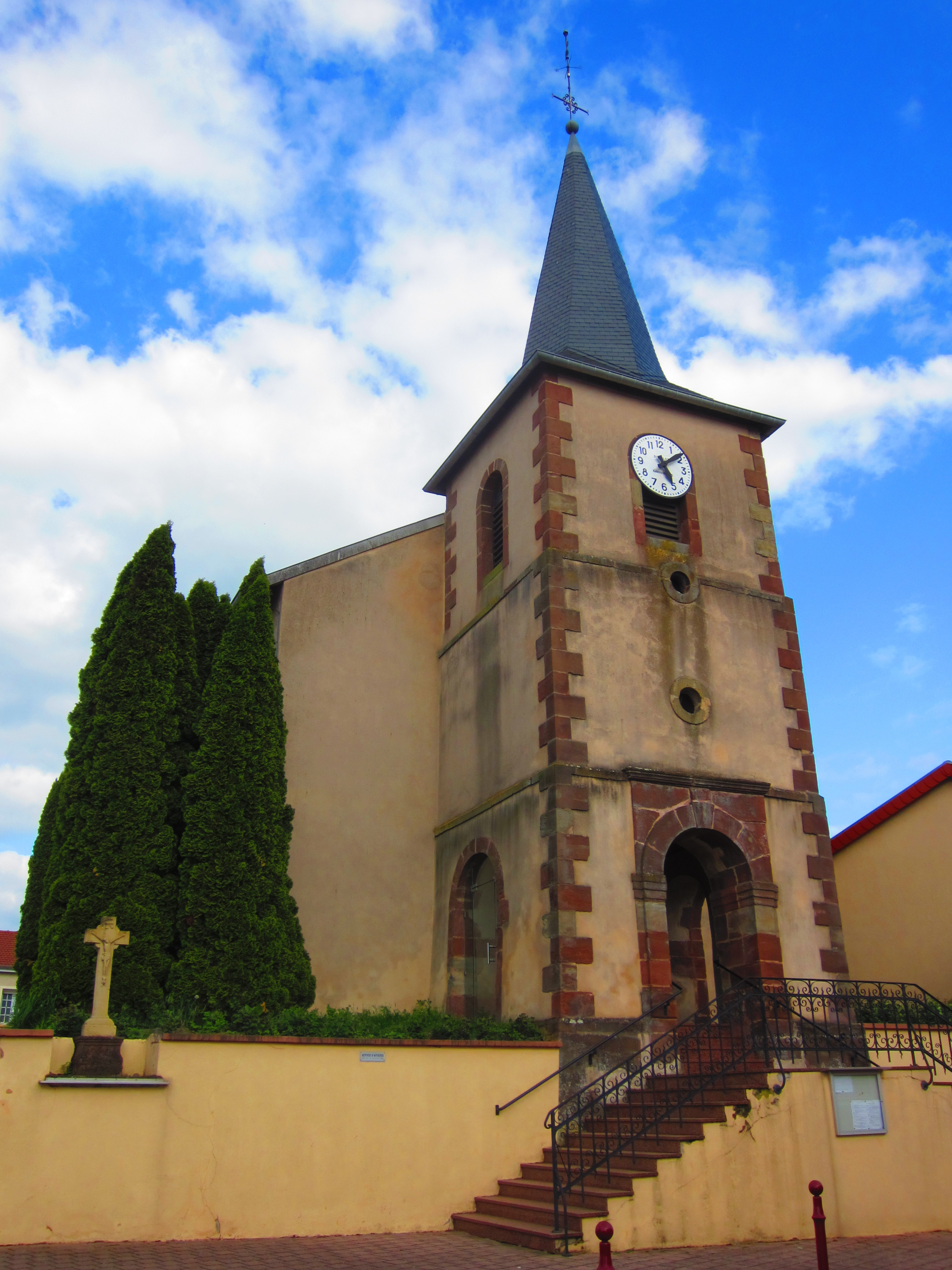
- The church in Bibiche

- Coat of arms
- Location of Bibiche
- Location within France Location within Grand Est
- Coordinates: 49°19′46″N 6°28′40″E
- Country: France
- Region: Grand Est
- Department: Moselle
- Arrondissement: Forbach-Boulay-Moselle
- Canton: Bouzonville
- Intercommunality: Bouzonvillois-Trois Frontières

Government
  - Mayor (2020–2026): Jean-Paul Weistroffer
- Area^{1}: 12.52 km^{2} (4.83 sq mi)
- Elevation: 310 m (1,020 ft)
- Highest elevation: 295 m (968 ft)
- Lowest elevation: 207 m (679 ft)
- Population (2023): 425
  - Density: 33.9/km^{2} (87.9/sq mi)
- Time zone: UTC+01:00 (CET)
  - Summer (DST): UTC+02:00 (CEST)
- INSEE/Postal code: 57079 /57320
- ^{1} French Land Register data, which excludes lakes, ponds, glaciers > 1 km^{2} (0.386 sq mi or 247 acres) and river estuaries.

Bibiche (French pronunciation: [bibiʃ]; German: Bibisch) is a commune in the Moselle department in Grand Est in northeastern France. Formerly known as Bibersheim, the original village was entirely destroyed during the Thirty Years' War. The localities of Neudorff (German: Neudorf) and Rodlach (German: also Rodlach) are incorporated in the commune since 1810.

Bibiche is also a French language term of endearment based on the term 'biche' (doe).

== Population ==
Historical population
Year	Pop.	±% p.a.
1968	331	—
1975	362	+1.29%
1982	353	−0.36%
1990	344	−0.32%
1999	356	+0.38%
2007	428	+2.33%
2012	444	+0.74%
2017	452	+0.36%
2023	425	−1.02%
Source: INSEE

== See also ==
- Communes of the Moselle department
