= Cense =

Type of farm

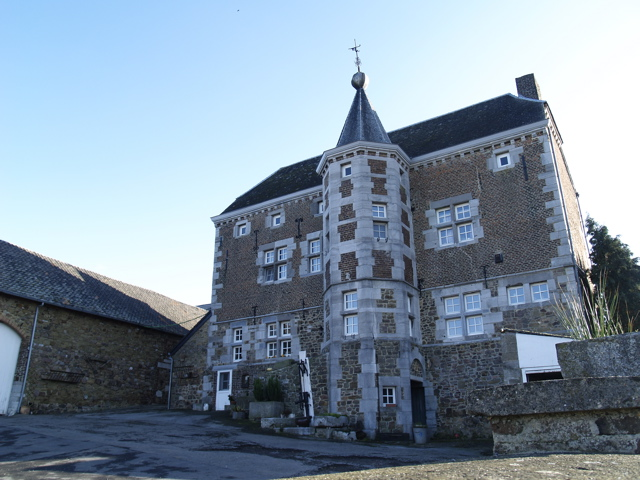
The Cense de Solières in Liège, Belgium.

A cense (likely originating from the Walloon and Picard cinse, meaning "farm") is a Meierhof or type of farm found in certain regions of France and Francophone Belgium.

The word derives from the Late Latin censa, which refers to a type of rural lease present since Late Antiquity, and would later become the name for a farm itself. A censier himself was thus a tenant farmer lacking many real possessions.

The Censes (abbreviated Cse) of Belgium are recorded with their respective names in the Ferraris Map, a historical map of the 1770s Austrian Netherlands.
