= Ébersviller =

- Commune
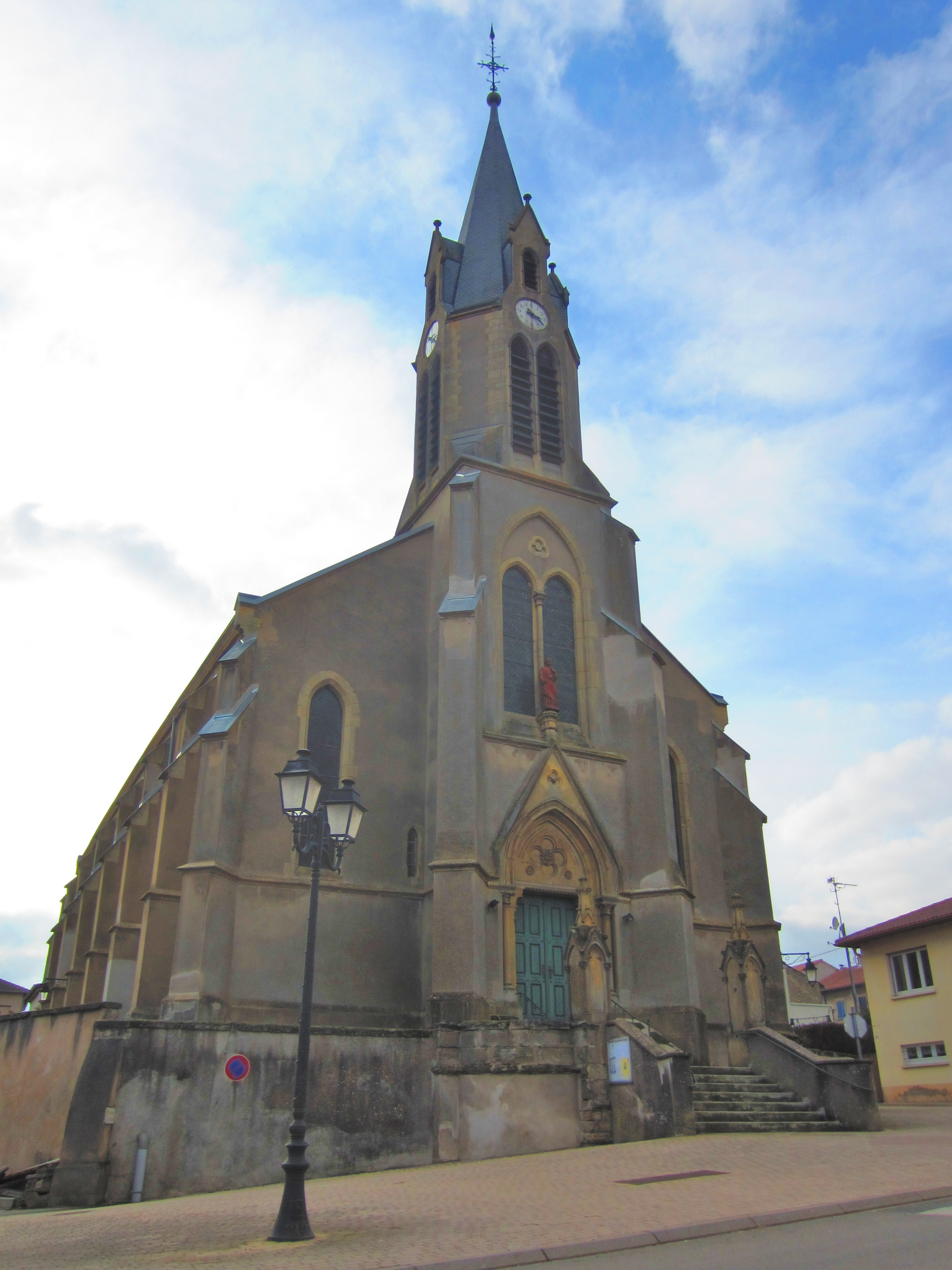
- The church in Ébersviller

- Coat of arms
- Location of Ébersviller
- Location within France Location within Grand Est
- Coordinates: 49°16′39″N 6°24′12″E
- Country: France
- Region: Grand Est
- Department: Moselle
- Arrondissement: Forbach-Boulay-Moselle
- Canton: Bouzonville
- Intercommunality: Bouzonvillois-Trois Frontières

Government
  - Mayor (2020–2026): Edmond Moritz
- Area^{1}: 14.07 km^{2} (5.43 sq mi)
- Elevation: 235 m (771 ft)
- Highest elevation: 351 m (1,152 ft)
- Lowest elevation: 210 m (690 ft)
- Population (2023): 963
  - Density: 68.4/km^{2} (177/sq mi)
- Time zone: UTC+01:00 (CET)
  - Summer (DST): UTC+02:00 (CEST)
- INSEE/Postal code: 57186 /57320
- ^{1} French Land Register data, which excludes lakes, ponds, glaciers > 1 km^{2} (0.386 sq mi or 247 acres) and river estuaries.

Ébersviller (Lorraine Franconian Ebeschwiller/Ewëschweller, German: Ebersweiler) is a commune in the Moselle department in Grand Est in north-eastern France.

Localities of the commune: Ising (German: Isingen), Férange, Kreschmuhle (German: Kreschmühle), Labrück.

== Population ==
Historical population
Year	Pop.	±% p.a.
1968	499	—
1975	472	−0.79%
1982	502	+0.88%
1990	588	+2.00%
1999	660	+1.29%
2007	804	+2.50%
2012	886	+1.96%
2017	949	+1.38%
2023	963	+0.24%
Source: INSEE

== See also ==
- Communes of the Moselle department
