= Laumesfeld =

Laumesfeld Laumëschfeld
- Commune
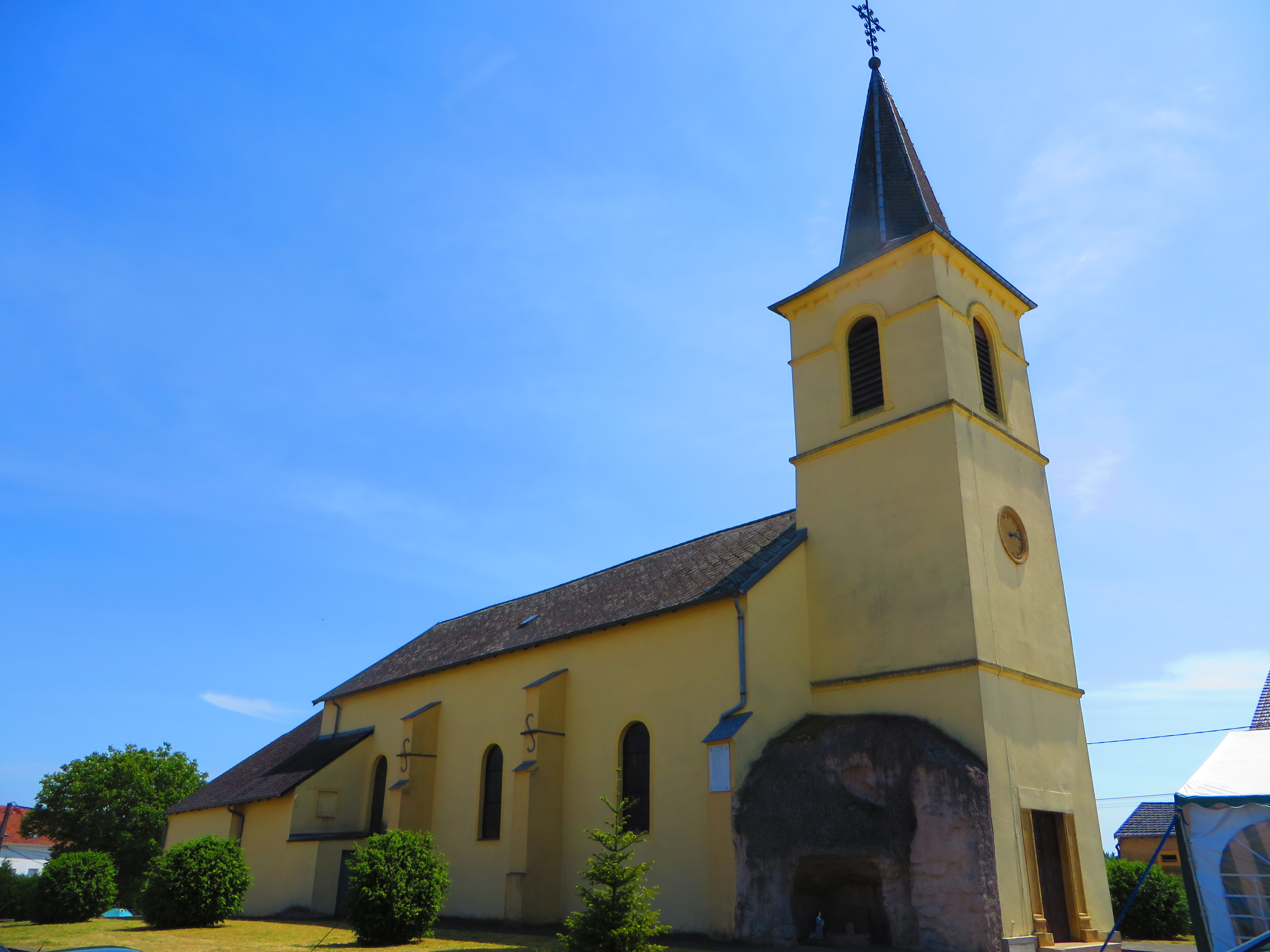
- The church in Laumesfeld

- Coat of arms
- Location of Laumesfeld
- Location within France Location within Grand Est
- Coordinates: 49°22′11″N 6°26′41″E
- Country: France
- Region: Grand Est
- Department: Moselle
- Arrondissement: Thionville
- Canton: Bouzonville
- Intercommunality: Bouzonvillois-Trois Frontières

Government
  - Mayor (2020–2026): Gilbert Tritz
- Area^{1}: 8.3 km^{2} (3.2 sq mi)
- Elevation: 215 m (705 ft)
- Highest elevation: 306 m (1,004 ft)
- Lowest elevation: 234 m (768 ft)
- Population (2023): 278
  - Density: 33/km^{2} (87/sq mi)
- Time zone: UTC+01:00 (CET)
  - Summer (DST): UTC+02:00 (CEST)
- INSEE/Postal code: 57387 /57480
- ^{1} French Land Register data, which excludes lakes, ponds, glaciers > 1 km^{2} (0.386 sq mi or 247 acres) and river estuaries.

Laumesfeld is a commune in the Moselle department in Grand Est in north-eastern France.

== See also ==
- Communes of the Moselle department
