= Rodalbe =

- Commune
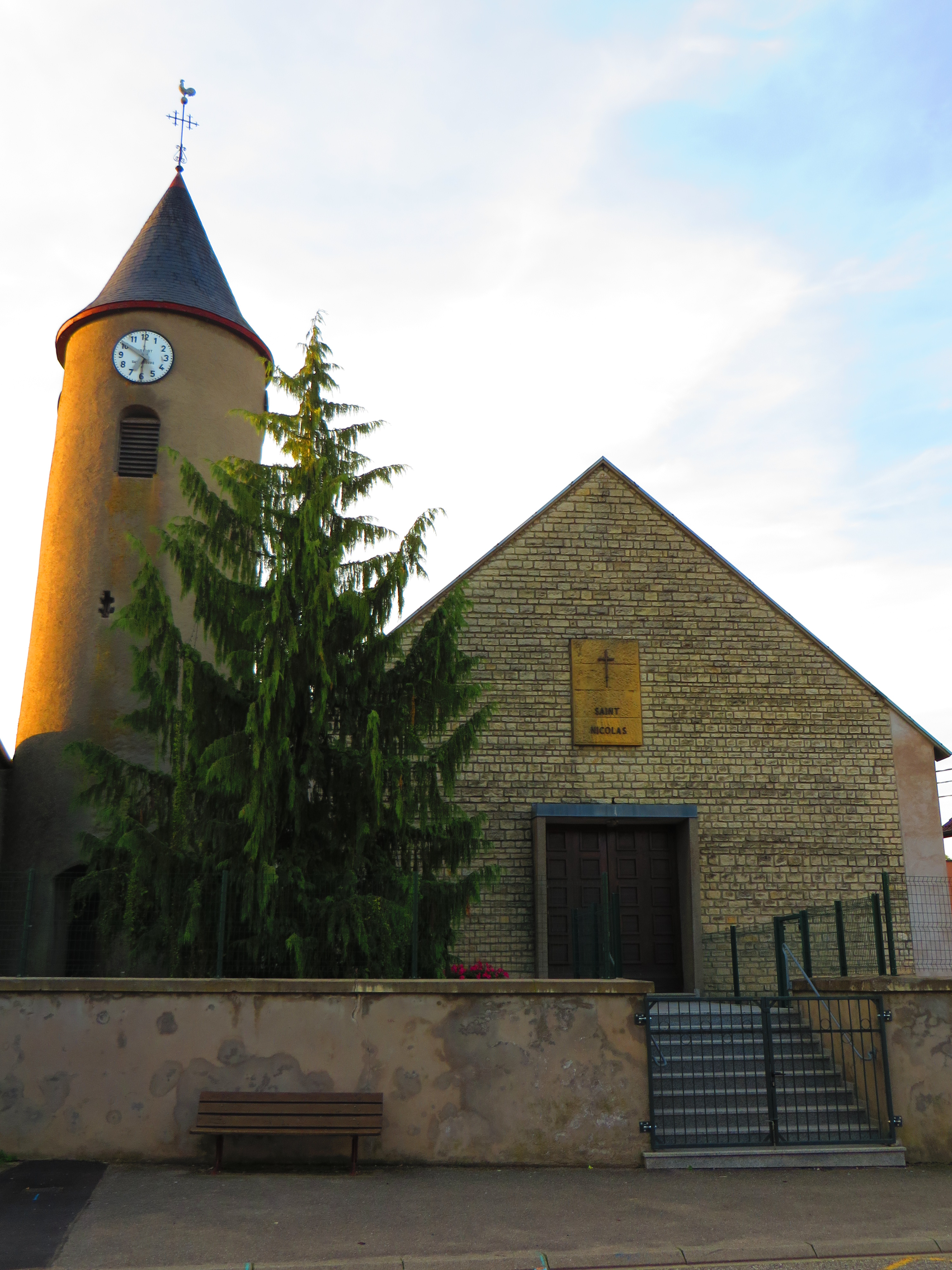
- The church in Rodalbe

- Coat of arms
- Location of Rodalbe
- Location within France Location within Grand Est
- Coordinates: 48°54′33″N 6°42′12″E
- Country: France
- Region: Grand Est
- Department: Moselle
- Arrondissement: Sarrebourg-Château-Salins
- Canton: Le Saulnois
- Intercommunality: CC du Saulnois

Government
  - Mayor (2020–2026): Roland Discher
- Area^{1}: 10.57 km^{2} (4.08 sq mi)
- Elevation: 245 m (804 ft)
- Highest elevation: 290 m (950 ft)
- Lowest elevation: 226 m (741 ft)
- Population (2023): 246
  - Density: 23.3/km^{2} (60.3/sq mi)
- Time zone: UTC+01:00 (CET)
  - Summer (DST): UTC+02:00 (CEST)
- INSEE/Postal code: 57587 /57340
- ^{1} French Land Register data, which excludes lakes, ponds, glaciers > 1 km^{2} (0.386 sq mi or 247 acres) and river estuaries.

Rodalbe (French pronunciation: [ʁɔdalb]; 1801 and German: Rodalben) is a commune in the Moselle department in Grand Est in north-eastern France.

== Climate ==
On average, Rodalbe experiences 68.3 days per year with a minimum temperature below 0 °C (32.0 °F), 2.2 days per year with a minimum temperature below −10 °C (14.0 °F), 10.9 days per year with a maximum temperature below 0 °C (32.0 °F), and 14.8 days per year with a maximum temperature above 30 °C (86.0 °F). The record high temperature was 38.7 °C (101.7 °F) on July 24, 2019, while the record low temperature was −18.1 °C (−0.6 °F) on December 26, 2010.

Climate data for Rodalbe (1991–2020 normals, extremes 2005–present)
Month	Jan	Feb	Mar	Apr	May	Jun	Jul	Aug	Sep	Oct	Nov	Dec	Year
Record high °C (°F)	15.0 (59.0)	20.8 (69.4)	25.1 (77.2)	27.5 (81.5)	32.5 (90.5)	36.7 (98.1)	38.7 (101.7)	37.8 (100.0)	33.2 (91.8)	27.7 (81.9)	21.3 (70.3)	16.4 (61.5)	38.7 (101.7)
Mean daily maximum °C (°F)	4.7 (40.5)	6.3 (43.3)	10.7 (51.3)	16.2 (61.2)	19.4 (66.9)	23.6 (74.5)	26.1 (79.0)	24.7 (76.5)	20.9 (69.6)	15.3 (59.5)	9.1 (48.4)	5.6 (42.1)	15.2 (59.4)
Daily mean °C (°F)	2.1 (35.8)	3.0 (37.4)	6.1 (43.0)	10.3 (50.5)	13.7 (56.7)	17.5 (63.5)	19.7 (67.5)	18.8 (65.8)	15.3 (59.5)	11.1 (52.0)	6.3 (43.3)	3.1 (37.6)	10.6 (51.1)
Mean daily minimum °C (°F)	−0.4 (31.3)	−0.2 (31.6)	1.5 (34.7)	4.4 (39.9)	8.0 (46.4)	11.4 (52.5)	13.4 (56.1)	13.0 (55.4)	9.7 (49.5)	6.9 (44.4)	3.4 (38.1)	0.7 (33.3)	6.0 (42.8)
Record low °C (°F)	−13.8 (7.2)	−16.1 (3.0)	−9.0 (15.8)	−5.5 (22.1)	−1.4 (29.5)	2.1 (35.8)	4.8 (40.6)	4.0 (39.2)	0.3 (32.5)	−6.5 (20.3)	−8.1 (17.4)	−18.1 (−0.6)	−18.1 (−0.6)
Average precipitation mm (inches)	56.7 (2.23)	59.5 (2.34)	54.7 (2.15)	40.4 (1.59)	67.2 (2.65)	62.6 (2.46)	58.4 (2.30)	72.8 (2.87)	60.2 (2.37)	60.4 (2.38)	66.7 (2.63)	77.6 (3.06)	737.2 (29.03)
Average precipitation days (≥ 1.0 mm)	12.1	10.8	10.1	7.8	10.8	9.4	9.8	10.3	7.8	9.5	11.1	13.4	122.9
Source: Meteociel

== See also ==
- Communes of the Moselle department
