= Guerstling =

- Commune
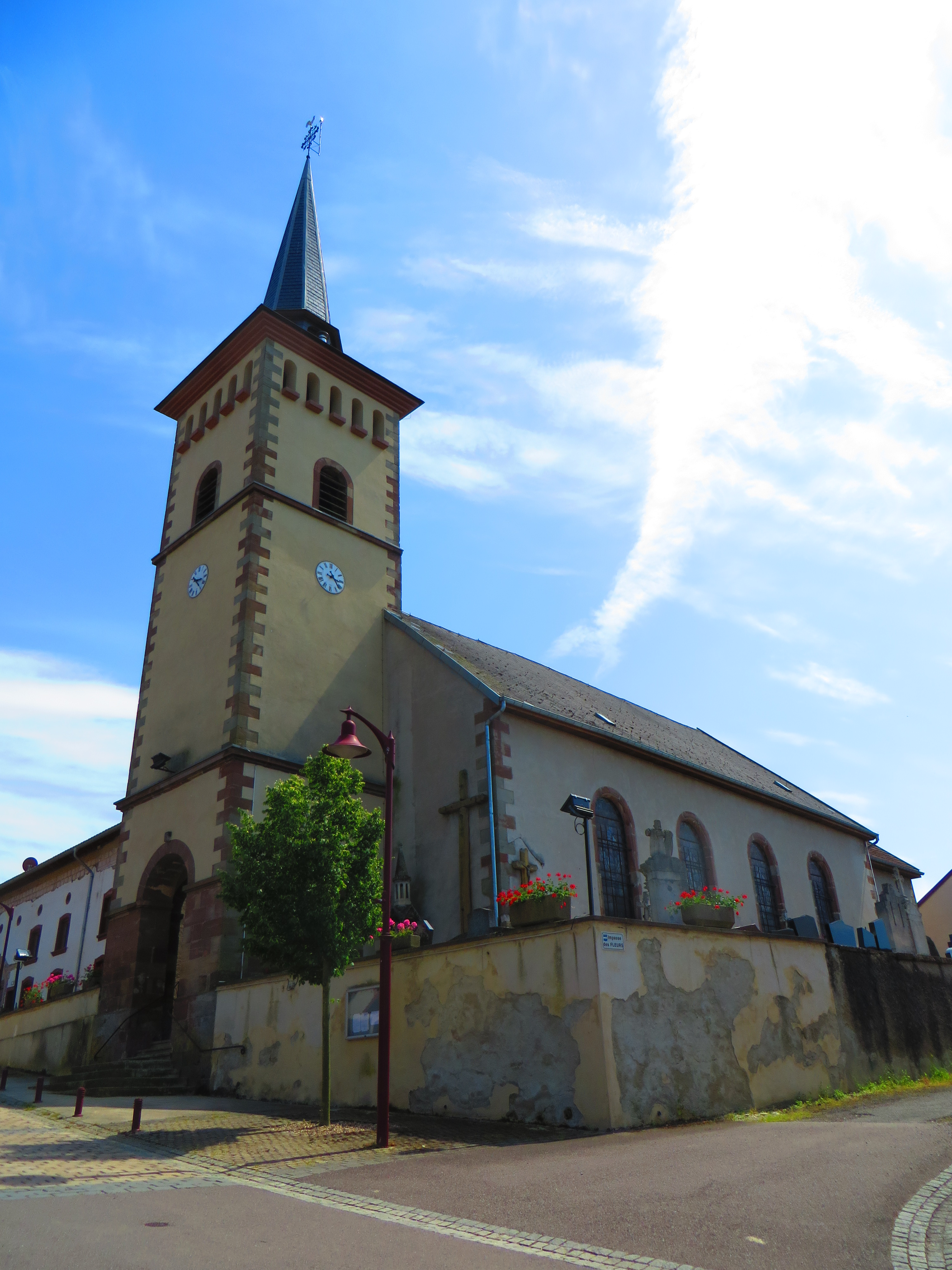
- The church in Guerstling

- Coat of arms
- Location of Guerstling
- Location within France Location within Grand Est
- Coordinates: 49°19′43″N 6°34′49″E
- Country: France
- Region: Grand Est
- Department: Moselle
- Arrondissement: Forbach-Boulay-Moselle
- Canton: Bouzonville
- Intercommunality: Bouzonvillois - Trois Frontières

Government
  - Mayor (2020–2026): Jean-Luc Dauendorfer
- Area^{1}: 4.42 km^{2} (1.71 sq mi)
- Elevation: 210 m (690 ft)
- Highest elevation: 323 m (1,060 ft)
- Lowest elevation: 185 m (607 ft)
- Population (2023): 360
  - Density: 81/km^{2} (210/sq mi)
- Time zone: UTC+01:00 (CET)
  - Summer (DST): UTC+02:00 (CEST)
- INSEE/Postal code: 57273 /57320
- ^{1} French Land Register data, which excludes lakes, ponds, glaciers > 1 km^{2} (0.386 sq mi or 247 acres) and river estuaries.

Guerstling (French pronunciation: [ɡɛʁstlɛ̃]; German: Gerstlingen) is a commune in the Moselle department in Grand Est in north-eastern France.

== See also ==
- Communes of the Moselle department
