= Berviller-en-Moselle =

- Commune
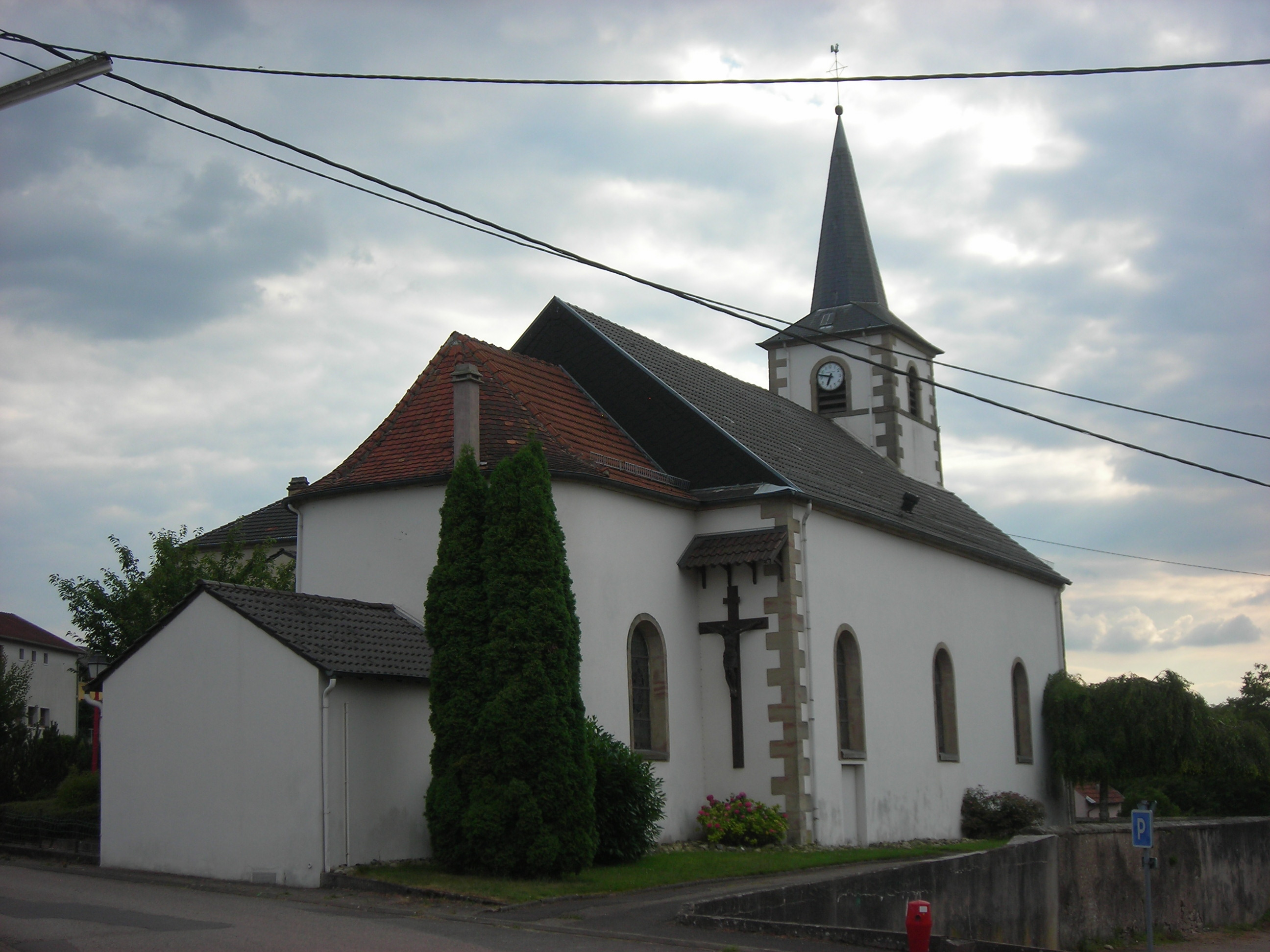
- Saint Fiacre

- Coat of arms
- Location of Berviller-en-Moselle
- Location within France Location within Grand Est
- Coordinates: 49°16′20″N 6°38′55″E
- Country: France
- Region: Grand Est
- Department: Moselle
- Arrondissement: Forbach-Boulay-Moselle
- Canton: Bouzonville

Government
  - Mayor (2022–2026): Laurine Gillot
- Area^{1}: 5.52 km^{2} (2.13 sq mi)
- Elevation: 210 m (690 ft)
- Highest elevation: 362 m (1,188 ft)
- Lowest elevation: 207 m (679 ft)
- Population (2023): 464
  - Density: 84.1/km^{2} (218/sq mi)
- Time zone: UTC+01:00 (CET)
  - Summer (DST): UTC+02:00 (CEST)
- INSEE/Postal code: 57069 /57550
- ^{1} French Land Register data, which excludes lakes, ponds, glaciers > 1 km^{2} (0.386 sq mi or 247 acres) and river estuaries.

Berviller-en-Moselle (German: Berweiler) is a commune in the Moselle department in Grand Est in northeastern France.

== Population ==
Historical population
Year	Pop.	±% p.a.
1968	370	—
1975	387	+0.64%
1982	454	+2.31%
1990	479	+0.67%
1999	447	−0.77%
2007	481	+0.92%
2012	491	+0.41%
2017	471	−0.83%
2023	464	−0.25%
Source: INSEE

== See also ==
- Communes of the Moselle department
