= Flétrange =

- Commune
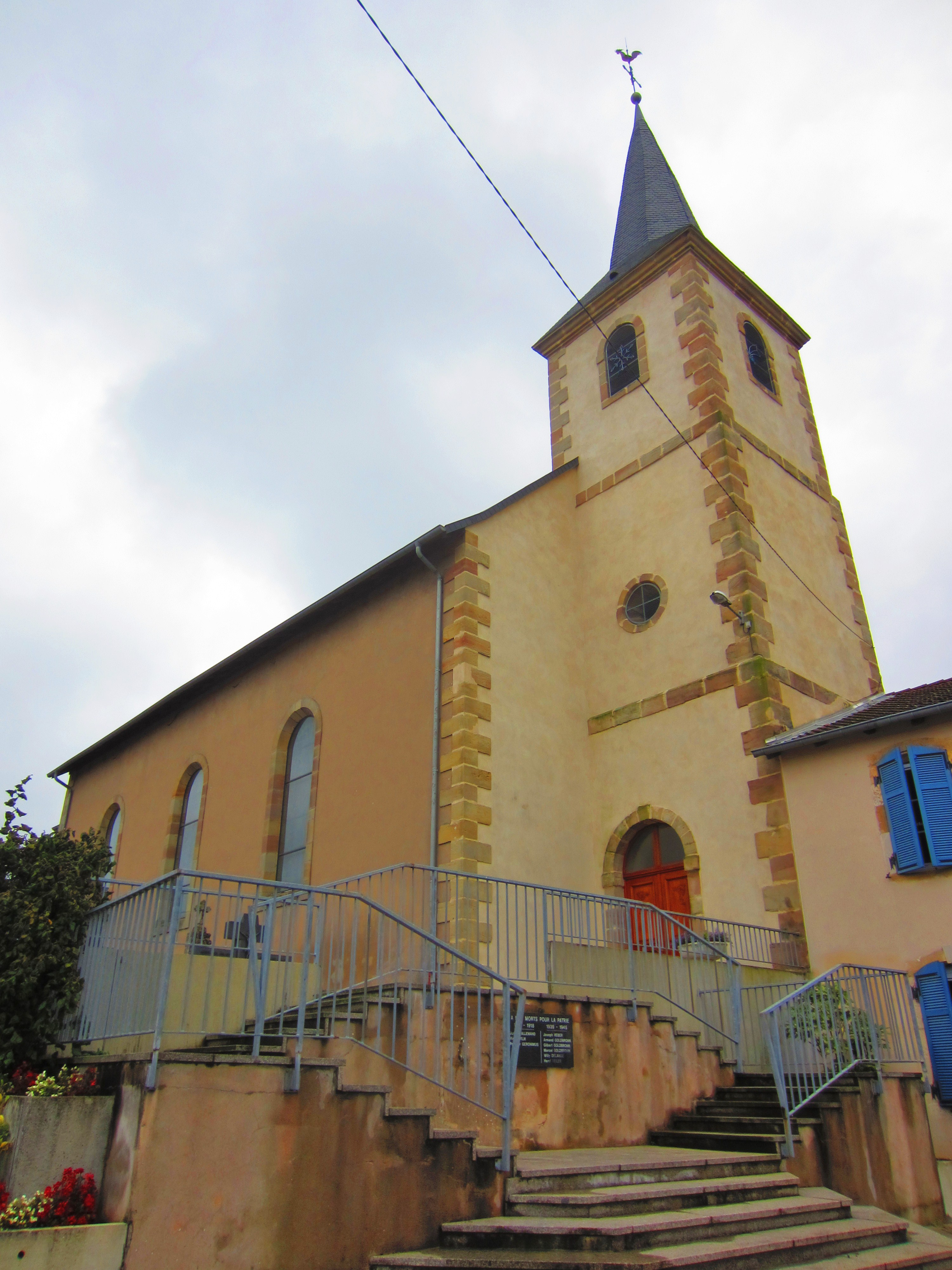
- The church in Flétrange

- Coat of arms
- Location of Flétrange
- Location within France Location within Grand Est
- Coordinates: 49°03′47″N 6°33′37″E
- Country: France
- Region: Grand Est
- Department: Moselle
- Arrondissement: Forbach-Boulay-Moselle
- Canton: Faulquemont
- Intercommunality: CC du District Urbain de Faulquemont

Government
  - Mayor (2020–2026): André Bayer
- Area^{1}: 6.07 km^{2} (2.34 sq mi)
- Elevation: 300 m (980 ft)
- Highest elevation: 377 m (1,237 ft)
- Lowest elevation: 232 m (761 ft)
- Population (2023): 875
  - Density: 144/km^{2} (373/sq mi)
- Time zone: UTC+01:00 (CET)
  - Summer (DST): UTC+02:00 (CEST)
- INSEE/Postal code: 57217 /57690
- ^{1} French Land Register data, which excludes lakes, ponds, glaciers > 1 km^{2} (0.386 sq mi or 247 acres) and river estuaries.

Flétrange (French pronunciation: [fletʁɑ̃ʒ]; German: Fletringen) is a commune in the Moselle department in Grand Est in north-eastern France.

Localities of the commune: Dorviller (German: Dorweiler)

== See also ==
- Communes of the Moselle department
