= Diding =

Didding दिदिङ
- Village development committee
- Location in Nepal
- Coordinates: 27.48°N 87.21°E
- Country: Nepal
- Zone: Kosi Zone
- District: Sankhuwasabha District

Population (1991)
  - Total: 2,900
- Time zone: UTC+5:45 (Nepal Time)

Diding is a village development committee in Sankhuwasabha District in the Kosi Zone of north-eastern Nepal.Recently this local place is known for so far the biggest hydroelectric project of nepal, arun iii. According to the new structure of country nepal It fall under the province no.2.At the time of the 1991 Nepal census it had a population of 2900 people living in 566 individual households.
