= Michael J. Loux =

American philosopher and George N (born 1942)

- Born: August 17, 1942 (age 84)

Philosophical work
- Era: 21st-century philosophy
- Region: Western philosophy
- Institutions: University of Notre Dame
- Main interests: Metaphysics

Michael J. Loux (born August 17, 1942) is an American philosopher and George N. Shuster Professor of Philosophy Emeritus at the University of Notre Dame. He is known for his works on metaphysics.

== Books ==
- Metaphysics: A Contemporary Introduction, 4th. ed. (co-author) (2017)
- Metaphysics: A Contemporary Introduction, 3rd. ed. (2006)
- Nature, Norm, and Psyche: Explorations in Aristotelian Psychology (2004)
- Oxford Handbook of Metaphysics (co-editor) (2003)
- Metaphysics: Contemporary Readings (2001)
- Primary Ousia: An Essay on Aristotle's Metaphysics Z and H (1991)
- The Possible and the Actual (1980)
- The Synoptic Vision (co-author) (1977)
- Substance and Attribute (1978)
- Ockham's Theory of Terms: Part I of the Summa Logica (1974)
- Universals and Particulars (1970)
