= Kappelkinger =

- Commune
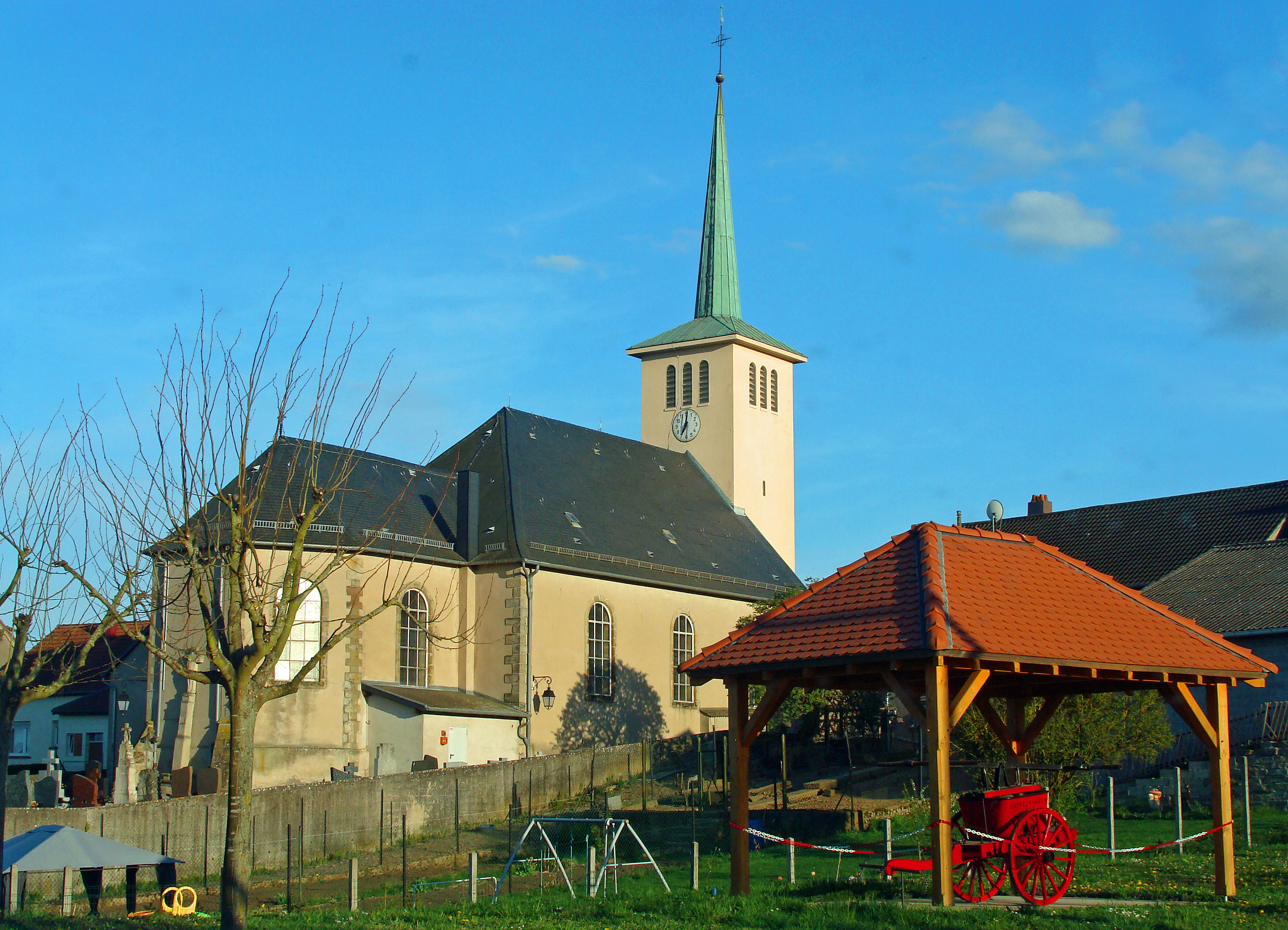
- The church in Kappelkinger

- Coat of arms
- Location of Kappelkinger
- Location within France Location within Grand Est
- Coordinates: 48°58′19″N 6°54′36″E
- Country: France
- Region: Grand Est
- Department: Moselle
- Arrondissement: Sarreguemines
- Canton: Sarralbe
- Intercommunality: CA Sarreguemines Confluences

Government
  - Mayor (2020–2026): Bertrand Potié
- Area^{1}: 8.58 km^{2} (3.31 sq mi)
- Elevation: 260 m (850 ft)
- Highest elevation: 247 m (810 ft)
- Lowest elevation: 213 m (699 ft)
- Population (2023): 425
  - Density: 49.5/km^{2} (128/sq mi)
- Time zone: UTC+01:00 (CET)
  - Summer (DST): UTC+02:00 (CEST)
- INSEE/Postal code: 57357 /57430
- ^{1} French Land Register data, which excludes lakes, ponds, glaciers > 1 km^{2} (0.386 sq mi or 247 acres) and river estuaries.

Kappelkinger (French pronunciation: [kapəlkɛ̃ʒe]) is a commune in the Moselle department in Grand Est in north-eastern France.
Localities of the commune: Uberkinger, Kohlplatz.

== Population ==
Historical population
Year	Pop.	±% p.a.
1968	442	—
1975	390	−1.77%
1982	403	+0.47%
1990	388	−0.47%
1999	401	+0.37%
2007	397	−0.13%
2012	410	+0.65%
2017	398	−0.59%
2023	425	+1.10%
Source: INSEE

== See also ==
- Communes of the Moselle department
