= Ernestviller =

- Commune
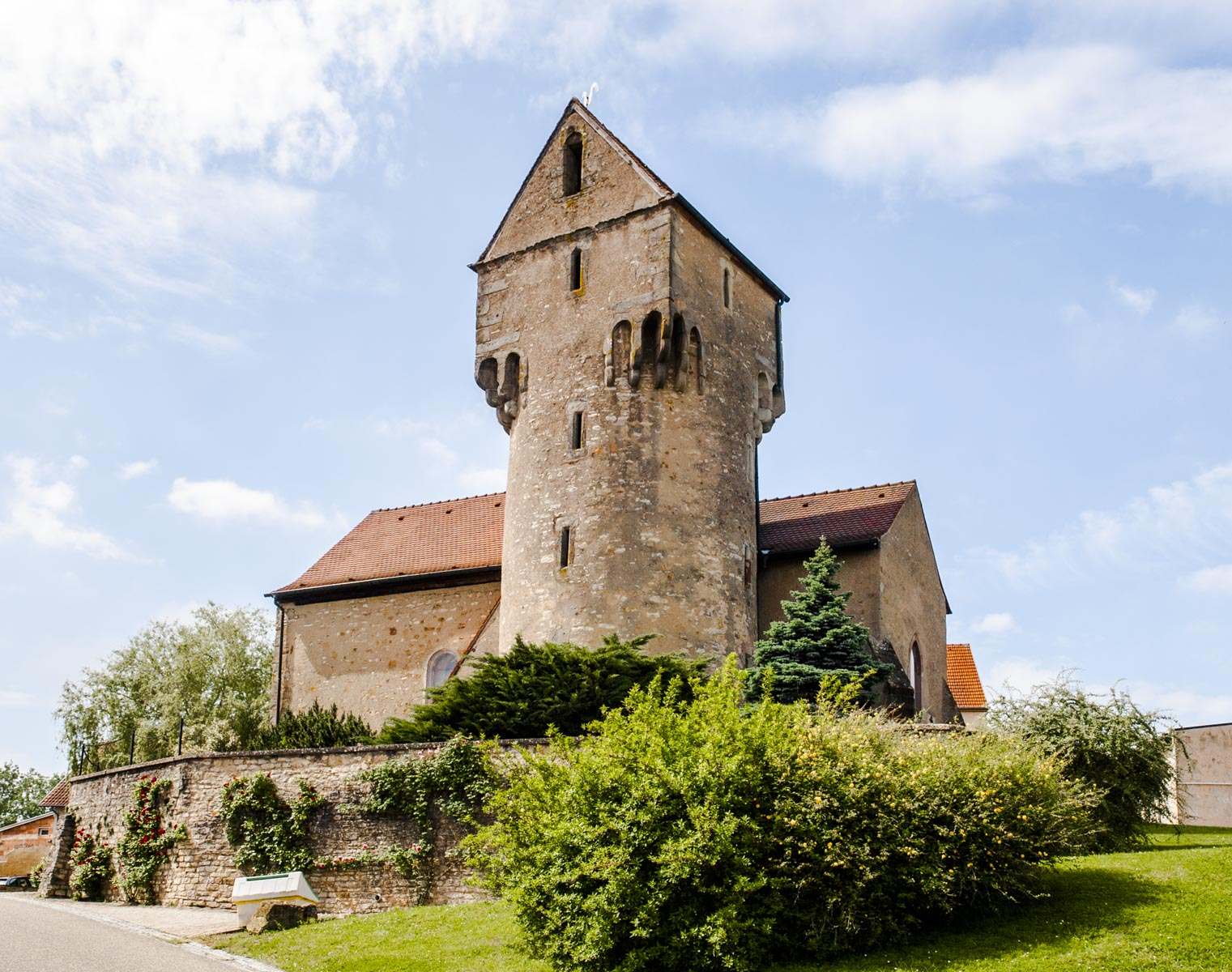
- The church in Heckenransbach

- Coat of arms
- Location of Ernestviller
- Location within France Location within Grand Est
- Coordinates: 49°04′05″N 6°57′54″E
- Country: France
- Region: Grand Est
- Department: Moselle
- Arrondissement: Sarreguemines
- Canton: Sarralbe
- Intercommunality: CA Sarreguemines Confluences

Government
  - Mayor (2020–2026): Roger Heim
- Area^{1}: 4.44 km^{2} (1.71 sq mi)
- Elevation: 240 m (790 ft)
- Highest elevation: 276 m (906 ft)
- Lowest elevation: 225 m (738 ft)
- Population (2023): 503
  - Density: 113/km^{2} (293/sq mi)
- Time zone: UTC+01:00 (CET)
  - Summer (DST): UTC+02:00 (CEST)
- INSEE/Postal code: 57197 /57510
- ^{1} French Land Register data, which excludes lakes, ponds, glaciers > 1 km^{2} (0.386 sq mi or 247 acres) and river estuaries.

Ernestviller (French pronunciation: [ɛʁnɛstvilɛʁ]; German: Ernstweiler) is a commune in the Moselle department in Grand Est in north-eastern France.

== See also ==
- Communes of the Moselle department
