= Haute-Vigneulles =

- Commune
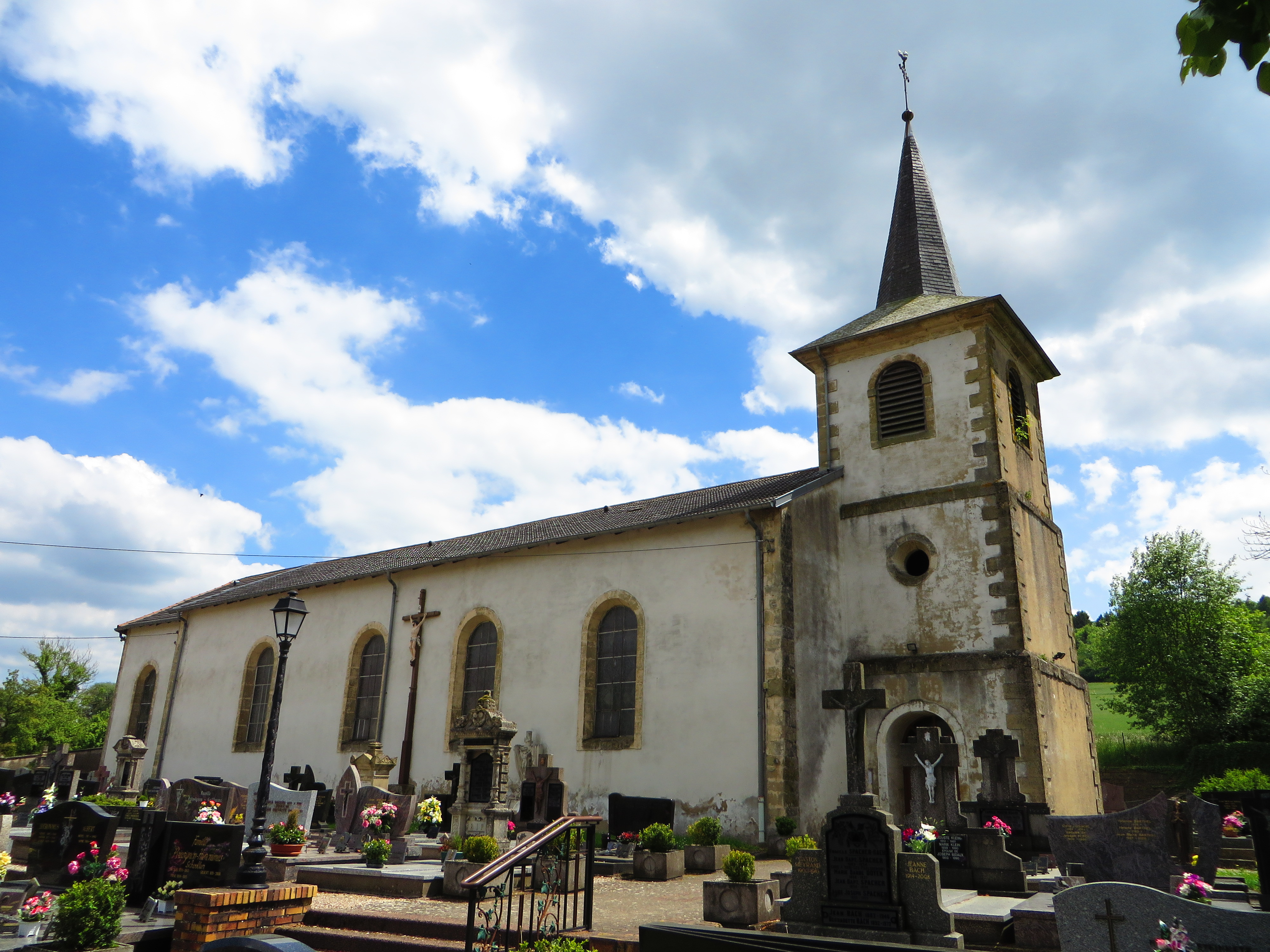
- The church in Haute-Vigneulles

- Coat of arms
- Location of Haute-Vigneulles
- Location within France Location within Grand Est
- Coordinates: 49°06′07″N 6°33′29″E
- Country: France
- Region: Grand Est
- Department: Moselle
- Arrondissement: Forbach-Boulay-Moselle
- Canton: Faulquemont
- Intercommunality: District urbain de Faulquemont

Government
  - Mayor (2020–2026): Danièle Staub
- Area^{1}: 9.53 km^{2} (3.68 sq mi)
- Elevation: 300 m (980 ft)
- Highest elevation: 384 m (1,260 ft)
- Lowest elevation: 234 m (768 ft)
- Population (2023): 438
  - Density: 46.0/km^{2} (119/sq mi)
- Time zone: UTC+01:00 (CET)
  - Summer (DST): UTC+02:00 (CEST)
- INSEE/Postal code: 57714 /57690
- ^{1} French Land Register data, which excludes lakes, ponds, glaciers > 1 km^{2} (0.386 sq mi or 247 acres) and river estuaries.

Haute-Vigneulles (French pronunciation: [ot viɲœl]; German: Oberfillen) is a commune in the Moselle department in Grand Est in north-eastern France.

Localities in the commune include Basse Vigneulles.

== See also ==
- Communes of the Moselle department
