= Saint-François-Lacroix =

- Commune
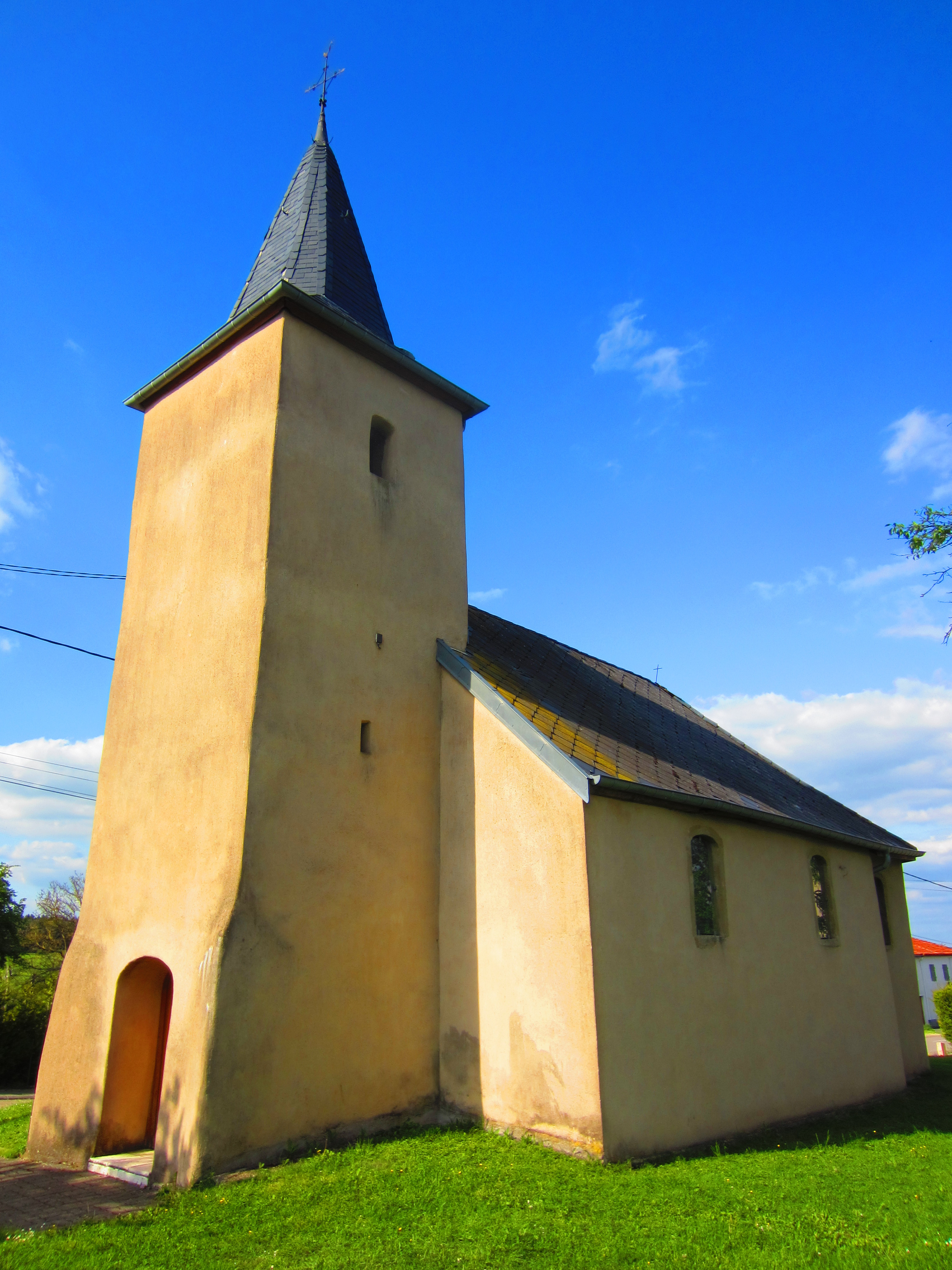
- The chapel in Saint-François-Lacroix

- Coat of arms
- Location of Saint-François-Lacroix
- Location within France Location within Grand Est
- Coordinates: 49°20′40″N 6°26′34″E
- Country: France
- Region: Grand Est
- Department: Moselle
- Arrondissement: Forbach-Boulay-Moselle
- Canton: Bouzonville

Government
  - Mayor (2020–2026): Jean-Claude Haubert
- Area^{1}: 7.33 km^{2} (2.83 sq mi)
- Elevation: 268 m (879 ft)
- Highest elevation: 296 m (971 ft)
- Lowest elevation: 228 m (748 ft)
- Population (2023): 317
  - Density: 43.2/km^{2} (112/sq mi)
- Time zone: UTC+01:00 (CET)
  - Summer (DST): UTC+02:00 (CEST)
- INSEE/Postal code: 57610 /57320
- ^{1} French Land Register data, which excludes lakes, ponds, glaciers > 1 km^{2} (0.386 sq mi or 247 acres) and river estuaries.

Saint-François-Lacroix (French pronunciation: [sɛ̃ fʁɑ̃swa lakʁwa]; German: Sankt Franz) is a commune in the Moselle department in Grand Est in north-eastern France.

== See also ==
- Communes of the Moselle department
