= Bassompierre =

Bassompierre is a French toponymic surname for someone from Bassompierre in Moselle. Notable people with the surname include:

- Charles-Augustin Bassompierre (1771–1853), French playwright and goguettier, writing under the pen name Sewrin
- François de Bassompierre (1579–1646), French courtier and Marshal of France
- Jean Bassompierre (1914–1948), French military officer and far-right activist
- Joseph Bassompierre-Sewrin (1914–1948), French architect
- Michel Bassompierre (1948–2026), French animalier
- Yolande de Bassompierre (1536–1621), French Catholic nun
