= Flastroff =

- Commune
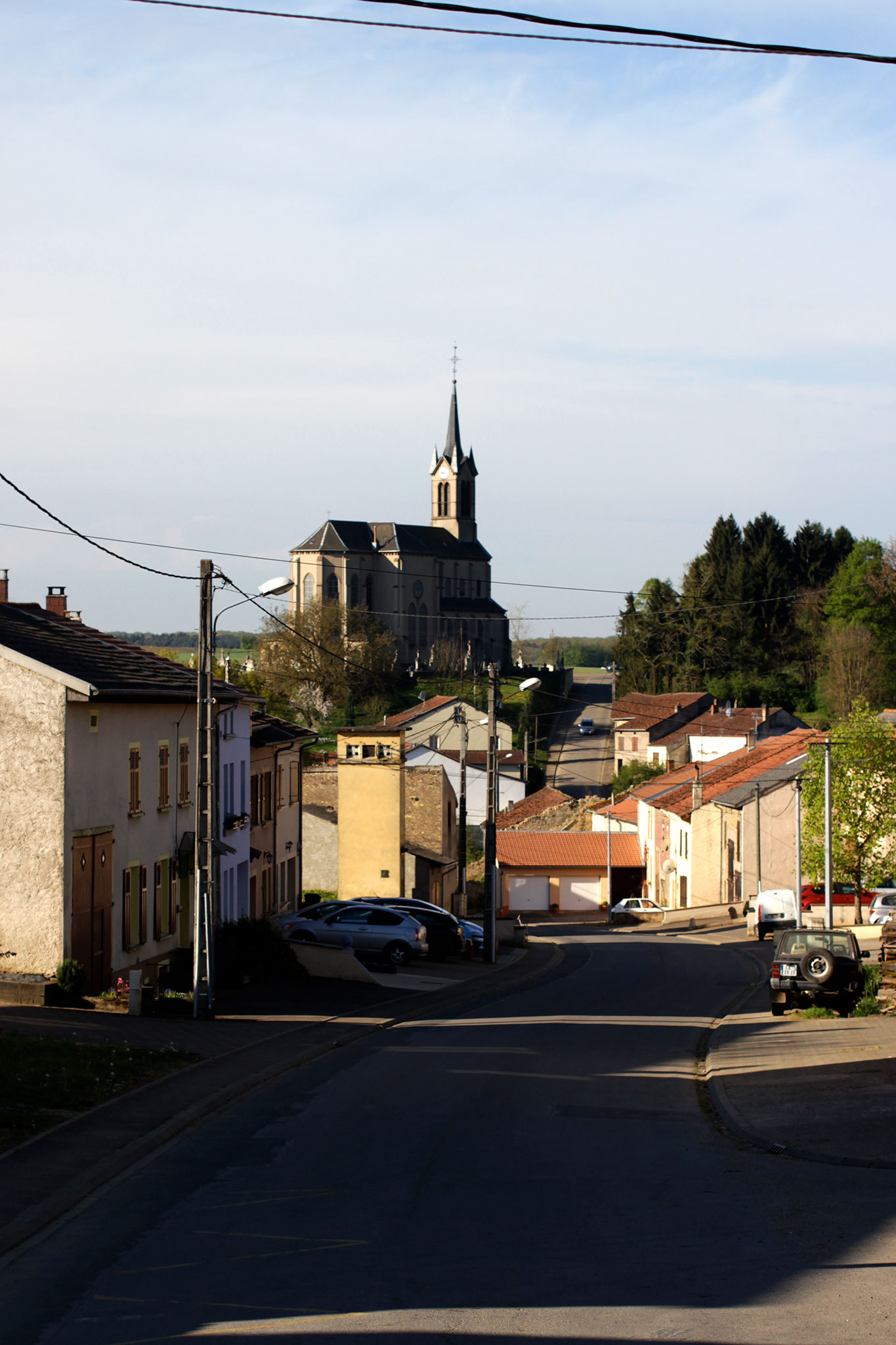
- The Rue Saint-Éloi in Flastroff

- Coat of arms
- Location of Flastroff
- Location within France Location within Grand Est
- Coordinates: 49°22′03″N 6°32′01″E
- Country: France
- Region: Grand Est
- Department: Moselle
- Arrondissement: Thionville
- Canton: Bouzonville
- Intercommunality: Bouzonvillois-Trois Frontières

Government
  - Mayor (2020–2026): Roland Schneider
- Area^{1}: 8.38 km^{2} (3.24 sq mi)
- Elevation: 220 m (720 ft)
- Highest elevation: 307 m (1,007 ft)
- Lowest elevation: 214 m (702 ft)
- Population (2023): 373
  - Density: 44.5/km^{2} (115/sq mi)
- Time zone: UTC+01:00 (CET)
  - Summer (DST): UTC+02:00 (CEST)
- INSEE/Postal code: 57215 /57320
- ^{1} French Land Register data, which excludes lakes, ponds, glaciers > 1 km^{2} (0.386 sq mi or 247 acres) and river estuaries.

Flastroff (French pronunciation: [flastʁɔf]; German: Flasdorf; Lorraine Franconian: Flooschtroff) is a commune in the Moselle department in Grand Est in north-eastern France.

Localities of the commune: Zeurange (German: Zeringen).

== See also ==
- Communes of the Moselle department
