= Anzeling =

- Commune
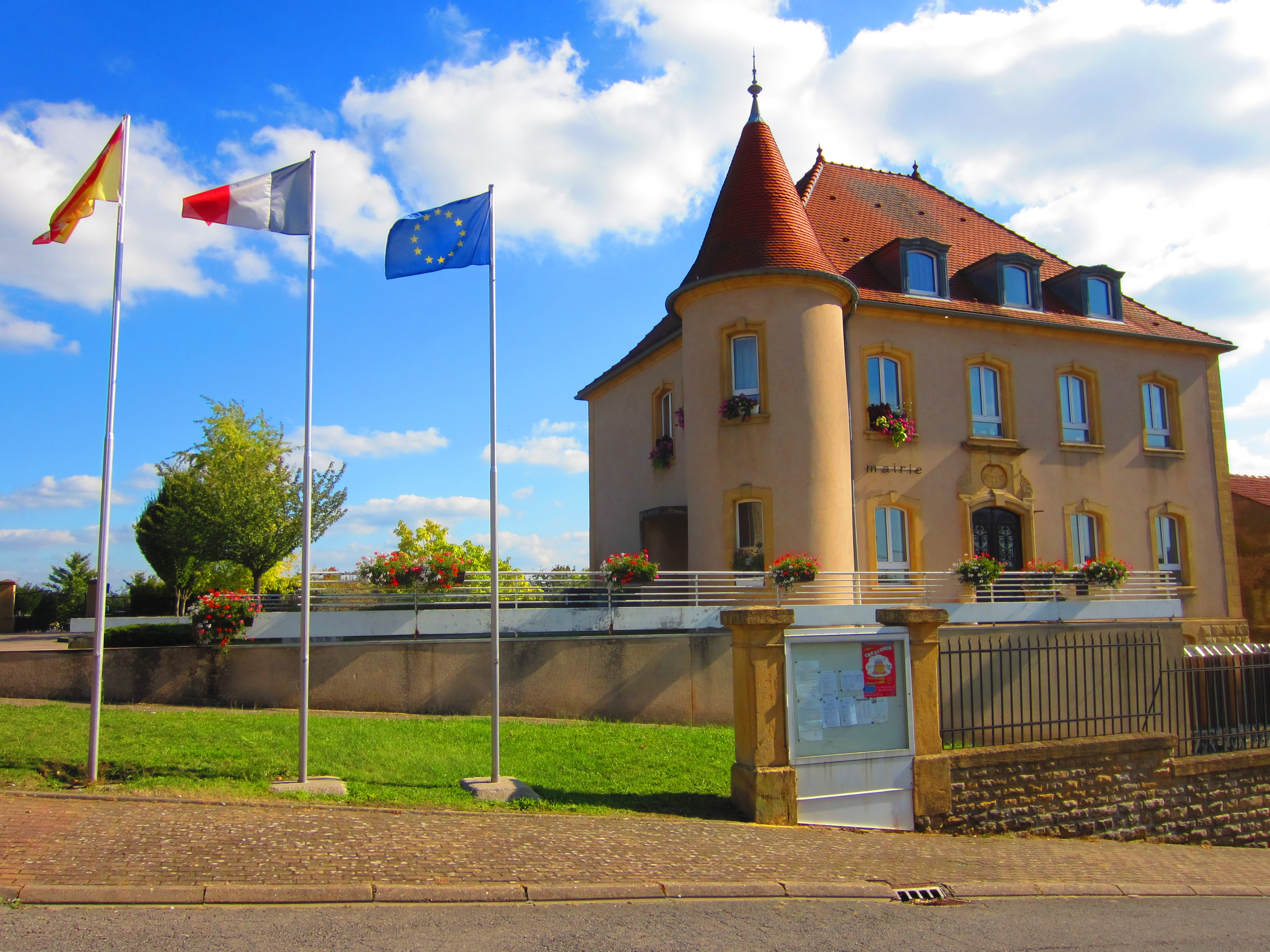
- The town hall in Anzeling

- Coat of arms
- Location of Anzeling
- Location within France Location within Grand Est
- Coordinates: 49°15′49″N 6°28′01″E
- Country: France
- Region: Grand Est
- Department: Moselle
- Arrondissement: Forbach-Boulay-Moselle
- Canton: Bouzonville

Government
  - Mayor (2020–2026): Alain Pierrot
- Area^{1}: 5.92 km^{2} (2.29 sq mi)
- Elevation: 300 m (980 ft)
- Highest elevation: 258 m (846 ft)
- Lowest elevation: 197 m (646 ft)
- Population (2023): 480
  - Density: 81/km^{2} (210/sq mi)
- Time zone: UTC+01:00 (CET)
  - Summer (DST): UTC+02:00 (CEST)
- INSEE/Postal code: 57025 /57320
- ^{1} French Land Register data, which excludes lakes, ponds, glaciers > 1 km^{2} (0.386 sq mi or 247 acres) and river estuaries.

Anzeling (French pronunciation: [ɑ̃zlɛ̃]; German: Anzelingen) is a commune in the Moselle department in Grand Est in northeastern France.

== Population ==
Historical population
Year	Pop.	±% p.a.
1968	309	—
1975	302	−0.33%
1982	309	+0.33%
1990	366	+2.14%
1999	379	+0.39%
2007	467	+2.64%
2012	512	+1.86%
2017	521	+0.35%
2023	480	−1.36%
Source: INSEE

== See also ==
- Communes of the Moselle department
