= Merschweiller =

- Commune
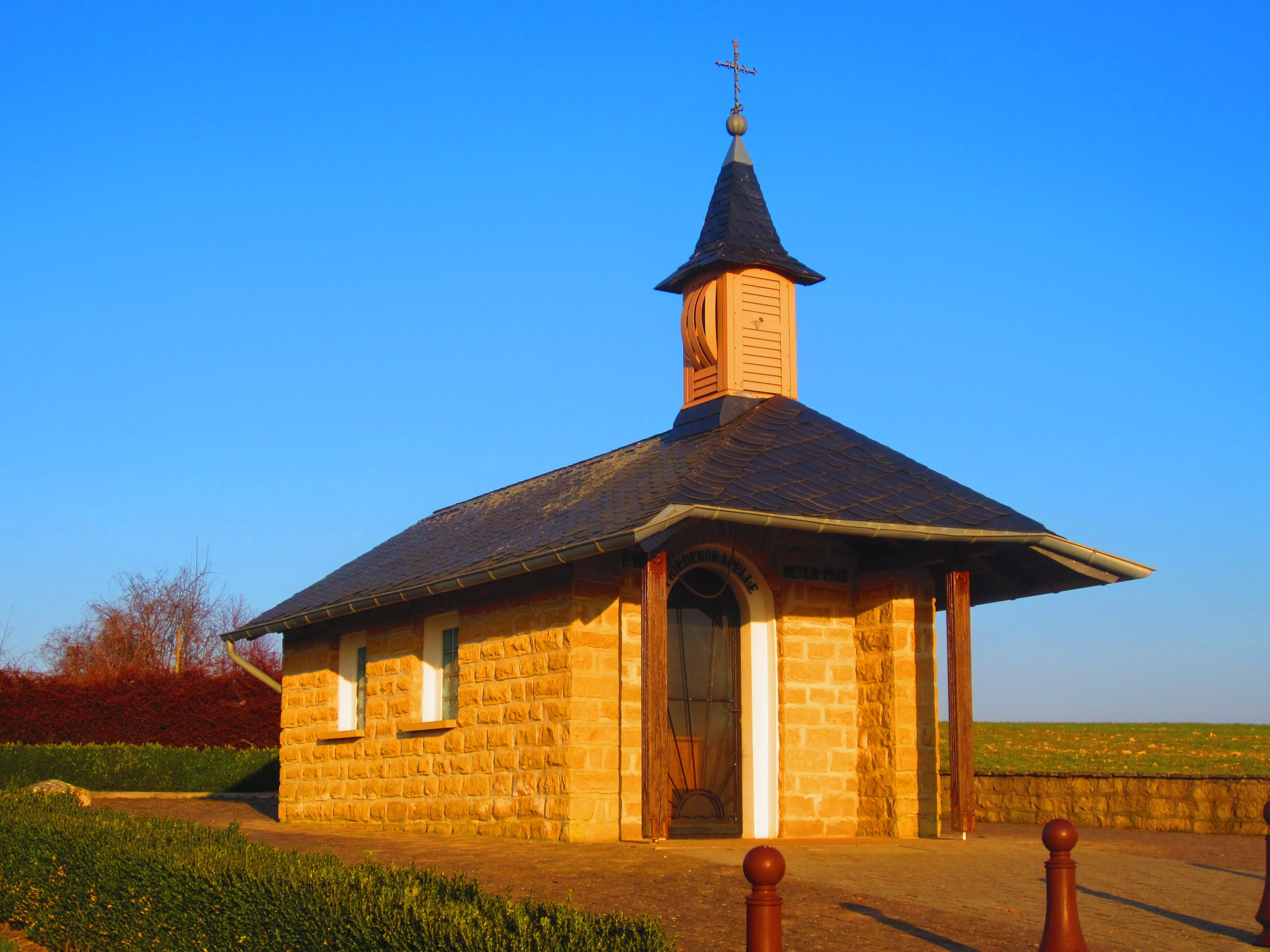
- The chapel in Merschweiller

- Coat of arms
- Location of Merschweiller
- Location within France Location within Grand Est
- Coordinates: 49°27′46″N 6°25′10″E
- Country: France
- Region: Grand Est
- Department: Moselle
- Arrondissement: Thionville
- Canton: Bouzonville
- Intercommunality: Bouzonvillois-Trois Frontières

Government
  - Mayor (2020–2026): René Breit
- Area^{1}: 5.76 km^{2} (2.22 sq mi)
- Elevation: 311 m (1,020 ft)
- Highest elevation: 431 m (1,414 ft)
- Lowest elevation: 185 m (607 ft)
- Population (2023): 290
  - Density: 50/km^{2} (130/sq mi)
- Time zone: UTC+01:00 (CET)
  - Summer (DST): UTC+02:00 (CEST)
- INSEE/Postal code: 57459 /57480
- ^{1} French Land Register data, which excludes lakes, ponds, glaciers > 1 km^{2} (0.386 sq mi or 247 acres) and river estuaries.

Merschweiller (German: Merschweiler) is a commune in the Moselle department in Grand Est in north-eastern France.

== See also ==
- Communes of the Moselle department
