= Roupeldange =

- Commune
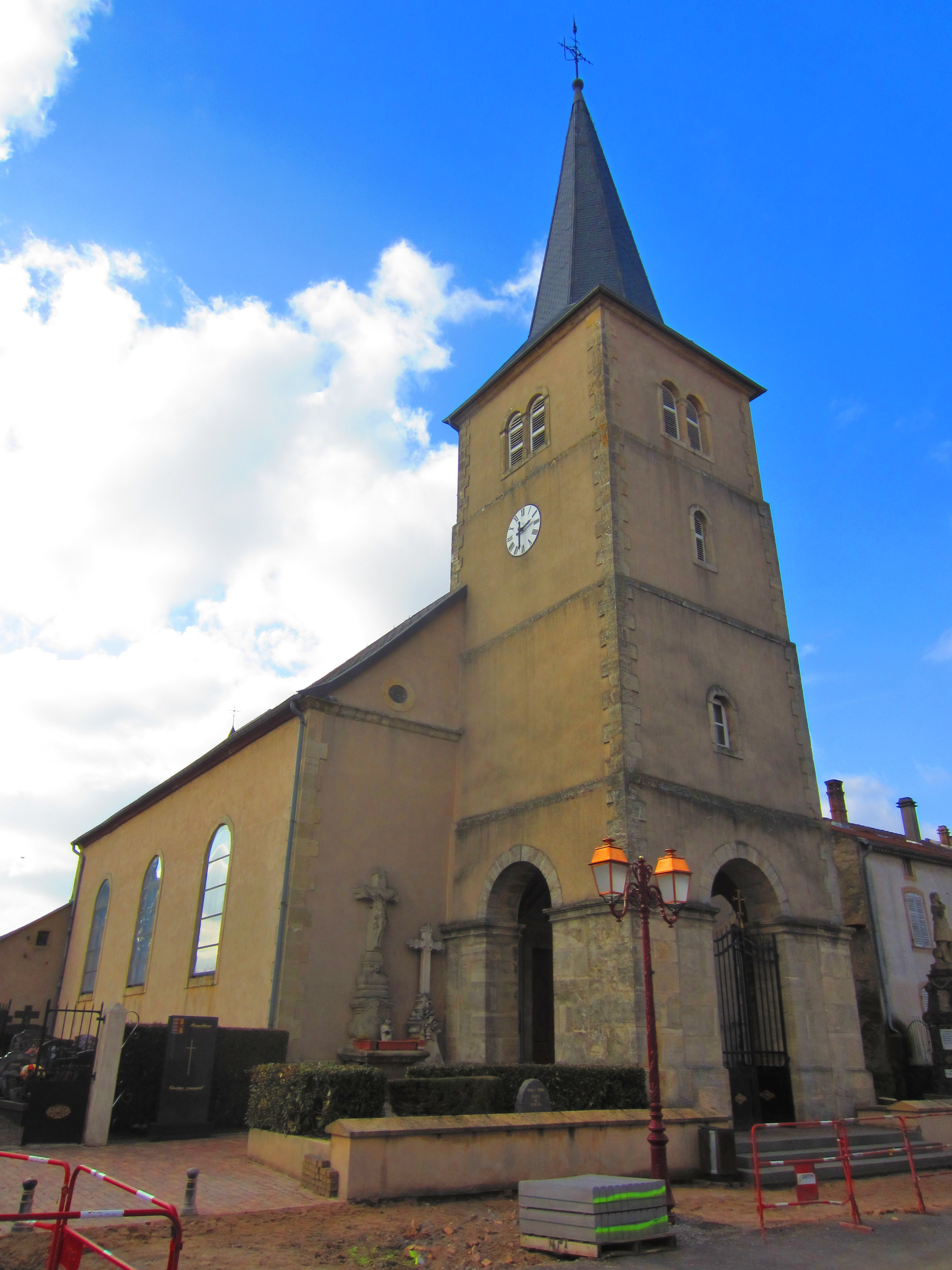
- The church in Roupeldange

- Coat of arms
- Location of Roupeldange
- Location within France Location within Grand Est
- Coordinates: 49°12′29″N 6°28′10″E
- Country: France
- Region: Grand Est
- Department: Moselle
- Arrondissement: Forbach-Boulay-Moselle
- Canton: Boulay-Moselle
- Intercommunality: CC Houve-Pays Boulageois

Government
  - Mayor (2020–2026): Germain Vaillant
- Area^{1}: 2.52 km^{2} (0.97 sq mi)
- Elevation: 220 m (720 ft)
- Highest elevation: 242 m (794 ft)
- Lowest elevation: 198 m (650 ft)
- Population (2023): 326
  - Density: 129/km^{2} (335/sq mi)
- Time zone: UTC+01:00 (CET)
  - Summer (DST): UTC+02:00 (CEST)
- INSEE/Postal code: 57599 /57220
- ^{1} French Land Register data, which excludes lakes, ponds, glaciers > 1 km^{2} (0.386 sq mi or 247 acres) and river estuaries.

Roupeldange (French pronunciation: [ʁupɛldɑ̃ʒ]; German: Ruplingen) is a commune in the Moselle department in Grand Est in north-eastern France.

== See also ==
- Communes of the Moselle department
