= Vittoncourt =

- Commune
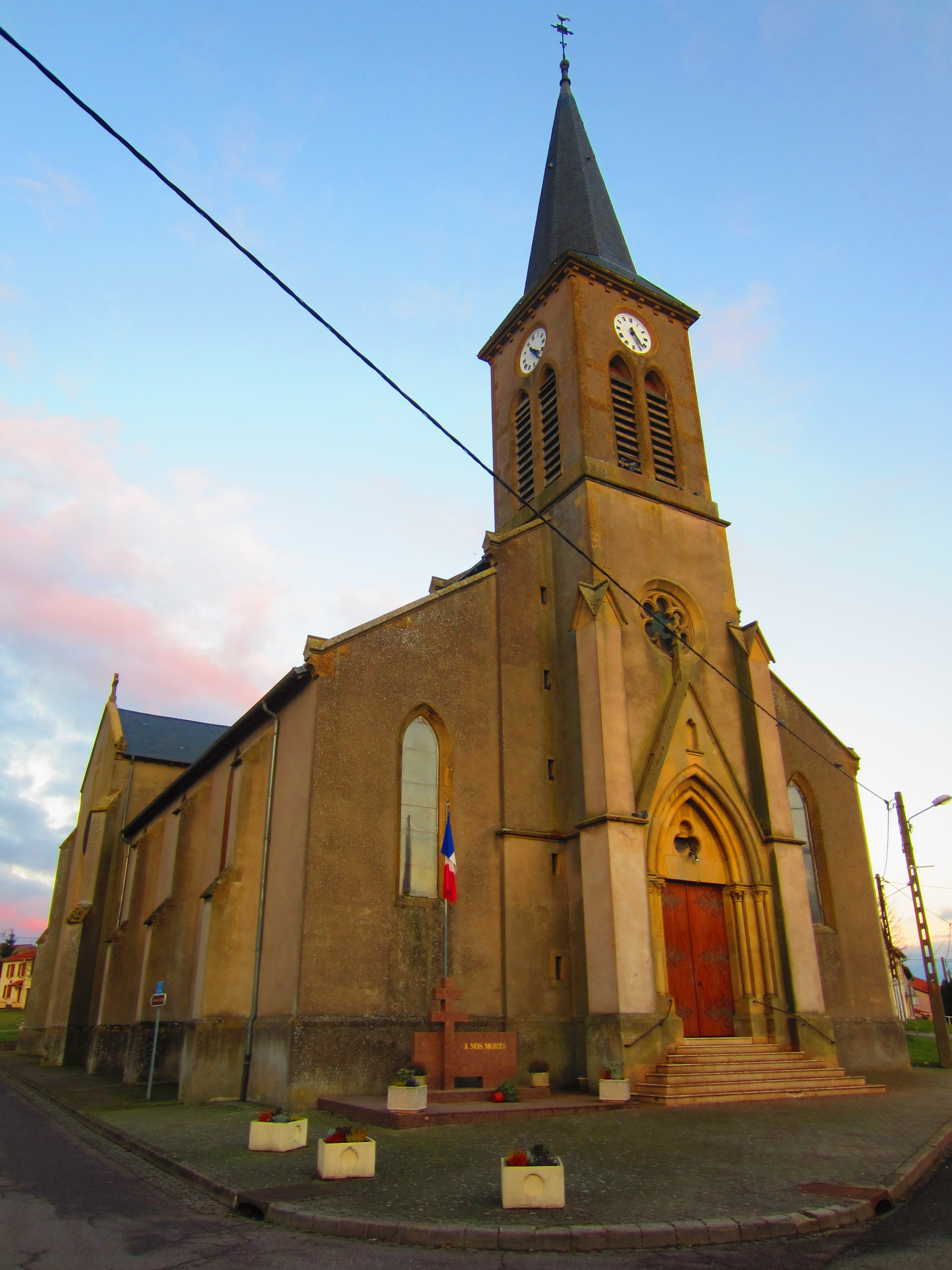
- The church in Vittoncourt

- Coat of arms
- Location of Vittoncourt
- Location within France Location within Grand Est
- Coordinates: 49°01′17″N 6°25′50″E
- Country: France
- Region: Grand Est
- Department: Moselle
- Arrondissement: Forbach-Boulay-Moselle
- Canton: Faulquemont
- Intercommunality: District Urbain de Faulquemont

Government
  - Mayor (2020–2026): Laurent Grandgirard
- Area^{1}: 9.51 km^{2} (3.67 sq mi)
- Elevation: 250 m (820 ft)
- Highest elevation: 277 m (909 ft)
- Lowest elevation: 221 m (725 ft)
- Population (2023): 390
  - Density: 41/km^{2} (110/sq mi)
- Time zone: UTC+01:00 (CET)
  - Summer (DST): UTC+02:00 (CEST)
- INSEE/Postal code: 57726 /57580
- ^{1} French Land Register data, which excludes lakes, ponds, glaciers > 1 km^{2} (0.386 sq mi or 247 acres) and river estuaries.

Vittoncourt (French pronunciation: [vitɔ̃kuʁ]; German: Wittenhofen an der Nied) is a commune in the Moselle department in Grand Est in north-eastern France.

== See also ==
- Communes of the Moselle department
