= Bannay, Moselle =

Bannay
- Commune
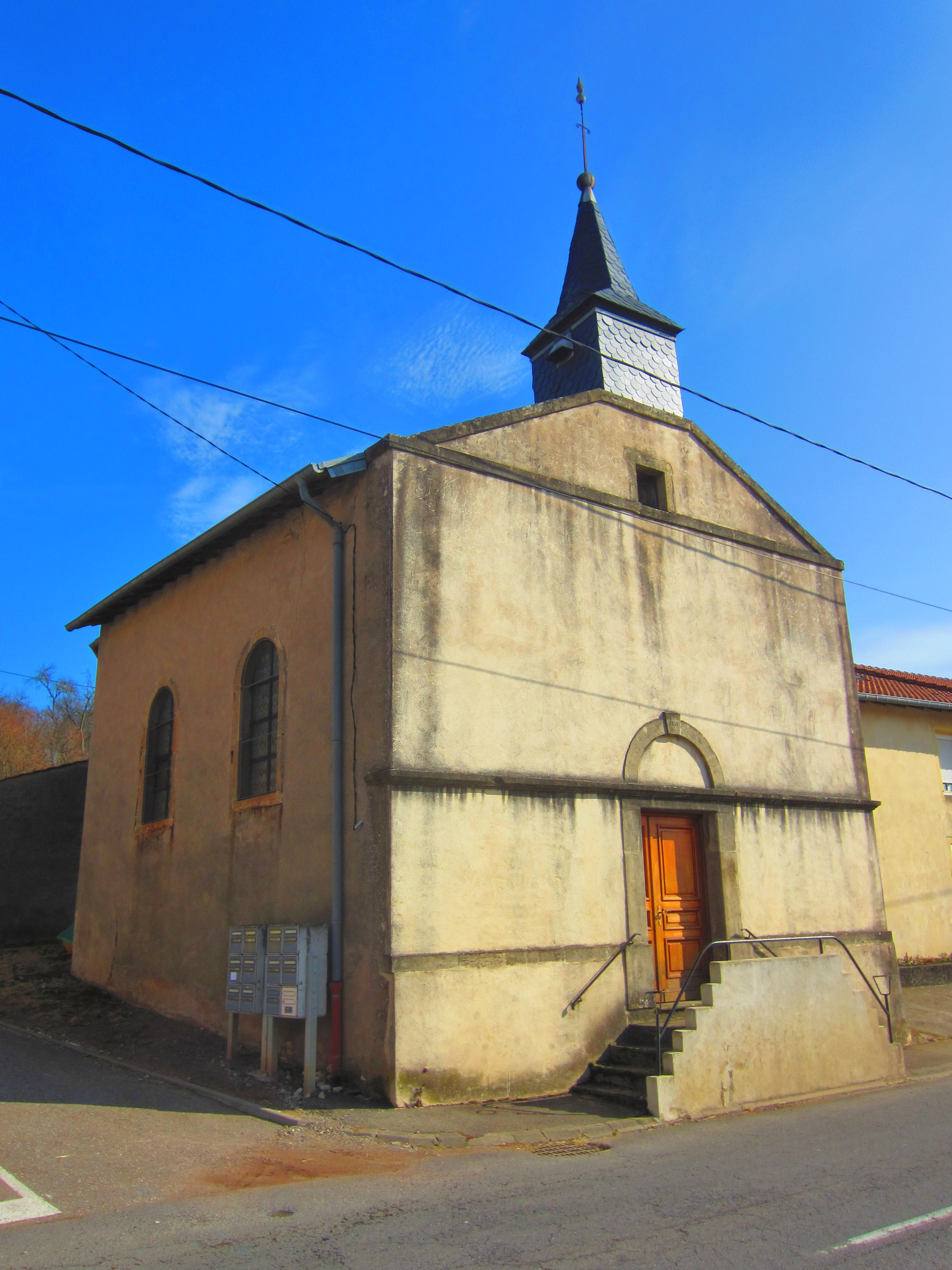
- The chapel in Bannay

- Coat of arms
- Location of Bannay
- Location within France Location within Grand Est
- Coordinates: 49°07′41″N 6°28′06″E
- Country: France
- Region: Grand Est
- Department: Moselle
- Arrondissement: Forbach-Boulay-Moselle
- Canton: Boulay-Moselle

Government
  - Mayor (2020–2026): François Gossler
- Area^{1}: 4.11 km^{2} (1.59 sq mi)
- Elevation: 220 m (720 ft)
- Highest elevation: 327 m (1,073 ft)
- Lowest elevation: 212 m (696 ft)
- Population (2023): 78
  - Density: 19/km^{2} (49/sq mi)
- Time zone: UTC+01:00 (CET)
  - Summer (DST): UTC+02:00 (CEST)
- INSEE/Postal code: 57048 /57220
- ^{1} French Land Register data, which excludes lakes, ponds, glaciers > 1 km^{2} (0.386 sq mi or 247 acres) and river estuaries.

Bannay (French pronunciation: [banɛ]; German: Bizingen) is a commune in the Moselle department in Grand Est in northeastern France.

== Population ==
Historical population
Year	Pop.	±% p.a.
1968	69	—
1975	61	−1.75%
1982	72	+2.40%
1990	78	+1.01%
1999	71	−1.04%
2007	78	+1.18%
2012	77	−0.26%
2017	73	−1.06%
2023	78	+1.11%
Source: INSEE

== See also ==
- Communes of the Moselle department
