= Heining-lès-Bouzonville =

- Commune
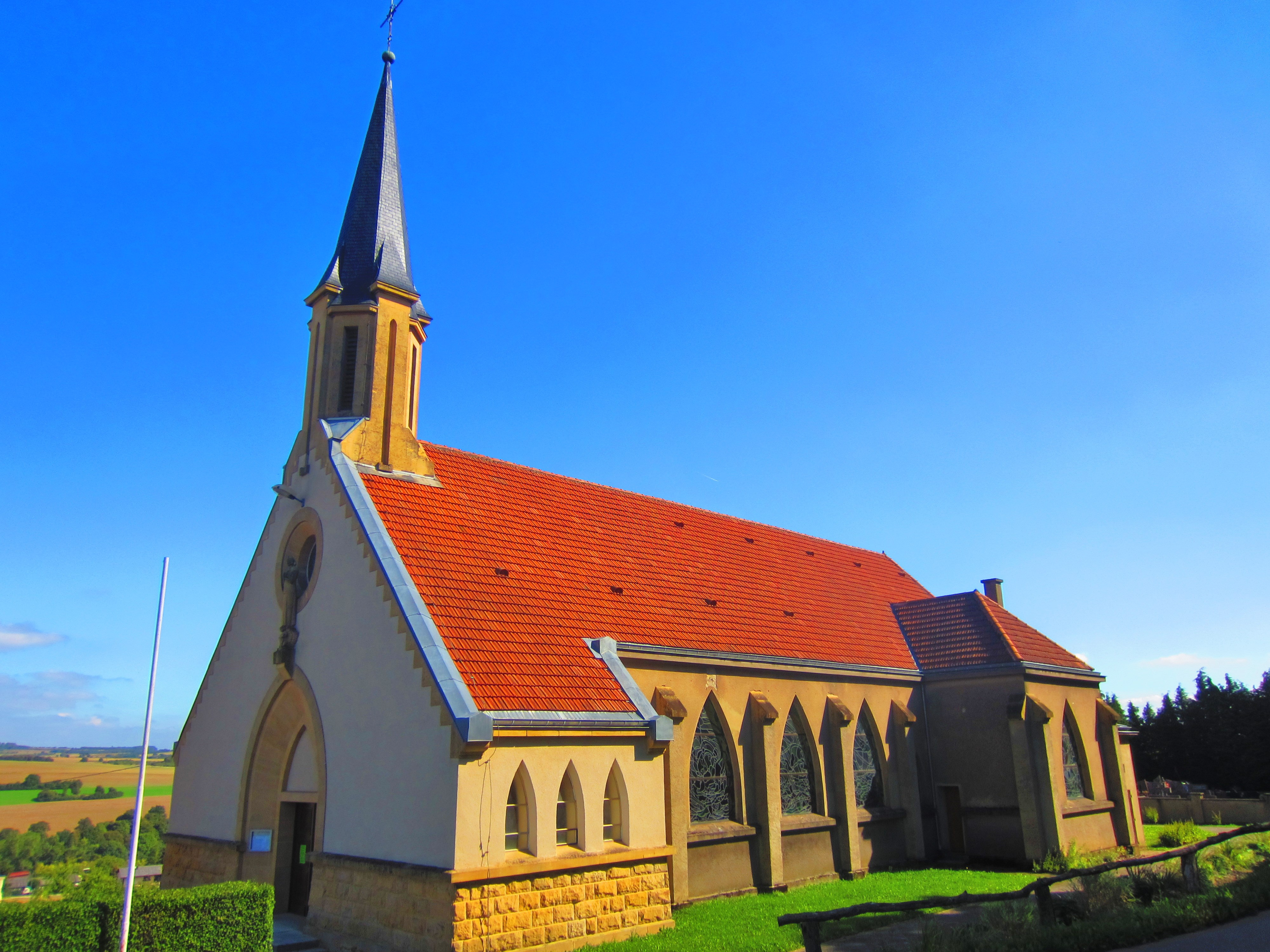
- The church in Heining-lès-Bouzonville

- Coat of arms
- Location of Heining-lès-Bouzonville
- Location within France Location within Grand Est
- Coordinates: 49°18′36″N 6°35′22″E
- Country: France
- Region: Grand Est
- Department: Moselle
- Arrondissement: Forbach-Boulay-Moselle
- Canton: Bouzonville
- Intercommunality: Bouzonvillois - Trois Frontières

Government
  - Mayor (2020–2026): Astrid Lemarchand
- Area^{1}: 6.03 km^{2} (2.33 sq mi)
- Elevation: 366 m (1,201 ft)
- Highest elevation: 336 m (1,102 ft)
- Lowest elevation: 223 m (732 ft)
- Population (2023): 487
  - Density: 80.8/km^{2} (209/sq mi)
- Time zone: UTC+01:00 (CET)
  - Summer (DST): UTC+02:00 (CEST)
- INSEE/Postal code: 57309 /57320
- ^{1} French Land Register data, which excludes lakes, ponds, glaciers > 1 km^{2} (0.386 sq mi or 247 acres) and river estuaries.

Heining-lès-Bouzonville (French pronunciation: [ɛnɛ̃ lɛ buzɔ̃vil], literally Heining near Bouzonville; German: Heiningen bei Busendorf) is a commune in the Moselle department in Grand Est in north-eastern France. It is just 500m from the border with Germany.

It takes its name from the Abbey of Bouzonville. It was variously in the ownership of the Abbey at Bouzonville and the Abbey of St Maximin in Trier.

From 1815 it was a border town. In the 1930s, the border between France and the Saarland was closed; the French government funded a new church for Heining, the church of Sainte-Jeanne d'Arc de Leiding.

== See also ==
- Communes of the Moselle department
