= Neunkirchen-lès-Bouzonville =

- Commune
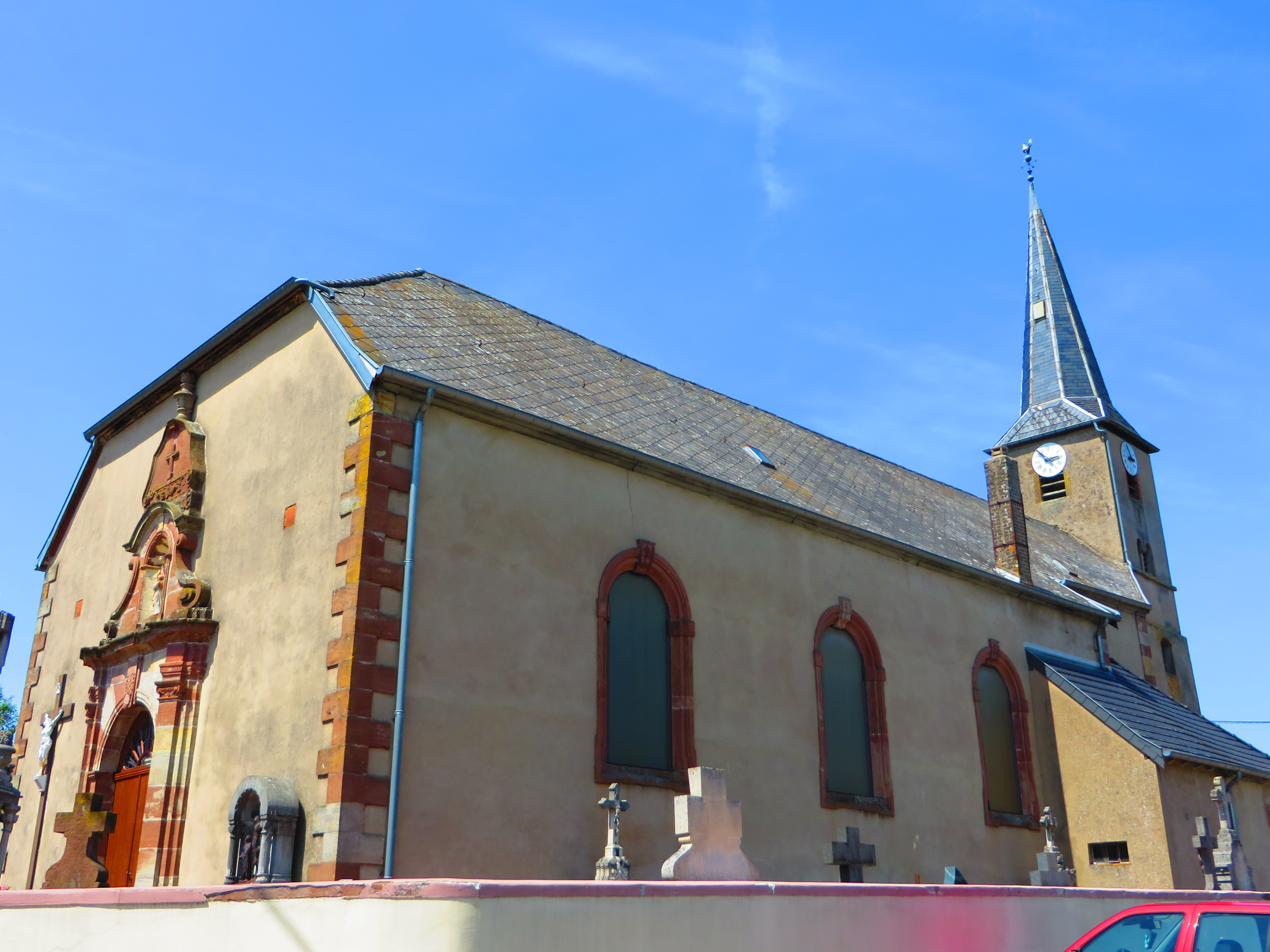
- The church in Neunkirchen-lès-Bouzonville

- Coat of arms
- Location of Neunkirchen-lès-Bouzonville
- Location within France Location within Grand Est
- Coordinates: 49°21′19″N 6°33′20″E
- Country: France
- Region: Grand Est
- Department: Moselle
- Arrondissement: Forbach-Boulay-Moselle
- Canton: Bouzonville
- Intercommunality: Bouzonvillois - Trois Frontières

Government
  - Mayor (2020–2026): François Ettenhuber
- Area^{1}: 3.8 km^{2} (1.5 sq mi)
- Highest elevation: 388 m (1,273 ft)
- Lowest elevation: 265 m (869 ft)
- Population (2023): 325
  - Density: 86/km^{2} (220/sq mi)
- Time zone: UTC+01:00 (CET)
  - Summer (DST): UTC+02:00 (CEST)
- INSEE/Postal code: 57502 /57320
- ^{1} French Land Register data, which excludes lakes, ponds, glaciers > 1 km^{2} (0.386 sq mi or 247 acres) and river estuaries.

Neunkirchen-lès-Bouzonville (French pronunciation: [nœnkiʁʃən lɛ buzɔ̃vil], lit. 'Neunkirchen near Bouzonville'; German: Neunkirchen) is a commune in the Moselle department in Grand Est in north-eastern France.

== See also ==
- Communes of the Moselle department
