= Falck, Moselle =

Falck
- Commune
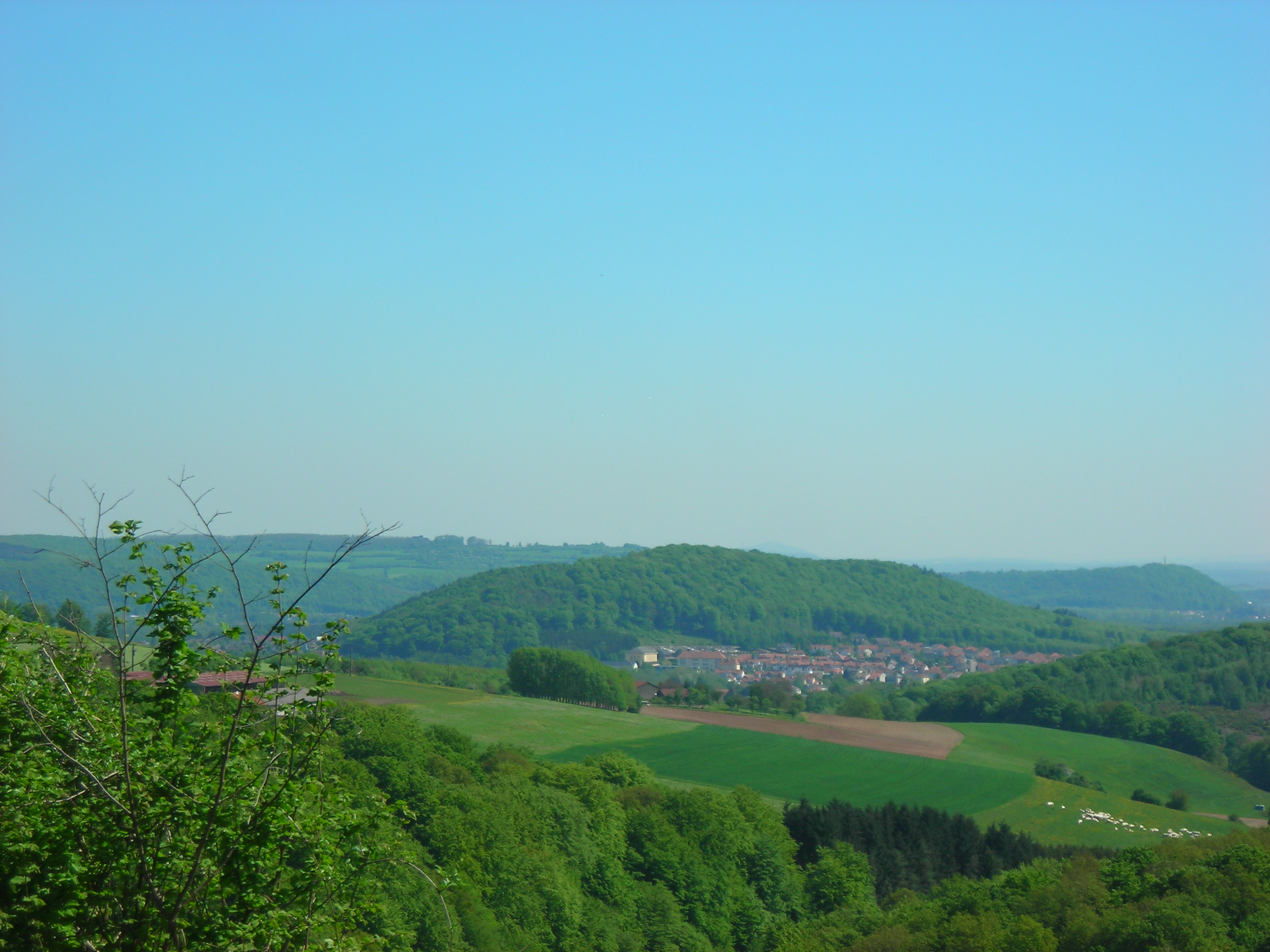
- A general view of Falck

- Coat of arms
- Location of Falck
- Location within France Location within Grand Est
- Coordinates: 49°14′N 6°38′E
- Country: France
- Region: Grand Est
- Department: Moselle
- Arrondissement: Forbach-Boulay-Moselle
- Canton: Bouzonville
- Intercommunality: CC Houve-Pays Boulageois

Government
  - Mayor (2020–2026): Pascal Rapp
- Area^{1}: 6.07 km^{2} (2.34 sq mi)
- Elevation: 220 m (720 ft)
- Population (2023): 2,482
  - Density: 409/km^{2} (1,060/sq mi)
- Demonym(s): Falckois, Falckoise
- Time zone: UTC+01:00 (CET)
  - Summer (DST): UTC+02:00 (CEST)
- INSEE/Postal code: 57205 /57550
- ^{1} French Land Register data, which excludes lakes, ponds, glaciers > 1 km^{2} (0.386 sq mi or 247 acres) and river estuaries.

Falck (French pronunciation: [falk]; German: Falk) is a commune in the Moselle department in Grand Est in north-eastern France. It is immediately east of Hargarten-aux-Mines, separated by the river Banngraben.

== Population ==
Historical population
Year	Pop.	±% p.a.
1968	2,505	—
1975	2,528	+0.13%
1982	2,737	+1.14%
1990	2,720	−0.08%
1999	2,632	−0.36%
2007	2,591	−0.20%
2012	2,516	−0.59%
2017	2,487	−0.23%
2023	2,482	−0.03%
Source: INSEE

== See also ==
- Communes of the Moselle department
