= Dalstein =

- Commune
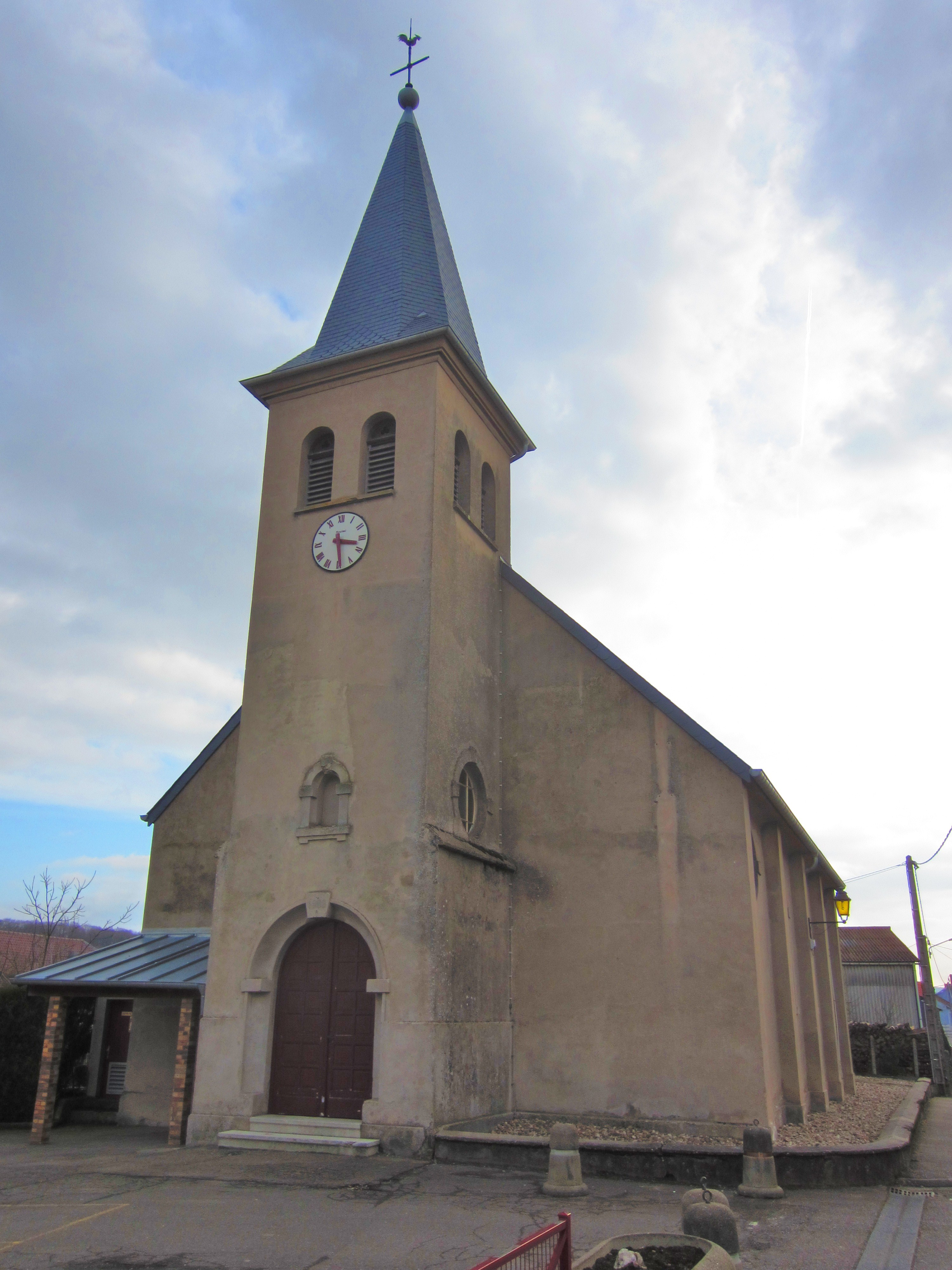
- The church in Dalstein

- Coat of arms
- Location of Dalstein
- Location within France Location within Grand Est
- Coordinates: 49°18′31″N 6°24′41″E
- Country: France
- Region: Grand Est
- Department: Moselle
- Arrondissement: Forbach-Boulay-Moselle
- Canton: Bouzonville
- Intercommunality: Bouzonvillois - Trois Frontières

Government
  - Mayor (2020–2026): Claude Brignon
- Area^{1}: 3.97 km^{2} (1.53 sq mi)
- Elevation: 234 m (768 ft)
- Highest elevation: 337 m (1,106 ft)
- Lowest elevation: 222 m (728 ft)
- Population (2023): 376
  - Density: 94.7/km^{2} (245/sq mi)
- Time zone: UTC+01:00 (CET)
  - Summer (DST): UTC+02:00 (CEST)
- INSEE/Postal code: 57167 /57320
- ^{1} French Land Register data, which excludes lakes, ponds, glaciers > 1 km^{2} (0.386 sq mi or 247 acres) and river estuaries.

Dalstein (German: Dalstein) is a commune in the Moselle department in Grand Est in north-eastern France.

== See also ==
- Communes of the Moselle department
