= Château-Rouge =

Château-Rouge Roudendroff
- Commune
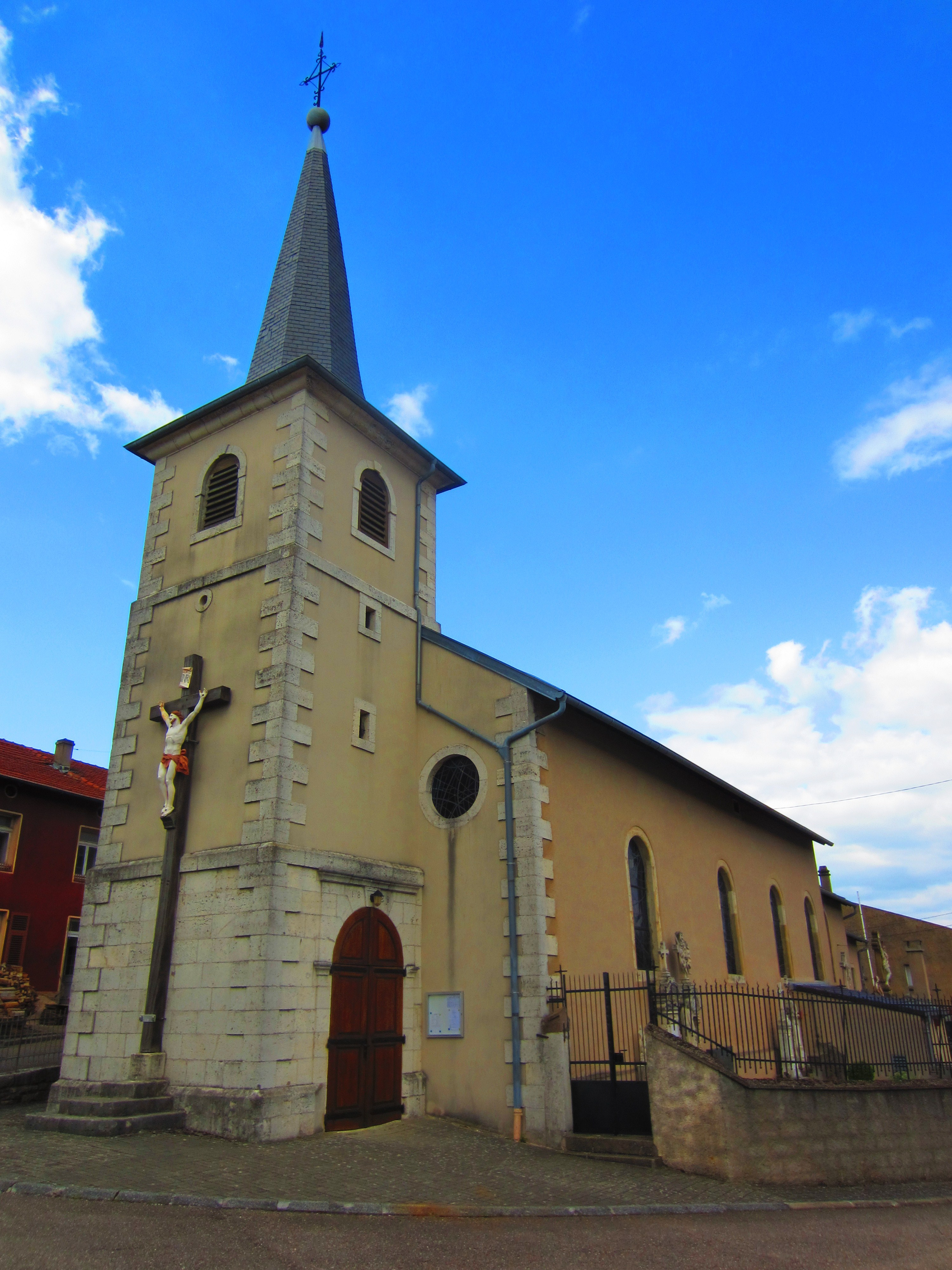
- The church in Château-Rouge

- Coat of arms
- Location of Château-Rouge
- Location within France Location within Grand Est
- Coordinates: 49°16′51″N 6°35′52″E
- Country: France
- Region: Grand Est
- Department: Moselle
- Arrondissement: Forbach-Boulay-Moselle
- Canton: Bouzonville
- Intercommunality: CC Houve-Pays Boulageois

Government
  - Mayor (2020–2026): René Bernard
- Area^{1}: 4.32 km^{2} (1.67 sq mi)
- Elevation: 300 m (980 ft)
- Highest elevation: 348 m (1,142 ft)
- Lowest elevation: 249 m (817 ft)
- Population (2023): 296
  - Density: 68.5/km^{2} (177/sq mi)
- Time zone: UTC+01:00 (CET)
  - Summer (DST): UTC+02:00 (CEST)
- INSEE/Postal code: 57131 /57320
- ^{1} French Land Register data, which excludes lakes, ponds, glaciers > 1 km^{2} (0.386 sq mi or 247 acres) and river estuaries.

Château-Rouge (French: [ʃɑto ʁuʒ]; Lorraine Franconian: Roudendroff; German: Rothendorf) is a commune in the Moselle department in Grand Est in north-eastern France.

Previous names: Ruchmestorf (1179), Rodendorp (1316), Rodendorf (1341), Rudendorf (1544), Roudendorff (1627), Chasteau-Rouge (1696), Rodendorf (1779), Château Rouge ou Rothdorf (1793), Rothdorff (1794–1795), Châteaurouge (1801).

== See also ==
- Communes of the Moselle department
