= Rémelfang =

- Commune
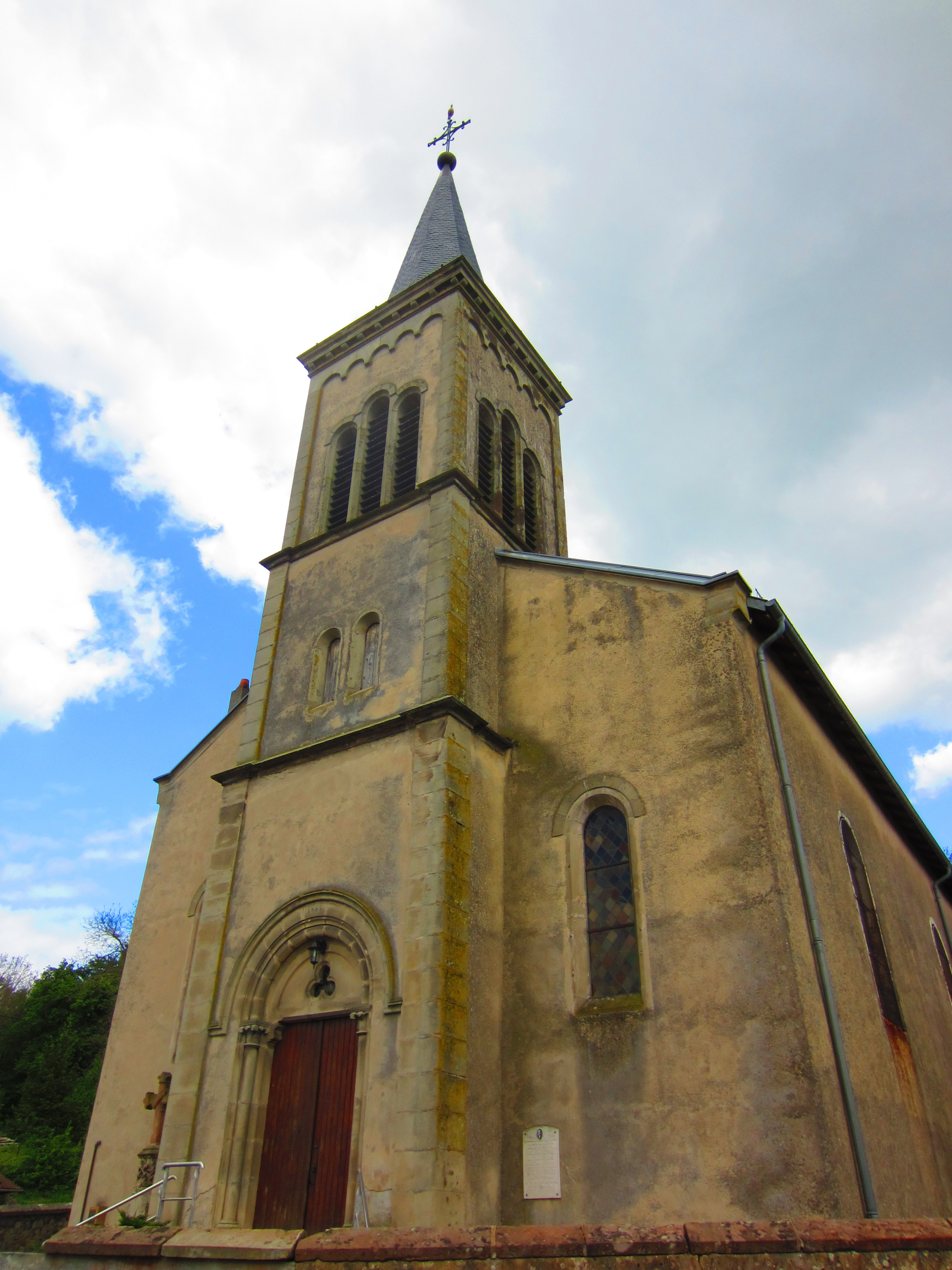
- The church in Rémelfang

- Coat of arms
- Location of Rémelfang
- Location within France Location within Grand Est
- Coordinates: 49°16′17″N 6°30′38″E
- Country: France
- Region: Grand Est
- Department: Moselle
- Arrondissement: Forbach-Boulay-Moselle
- Canton: Bouzonville
- Intercommunality: Bouzonvillois - Trois Frontières

Government
  - Mayor (2020–2026): Alphonse Masson
- Area^{1}: 3.3 km^{2} (1.3 sq mi)
- Elevation: 210 m (690 ft)
- Highest elevation: 301 m (988 ft)
- Lowest elevation: 195 m (640 ft)
- Population (2023): 147
  - Density: 45/km^{2} (120/sq mi)
- Time zone: UTC+01:00 (CET)
  - Summer (DST): UTC+02:00 (CEST)
- INSEE/Postal code: 57567 /57320
- ^{1} French Land Register data, which excludes lakes, ponds, glaciers > 1 km^{2} (0.386 sq mi or 247 acres) and river estuaries.

Rémelfang (German: Remelfangen) is a commune in the Moselle department in Grand Est in north-eastern France.

== Geography ==
It is located in the Rhine catchment area and is drained by the Bettange stream and the Esbach stream.

== See also ==
- Communes of the Moselle department
