= Haute-Kontz =

- Commune
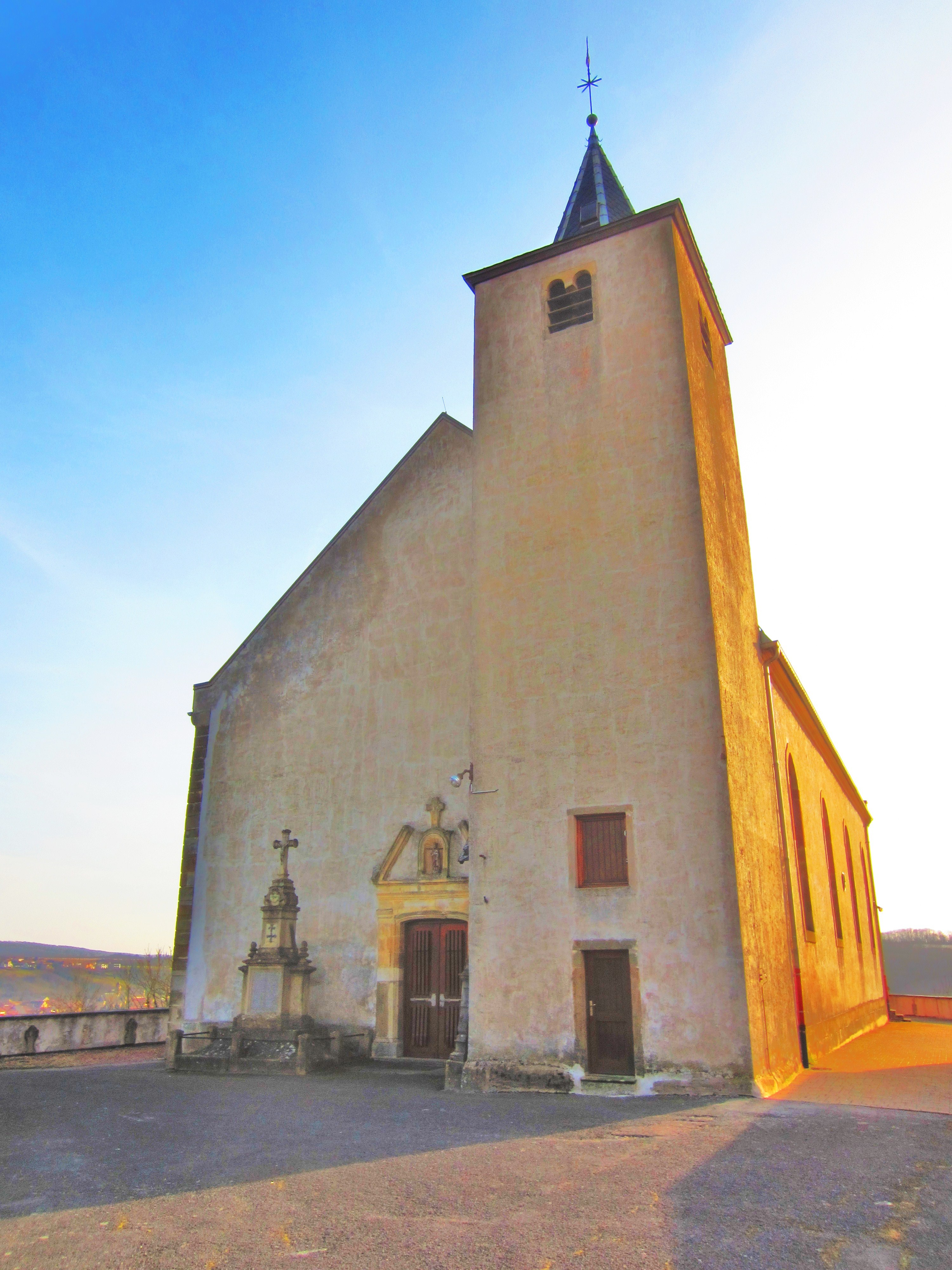
- The church in Haute-Kontz

- Coat of arms
- Location of Haute-Kontz
- Location within France Location within Grand Est
- Coordinates: 49°27′12″N 6°19′07″E
- Country: France
- Region: Grand Est
- Department: Moselle
- Arrondissement: Thionville
- Canton: Bouzonville
- Intercommunality: Bouzonvillois-Trois Frontières

Government
  - Mayor (2020–2026): Marie-Josée Thill
- Area^{1}: 6.41 km^{2} (2.47 sq mi)
- Elevation: 195 m (640 ft)
- Highest elevation: 286 m (938 ft)
- Lowest elevation: 145 m (476 ft)
- Population (2023): 532
  - Density: 83.0/km^{2} (215/sq mi)
- Time zone: UTC+01:00 (CET)
  - Summer (DST): UTC+02:00 (CEST)
- INSEE/Postal code: 57371 /57480
- ^{1} French Land Register data, which excludes lakes, ponds, glaciers > 1 km^{2} (0.386 sq mi or 247 acres) and river estuaries.

Haute-Kontz (German: Oberkontz, Lorraine Franconian: Uewer-Kontz/Uewer-Konz) is a commune in the Moselle department in Grand Est in north-eastern France.

The commune is located very close to the border with Luxembourg in the Pays de Sierck.

== See also ==
- Communes of the Moselle department
- Contz-les-Bains
