= Schwerdorff =

- Commune
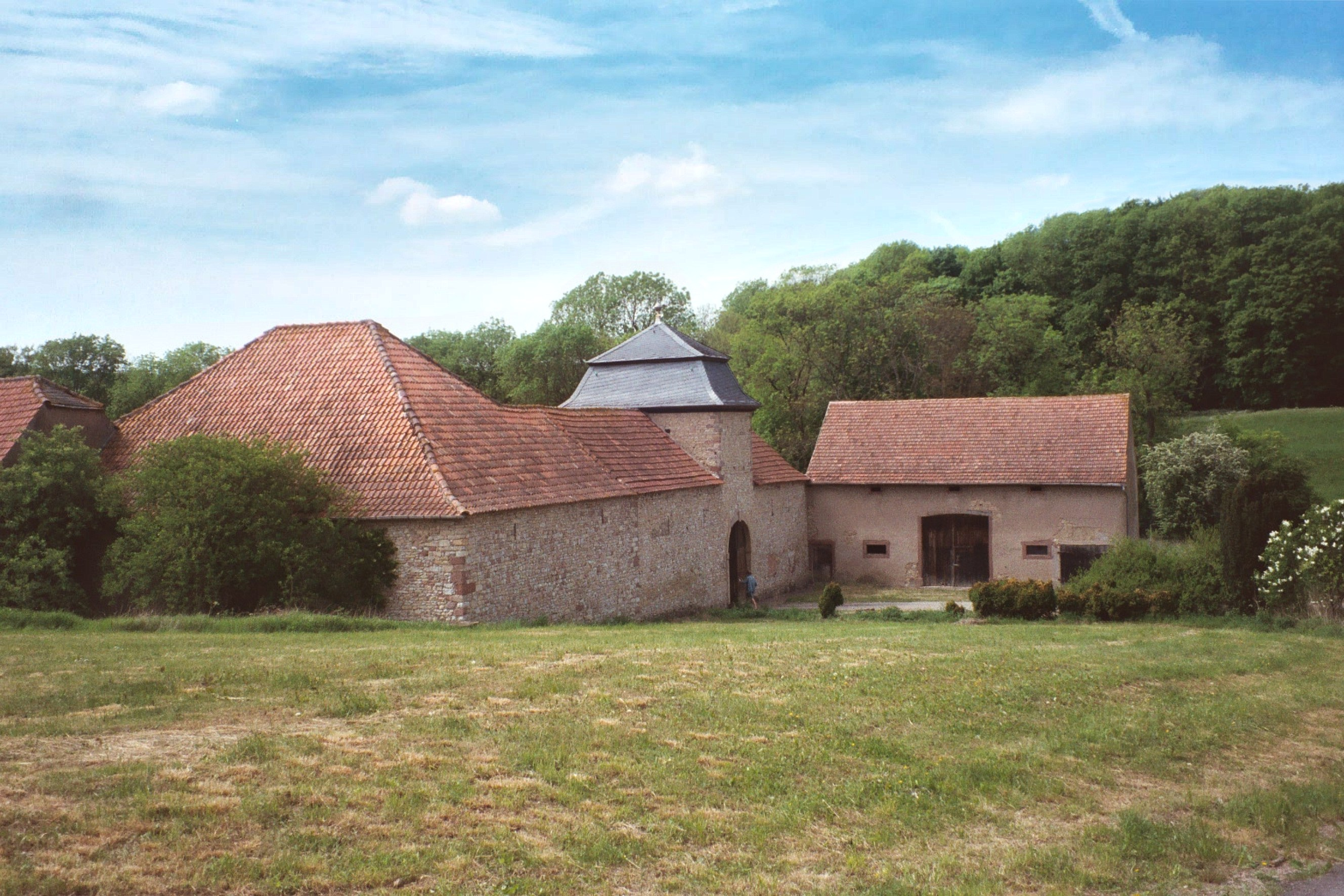
- Esch Castle in Schwerdorff

- Coat of arms
- Location of Schwerdorff
- Location within France Location within Grand Est
- Coordinates: 49°22′03″N 6°34′34″E
- Country: France
- Region: Grand Est
- Department: Moselle
- Arrondissement: Forbach-Boulay-Moselle
- Canton: Bouzonville
- Intercommunality: Bouzonvillois - Trois Frontières

Government
  - Mayor (2020–2026): Régis Sindt
- Area^{1}: 9.42 km^{2} (3.64 sq mi)
- Elevation: 286 m (938 ft)
- Highest elevation: 304 m (997 ft)
- Lowest elevation: 181 m (594 ft)
- Population (2023): 472
  - Density: 50.1/km^{2} (130/sq mi)
- Time zone: UTC+01:00 (CET)
  - Summer (DST): UTC+02:00 (CEST)
- INSEE/Postal code: 57640 /57320
- ^{1} French Land Register data, which excludes lakes, ponds, glaciers > 1 km^{2} (0.386 sq mi or 247 acres) and river estuaries.

Schwerdorff (French pronunciation: [ʃvɛʁdɔʁf]; German: Schwerdorf) is a commune in the Moselle department in Grand Est in north-eastern France.

== See also ==
- Communes of the Moselle department
