= Dalem, Moselle =

Dalem
- Commune
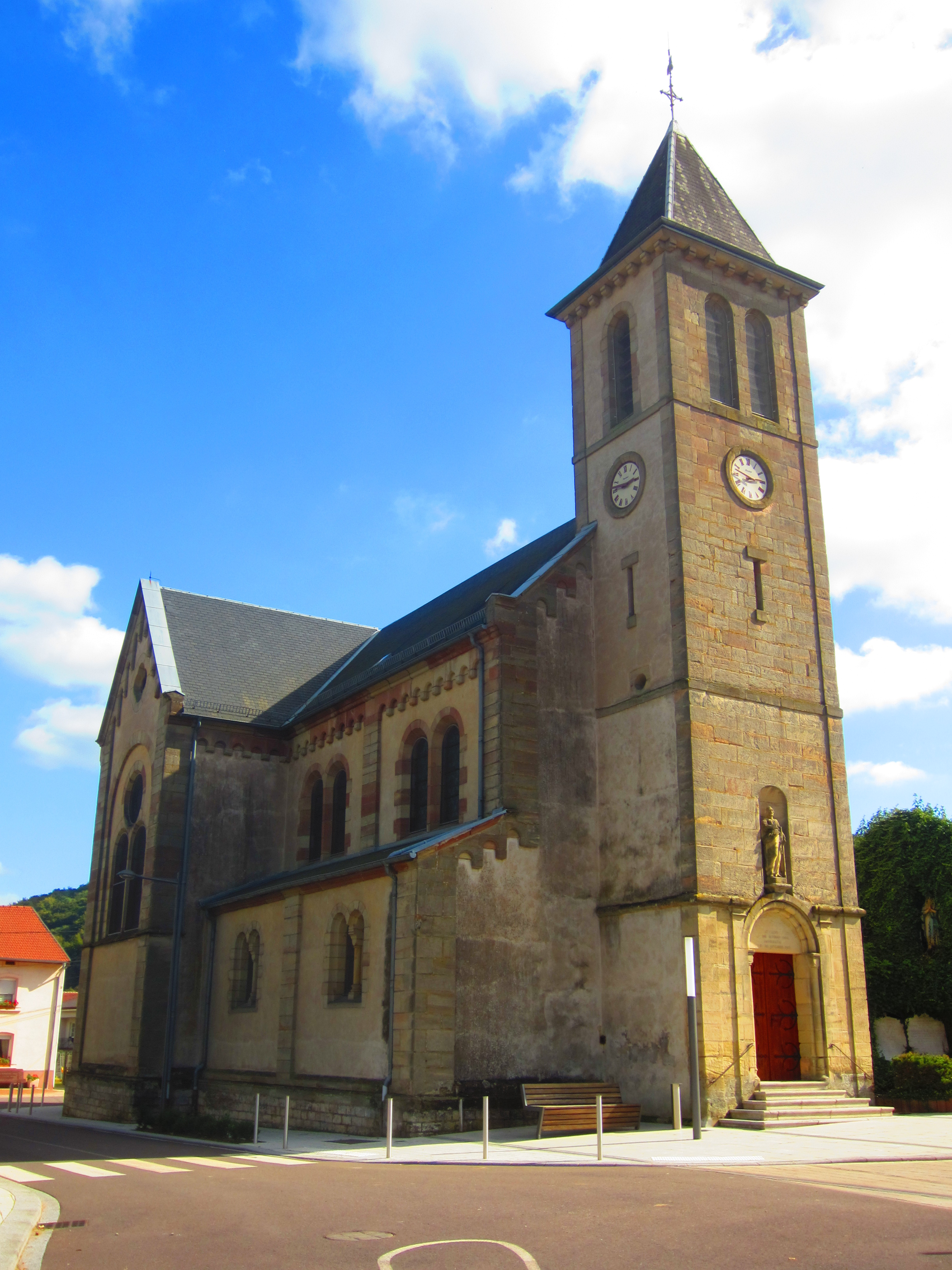
- The church in Dalem

- Coat of arms
- Location of Dalem
- Location within France Location within Grand Est
- Coordinates: 49°14′28″N 6°36′41″E
- Country: France
- Region: Grand Est
- Department: Moselle
- Arrondissement: Forbach-Boulay-Moselle
- Canton: Bouzonville

Government
  - Mayor (2020–2026): Arnaud Enzinger
- Area^{1}: 7.32 km^{2} (2.83 sq mi)
- Elevation: 230 m (750 ft)
- Highest elevation: 355 m (1,165 ft)
- Lowest elevation: 206 m (676 ft)
- Population (2023): 695
  - Density: 94.9/km^{2} (246/sq mi)
- Time zone: UTC+01:00 (CET)
  - Summer (DST): UTC+02:00 (CEST)
- INSEE/Postal code: 57165 /57550
- ^{1} French Land Register data, which excludes lakes, ponds, glaciers > 1 km^{2} (0.386 sq mi or 247 acres) and river estuaries.

Dalem (German: Dalem) is a commune in the Moselle department in Grand Est in north-eastern France.

== See also ==
- Communes of the Moselle department
