= Vaudreching =

- Commune
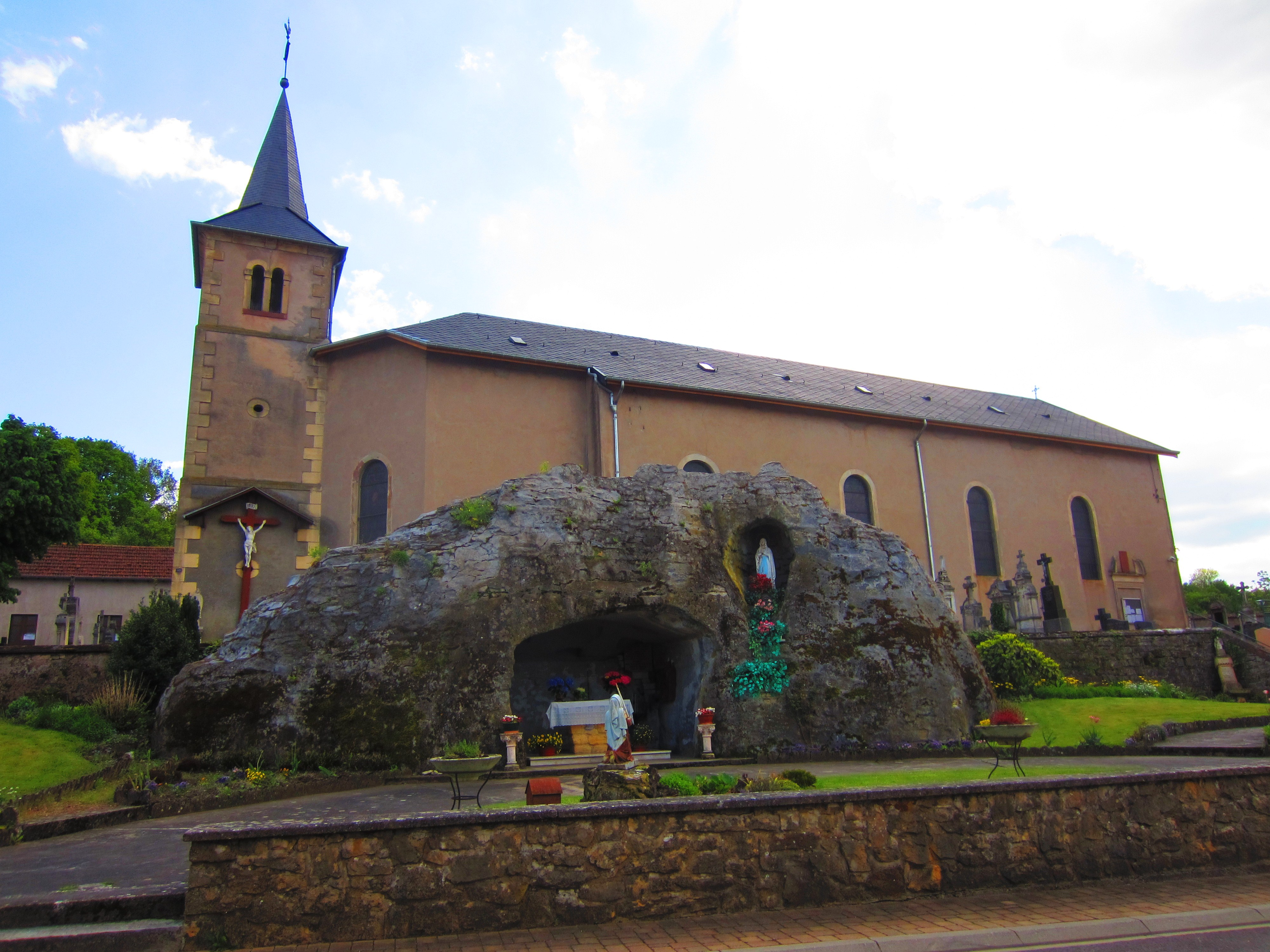
- The church in Vaudreching

- Coat of arms
- Location of Vaudreching
- Location within France Location within Grand Est
- Coordinates: 49°17′06″N 6°31′32″E
- Country: France
- Region: Grand Est
- Department: Moselle
- Arrondissement: Forbach-Boulay-Moselle
- Canton: Bouzonville
- Intercommunality: Bouzonvillois - Trois Frontières

Government
  - Mayor (2020–2026): Christian Clement
- Area^{1}: 4.69 km^{2} (1.81 sq mi)
- Elevation: 192 m (630 ft)
- Highest elevation: 283 m (928 ft)
- Lowest elevation: 195 m (640 ft)
- Population (2023): 499
  - Density: 106/km^{2} (276/sq mi)
- Time zone: UTC+01:00 (CET)
  - Summer (DST): UTC+02:00 (CEST)
- INSEE/Postal code: 57700 /57320
- ^{1} French Land Register data, which excludes lakes, ponds, glaciers > 1 km^{2} (0.386 sq mi or 247 acres) and river estuaries.

Vaudreching (French pronunciation: [vodʁəʃɛ̃]; German: Wallerchen) is a commune in the Moselle department in Grand Est in north-eastern France.

== See also ==
- Communes of the Moselle department
