= Rustroff =

- Commune
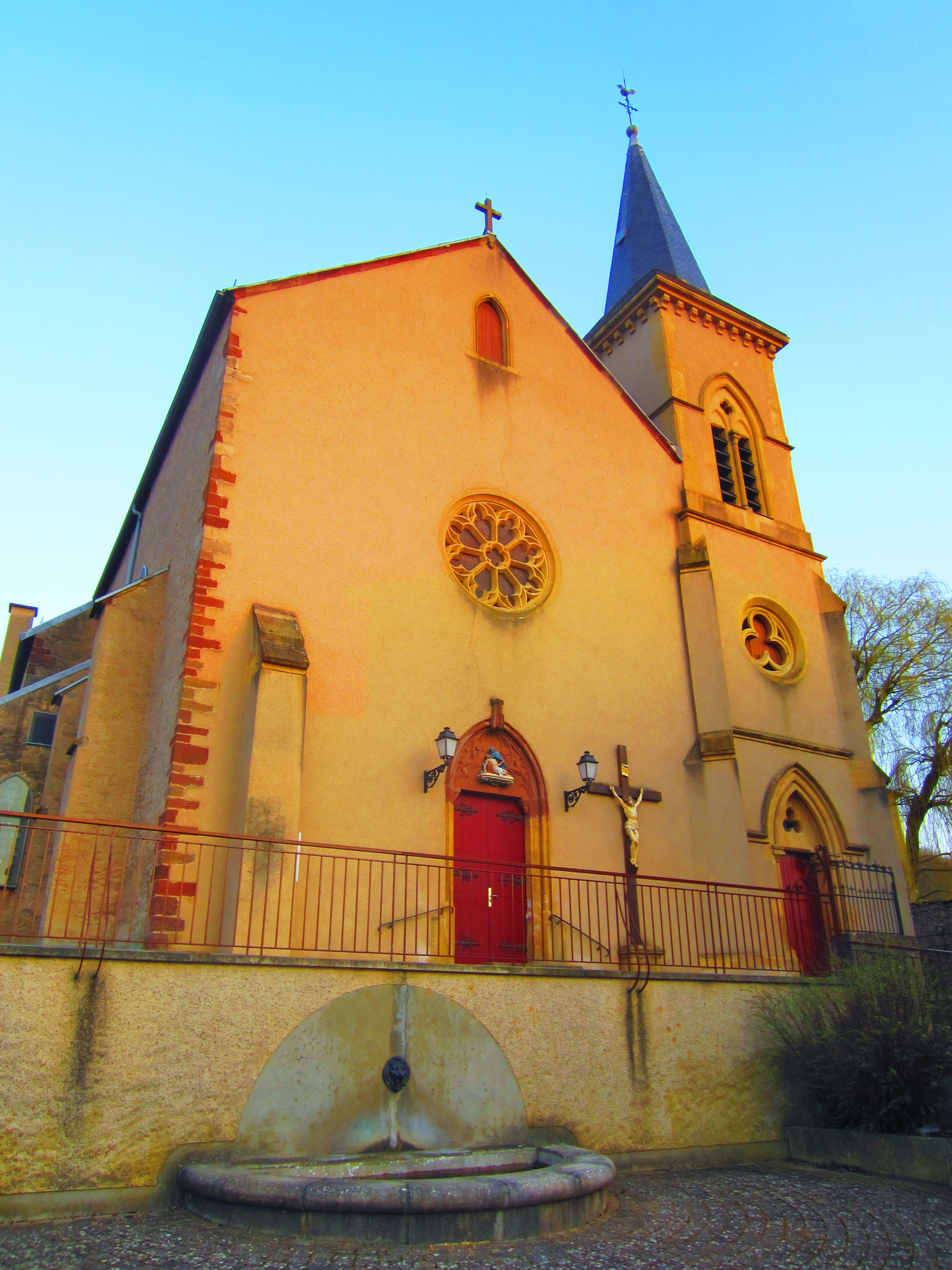
- The church in Rustroff

- Coat of arms
- Location of Rustroff
- Location within France Location within Grand Est
- Coordinates: 49°26′38″N 6°22′23″E
- Country: France
- Region: Grand Est
- Department: Moselle
- Arrondissement: Thionville
- Canton: Bouzonville
- Intercommunality: Bouzonvillois-Trois Frontières

Government
  - Mayor (2020–2026): Jérôme Develle
- Area^{1}: 3.23 km^{2} (1.25 sq mi)
- Elevation: 300 m (980 ft)
- Highest elevation: 358 m (1,175 ft)
- Lowest elevation: 147 m (482 ft)
- Population (2023): 641
  - Density: 198/km^{2} (514/sq mi)
- Time zone: UTC+01:00 (CET)
  - Summer (DST): UTC+02:00 (CEST)
- INSEE/Postal code: 57604 /57480
- ^{1} French Land Register data, which excludes lakes, ponds, glaciers > 1 km^{2} (0.386 sq mi or 247 acres) and river estuaries.

Rustroff (French pronunciation: [ʁystʁɔf]; German: Rüsdorf) is a commune in the Moselle department in Grand Est in north-eastern France.

== See also ==
- Communes of the Moselle department
