= Contz-les-Bains =

- Commune
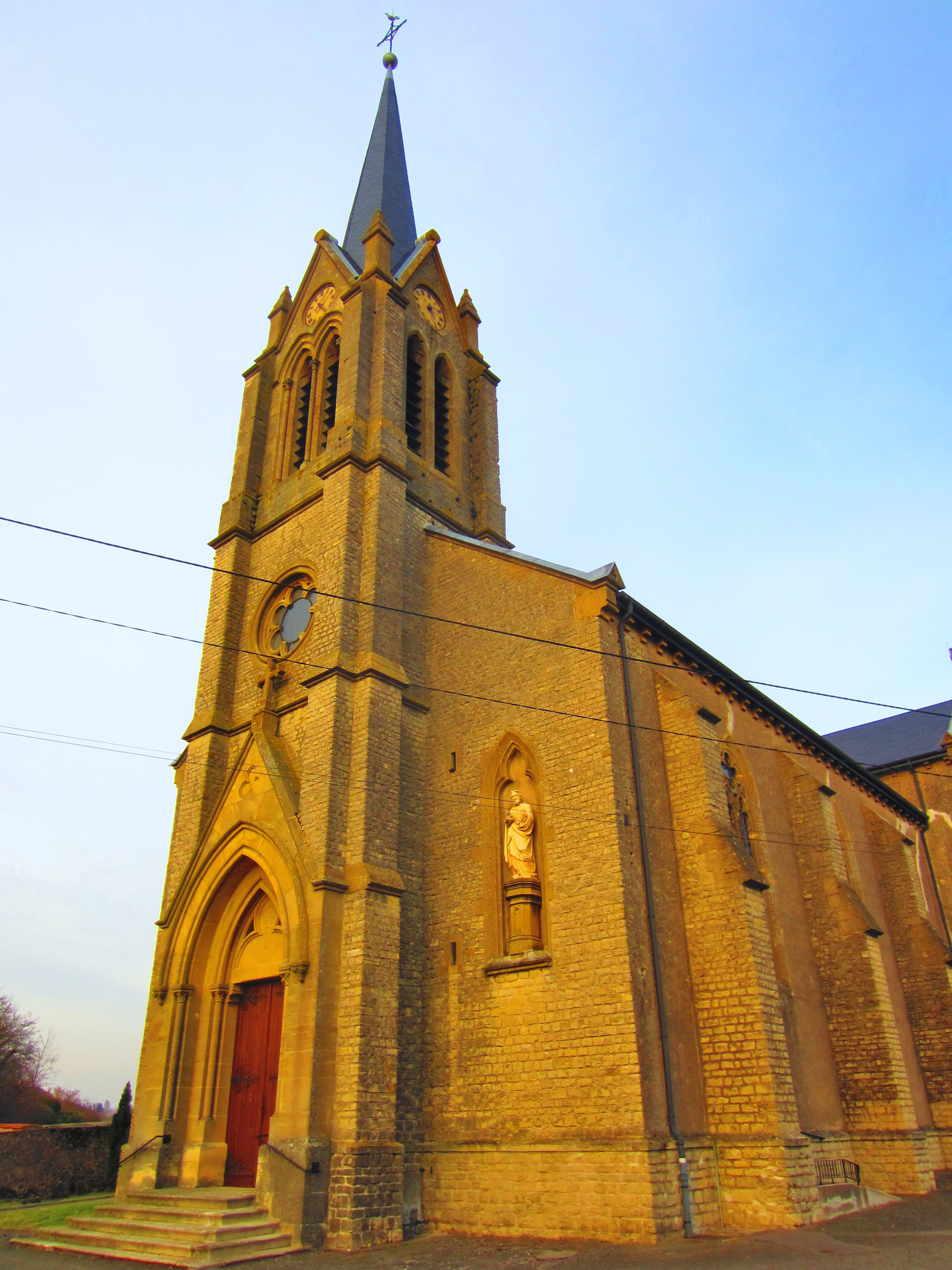
- The church in Contz-les-Bains

- Coat of arms
- Location of Contz-les-Bains
- Location within France Location within Grand Est
- Coordinates: 49°27′10″N 6°20′50″E
- Country: France
- Region: Grand Est
- Department: Moselle
- Arrondissement: Thionville
- Canton: Bouzonville
- Intercommunality: Bouzonvillois-Trois Frontières

Government
  - Mayor (2020–2026): Yves Licht
- Area^{1}: 3.19 km^{2} (1.23 sq mi)
- Elevation: 212 m (696 ft)
- Highest elevation: 314 m (1,030 ft)
- Lowest elevation: 146 m (479 ft)
- Population (2023): 548
  - Density: 172/km^{2} (445/sq mi)
- Time zone: UTC+01:00 (CET)
  - Summer (DST): UTC+02:00 (CEST)
- INSEE/Postal code: 57152 /57480
- ^{1} French Land Register data, which excludes lakes, ponds, glaciers > 1 km^{2} (0.386 sq mi or 247 acres) and river estuaries.

Contz-les-Bains (French pronunciation: [kɔ̃ts le bɛ̃]; Lorraine Franconian: Nidderkonz; German: Niederkontz) is a commune in the Moselle department in Grand Est in north-eastern France.

The commune is located in the Pays de Sierck at the confluence of the Sauer (known in French as the Sûre) and the Moselle, which form the borders with Luxembourg and Germany. Just over the border in Germany is the town of Perl in Saarland, and the neighboring town in Luxembourg is Schengen.

== See also ==
- Communes of the Moselle department
- Haute-Kontz
- Sierck-les-Bains
