= Malling, Moselle =

Malling
- Commune
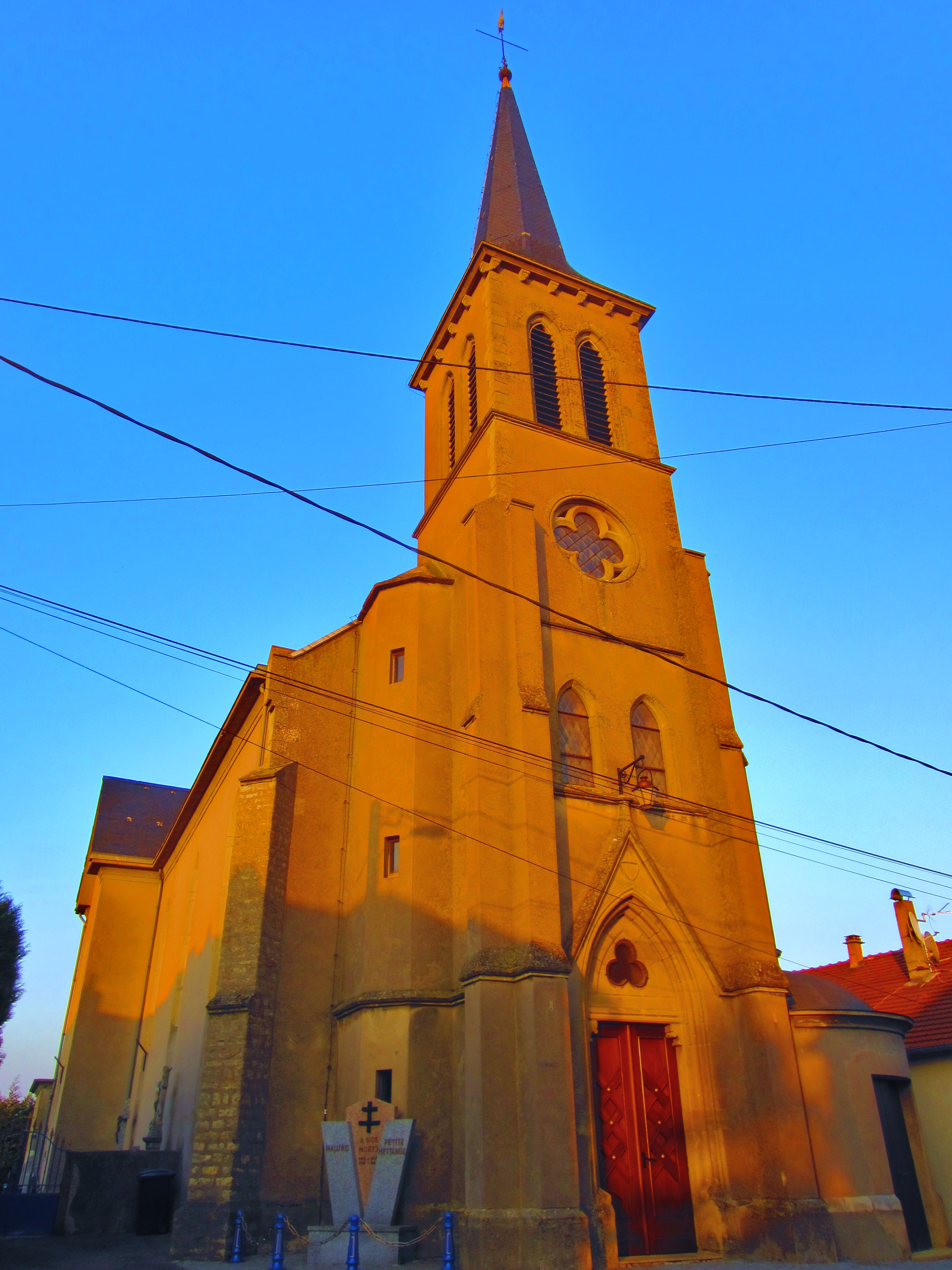
- The church in Malling

- Coat of arms
- Location of Malling
- Location within France Location within Grand Est
- Coordinates: 49°25′25″N 6°17′50″E
- Country: France
- Region: Grand Est
- Department: Moselle
- Arrondissement: Thionville
- Canton: Bouzonville
- Intercommunality: CC de l'Arc Mosellan

Government
  - Mayor (2020–2026): Marie-Rose Luzerne
- Area^{1}: 4.42 km^{2} (1.71 sq mi)
- Highest elevation: 211 m (692 ft)
- Lowest elevation: 145 m (476 ft)
- Population (2023): 681
  - Density: 154/km^{2} (399/sq mi)
- Time zone: UTC+01:00 (CET)
  - Summer (DST): UTC+02:00 (CEST)
- INSEE/Postal code: 57437 /57480
- ^{1} French Land Register data, which excludes lakes, ponds, glaciers > 1 km^{2} (0.386 sq mi or 247 acres) and river estuaries.

Malling (French pronunciation: [malɛ̃]; German: Mallingen; Lorraine Franconian: Malléngen/Malléng) is a commune in the Moselle department in Grand Est in north-eastern France.

== See also ==
- Communes of the Moselle department
