= Filstroff =

- Commune
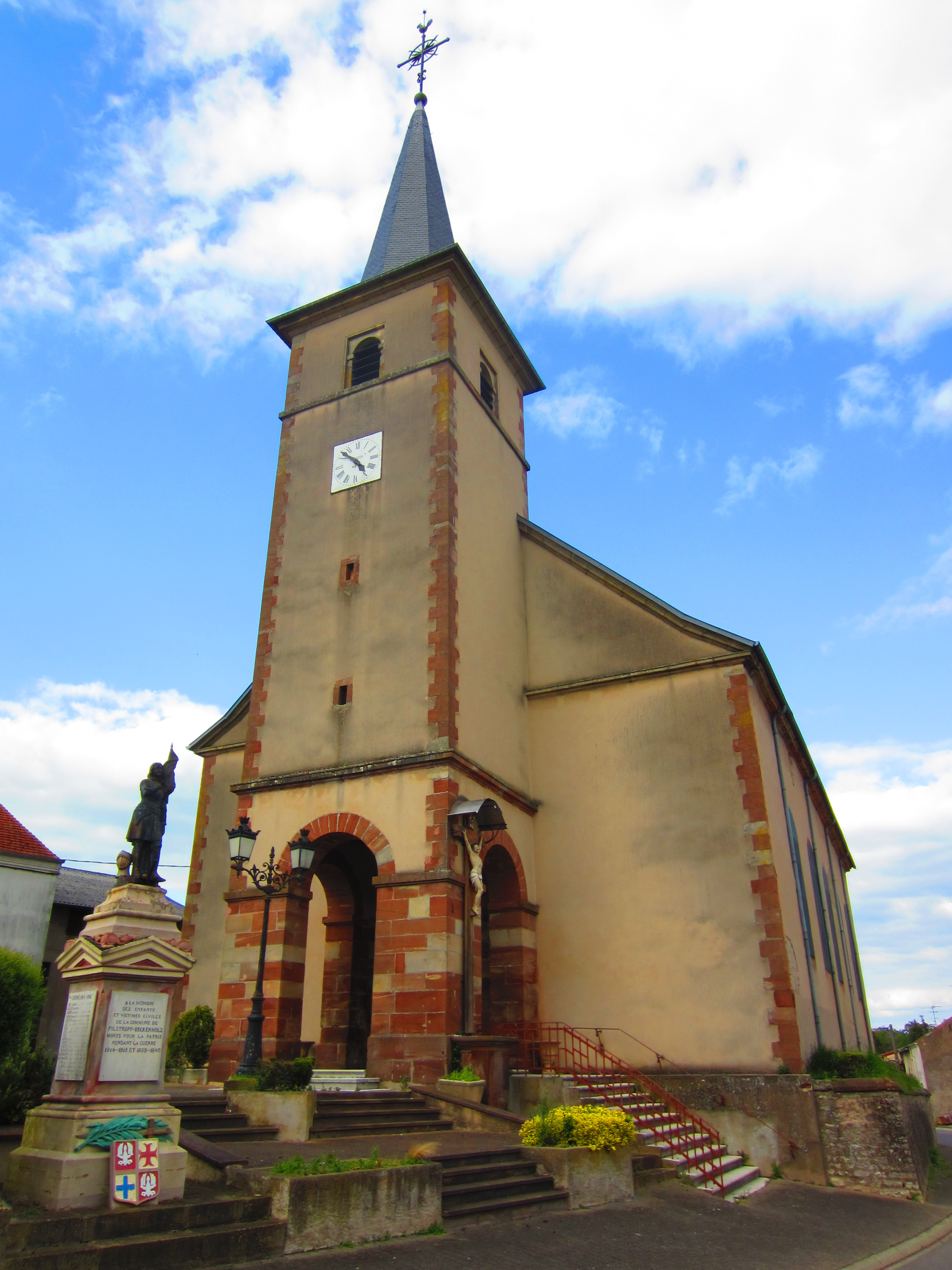
- The church in Filstroff

- Coat of arms
- Location of Filstroff
- Location within France Location within Grand Est
- Coordinates: 49°19′25″N 6°32′29″E
- Country: France
- Region: Grand Est
- Department: Moselle
- Arrondissement: Forbach-Boulay-Moselle
- Canton: Bouzonville
- Intercommunality: Bouzonvillois - Trois Frontières

Government
  - Mayor (2020–2026): René Kupperschmitt
- Area^{1}: 16.76 km^{2} (6.47 sq mi)
- Elevation: 191 m (627 ft)
- Highest elevation: 276 m (906 ft)
- Lowest elevation: 188 m (617 ft)
- Population (2023): 778
  - Density: 46.4/km^{2} (120/sq mi)
- Time zone: UTC+01:00 (CET)
  - Summer (DST): UTC+02:00 (CEST)
- INSEE/Postal code: 57213 /57320
- ^{1} French Land Register data, which excludes lakes, ponds, glaciers > 1 km^{2} (0.386 sq mi or 247 acres) and river estuaries.

Filstroff (French pronunciation: [filstʁɔf]; German: Filsdorf; Lorraine Franconian: Félschtroff) is a commune in the Moselle department in Grand Est in north-eastern France.

Localities of the commune: Bibischerbach, Beckerholz.

== See also ==
- Communes of the Moselle department
