= Brettnach =

- Commune
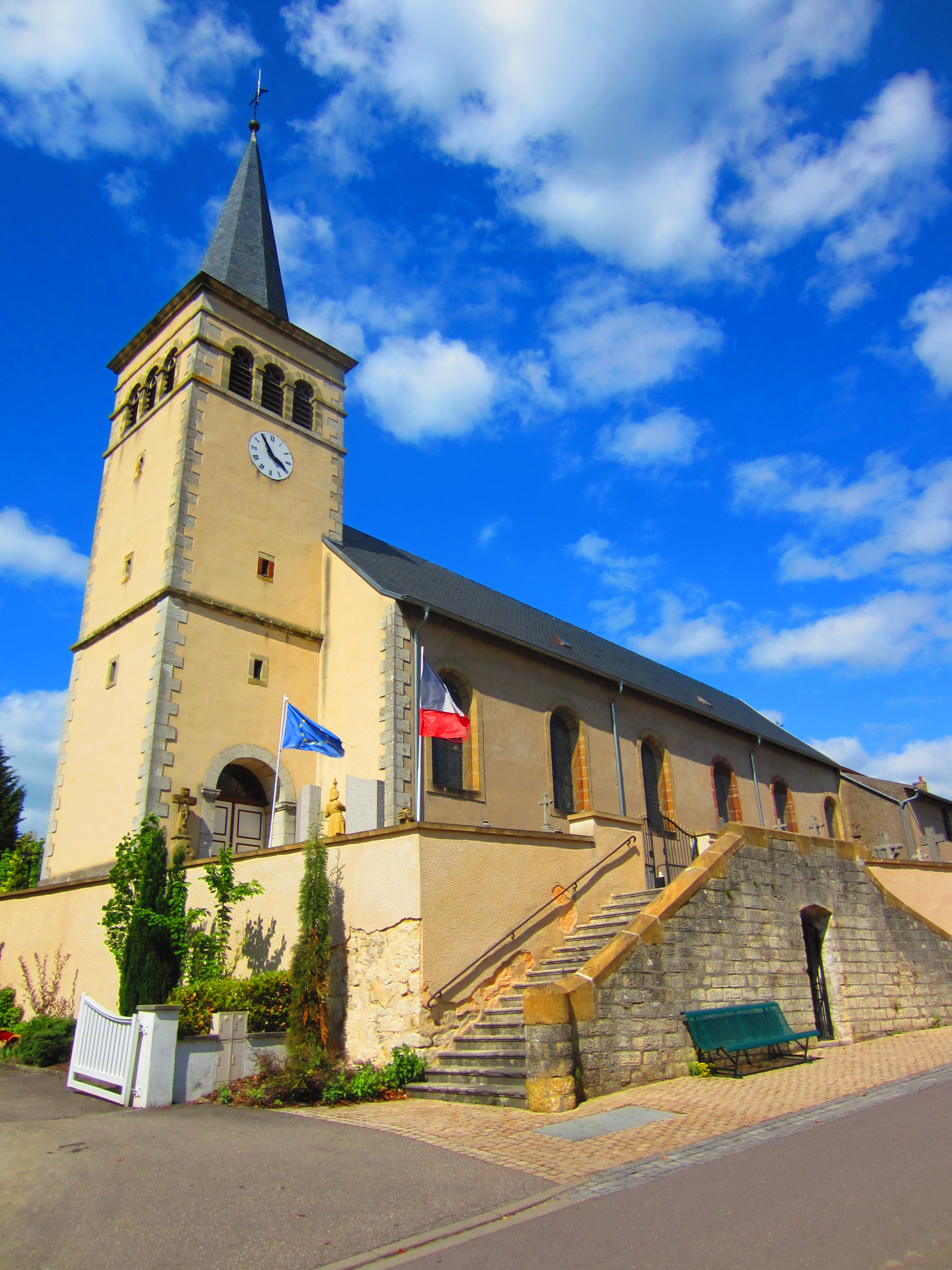
- The church in Brettnach

- Coat of arms
- Location of Brettnach
- Location within France Location within Grand Est
- Coordinates: 49°15′30″N 6°33′47″E
- Country: France
- Region: Grand Est
- Department: Moselle
- Arrondissement: Forbach-Boulay-Moselle
- Canton: Bouzonville
- Intercommunality: Bouzonvillois-Trois Frontières

Government
  - Mayor (2020–2026): Annette Champlon
- Area^{1}: 5.9 km^{2} (2.3 sq mi)
- Elevation: 260 m (850 ft)
- Highest elevation: 335 m (1,099 ft)
- Lowest elevation: 228 m (748 ft)
- Population (2023): 429
  - Density: 73/km^{2} (190/sq mi)
- Time zone: UTC+01:00 (CET)
  - Summer (DST): UTC+02:00 (CEST)
- INSEE/Postal code: 57110 /57320
- ^{1} French Land Register data, which excludes lakes, ponds, glaciers > 1 km^{2} (0.386 sq mi or 247 acres) and river estuaries.

Brettnach (German: Brettnach) is a commune in the Moselle department in Grand Est in northeastern France.

== Population ==
Historical population
Year	Pop.	±% p.a.
1968	396	—
1975	353	−1.63%
1982	363	+0.40%
1990	379	+0.54%
1999	362	−0.51%
2007	396	+1.13%
2012	465	+3.26%
2017	441	−1.05%
2023	429	−0.46%
Source: INSEE

== See also ==
- Communes of the Moselle department
