= Launstroff =

Launstroff Launschtroff
- Commune
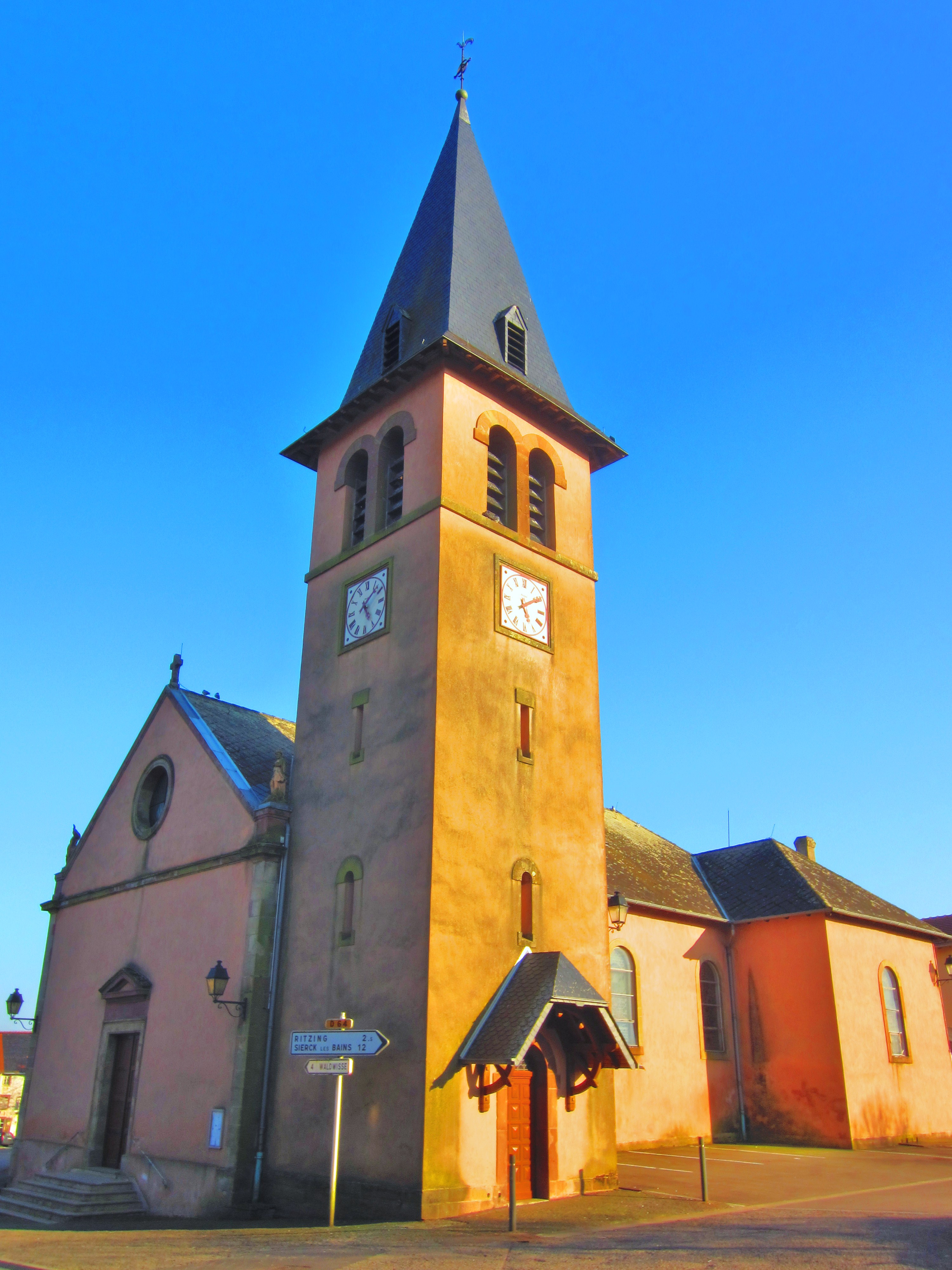
- The church in Launstroff

- Coat of arms
- Location of Launstroff
- Location within France Location within Grand Est
- Coordinates: 49°26′22″N 6°29′51″E
- Country: France
- Region: Grand Est
- Department: Moselle
- Arrondissement: Thionville
- Canton: Bouzonville
- Intercommunality: Bouzonvillois-Trois Frontières

Government
  - Mayor (2020–2026): Christian Schweitzer
- Area^{1}: 7.81 km^{2} (3.02 sq mi)
- Elevation: 350 m (1,150 ft)
- Highest elevation: 407 m (1,335 ft)
- Lowest elevation: 285 m (935 ft)
- Population (2023): 238
  - Density: 30.5/km^{2} (78.9/sq mi)
- Time zone: UTC+01:00 (CET)
  - Summer (DST): UTC+02:00 (CEST)
- INSEE/Postal code: 57388 /57480
- ^{1} French Land Register data, which excludes lakes, ponds, glaciers > 1 km^{2} (0.386 sq mi or 247 acres) and river estuaries.

Launstroff (German: Launsdorf) is a commune in the Moselle department in Grand Est in north-eastern France.

Launstroff is a small agricultural community consisting of 50-60 houses, with few exceptions over fifty years old.

== Geography ==
Launstroff is located 1.5 km from the German border.

== History ==
In the village square, next to the church, is a war memorial to those who gave their lives in the World War I and World War II. During World War II, there are records of US troops being in the village, which is located almost on the Siegfried Line.

== Sights ==
Many large stone sculptures can be found in the area. Just outside the village, running along the international border, many smaller carved stones can be found marking the border as it has changed over the last 250 years.

== Economy ==
The economy is based on agriculture. There are no shops, restaurants, or hotels in the village.

== Transportation ==
The village has a bus service linking it to nearby communities. There is no link by public transport into Germany and no rail link. The village is surrounded by pathways and lies on several cycle routes.

== See also ==
- Communes of the Moselle department
