= Rémering =

- Commune
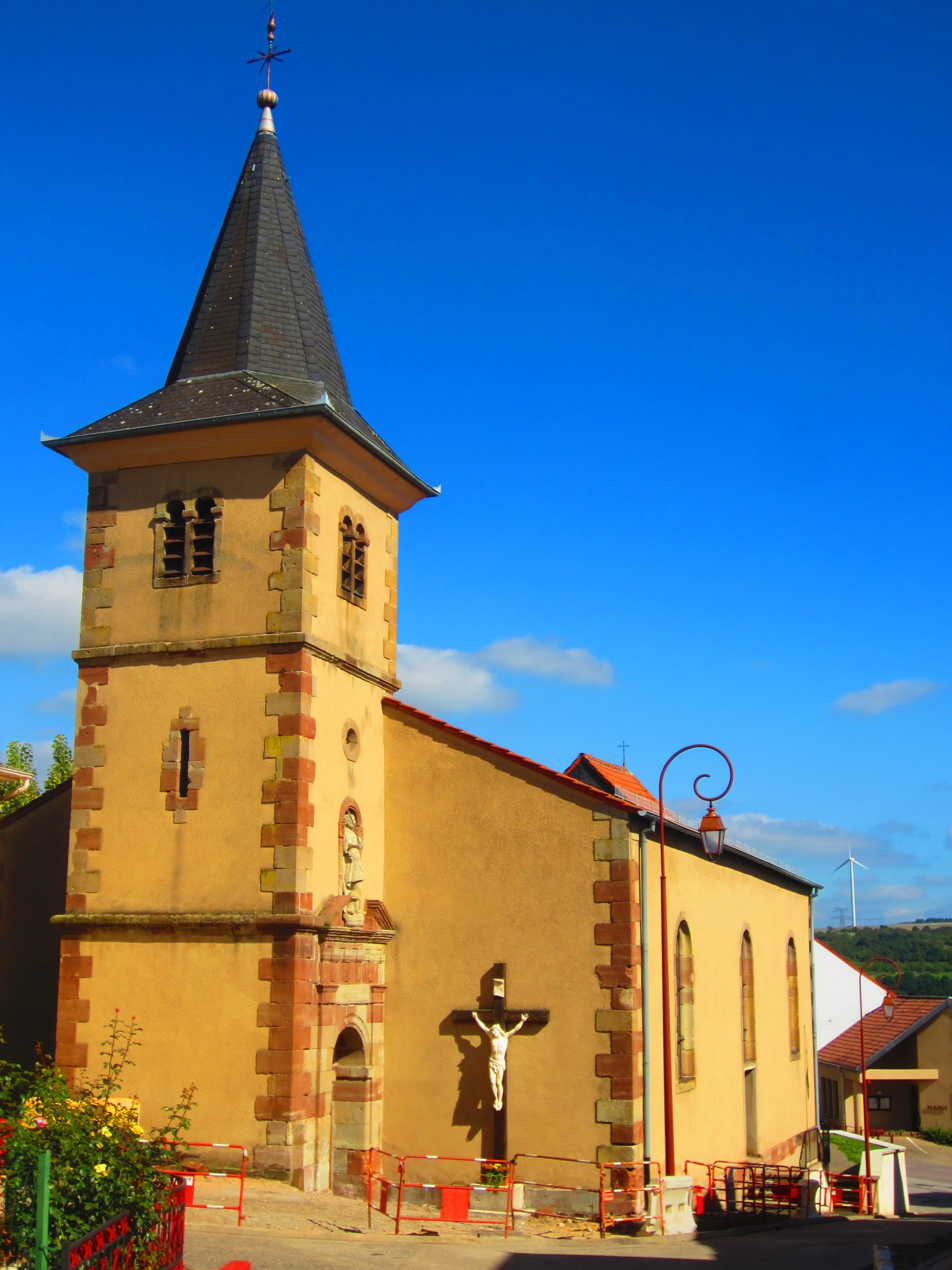
- The church in Rémering

- Coat of arms
- Location of Rémering
- Location within France Location within Grand Est
- Coordinates: 49°15′55″N 6°37′46″E
- Country: France
- Region: Grand Est
- Department: Moselle
- Arrondissement: Forbach-Boulay-Moselle
- Canton: Bouzonville
- Intercommunality: CC Houve-Pays Boulageois

Government
  - Mayor (2020–2026): Adrien Edy Scherer
- Area^{1}: 4.94 km^{2} (1.91 sq mi)
- Elevation: 250 m (820 ft)
- Highest elevation: 377 m (1,237 ft)
- Lowest elevation: 217 m (712 ft)
- Population (2023): 421
  - Density: 85.2/km^{2} (221/sq mi)
- Time zone: UTC+01:00 (CET)
  - Summer (DST): UTC+02:00 (CEST)
- INSEE/Postal code: 57570 /57550
- ^{1} French Land Register data, which excludes lakes, ponds, glaciers > 1 km^{2} (0.386 sq mi or 247 acres) and river estuaries.

Rémering (German: Reimeringen, before 1993: Rémering-lès-Hargarten) is a commune in the Moselle department in Grand Est in north-eastern France.

== See also ==
- Communes of the Moselle department
