= Hunting, Moselle =

Hunting
- Commune
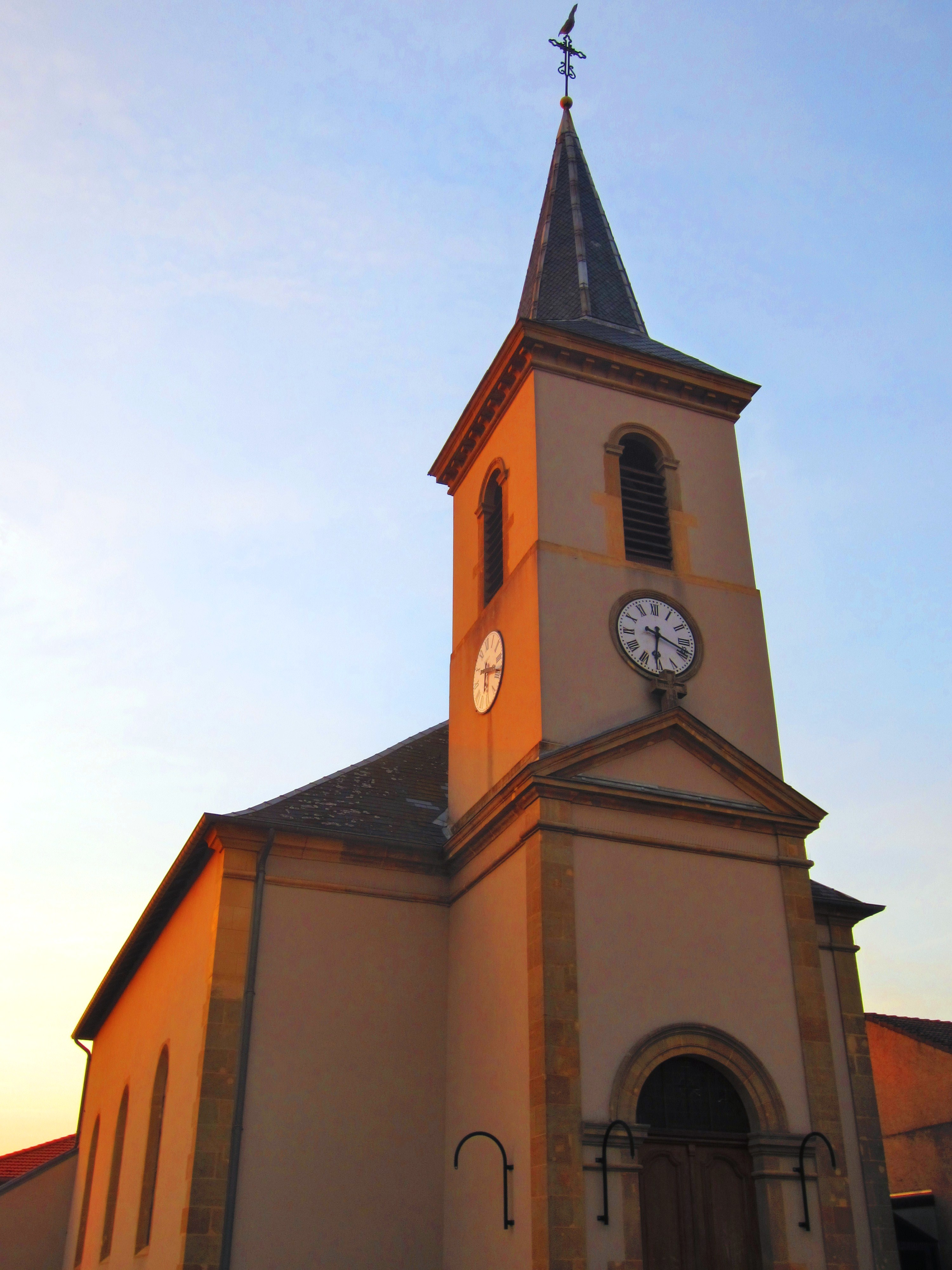
- The church in Hunting

- Coat of arms
- Location of Hunting
- Location within France Location within Grand Est
- Coordinates: 49°24′53″N 6°19′40″E
- Country: France
- Region: Grand Est
- Department: Moselle
- Arrondissement: Thionville
- Canton: Bouzonville
- Intercommunality: Bouzonvillois-Trois Frontières

Government
  - Mayor (2020–2026): Norbert Marck
- Area^{1}: 3.78 km^{2} (1.46 sq mi)
- Elevation: 308 m (1,010 ft)
- Highest elevation: 267 m (876 ft)
- Lowest elevation: 160 m (520 ft)
- Population (2023): 673
  - Density: 178/km^{2} (461/sq mi)
- Time zone: UTC+01:00 (CET)
  - Summer (DST): UTC+02:00 (CEST)
- INSEE/Postal code: 57341 /57480
- ^{1} French Land Register data, which excludes lakes, ponds, glaciers > 1 km^{2} (0.386 sq mi or 247 acres) and river estuaries.

Hunting (French pronunciation: [œ̃tɛ̃]; German: Hüntingen; Lorraine Franconian: Hënténgen/Hënténg) is a commune in the Moselle department in Grand Est in north-eastern France.

== Population ==
Historical population
Year	Pop.	±% p.a.
1968	278	—
1975	288	+0.51%
1982	474	+7.38%
1990	580	+2.55%
1999	566	−0.27%
2007	581	+0.33%
2012	697	+3.71%
2017	721	+0.68%
2023	673	−1.14%
Source: INSEE

== See also ==
- Communes of the Moselle department
