= Holling, Moselle =

Holling
- Commune
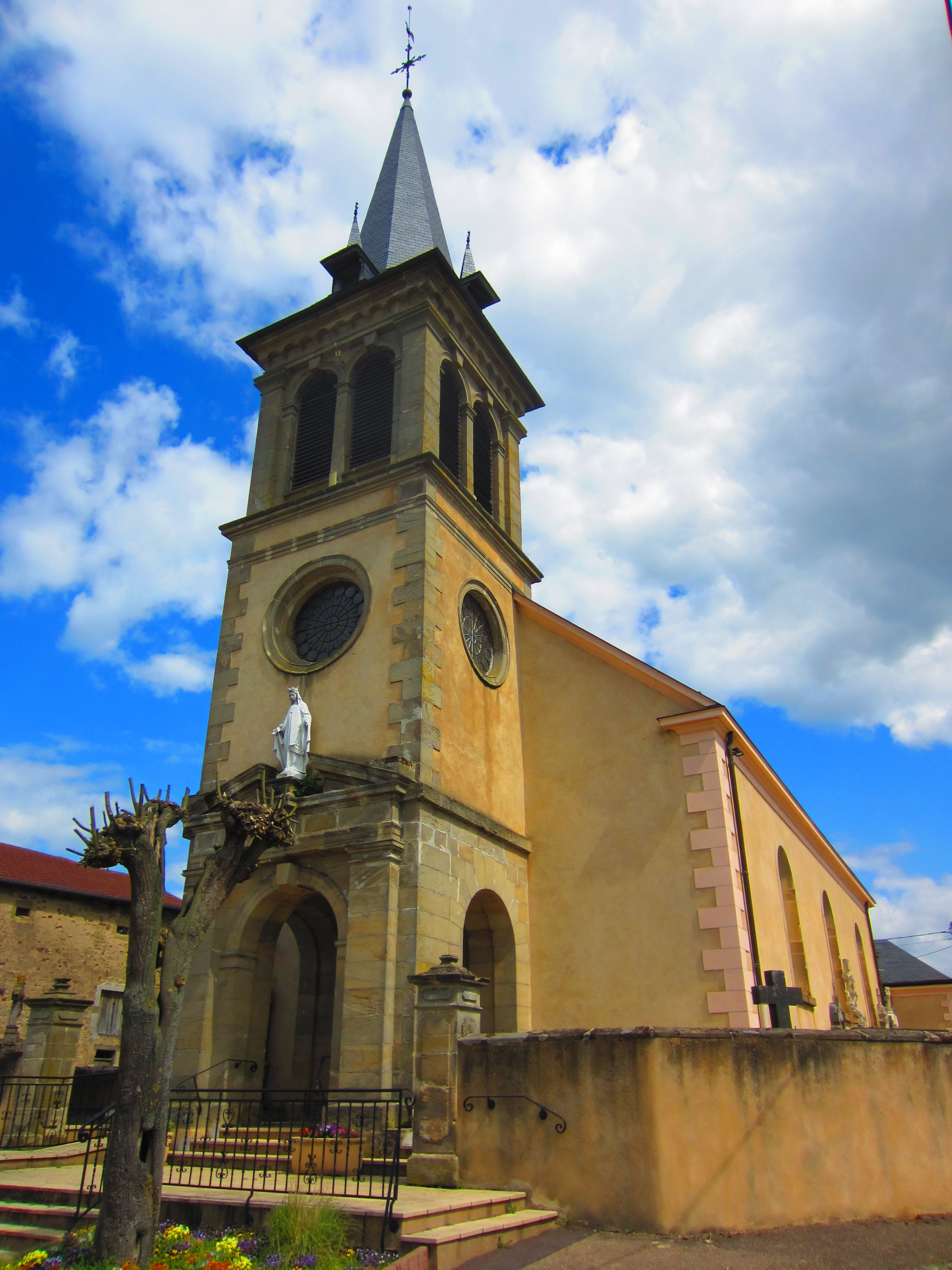
- Saint-Hubert church.

- Coat of arms
- Location of Holling
- Location within France Location within Grand Est
- Coordinates: 49°15′45″N 6°29′50″E
- Country: France
- Region: Grand Est
- Department: Moselle
- Arrondissement: Forbach-Boulay-Moselle
- Canton: Bouzonville
- Intercommunality: Bouzonvillois - Trois Frontières

Government
  - Mayor (2021–2026): Marc-Olivier Borsi
- Area^{1}: 4.86 km^{2} (1.88 sq mi)
- Elevation: 200 m (660 ft)
- Highest elevation: 296 m (971 ft)
- Lowest elevation: 196 m (643 ft)
- Population (2023): 444
  - Density: 91.4/km^{2} (237/sq mi)
- Time zone: UTC+01:00 (CET)
  - Summer (DST): UTC+02:00 (CEST)
- INSEE/Postal code: 57329 /57220
- ^{1} French Land Register data, which excludes lakes, ponds, glaciers > 1 km^{2} (0.386 sq mi or 247 acres) and river estuaries.

Holling (French pronunciation: [ɔlɛ̃]; German: Hollingen; Lorraine Franconian: Holléngen) is a commune in the Moselle department in Grand Est in north-eastern France.

== See also ==
- Communes of the Moselle department
