= Rettel =

- Commune
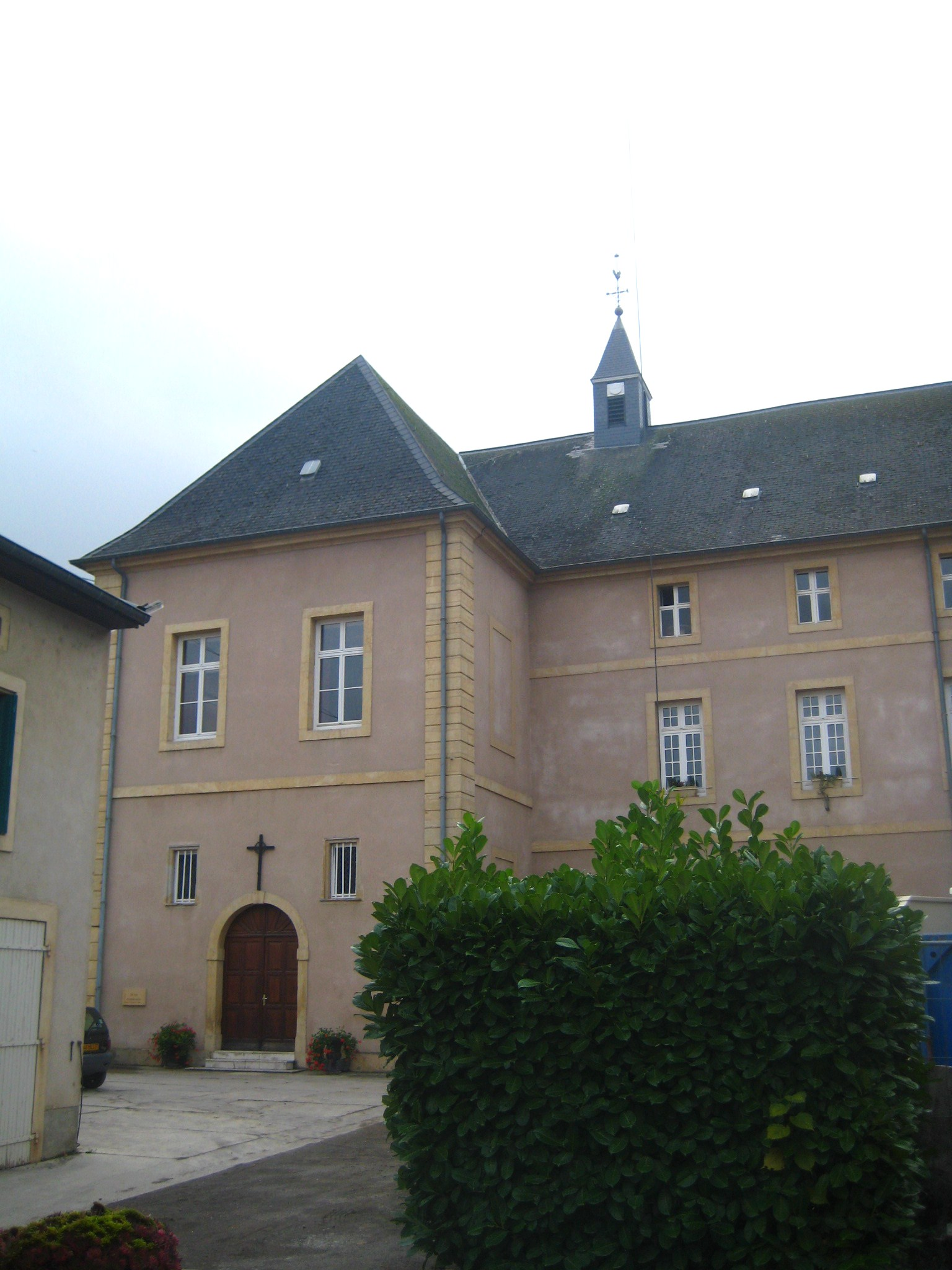
- The abbey in Rettel

- Coat of arms
- Location of Rettel
- Location within France Location within Grand Est
- Coordinates: 49°26′37″N 6°19′43″E
- Country: France
- Region: Grand Est
- Department: Moselle
- Arrondissement: Thionville
- Canton: Bouzonville
- Intercommunality: Bouzonvillois-Trois Frontières

Government
  - Mayor (2020–2026): Rémi Schwenck
- Area^{1}: 6.89 km^{2} (2.66 sq mi)
- Elevation: 150 m (490 ft)
- Highest elevation: 300 m (980 ft)
- Lowest elevation: 145 m (476 ft)
- Population (2023): 869
  - Density: 126/km^{2} (327/sq mi)
- Time zone: UTC+01:00 (CET)
  - Summer (DST): UTC+02:00 (CEST)
- INSEE/Postal code: 57576 /57480
- ^{1} French Land Register data, which excludes lakes, ponds, glaciers > 1 km^{2} (0.386 sq mi or 247 acres) and river estuaries.

Rettel (French pronunciation: [ʁɛtɛl]) is a commune in the Moselle department in Grand Est in north-eastern France.

== Population ==
Historical population
Year	Pop.	±% p.a.
1968	591	—
1975	583	−0.19%
1982	566	−0.42%
1990	634	+1.43%
1999	684	+0.85%
2007	748	+1.12%
2012	727	−0.57%
2017	764	+1.00%
2023	869	+2.17%
Source: INSEE

== See also ==
- Communes of the Moselle department
