= Hestroff =

- Commune
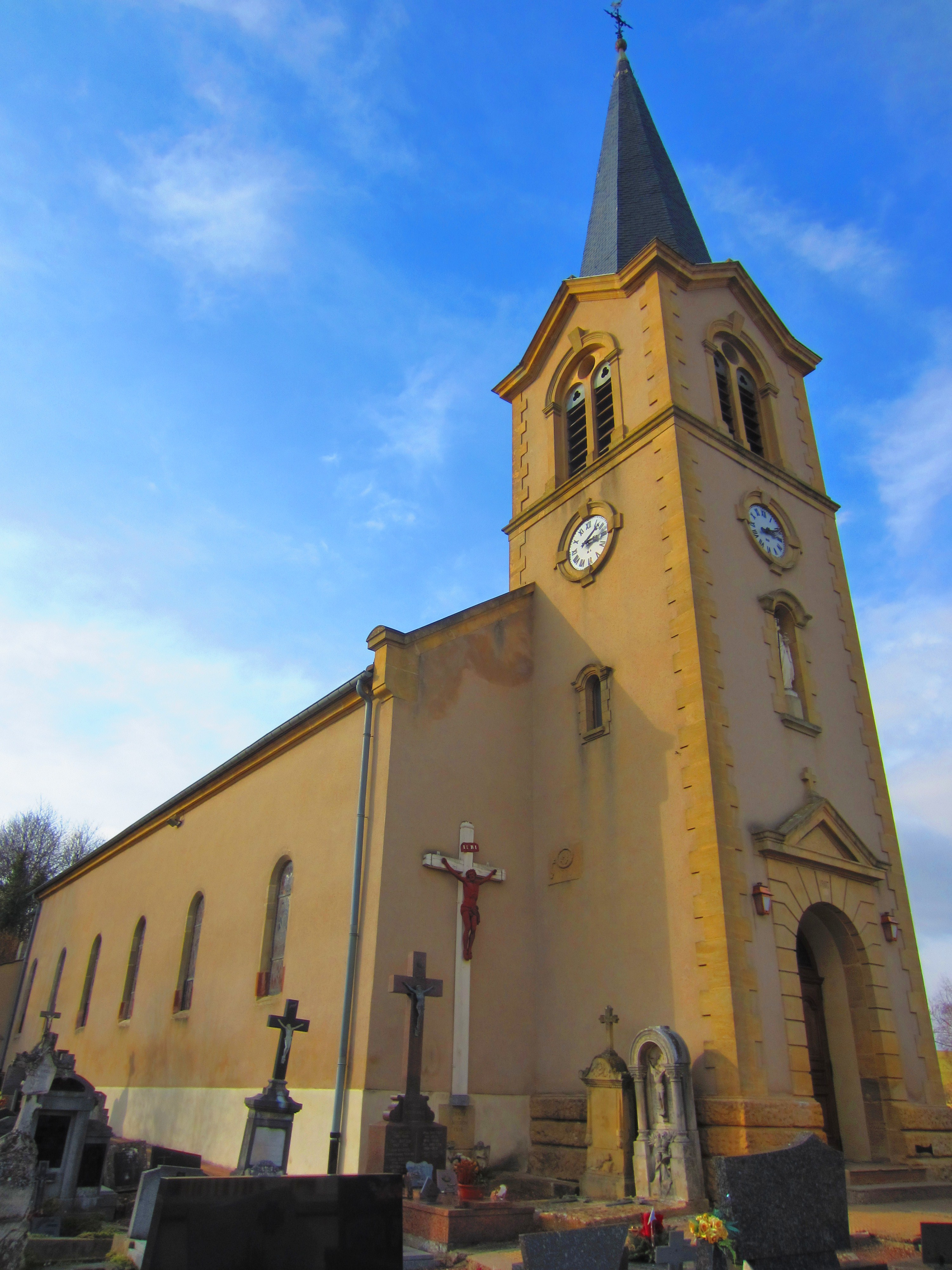
- The church in Hestroff

- Coat of arms
- Location of Hestroff
- Location within France Location within Grand Est
- Coordinates: 49°15′47″N 6°26′08″E
- Country: France
- Region: Grand Est
- Department: Moselle
- Arrondissement: Forbach-Boulay-Moselle
- Canton: Bouzonville
- Intercommunality: Bouzonvillois - Trois Frontières

Government
  - Mayor (2020–2026): Pierre Lounissi
- Area^{1}: 7.43 km^{2} (2.87 sq mi)
- Elevation: 210 m (690 ft)
- Highest elevation: 318 m (1,043 ft)
- Lowest elevation: 205 m (673 ft)
- Population (2023): 482
  - Density: 64.9/km^{2} (168/sq mi)
- Time zone: UTC+01:00 (CET)
  - Summer (DST): UTC+02:00 (CEST)
- INSEE/Postal code: 57322 /57320
- ^{1} French Land Register data, which excludes lakes, ponds, glaciers > 1 km^{2} (0.386 sq mi or 247 acres) and river estuaries.

Hestroff (French pronunciation: [ɛstʁɔf]; German: Hessdorf; Lorraine Franconian: Heschtroff) is a commune in the Moselle department in Grand Est in north-eastern France.

Localities of the commune: Bousse, Dordatz, Geismühl.

== See also ==
- Communes of the Moselle department
