= Colmen =

- Commune
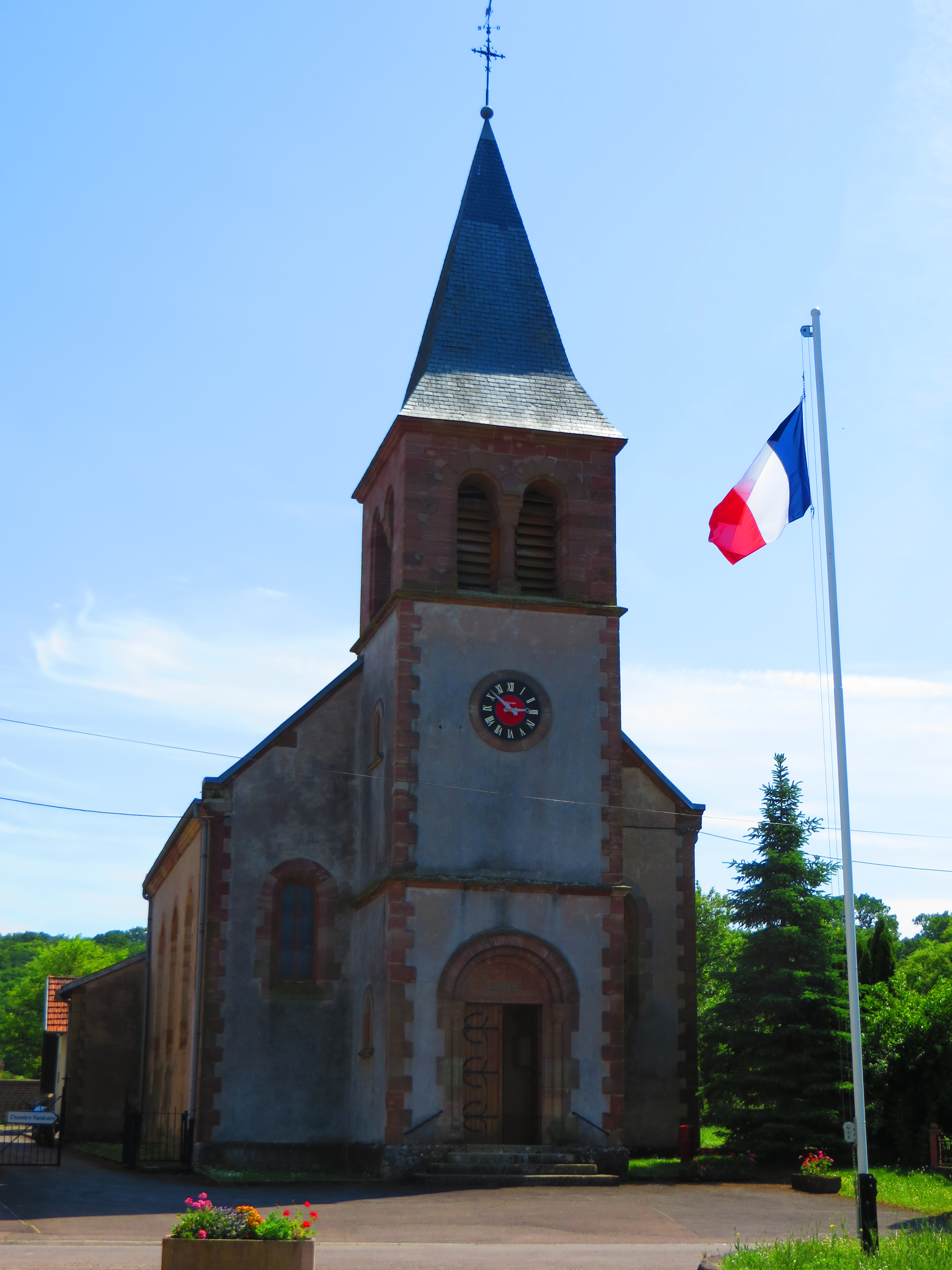
- The church in Colmen

- Coat of arms
- Location of Colmen
- Location within France Location within Grand Est
- Coordinates: 49°21′22″N 6°32′34″E
- Country: France
- Region: Grand Est
- Department: Moselle
- Arrondissement: Forbach-Boulay-Moselle
- Canton: Bouzonville
- Intercommunality: Bouzonvillois - Trois Frontières

Government
  - Mayor (2020–2026): Jean-Paul Dor
- Area^{1}: 4.82 km^{2} (1.86 sq mi)
- Elevation: 234 m (768 ft)
- Highest elevation: 267 m (876 ft)
- Lowest elevation: 208 m (682 ft)
- Population (2023): 207
  - Density: 42.9/km^{2} (111/sq mi)
- Time zone: UTC+01:00 (CET)
  - Summer (DST): UTC+02:00 (CEST)
- INSEE/Postal code: 57149 /57320
- ^{1} French Land Register data, which excludes lakes, ponds, glaciers > 1 km^{2} (0.386 sq mi or 247 acres) and river estuaries.

Colmen (French pronunciation: [kɔlmən]; German: Kolmen) is a commune in the Moselle department in Grand Est in north-eastern France.

== See also ==
- Communes of the Moselle department
