= Kirsch-lès-Sierck =

- Commune
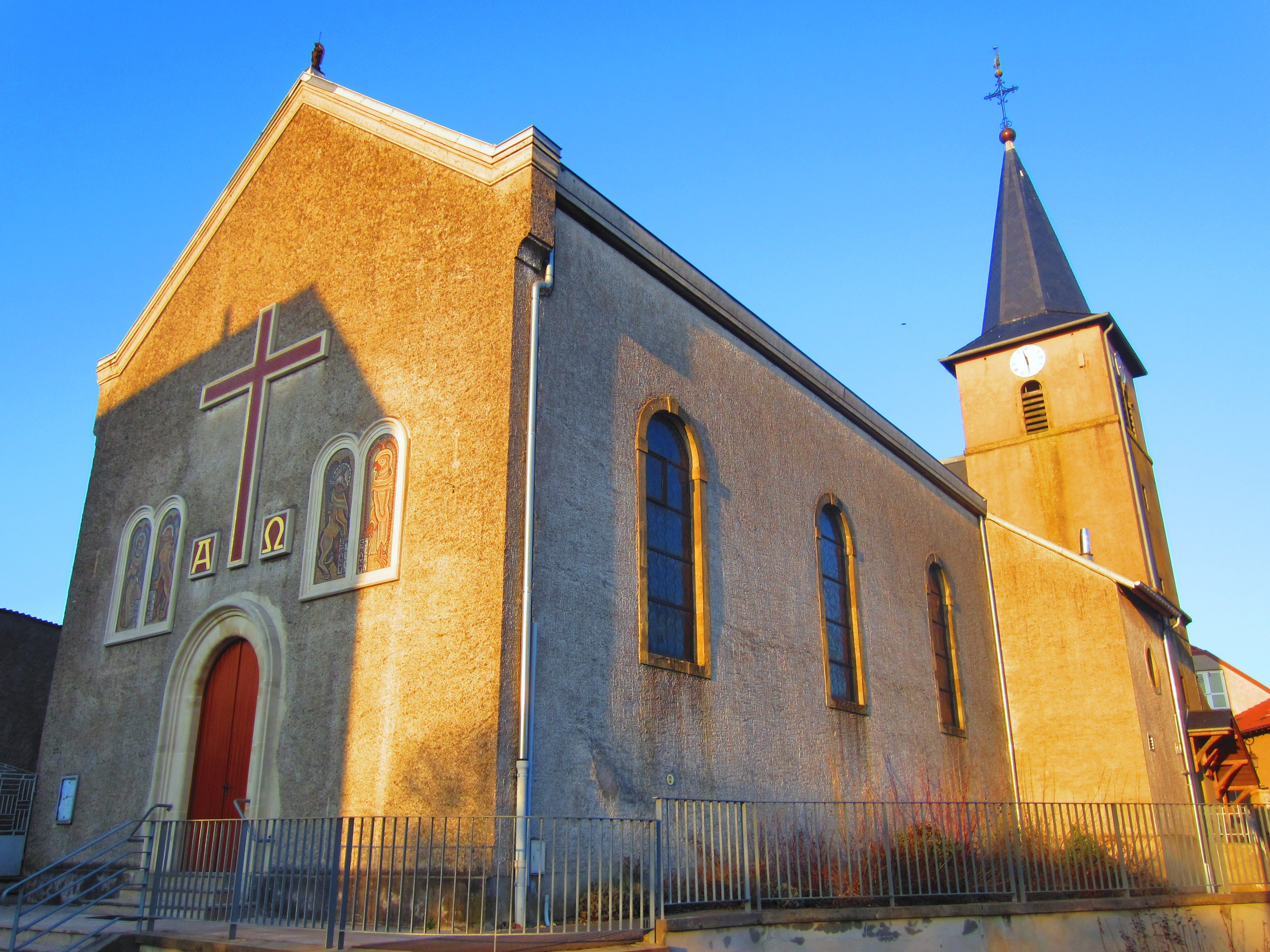
- The church in Kirsch-lès-Sierck

- Coat of arms
- Location of Kirsch-lès-Sierck
- Location within France Location within Grand Est
- Coordinates: 49°26′38″N 6°24′03″E
- Country: France
- Region: Grand Est
- Department: Moselle
- Arrondissement: Thionville
- Canton: Bouzonville
- Intercommunality: Bouzonvillois-Trois Frontières

Government
  - Mayor (2020–2026): Roland Kohn
- Area^{1}: 8.85 km^{2} (3.42 sq mi)
- Elevation: 370 m (1,210 ft)
- Highest elevation: 372 m (1,220 ft)
- Lowest elevation: 274 m (899 ft)
- Population (2023): 328
  - Density: 37.1/km^{2} (96.0/sq mi)
- Time zone: UTC+01:00 (CET)
  - Summer (DST): UTC+02:00 (CEST)
- INSEE/Postal code: 57364 /57480
- ^{1} French Land Register data, which excludes lakes, ponds, glaciers > 1 km^{2} (0.386 sq mi or 247 acres) and river estuaries.

Kirsch-lès-Sierck (French pronunciation: [kiʁʃ lɛ siʁk], lit. 'Kirsch near Sierck'; German: Kirsch bei Sierck) is a commune in the Moselle department in Grand Est in north-eastern France.

== See also ==
- Communes of the Moselle department
