= Canton of Bouzonville =

Coordinates: 49.29°N 6.54°E

The canton of Bouzonville is an administrative division of the Moselle department, northeastern France. Its borders were modified at the French canton reorganisation which came into effect in March 2015. Its seat is in Bouzonville.

It consists of the following communes:

1. Alzing
2. Anzeling
3. Apach
4. Berviller-en-Moselle
5. Bibiche
6. Bouzonville
7. Brettnach
8. Château-Rouge
9. Chémery-les-Deux
10. Colmen
11. Contz-les-Bains
12. Dalem
13. Dalstein
14. Ébersviller
15. Falck
16. Filstroff
17. Flastroff
18. Freistroff
19. Grindorff-Bizing
20. Guerstling
21. Halstroff
22. Hargarten-aux-Mines
23. Haute-Kontz
24. Heining-lès-Bouzonville
25. Hestroff
26. Holling
27. Hunting
28. Kerling-lès-Sierck
29. Kirsch-lès-Sierck
30. Kirschnaumen
31. Laumesfeld
32. Launstroff
33. Malling
34. Manderen-Ritzing
35. Menskirch
36. Merschweiller
37. Merten
38. Montenach
39. Neunkirchen-lès-Bouzonville
40. Oberdorff
41. Rémelfang
42. Rémeling
43. Rémering
44. Rettel
45. Rustroff
46. Saint-François-Lacroix
47. Schwerdorff
48. Sierck-les-Bains
49. Tromborn
50. Vaudreching
51. Villing
52. Vœlfling-lès-Bouzonville
53. Waldweistroff
54. Waldwisse
