= Menskirch =

- Commune
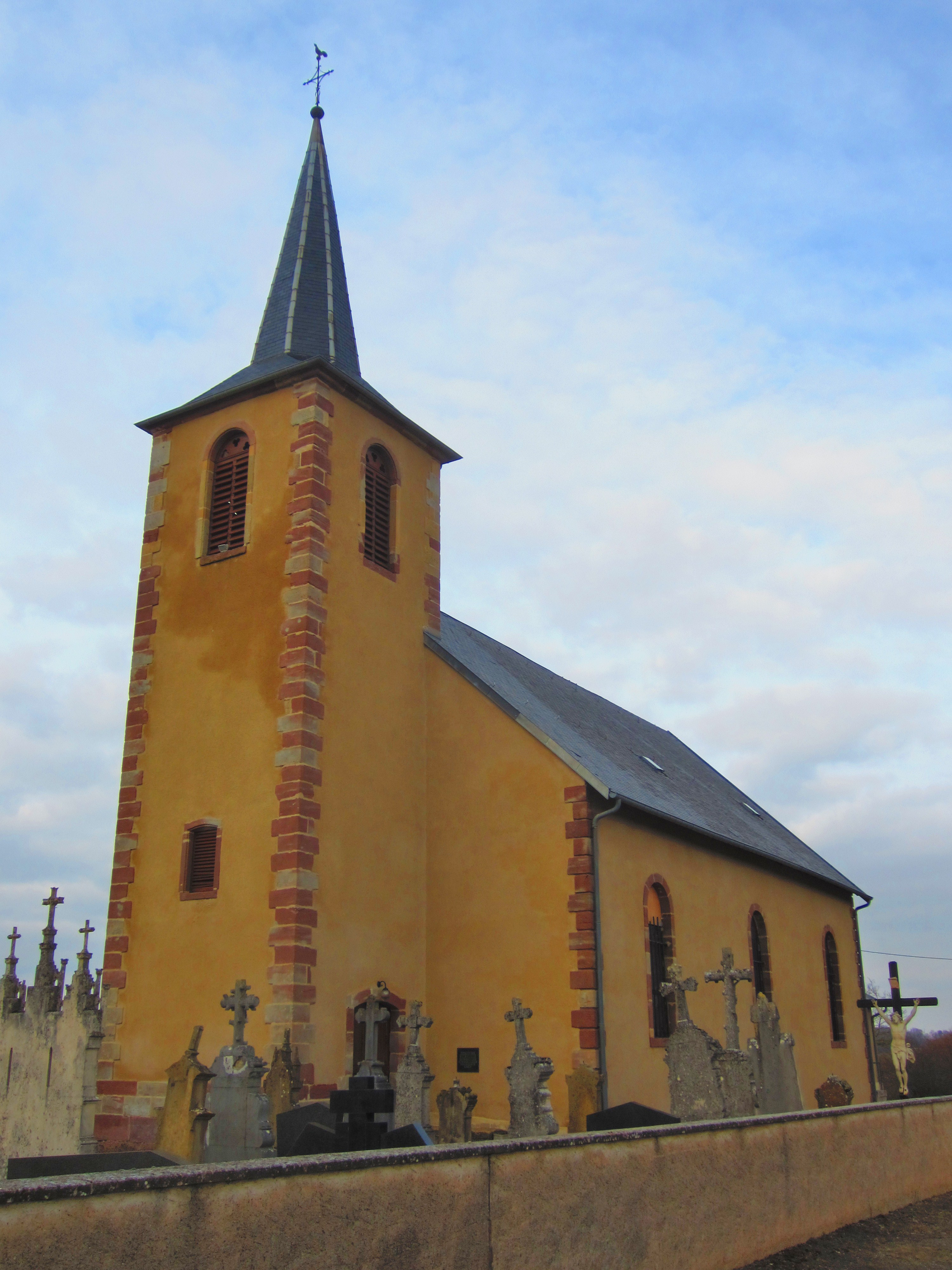
- The church in Menskirch

- Coat of arms
- Location of Menskirch
- Location within France Location within Grand Est
- Coordinates: 49°19′10″N 6°25′33″E
- Country: France
- Region: Grand Est
- Department: Moselle
- Arrondissement: Forbach-Boulay-Moselle
- Canton: Bouzonville
- Intercommunality: Bouzonvillois - Trois Frontières

Government
  - Mayor (2020–2026): Francis Grausem
- Area^{1}: 4.48 km^{2} (1.73 sq mi)
- Elevation: 240 m (790 ft)
- Highest elevation: 280 m (920 ft)
- Lowest elevation: 219 m (719 ft)
- Population (2023): 141
  - Density: 31.5/km^{2} (81.5/sq mi)
- Time zone: UTC+01:00 (CET)
  - Summer (DST): UTC+02:00 (CEST)
- INSEE/Postal code: 57457 /57320
- ^{1} French Land Register data, which excludes lakes, ponds, glaciers > 1 km^{2} (0.386 sq mi or 247 acres) and river estuaries.

Menskirch (French pronunciation: [mɛnskiʁʃ]; German: Menskirchen) is a commune in the Moselle department in Grand Est in north-eastern France.

== See also ==
- Communes of the Moselle department
