= Chémery-les-Deux =

- Commune
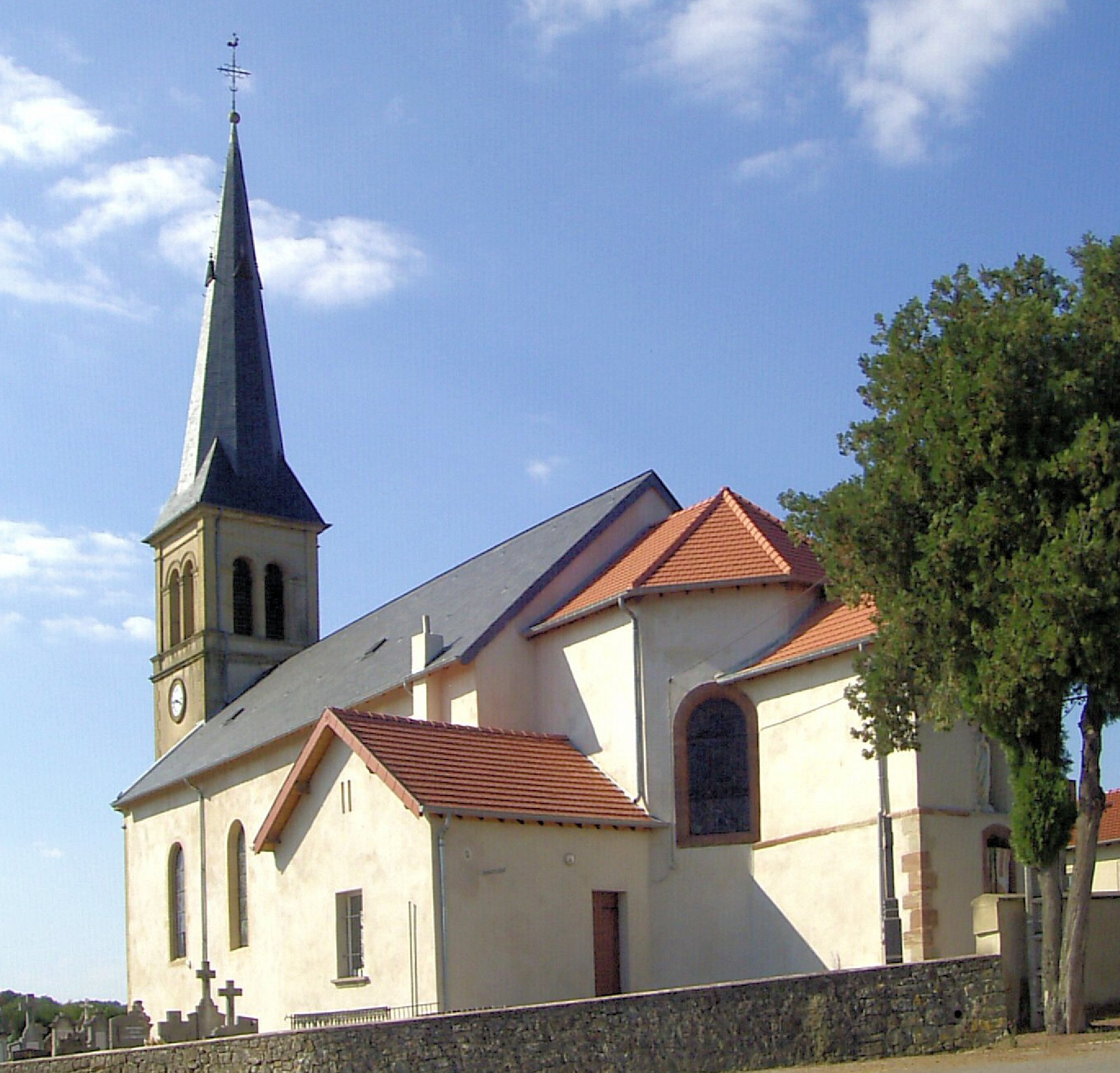
- The church in Chémery-les-Deux

- Coat of arms
- Location of Chémery-les-Deux
- Location within France Location within Grand Est
- Coordinates: 49°18′01″N 6°26′41″E
- Country: France
- Region: Grand Est
- Department: Moselle
- Arrondissement: Forbach-Boulay-Moselle
- Canton: Bouzonville
- Intercommunality: Bouzonvillois - Trois Frontières

Government
  - Mayor (2020–2026): Maurice Ochem
- Area^{1}: 10.03 km^{2} (3.87 sq mi)
- Elevation: 230 m (750 ft)
- Highest elevation: 284 m (932 ft)
- Lowest elevation: 209 m (686 ft)
- Population (2023): 597
  - Density: 59.5/km^{2} (154/sq mi)
- Time zone: UTC+01:00 (CET)
  - Summer (DST): UTC+02:00 (CEST)
- INSEE/Postal code: 57136 /57320
- ^{1} French Land Register data, which excludes lakes, ponds, glaciers > 1 km^{2} (0.386 sq mi or 247 acres) and river estuaries.

Chémery-les-Deux (French pronunciation: [ʃemʁi le dø]; German: Schemmerich) is a commune in the Moselle department in Grand Est in northeastern France.

Localities of the commune: Hobling (German: Hoblingen), Ingling (German: Inglingen), Klop.

== See also ==
- Communes of the Moselle department
