= Alzing =

- Commune
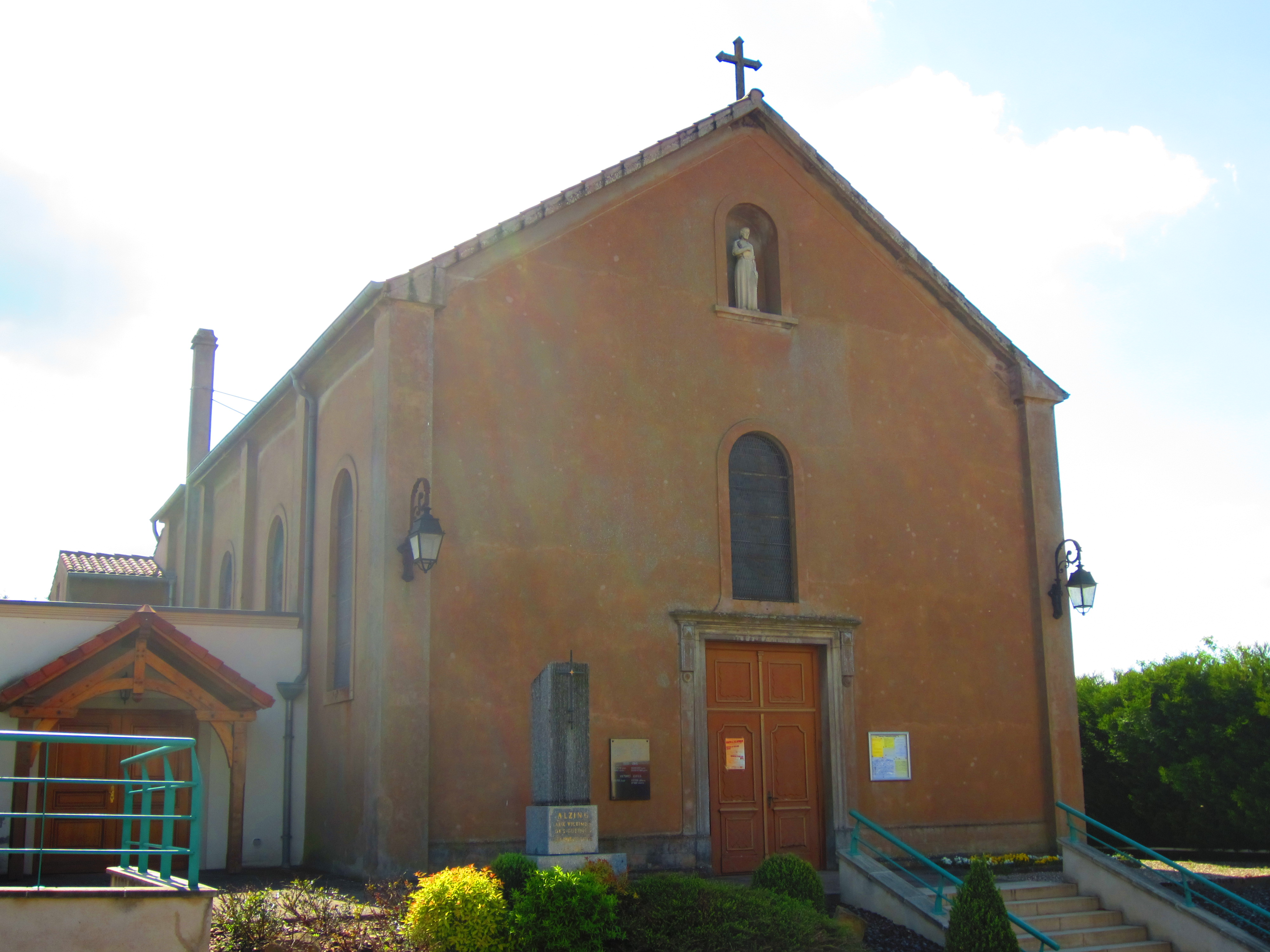
- The church in Alzing

- Coat of arms
- Location of Alzing
- Location within France Location within Grand Est
- Coordinates: 49°16′48″N 6°33′19″E
- Country: France
- Region: Grand Est
- Department: Moselle
- Arrondissement: Forbach-Boulay-Moselle
- Canton: Bouzonville

Government
  - Mayor (2020–2026): Jean-Marie Egler
- Area^{1}: 4.54 km^{2} (1.75 sq mi)
- Elevation: 300 m (980 ft)
- Highest elevation: 313 m (1,027 ft)
- Lowest elevation: 214 m (702 ft)
- Population (2023): 405
  - Density: 89.2/km^{2} (231/sq mi)
- Time zone: UTC+01:00 (CET)
  - Summer (DST): UTC+02:00 (CEST)
- INSEE/Postal code: 57016 /57320
- ^{1} French Land Register data, which excludes lakes, ponds, glaciers > 1 km^{2} (0.386 sq mi or 247 acres) and river estuaries.

Alzing (French pronunciation: [alzɛ̃]; German: Alzingen) is a commune in the Moselle department in Grand Est in northeastern France.

== Population ==
Historical population
Year	Pop.	±% p.a.
1968	364	—
1975	336	−1.14%
1982	339	+0.13%
1990	400	+2.09%
1999	399	−0.03%
2007	453	+1.60%
2012	417	−1.64%
2017	392	−1.23%
2023	405	+0.55%
Source: INSEE

== See also ==
- Communes of the Moselle department
