= Kerling-lès-Sierck =

Administrative division in Grand Est, France

- Commune
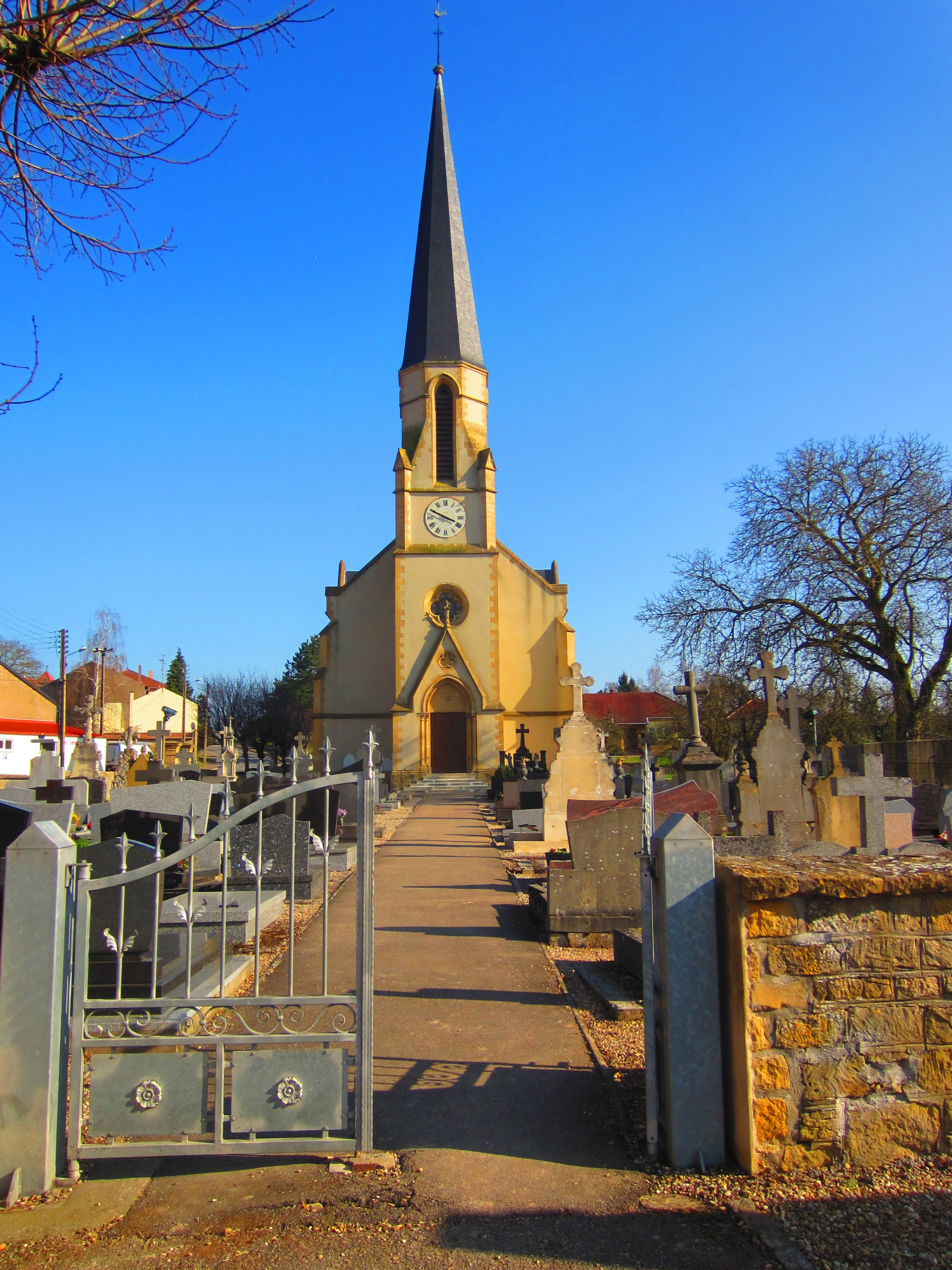
- The church in Kerling-lès-Sierck

- Coat of arms
- Location of Kerling-lès-Sierck
- Location within France Location within Grand Est
- Coordinates: 49°23′55″N 6°21′01″E
- Country: France
- Region: Grand Est
- Department: Moselle
- Arrondissement: Thionville
- Canton: Bouzonville
- Intercommunality: Bouzonvillois-Trois Frontières

Government
  - Mayor (2020–2026): Guy Hochard
- Area^{1}: 17.82 km^{2} (6.88 sq mi)
- Elevation: 380 m (1,250 ft)
- Highest elevation: 311 m (1,020 ft)
- Lowest elevation: 175 m (574 ft)
- Population (2023): 599
  - Density: 33.6/km^{2} (87.1/sq mi)
- Time zone: UTC+01:00 (CET)
  - Summer (DST): UTC+02:00 (CEST)
- INSEE/Postal code: 57361 /57480
- ^{1} French Land Register data, which excludes lakes, ponds, glaciers > 1 km^{2} (0.386 sq mi or 247 acres) and river estuaries.

Kerling-lès-Sierck (French pronunciation: [kɛʁlɛ̃ lɛ siʁk], lit. 'Kerling near Sierck'; Lorraine Franconian: Kiirléngen/Kerléngen; German: Kerlingen) is a commune in the Moselle department in Grand Est in north-eastern France.

== See also ==
- Communes of the Moselle department
