= Hargarten-aux-Mines =

- Commune
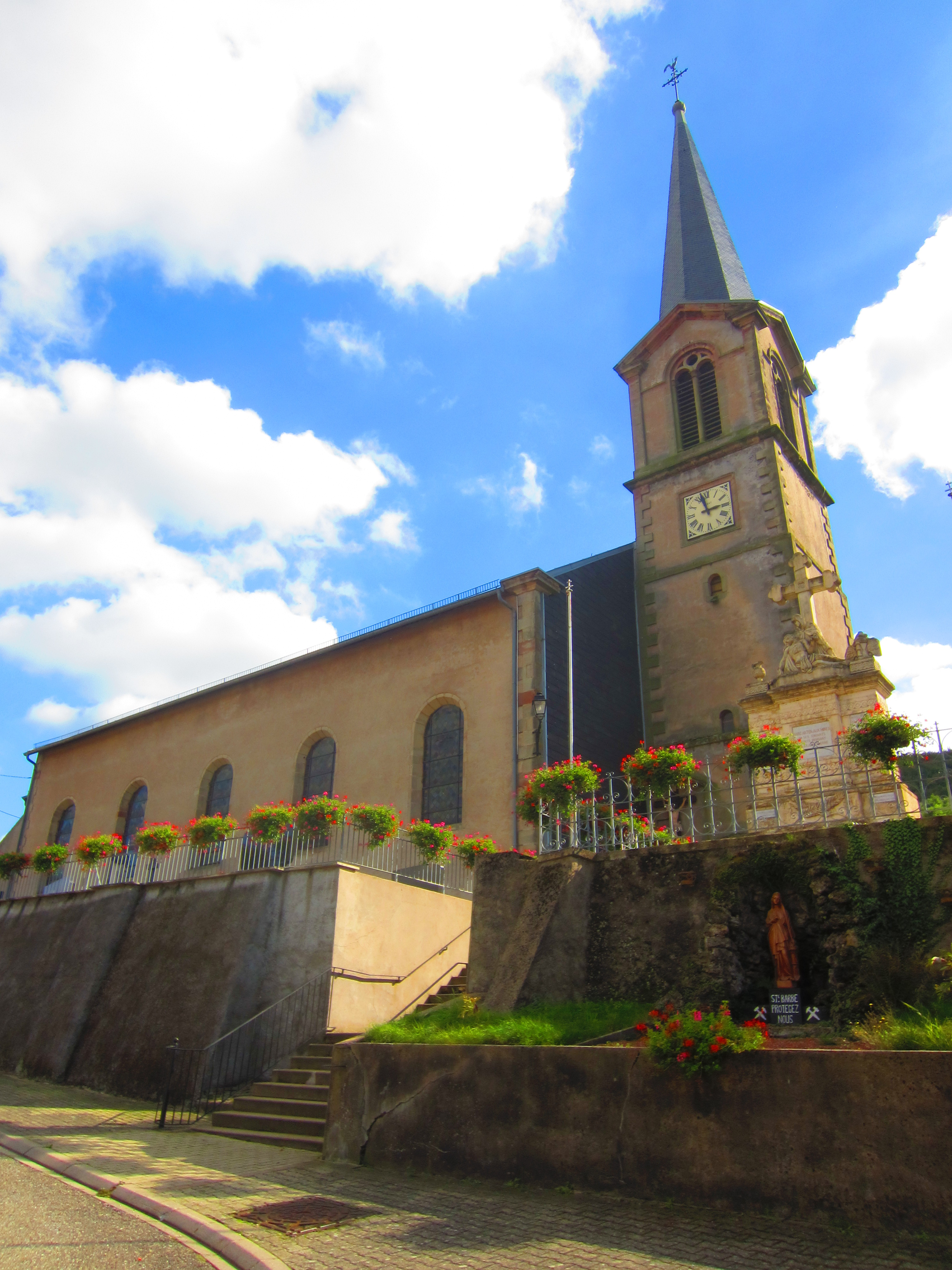
- The church in Hargarten-aux-Mines

- Coat of arms
- Location of Hargarten-aux-Mines
- Location within France Location within Grand Est
- Coordinates: 49°13′32″N 6°36′33″E
- Country: France
- Region: Grand Est
- Department: Moselle
- Arrondissement: Forbach-Boulay-Moselle
- Canton: Bouzonville
- Intercommunality: CC Houve-Pays Boulageois

Government
  - Mayor (2020–2026): Joseph Keller
- Area^{1}: 5.51 km^{2} (2.13 sq mi)
- Elevation: 220 m (720 ft)
- Highest elevation: 354 m (1,161 ft)
- Lowest elevation: 210 m (690 ft)
- Population (2023): 1,073
  - Density: 195/km^{2} (504/sq mi)
- Time zone: UTC+01:00 (CET)
  - Summer (DST): UTC+02:00 (CEST)
- INSEE/Postal code: 57296 /57550
- ^{1} French Land Register data, which excludes lakes, ponds, glaciers > 1 km^{2} (0.386 sq mi or 247 acres) and river estuaries.

Hargarten-aux-Mines (French pronunciation: [aʁɡaʁtən o min]; German: Hargarten) is a commune in the Moselle department in Grand Est in north-eastern France.

== See also ==
- Communes of the Moselle department
