= Bouzonville =

- Commune
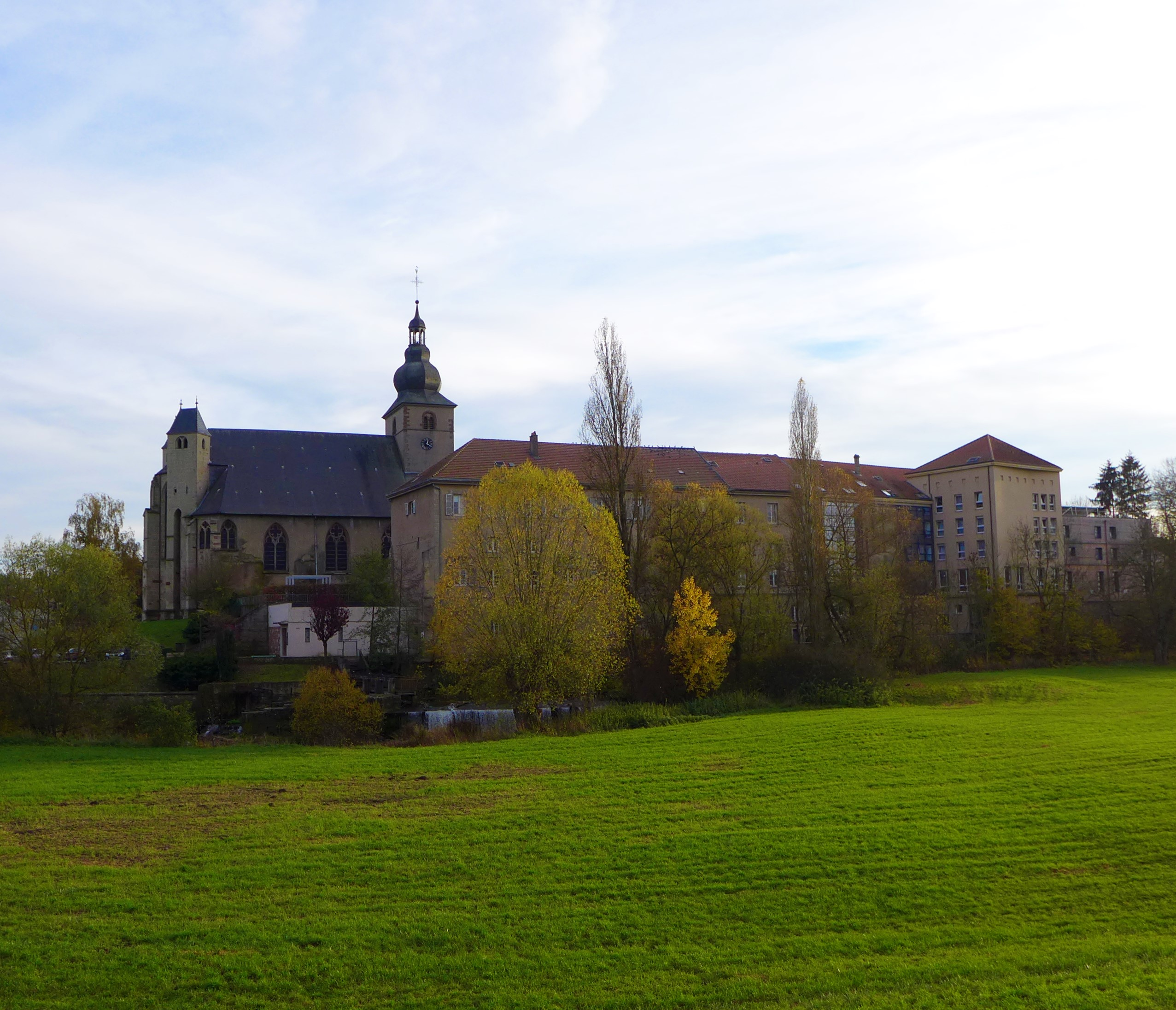
- Bouzonville, Buildings of the former Abbey of Sainte Croix upon the Nied

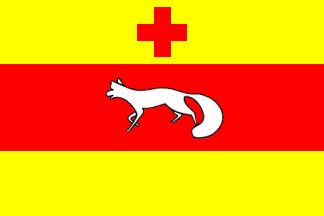
- Flag Coat of arms
- Location of Bouzonville
- Location within France Location within Grand Est
- Coordinates: 49°17′33″N 6°32′06″E
- Country: France
- Region: Grand Est
- Department: Moselle
- Arrondissement: Forbach-Boulay-Moselle
- Canton: Bouzonville
- Intercommunality: Bouzonvillois-Trois Frontières

Government
  - Mayor (2020–2026): Armel Chabane
- Area^{1}: 13.9 km^{2} (5.4 sq mi)
- Elevation: 190 m (620 ft)
- Highest elevation: 310 m (1,020 ft)
- Lowest elevation: 192 m (630 ft)
- Population (2023): 3,721
  - Density: 268/km^{2} (693/sq mi)
- Time zone: UTC+01:00 (CET)
  - Summer (DST): UTC+02:00 (CEST)
- INSEE/Postal code: 57106 /57320
- ^{1} French Land Register data, which excludes lakes, ponds, glaciers > 1 km^{2} (0.386 sq mi or 247 acres) and river estuaries.

Bouzonville (French pronunciation: [buzɔ̃vil]; German: Busendorf; Lorraine Franconian: Busendroff) is a commune in the Moselle department in Grand Est in northeastern France.

The localities of Aidling, Benting and Heckling are incorporated in the commune. It lies 35 km (22 mi) from Metz and the same distance from Thionville.

== History ==
Built on the "salt road" between the Rhine and the Moselle, at the site of an easy ford of the Nied, the site's traces of Celtic La Tène culture are most vividly represented by the "Bouzonville flagon", in which Scythian influence on Celtic craftsmenship is clearly represented in the animal that forms its handle and in the nature of coral inlays, with enamels of similar colour supplementing it, that form bands around the base and rim of the high-shouldered vessel; the beak-flagon was among a group of bronze objects from Bouzonville acquired by the British Museum in 1928. A minor Roman vicus represented by tiles that the plough turns up, complements the few signs of prehistory, though essentially pre-historic is the mute Merovingian necropolis of more than a hundred graves, holding twice as many women as men, 0.5 km (0.31 mi) east of the town; there is no trace of their habitations, which apparently supplied the villa attached to the -ville toponym. There is no agreement on the identity of the other element, apparently of one of the numerous Frankish magnates named Boso.

The village owes its real origins to the abbey founded here in 1033 by Adalbert, count of Metz and Juditha his wife; he was the grandfather of Gebhard, Duke of Lorraine, the first hereditary duke of Lorraine. Migne lists Bosonis Villa [de] S. Crucis S. Mariae, monast. ord. S. Bened. ann. 1033 a Juditha Adalberti comitio uxore... The Bosonis villa with its dependencies, is mentioned in a privilege granted to Galberga, abbess of Juviniacensis by Pope Urban II in 1096. The church of the Benedictine Abbey de Sainte-Croix de Bouzonville serves today as the parish church. In the thirteenth century the dukes of Lorraine established a court of justice here, which increased the life of the town, which depended on the abbey, which was rebuilt on its eleventh-century foundations. The Abbey of Bouzonville remained very much in the gift of the dukes of Lorraine, who were in the habit of bestowing the post of abbot in commendam on their relations to the end of the seventeenth century.

The town suffered so severely during the Thirty Years War that at the end of the seventeenth century Bouzonville numbered few more than two dozen hearths. An hôtel de ville, built in 1719 and enlarged in 1763 was symptomatic of the town's revival, as was a Jewish community, noted in 1726. The abbey was suppressed at the Revolution, the monks dispersed and the library sold. Tanneries and spinning mills developed the town's economy in the nineteenth century. The convent's buildings were restored sufficiently in 1893 to shelter a hospice. The First World War spared Bouzonville, but heavy fighting in the Second World War destroyed the bridge and 139 houses. More recently, Bouzonville has undergone a drain of its labour forces to German industry in Saarland.

== Population ==
Historical population
Year	Pop.	±% p.a.
1968	3,763	—
1975	4,232	+1.69%
1982	4,285	+0.18%
1990	4,148	−0.41%
1999	4,117	−0.08%
2007	4,178	+0.18%
2012	4,033	−0.70%
2017	3,947	−0.43%
2023	3,721	−0.98%
Source: INSEE

== Transport ==
Bouzonville station is served by the Nied Valley Railway (Niedtalbahn) and, until 1945, saw regular passenger services ran to Dillingen (Saar) and Metz. Today, the station is only served once a year on Good Friday with service from across the German border.

== Notable people ==
The renowned organ-builders Jean-Baptiste Stoltz and Georges Wenner were both born in Bouzonville in 1813 and 1819.

== See also ==
- Communes of the Moselle department
