= Arrondissement of Thionville-Ouest =

Coordinates: 49.35°N 6.15°E

Thionville-Ouest
- Former arrondissement
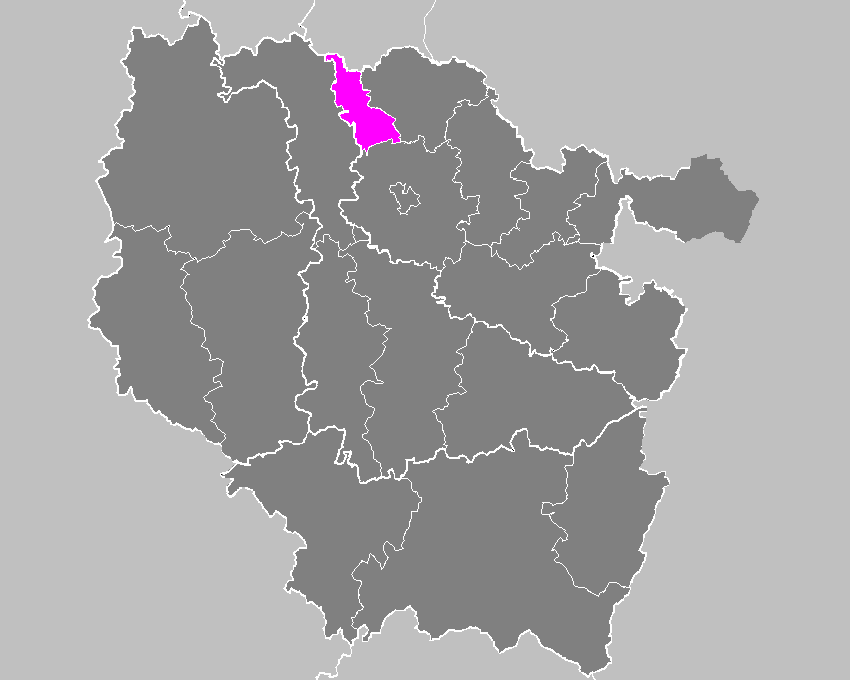
- Location within the former region Lorraine
- Country: France
- Region: Grand Est
- Department: Moselle
- No. of communes: {{{nbcomm}}}
- Disbanded: 2015
- Area: 255 km^{2} (98 sq mi)
- Population (2012): 121,927
  - Density: 478/km^{2} (1,240/sq mi)

The arrondissement of Thionville-Ouest is a former arrondissement of France in the Moselle department in the Lorraine region. In 2015 it was merged into the new arrondissement of Thionville. It had 30 communes, and its population was 121,927 (2012).

== Composition ==
The communes of the arrondissement of Thionville-Ouest, and their INSEE codes, were:

1. Algrange (57012)	2. Angevillers (57022)	3. Audun-le-Tiche (57038)	4. Aumetz (57041)
5. Boulange (57096)	6. Clouange (57143)	7. Fameck (57206)	8. Florange (57221)
9. Fontoy (57226)	10. Gandrange (57242)	11. Havange (57305)	12. Hayange (57306)
13. Knutange (57368)	14. Lommerange (57411)	15. Mondelange (57474)	16. Moyeuvre-Grande (57491)
17. Moyeuvre-Petite (57492)	18. Neufchef (57498)	19. Nilvange (57508)	20. Ottange (57529)
21. Ranguevaux (57562)	22. Richmont (57582)	23. Rochonvillers (57586)	24. Rosselange (57597)
25. Russange (57603)	26. Rédange (57565)	27. Serémange-Erzange (57647)	28. Tressange (57678)
29. Uckange (57683)	30. Vitry-sur-Orne (57724)		

== History ==
The arrondissement of Thionville-Ouest was created in 1919. It was disbanded in 2015. As a result of the reorganisation of the cantons of France which came into effect in 2015, the borders of the cantons are no longer related to the borders of the arrondissements. The cantons of the arrondissement of Thionville-Ouest were, as of January 2015:

1. Algrange
2. Fameck
3. Florange
4. Fontoy
5. Hayange
6. Moyeuvre-Grande
