= A30 autoroute =

Road in France

A30 autoroute
- Autoroute de la Vallée de la Fensch

Route information
- Part of E411
- Maintained by DIR Est
- Length: 25 km (16 mi)
- Existed: 1963–present

Major junctions
- South end: E25 / A 31 in Richemont

- North end: E411 / N 52 in Aumetz

Location
- Country: France

Highway system
- Roads in France; Autoroutes; Routes nationales

The A30 autoroute is a 29.2 kilometres (18.1 mi) long toll-free highway in northeastern France. The road is also named the Autoroute de la Vallée de la Fensch. It forms part of a southern by-pass for the town of Thionville.

== List of exits and junctions ==
Region	Department	Junction	Destinations	Notes
Grand Est	Moselle	A31 - A30	Metz, Mondelange	
Grand Est	Moselle	1 : Uckange	Uckange, Richemont, Guénange, Bousse	
Grand Est	Moselle	2/2a/2b : Fameck - Feltière	Florange, Fameck - centre, Serémange-Erzange, Thionville, Rombas	
Grand Est	Moselle	3 : Hayange	Hayange - centre, Neufchef	
Grand Est	Moselle	4 : Nilvange-Knutange	Hayange - ouest, Nilvange, Knutange, Algrange	
Grand Est	Moselle	Aire de repos de la Castine (westbound); Aire de repos du Bois des Tillots (eastbound)		
Grand Est	Moselle	5 : Fontoy	Fontoy, Audun-le-Roman, Briey, Boulange	
Grand Est	Moselle	6 : Havange	Havange, Boulange, Tressange, Thionville, Angevillers	
Grand Est	Moselle	7 : Aumetz	Briey, Audun-le-Tiche, Étain, Audun-le-Roman, Aumetz, Esch-sur-Alzette (Luxembourg)	
Grand Est	Moselle	E411 / A 30 becomes E411 / N 52		
1.000 mi = 1.609 km; 1.000 km = 0.621 mi
