= Havange =

Havange Hiewéng (Lorraine Franconian)
- Commune
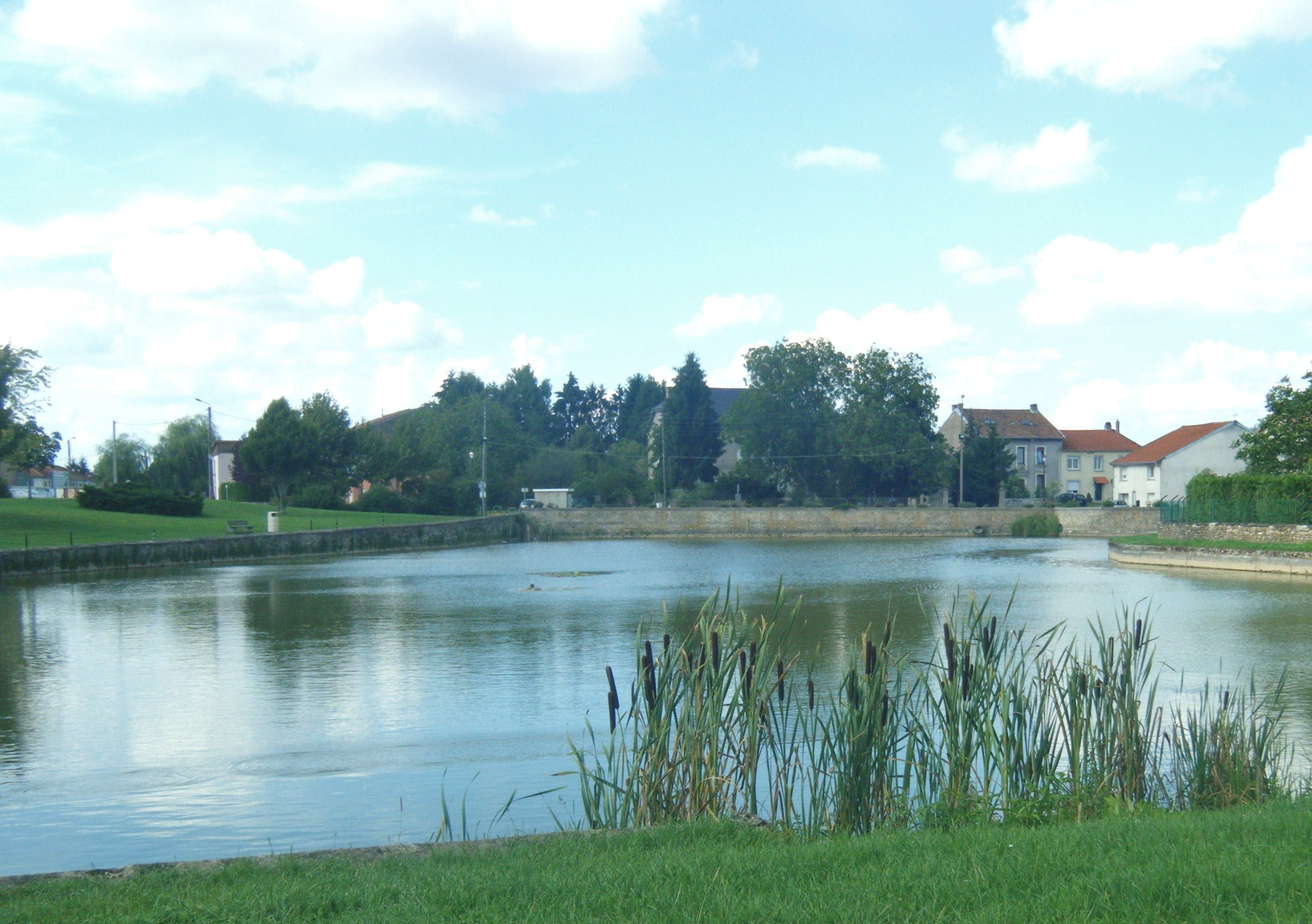
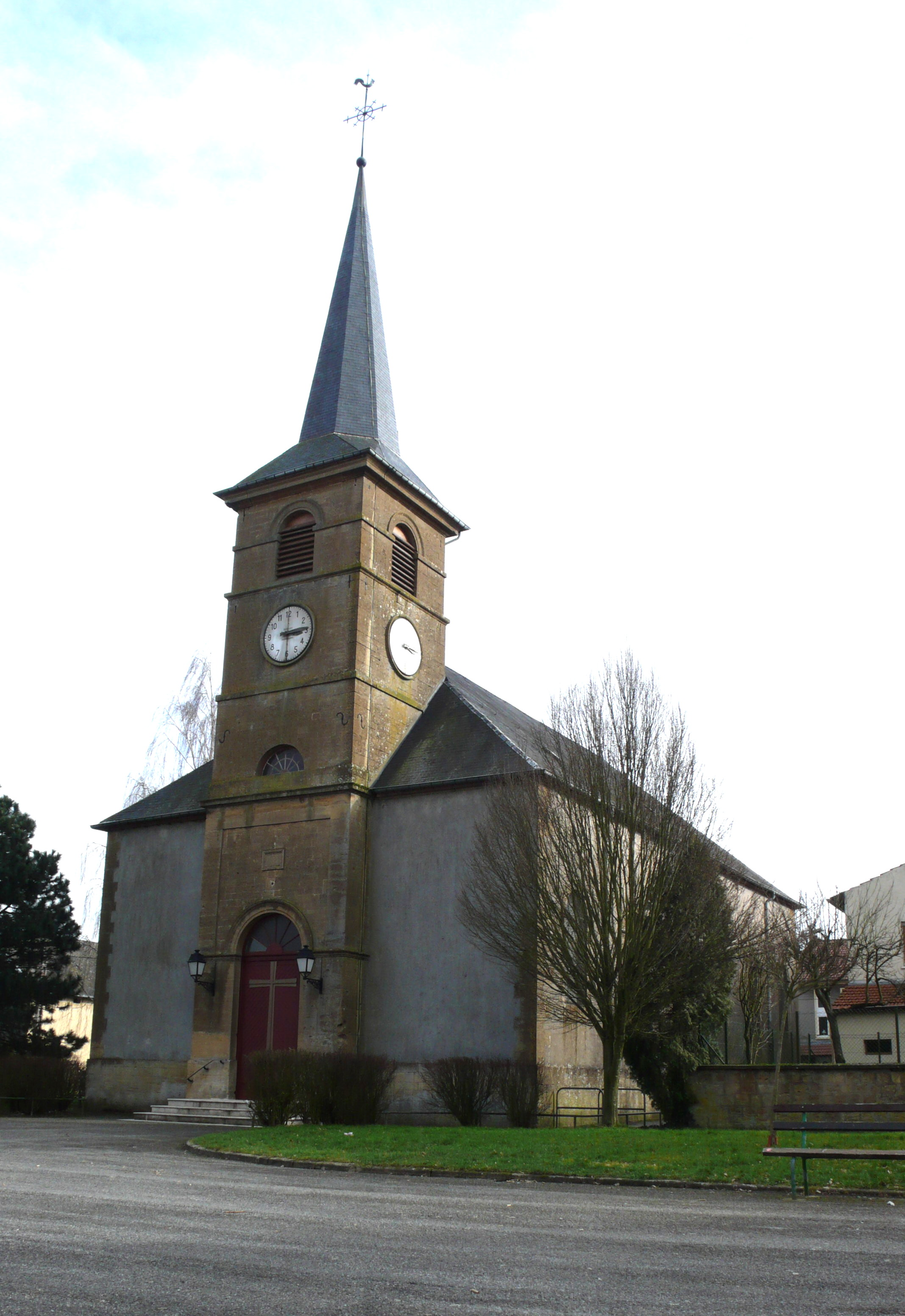
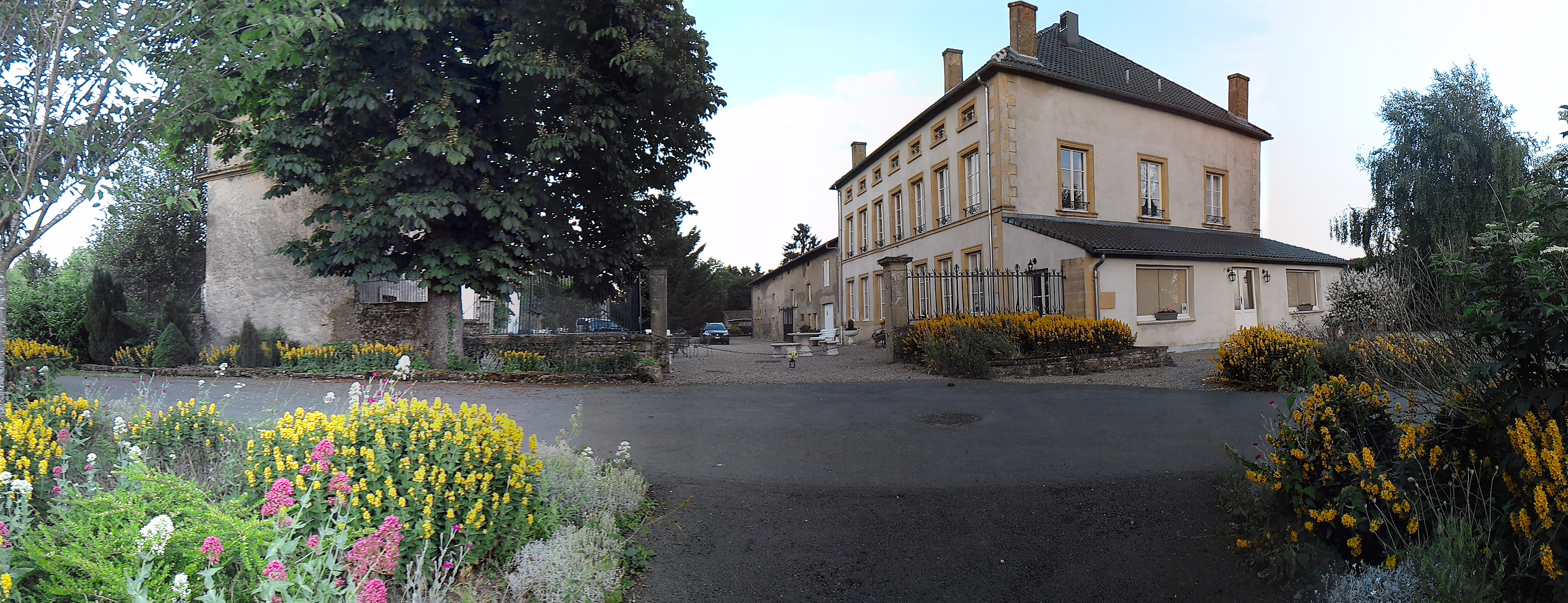
- Top to bottom, left to right: Étang d’Havange; Église Saint-Jean Baptiste; Domaine de Gondrange

- Coat of arms
- Location of Havange
- Location within France Location within Grand Est
- Coordinates: 49°23′20″N 5°59′39″E
- Country: France
- Region: Grand Est
- Department: Moselle
- Arrondissement: Thionville
- Canton: Algrange
- Intercommunality: CA Portes de France-Thionville

Government
  - Mayor (2020–2026): Marc Ferrero
- Area^{1}: 9.65 km^{2} (3.73 sq mi)
- Elevation: 330 m (1,080 ft)
- Highest elevation: 367 m (1,204 ft)
- Lowest elevation: 308 m (1,010 ft)
- Population (2023): 456
  - Density: 47.3/km^{2} (122/sq mi)
- Time zone: UTC+01:00 (CET)
  - Summer (DST): UTC+02:00 (CEST)
- INSEE/Postal code: 57305 /57650
- ^{1} French Land Register data, which excludes lakes, ponds, glaciers > 1 km^{2} (0.386 sq mi or 247 acres) and river estuaries.

Havange (French pronunciation: [avɑ̃ʒ]; Luxembourgish: Hiewéng ; German: Havingen) is a commune in the Moselle department in Grand Est in north-eastern France.

Havange is located between the communes of Tressange in the North, Rochonvillers in the Northeast, Angevillers in the East, Fontoy in the South and Boulange in the West. The village is located close to the Maginot Line, in which one of the casemates of the Ouvrage Aumetz is located in Havange. Despite being in the countryside, the village is very well linked to the bigger cities farther away as it is connected to the A30 autoroute to go to Metz, Southwestern Luxembourg or Belgium and to the D14 Dual carriageway to go to Thionville or Luxembourg (via the A31 autoroute), where most of the people work, go shopping or travel to farther places by air or train.

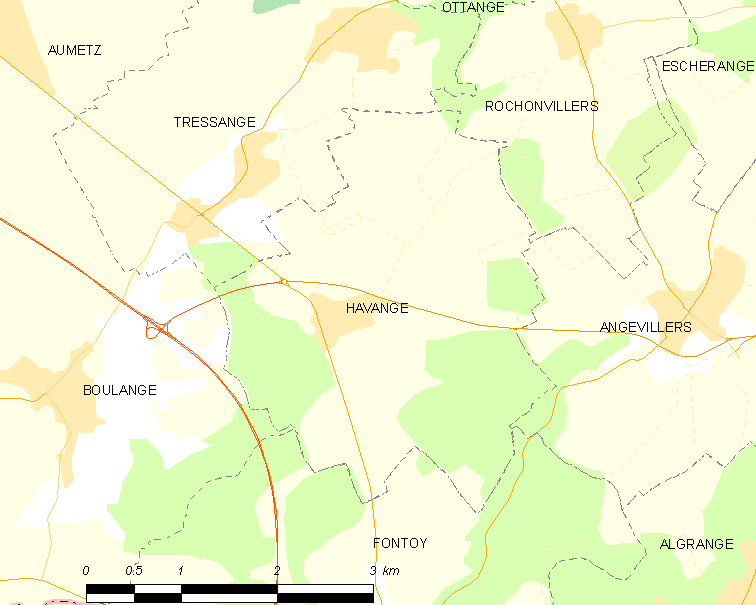
Map of Havange

== See also ==
- Communes of the Moselle department
