= Fensch =

Fensch Fentsch
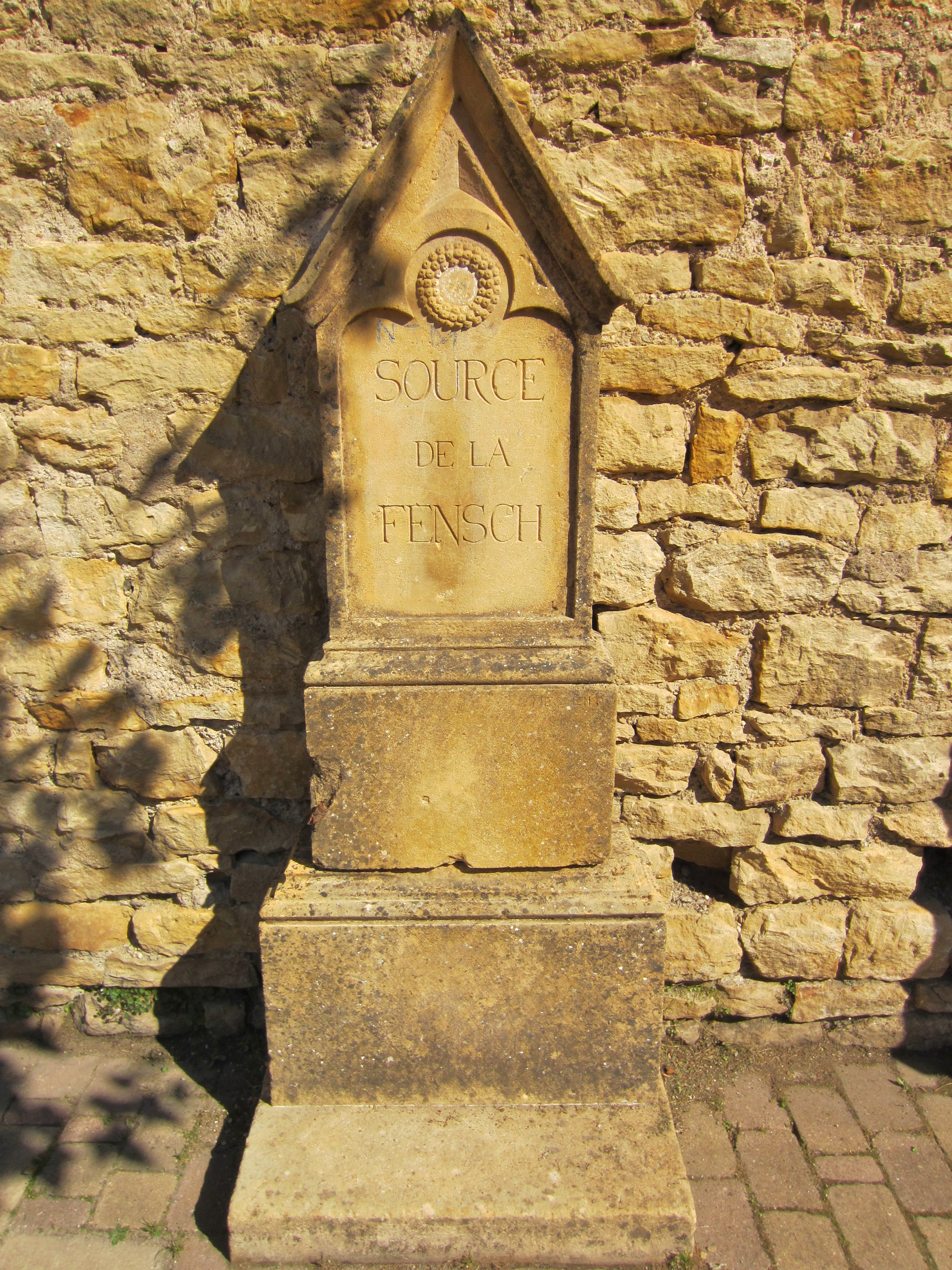
- The source of the Fensch in Fontoy.

- Location within France Location within Grand Est

Location
- Country: France
- Region: Grand Est
- Department: Moselle
- Cantons: Algrange, Hayange, Fameck, Yutz

Physical characteristics
- Source
  - location: Fontoy
  - coordinates: 49.3531°N 5.9979°E
  - elevation: 239 metres (784 ft)
- Mouth: Moselle
  - location: Illange
  - coordinates: 49.3314°N 6.1694°E
  - elevation: 156 metres (512 ft)
- Length: 15.2 kilometres (9.4 mi)
- Basin size: 83 square kilometres (32 sq mi)
- Discharge
  - location: Florange
  - average: 2.06 cubic metres per second (73 cu ft/s)

Basin features
- Progression: Moselle→ Rhine→ North Sea
- Tributaries
  - right: Krisbach

The Fensch (French pronunciation: [fɛnʃ]) or Fentsch is a river in the Moselle department of the Grand Est region of France. It is a left tributary of the Moselle, and thus a sub-tributary of the Rhine.

== Geography ==
The Fensch is 15.2 kilometres (9.4 mi) long. It rises in Fontoy in the west of the Moselle department. It then crosses Knutange, Nilvange, Hayange, Serémange-Erzange and Florange before discharging from the left into the Moselle between Metz and Thionville on the border of the commune of Illange. It generally flows from west to east.

Originally, as shown by the Cassini map, the waters of the lower part of the Fensch combined with the waters of the Veymerange and fed the moat around the town of Thionville before joining the Moselle. After the removal of the fortifications, the Fensch was diverted to its current course to supply water to the new ironworks installed a little south of this locality. The springs of Morlange (now part of Fameck) and of Ranguevaux were captured in 1886 and carried by gravity to Thionville by a 10 kilometres (6.2 mi) long conduit.

== Names ==
- Feuschen (1403), Fensth (1544), Flensch (1606), Fenche (1779), Feusche
- In German: Fentsch

== Communes and cantons crossed ==
The Fensch crosses seven communes and four cantons in the department of Moselle. From upstream to downstream these are Fontoy (source), Knutange, Nilvange, Hayange, Serémange-Erzange, Florange and Illange (mouth). In terms of cantons, the Fensch originates in the canton of Algrange, crosses the canton of Hayange and canton of Fameck, and has its mouth in the canton of Yutz.

== Tributaries ==
The river has four tributaries: (Note: There are two tributaries according to Sandre : the Krisbach stream and the canalized Moselle.)

- The petite Fensch
- The Krisbach or Krebsbach 9.6 kilometres (6.0 mi) long in the three communes of Ranguevaux, Fameck and Florange.
- The Algrange and Marspich streams
- The canalized Moselle

== Hydrology ==
The Fensch is fed by a fairly high rainfall. It also receives significant amounts of mine water from mines in the region, (Note: The discharge from the Mine de la Paix alone is 0.535 cubic metres per second (18.9 cu ft/s).) which helps to increase the flow. The flow was observed for a period of 35 years (1968–2002) in Florange, a locality in the Moselle department at its confluence with the Moselle. The total area of the river's watershed is 82.6 square kilometres (31.9 sq mi). The average flow of the river at Florange is 2.06 cubic metres per second (73 cu ft/s).

The Fensch has very moderate seasonal fluctuations of flow, which is rarely the case in northern Lorraine. High water events occur in winter and are characterized by average monthly flows in the range of 2.37 to 3.25 cubic metres per second (84 to 115 cu ft/s) from December to April inclusive (with a maximum in February). Beginning in April, the flow gradually decreases to the low summer-fall waters that occur from July to October. The average monthly flow decreases to a consistent flow of about 1.30 cubic metres per second (46 cu ft/s) in September. The fluctuations are more pronounced over short periods or between years.

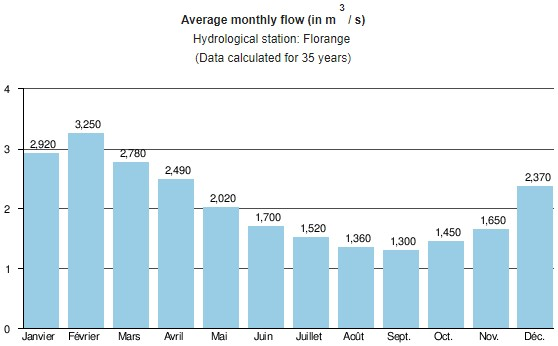

At low water level, the 3 consecutive-day minimum flow can drop to 0.54 cubic metres per second (19 cu ft/s) during a five-year dry period, which is far from severe. Floods are moderately important, given the small size of its watershed. They are proportionally more or less half as large as those of its neighbor, the Orne. The 2-year and 5-year peak instantaneous flows are 7.6 cubic metres per second (270 cu ft/s) and 9.5 cubic metres per second (340 cu ft/s). The 10-year peak flow is 11 cubic metres per second (390 cu ft/s), the 20-year peak flow is 12 cubic metres per second (420 cu ft/s) and the 50-year peak flow is 14 cubic metres per second (490 cu ft/s). The highest instantaneous flow recorded at Florange was 12.3 cubic metres per second (430 cu ft/s) on 12 April 1983, with an average flow of 11.5 cubic metres per second (410 cu ft/s) that day. This flood was of a two-year order, and therefore not at all exceptional.

Overall, the Fensch is a very abundant river, more than most rivers of the Moselle basin, particularly those of the Moselle department. Annual rainfall in its basin is 789 millimetres (31.1 in), which is more than twice that of France as a whole and well above the average of the French part of the Moselle basin, which is 445 millimetres (17.5 in) per year. The river's flow reaches 24.9 litres per second (0.88 cu ft/s) per 1 square kilometre (0.39 sq mi) of the basin.

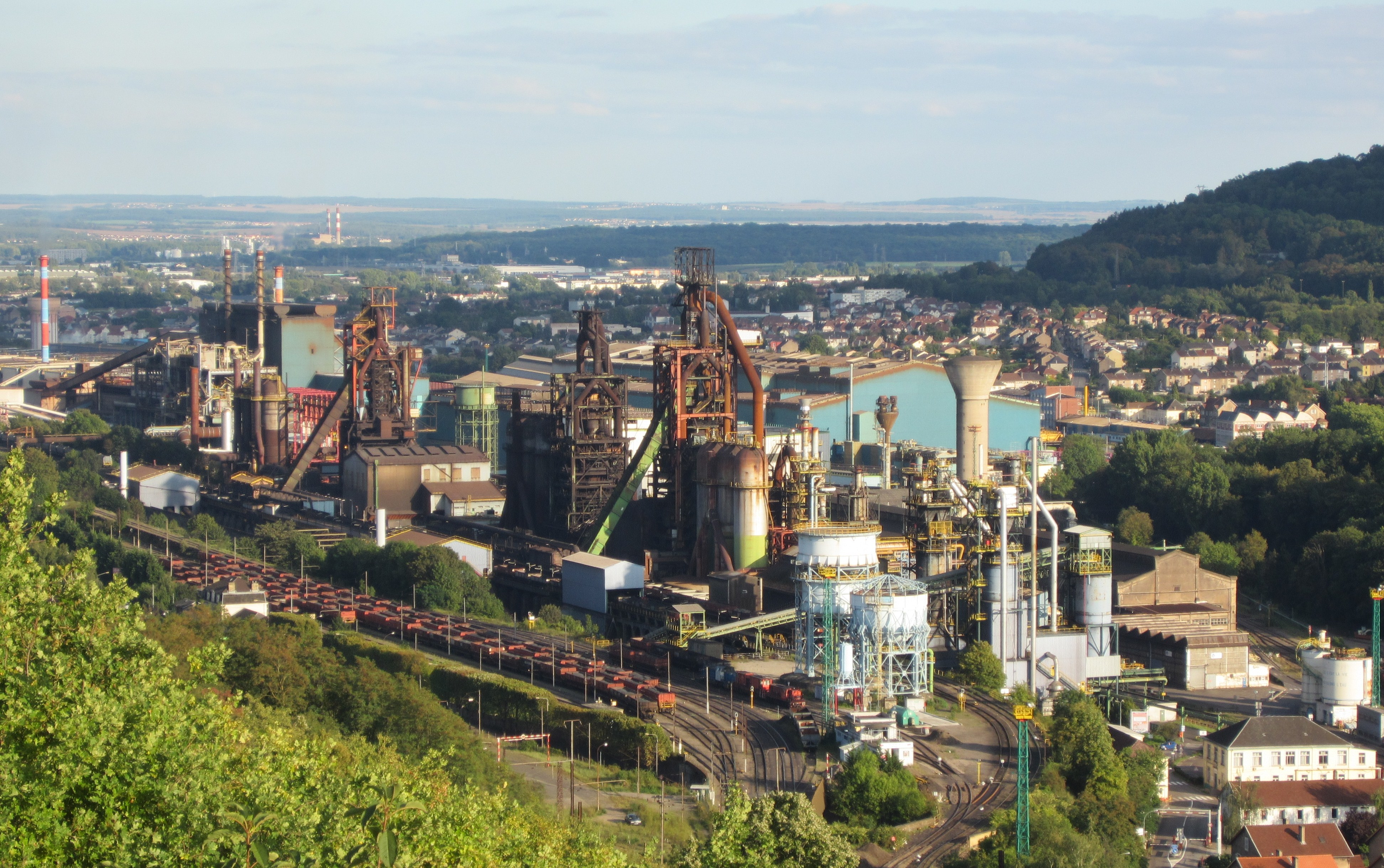
Hayange steelworks

== Industry ==
The Fensch Valley is known for its iron and steel industry. Part of the course of the river is even covered where it crosses the town of Hayange and by facilities of the ArcelorMittal ironworks of Florange. The foundation stone for the Sollac mill was laid on 23 December 1949 in the small village of Serémange on the banks of Fensch river. U.S. Ambassador David K. E. Bruce said at the groundbreaking ceremony, which was attended by the French Foreign Minister Robert Schuman and Minister of Industry Robert Lacoste, that he hoped the French iron-steel industry would soon be the first in Europe".

== Culture ==
The region inspired Bernard Lavilliers's Fensch Vallée, the title song of his fourth album, Les Barbares (1976).

== Sources ==
- Bouteiller, ed. (1868), Dictionnaire topographique de l'ancien département de la Moselle
- Géoportail, Géoportail: Institut Géographique National (France)
- Jouy, Étienne (1823), Œuvres complètes d'Étienne Jouy - avec des éclaircissements et des notes
- "La Fensch à Florange [Maisons Neuves]", Banque Hydro - MEDDE (in French), archived from the original on 2021-11-22
- Kipping, Matthias (Fall 1994), "Competing for Dollars and Technology: The United States and the Modernization of the French and German Steel Industries after World War II", Business and Economic History, 23 (1): 229–240, JSTOR 23702848
- Our mills - ArcelorMittal Florange, ArcelorMittal
- Une Ville ... Une histoire (in French), Ville de Serémange-Erzange, archived from the original on 2017-10-21
