= Mario Giubilei =

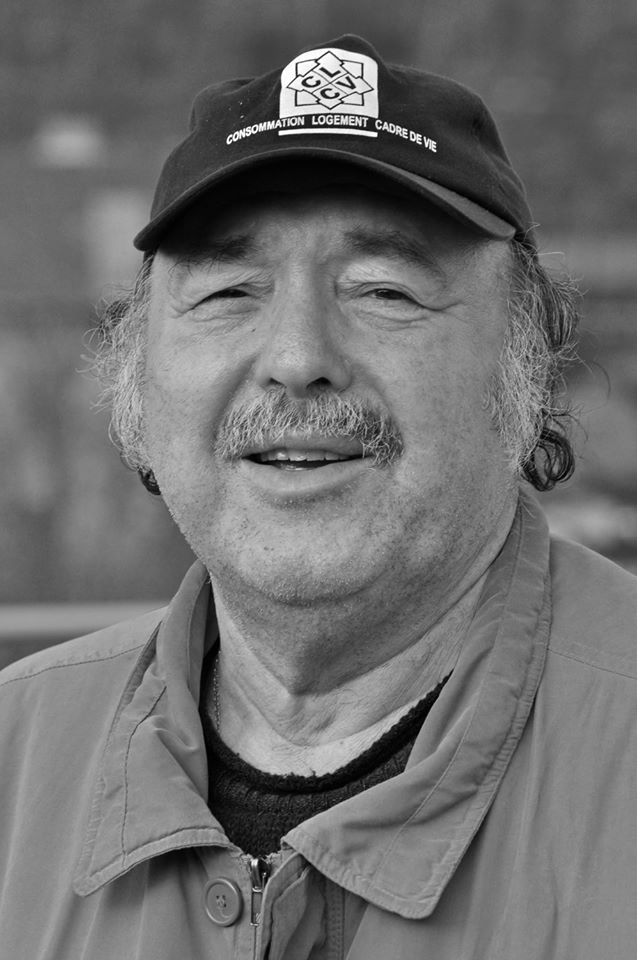
- Born: 30 December 1941; Nocera Umbra, Italy
- Died: 14 December 2016 (aged 74); Fameck, France

Mario Giubilei (30 December 1941 – 14 December 2016) was a French worker-priest who devoted himself to work among the local youth and the disadvantage population of the Fensch Valley in Moselle, France. He was also known as one of the founders of the Fameck Arabic Film Festival (Festival du Film Arabe de Fameck).

After he died on 14 December 2016, the Deputy Mayor of Fameck Michel Liebgott as well as many other personalities of the region and the local residents paid tribute to his life work. The influences of his contributions to the community and society had reached several communes of France, including Fameck, Uckange and Florange.

== Biography ==
=== Early life ===
As a son of a Catholic mother and a Communist father who worked as a shoemaker, Mario Giubilei was born on 30 December 1941 in Nocera Umbra, Perugia, Italy, and grew up in Aumetz, Lorraine, France.

In 1962, he performed his military service and was sent to Algeria for 6 months during the Algerian War.

=== Priesthood ===
On 29 June 1967, Mario Giubilei was ordained a Catholic priest in the Metz Cathedral (Cathédrale Saint Étienne de Metz) by the Bishop of Metz, Monseigneur Paul-Joseph Schmitt. In 1972, after serving in Fameck and Uckange for nearly 5 years, he decided to become a worker-priest and started to work in a factory in Florange. The employers dismissed him as soon as they discovered that he was a priest. Later, he chose a different path of unionism for the right to housing and living environment care.

In 1982, he was employed as the concierge by the Social Centre of Fameck (Cité Sociale de Fameck) to which he had already belonged when it was founded in 1975.

On 18 February 1987, he created the organization called "Train of the Nations" (Train des Nations, also known as "Train de la Tolérance") that offered various trips to the youngsters, bringing 680 children with 120 chaperones to Paris firstly, and later to Bâle, Venice, Brussels, Barcelona, London, the Netherlands, Monaco and so forth. Through this project, there were around 16,000 children in total who had the opportunity to leave the ghetto and explore the world. 3 years later, he and René Cahen founded the Fameck Arabic Film Festival for which he invited the local artist Jean Scuderi (Scud) to collaborate on the poster design afterwards. The Festival so far has still taken place in October every year.

After retiring in 2004, Mario Giubilei was officially decorated with the recognition medal by the Algerian authorities for his work with the Algerian community and his effort to develop the Arab culture.

He died on 14 December 2016.
