= Communauté d'agglomération Portes de France-Thionville =

Portes de France-Thionville
- Communauté d'agglomération
- Location in the Moselle department
- Coordinates: 49°22′N 06°10′E
- Country: France
- Region: Grand Est
- Department: Moselle
- No. of communes: {{{nbcomm}}}
- Established: 2004
- Area: 156.5 km^{2} (60.4 sq mi)
- Population (2019): 80,927
  - Density: 517.1/km^{2} (1,339/sq mi)
- Website: www.agglo-thionville.fr

Communauté d'agglomération Portes de France-Thionville is the communauté d'agglomération, an intercommunal structure, centred on the city of Thionville. It is located in the Moselle department, in the Grand Est region, northeastern France. Created in 2004, its seat is in Thionville. Its area is 156.5 km^{2}. Its population was 80,927 in 2019, of which 40,778 in Thionville proper.

== Composition ==
The communauté d'agglomération consists of the following 13 communes:

1. Angevillers
2. Basse-Ham
3. Fontoy
4. Havange
5. Illange
6. Kuntzig
7. Lommerange
8. Manom
9. Rochonvillers
10. Terville
11. Thionville
12. Tressange
13. Yutz

== Future ==
By January 1, 2026, the C.A.P.F.T. will fusion with the neighboring communauté d'agglomération Val de Fensch, creating the new "Thionville Fensch Agglomération", accumulating more than a 100,000 inhabitants, making it by far by population the 2nd agglomeration of Moselle, the 6th agglomeration of the region Grand Est, and the 33th of France.
