= Manom =

- Commune
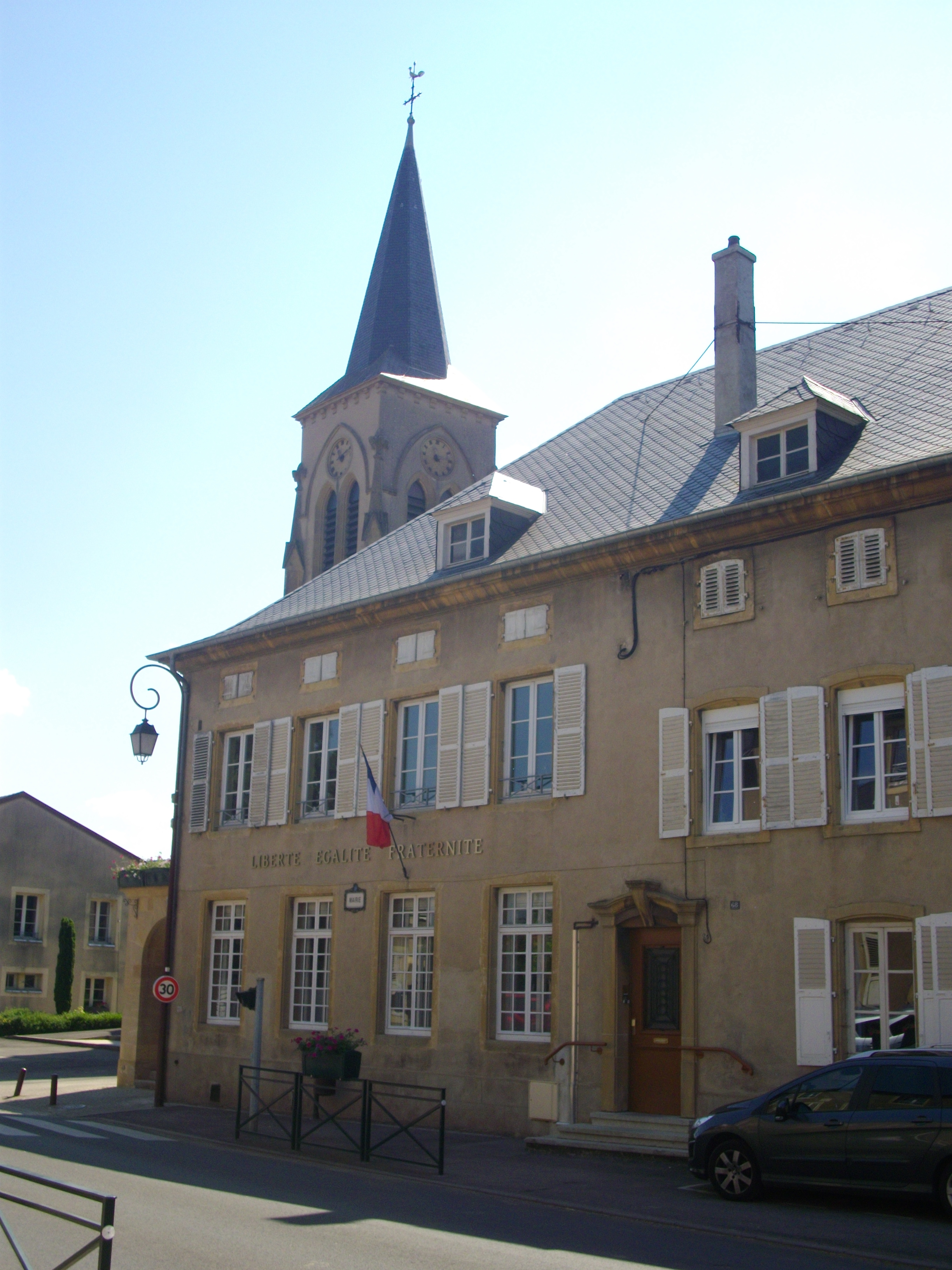
- The town hall in Manom

- Coat of arms
- Location of Manom
- Location within France Location within Grand Est
- Coordinates: 49°22′11″N 6°11′20″E
- Country: France
- Region: Grand Est
- Department: Moselle
- Arrondissement: Thionville
- Canton: Yutz
- Intercommunality: CA Portes de France-Thionville

Government
  - Mayor (2020–2026): Marie-Laurence Herfeld
- Area^{1}: 10.39 km^{2} (4.01 sq mi)
- Highest elevation: 245 m (804 ft)
- Lowest elevation: 148 m (486 ft)
- Population (2023): 3,137
  - Density: 301.9/km^{2} (782.0/sq mi)
- Time zone: UTC+01:00 (CET)
  - Summer (DST): UTC+02:00 (CEST)
- INSEE/Postal code: 57441 /57100
- ^{1} French Land Register data, which excludes lakes, ponds, glaciers > 1 km^{2} (0.386 sq mi or 247 acres) and river estuaries.

Manom (French pronunciation: [manɔm]; German: Monhofen) is a commune in the Moselle department in Grand Est in north-eastern France.

Localities of the commune: la Grange (German: Scheuern), Maison-Rouge.

== Population ==
Historical population
Year	Pop.	±% p.a.
1968	2,054	—
1975	2,065	+0.08%
1982	1,806	−1.90%
1990	2,624	+4.78%
1999	2,721	+0.40%
2007	2,630	−0.42%
2012	2,594	−0.28%
2017	2,872	+2.06%
2023	3,137	+1.48%
Source: INSEE

== International relations ==
Manom is twinned with:

- Lębork, Poland
- Lauenburg, Germany
- Dudelange, Luxembourg

== See also ==
- Communes of the Moselle department
