= Basse-Ham =

- Commune
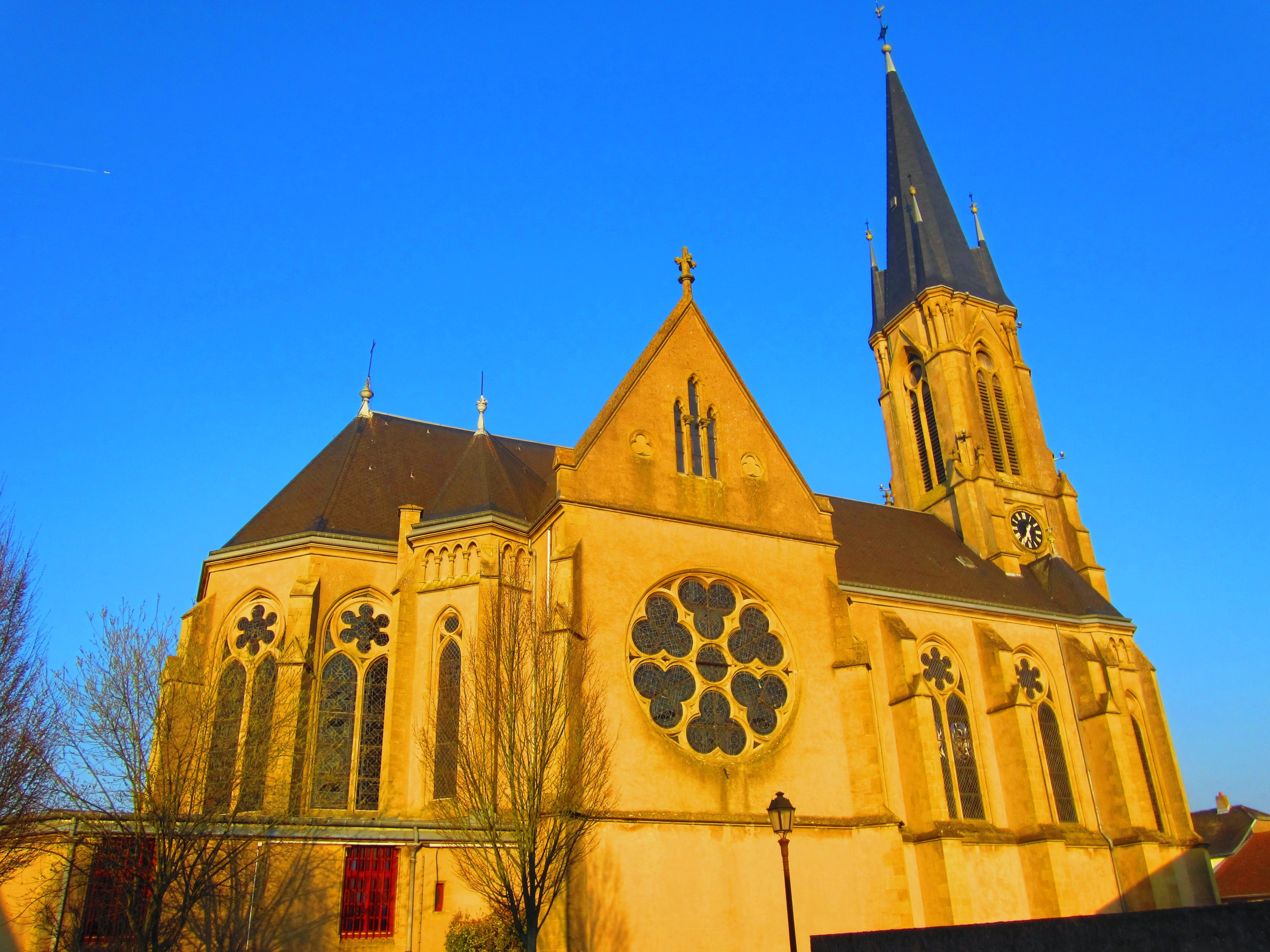
- The church in Basse-Ham

- Coat of arms
- Location of Basse-Ham
- Location within France Location within Grand Est
- Coordinates: 49°23′12″N 6°14′38″E
- Country: France
- Region: Grand Est
- Department: Moselle
- Arrondissement: Thionville
- Canton: Metzervisse
- Intercommunality: CA Portes de France-Thionville

Government
  - Mayor (2020–2026): Bernard Veinnant
- Area^{1}: 10.05 km^{2} (3.88 sq mi)
- Highest elevation: 249 m (817 ft)
- Lowest elevation: 149 m (489 ft)
- Population (2023): 2,349
  - Density: 233.7/km^{2} (605.4/sq mi)
- Time zone: UTC+01:00 (CET)
  - Summer (DST): UTC+02:00 (CEST)
- INSEE/Postal code: 57287 /57970
- ^{1} French Land Register data, which excludes lakes, ponds, glaciers > 1 km^{2} (0.386 sq mi or 247 acres) and river estuaries.

Basse-Ham (French pronunciation: [bas am]; German: Niederham) is a commune in the Moselle department in Grand Est in northeastern France.

== Population ==
Historical population
Year	Pop.	±% p.a.
1968	1,895	—
1975	2,016	+0.89%
1982	2,141	+0.86%
1990	1,986	−0.93%
1999	1,883	−0.59%
2007	2,127	+1.53%
2012	2,383	+2.30%
2017	2,237	−1.26%
2023	2,349	+0.82%
Source: INSEE

== See also ==
- Communes of the Moselle department
