= Communauté d'agglomération du Val de Fensch =

Val de Fensch
- Communauté d'agglomération
- Interactive map of Val de Fensch
- Coordinates: 49°19′N 06°05′E
- Country: France
- Region: Grand Est
- Department: Moselle
- No. of communes: {{{nbcomm}}}
- Established: 2000

Government
  - President: Michel Liebgott (PS)
- Area: 86.2 km^{2} (33.3 sq mi)
- Population (2019): 70,772
  - Density: 821/km^{2} (2,130/sq mi)
- Website: www.agglo-valdefensch.fr

Communauté d'agglomération du Val de Fensch is a communauté d'agglomération, an intercommunal structure, in the Moselle department, in the Grand Est region, northeastern France. It covers the industrial area between Metz and Thionville. Its name refers to the river Fensch. Created in 2000, its seat is in Hayange. Its area is 86.2 km^{2}. Its population was 70,772 in 2019.

== Composition ==
The communauté d'agglomération consists of the following 10 communes:

1. Algrange
2. Fameck
3. Florange
4. Hayange
5. Knutange
6. Neufchef
7. Nilvange
8. Ranguevaux
9. Serémange-Erzange
10. Uckange
