= Rédange =

- Commune
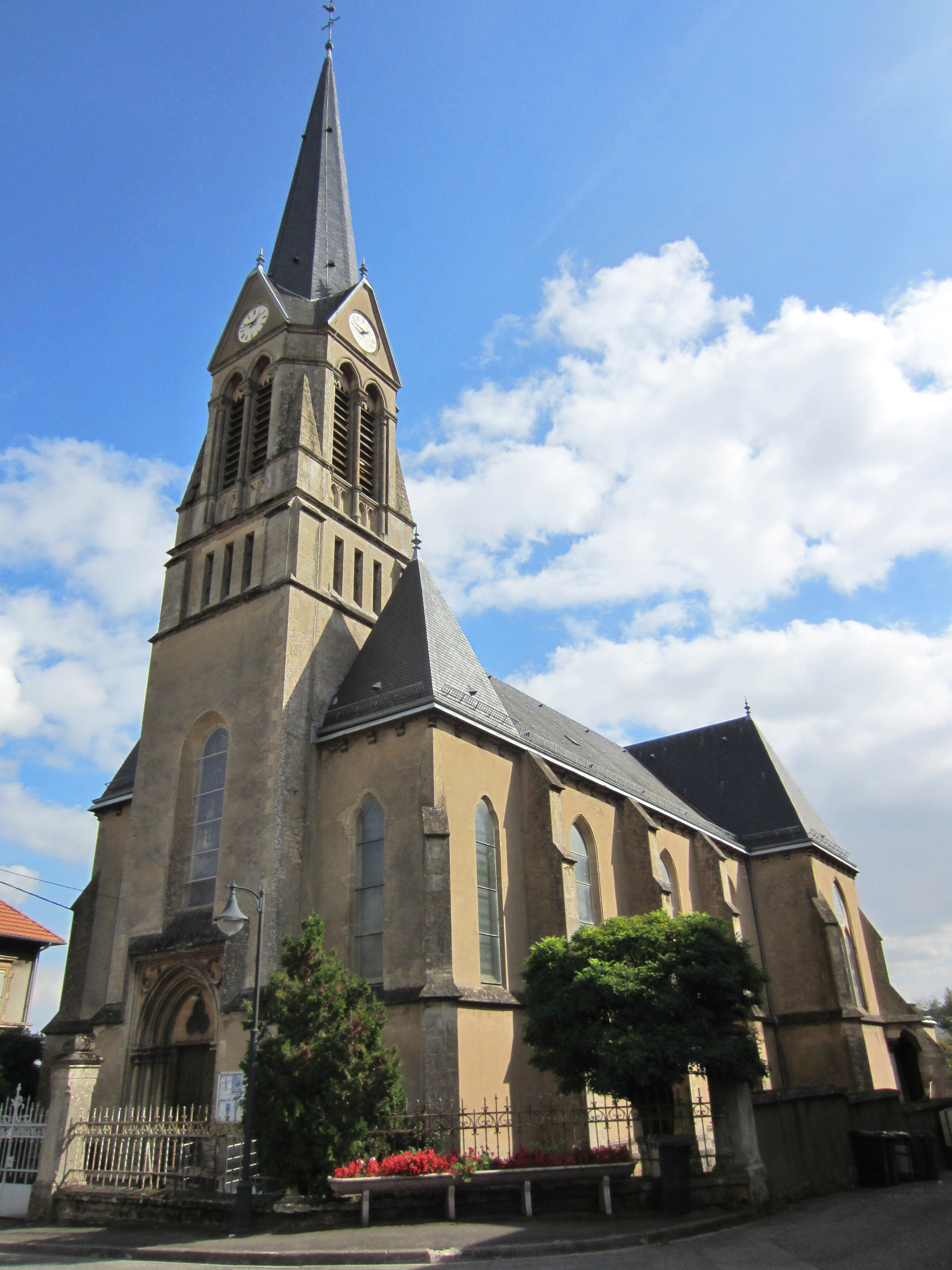
- The church in Rédange

- Coat of arms
- Location of Rédange
- Location within France Location within Grand Est
- Coordinates: 49°29′41″N 5°55′13″E
- Country: France
- Region: Grand Est
- Department: Moselle
- Arrondissement: Thionville
- Canton: Algrange
- Intercommunality: Pays-Haut Val d'Alzette

Government
  - Mayor (2020–2026): Daniel Cimarelli
- Area^{1}: 5.5 km^{2} (2.1 sq mi)
- Elevation: 380 m (1,250 ft)
- Highest elevation: 425 m (1,394 ft)
- Lowest elevation: 299 m (981 ft)
- Population (2023): 1,014
  - Density: 180/km^{2} (480/sq mi)
- Time zone: UTC+01:00 (CET)
  - Summer (DST): UTC+02:00 (CEST)
- INSEE/Postal code: 57565 /57390
- ^{1} French Land Register data, which excludes lakes, ponds, glaciers > 1 km^{2} (0.386 sq mi or 247 acres) and river estuaries.

Rédange (French pronunciation: [ʁedɑ̃ʒ]; German: Redingen; Lorraine Franconian: Réideng) is a commune in the Moselle department in Grand Est in north-eastern France.

== See also ==
- Communes of the Moselle department
