= Lommerange =

- Commune
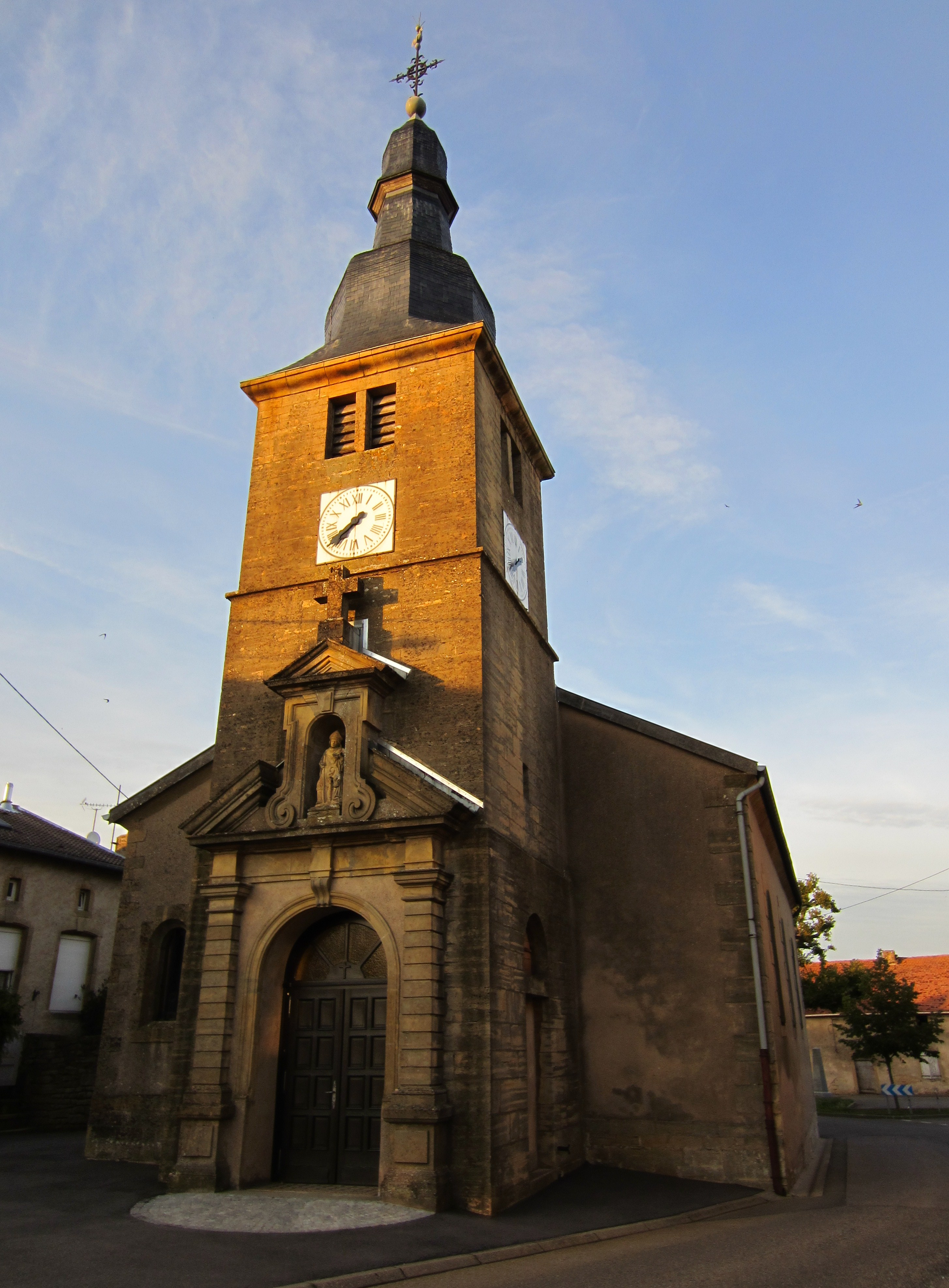
- The church in Lommerange

- Coat of arms
- Location of Lommerange
- Location within France Location within Grand Est
- Coordinates: 49°20′09″N 5°58′08″E
- Country: France
- Region: Grand Est
- Department: Moselle
- Arrondissement: Thionville
- Canton: Algrange
- Intercommunality: CA Portes de France-Thionville

Government
  - Mayor (2020–2026): René André
- Area^{1}: 7.97 km^{2} (3.08 sq mi)
- Elevation: 280 m (920 ft)
- Highest elevation: 327 m (1,073 ft)
- Lowest elevation: 230 m (750 ft)
- Population (2023): 380
  - Density: 48/km^{2} (120/sq mi)
- Demonym: Lommerangeois
- Time zone: UTC+01:00 (CET)
  - Summer (DST): UTC+02:00 (CEST)
- INSEE/Postal code: 57411 /57650
- ^{1} French Land Register data, which excludes lakes, ponds, glaciers > 1 km^{2} (0.386 sq mi or 247 acres) and river estuaries.

Lommerange (French pronunciation: [lɔmʁɑ̃ʒ]; German: Lommeringen; Lorraine Franconian: Lumréngen/Lomréng) is a commune in the Moselle department in Grand Est in north-eastern France.

== See also ==
- Communes of the Moselle department
