= Russange =

- Commune
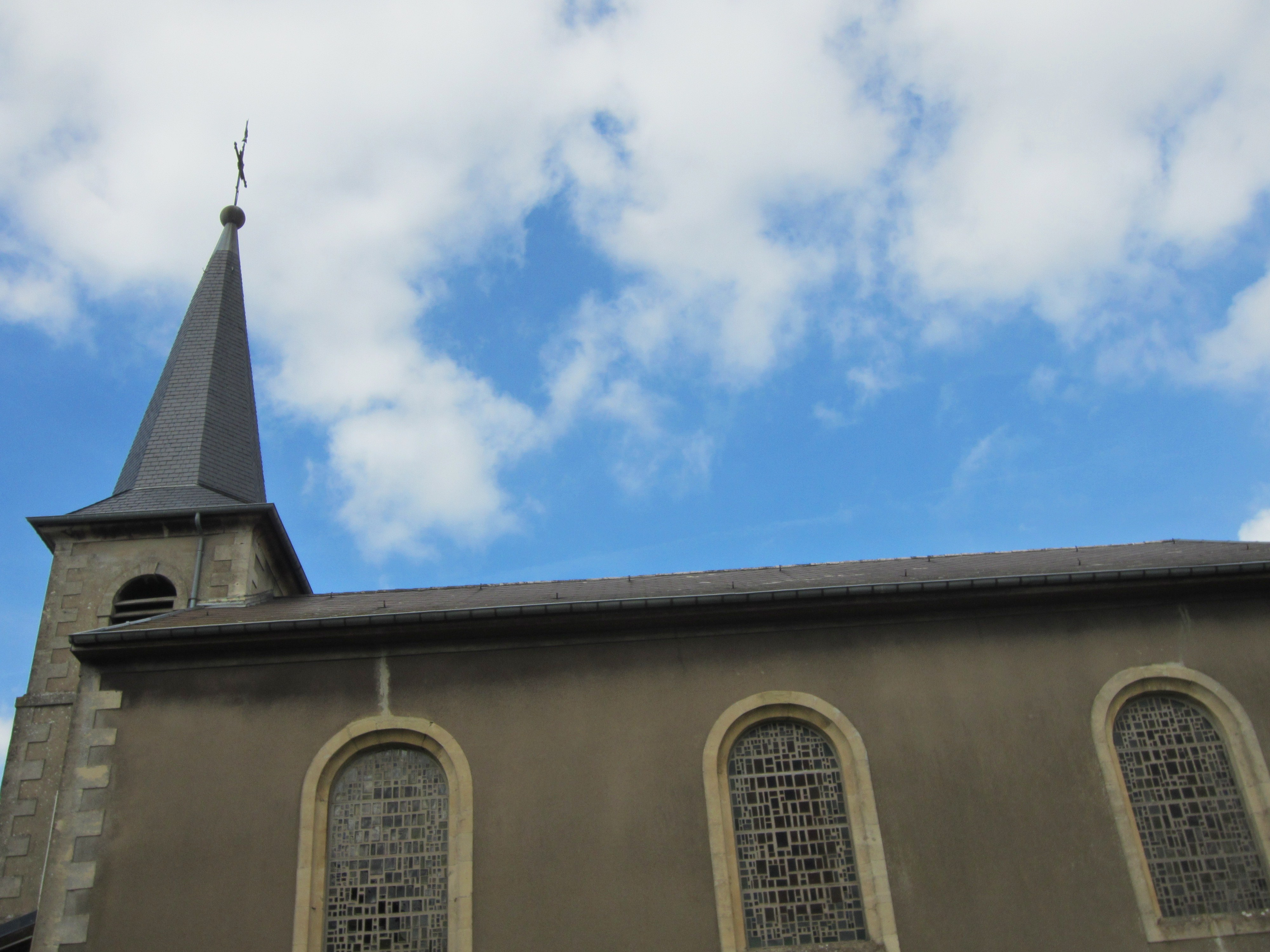
- The church in Russange

- Coat of arms
- Location of Russange
- Location within France Location within Grand Est
- Coordinates: 49°28′54″N 5°57′15″E
- Country: France
- Region: Grand Est
- Department: Moselle
- Arrondissement: Thionville
- Canton: Algrange
- Intercommunality: CC du Pays Haut Val d'Alzette

Government
  - Mayor (2020–2026): Jean-Jacques Bourson
- Area^{1}: 3.46 km^{2} (1.34 sq mi)
- Elevation: 260 m (850 ft)
- Highest elevation: 415 m (1,362 ft)
- Lowest elevation: 294 m (965 ft)
- Population (2023): 1,263
  - Density: 365/km^{2} (945/sq mi)
- Time zone: UTC+01:00 (CET)
  - Summer (DST): UTC+02:00 (CEST)
- INSEE/Postal code: 57603 /57390
- ^{1} French Land Register data, which excludes lakes, ponds, glaciers > 1 km^{2} (0.386 sq mi or 247 acres) and river estuaries.

Russange (French pronunciation: [ʁysɑ̃ʒ]; German: Rüssingen; Luxembourgish: Réisseng; Lorraine Franconian: Réisséng/Réisseng) is a commune in the Moselle department in Grand Est in north-eastern France.

== See also ==
- Communes of the Moselle department
