= Ottange =

- Commune
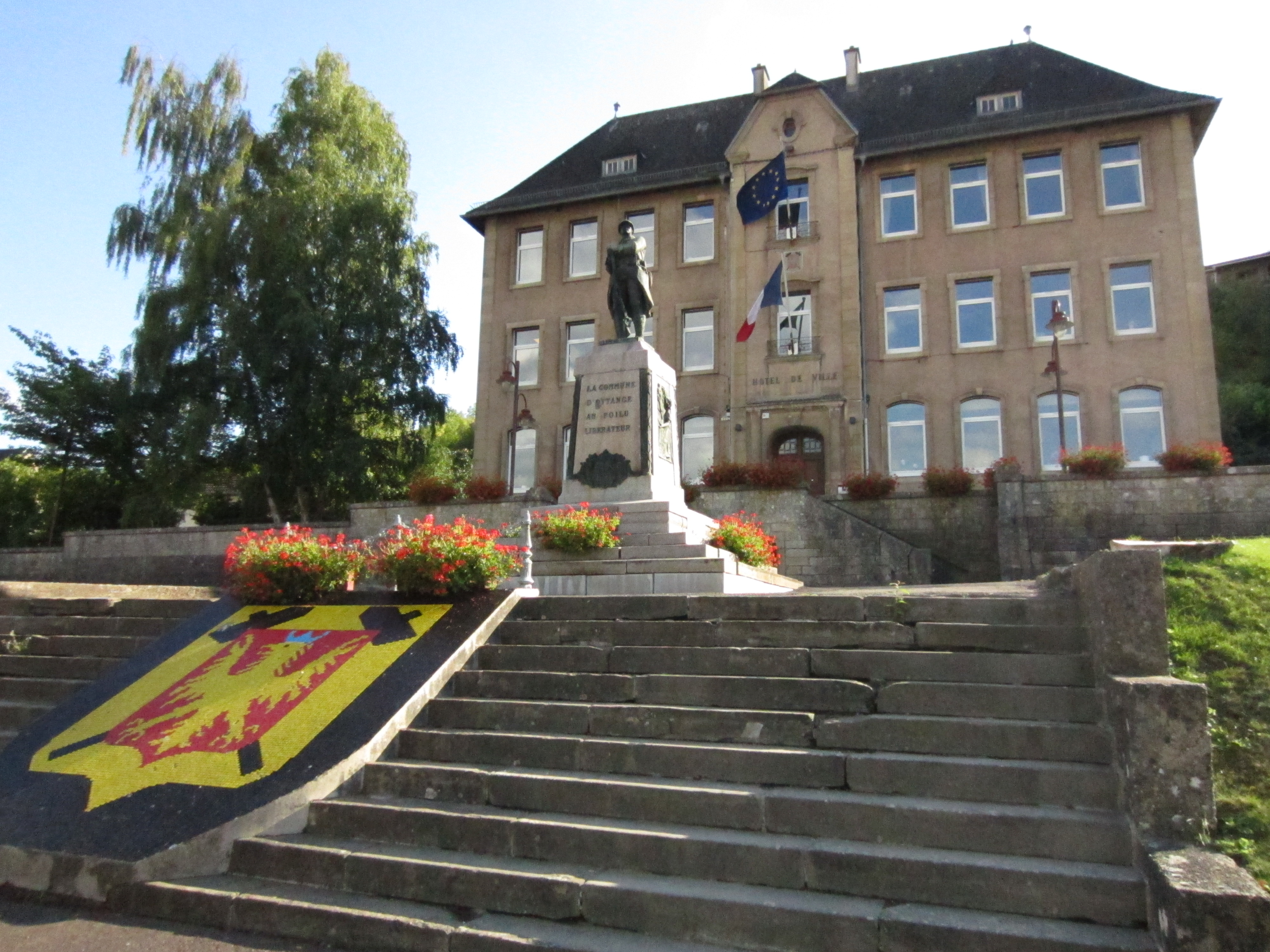
- The town hall in Ottange

- Coat of arms
- Location of Ottange
- Location within France Location within Grand Est
- Coordinates: 49°26′35″N 6°01′09″E
- Country: France
- Region: Grand Est
- Department: Moselle
- Arrondissement: Thionville
- Canton: Algrange
- Intercommunality: CC du Pays Haut Val d'Alzette

Government
  - Mayor (2020–2026): Fabienne Menichetti
- Area^{1}: 15.48 km^{2} (5.98 sq mi)
- Elevation: 315 m (1,033 ft)
- Highest elevation: 428 m (1,404 ft)
- Lowest elevation: 295 m (968 ft)
- Population (2023): 2,960
  - Density: 191/km^{2} (495/sq mi)
- Time zone: UTC+01:00 (CET)
  - Summer (DST): UTC+02:00 (CEST)
- INSEE/Postal code: 57529 /57840
- ^{1} French Land Register data, which excludes lakes, ponds, glaciers > 1 km^{2} (0.386 sq mi or 247 acres) and river estuaries.

Ottange (French pronunciation: [ɔtɑ̃ʒ]; German: Öttingen, Lorraine Franconian: Ëtténg/Otténg) is a commune in the Moselle department in Grand Est in north-eastern France.

== Population ==
Historical population
Year	Pop.	±% p.a.
1968	3,180	—
1975	2,852	−1.54%
1982	2,621	−1.20%
1990	2,482	−0.68%
1999	2,590	+0.47%
2007	2,685	+0.45%
2012	2,705	+0.15%
2017	3,043	+2.38%
2023	2,960	−0.46%
Source: INSEE

== See also ==
- Communes of the Moselle department
