= Illange =

- Commune
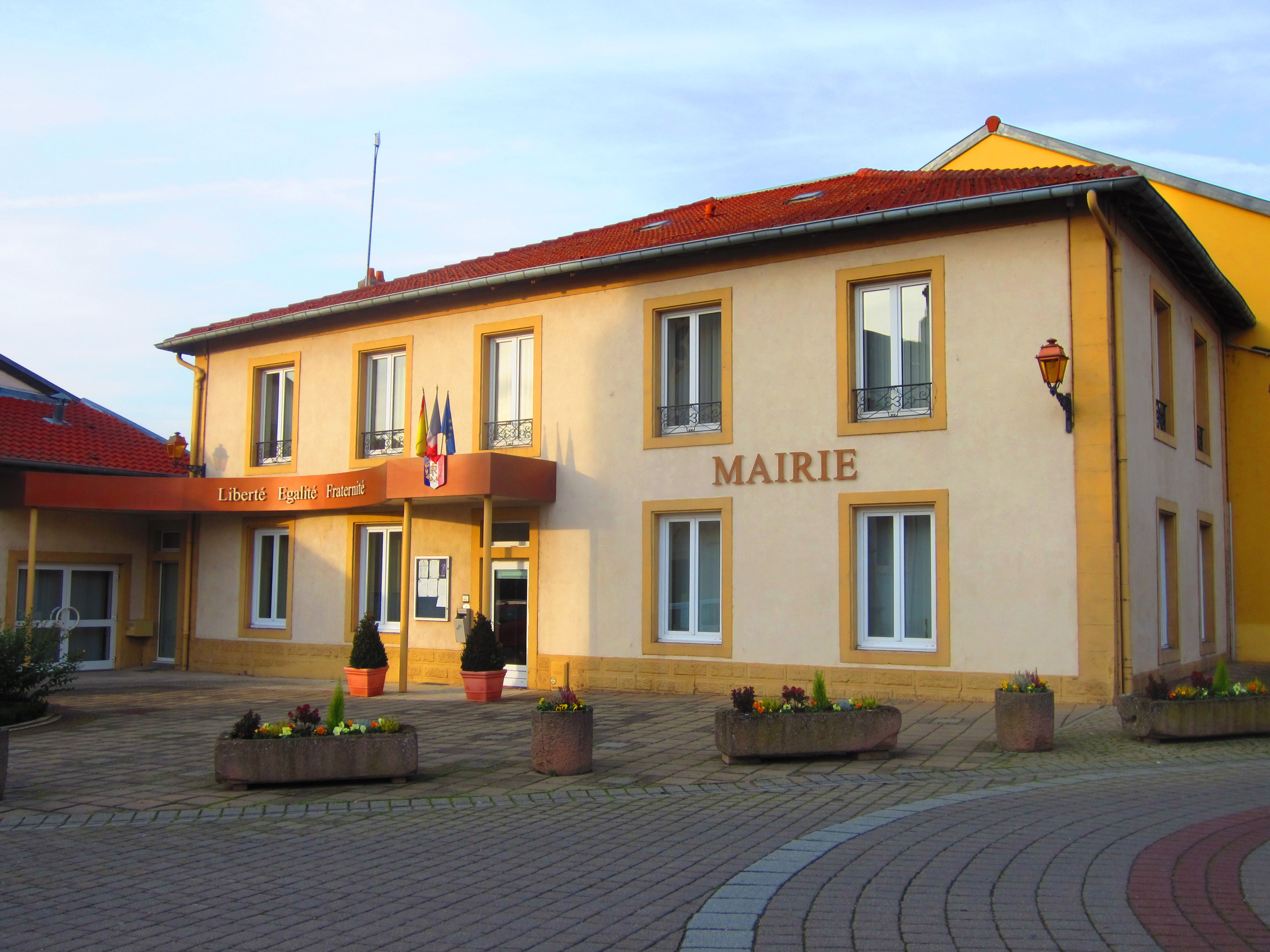
- The town hall in Illange

- Coat of arms
- Location of Illange
- Location within France Location within Grand Est
- Coordinates: 49°19′35″N 6°10′44″E
- Country: France
- Region: Grand Est
- Department: Moselle
- Arrondissement: Thionville
- Canton: Yutz
- Intercommunality: CA Portes de France-Thionville

Government
  - Mayor (2020–2026): Marc Lucchini
- Area^{1}: 5.65 km^{2} (2.18 sq mi)
- Elevation: 178 m (584 ft)
- Highest elevation: 221 m (725 ft)
- Lowest elevation: 155 m (509 ft)
- Population (2023): 1,770
  - Density: 313/km^{2} (811/sq mi)
- Time zone: UTC+01:00 (CET)
  - Summer (DST): UTC+02:00 (CEST)
- INSEE/Postal code: 57343 /57970
- ^{1} French Land Register data, which excludes lakes, ponds, glaciers > 1 km^{2} (0.386 sq mi or 247 acres) and river estuaries.

Illange (French pronunciation: [ilɑ̃ʒ]; German: Illingen; Lorraine Franconian: Illéng/Illéngen) is a commune in the Moselle department in Grand Est in north-eastern France. It adjoins Thionville.

The Fort d'Illange, a pre–World War I German fortification, is located just to the north of the town, and is operated as an open-air museum.

== See also ==
- Communes of the Moselle department
