= Algrange =

Commune in Moselle, France

Algrange Oolgréngen / Algréngen (Lorraine Franconian)
- Commune
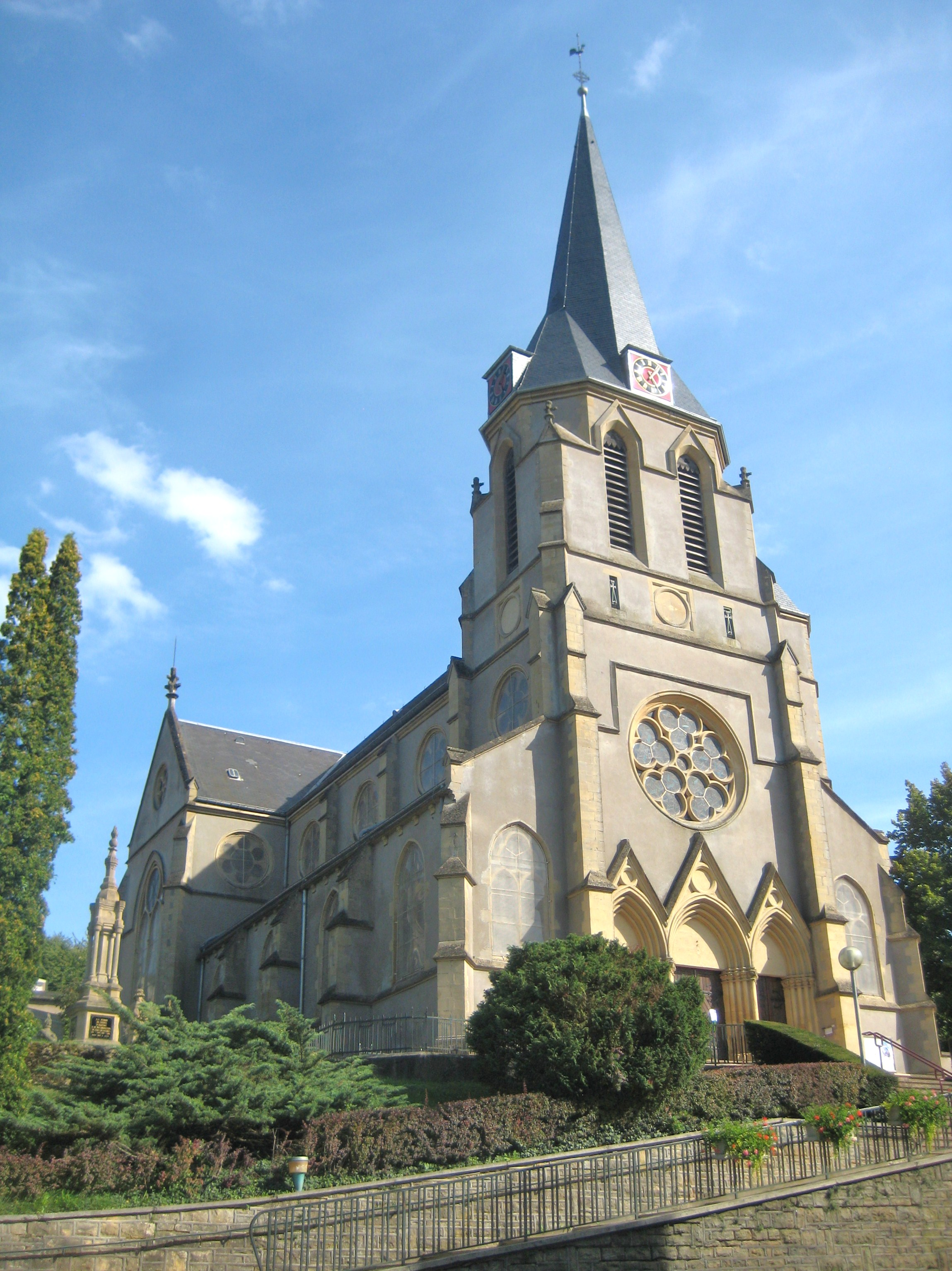
- The church in Algrange

- Coat of arms
- Location of Algrange
- Location within France Location within Grand Est
- Coordinates: 49°21′36″N 6°02′56″E
- Country: France
- Region: Grand Est
- Department: Moselle
- Arrondissement: Thionville
- Canton: Algrange
- Intercommunality: CA Val de Fensch

Government
  - Mayor (2020–2026): Patrick Peron
- Area^{1}: 6.96 km^{2} (2.69 sq mi)
- Elevation: 300 m (980 ft)
- Highest elevation: 405 m (1,329 ft)
- Lowest elevation: 221 m (725 ft)
- Population (2023): 5,802
  - Density: 834/km^{2} (2,160/sq mi)
- Time zone: UTC+01:00 (CET)
  - Summer (DST): UTC+02:00 (CEST)
- INSEE/Postal code: 57012 /57440
- ^{1} French Land Register data, which excludes lakes, ponds, glaciers > 1 km^{2} (0.386 sq mi or 247 acres) and river estuaries.

Algrange (French pronunciation: [algʁɑ̃ʒ]; Lorraine Franconian: Oolgréngen or Algréngen; German: Algringen) is a commune in the Moselle department in Grand Est in northeastern France. They have an association football team, AS Algrange, playing in the regional divisions, who reached the 8th round of the 2000–01 Coupe de France, losing on penalties to Levallois SC.

== Population ==
Historical population
Year	Pop.	±% p.a.
1968	8,658	—
1975	7,658	−1.74%
1982	6,767	−1.75%
1990	6,325	−0.84%
1999	6,198	−0.23%
2007	6,343	+0.29%
2012	6,381	+0.12%
2017	6,144	−0.75%
2023	5,802	−0.95%
Source: INSEE

== Personalities ==
- Hervé Laborne (born 7 October 1946), electrical engineer and President of university.
- Adolf Wagner (1 October 1890 – 12 April 1944): Gauleiter of the Gau München-Oberbayern.
- Josef Wagner (12 January 1899 – 22 April or 2 May 1945): Gauleiter of the Gau of Westphalia-South.

== See also ==
- Communes of the Moselle department
