= Neufchef =

- Commune
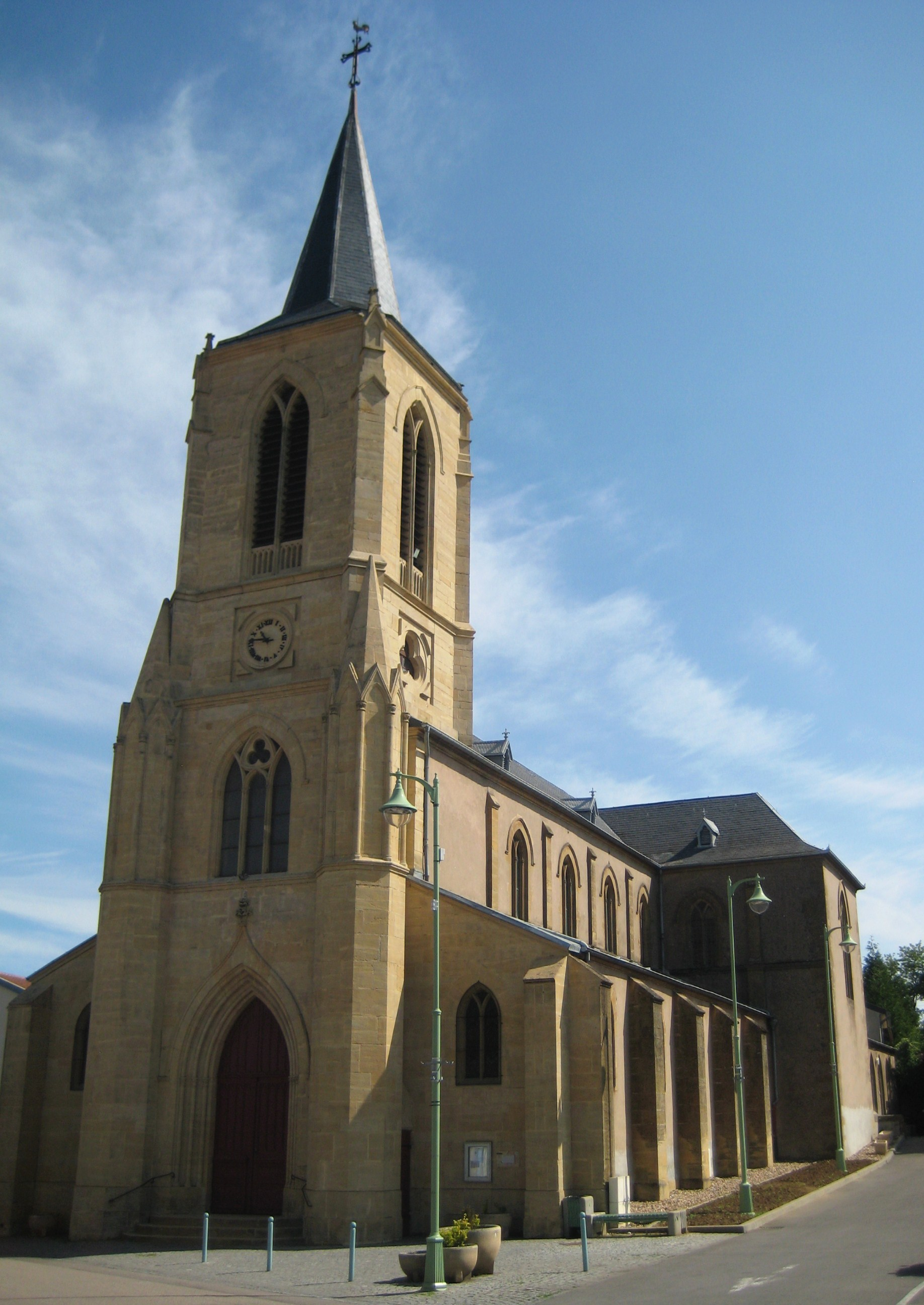
- The church in Neufchef

- Coat of arms
- Location of Neufchef
- Location within France Location within Grand Est
- Coordinates: 49°19′03″N 6°01′27″E
- Country: France
- Region: Grand Est
- Department: Moselle
- Arrondissement: Thionville
- Canton: Algrange
- Intercommunality: CA du Val de Fensch

Government
  - Mayor (2020–2026): Carla Lambour
- Area^{1}: 16.72 km^{2} (6.46 sq mi)
- Elevation: 310 m (1,020 ft)
- Highest elevation: 365 m (1,198 ft)
- Lowest elevation: 205 m (673 ft)
- Population (2023): 2,650
  - Density: 158/km^{2} (410/sq mi)
- Time zone: UTC+01:00 (CET)
  - Summer (DST): UTC+02:00 (CEST)
- INSEE/Postal code: 57498 /57700
- ^{1} French Land Register data, which excludes lakes, ponds, glaciers > 1 km^{2} (0.386 sq mi or 247 acres) and river estuaries.

Neufchef (French pronunciation: [nœfʃɛf]; German: Neunhäuser) is a commune in the Moselle department in Grand Est in north-eastern France. Its area is 16.72 km².

== Population ==
Historical population
Year	Pop.	±% p.a.
1968	2,988	—
1975	3,275	+1.32%
1982	2,965	−1.41%
1990	2,560	−1.82%
1999	2,521	−0.17%
2007	2,541	+0.10%
2012	2,527	−0.11%
2017	2,580	+0.42%
2023	2,650	+0.45%
Source: INSEE

== See also ==
- Communes of the Moselle department
