= Canton of Algrange =

Coordinates: 49.36°N 6.05°E

The canton of Algrange is an administrative division of the Moselle department, northeastern France. Its borders were modified at the French canton reorganisation which came into effect in March 2015. Its seat is in Algrange.

It consists of the following communes:

1. Algrange
2. Angevillers
3. Audun-le-Tiche
4. Aumetz
5. Boulange
6. Fontoy
7. Havange
8. Knutange
9. Lommerange
10. Neufchef
11. Nilvange
12. Ottange
13. Rédange
14. Rochonvillers
15. Russange
16. Tressange
