= Audun-le-Tiche =

- Commune
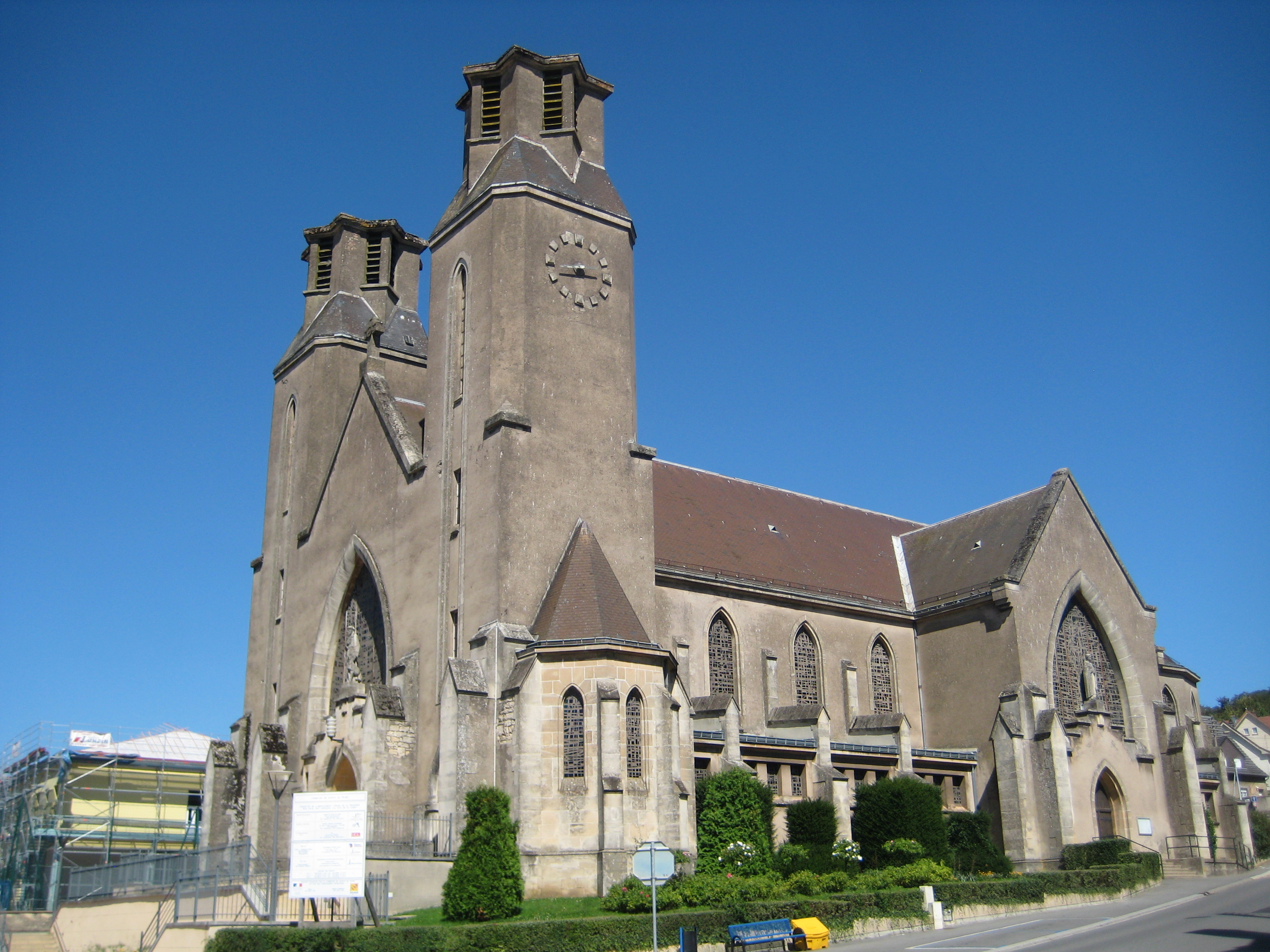
- The church in Audun-le-Tiche

- Coat of arms
- Location of Audun-le-Tiche
- Location within France Location within Grand Est
- Coordinates: 49°28′27″N 5°57′30″E
- Country: France
- Region: Grand Est
- Department: Moselle
- Arrondissement: Thionville
- Canton: Algrange
- Intercommunality: CC Pays Haut Val Alzette

Government
  - Mayor (2020–2026): Viviane Fattorelli
- Area^{1}: 15.43 km^{2} (5.96 sq mi)
- Highest elevation: 452 m (1,483 ft)
- Lowest elevation: 294 m (965 ft)
- Population (2023): 7,356
  - Density: 476.7/km^{2} (1,235/sq mi)
- Time zone: UTC+01:00 (CET)
  - Summer (DST): UTC+02:00 (CEST)
- INSEE/Postal code: 57038 /57390
- ^{1} French Land Register data, which excludes lakes, ponds, glaciers > 1 km^{2} (0.386 sq mi or 247 acres) and river estuaries.

Audun-le-Tiche (French pronunciation: [odɛ̃ lə tiʃ]; German: Deutsch-Oth; Luxembourgish: Däitsch-Oth) is a commune in the Moselle department in Grand Est in northeastern France.

== Location and rail links ==
Audun-le-Tiche is located adjacent to Esch-sur-Alzette, on the border with Luxembourg, and close to the borders of Germany, and Belgium.

Audun-le-Tiche is served by a railway station that is only served by the Chemins de Fer Luxembourgeois, on whose Line 60 it is located.

== History ==
The name Audun comes from Awedeux, as a phonetical evolution of Latin Aquaeducta, and le Tiche is an evolution of Thieux, meaning "the German" — cf. Deutsch. The corresponding town Audun-le-Roman lies in the former Romance, or Latin-speaking area, where Audun-le-Tiche is the other side of the language border, in the Germanic-speaking area. Nowadays, these two cities are respectively named Deutsch-Oth and Welsch-Oth in German.

The town was long associated with the mining industry. The history of mining in Audun-le-Tiche and its decline has been described in the writings of Aurélie Filippetti. The Villeroy & Boch ceramic manufacturing company was founded in 1748 in Audun by François Boch. The company headquarter later moved to nearby Luxembourg, and in 1801 to Mettlach, Germany.

Audun sister town is Gualdo Tadino in Italy, from which immigrants came working in mining industry during the 19th century.

== Population ==
Historical population

Year	Pop.	±% p.a.
1793	516	—
1800	401	−3.54%
1806	544	+5.21%
1821	592	+0.57%
1836	723	+1.34%
1841	834	+2.90%
1861	1,008	+0.95%
1866	971	−0.75%
1871	1,050	+1.58%
1875	1,081	+0.73%
1880	1,261	+3.13%
1885	1,708	+6.26%
1890	1,798	+1.03%
1895	2,726	+8.68%
1900	4,780	+11.89%
1905	5,231	+1.82%
1910	6,293	+3.77%

Year	Pop.	±% p.a.
1921	4,441	−3.12%
1926	6,101	+6.56%
1931	6,577	+1.51%
1936	6,292	−0.88%
1946	5,793	−0.82%
1954	7,103	+2.58%
1962	8,522	+2.30%
1968	7,698	−1.68%
1975	6,831	−1.69%
1982	6,391	−0.95%
1990	5,959	−0.87%
1999	5,757	−0.38%
2007	5,975	+0.47%
2012	6,438	+1.50%
2017	6,846	+1.24%
2023	7,356	+1.20%

Source: EHESS and INSEE (1968-2023)

== See also ==
- Communes of the Moselle department
