= Ranguevaux =

- Commune
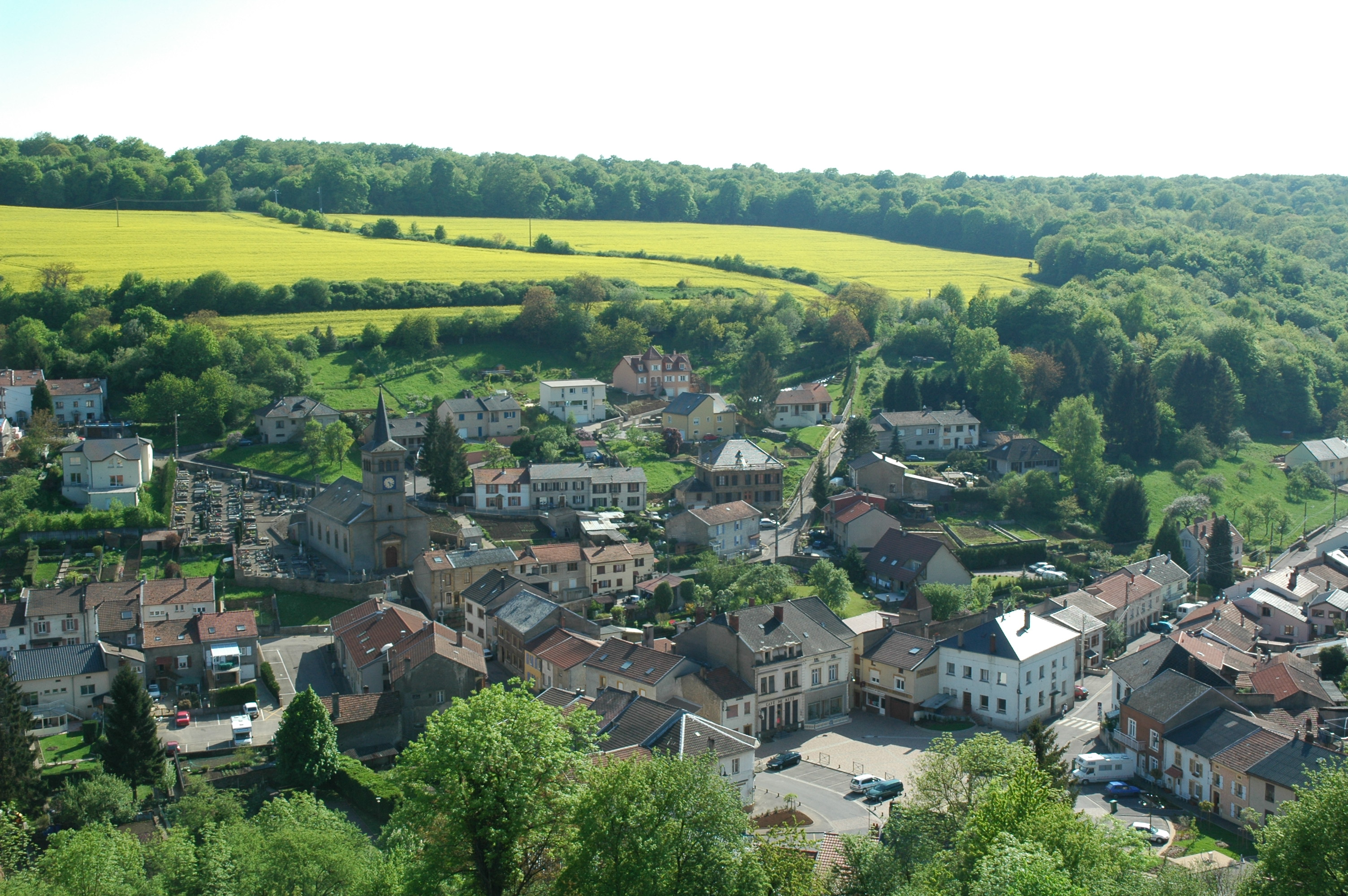
- A general view of Ranguevaux

- Coat of arms
- Location of Ranguevaux
- Location within France Location within Grand Est
- Coordinates: 49°17′53″N 6°03′22″E
- Country: France
- Region: Grand Est
- Department: Moselle
- Arrondissement: Thionville
- Canton: Hayange
- Intercommunality: CA Val de Fensch

Government
  - Mayor (2020–2026): Philippe Greiner
- Area^{1}: 10.17 km^{2} (3.93 sq mi)
- Elevation: 189 m (620 ft)
- Highest elevation: 356 m (1,168 ft)
- Lowest elevation: 205 m (673 ft)
- Population (2023): 907
  - Density: 89.2/km^{2} (231/sq mi)
- Time zone: UTC+01:00 (CET)
  - Summer (DST): UTC+02:00 (CEST)
- INSEE/Postal code: 57562 /57700
- ^{1} French Land Register data, which excludes lakes, ponds, glaciers > 1 km^{2} (0.386 sq mi or 247 acres) and river estuaries.

Ranguevaux (French pronunciation: [ʁɑ̃ɡvo]; German: Rangwall) is a commune in the Moselle department in Grand Est in north-eastern France.

== See also ==
- Communes of the Moselle department
