= Rochonvillers =

- Commune
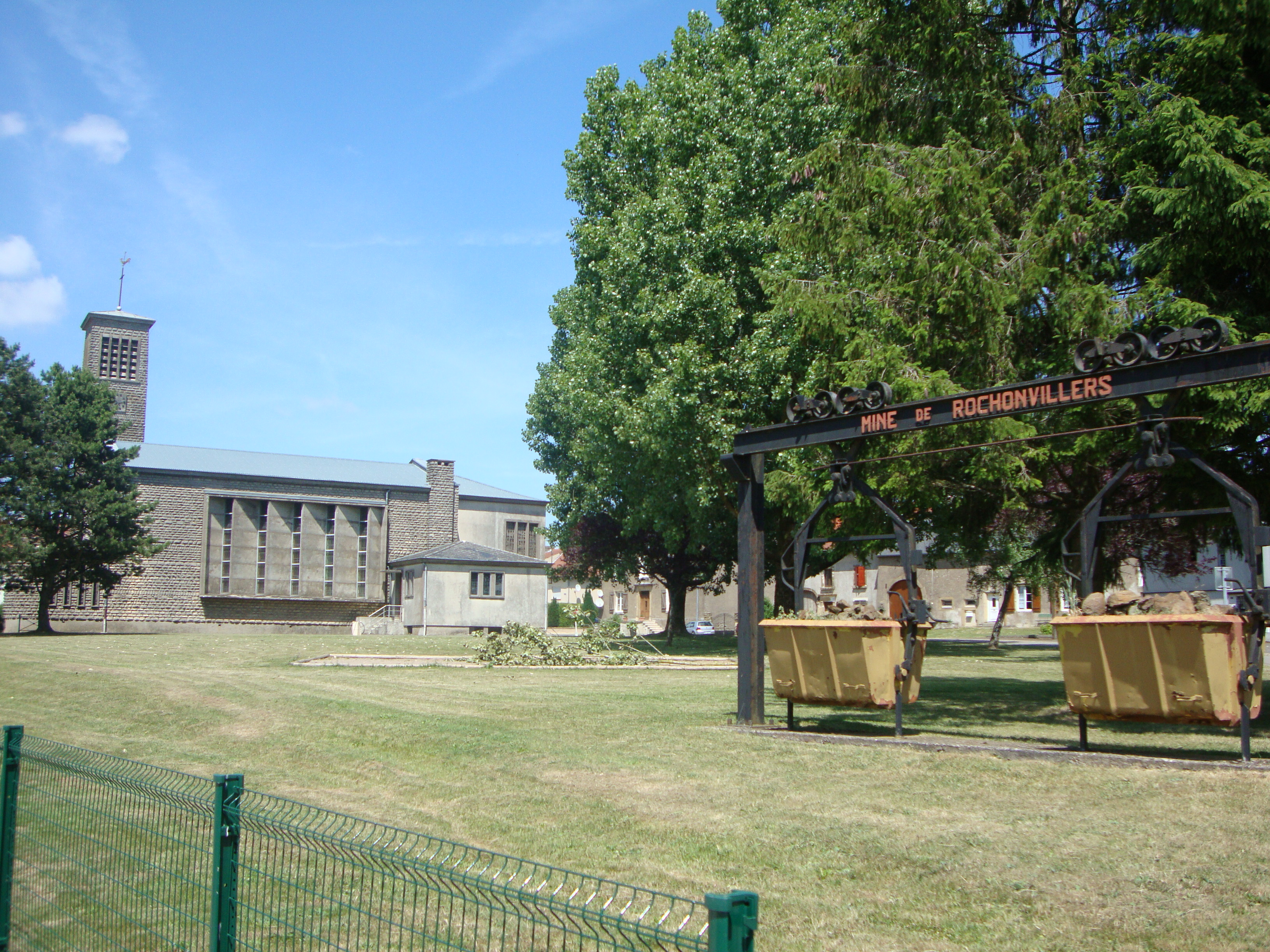
- The mine of Rochonvillers

- Coat of arms
- Location of Rochonvillers
- Location within France Location within Grand Est
- Coordinates: 49°24′53″N 6°01′44″E
- Country: France
- Region: Grand Est
- Department: Moselle
- Arrondissement: Thionville
- Canton: Algrange
- Intercommunality: CA Portes de France-Thionville

Government
  - Mayor (2020–2026): Angèle Kaspar-Cotrupi
- Area^{1}: 5.64 km^{2} (2.18 sq mi)
- Elevation: 400 m (1,300 ft)
- Highest elevation: 412 m (1,352 ft)
- Lowest elevation: 321 m (1,053 ft)
- Population (2023): 215
  - Density: 38.1/km^{2} (98.7/sq mi)
- Time zone: UTC+01:00 (CET)
  - Summer (DST): UTC+02:00 (CEST)
- INSEE/Postal code: 57586 /57840
- ^{1} French Land Register data, which excludes lakes, ponds, glaciers > 1 km^{2} (0.386 sq mi or 247 acres) and river estuaries.

Rochonvillers (French pronunciation: [ʁɔʃɔ̃vile]; German: Ruxweiler; Luxembourgish: Rucksler/Rucksweller) is a commune in the Moselle department in Grand Est in north-eastern France.

== See also ==
- Communes of the Moselle department
- Ouvrage Rochonvillers, a nearby Maginot Line fortification
