= Nilvange =

- Commune
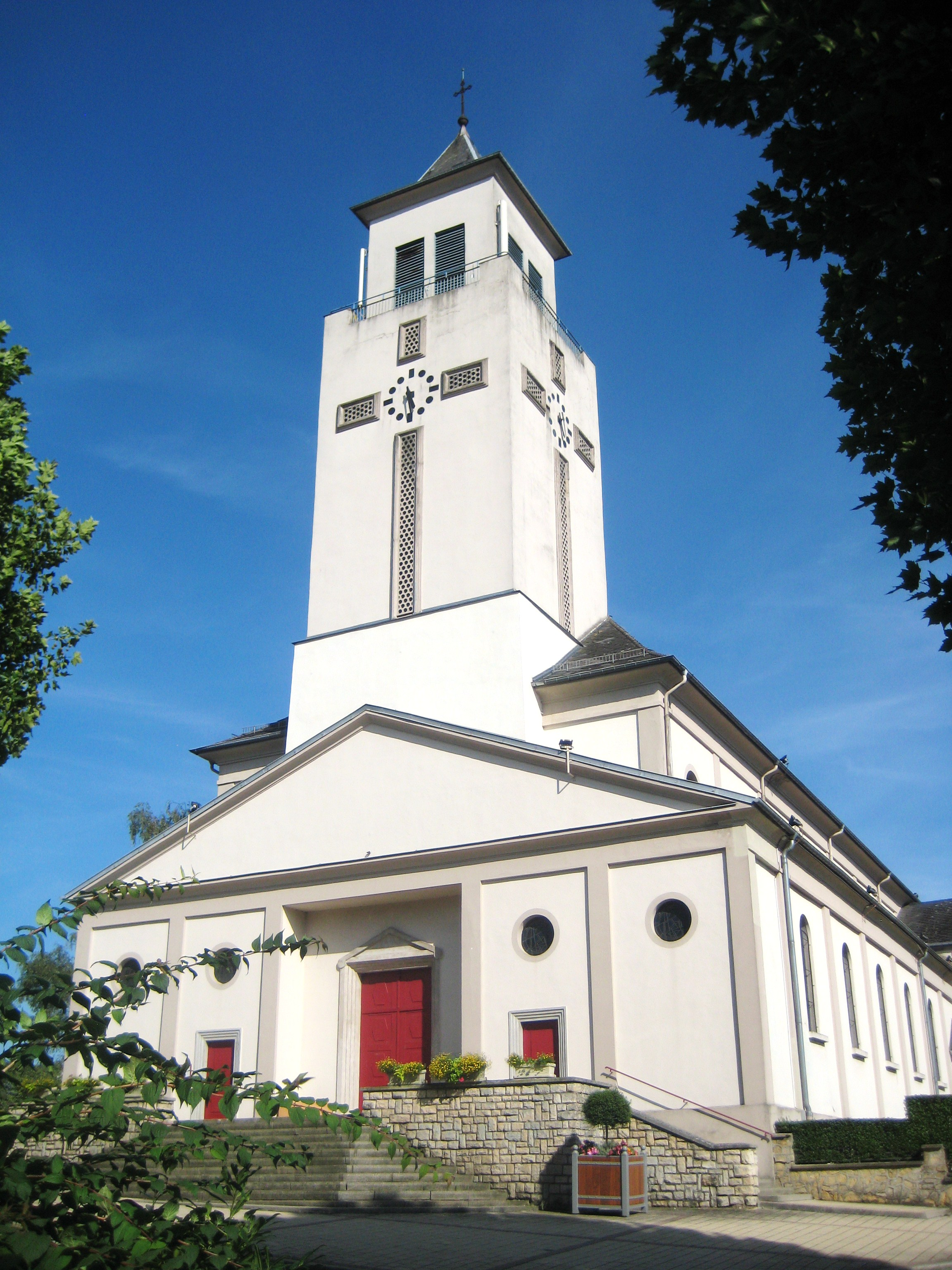
- The church in Nilvange

- Coat of arms
- Location of Nilvange
- Location within France Location within Grand Est
- Coordinates: 49°20′34″N 6°03′03″E
- Country: France
- Region: Grand Est
- Department: Moselle
- Arrondissement: Thionville
- Canton: Algrange
- Intercommunality: CA du Val de Fensch

Government
  - Mayor (2020–2026): Alexandra Rebstock Pinna
- Area^{1}: 2.81 km^{2} (1.08 sq mi)
- Elevation: 225 m (738 ft)
- Highest elevation: 376 m (1,234 ft)
- Lowest elevation: 193 m (633 ft)
- Population (2023): 4,341
  - Density: 1,540/km^{2} (4,000/sq mi)
- Time zone: UTC+01:00 (CET)
  - Summer (DST): UTC+02:00 (CEST)
- INSEE/Postal code: 57508 /57240
- ^{1} French Land Register data, which excludes lakes, ponds, glaciers > 1 km^{2} (0.386 sq mi or 247 acres) and river estuaries.

Nilvange (French pronunciation: [nilvɑ̃ʒ]; German: Nilvingen) is a commune in the Moselle department in Grand Est in north-eastern France.

== Population ==
Historical population
Year	Pop.	±% p.a.
1968	8,136	—
1975	7,018	−2.09%
1982	5,944	−2.34%
1990	5,583	−0.78%
1999	5,286	−0.61%
2007	4,989	−0.72%
2012	4,896	−0.38%
2017	4,725	−0.71%
2023	4,341	−1.40%
Source: INSEE

== See also ==
- Communes of the Moselle department
