= Aumetz =

- Commune
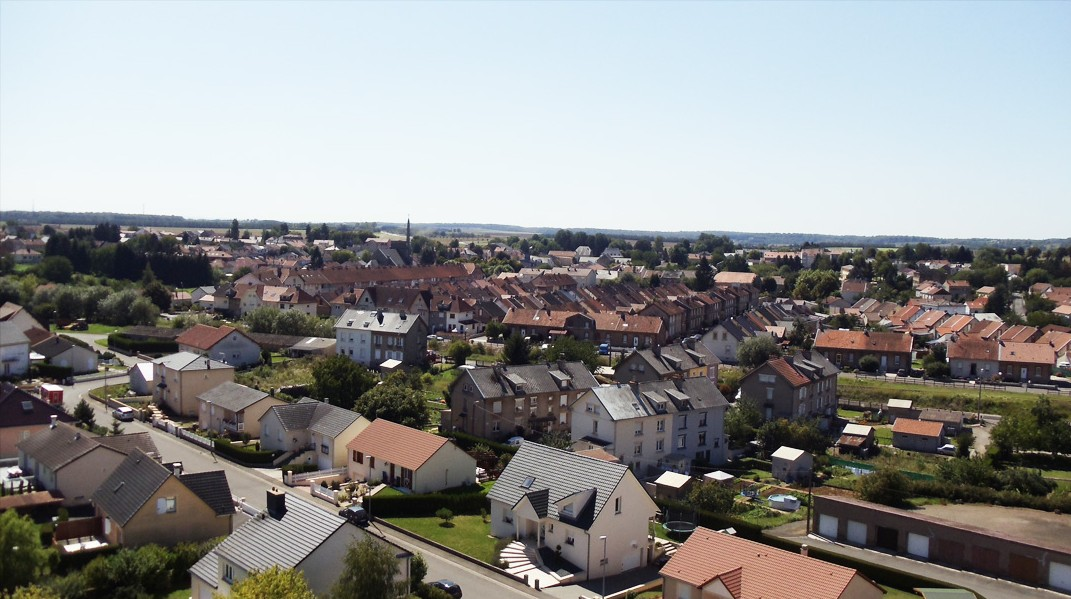
- A general view of Aumetz

- Coat of arms
- Location of Aumetz
- Location within France Location within Grand Est
- Coordinates: 49°25′07″N 5°56′43″E
- Country: France
- Region: Grand Est
- Department: Moselle
- Arrondissement: Thionville
- Canton: Algrange
- Intercommunality: CC Pays Haut Val Alzette

Government
  - Mayor (2020–2026): Gilles Destremont
- Area^{1}: 10.35 km^{2} (4.00 sq mi)
- Elevation: 385 m (1,263 ft)
- Highest elevation: 408 m (1,339 ft)
- Lowest elevation: 349 m (1,145 ft)
- Population (2023): 2,418
  - Density: 233.6/km^{2} (605.1/sq mi)
- Time zone: UTC+01:00 (CET)
  - Summer (DST): UTC+02:00 (CEST)
- INSEE/Postal code: 57041 /57710
- ^{1} French Land Register data, which excludes lakes, ponds, glaciers > 1 km^{2} (0.386 sq mi or 247 acres) and river estuaries.

Aumetz (French pronunciation: [omɛs]) is a commune in the Moselle department in Grand Est in northeastern France.

== Population ==
Historical population
Year	Pop.	±% p.a.
1968	2,465	—
1975	2,375	−0.53%
1982	2,183	−1.20%
1990	2,161	−0.13%
1999	2,225	+0.32%
2007	2,252	+0.15%
2012	2,310	+0.51%
2017	2,319	+0.08%
2023	2,418	+0.70%
Source: INSEE

== See also ==
- Communes of the Moselle department
