= Boulange =

Commune in France

- Commune
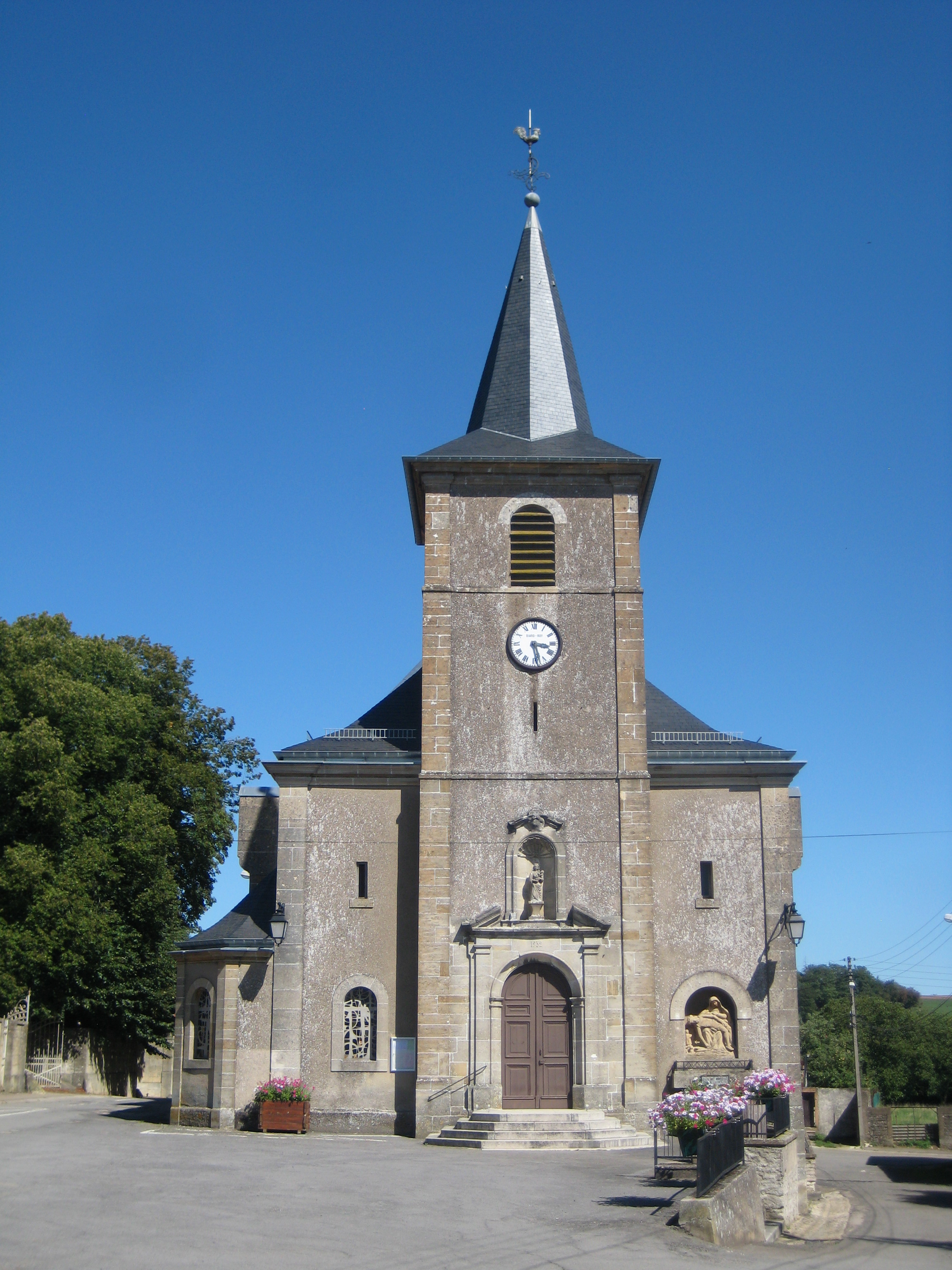
- The church in Boulange

- Coat of arms
- Location of Boulange
- Location within France Location within Grand Est
- Coordinates: 49°22′57″N 5°57′12″E
- Country: France
- Region: Grand Est
- Department: Moselle
- Arrondissement: Thionville
- Canton: Algrange
- Intercommunality: Pays-Haut Val d'Alzette

Government
  - Mayor (2020–2026): Antoine Falchi
- Area^{1}: 12.78 km^{2} (4.93 sq mi)
- Elevation: 286 m (938 ft)
- Highest elevation: 384 m (1,260 ft)
- Lowest elevation: 285 m (935 ft)
- Population (2023): 2,427
  - Density: 189.9/km^{2} (491.9/sq mi)
- Time zone: UTC+01:00 (CET)
  - Summer (DST): UTC+02:00 (CEST)
- INSEE/Postal code: 57096 /57655
- ^{1} French Land Register data, which excludes lakes, ponds, glaciers > 1 km^{2} (0.386 sq mi or 247 acres) and river estuaries.

Boulange (French pronunciation: [bulɑ̃ʒ]; German: Bollingen) is a commune in the Moselle department in Grand Est in northeastern France.

== Population ==
Historical population
Year	Pop.	±% p.a.
1968	2,196	—
1975	1,941	−1.75%
1982	1,839	−0.77%
1990	1,757	−0.57%
1999	1,776	+0.12%
2007	2,236	+2.92%
2012	2,445	+1.80%
2017	2,494	+0.40%
2023	2,427	−0.45%
Source: INSEE

== See also ==
- Communes of the Moselle department
