= Angevillers =

- Commune
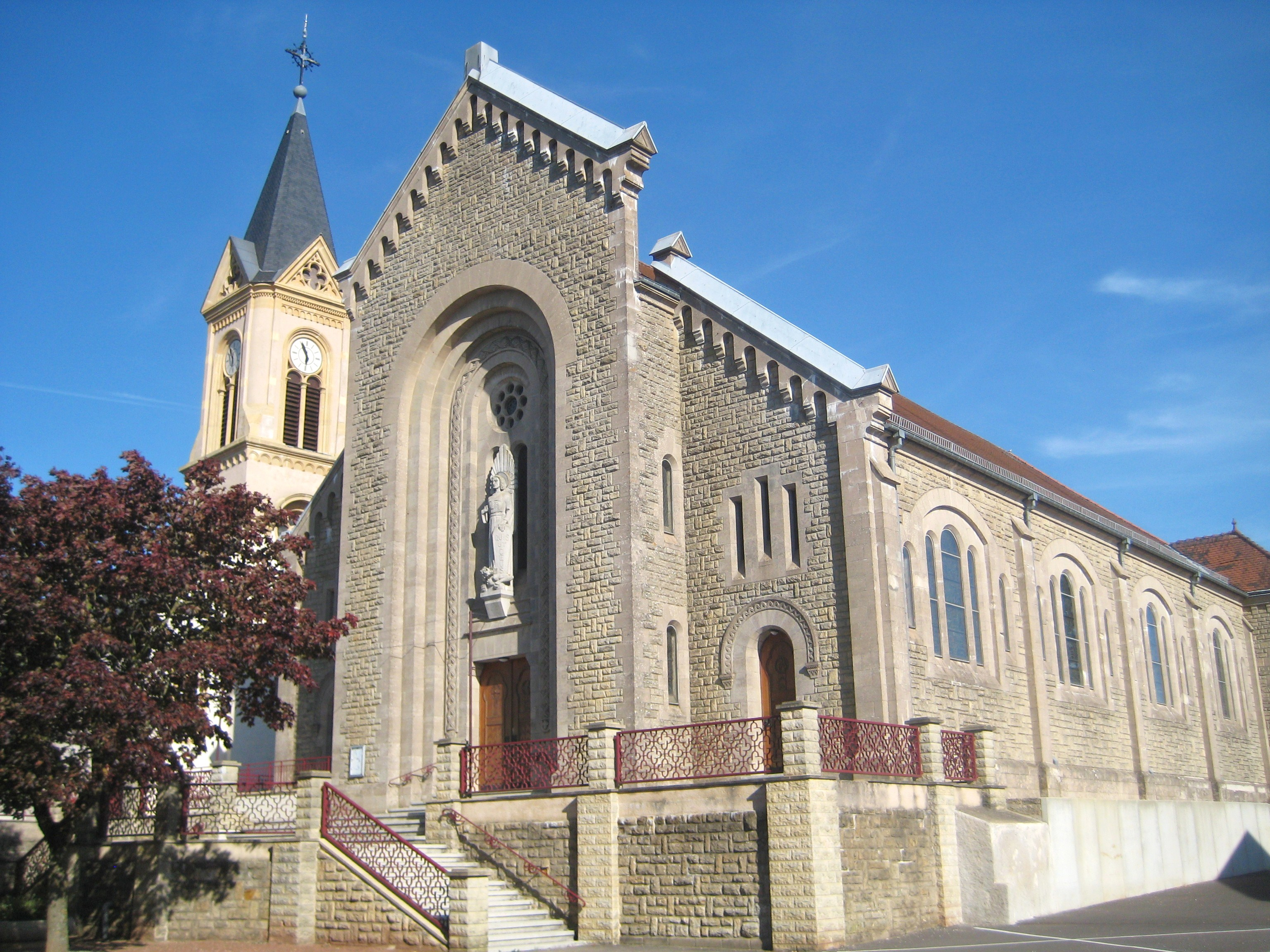
- The church in Angevillers

- Coat of arms
- Location of Angevillers
- Location within France Location within Grand Est
- Coordinates: 49°23′19″N 6°02′36″E
- Country: France
- Region: Grand Est
- Department: Moselle
- Arrondissement: Thionville
- Canton: Algrange
- Intercommunality: CA Portes de France-Thionville

Government
  - Mayor (2020–2026): Jean-Marie Colin
- Area^{1}: 8.71 km^{2} (3.36 sq mi)
- Elevation: 363 m (1,191 ft)
- Highest elevation: 418 m (1,371 ft)
- Lowest elevation: 315 m (1,033 ft)
- Population (2023): 1,404
  - Density: 161/km^{2} (417/sq mi)
- Time zone: UTC+01:00 (CET)
  - Summer (DST): UTC+02:00 (CEST)
- INSEE/Postal code: 57022 /57440
- ^{1} French Land Register data, which excludes lakes, ponds, glaciers > 1 km^{2} (0.386 sq mi or 247 acres) and river estuaries.

Angevillers (French pronunciation: [ɑ̃ʒvile]; German: Arsweiler; Lorraine Franconian Aasler) is a commune in the Moselle department in Grand Est in northeastern France.

== Population ==
Historical population
Year	Pop.	±% p.a.
1968	1,397	—
1975	1,441	+0.44%
1982	1,284	−1.63%
1990	1,175	−1.10%
1999	1,185	+0.09%
2007	1,273	+0.90%
2012	1,247	−0.41%
2017	1,253	+0.10%
2023	1,404	+1.91%
Source: INSEE

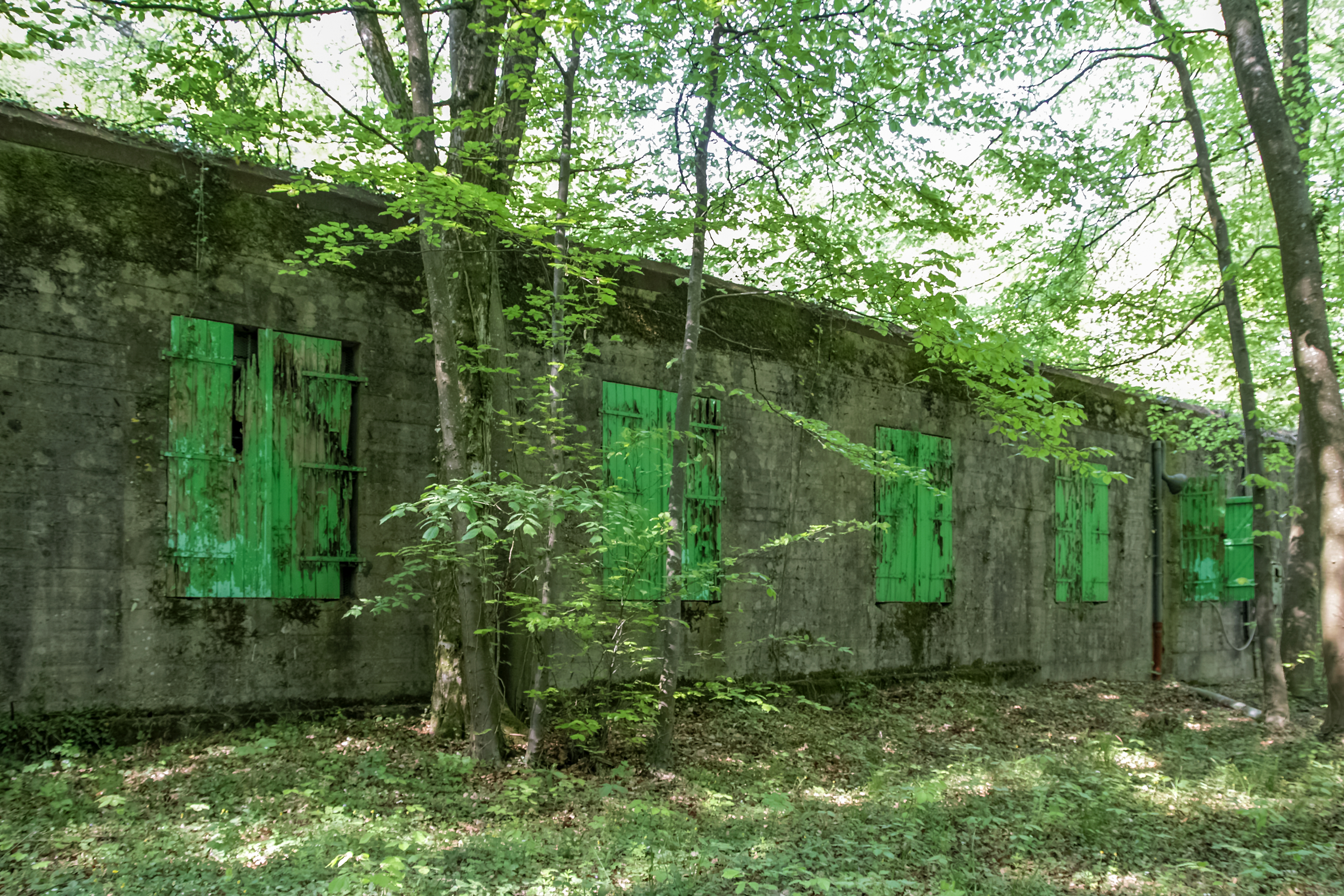
Former Hitler's HQ in the nearby forest

== See also ==
- Communes of the Moselle department
- Ouvrage Rochonvillers, a Maginot Line fortification
