= Fontoy =

- Commune
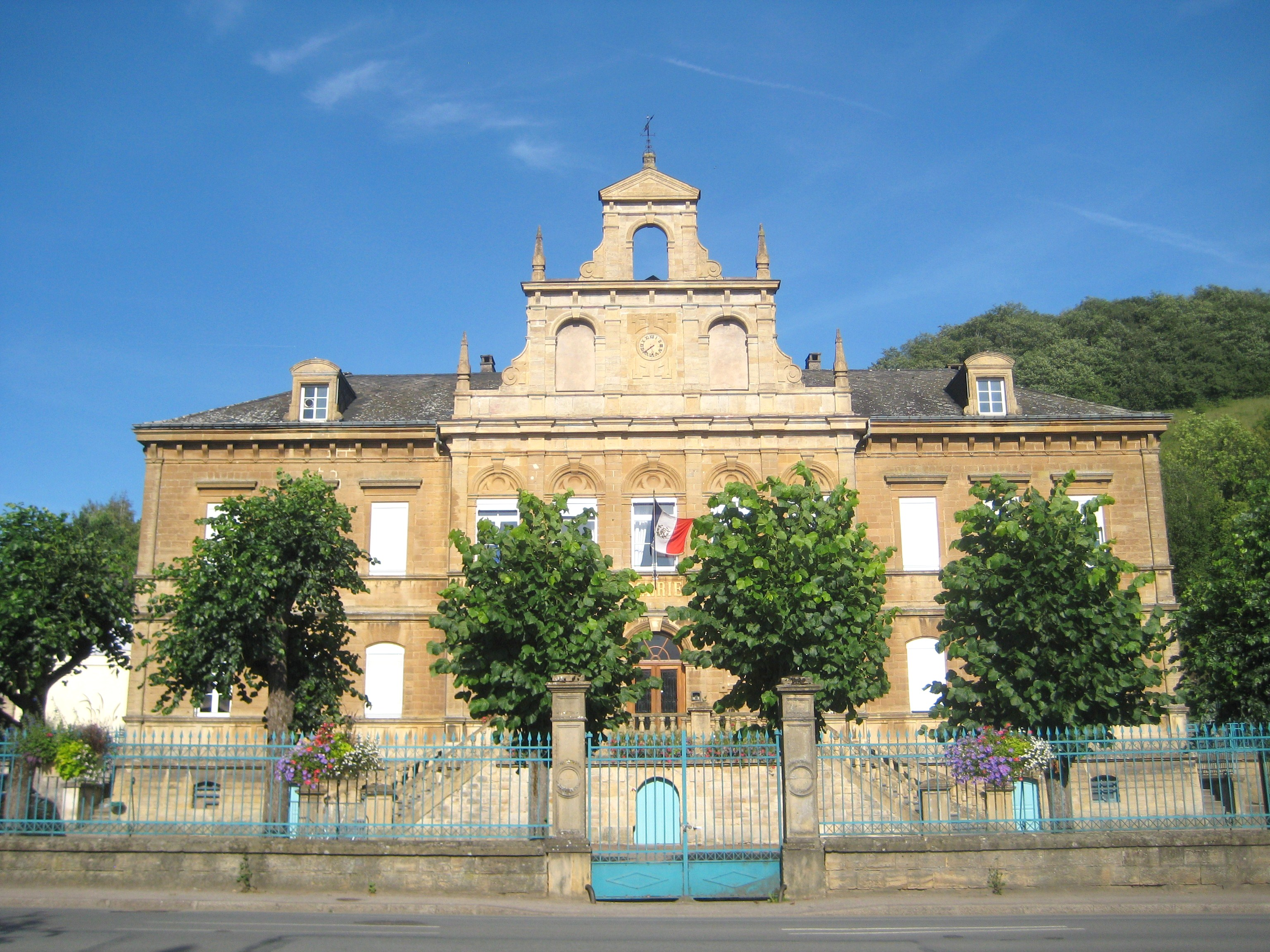
- The town hall in Fontoy

- Coat of arms
- Location of Fontoy
- Location within France Location within Grand Est
- Coordinates: 49°21′24″N 5°59′45″E
- Country: France
- Region: Grand Est
- Department: Moselle
- Arrondissement: Thionville
- Canton: Algrange
- Intercommunality: CA Portes de France-Thionville

Government
  - Mayor (2020–2026): Mathieu Weis
- Area^{1}: 16.88 km^{2} (6.52 sq mi)
- Elevation: 270 m (890 ft)
- Highest elevation: 387 m (1,270 ft)
- Lowest elevation: 205 m (673 ft)
- Population (2023): 3,184
  - Density: 188.6/km^{2} (488.5/sq mi)
- Time zone: UTC+01:00 (CET)
  - Summer (DST): UTC+02:00 (CEST)
- INSEE/Postal code: 57226 /57650
- ^{1} French Land Register data, which excludes lakes, ponds, glaciers > 1 km^{2} (0.386 sq mi or 247 acres) and river estuaries.

Fontoy (French pronunciation: [fɔ̃twa]; German: Fentsch; Lorraine Franconian: Fensch) is a commune in the Moselle department in Grand Est in north-eastern France.

It contains the source of the Fensch river.

== Population ==
Historical population
Year	Pop.	±% p.a.
1968	3,718	—
1975	3,614	−0.40%
1982	3,619	+0.02%
1990	3,256	−1.31%
1999	3,149	−0.37%
2007	3,069	−0.32%
2012	3,035	−0.22%
2017	3,036	+0.01%
2023	3,184	+0.80%
Source: INSEE

== See also ==
- Communes of the Moselle department
