= Knutange =

- Commune
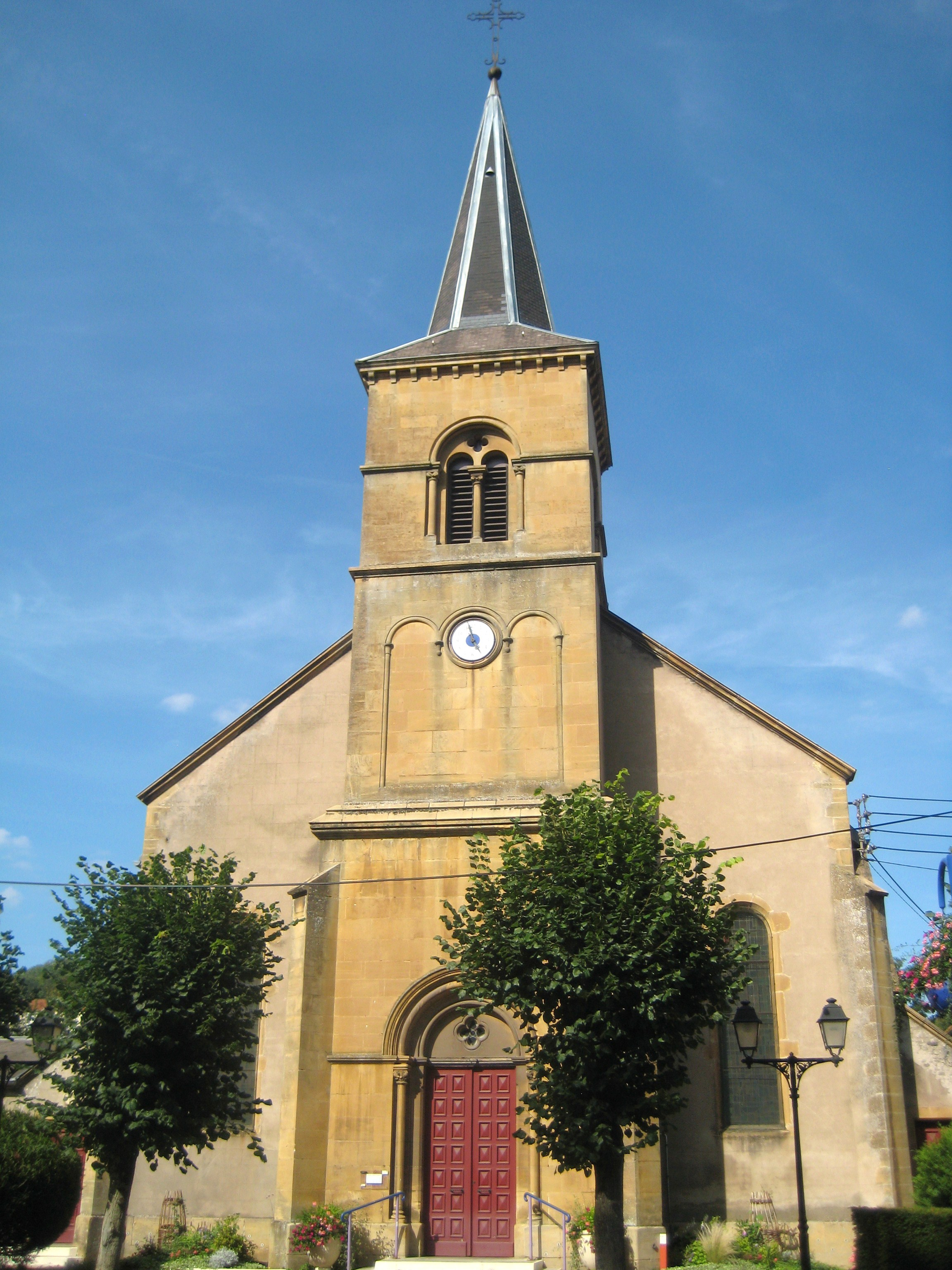
- The church in Knutange

- Coat of arms
- Location of Knutange
- Location within France Location within Grand Est
- Coordinates: 49°20′21″N 6°02′28″E
- Country: France
- Region: Grand Est
- Department: Moselle
- Arrondissement: Thionville
- Canton: Algrange
- Intercommunality: CA du Val de Fensch

Government
  - Mayor (2020–2026): Fabrice Cerbai
- Area^{1}: 2.43 km^{2} (0.94 sq mi)
- Elevation: 200 m (660 ft)
- Highest elevation: 366 m (1,201 ft)
- Lowest elevation: 196 m (643 ft)
- Population (2023): 3,199
  - Density: 1,320/km^{2} (3,410/sq mi)
- Time zone: UTC+01:00 (CET)
  - Summer (DST): UTC+02:00 (CEST)
- INSEE/Postal code: 57368 /57240
- ^{1} French Land Register data, which excludes lakes, ponds, glaciers > 1 km^{2} (0.386 sq mi or 247 acres) and river estuaries.

Knutange (French pronunciation: [knytɑ̃ʒ]; Lorraine Franconian: Knéiténgen/Knéiténg; German: Kneuttingen) is a commune in the Moselle department in Grand Est in north-eastern France.

== Population ==
Historical population
Year	Pop.	±% p.a.
1968	4,433	—
1975	4,104	−1.10%
1982	3,649	−1.66%
1990	3,772	+0.42%
1999	3,632	−0.42%
2007	3,437	−0.69%
2012	3,239	−1.18%
2017	3,203	−0.22%
2023	3,199	−0.02%
Source: INSEE

== See also ==
- Communes of the Moselle department
