= Tressange =

- Commune
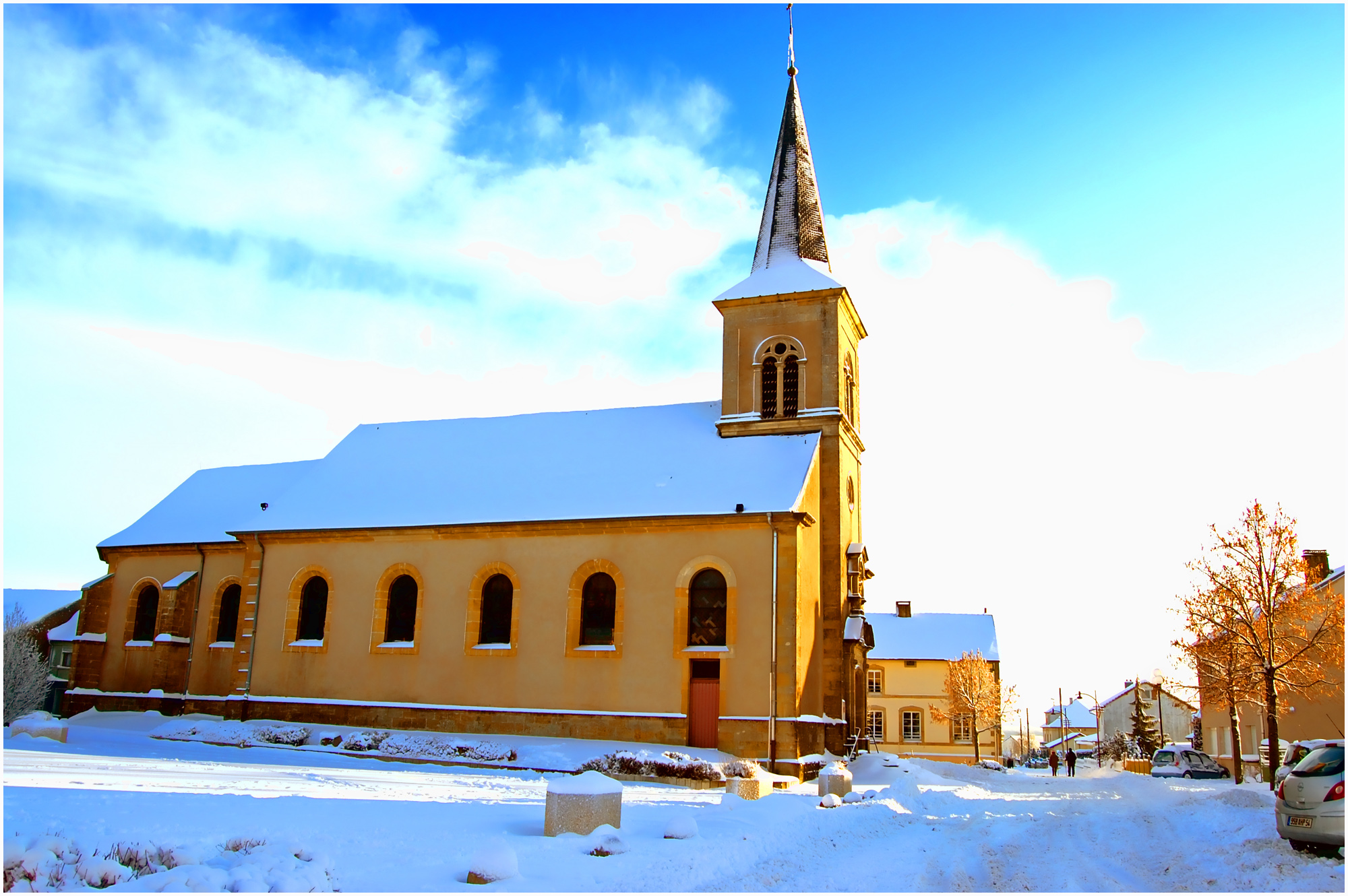
- The church in Tressange

- Coat of arms
- Location of Tressange
- Location within France Location within Grand Est
- Coordinates: 49°24′13″N 5°58′56″E
- Country: France
- Region: Grand Est
- Department: Moselle
- Arrondissement: Thionville
- Canton: Algrange
- Intercommunality: CA Portes de France-Thionville

Government
  - Mayor (2020–2026): Denis Schitz
- Area^{1}: 9.36 km^{2} (3.61 sq mi)
- Elevation: 346 m (1,135 ft)
- Highest elevation: 392 m (1,286 ft)
- Lowest elevation: 316 m (1,037 ft)
- Population (2023): 2,470
  - Density: 264/km^{2} (683/sq mi)
- Time zone: UTC+01:00 (CET)
  - Summer (DST): UTC+02:00 (CEST)
- INSEE/Postal code: 57678 /57710
- ^{1} French Land Register data, which excludes lakes, ponds, glaciers > 1 km^{2} (0.386 sq mi or 247 acres) and river estuaries.

Tressange (French pronunciation: [tʁɛsɑ̃ʒ]; German: Tressingen; Lorraine Franconian Träisséng/Dreschéng) is a commune in the Moselle department in Grand Est in north-eastern France. It is 7 km from the border to Luxembourg.

== Population ==
Historical population
Year	Pop.	±% p.a.
1968	1,937	—
1975	1,713	−1.74%
1982	1,927	+1.70%
1990	2,012	+0.54%
1999	1,986	−0.14%
2007	1,955	−0.20%
2012	1,983	+0.28%
2017	2,132	+1.46%
2023	2,470	+2.48%
Source: INSEE

== Geography ==
Tressange is located 10 km northwest of Thionville and 6 km south of the Luxembourg border. The commune lies at elevations ranging from 316 to 392 metres above sea level, with an average elevation of 346 metres. It covers an area of 9.36 km² and includes the hamlets of Bure and Ludelange.

== See also ==
- Communes of the Moselle department
