= Florange =

- Commune
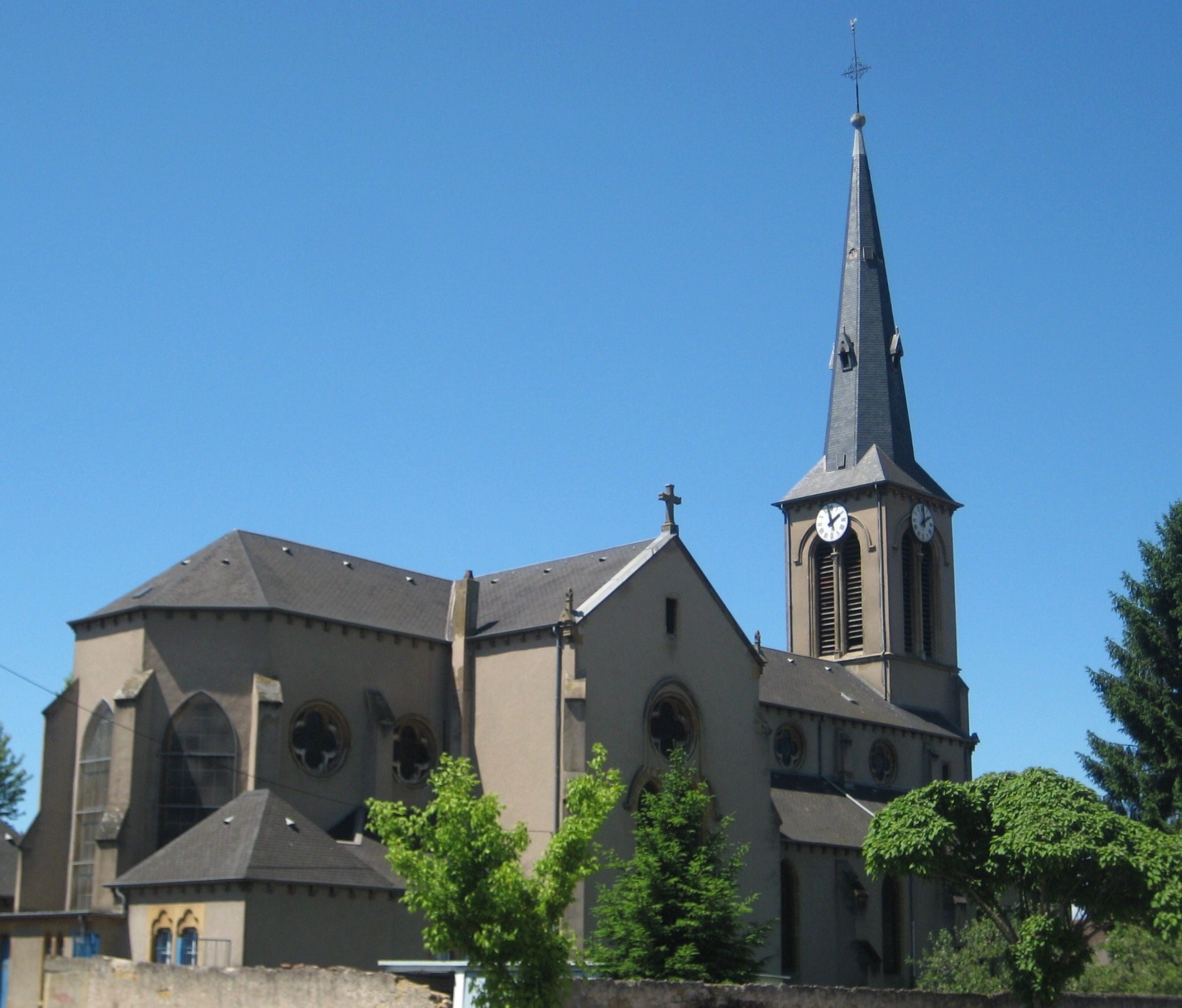
- St. Agatha's Church

- Coat of arms
- Location of Florange
- Location within France Location within Grand Est
- Coordinates: 49°19′20″N 6°07′09″E
- Country: France
- Region: Grand Est
- Department: Moselle
- Arrondissement: Thionville
- Canton: Fameck
- Intercommunality: CA du Val de Fensch

Government
  - Mayor (2020–2026): Rémy Dick
- Area^{1}: 13.18 km^{2} (5.09 sq mi)
- Elevation: 170 m (560 ft)
- Highest elevation: 232 m (761 ft)
- Lowest elevation: 153 m (502 ft)
- Population (2023): 12,035
  - Density: 913.1/km^{2} (2,365/sq mi)
- Demonym: Florangeois(es)
- Time zone: UTC+01:00 (CET)
  - Summer (DST): UTC+02:00 (CEST)
- INSEE/Postal code: 57221 /57190
- Website: ville-florange.fr
- ^{1} French Land Register data, which excludes lakes, ponds, glaciers > 1 km^{2} (0.386 sq mi or 247 acres) and river estuaries.

Florange (French pronunciation: [flɔʁɑ̃ʒ]; Lorraine Franconian: Fléischengen/Fléschéngen; German: Flörchingen) is a commune in the Moselle department in Grand Est in north-eastern France.

== History ==
Between 1870 and 1918, the German state occupied Florange, which was then known as Flörchingen. The blacksmith's art and then steelmaking have been a constant in the city ever since the De Wendel family installed itself and Jean-Martin Wendel (1665-1737), who founded the industrial fortune of the family.

French president François Hollande and his associate Arnaud Montebourg in 2012 threatened to nationalize the steelmaking plant of ArcelorMittal, but backed down when they industrialists offered to revisit their plans to lay off more than 600 workers at two blast furnaces there and agreed to invest €180 million over five years in steel finishing.

== Economy ==
Florange is the site of one of ArcelorMittal's steelmaking plants, and in September 2021 the company announced the investment of 89 million euros for a new galvanized steel production line. For a time in 2012, Florange was the supplier for PSA Peugeot Citroen's Sochaux and Mulhouse vehicle assembly plants and all of the supply for the German assembly plants of Mercedes-Benz, Volkswagen, BMW and Opel. Reportedly Mercedes has an entire production line of galvanized steel devoted to its exclusive use.

Safran has a nacelle fabrication shop.

== Geography ==
=== Climate ===
Climate in area is mild with few extremes of temperature and ample precipitation in all months. The Köppen Climate Classification subtype for this climate is "Cfb" (Marine West Coast Climate).

Climate data for Florange, France
Month	Jan	Feb	Mar	Apr	May	Jun	Jul	Aug	Sep	Oct	Nov	Dec	Year
Mean daily maximum °C (°F)	4 (39)	6 (42)	11 (52)	15 (59)	19 (66)	22 (71)	24 (75)	23 (73)	20 (68)	14 (58)	8 (47)	5 (41)	14 (58)
Mean daily minimum °C (°F)	−3 (27)	−2 (28)	1 (33)	3 (37)	7 (44)	10 (50)	12 (53)	11 (52)	9 (49)	5 (41)	2 (35)	0 (32)	4 (40)
Average precipitation mm (inches)	58 (2.3)	56 (2.2)	43 (1.7)	48 (1.9)	74 (2.9)	74 (2.9)	64 (2.5)	94 (3.7)	81 (3.2)	56 (2.2)	64 (2.5)	76 (3)	790 (31)
Source: Weatherbase

== Population ==
Historical population
Year	Pop.	±% p.a.
1968	12,543	—
1975	12,446	−0.11%
1982	11,766	−0.80%
1990	11,304	−0.50%
1999	10,778	−0.53%
2007	11,039	+0.30%
2012	11,516	+0.85%
2017	11,951	+0.74%
2023	12,035	+0.12%
Source: INSEE

== See also ==
- Communes of the Moselle department
