= Arrondissement of Thionville-Est =

Coordinates: 49.35°N 6.15°E

Thionville-Est
- Former arrondissement
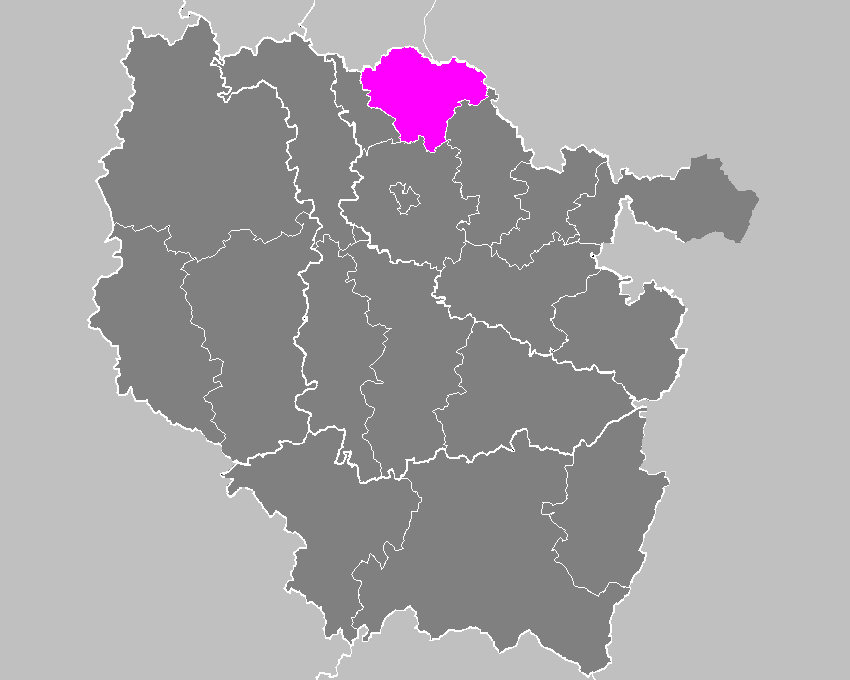
- Location within the former region Lorraine
- Country: France
- Region: Grand Est
- Department: Moselle
- No. of communes: {{{nbcomm}}}
- Disbanded: 2015
- Area: 686 km^{2} (265 sq mi)
- Population (2012): 79,847
  - Density: 116/km^{2} (301/sq mi)

The arrondissement of Thionville-Est is a former arrondissement of France in the Moselle department in the Lorraine region. In 2015 it was merged into the new arrondissement of Thionville. It had 75 communes, and its population was 79,847 (2012).

== Composition ==
The communes of the arrondissement of Thionville-Est, and their INSEE codes, were:

1. Aboncourt (57001)	2. Apach (57026)	3. Basse-Ham (57287)	4. Basse-Rentgen (57574)
5. Berg-sur-Moselle (57062)	6. Bertrange (57067)	7. Bettelainville (57072)	8. Beyren-lès-Sierck (57076)
9. Bousse (57102)	10. Boust (57104)	11. Breistroff-la-Grande (57109)	12. Buding (57117)
13. Budling (57118)	14. Cattenom (57124)	15. Contz-les-Bains (57152)	16. Distroff (57179)
17. Elzange (57191)	18. Entrange (57194)	19. Escherange (57199)	20. Fixem (57214)
21. Flastroff (57215)	22. Gavisse (57245)	23. Grindorff-Bizing (57259)	24. Guénange (57269)
25. Hagen (57282)	26. Halstroff (57286)	27. Haute-Kontz (57371)	28. Hettange-Grande (57323)
29. Hombourg-Budange (57331)	30. Hunting (57341)	31. Illange (57343)	32. Inglange (57345)
33. Kanfen (57356)	34. Kemplich (57359)	35. Kerling-lès-Sierck (57361)	36. Kirsch-lès-Sierck (57364)
37. Kirschnaumen (57365)	38. Klang (57367)	39. Kœnigsmacker (57370)	40. Kuntzig (57372)
41. Kédange-sur-Canner (57358)	42. Laumesfeld (57387)	43. Launstroff (57388)	44. Luttange (57426)
45. Malling (57437)	46. Manderen (57439)	47. Manom (57441)	48. Merschweiller (57459)
49. Metzeresche (57464)	50. Metzervisse (57465)	51. Mondorff (57475)	52. Monneren (57476)
53. Montenach (57479)	54. Oudrenne (57531)	55. Puttelange-lès-Thionville (57557)	56. Rettel (57576)
57. Ritzing (57585)	58. Rodemack (57588)	59. Roussy-le-Village (57600)	60. Rurange-lès-Thionville (57602)
61. Rustroff (57604)	62. Rémeling (57569)	63. Sierck-les-Bains (57650)	64. Stuckange (57767)
65. Terville (57666)	66. Thionville (57672)	67. Valmestroff (57689)	68. Veckring (57704)
69. Volmerange-les-Mines (57731)	70. Volstroff (57733)	71. Waldweistroff (57739)	72. Waldwisse (57740)
73. Yutz (57757)	74. Zoufftgen (57764)	75. Évrange (57203)	

== History ==
The arrondissement of Thionville-Est was created in 1919. It was disbanded in 2015. As a result of the reorganisation of the cantons of France which came into effect in 2015, the borders of the cantons are no longer related to the borders of the arrondissements. The cantons of the arrondissement of Thionville-Est were, as of January 2015:

1. Cattenom
2. Metzervisse
3. Sierck-les-Bains
4. Thionville-Est
5. Thionville-Ouest
6. Yutz
