= Arrondissement of Thionville =

Coordinates: 49.4°N 6.2°E

Thionville
- Arrondissement
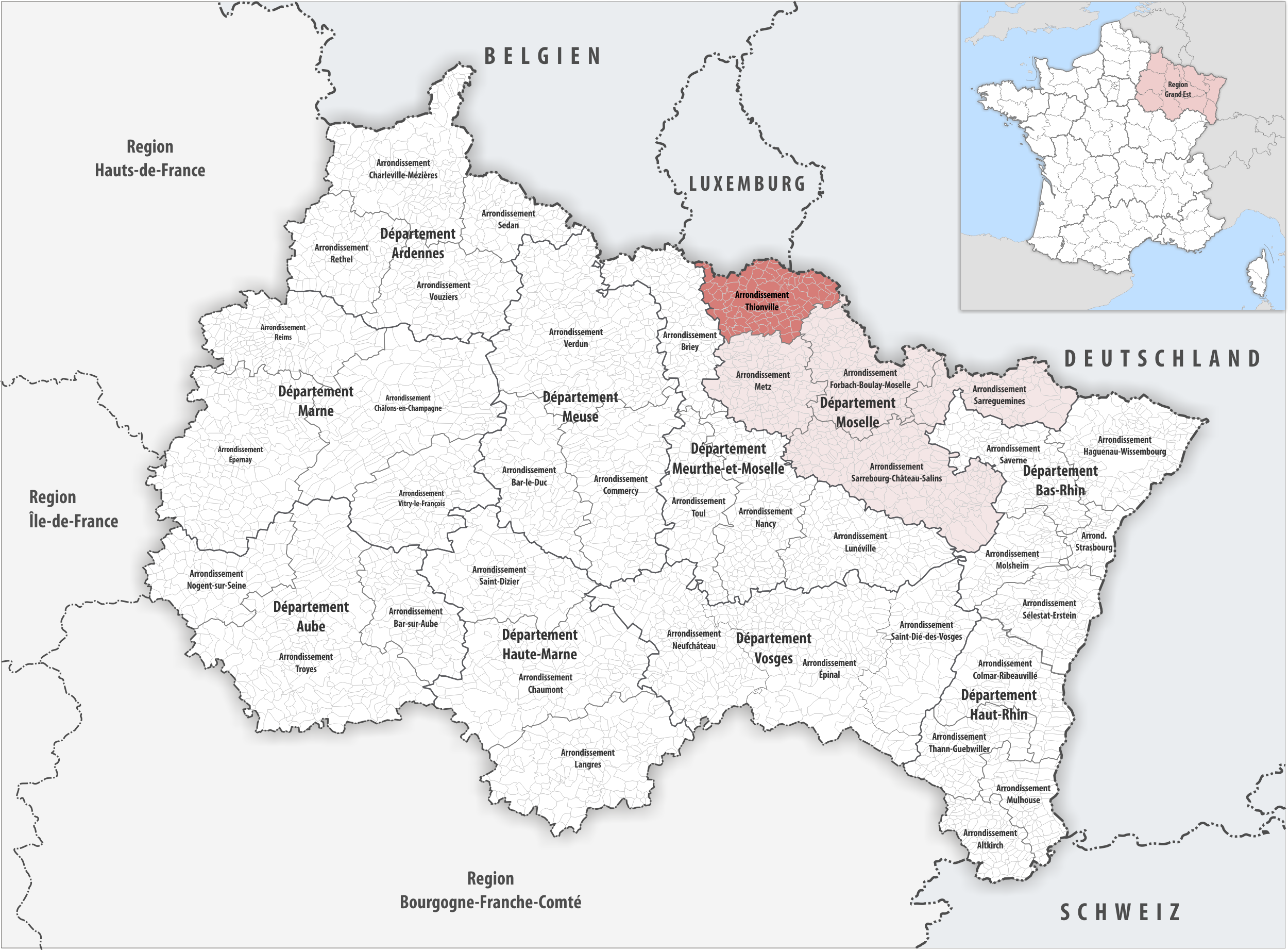
- Location within the region Grand Est
- Country: France
- Region: Grand Est
- Department: Moselle
- No. of communes: {{{nbcomm}}}
- Area: 941.5 km^{2} (363.5 sq mi)
- Population (2023): 275,474
  - Density: 292.6/km^{2} (757.8/sq mi)
- INSEE code: 577

The arrondissement of Thionville is an arrondissement of France in the Moselle department in the Grand Est region. It has 104 communes. Its population is 273,063 (2021), and its area is 941.5 km^{2} (363.5 sq mi).

== Composition ==
The communes of the arrondissement of Thionville are:

1. Aboncourt
2. Algrange
3. Angevillers
4. Apach
5. Audun-le-Tiche
6. Aumetz
7. Basse-Ham
8. Basse-Rentgen
9. Berg-sur-Moselle
10. Bertrange
11. Bettelainville
12. Beyren-lès-Sierck
13. Boulange
14. Bousse
15. Boust
16. Breistroff-la-Grande
17. Buding
18. Budling
19. Cattenom
20. Clouange
21. Contz-les-Bains
22. Distroff
23. Elzange
24. Entrange
25. Escherange
26. Évrange
27. Fameck
28. Fixem
29. Flastroff
30. Florange
31. Fontoy
32. Gandrange
33. Gavisse
34. Grindorff-Bizing
35. Guénange
36. Hagen
37. Halstroff
38. Haute-Kontz
39. Havange
40. Hayange
41. Hettange-Grande
42. Hombourg-Budange
43. Hunting
44. Illange
45. Inglange
46. Kanfen
47. Kédange-sur-Canner
48. Kemplich
49. Kerling-lès-Sierck
50. Kirsch-lès-Sierck
51. Kirschnaumen
52. Klang
53. Knutange
54. Kœnigsmacker
55. Kuntzig
56. Laumesfeld
57. Launstroff
58. Lommerange
59. Luttange
60. Malling
61. Manderen-Ritzing
62. Manom
63. Merschweiller
64. Metzeresche
65. Metzervisse
66. Mondelange
67. Mondorff
68. Monneren
69. Montenach
70. Moyeuvre-Grande
71. Moyeuvre-Petite
72. Neufchef
73. Nilvange
74. Ottange
75. Oudrenne
76. Puttelange-lès-Thionville
77. Ranguevaux
78. Rédange
79. Rémeling
80. Rettel
81. Richemont
82. Rochonvillers
83. Rodemack
84. Rosselange
85. Roussy-le-Village
86. Rurange-lès-Thionville
87. Russange
88. Rustroff
89. Serémange-Erzange
90. Sierck-les-Bains
91. Stuckange
92. Terville
93. Thionville
94. Tressange
95. Yutz
96. Uckange
97. Valmestroff
98. Veckring
99. Vitry-sur-Orne
100. Volmerange-les-Mines
101. Volstroff
102. Waldweistroff
103. Waldwisse
104. Zoufftgen

== History ==
The arrondissement of Thionville was created in 1800 and disbanded in 1871 (ceded to Germany). The arrondissement of Thionville was restored in January 2015 by the merger of the former arrondissements of Thionville-Est and Thionville-Ouest.
