= Aboncourt, Moselle =

Aboncourt
- Commune
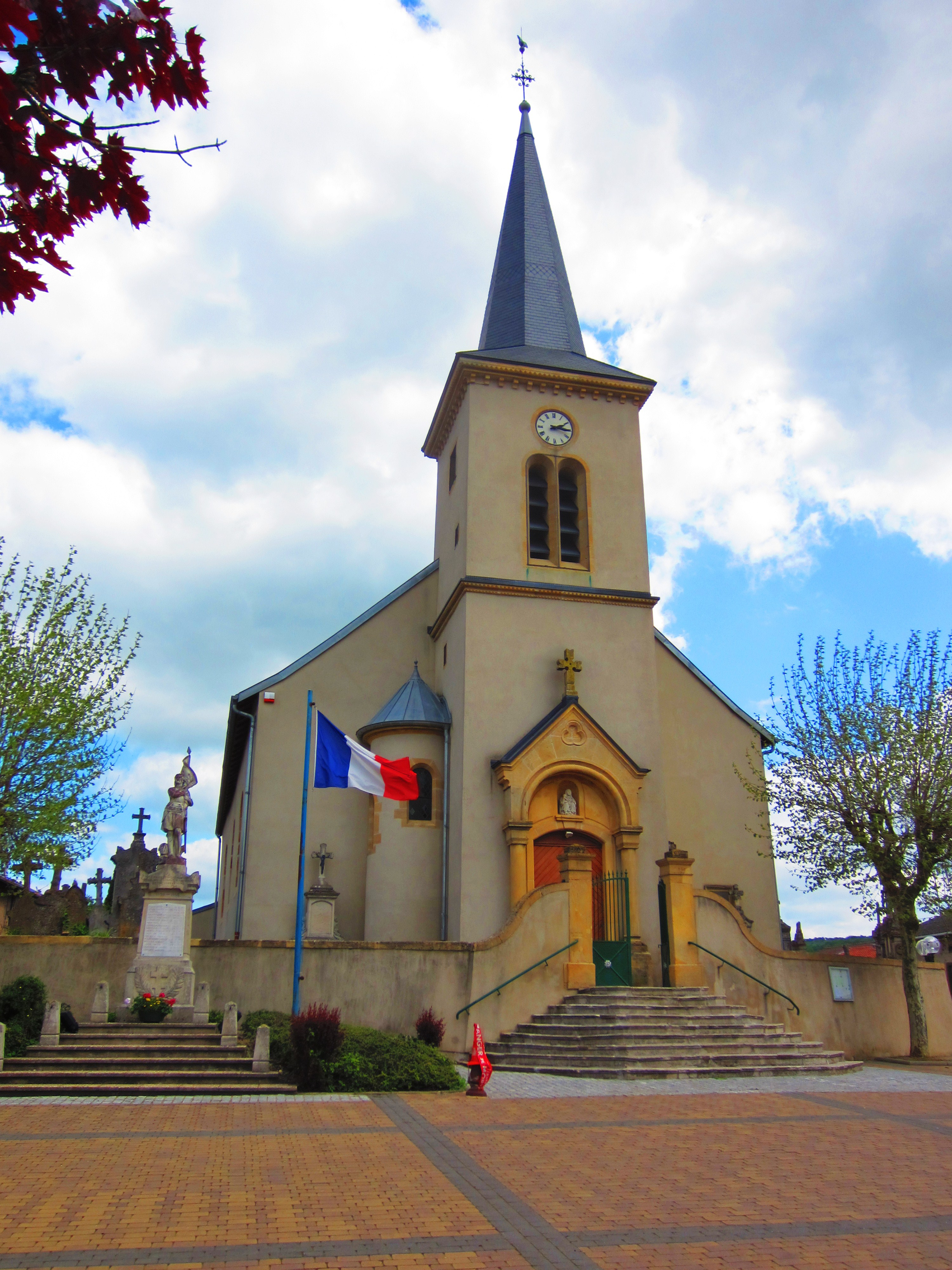
- The church in Aboncourt

- Coat of arms
- Location of Aboncourt
- Location within France Location within Grand Est
- Coordinates: 49°15′41″N 6°20′51″E
- Country: France
- Region: Grand Est
- Department: Moselle
- Arrondissement: Thionville
- Canton: Metzervisse
- Intercommunality: Arc Mosellan

Government
  - Mayor (2024–2026): Laurent Meresse
- Area^{1}: 5.9 km^{2} (2.3 sq mi)
- Elevation: 195 m (640 ft)
- Highest elevation: 315 m (1,033 ft)
- Lowest elevation: 192 m (630 ft)
- Population (2023): 320
  - Density: 54/km^{2} (140/sq mi)
- Demonym(s): Aboncourtois, Aboncourtoises
- Time zone: UTC+01:00 (CET)
  - Summer (DST): UTC+02:00 (CEST)
- INSEE/Postal code: 57001 /57920
- ^{1} French Land Register data, which excludes lakes, ponds, glaciers > 1 km^{2} (0.386 sq mi or 247 acres) and river estuaries.

Aboncourt (French pronunciation: [abɔ̃kuʁ]; German: Endorf) is a commune in the Moselle department in Grand Est in northeastern France.

== Population ==
Historical population

Year	Pop.	±% p.a.
1793	439	—
1821	420	−0.16%
1841	396	−0.29%
1871	318	−0.73%
1900	306	−0.13%
1926	317	+0.14%
1946	303	−0.23%
1962	327	+0.48%
1968	287	−2.15%

Year	Pop.	±% p.a.
1975	240	−2.52%
1982	338	+5.01%
1990	337	−0.04%
1999	346	+0.29%
2007	354	+0.29%
2012	382	+1.53%
2017	351	−1.68%
2023	320	−1.53%

Source: EHESS (1793-1999) and INSEE

== See also ==
- Communes of the Moselle department
