= Volstroff =

- Commune
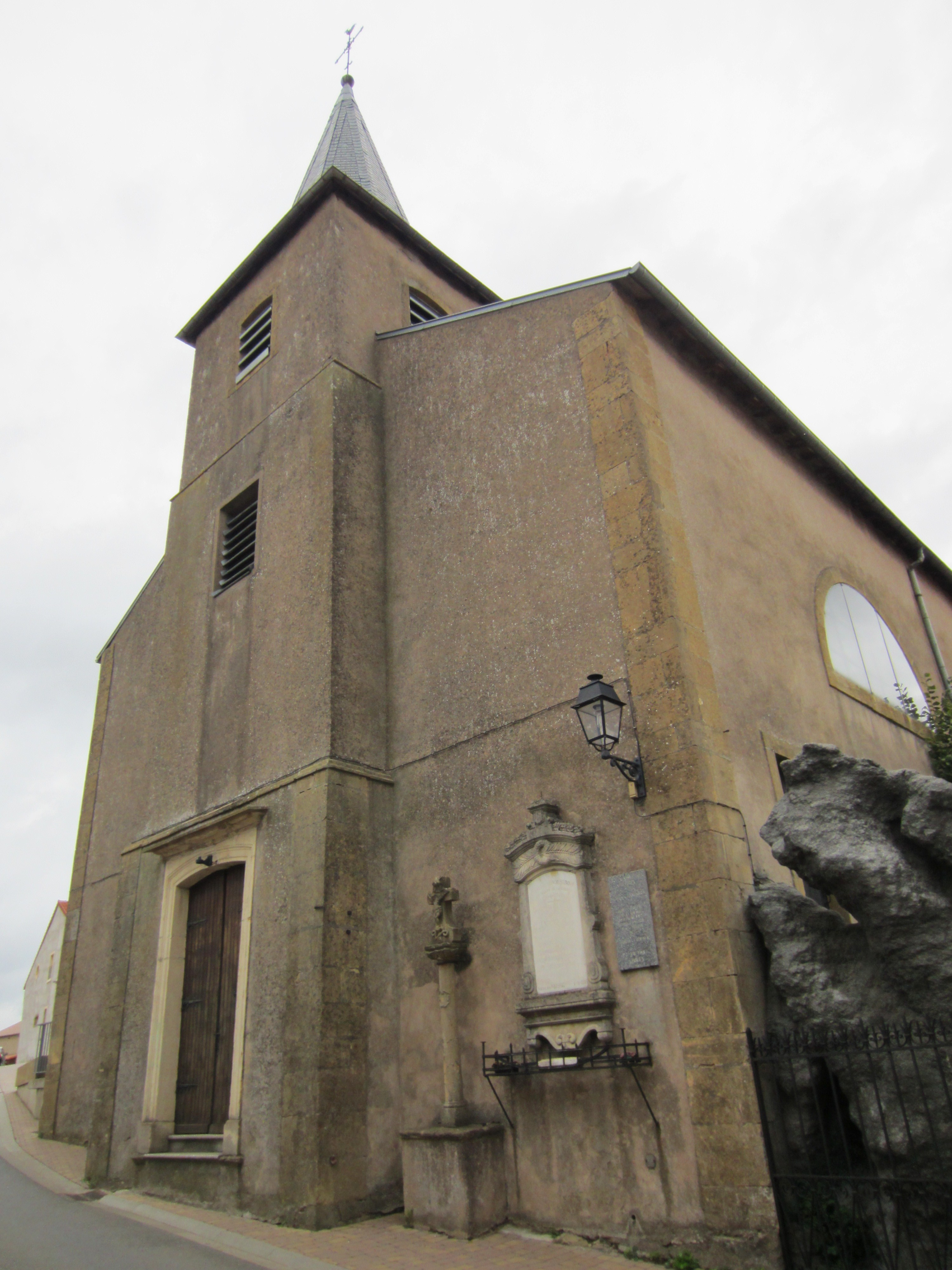
- Saint Michel church

- Coat of arms
- Location of Volstroff
- Location within France Location within Grand Est
- Coordinates: 49°18′43″N 6°15′36″E
- Country: France
- Region: Grand Est
- Department: Moselle
- Arrondissement: Thionville
- Canton: Metzervisse
- Intercommunality: Arc Mosellan

Government
  - Mayor (2020–2026): Jean-Michel Magard
- Area^{1}: 12.22 km^{2} (4.72 sq mi)
- Highest elevation: 238 m (781 ft)
- Lowest elevation: 165 m (541 ft)
- Population (2023): 2,044
  - Density: 167.3/km^{2} (433.2/sq mi)
- Time zone: UTC+01:00 (CET)
  - Summer (DST): UTC+02:00 (CEST)
- INSEE/Postal code: 57733 /57940
- ^{1} French Land Register data, which excludes lakes, ponds, glaciers > 1 km^{2} (0.386 sq mi or 247 acres) and river estuaries.

Volstroff (French pronunciation: [vɔlstʁɔf]; German: Wolsdorf; Lorraine Franconian Wolschdrëf/Wolschtrof) is a commune in the Moselle department in Grand Est in north-eastern France.

== Population ==
Historical population
Year	Pop.	±% p.a.
1968	291	—
1975	912	+17.73%
1982	1,066	+2.25%
1990	1,373	+3.21%
1999	1,366	−0.06%
2007	1,461	+0.84%
2012	1,593	+1.75%
2017	1,965	+4.29%
2023	2,044	+0.66%
Source: INSEE

== Etymology ==
The toponym Volstroff is of Germanic origin, deriving from the anthroponym Volo. The suffix -stroff derives from Germanic -dorf, denoting village (see *þurpą).

== See also ==
- Communes of the Moselle department
