= Kirschnaumen =

- Commune
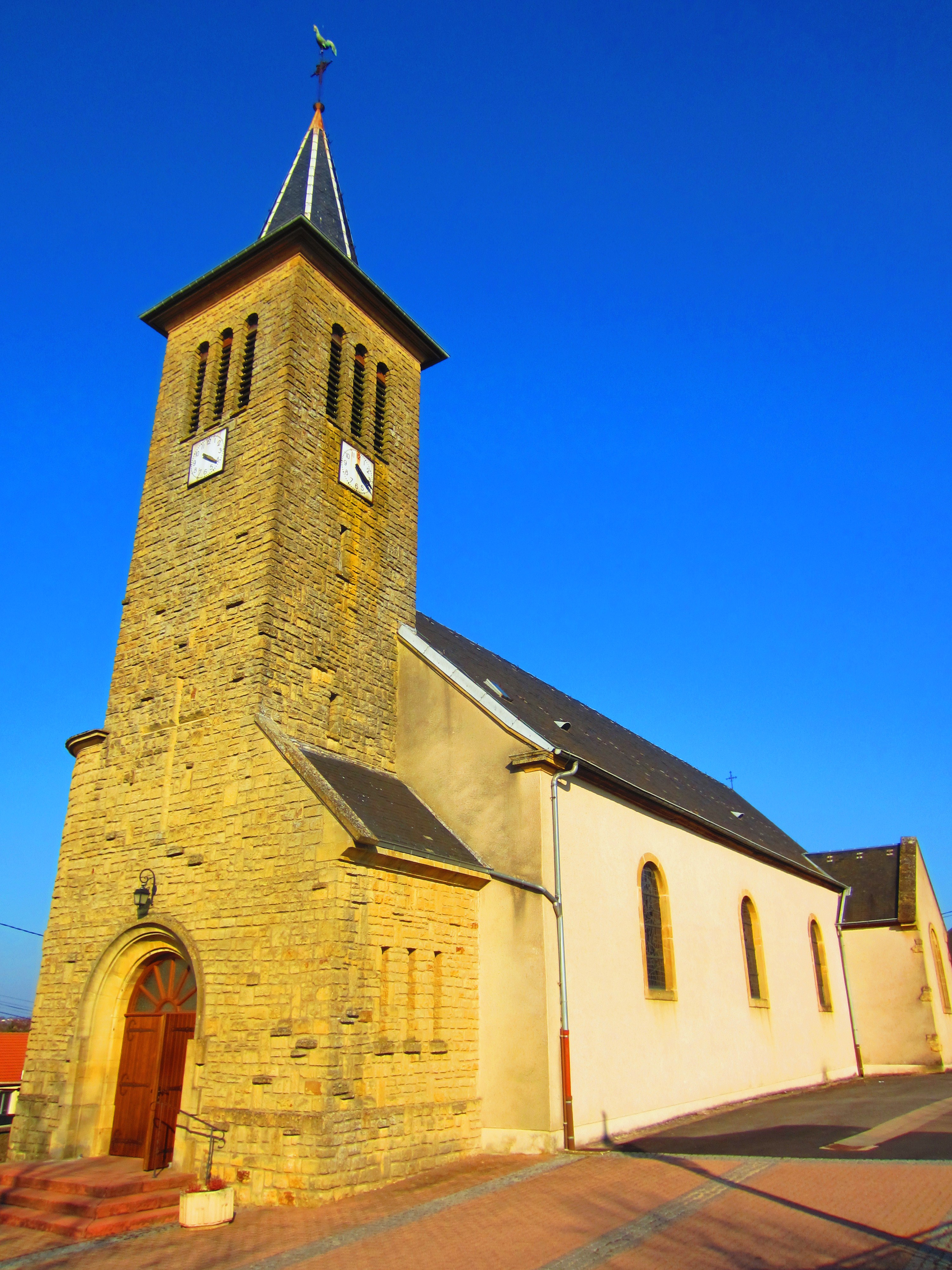
- The church in Kirschnaumen

- Coat of arms
- Location of Kirschnaumen
- Location within France Location within Grand Est
- Coordinates: 49°23′54″N 6°26′06″E
- Country: France
- Region: Grand Est
- Department: Moselle
- Arrondissement: Thionville
- Canton: Bouzonville
- Intercommunality: Bouzonvillois-Trois Frontières

Government
  - Mayor (2020–2026): Jean-Luc Niedercorn
- Area^{1}: 19.93 km^{2} (7.70 sq mi)
- Highest elevation: 351 m (1,152 ft)
- Lowest elevation: 255 m (837 ft)
- Population (2023): 481
  - Density: 24.1/km^{2} (62.5/sq mi)
- Time zone: UTC+01:00 (CET)
  - Summer (DST): UTC+02:00 (CEST)
- INSEE/Postal code: 57365 /57480
- ^{1} French Land Register data, which excludes lakes, ponds, glaciers > 1 km^{2} (0.386 sq mi or 247 acres) and river estuaries.

Kirschnaumen (German: Kirchnaumen) is a commune in the Moselle department in Grand Est in north-eastern France.

== See also ==
- Communes of the Moselle department
