= Waldweistroff =

- Commune
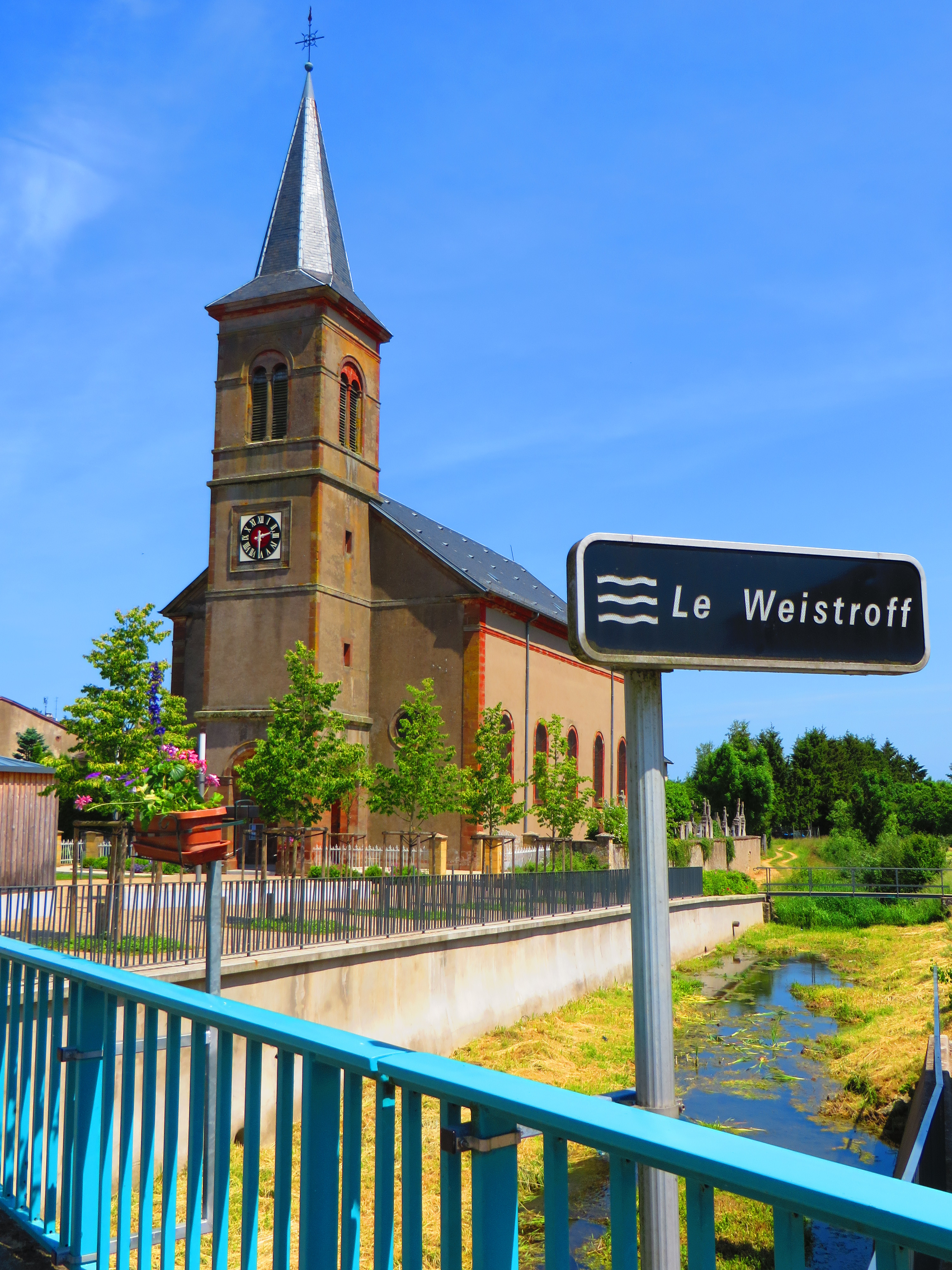
- The church in Waldweistroff

- Coat of arms
- Location of Waldweistroff
- Location within France Location within Grand Est
- Coordinates: 49°21′36″N 6°29′48″E
- Country: France
- Region: Grand Est
- Department: Moselle
- Arrondissement: Thionville
- Canton: Bouzonville
- Intercommunality: Bouzonvillois-Trois-Frontières

Government
  - Mayor (2020–2026): Jean-François Pirrone
- Area^{1}: 7.73 km^{2} (2.98 sq mi)
- Elevation: 240 m (790 ft)
- Highest elevation: 291 m (955 ft)
- Lowest elevation: 224 m (735 ft)
- Population (2023): 522
  - Density: 67.5/km^{2} (175/sq mi)
- Time zone: UTC+01:00 (CET)
  - Summer (DST): UTC+02:00 (CEST)
- INSEE/Postal code: 57739 /57320
- ^{1} French Land Register data, which excludes lakes, ponds, glaciers > 1 km^{2} (0.386 sq mi or 247 acres) and river estuaries.

Waldweistroff (French pronunciation: [valdvaistʁɔf]; German: Waldweisdorf) is a commune in the Moselle department in Grand Est in north-eastern France.

It is located on the German border.

== Population ==
Historical population
Year	Pop.	±% p.a.
1968	381	—
1975	402	+0.77%
1982	437	+1.20%
1990	405	−0.95%
1999	411	+0.16%
2007	406	−0.15%
2012	492	+3.92%
2017	494	+0.08%
2023	522	+0.92%
Source: INSEE

== See also ==
- Communes of the Moselle department
