= Grindorff-Bizing =

- Commune
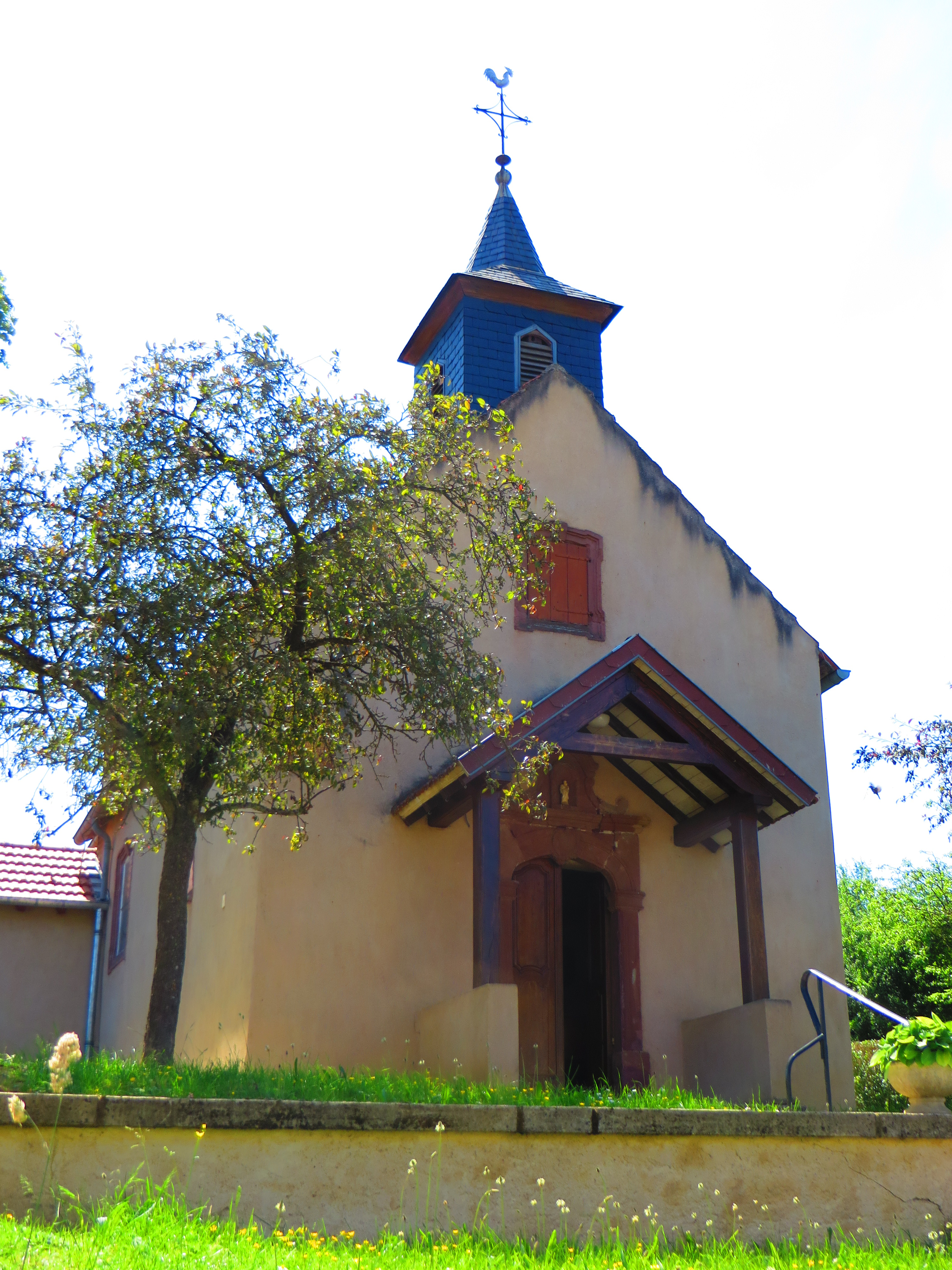
- The chapel in Grindorff

- Coat of arms
- Location of Grindorff-Bizing
- Location within France Location within Grand Est
- Coordinates: 49°23′N 6°31′E
- Country: France
- Region: Grand Est
- Department: Moselle
- Arrondissement: Thionville
- Canton: Bouzonville

Government
  - Mayor (2020–2026): Jean-Michel Schutz
- Area^{1}: 6.86 km^{2} (2.65 sq mi)
- Elevation: 300 m (980 ft)
- Highest elevation: 298 m (978 ft)
- Lowest elevation: 230 m (750 ft)
- Population (2023): 314
  - Density: 45.8/km^{2} (119/sq mi)
- Time zone: UTC+01:00 (CET)
  - Summer (DST): UTC+02:00 (CEST)
- INSEE/Postal code: 57259 /57480
- ^{1} French Land Register data, which excludes lakes, ponds, glaciers > 1 km^{2} (0.386 sq mi or 247 acres) and river estuaries.

Grindorff-Bizing (German: Grindorf-Bisingen, before 2002: Grindorff) is a commune in the Moselle department in Grand Est in north-eastern France.

== See also ==
- Communes of the Moselle department
