= Distroff =

- Commune
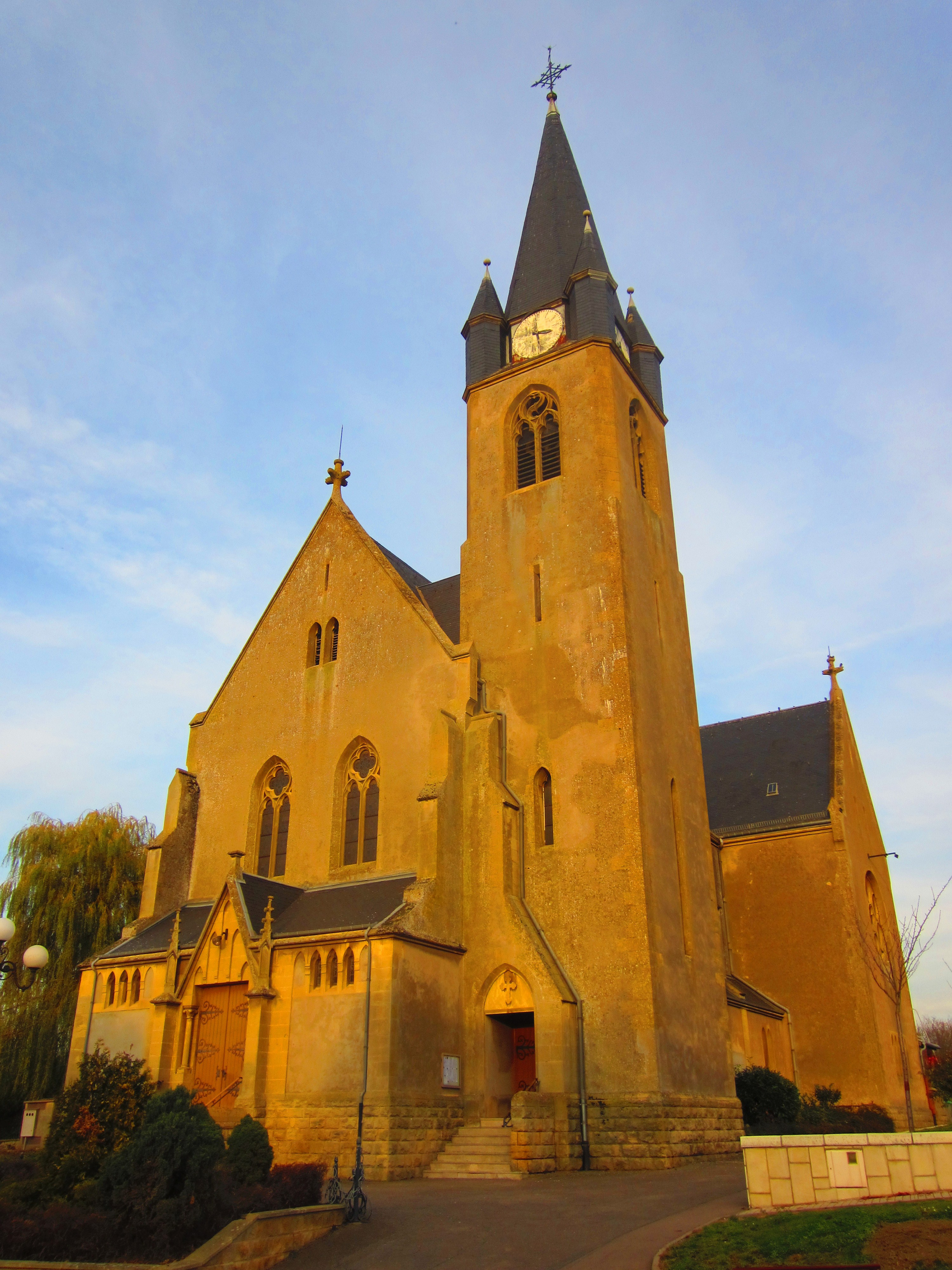
- The church in Distroff

- Coat of arms
- Location of Distroff
- Location within France Location within Grand Est
- Coordinates: 49°19′58″N 6°16′02″E
- Country: France
- Region: Grand Est
- Department: Moselle
- Arrondissement: Thionville
- Canton: Metzervisse
- Intercommunality: CC de l'Arc Mosellan

Government
  - Mayor (2020–2026): Manu Turquia
- Area^{1}: 7.93 km^{2} (3.06 sq mi)
- Elevation: 135 m (443 ft)
- Highest elevation: 257 m (843 ft)
- Lowest elevation: 163 m (535 ft)
- Population (2023): 1,828
  - Density: 231/km^{2} (597/sq mi)
- Time zone: UTC+01:00 (CET)
  - Summer (DST): UTC+02:00 (CEST)
- INSEE/Postal code: 57179 /57925
- ^{1} French Land Register data, which excludes lakes, ponds, glaciers > 1 km^{2} (0.386 sq mi or 247 acres) and river estuaries.

Distroff (French pronunciation: [distʁɔf]; German: Diesdorf) is a commune in the Moselle department in Grand Est in north-eastern France.

== See also ==
- Communes of the Moselle department
