= Kemplich =

- Commune
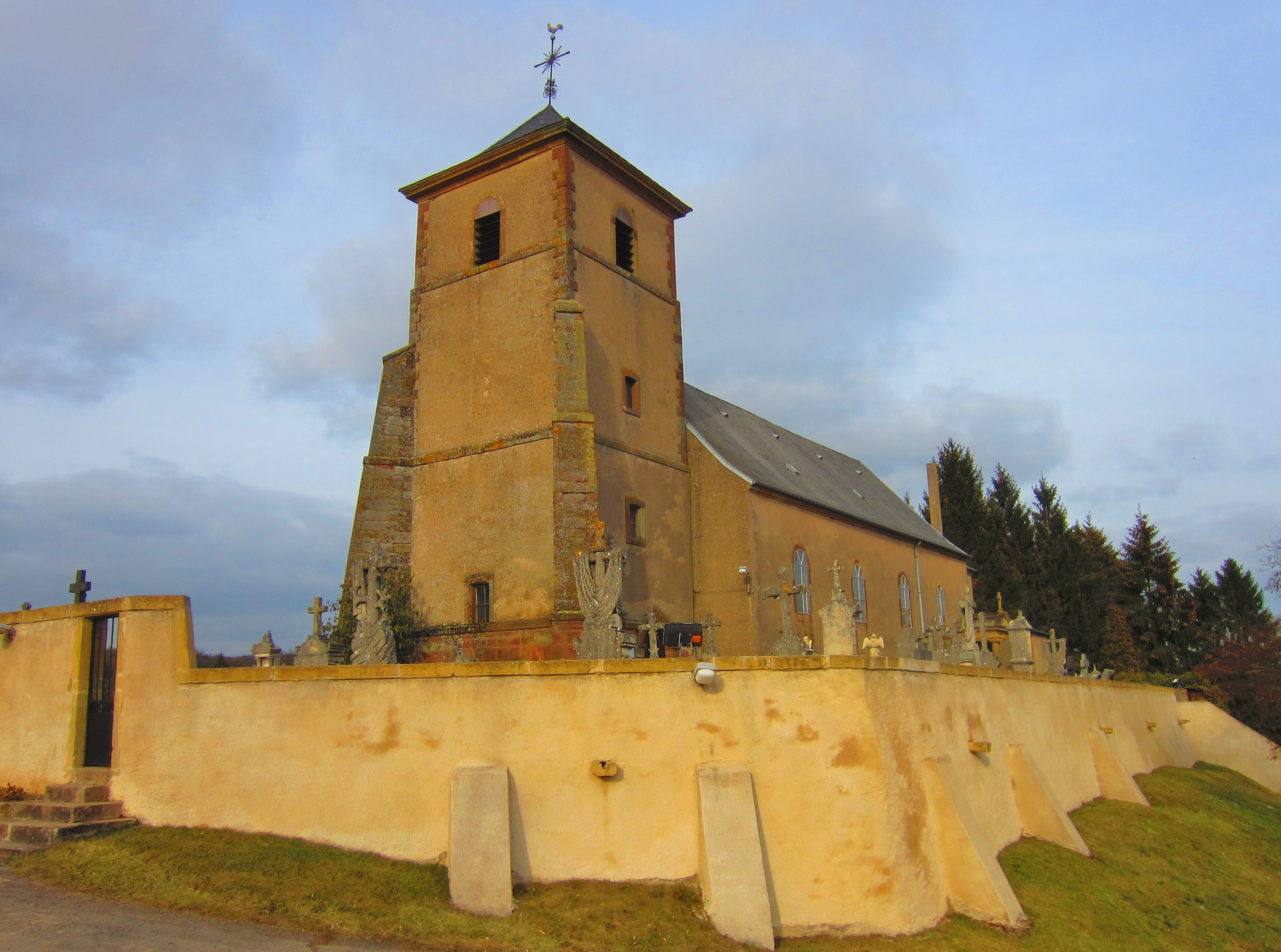
- The church in Kemplich

- Coat of arms
- Location of Kemplich
- Location within France Location within Grand Est
- Coordinates: 49°19′52″N 6°23′33″E
- Country: France
- Region: Grand Est
- Department: Moselle
- Arrondissement: Thionville
- Canton: Metzervisse
- Intercommunality: Arc Mosellan

Government
  - Mayor (2020–2026): Patrick Berveiller
- Area^{1}: 5.54 km^{2} (2.14 sq mi)
- Elevation: 270 m (890 ft)
- Highest elevation: 350 m (1,150 ft)
- Lowest elevation: 228 m (748 ft)
- Population (2023): 181
  - Density: 32.7/km^{2} (84.6/sq mi)
- Time zone: UTC+01:00 (CET)
  - Summer (DST): UTC+02:00 (CEST)
- INSEE/Postal code: 57359 /57920
- ^{1} French Land Register data, which excludes lakes, ponds, glaciers > 1 km^{2} (0.386 sq mi or 247 acres) and river estuaries.

Kemplich (French pronunciation: [kɛmpliʃ]) is a commune in the Moselle department in Grand Est in north-eastern France.

== Population ==
Historical population
Year	Pop.	±% p.a.
1968	185	—
1975	163	−1.79%
1982	159	−0.35%
1990	137	−1.84%
1999	120	−1.46%
2007	151	+2.91%
2012	161	+1.29%
2017	168	+0.85%
2023	181	+1.25%
Source: INSEE

== See also ==
- Communes of the Moselle department
