= Rémeling =

- Commune
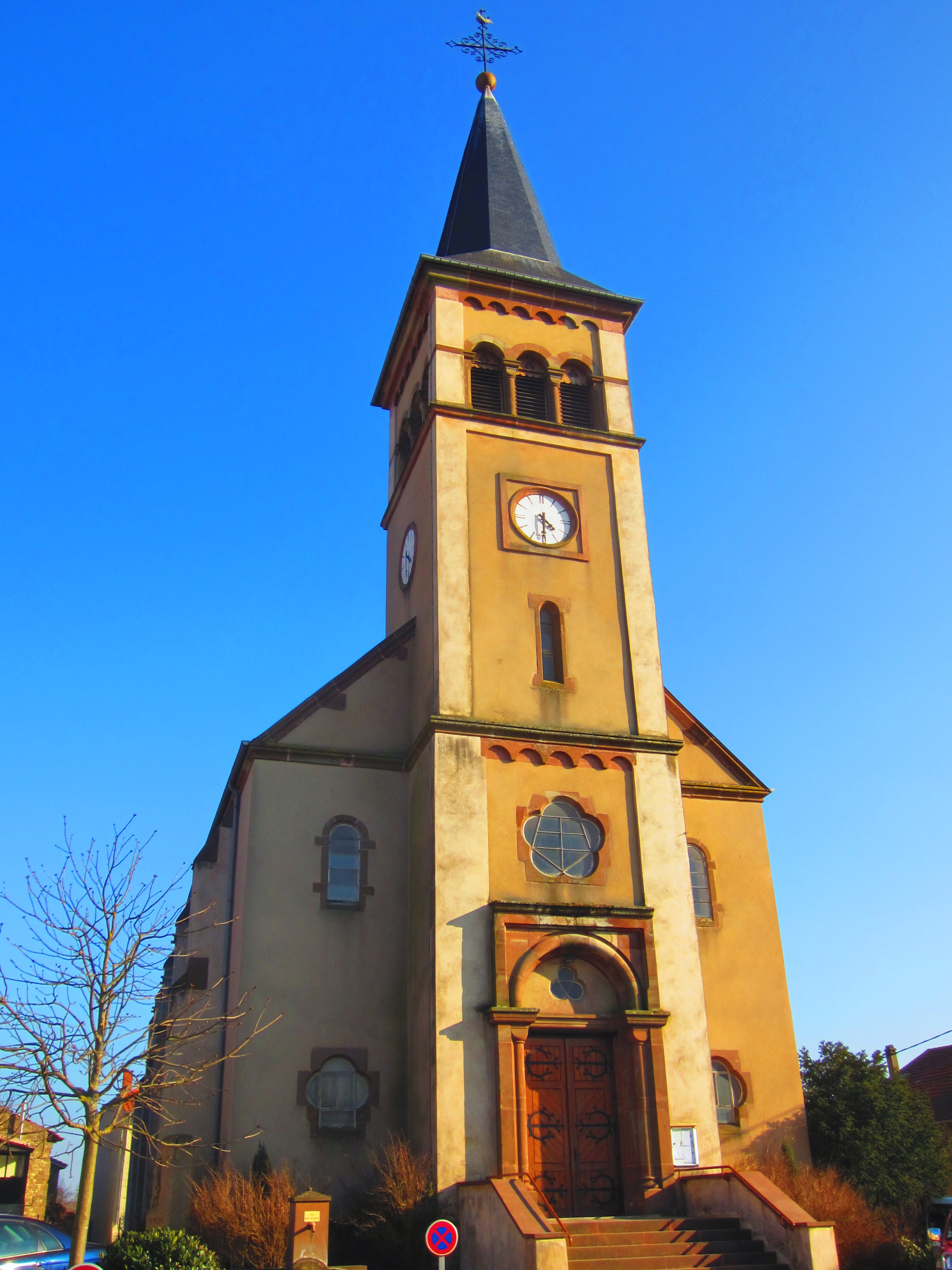
- The church in Rémeling

- Coat of arms
- Location of Rémeling
- Location within France Location within Grand Est
- Coordinates: 49°24′28″N 6°29′16″E
- Country: France
- Region: Grand Est
- Department: Moselle
- Arrondissement: Thionville
- Canton: Bouzonville
- Intercommunality: Bouzonvillois-Trois Frontières

Government
  - Mayor (2020–2026): Jean-Paul Tinnes
- Area^{1}: 6.47 km^{2} (2.50 sq mi)
- Elevation: 300 m (980 ft)
- Highest elevation: 349 m (1,145 ft)
- Lowest elevation: 253 m (830 ft)
- Population (2023): 329
  - Density: 50.9/km^{2} (132/sq mi)
- Time zone: UTC+01:00 (CET)
  - Summer (DST): UTC+02:00 (CEST)
- INSEE/Postal code: 57569 /57480
- ^{1} French Land Register data, which excludes lakes, ponds, glaciers > 1 km^{2} (0.386 sq mi or 247 acres) and river estuaries.

Rémeling (German: Reimelingen) is a commune in the Moselle department in Grand Est in north-eastern France.

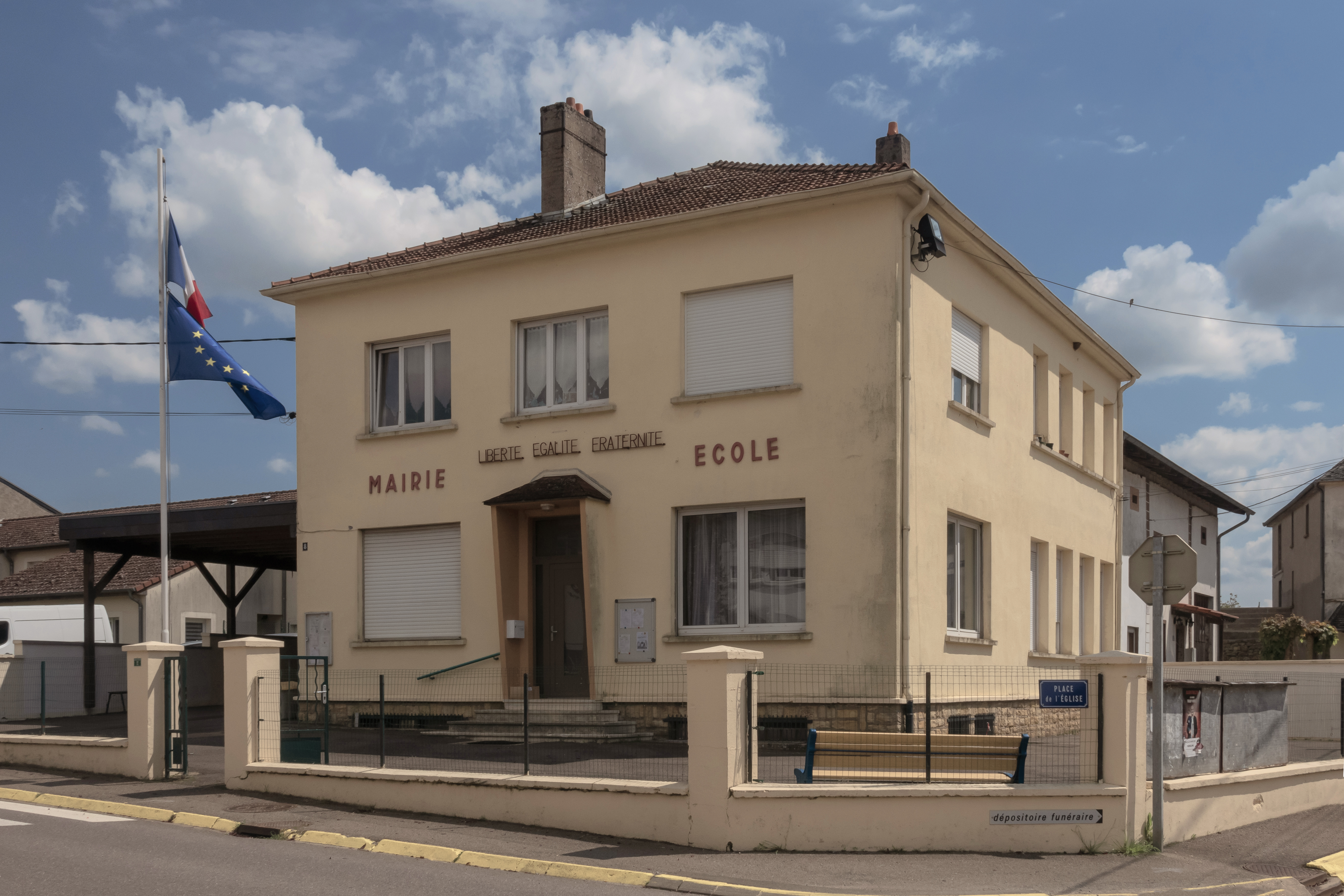
Remeling, townhall and school

== See also ==
- Communes of the Moselle department
