= Halstroff =

- Commune
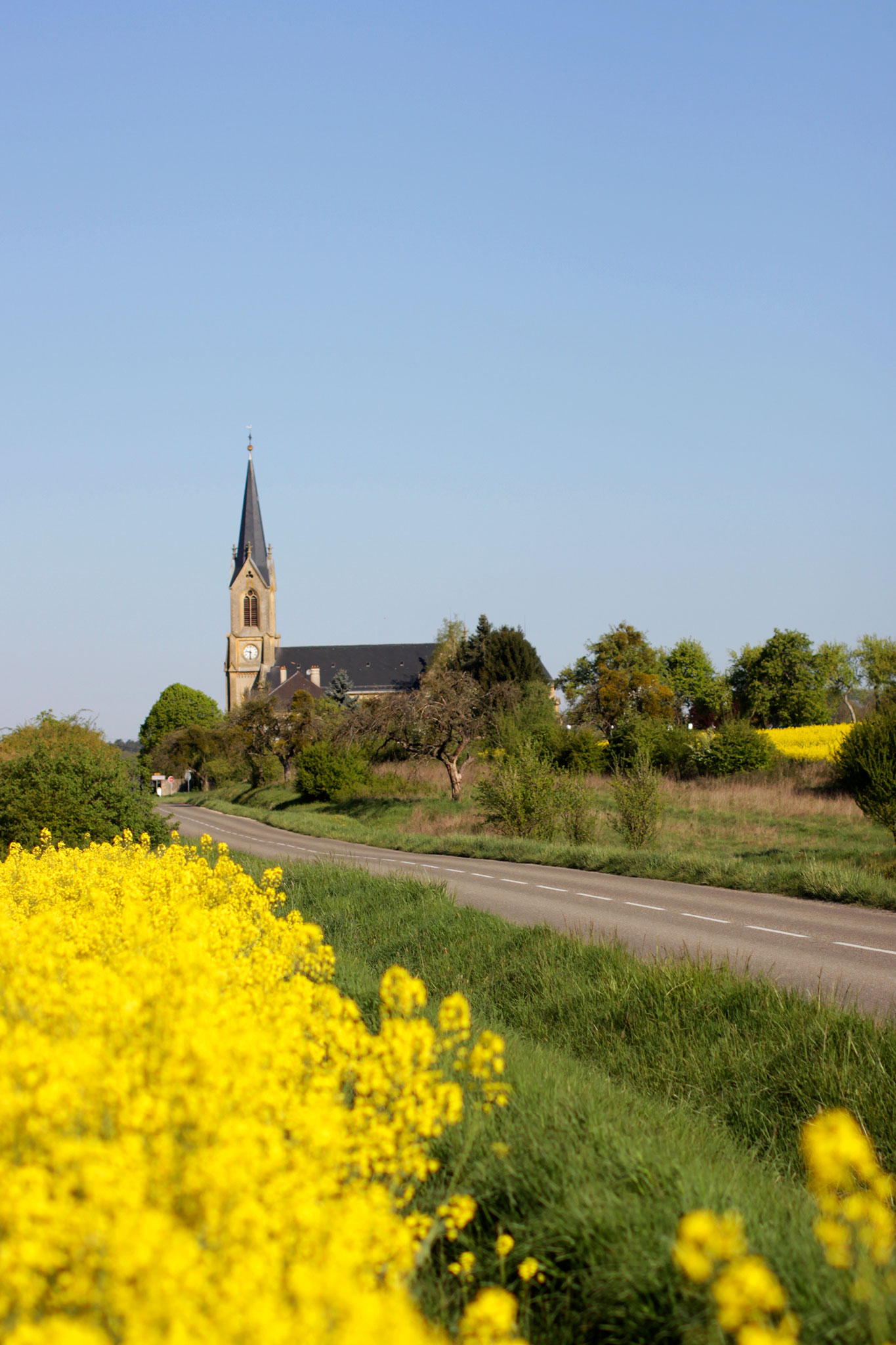
- The church and surroundings in Halstroff

- Coat of arms
- Location of Halstroff
- Location within France Location within Grand Est
- Coordinates: 49°23′14″N 6°29′18″E
- Country: France
- Region: Grand Est
- Department: Moselle
- Arrondissement: Thionville
- Canton: Bouzonville
- Intercommunality: Bouzonvillois-Trois Frontières

Government
  - Mayor (2020–2026): Christian Sommen
- Area^{1}: 10.78 km^{2} (4.16 sq mi)
- Elevation: 275 m (902 ft)
- Highest elevation: 313 m (1,027 ft)
- Lowest elevation: 248 m (814 ft)
- Population (2023): 288
  - Density: 26.7/km^{2} (69.2/sq mi)
- Time zone: UTC+01:00 (CET)
  - Summer (DST): UTC+02:00 (CEST)
- INSEE/Postal code: 57286 /57480
- ^{1} French Land Register data, which excludes lakes, ponds, glaciers > 1 km^{2} (0.386 sq mi or 247 acres) and river estuaries.

Halstroff (French pronunciation: [alstʁɔf]; German: Halsdorf) is a commune in the Moselle department in Grand Est in north-eastern France.

== See also ==
- Communes of the Moselle department
