= Bettelainville =

- Commune
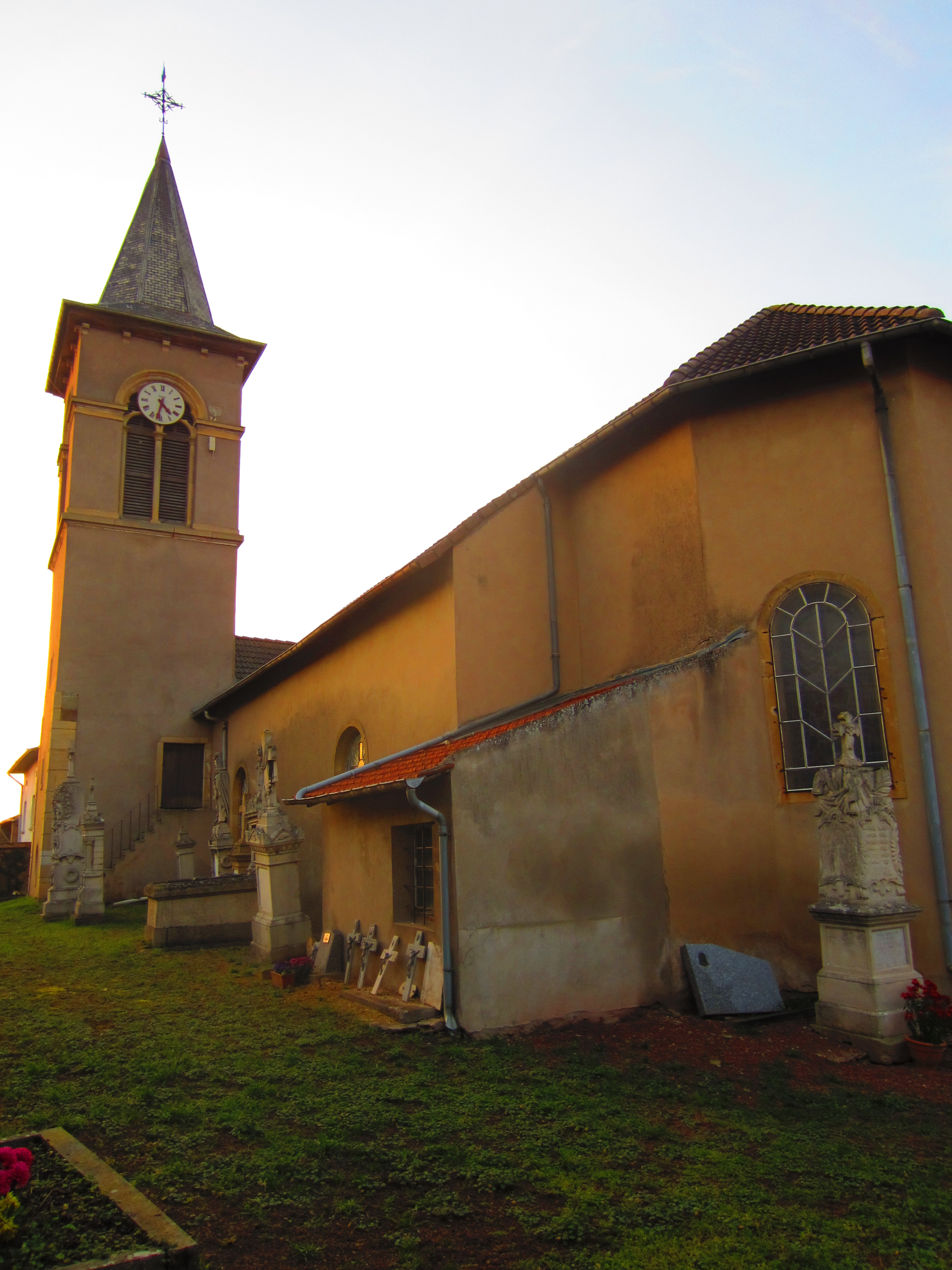
- The church in Bettelainville

- Coat of arms
- Location of Bettelainville
- Location within France Location within Grand Est
- Coordinates: 49°14′15″N 6°18′05″E
- Country: France
- Region: Grand Est
- Department: Moselle
- Arrondissement: Thionville
- Canton: Metzervisse
- Intercommunality: Arc mosellan

Government
  - Mayor (2020–2026): Bernard Diou
- Area^{1}: 13.71 km^{2} (5.29 sq mi)
- Elevation: 283 m (928 ft)
- Highest elevation: 301 m (988 ft)
- Lowest elevation: 198 m (650 ft)
- Population (2023): 626
  - Density: 45.7/km^{2} (118/sq mi)
- Time zone: UTC+01:00 (CET)
  - Summer (DST): UTC+02:00 (CEST)
- INSEE/Postal code: 57072 /57640
- ^{1} French Land Register data, which excludes lakes, ponds, glaciers > 1 km^{2} (0.386 sq mi or 247 acres) and river estuaries.

Bettelainville (French pronunciation: [bɛtlɛ̃vil]; German: Bettsdorf) is a commune in the Moselle department in Grand Est in northeastern France.
Altroff (German: Altdorf) and Mancy (German: Menchen) are incorporated in the commune since 1811.

== Population ==
Historical population
Year	Pop.	±% p.a.
1968	348	—
1975	393	+1.75%
1982	511	+3.82%
1990	513	+0.05%
1999	598	+1.72%
2007	608	+0.21%
2012	631	+0.75%
2017	625	−0.19%
2023	626	+0.03%
Source: INSEE

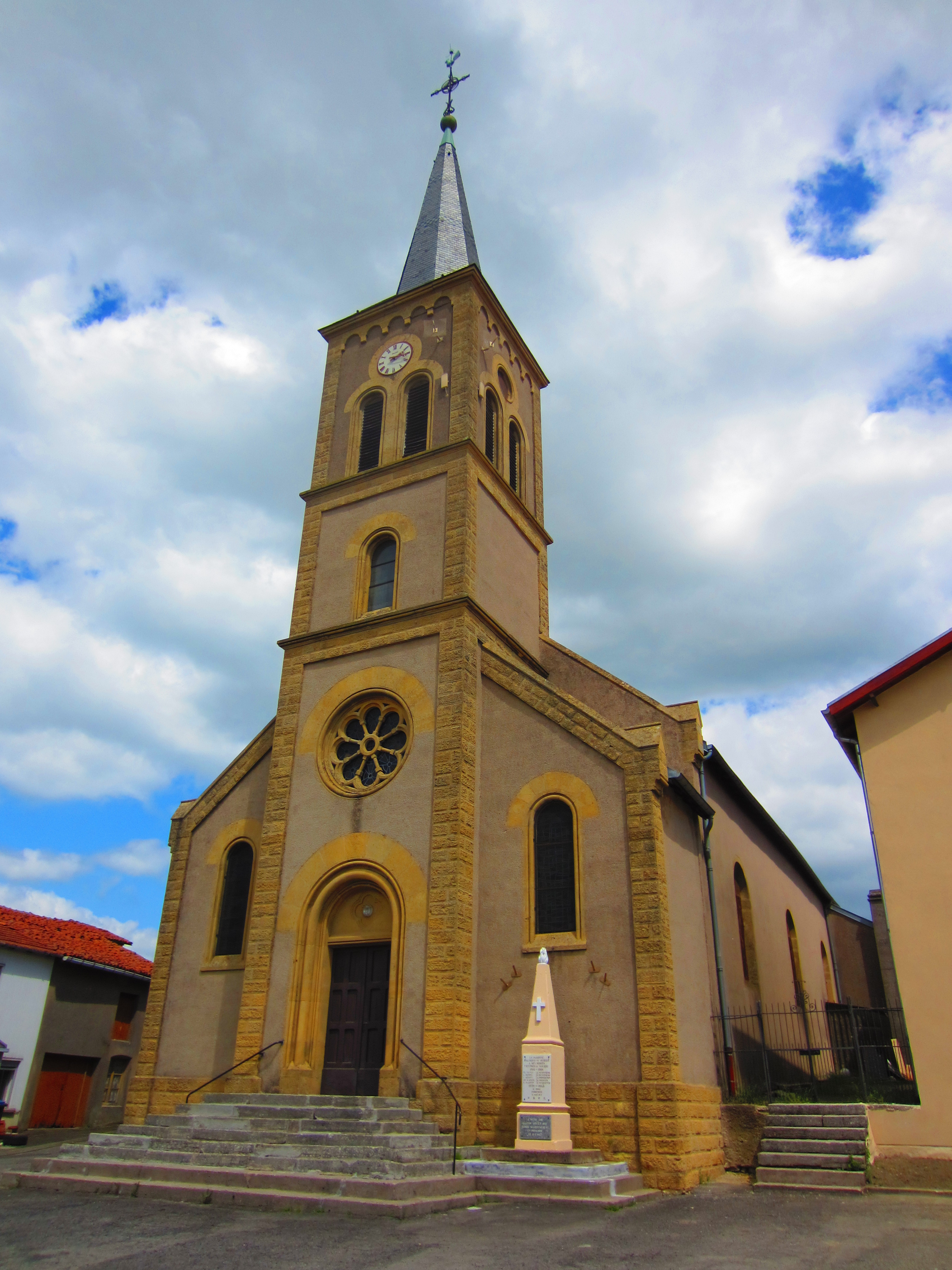
Altroff church

== See also ==
- Communes of the Moselle department
