= Inglange =

- Commune
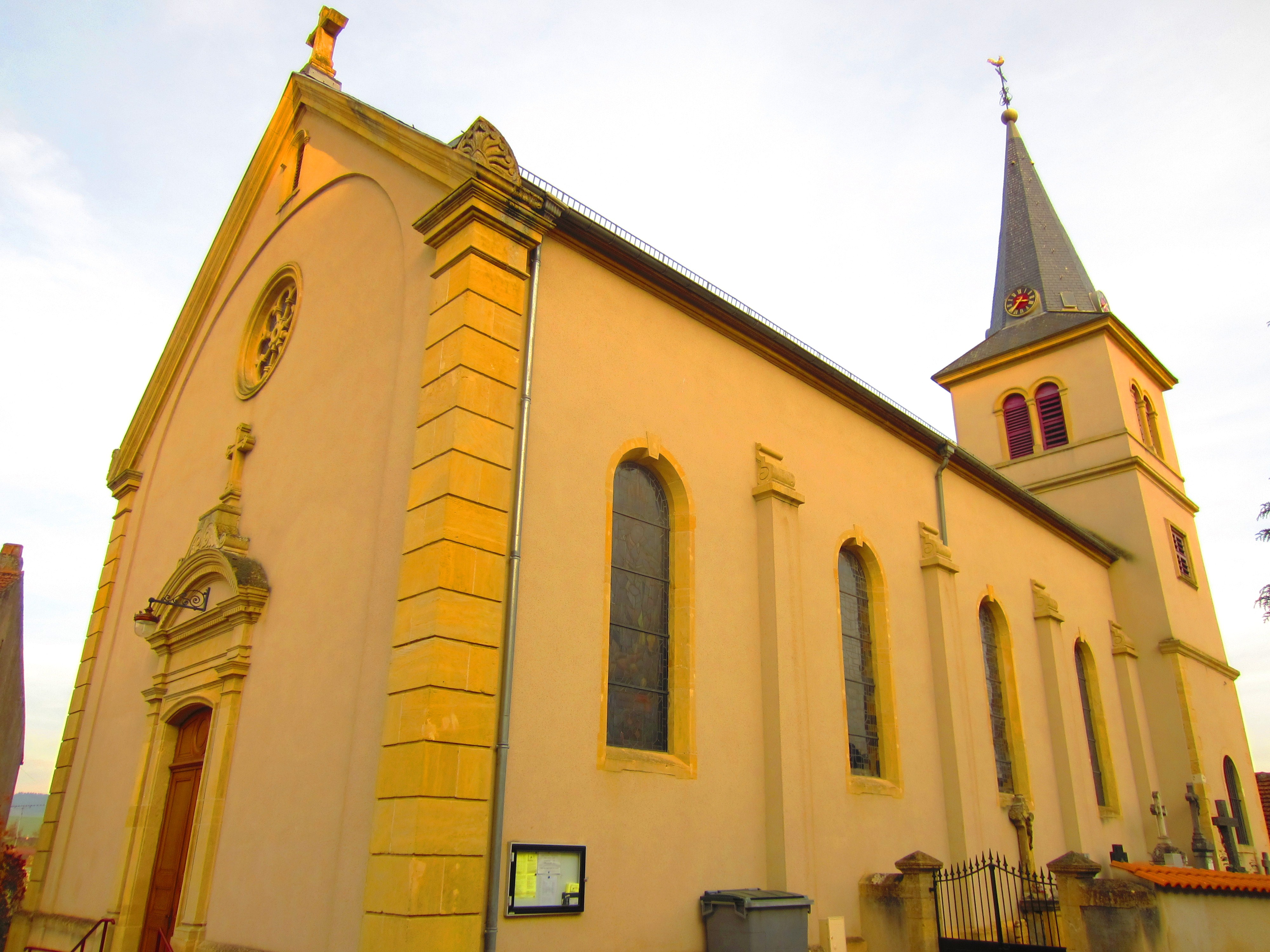
- The church in Inglange

- Coat of arms
- Location of Inglange
- Location within France Location within Grand Est
- Coordinates: 49°20′52″N 6°17′56″E
- Country: France
- Region: Grand Est
- Department: Moselle
- Arrondissement: Thionville
- Canton: Metzervisse
- Intercommunality: CC de l'Arc Mosellan

Government
  - Mayor (2020–2026): Luc Madelaine
- Area^{1}: 5.72 km^{2} (2.21 sq mi)
- Elevation: 150 m (490 ft)
- Highest elevation: 287 m (942 ft)
- Lowest elevation: 164 m (538 ft)
- Population (2023): 386
  - Density: 67.5/km^{2} (175/sq mi)
- Time zone: UTC+01:00 (CET)
  - Summer (DST): UTC+02:00 (CEST)
- INSEE/Postal code: 57345 /57970
- ^{1} French Land Register data, which excludes lakes, ponds, glaciers > 1 km^{2} (0.386 sq mi or 247 acres) and river estuaries.

Inglange (French pronunciation: [ɛ̃ɡlɑ̃ʒ]; German: Inglingen; Lorraine Franconian: Engléngen/Engléng) is a commune in the Moselle department in Grand Est in north-eastern France.

== See also ==
- Communes of the Moselle department
