= Canton of Metzervisse =

Coordinates: 49.31°N 6.28°E

The canton of Metzervisse is an administrative division of the Moselle department, northeastern France. Its borders were not modified at the French canton reorganisation which came into effect in March 2015. Its seat is in Metzervisse.

It consists of the following communes:

1. Aboncourt
2. Basse-Ham
3. Bertrange
4. Bettelainville
5. Bousse
6. Buding
7. Budling
8. Distroff
9. Elzange
10. Guénange
11. Hombourg-Budange
12. Inglange
13. Kédange-sur-Canner
14. Kemplich
15. Klang
16. Kœnigsmacker
17. Kuntzig
18. Luttange
19. Metzeresche
20. Metzervisse
21. Monneren
22. Oudrenne
23. Rurange-lès-Thionville
24. Stuckange
25. Valmestroff
26. Veckring
27. Volstroff
