= Elzange =

- Commune
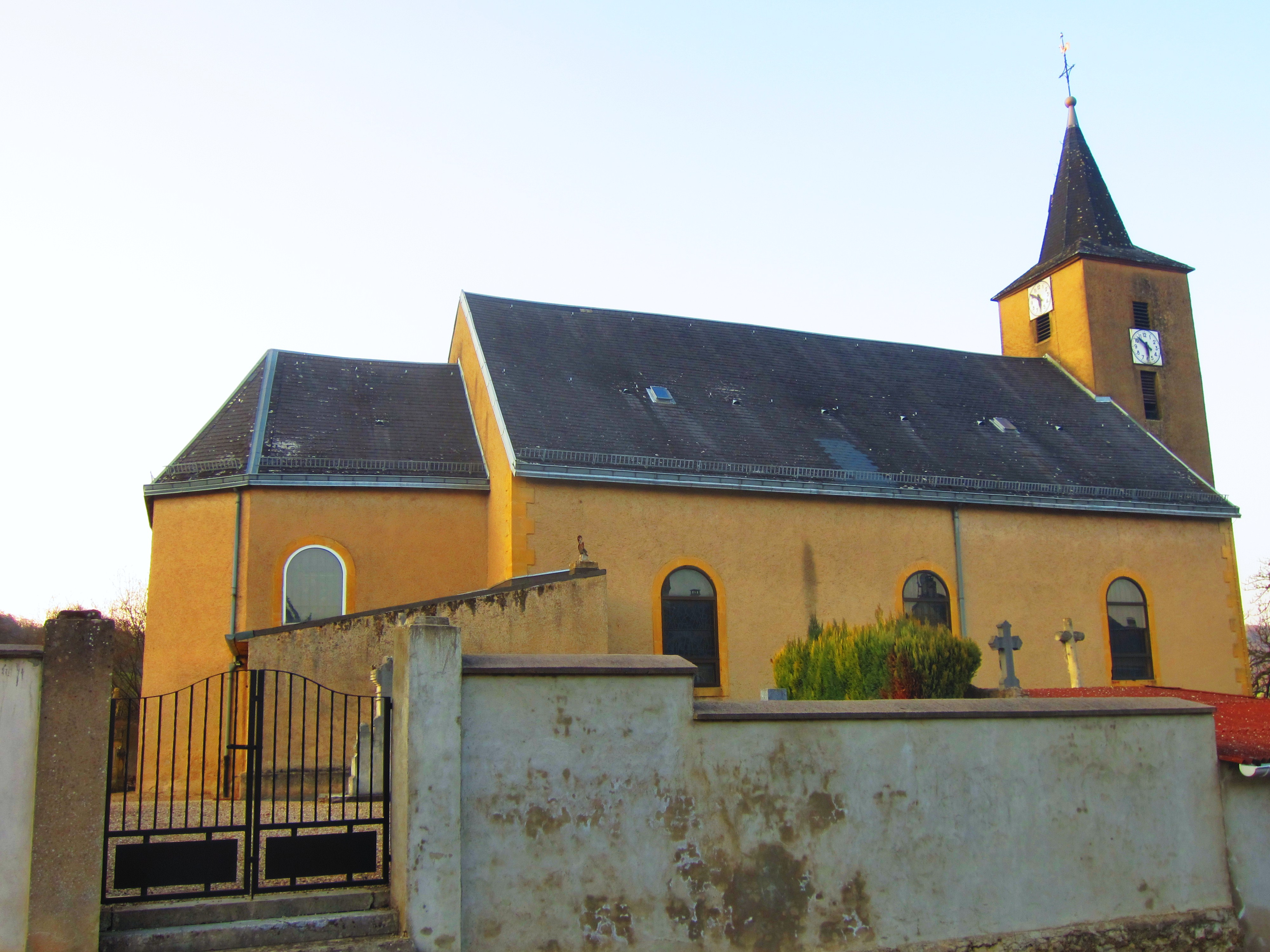
- The church in Elzange

- Coat of arms
- Location of Elzange
- Location within France Location within Grand Est
- Coordinates: 49°21′47″N 6°17′08″E
- Country: France
- Region: Grand Est
- Department: Moselle
- Arrondissement: Thionville
- Canton: Metzervisse
- Intercommunality: CC de l'Arc Mosellan

Government
  - Mayor (2022–2026): Philippe Hanrion
- Area^{1}: 4.01 km^{2} (1.55 sq mi)
- Elevation: 164 m (538 ft)
- Highest elevation: 306 m (1,004 ft)
- Lowest elevation: 157 m (515 ft)
- Population (2023): 666
  - Density: 166/km^{2} (430/sq mi)
- Time zone: UTC+01:00 (CET)
  - Summer (DST): UTC+02:00 (CEST)
- INSEE/Postal code: 57191 /57970
- ^{1} French Land Register data, which excludes lakes, ponds, glaciers > 1 km^{2} (0.386 sq mi or 247 acres) and river estuaries.

Elzange (French pronunciation: [ɛlzɑ̃ʒ]; German: Elsingen) is a commune in the Moselle department in Grand Est in north-eastern France.

== See also ==
- Communes of the Moselle department
