= Rurange-lès-Thionville =

- Commune
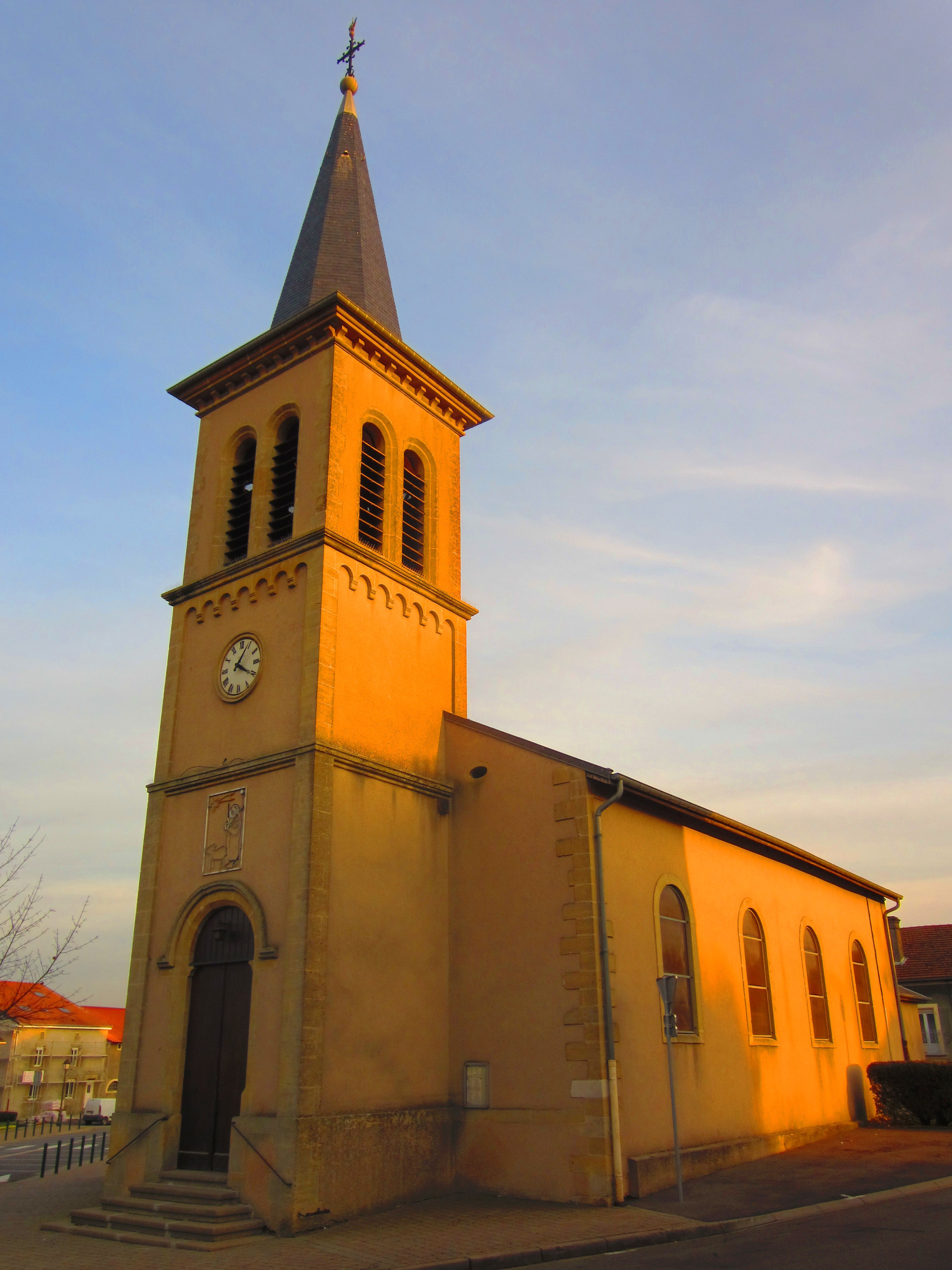
- The church in Rurange-lès-Thionville

- Coat of arms
- Location of Rurange-lès-Thionville
- Location within France Location within Grand Est
- Coordinates: 49°16′40″N 6°14′01″E
- Country: France
- Region: Grand Est
- Department: Moselle
- Arrondissement: Thionville
- Canton: Metzervisse
- Intercommunality: CC de l'Arc Mosellan

Government
  - Mayor (2020–2026): Pierre Rosaire
- Area^{1}: 8.87 km^{2} (3.42 sq mi)
- Elevation: 202 m (663 ft)
- Highest elevation: 231 m (758 ft)
- Lowest elevation: 159 m (522 ft)
- Population (2023): 2,327
  - Density: 262/km^{2} (679/sq mi)
- Time zone: UTC+01:00 (CET)
  - Summer (DST): UTC+02:00 (CEST)
- INSEE/Postal code: 57602 /57310
- ^{1} French Land Register data, which excludes lakes, ponds, glaciers > 1 km^{2} (0.386 sq mi or 247 acres) and river estuaries.

Rurange-lès-Thionville (French pronunciation: [ʁyʁɑ̃ʒ lɛ tjɔ̃vil], literally Rurange near Thionville; German: Rörchingen) is a commune in the Moselle department in Grand Est in north-eastern France.

== Population ==
Historical population
Year	Pop.	±% p.a.
1968	553	—
1975	742	+4.29%
1982	1,044	+5.00%
1990	1,560	+5.15%
1999	1,630	+0.49%
2007	2,051	+2.91%
2012	2,368	+2.92%
2017	2,494	+1.04%
2023	2,327	−1.15%
Source: INSEE

== See also ==
- Communes of the Moselle department
