= Hombourg-Budange =

- Commune
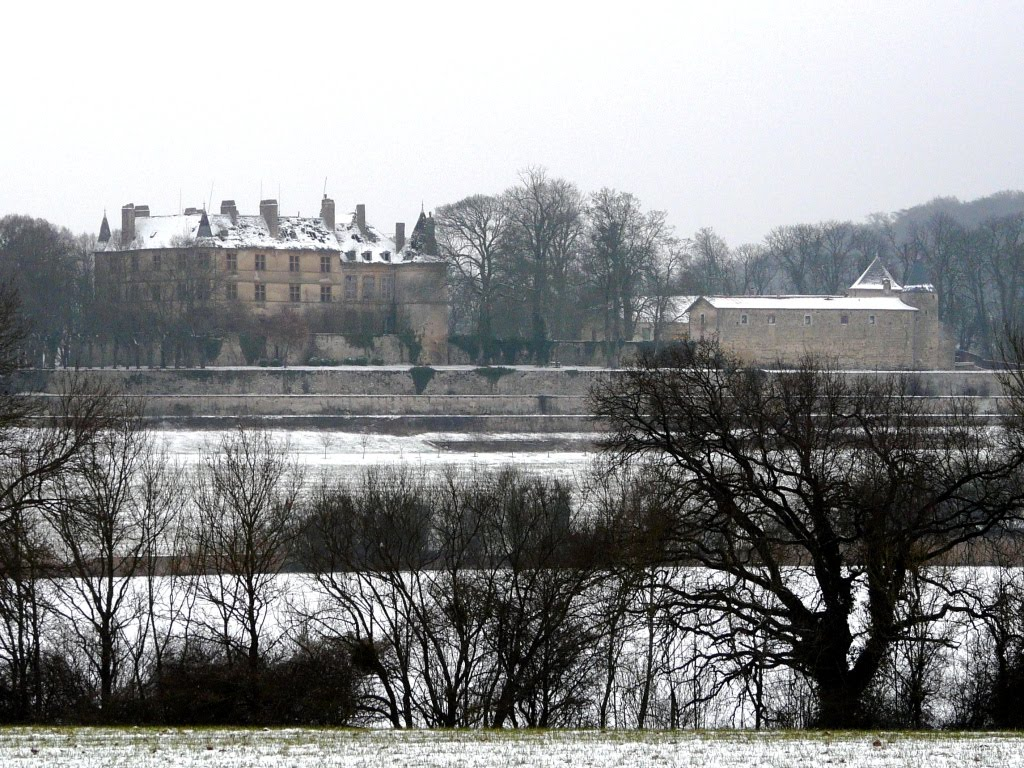
- The chateau of Hombourg-Budange

- Coat of arms
- Location of Hombourg-Budange
- Location within France Location within Grand Est
- Coordinates: 49°17′49″N 6°20′47″E
- Country: France
- Region: Grand Est
- Department: Moselle
- Arrondissement: Thionville
- Canton: Metzervisse
- Intercommunality: CC de l'Arc Mosellan

Government
  - Mayor (2020–2026): Didier Hilbert
- Area^{1}: 15.44 km^{2} (5.96 sq mi)
- Elevation: 280 m (920 ft)
- Highest elevation: 338 m (1,109 ft)
- Lowest elevation: 182 m (597 ft)
- Population (2023): 562
  - Density: 36.4/km^{2} (94.3/sq mi)
- Time zone: UTC+01:00 (CET)
  - Summer (DST): UTC+02:00 (CEST)
- INSEE/Postal code: 57331 /57920
- ^{1} French Land Register data, which excludes lakes, ponds, glaciers > 1 km^{2} (0.386 sq mi or 247 acres) and river estuaries.

Hombourg-Budange (French pronunciation: [ɔ̃buʁ bydɑ̃ʒ]; German: Homburg-Bidingen; Lorraine Franconian: Homréch-Biddéngen) is a commune in the Moselle department in Grand Est in north-eastern France.

== See also ==
- Communes of the Moselle department
