= Veckring =

- Commune
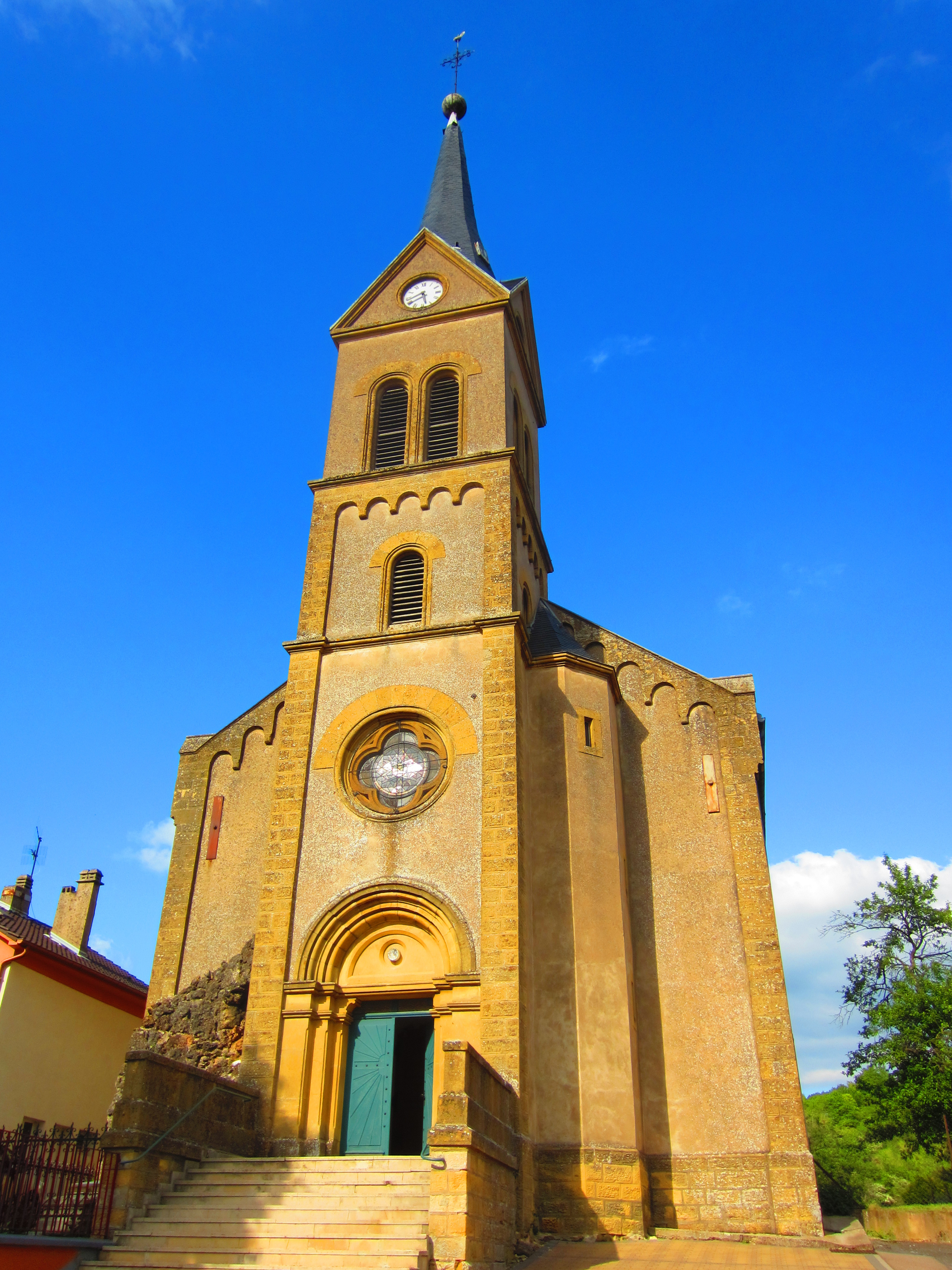
- The church in Veckring

- Coat of arms
- Location of Veckring
- Location within France Location within Grand Est
- Coordinates: 49°20′N 6°23′E
- Country: France
- Region: Grand Est
- Department: Moselle
- Arrondissement: Thionville
- Canton: Metzervisse
- Intercommunality: Arc mosellan

Government
  - Mayor (2020–2026): Pascal Jost
- Area^{1}: 6.65 km^{2} (2.57 sq mi)
- Elevation: 300 m (980 ft)
- Highest elevation: 349 m (1,145 ft)
- Lowest elevation: 185 m (607 ft)
- Population (2023): 659
  - Density: 99.1/km^{2} (257/sq mi)
- Time zone: UTC+01:00 (CET)
  - Summer (DST): UTC+02:00 (CEST)
- INSEE/Postal code: 57704 /57920
- ^{1} French Land Register data, which excludes lakes, ponds, glaciers > 1 km^{2} (0.386 sq mi or 247 acres) and river estuaries.

Veckring (French pronunciation: [vɛkʁɛ̃]; German: Weckringen; Lorraine Franconian : Weckréngen) is a commune in the Moselle department in Grand Est in north-eastern France.

== See also ==
- Communes of the Moselle department
