= Sierck-les-Bains =

- Commune
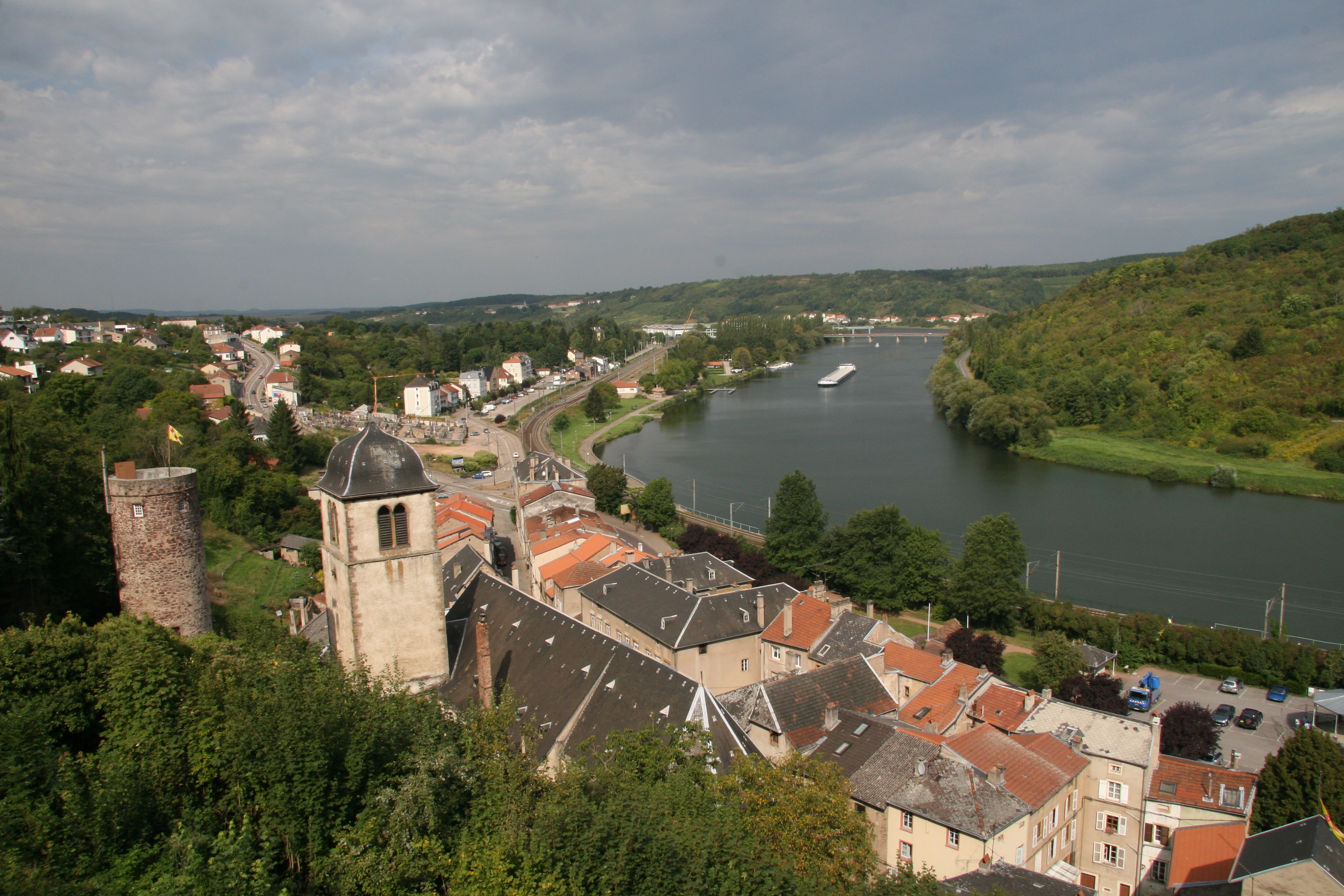
- The western part of Sierck-les-Bains

- Coat of arms
- Location of Sierck-les-Bains
- Location within France Location within Grand Est
- Coordinates: 49°26′35″N 6°21′39″E
- Country: France
- Region: Grand Est
- Department: Moselle
- Arrondissement: Thionville
- Canton: Bouzonville
- Intercommunality: Bouzonvillois-Trois Frontières

Government
  - Mayor (2020–2026): Helen Lambard-Hammond
- Area^{1}: 4.8 km^{2} (1.9 sq mi)
- Highest elevation: 337 m (1,106 ft)
- Lowest elevation: 145 m (476 ft)
- Population (2023): 1,765
  - Density: 370/km^{2} (950/sq mi)
- Time zone: UTC+01:00 (CET)
  - Summer (DST): UTC+02:00 (CEST)
- INSEE/Postal code: 57650 /57480
- ^{1} French Land Register data, which excludes lakes, ponds, glaciers > 1 km^{2} (0.386 sq mi or 247 acres) and river estuaries.

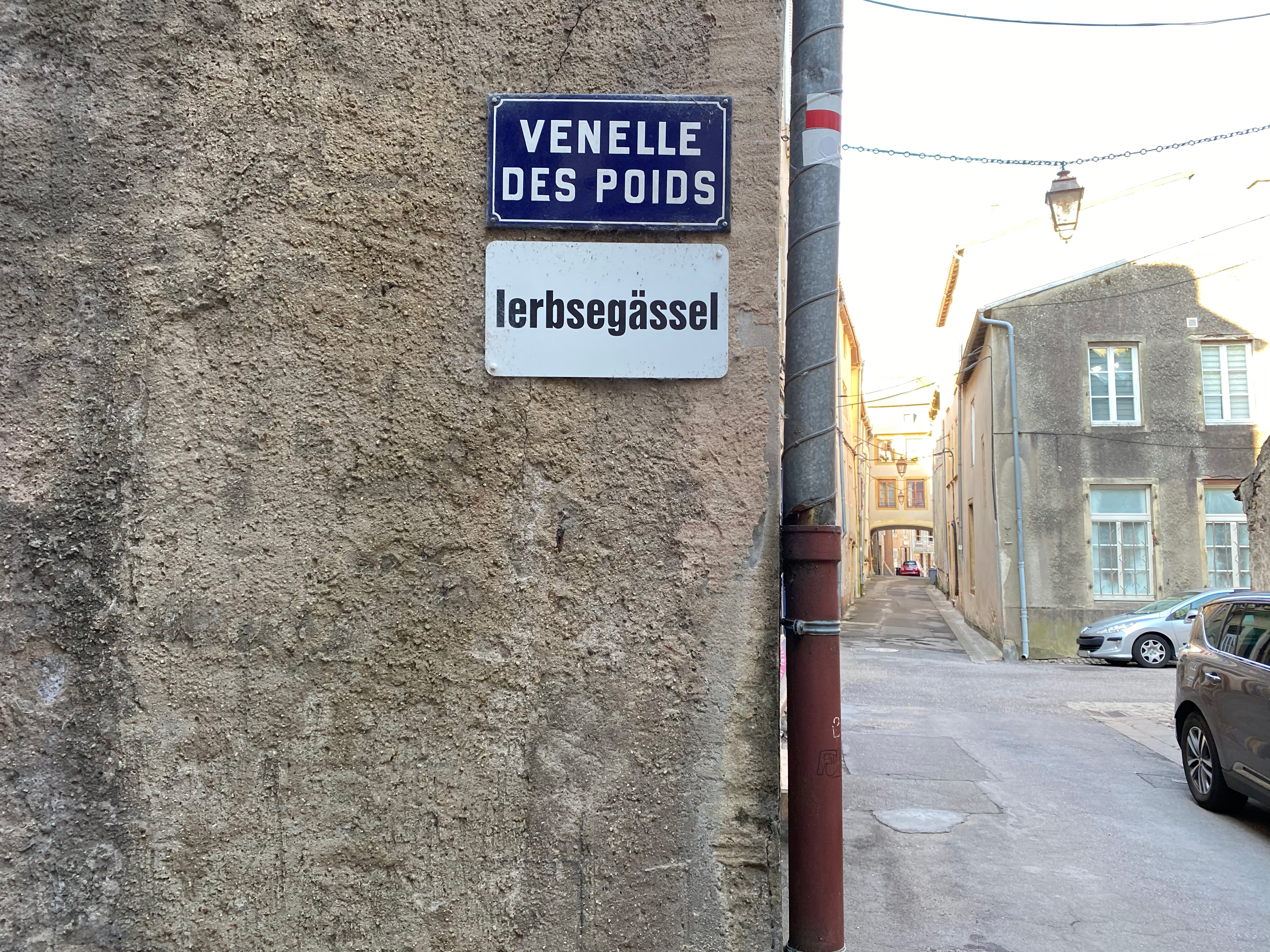
Bilingual street sign in Sierck-les-Bains in both French and Lorraine Franconian

Sierck-les-Bains (French pronunciation: [siʁk le bɛ̃]; German: Bad Sierck; Lorraine Franconian: Siirk/Siirck) is a commune in the Moselle department in Grand Est in north-eastern France. Localities of the commune: Rudling, Kœnigsberg (German: Rudlingen, Königsberg)

== Language Revitalization ==
Sierck-Les-Bains and other municipalities in the Moselle Department of France have attempted some limited projects to protect and revitalize the declining Lorraine-Franconian dialects which were historically spoken in the region. The dialect historically spoken in Sierck is closely related to the Saarländisch dialects and Luxembourgish due to the village’s proximity to the German and Luxembourg borders. Sierck has put up road signs with the Lorraine Franconian name “Siirk” as well as street names in Lorraine Franconian. Such attempts to revitalize the Lorraine Franconian language has also been replicated in other municipalities in the Moselle department such as Hettange-Grande.

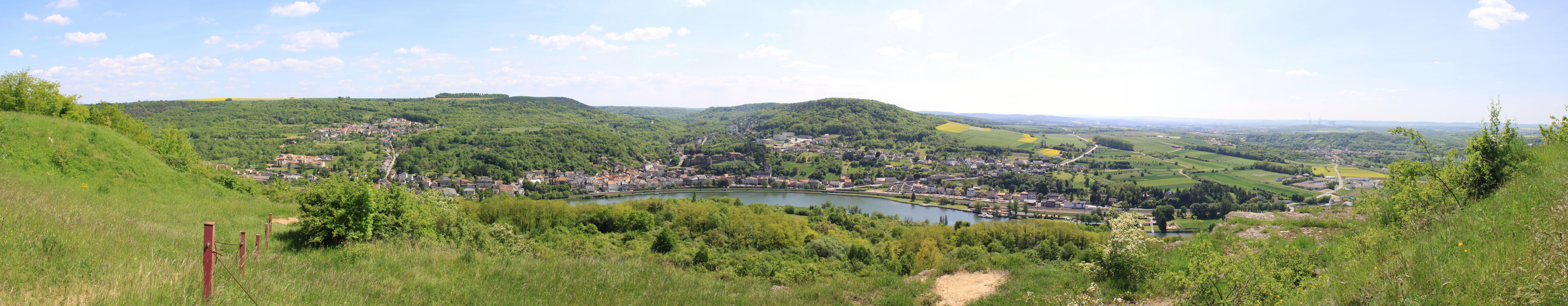
Panorama of Sierck les bains from the Stromberg 180°

== See also ==
- Communes of the Moselle department
