= Luttange =

- Commune
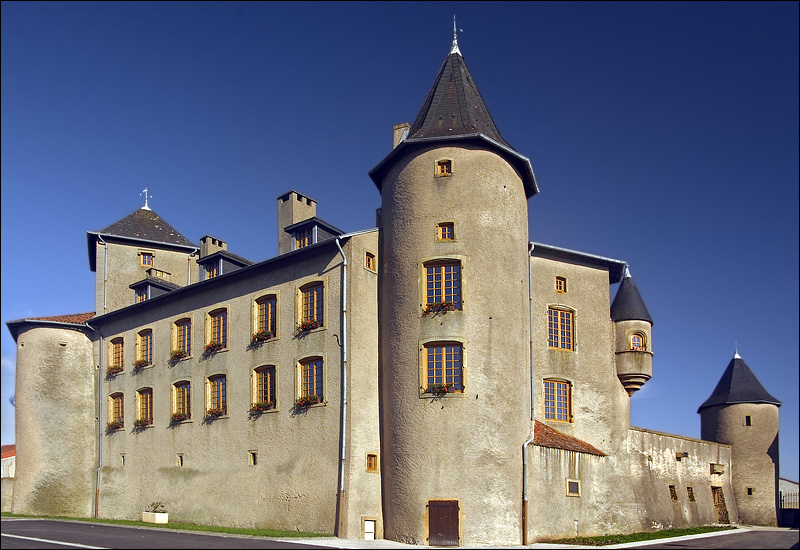
- The chateau in Luttange

- Coat of arms
- Location of Luttange
- Location within France Location within Grand Est
- Coordinates: 49°16′14″N 6°18′43″E
- Country: France
- Region: Grand Est
- Department: Moselle
- Arrondissement: Thionville
- Canton: Metzervisse
- Intercommunality: CC de l'Arc Mosellan

Government
  - Mayor (2020–2026): Paul-André Bauer
- Area^{1}: 12.83 km^{2} (4.95 sq mi)
- Elevation: 295 m (968 ft)
- Highest elevation: 299 m (981 ft)
- Lowest elevation: 195 m (640 ft)
- Population (2023): 983
  - Density: 76.6/km^{2} (198/sq mi)
- Time zone: UTC+01:00 (CET)
  - Summer (DST): UTC+02:00 (CEST)
- INSEE/Postal code: 57426 /57935
- ^{1} French Land Register data, which excludes lakes, ponds, glaciers > 1 km^{2} (0.386 sq mi or 247 acres) and river estuaries.

Luttange (French pronunciation: [lytɑ̃ʒ]; German: Lüttingen; Lorraine Franconian Liténgen/Léiténgen) is a commune in the Moselle department in Grand Est in north-eastern France.

== See also ==
- Communes of the Moselle department
