= Valmestroff =

- Commune
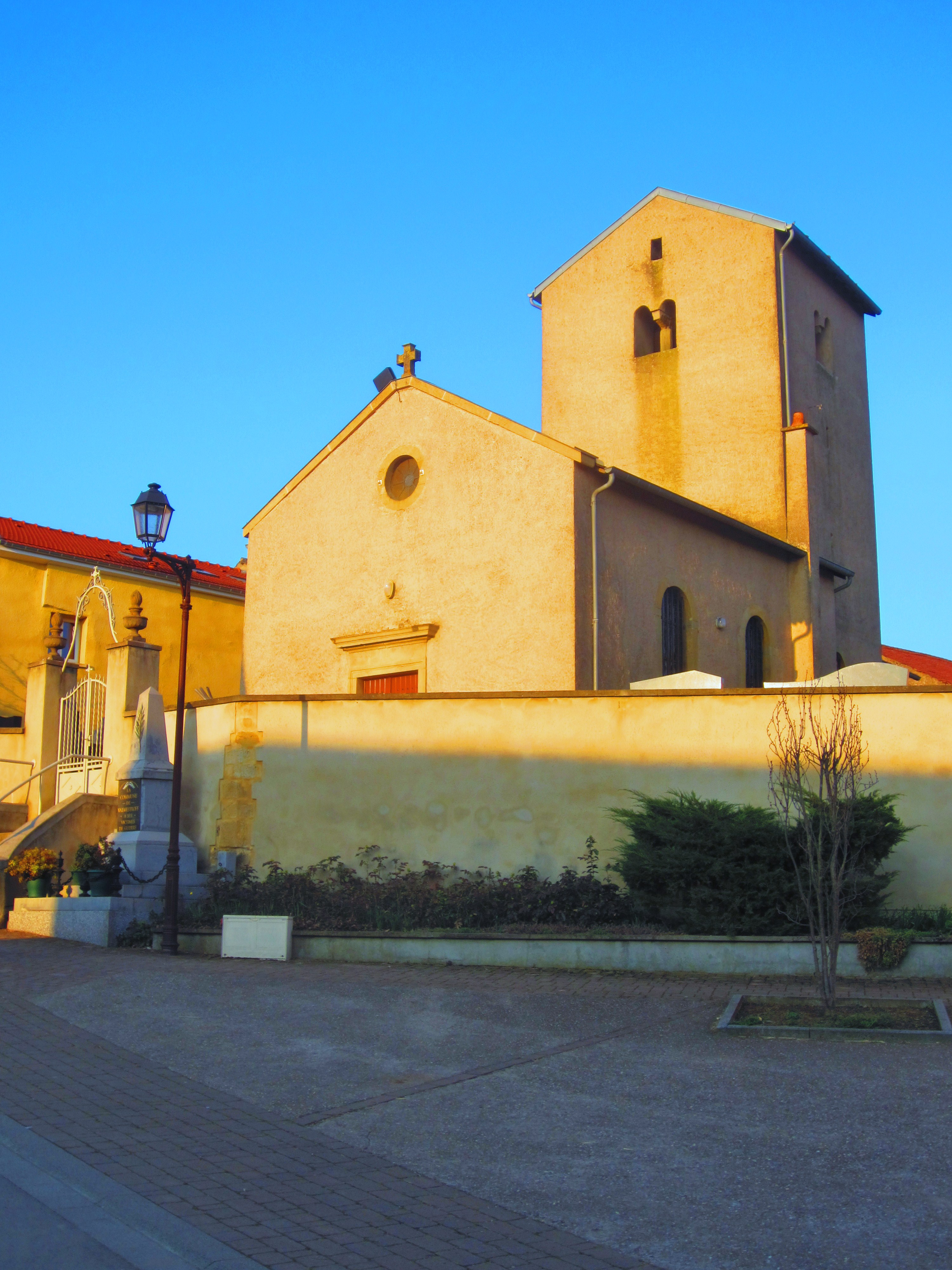
- The church in Valmestroff

- Coat of arms
- Location of Valmestroff
- Location within France Location within Grand Est
- Coordinates: 49°21′41″N 6°15′51″E
- Country: France
- Region: Grand Est
- Department: Moselle
- Arrondissement: Thionville
- Canton: Metzervisse
- Intercommunality: CC de l'Arc mosellan

Government
  - Mayor (2020–2026): Jean Zordan
- Area^{1}: 3.78 km^{2} (1.46 sq mi)
- Elevation: 200 m (660 ft)
- Highest elevation: 256 m (840 ft)
- Lowest elevation: 155 m (509 ft)
- Population (2023): 364
  - Density: 96.3/km^{2} (249/sq mi)
- Time zone: UTC+01:00 (CET)
  - Summer (DST): UTC+02:00 (CEST)
- INSEE/Postal code: 57689 /57970
- ^{1} French Land Register data, which excludes lakes, ponds, glaciers > 1 km^{2} (0.386 sq mi or 247 acres) and river estuaries.

Valmestroff (French pronunciation: [valmɛstʁɔf]; German: Walmesdorf) is a commune in the Moselle department in Grand Est in north-eastern France.

== See also ==
- Communes of the Moselle department
