= Klang, Moselle =

Klang
- Commune
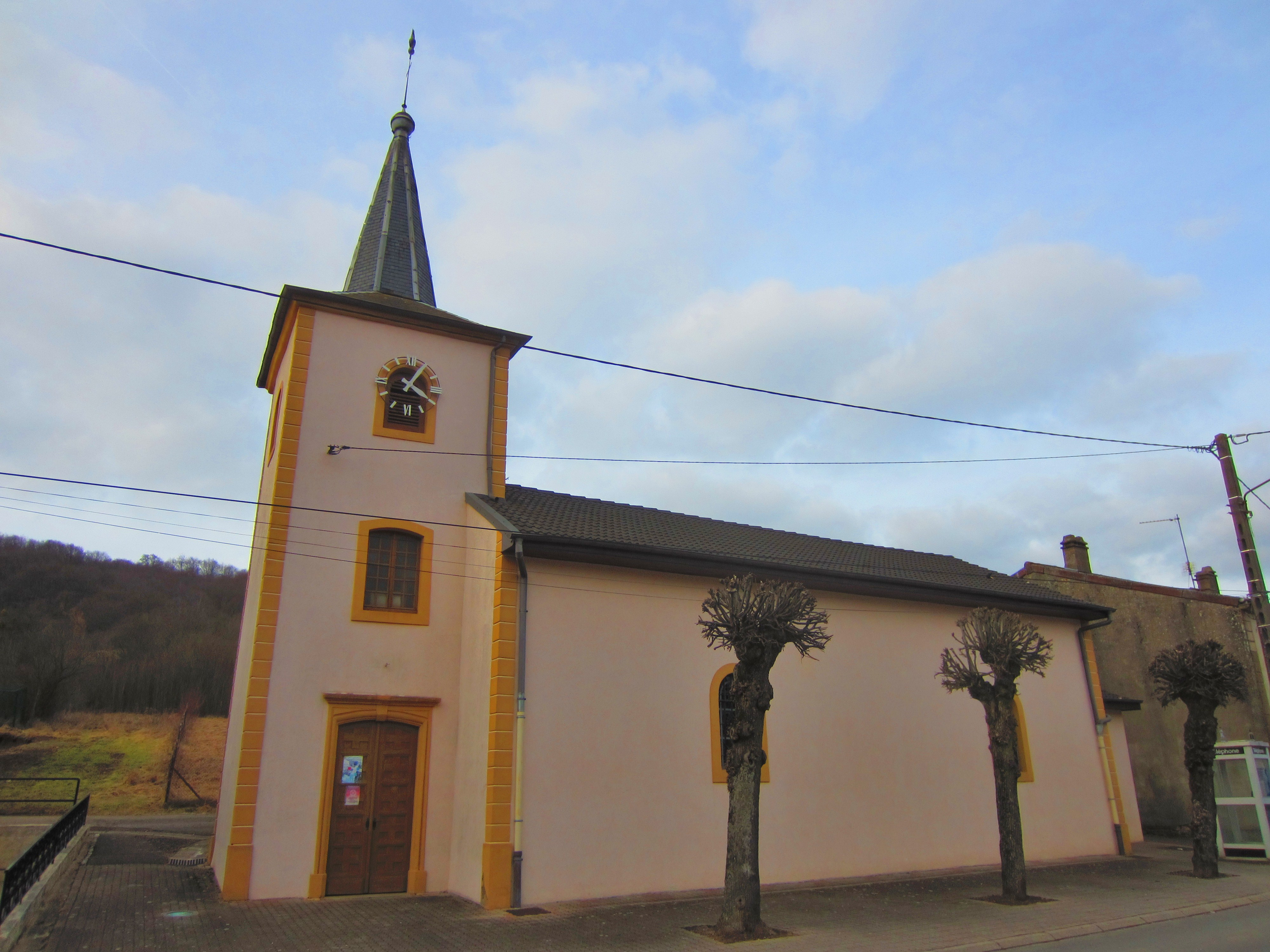
- The chapel in Klang

- Coat of arms
- Location of Klang
- Location within France Location within Grand Est
- Coordinates: 49°19′10″N 6°22′18″E
- Country: France
- Region: Grand Est
- Department: Moselle
- Arrondissement: Thionville
- Canton: Metzervisse
- Intercommunality: Arc mosellan

Government
  - Mayor (2020–2026): André Pierrat
- Area^{1}: 4.19 km^{2} (1.62 sq mi)
- Elevation: 220 m (720 ft)
- Highest elevation: 335 m (1,099 ft)
- Lowest elevation: 195 m (640 ft)
- Population (2023): 208
  - Density: 49.6/km^{2} (129/sq mi)
- Time zone: UTC+01:00 (CET)
  - Summer (DST): UTC+02:00 (CEST)
- INSEE/Postal code: 57367 /57920
- ^{1} French Land Register data, which excludes lakes, ponds, glaciers > 1 km^{2} (0.386 sq mi or 247 acres) and river estuaries.

Klang (French pronunciation: [klɑ̃]; German: Klangen) is a commune in the Moselle department in Grand Est in north-eastern France.

== History ==
The commune was constructed on the ruins of an important village of Gallo-Roman origin. As of 1661, Klang was under the control of France.

== Administration ==
List of mayors
Term	Name
2001–2008	Roger Cridel
2008–incumbent	André Pierrat

== Population ==
Historical population
Year	Pop.	±% p.a.
1968	222	—
1975	237	+0.94%
1982	256	+1.11%
1990	252	−0.20%
1999	236	−0.73%
2007	246	+0.52%
2012	241	−0.41%
2017	239	−0.17%
2023	208	−2.29%
Source: INSEE

== See also ==
- Communes of the Moselle department
