= Monneren =

- Commune
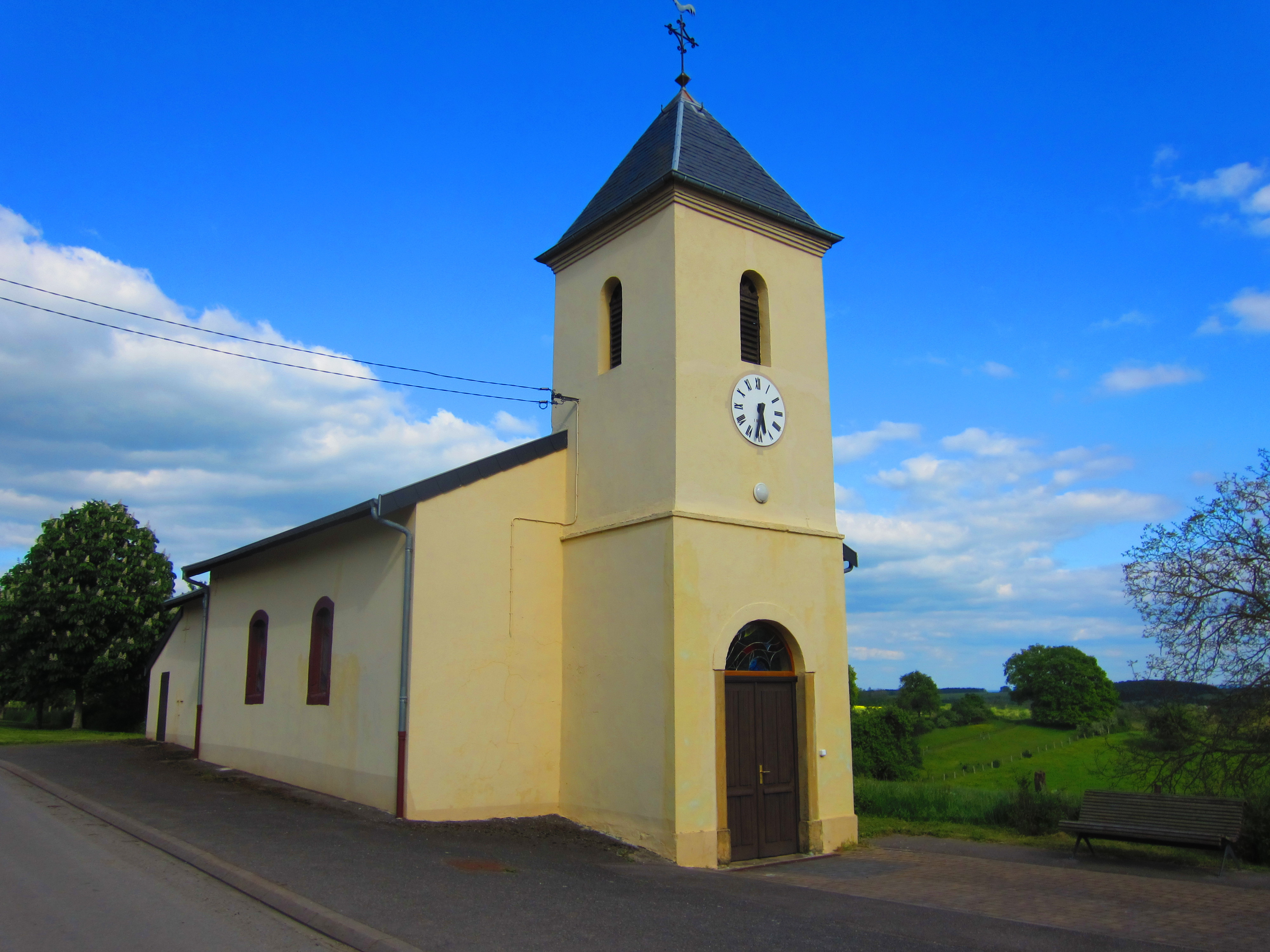
- The chapel in Sainte-Marguerite

- Coat of arms
- Location of Monneren
- Location within France Location within Grand Est
- Coordinates: 49°20′44″N 6°24′57″E
- Country: France
- Region: Grand Est
- Department: Moselle
- Arrondissement: Thionville
- Canton: Metzervisse
- Intercommunality: CC de l'Arc Mosellan

Government
  - Mayor (2020–2026): Paul Schneider
- Area^{1}: 11.06 km^{2} (4.27 sq mi)
- Elevation: 250 m (820 ft)
- Highest elevation: 307 m (1,007 ft)
- Lowest elevation: 231 m (758 ft)
- Population (2023): 398
  - Density: 36.0/km^{2} (93.2/sq mi)
- Time zone: UTC+01:00 (CET)
  - Summer (DST): UTC+02:00 (CEST)
- INSEE/Postal code: 57476 /57920
- ^{1} French Land Register data, which excludes lakes, ponds, glaciers > 1 km^{2} (0.386 sq mi or 247 acres) and river estuaries.

Monneren is a commune in the Moselle department in Grand Est in north-eastern France.

== See also ==
- Communes of the Moselle department
