= Guénange =

- Commune
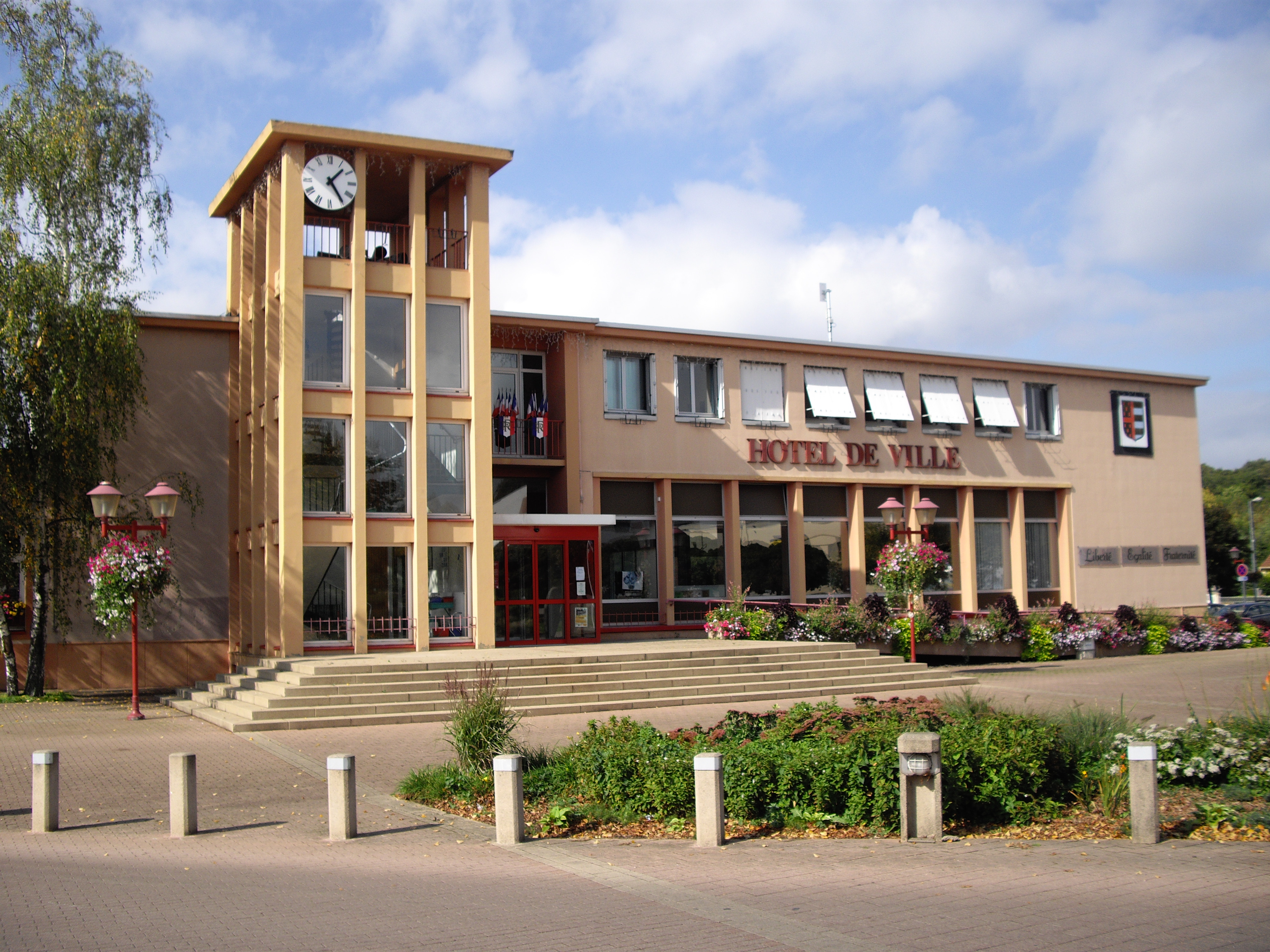
- The town hall in Guénange

- Coat of arms
- Location of Guénange
- Location within France Location within Grand Est
- Coordinates: 49°18′N 6°11′E
- Country: France
- Region: Grand Est
- Department: Moselle
- Arrondissement: Thionville
- Canton: Metzervisse
- Intercommunality: CC de l'Arc Mosellan

Government
  - Mayor (2020–2026): Pierre Tacconi
- Area^{1}: 8.35 km^{2} (3.22 sq mi)
- Elevation: 150 m (490 ft)
- Highest elevation: 233 m (764 ft)
- Lowest elevation: 153 m (502 ft)
- Population (2023): 8,083
  - Density: 968/km^{2} (2,510/sq mi)
- Demonym: Guénangeois
- Time zone: UTC+01:00 (CET)
  - Summer (DST): UTC+02:00 (CEST)
- INSEE/Postal code: 57269 /57310
- Website: www.guenange.fr
- ^{1} French Land Register data, which excludes lakes, ponds, glaciers > 1 km^{2} (0.386 sq mi or 247 acres) and river estuaries.

Guénange (French pronunciation: [ɡenɑ̃ʒ]; German: Niederginingen; Lorraine Franconian: Genéngen/Ginnéngen) is a commune in the Moselle department in Grand Est in north-eastern France.

== Population ==
Historical population
Year	Pop.	±% p.a.
1968	9,862	—
1975	9,397	−0.69%
1982	8,327	−1.71%
1990	6,794	−2.51%
1999	7,124	+0.53%
2007	6,938	−0.33%
2012	7,057	+0.34%
2017	7,210	+0.43%
2023	8,083	+1.92%
Source: INSEE

== See also ==
- Communes of the Moselle department
