= Kédange-sur-Canner =

- Commune
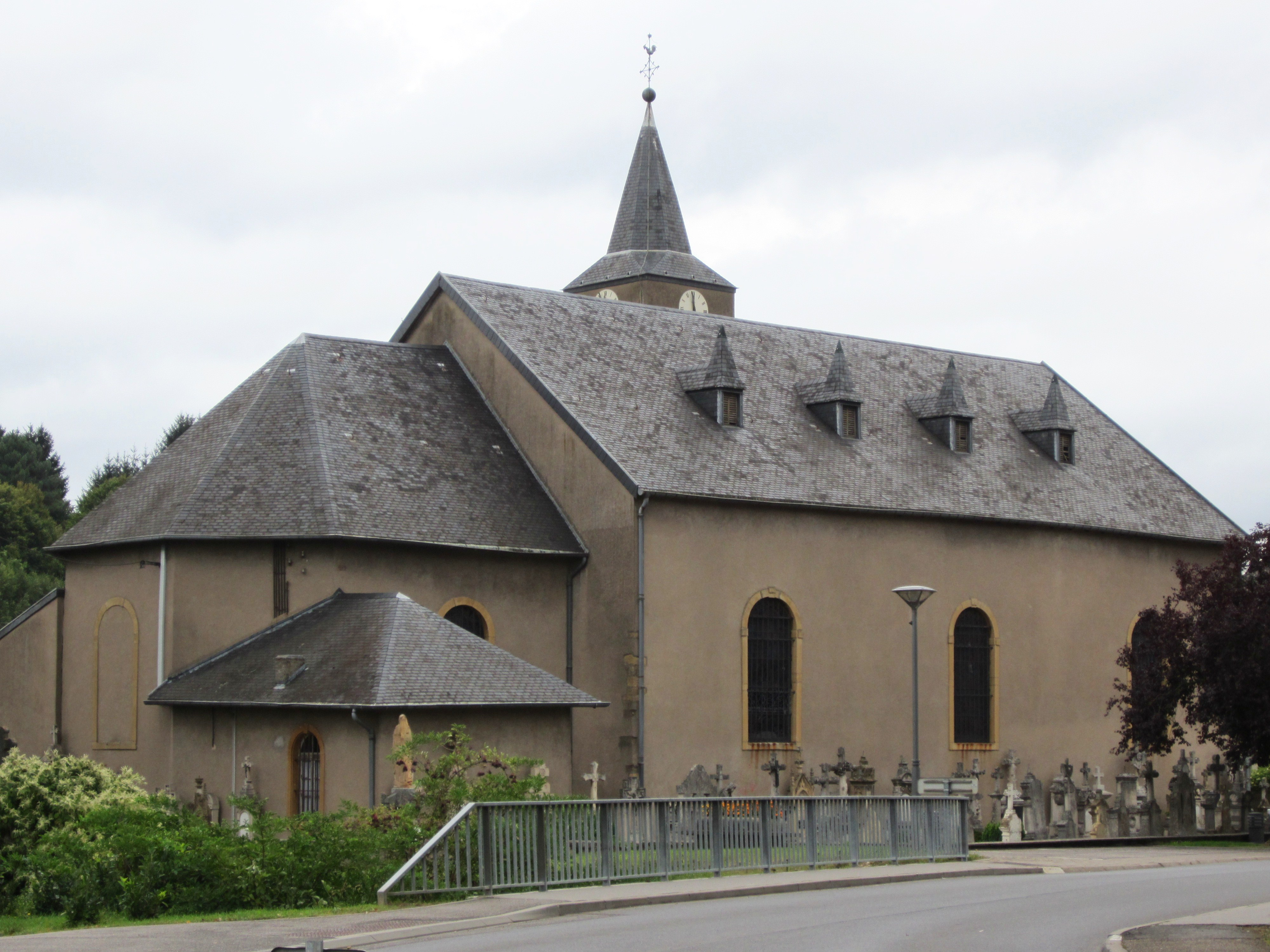
- The church in Kédange-sur-Canner

- Coat of arms
- Location of Kédange-sur-Canner
- Location within France Location within Grand Est
- Coordinates: 49°18′33″N 6°20′27″E
- Country: France
- Region: Grand Est
- Department: Moselle
- Arrondissement: Thionville
- Canton: Metzervisse
- Intercommunality: Arc Mosellan

Government
  - Mayor (2024–2026): Jennifer Haensler
- Area^{1}: 3.91 km^{2} (1.51 sq mi)
- Elevation: 210 m (690 ft)
- Highest elevation: 298 m (978 ft)
- Lowest elevation: 177 m (581 ft)
- Population (2023): 1,121
  - Density: 287/km^{2} (743/sq mi)
- Time zone: UTC+01:00 (CET)
  - Summer (DST): UTC+02:00 (CEST)
- INSEE/Postal code: 57358 /57920
- ^{1} French Land Register data, which excludes lakes, ponds, glaciers > 1 km^{2} (0.386 sq mi or 247 acres) and river estuaries.

Kédange-sur-Canner (French pronunciation: [kedɑ̃ʒ syʁ kanɛʁ]; German: Kedingen; Lorraine Franconian: Kedéngen/Kiedéngen). is a commune in the Moselle department in Grand Est in north-eastern France.

== Population ==
Historical population
Year	Pop.	±% p.a.
1968	797	—
1975	912	+1.94%
1982	1,124	+3.03%
1990	1,078	−0.52%
1999	1,036	−0.44%
2007	1,112	+0.89%
2012	1,078	−0.62%
2017	1,087	+0.17%
2023	1,121	+0.51%
Source: INSEE

== See also ==
- Communes of the Moselle department
