= Metzeresche =

- Commune
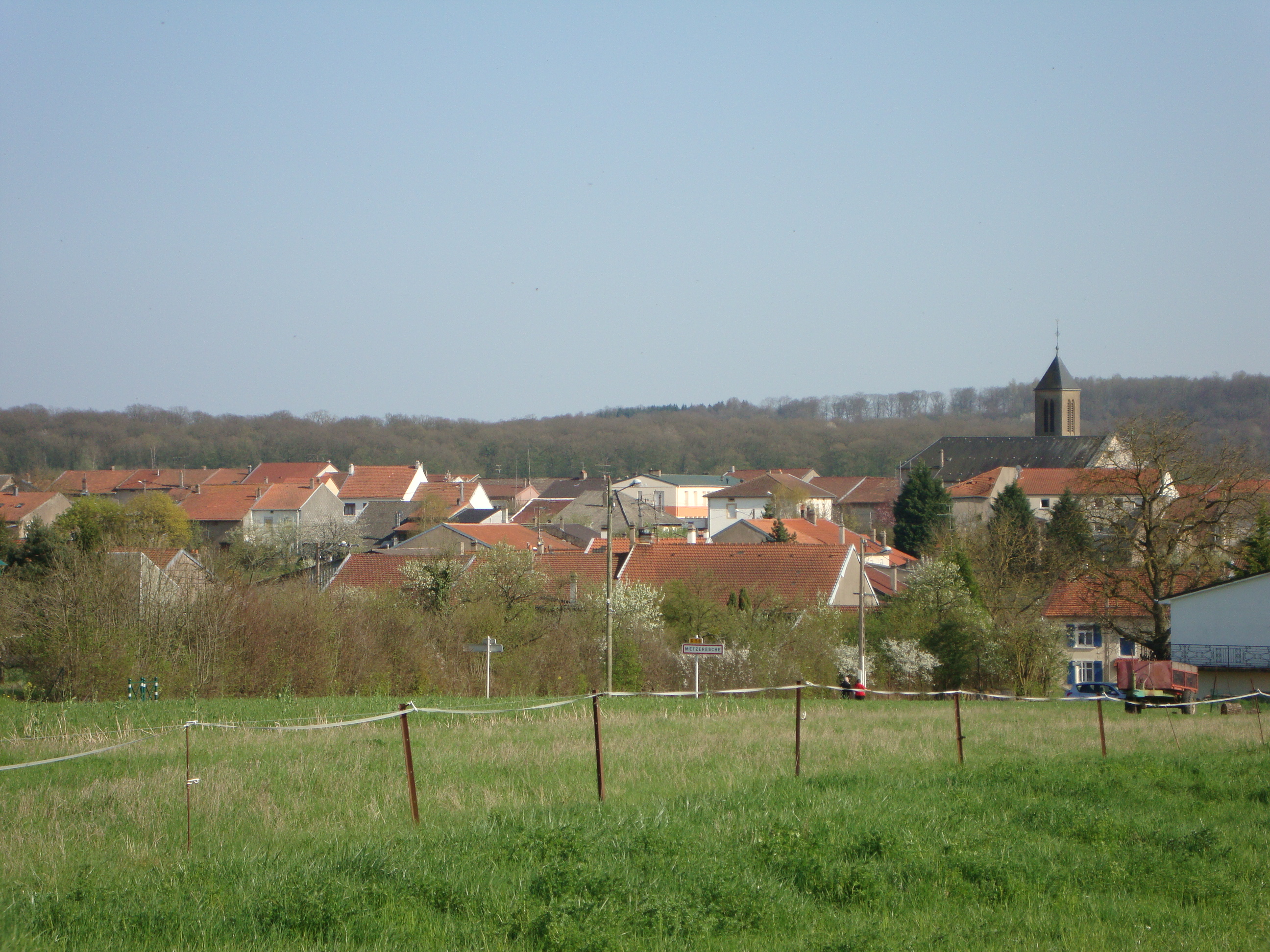
- A general view of Metzeresche

- Coat of arms
- Location of Metzeresche
- Location within France Location within Grand Est
- Coordinates: 49°17′56″N 6°18′32″E
- Country: France
- Region: Grand Est
- Department: Moselle
- Arrondissement: Thionville
- Canton: Metzervisse
- Intercommunality: CC de l'Arc Mosellan

Government
  - Mayor (2020–2026): Hervé Wax
- Area^{1}: 9.56 km^{2} (3.69 sq mi)
- Elevation: 220 m (720 ft)
- Highest elevation: 285 m (935 ft)
- Lowest elevation: 189 m (620 ft)
- Population (2023): 1,020
  - Density: 107/km^{2} (276/sq mi)
- Time zone: UTC+01:00 (CET)
  - Summer (DST): UTC+02:00 (CEST)
- INSEE/Postal code: 57464 /57920
- ^{1} French Land Register data, which excludes lakes, ponds, glaciers > 1 km^{2} (0.386 sq mi or 247 acres) and river estuaries.

Metzeresche (French pronunciation: [mɛtsəʁɛʃ]; 1793: Metzeresch, German: Metzeresch) is a commune in the Moselle department in Grand Est in north-eastern France.

== See also ==
- Communes of the Moselle department
