= Budling =

- Commune
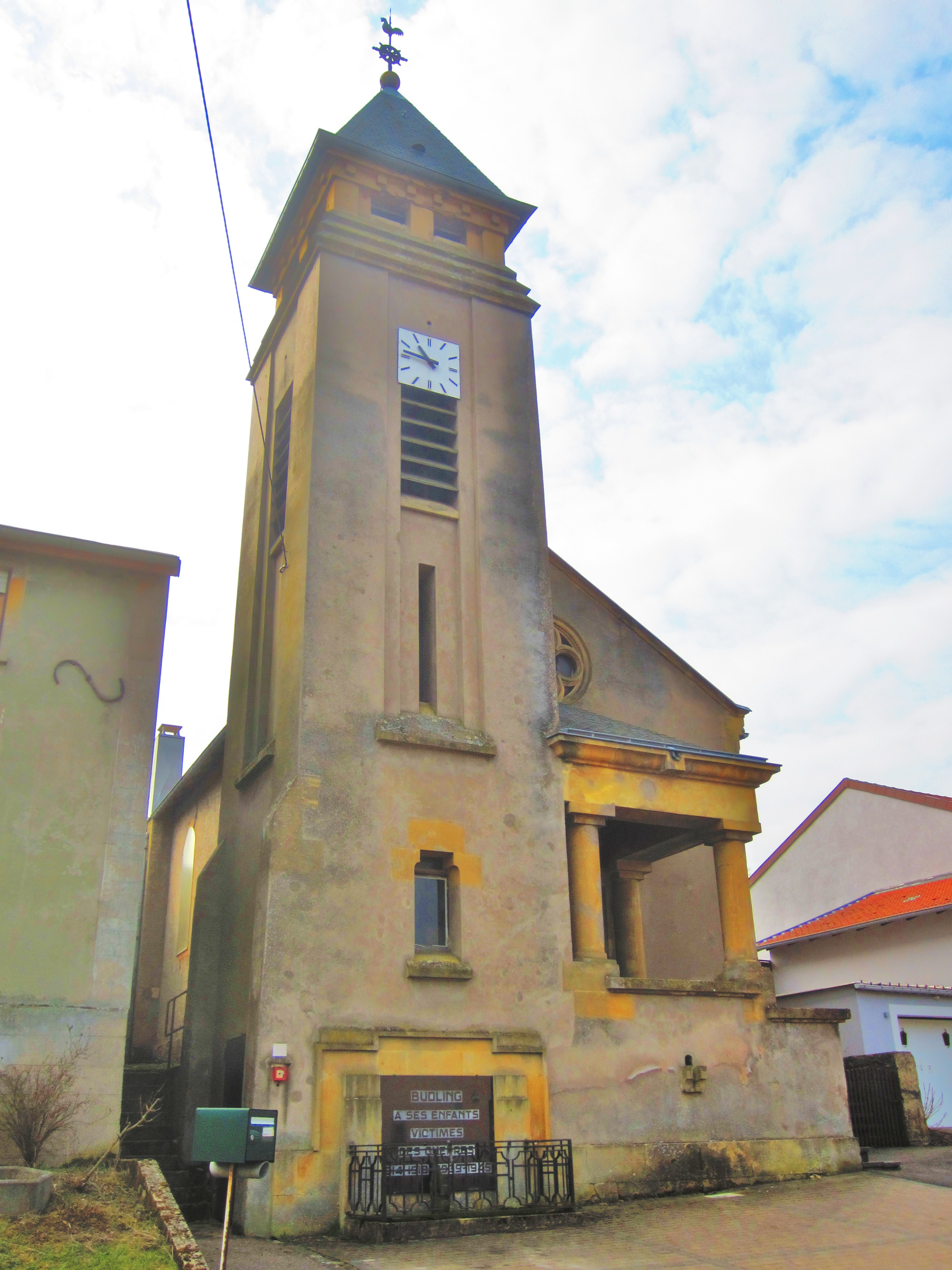
- The church in Budling

- Coat of arms
- Location of Budling
- Location within France Location within Grand Est
- Coordinates: 49°20′51″N 6°21′23″E
- Country: France
- Region: Grand Est
- Department: Moselle
- Arrondissement: Thionville
- Canton: Metzervisse
- Intercommunality: Arc mosellan

Government
  - Mayor (2020–2026): Norbert Guerder
- Area^{1}: 5.73 km^{2} (2.21 sq mi)
- Elevation: 233 m (764 ft)
- Highest elevation: 343 m (1,125 ft)
- Lowest elevation: 176 m (577 ft)
- Population (2023): 165
  - Density: 28.8/km^{2} (74.6/sq mi)
- Time zone: UTC+01:00 (CET)
  - Summer (DST): UTC+02:00 (CEST)
- INSEE/Postal code: 57118 /57970
- ^{1} French Land Register data, which excludes lakes, ponds, glaciers > 1 km^{2} (0.386 sq mi or 247 acres) and river estuaries.

Budling (French pronunciation: [bydlɛ̃]; Lorraine Franconian: Bidléngen; German: Bidlingen) is a commune in the Moselle department in Grand Est, northeastern France.

== Population ==
Historical population
Year	Pop.	±% p.a.
1968	162	—
1975	162	+0.00%
1982	173	+0.94%
1990	158	−1.13%
1999	157	−0.07%
2007	169	+0.92%
2012	179	+1.16%
2017	176	−0.34%
2023	165	−1.07%
Source: INSEE

== See also ==
- Communes of the Moselle department
