= Metzervisse =

- Commune
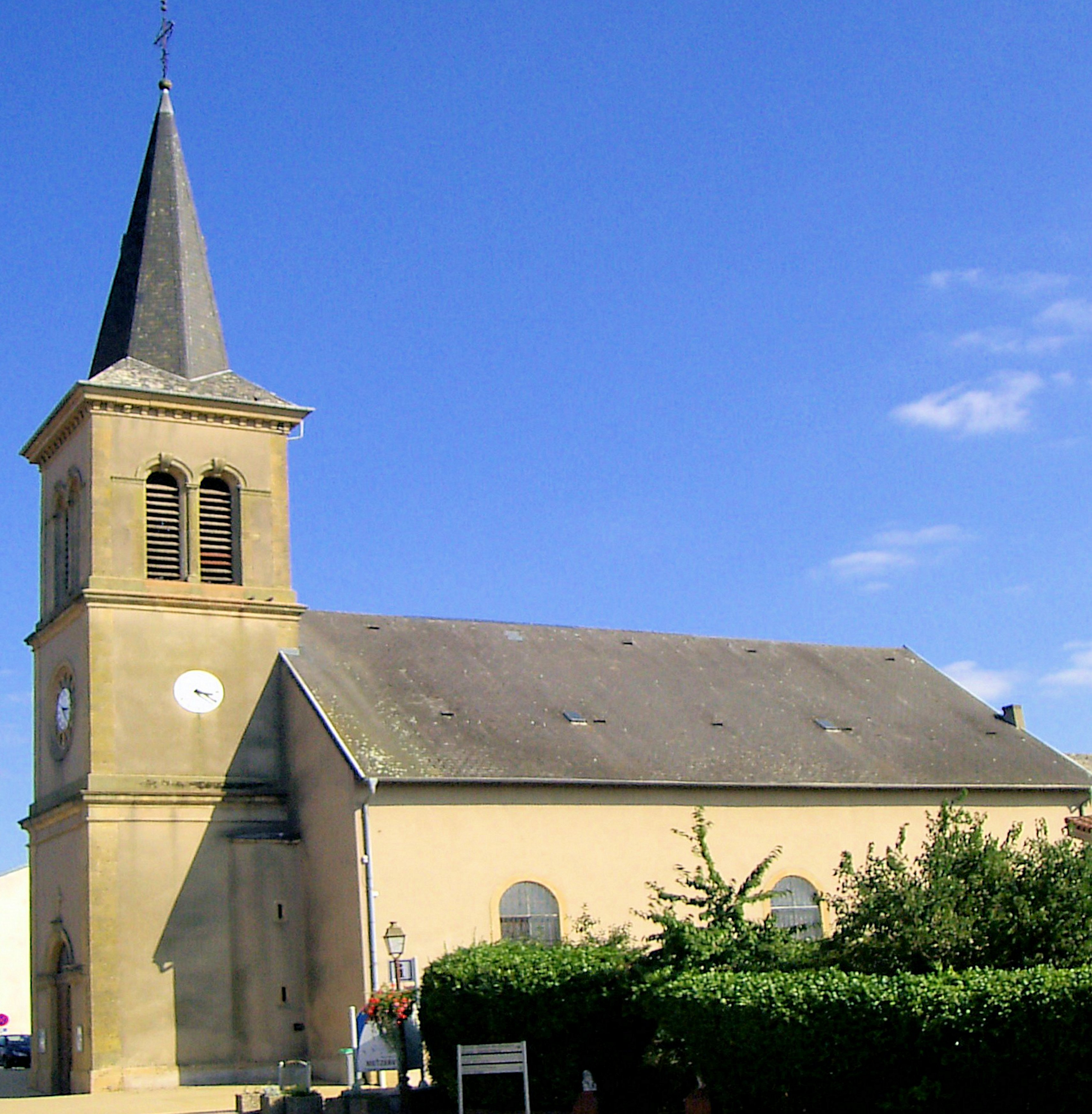
- The church in Metzervisse

- Coat of arms
- Location of Metzervisse
- Location within France Location within Grand Est
- Coordinates: 49°18′57″N 6°17′11″E
- Country: France
- Region: Grand Est
- Department: Moselle
- Arrondissement: Thionville
- Canton: Metzervisse
- Intercommunality: Arc mosellan

Government
  - Mayor (2020–2026): Pierre Heine
- Area^{1}: 8.99 km^{2} (3.47 sq mi)
- Elevation: 251 m (823 ft)
- Highest elevation: 256 m (840 ft)
- Lowest elevation: 173 m (568 ft)
- Population (2023): 2,277
  - Density: 253/km^{2} (656/sq mi)
- Time zone: UTC+01:00 (CET)
  - Summer (DST): UTC+02:00 (CEST)
- INSEE/Postal code: 57465 /57940
- ^{1} French Land Register data, which excludes lakes, ponds, glaciers > 1 km^{2} (0.386 sq mi or 247 acres) and river estuaries.

Metzervisse (French pronunciation: [mɛtsɛʁvis]; German: Metzerwiese; Lorraine Franconian: Metzerwiss) is a commune in the Moselle department in Grand Est in north-eastern France.

== Geography ==
=== Climate ===
The climate in the area is mild with few extremes of temperature and ample precipitation in all months. The Köppen Climate Classification subtype for this climate is "Cfb" (Marine West Coast Climate).

Climate data for Metzervisse, France
Month	Jan	Feb	Mar	Apr	May	Jun	Jul	Aug	Sep	Oct	Nov	Dec	Year
Mean daily maximum °C (°F)	4 (39)	6 (42)	11 (52)	15 (59)	19 (66)	22 (71)	24 (75)	23 (73)	20 (68)	14 (58)	8 (47)	5 (41)	14 (58)
Mean daily minimum °C (°F)	−3 (27)	−2 (28)	1 (33)	3 (37)	7 (44)	10 (50)	12 (53)	11 (52)	9 (49)	5 (41)	2 (35)	0 (32)	4 (40)
Average precipitation mm (inches)	58 (2.3)	56 (2.2)	43 (1.7)	48 (1.9)	74 (2.9)	74 (2.9)	64 (2.5)	94 (3.7)	81 (3.2)	56 (2.2)	64 (2.5)	76 (3)	790 (31)
Source: Weatherbase

== Population ==
Historical population
Year	Pop.	±% p.a.
1968	1,156	—
1975	1,115	−0.51%
1982	1,169	+0.68%
1990	1,157	−0.13%
1999	1,271	+1.05%
2007	1,612	+3.02%
2012	1,986	+4.26%
2017	2,271	+2.72%
2023	2,277	+0.04%
Source: INSEE

== See also ==
- Communes of the Moselle department
