= Beux =

- Commune
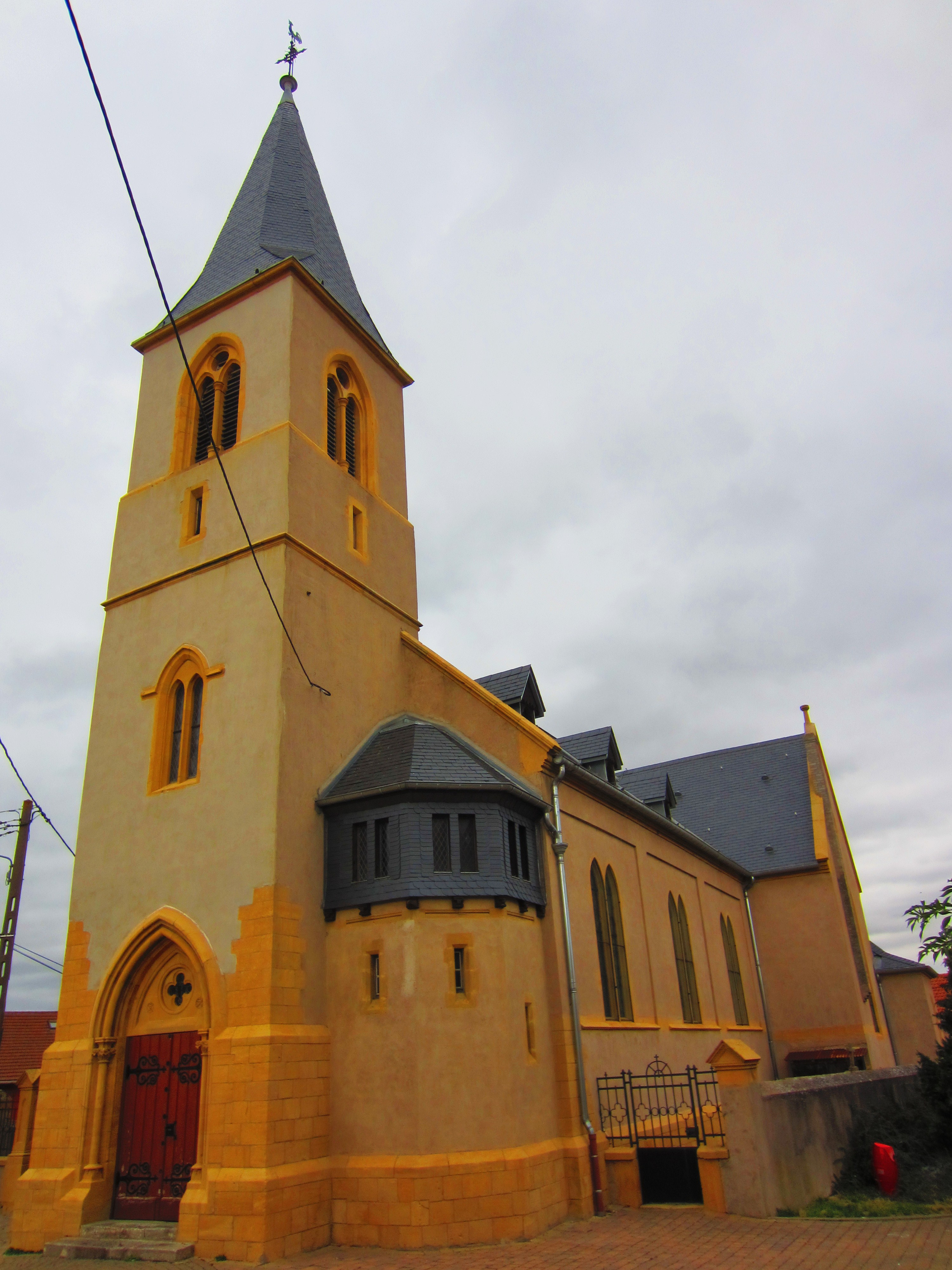
- The church in Beux

- Coat of arms
- Location of Beux
- Location within France Location within Grand Est
- Coordinates: 49°00′01″N 6°19′03″E
- Country: France
- Region: Grand Est
- Department: Moselle
- Arrondissement: Metz
- Canton: Faulquemont

Government
  - Mayor (2020–2026): Bernard Guitter
- Area^{1}: 5.03 km^{2} (1.94 sq mi)
- Elevation: 250 m (820 ft)
- Highest elevation: 315 m (1,033 ft)
- Lowest elevation: 233 m (764 ft)
- Population (2023): 296
  - Density: 58.8/km^{2} (152/sq mi)
- Time zone: UTC+01:00 (CET)
  - Summer (DST): UTC+02:00 (CEST)
- INSEE/Postal code: 57075 /57580
- ^{1} French Land Register data, which excludes lakes, ponds, glaciers > 1 km^{2} (0.386 sq mi or 247 acres) and river estuaries.

Beux (French pronunciation: [bø]; German: Niederbö) is a commune in the Moselle department in Grand Est in northeastern France.

== Population ==
Historical population
Year	Pop.	±% p.a.
1968	119	—
1975	142	+2.56%
1982	193	+4.48%
1990	207	+0.88%
1999	212	+0.27%
2007	236	+1.35%
2012	274	+3.03%
2017	274	+0.00%
2023	296	+1.30%
Source: INSEE

== See also ==
- Communes of the Moselle department
