= Orny, Moselle =

Orny
- Commune
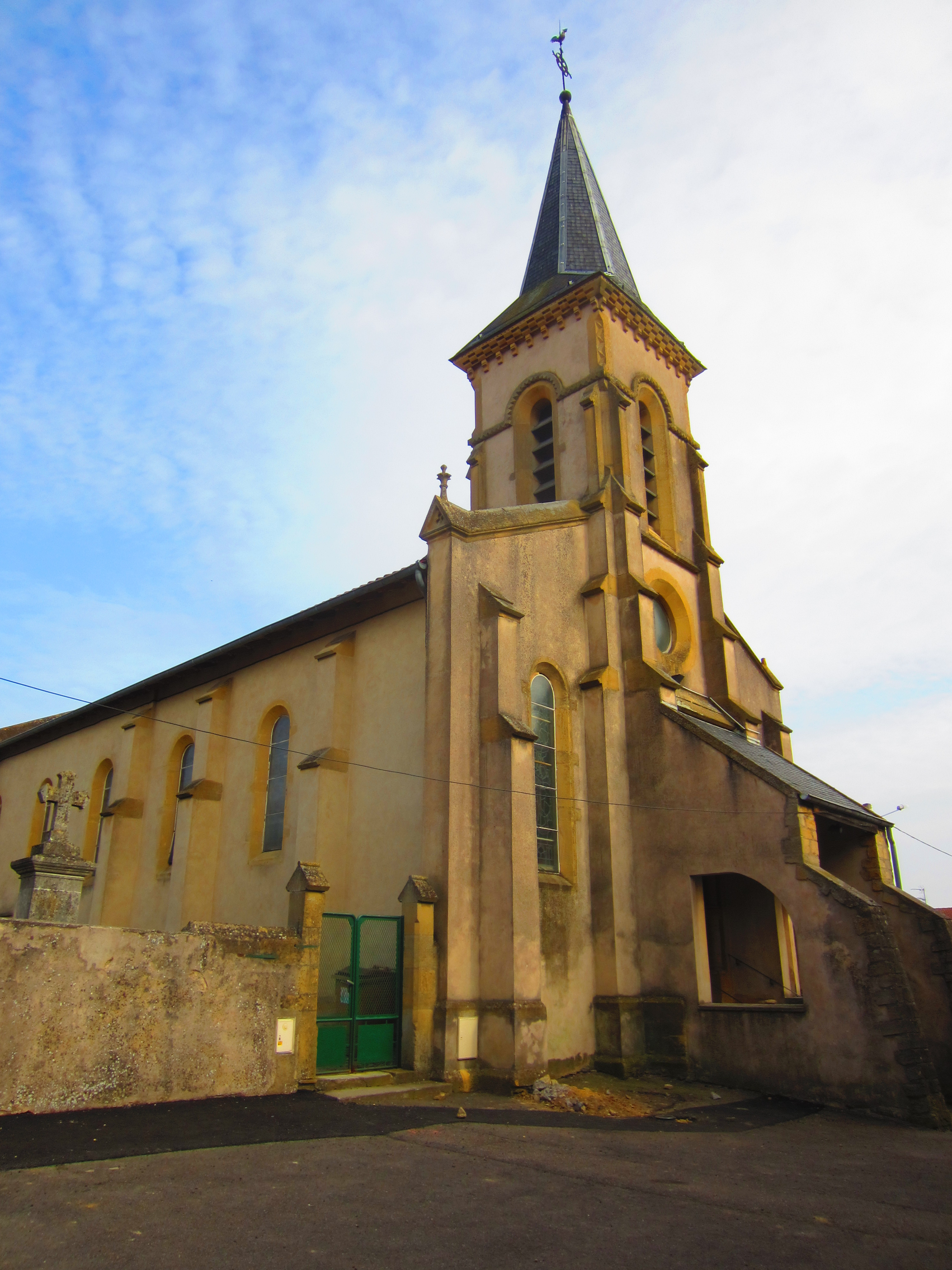
- The church in Orny

- Coat of arms
- Location of Orny
- Location within France Location within Grand Est
- Coordinates: 49°01′23″N 6°14′44″E
- Country: France
- Region: Grand Est
- Department: Moselle
- Arrondissement: Metz
- Canton: Faulquemont
- Intercommunality: Sud Messin

Government
  - Mayor (2020–2026): Jacques Bouches
- Area^{1}: 7.3 km^{2} (2.8 sq mi)
- Elevation: 250 m (820 ft)
- Highest elevation: 271 m (889 ft)
- Lowest elevation: 210 m (690 ft)
- Population (2023): 448
  - Density: 61/km^{2} (160/sq mi)
- Time zone: UTC+01:00 (CET)
  - Summer (DST): UTC+02:00 (CEST)
- INSEE/Postal code: 57527 /57420
- ^{1} French Land Register data, which excludes lakes, ponds, glaciers > 1 km^{2} (0.386 sq mi or 247 acres) and river estuaries.

Orny (French pronunciation: [ɔʁni]; German: Ornach) is a commune in the Moselle department in Grand Est in north-eastern France.

== See also ==
- Communes of the Moselle department
