= Laudrefang =

- Commune
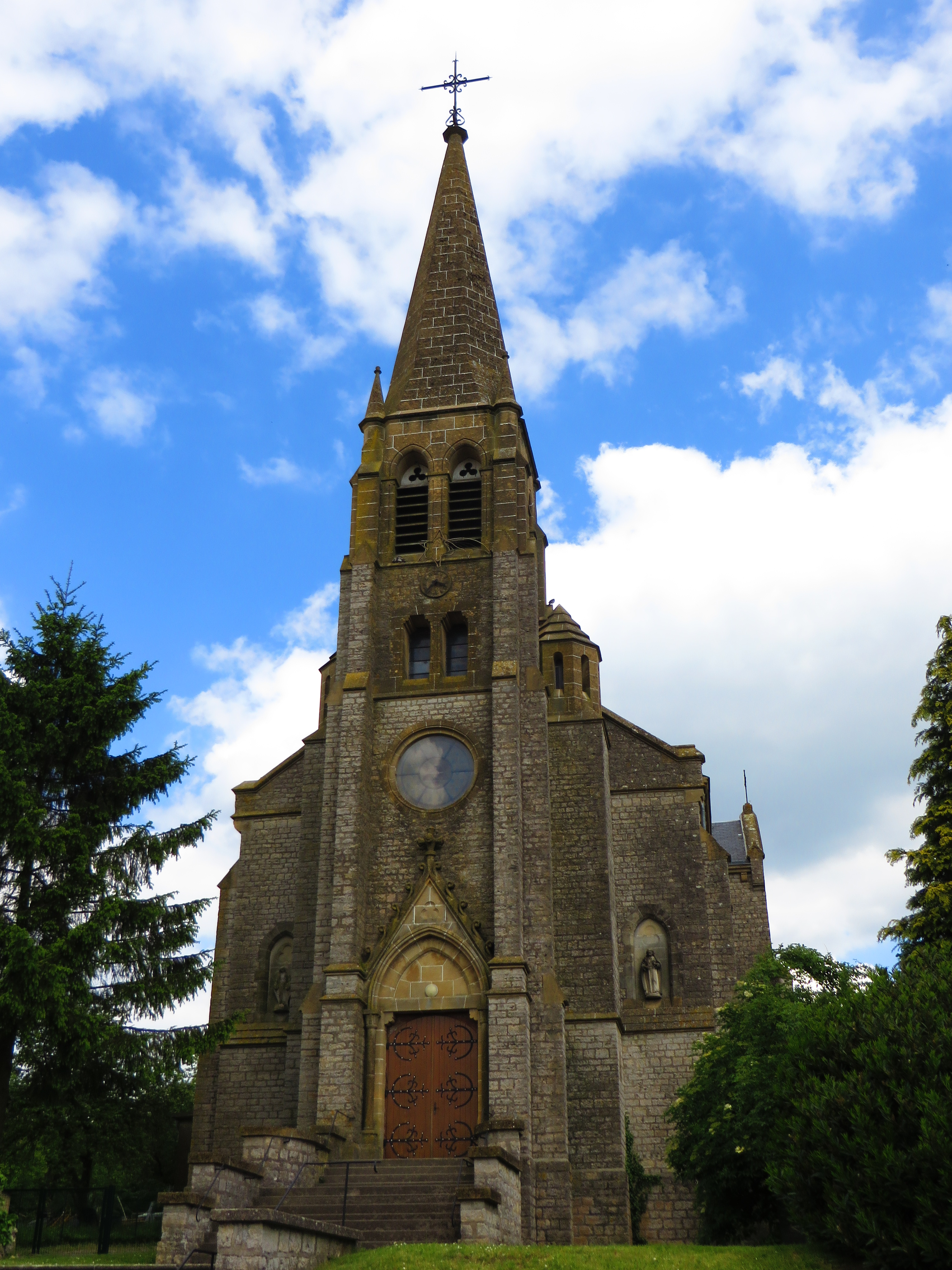
- The church in Laudrefang

- Coat of arms
- Location of Laudrefang
- Location within France Location within Grand Est
- Coordinates: 49°05′01″N 6°38′27″E
- Country: France
- Region: Grand Est
- Department: Moselle
- Arrondissement: Forbach-Boulay-Moselle
- Canton: Faulquemont
- Intercommunality: CC District urbain de Faulquemont

Government
  - Mayor (2020–2026): Geneviève Thil
- Area^{1}: 4.7 km^{2} (1.8 sq mi)
- Elevation: 300 m (980 ft)
- Highest elevation: 394 m (1,293 ft)
- Lowest elevation: 305 m (1,001 ft)
- Population (2023): 335
  - Density: 71/km^{2} (180/sq mi)
- Time zone: UTC+01:00 (CET)
  - Summer (DST): UTC+02:00 (CEST)
- INSEE/Postal code: 57386 /57385
- ^{1} French Land Register data, which excludes lakes, ponds, glaciers > 1 km^{2} (0.386 sq mi or 247 acres) and river estuaries.

Laudrefang (French pronunciation: [lodʁəfɑ̃]; German: Lauterfangen) is a commune in the Moselle department in Grand Est in north-eastern France.

== See also ==
- Communes of the Moselle department
