= Pagny-lès-Goin =

- Commune
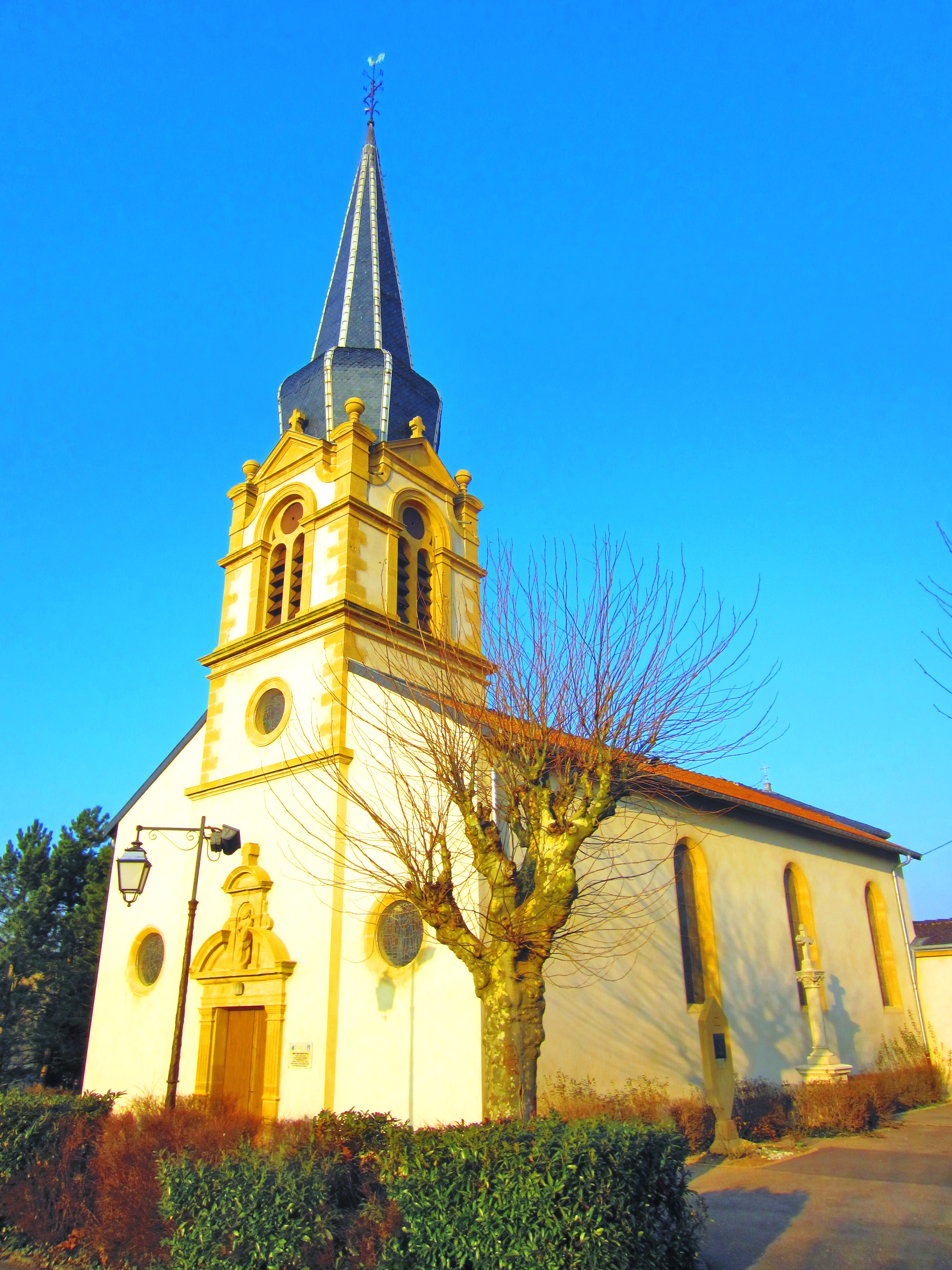
- The church in Pagny-lès-Goin

- Coat of arms
- Location of Pagny-lès-Goin
- Location within France Location within Grand Est
- Coordinates: 48°58′22″N 6°13′12″E
- Country: France
- Region: Grand Est
- Department: Moselle
- Arrondissement: Metz
- Canton: Faulquemont
- Intercommunality: Sud Messin

Government
  - Mayor (2020–2026): Frédéric Reichelt
- Area^{1}: 5.17 km^{2} (2.00 sq mi)
- Elevation: 220 m (720 ft)
- Highest elevation: 266 m (873 ft)
- Lowest elevation: 200 m (660 ft)
- Population (2023): 225
  - Density: 43.5/km^{2} (113/sq mi)
- Time zone: UTC+01:00 (CET)
  - Summer (DST): UTC+02:00 (CEST)
- INSEE/Postal code: 57532 /57420
- ^{1} French Land Register data, which excludes lakes, ponds, glaciers > 1 km^{2} (0.386 sq mi or 247 acres) and river estuaries.

Pagny-lès-Goin (French pronunciation: [paɲi lɛ ɡwɛ̃], literally Pagny near Goin; German: Paningen) is a commune in the Moselle department in Grand Est in north-eastern France.

== See also ==
- Communes of the Moselle department
