= Herny =

- Commune
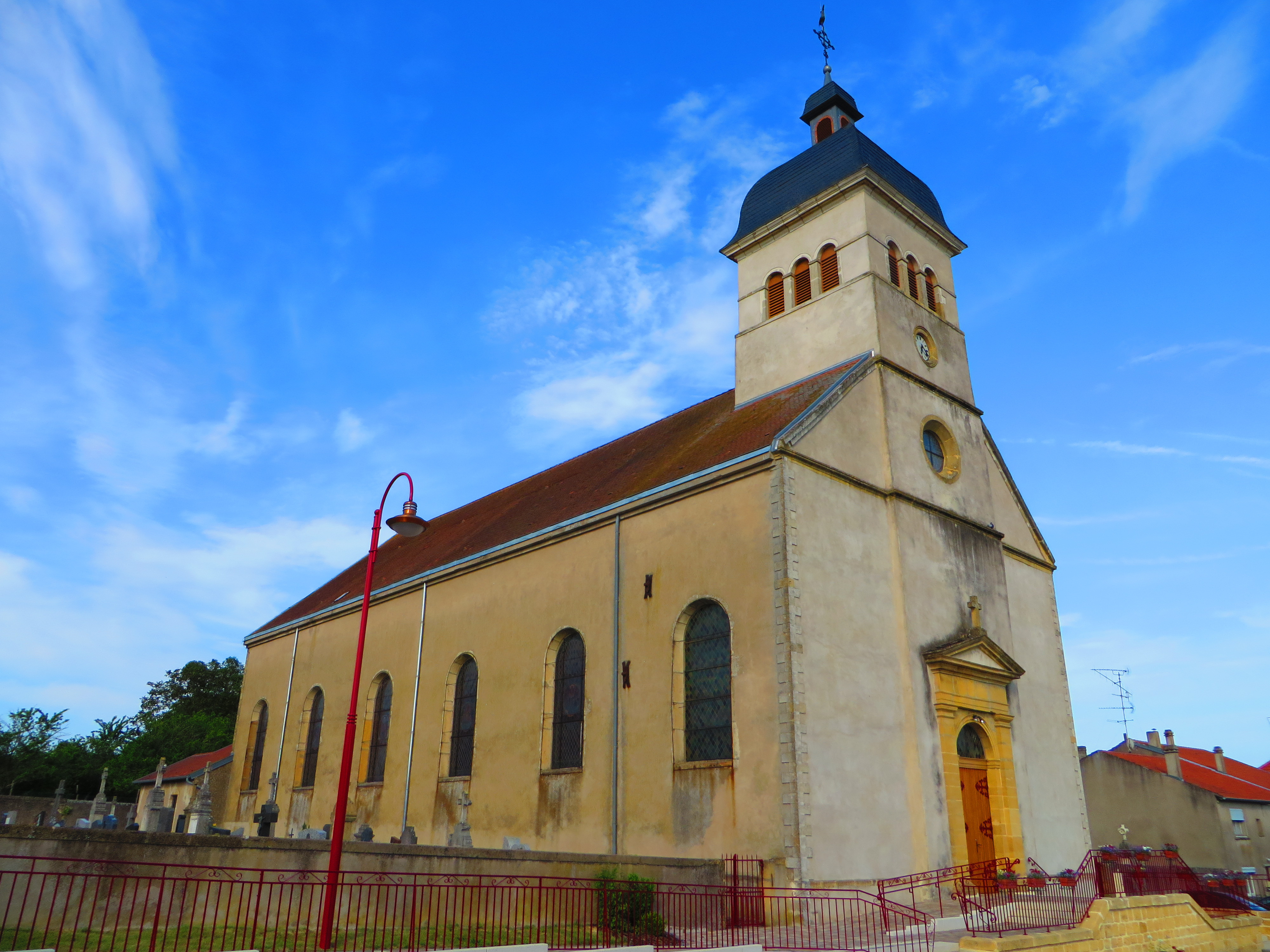
- The church in Herny

- Coat of arms
- Location of Herny
- Location within France Location within Grand Est
- Coordinates: 48°59′59″N 6°28′57″E
- Country: France
- Region: Grand Est
- Department: Moselle
- Arrondissement: Forbach-Boulay-Moselle
- Canton: Faulquemont
- Intercommunality: CC du District Urbain de Faulquemont

Government
  - Mayor (2020–2026): Dominique Lerond
- Area^{1}: 9.64 km^{2} (3.72 sq mi)
- Elevation: 250 m (820 ft)
- Highest elevation: 303 m (994 ft)
- Lowest elevation: 225 m (738 ft)
- Population (2023): 515
  - Density: 53.4/km^{2} (138/sq mi)
- Time zone: UTC+01:00 (CET)
  - Summer (DST): UTC+02:00 (CEST)
- INSEE/Postal code: 57319 /57580
- ^{1} French Land Register data, which excludes lakes, ponds, glaciers > 1 km^{2} (0.386 sq mi or 247 acres) and river estuaries.

Herny (French pronunciation: [ɛʁni]; German: Herlingen) is a commune in the Moselle department in Grand Est in north-eastern France.

== See also ==
- Communes of the Moselle department
