= Fouligny =

- Commune
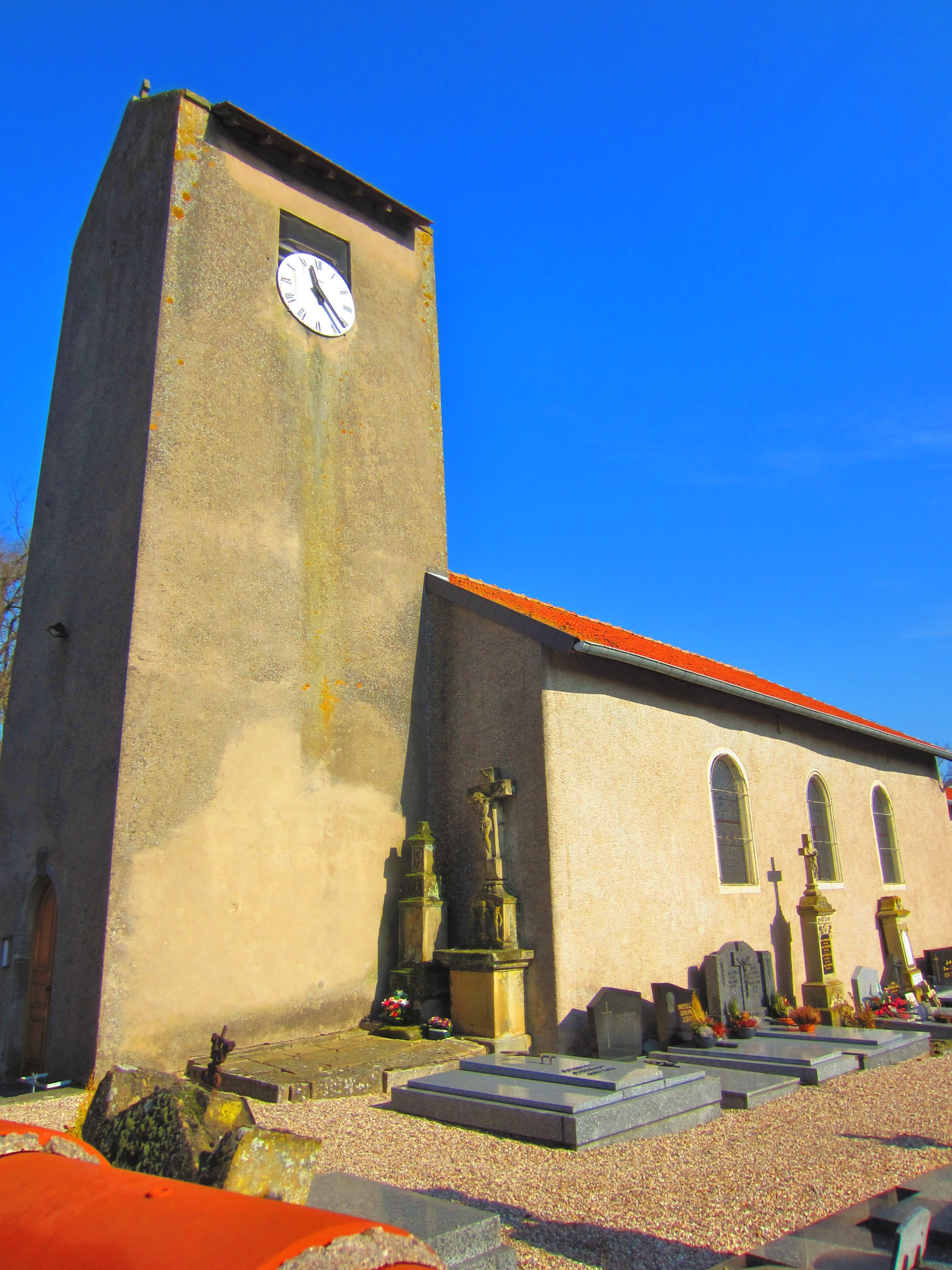
- The church in Fouligny

- Coat of arms
- Location of Fouligny
- Location within France Location within Grand Est
- Coordinates: 49°05′39″N 6°30′19″E
- Country: France
- Region: Grand Est
- Department: Moselle
- Arrondissement: Forbach-Boulay-Moselle
- Canton: Faulquemont
- Intercommunality: CC du District Urbain de Faulquemont

Government
  - Mayor (2020–2026): Antoine Bour
- Area^{1}: 5.96 km^{2} (2.30 sq mi)
- Elevation: 222 m (728 ft)
- Highest elevation: 315 m (1,033 ft)
- Lowest elevation: 219 m (719 ft)
- Population (2023): 192
  - Density: 32.2/km^{2} (83.4/sq mi)
- Time zone: UTC+01:00 (CET)
  - Summer (DST): UTC+02:00 (CEST)
- INSEE/Postal code: 57230 /57220
- ^{1} French Land Register data, which excludes lakes, ponds, glaciers > 1 km^{2} (0.386 sq mi or 247 acres) and river estuaries.

Fouligny (French pronunciation: [fuliɲi]; German: Füllingen; Lorraine Franconian Fillingen) is a commune in the Moselle department in Grand Est in north-eastern France.

== See also ==
- Communes of the Moselle department
