= Canton of Faulquemont =

Coordinates: 49.0408°N 6.5443°E

Faulquemont
- Canton
- Interactive map of Faulquemont
- Country: France
- Region: Grand Est
- Department: Moselle
- No. of communes: {{{nbcomm}}}
- Area: 474.24 km^{2} (183.11 sq mi)
- Population (2023): 39,774
  - Density: 83.869/km^{2} (217.22/sq mi)
- INSEE code: 57 07

The Canton of Faulquemont is a French administrative division, located in the Moselle département (Grand Est région).

== Composition ==
Since the French canton reorganisation which came into effect in March 2015, the communes of the canton of Faulquemont are:

- Adaincourt
- Adelange
- Ancerville
- Arraincourt
- Arriance
- Aube
- Bambiderstroff
- Béchy
- Beux
- Boucheporn
- Buchy
- Chanville
- Cheminot
- Chérisey
- Créhange
- Elvange
- Faulquemont
- Flétrange
- Fleury
- Flocourt
- Fouligny
- Goin
- Guinglange
- Hallering
- Han-sur-Nied
- Haute-Vigneulles
- Hémilly
- Herny
- Holacourt
- Laudrefang
- Lemud
- Liéhon
- Longeville-lès-Saint-Avold
- Louvigny
- Luppy
- Mainvillers
- Many
- Marange-Zondrange
- Orny
- Pagny-lès-Goin
- Pommérieux
- Pontoy
- Pontpierre
- Pournoy-la-Grasse
- Rémilly
- Sillegny
- Silly-en-Saulnois
- Solgne
- Teting-sur-Nied
- Thicourt
- Thimonville
- Thonville
- Tragny
- Tritteling-Redlach
- Vahl-lès-Faulquemont
- Vatimont
- Verny
- Villers-Stoncourt
- Vittoncourt
- Voimhaut
- Zimming

== See also ==
- Cantons of the Moselle department
- Communes of the Moselle department
