= Aube, Moselle =

Aube
- Commune
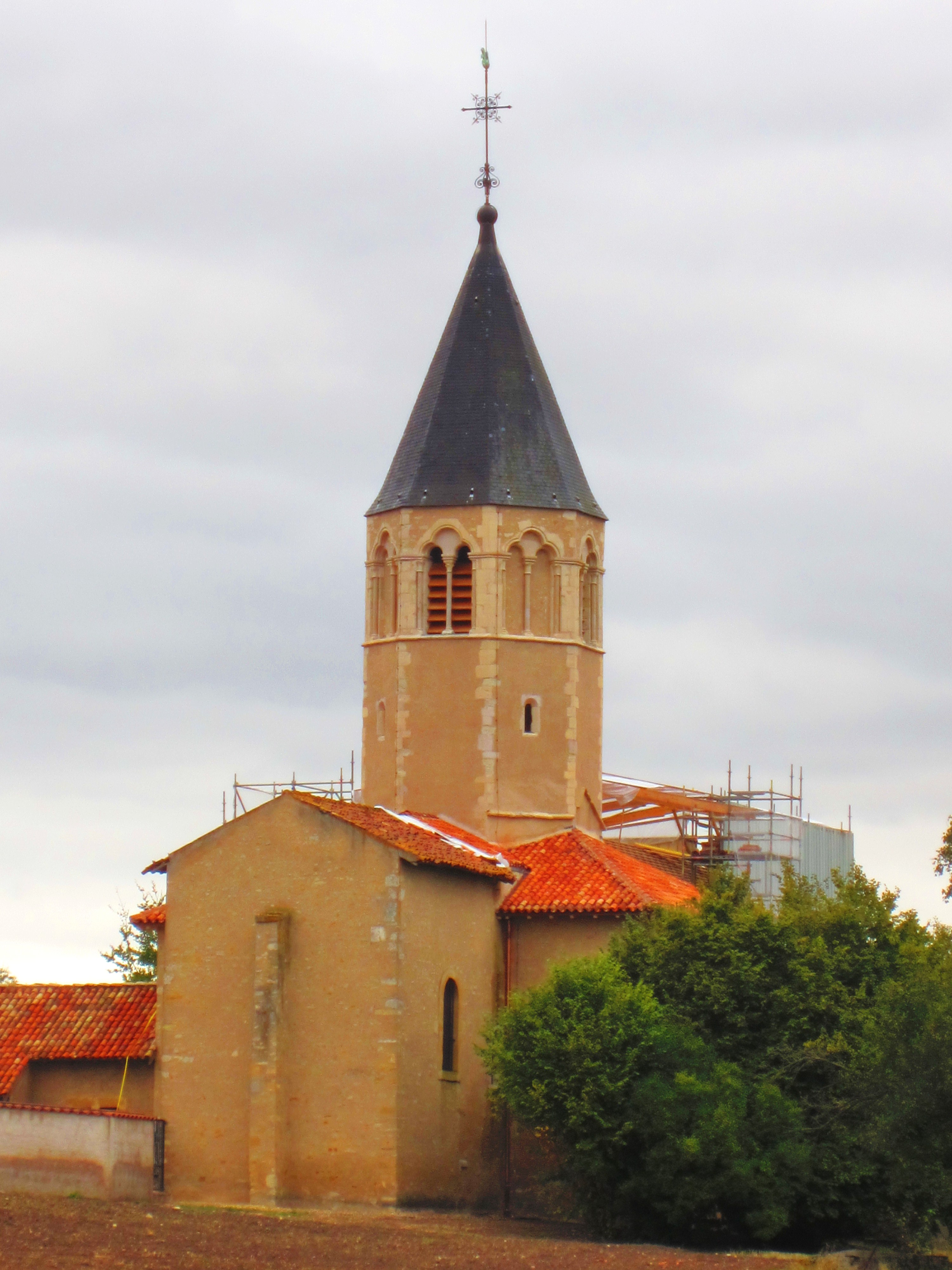
- The church in Aube

- Coat of arms
- Location of Aube
- Location within France Location within Grand Est
- Coordinates: 49°01′39″N 6°20′22″E
- Country: France
- Region: Grand Est
- Department: Moselle
- Arrondissement: Metz
- Canton: Faulquemont
- Intercommunality: CC Sud Messin

Government
  - Mayor (2020–2026): Jean-Christophe Moulon
- Area^{1}: 5.31 km^{2} (2.05 sq mi)
- Elevation: 240 m (790 ft)
- Highest elevation: 282 m (925 ft)
- Lowest elevation: 219 m (719 ft)
- Population (2023): 268
  - Density: 50.5/km^{2} (131/sq mi)
- Time zone: UTC+01:00 (CET)
  - Summer (DST): UTC+02:00 (CEST)
- INSEE/Postal code: 57037 /57580
- ^{1} French Land Register data, which excludes lakes, ponds, glaciers > 1 km^{2} (0.386 sq mi or 247 acres) and river estuaries.

Aube (French pronunciation: [ob]; German: Alben) is a commune in the Moselle department in Grand Est in northeastern France.

== Population ==
Historical population
Year	Pop.	±% p.a.
1968	193	—
1975	180	−0.99%
1982	182	+0.16%
1990	211	+1.87%
1999	203	−0.43%
2007	249	+2.59%
2012	261	+0.95%
2017	268	+0.53%
2023	268	+0.00%
Source: INSEE

== See also ==
- Communes of the Moselle department
