= Thicourt =

- Commune
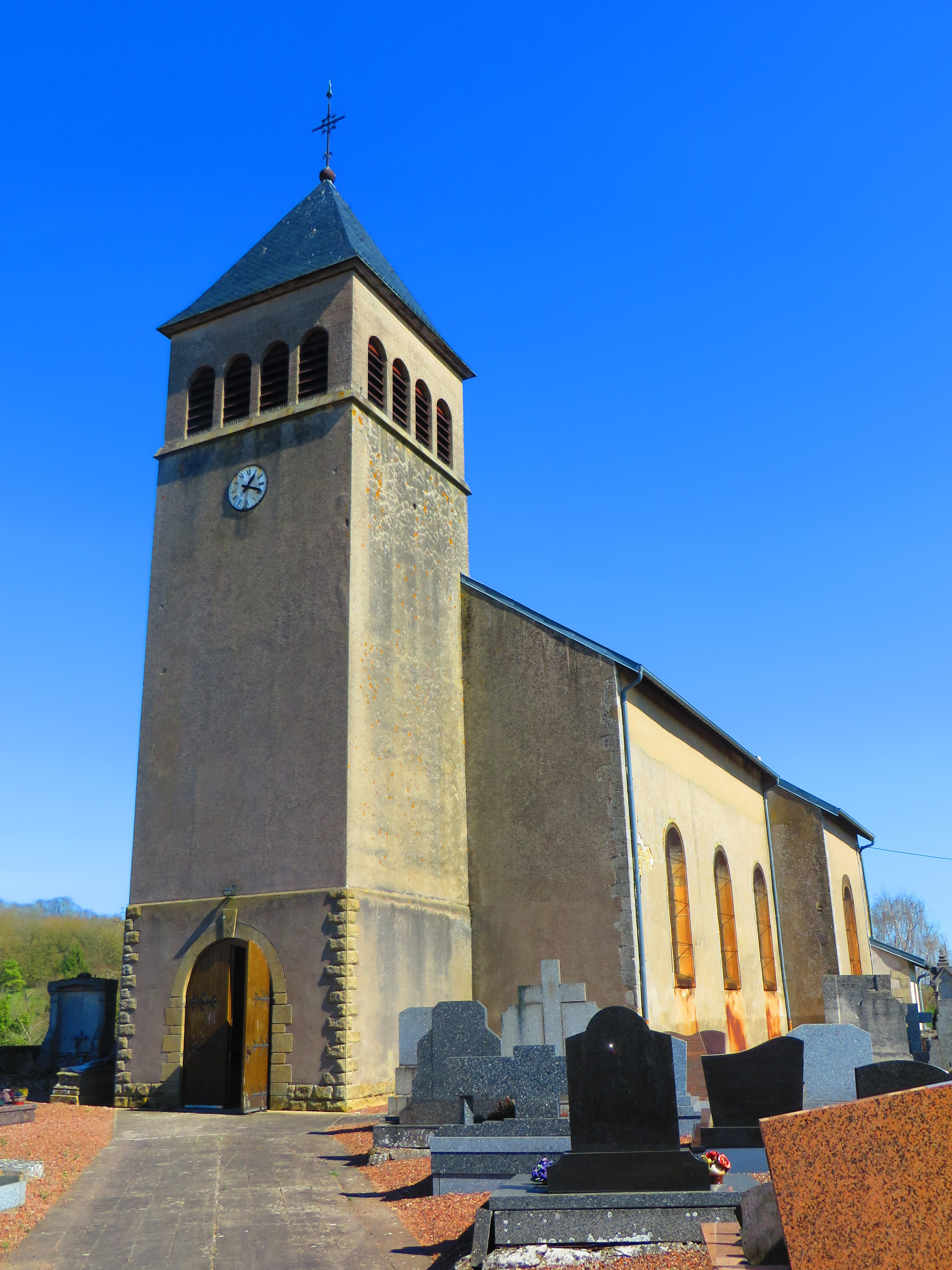
- The church in Thicourt

- Coat of arms
- Location of Thicourt
- Location within France Location within Grand Est
- Coordinates: 48°59′23″N 6°33′24″E
- Country: France
- Region: Grand Est
- Department: Moselle
- Arrondissement: Forbach-Boulay-Moselle
- Canton: Faulquemont
- Intercommunality: District urbain de Faulquemont

Government
  - Mayor (2020–2026): Myriam Reslinger
- Area^{1}: 5.5 km^{2} (2.1 sq mi)
- Elevation: 337 m (1,106 ft)
- Highest elevation: 336 m (1,102 ft)
- Lowest elevation: 234 m (768 ft)
- Population (2023): 132
  - Density: 24/km^{2} (62/sq mi)
- Time zone: UTC+01:00 (CET)
  - Summer (DST): UTC+02:00 (CEST)
- INSEE/Postal code: 57670 /57380
- ^{1} French Land Register data, which excludes lakes, ponds, glaciers > 1 km^{2} (0.386 sq mi or 247 acres) and river estuaries.

Thicourt (French pronunciation: [tikuʁ]; German: Diedersdorf) is a commune in the Moselle department in Grand Est in north-eastern France. In 2019, the municipality had 135 inhabitants, decreasing by 6.9% compared to 2013.

== See also ==
- Communes of the Moselle department
