= Tragny =

- Commune
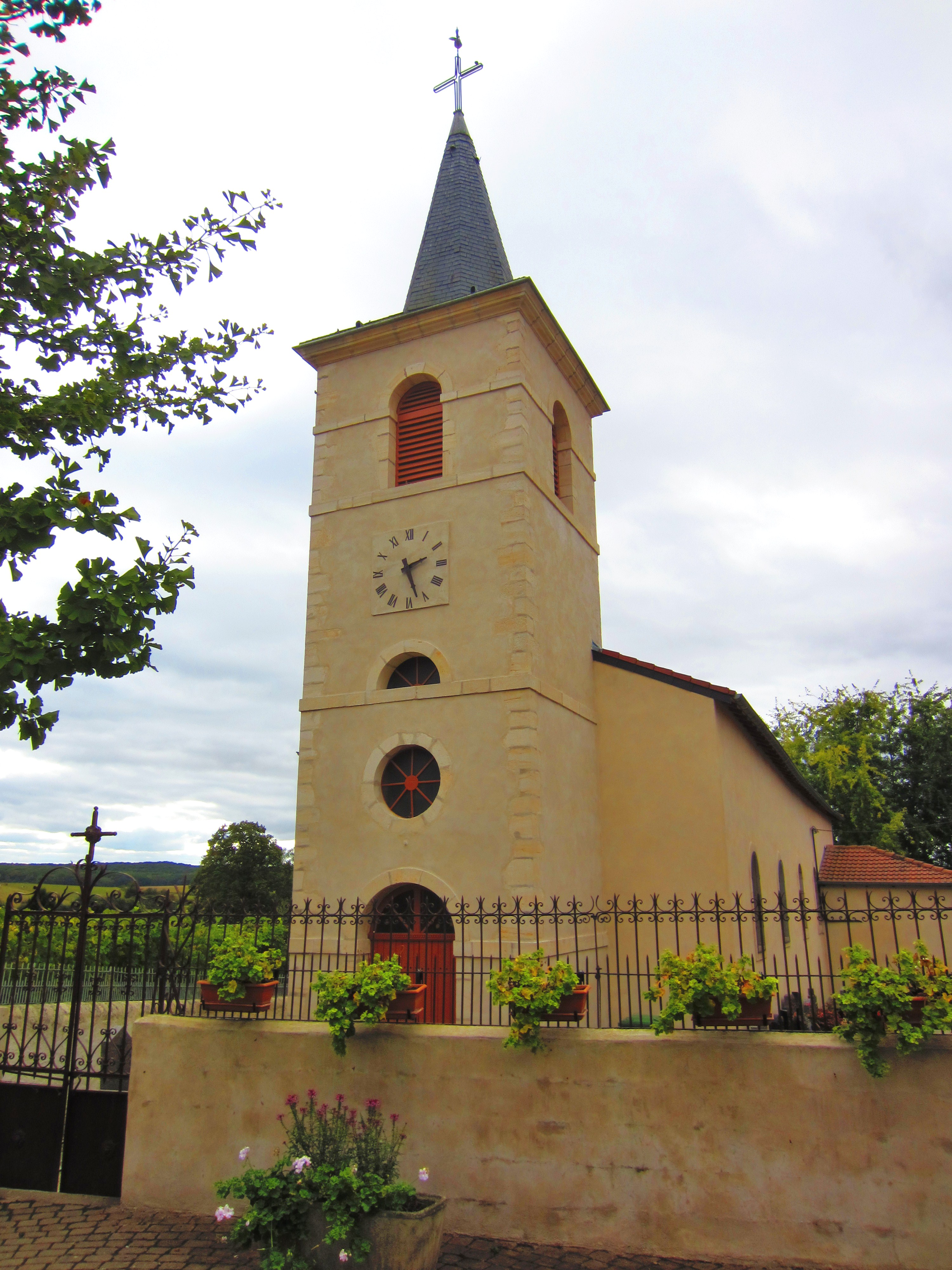
- The church in Tragny

- Coat of arms
- Location of Tragny
- Location within France Location within Grand Est
- Coordinates: 48°57′36″N 6°22′45″E
- Country: France
- Region: Grand Est
- Department: Moselle
- Arrondissement: Metz
- Canton: Faulquemont
- Intercommunality: CC Sud Messin

Government
  - Mayor (2020–2026): Patrice Gérardin
- Area^{1}: 5.43 km^{2} (2.10 sq mi)
- Elevation: 258 m (846 ft)
- Highest elevation: 284 m (932 ft)
- Lowest elevation: 230 m (750 ft)
- Population (2023): 87
  - Density: 16/km^{2} (41/sq mi)
- Time zone: UTC+01:00 (CET)
  - Summer (DST): UTC+02:00 (CEST)
- INSEE/Postal code: 57676 /57580
- ^{1} French Land Register data, which excludes lakes, ponds, glaciers > 1 km^{2} (0.386 sq mi or 247 acres) and river estuaries.

Tragny (French pronunciation: [tʁaɲi]; German: Tranach) is a commune in the Moselle department in Grand Est in north-eastern France.

== See also ==
- Communes of the Moselle department
