= Arriance =

- Commune
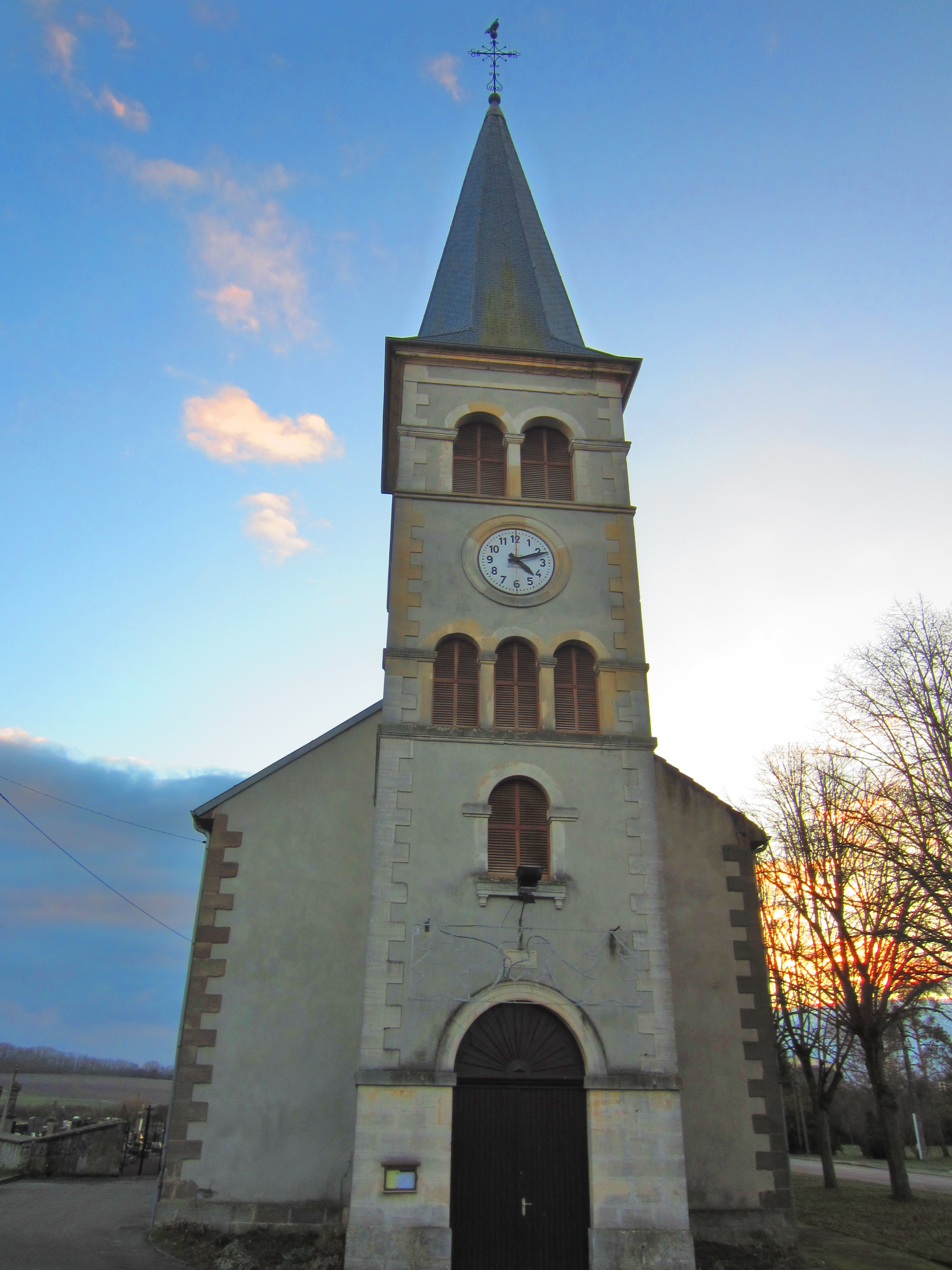
- The church in Arriance

- Coat of arms
- Location of Arriance
- Location within France Location within Grand Est
- Coordinates: 49°01′05″N 6°29′50″E
- Country: France
- Region: Grand Est
- Department: Moselle
- Arrondissement: Forbach-Boulay-Moselle
- Canton: Faulquemont
- Intercommunality: CC District Urbain Faulquemont

Government
  - Mayor (2020–2026): Jean-Marc Jacob
- Area^{1}: 6.98 km^{2} (2.69 sq mi)
- Elevation: 230 m (750 ft)
- Highest elevation: 294 m (965 ft)
- Lowest elevation: 233 m (764 ft)
- Population (2023): 213
  - Density: 30.5/km^{2} (79.0/sq mi)
- Time zone: UTC+01:00 (CET)
  - Summer (DST): UTC+02:00 (CEST)
- INSEE/Postal code: 57029 /57580
- ^{1} French Land Register data, which excludes lakes, ponds, glaciers > 1 km^{2} (0.386 sq mi or 247 acres) and river estuaries.

Arriance (French pronunciation: [aʁjɑ̃s]; German: Argenchen) is a commune in the Moselle department in Grand Est in northeastern France.

== Population ==
Historical population
Year	Pop.	±% p.a.
1968	186	—
1975	165	−1.70%
1982	225	+4.53%
1990	213	−0.68%
1999	226	+0.66%
2007	229	+0.16%
2012	221	−0.71%
2017	212	−0.83%
2023	213	+0.08%
Source: INSEE

== See also ==
- Communes of the Moselle department
