= Pontpierre, Moselle =

Pontpierre
- Commune
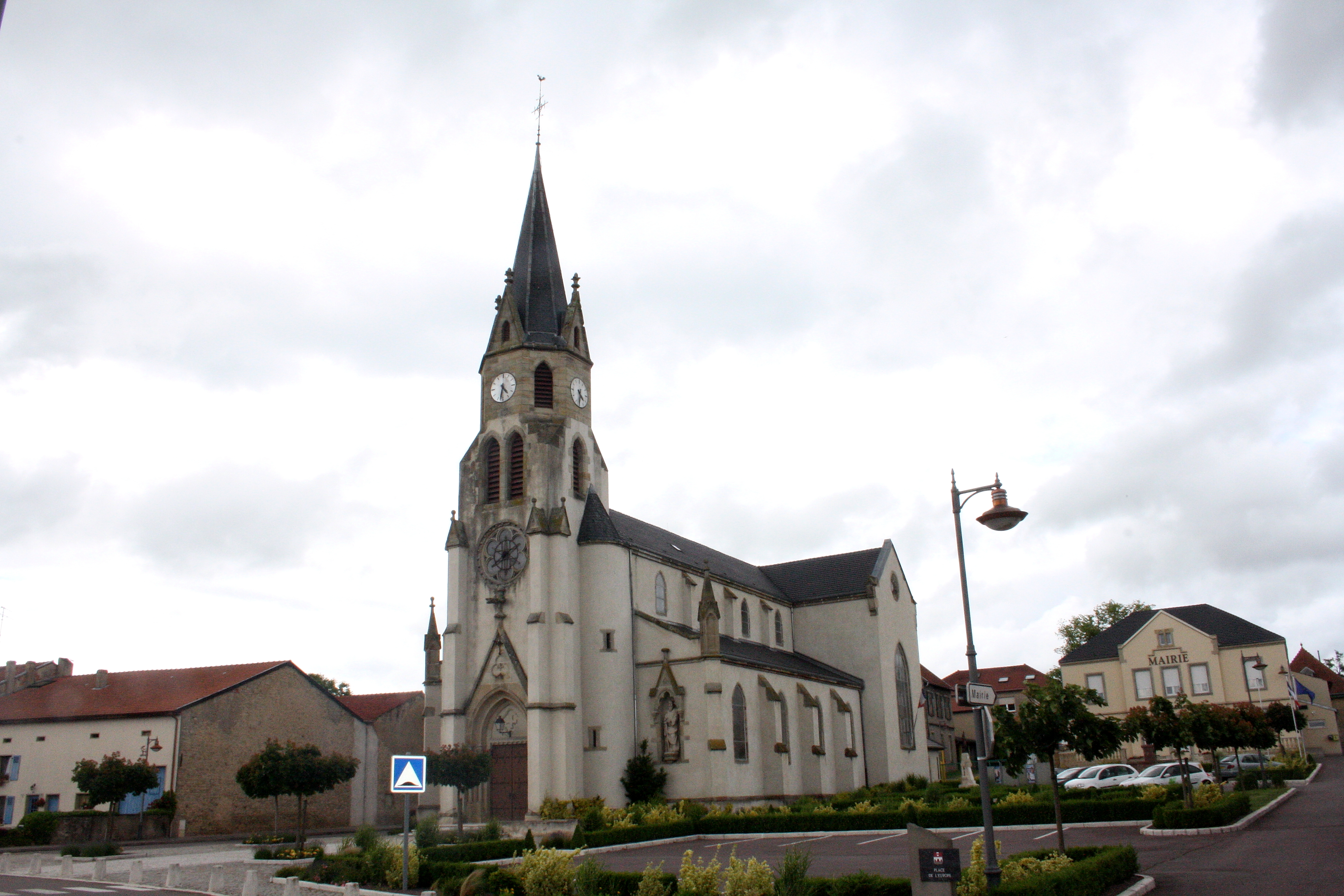
- The church in Pontpierre

- Coat of arms
- Location of Pontpierre
- Location within France Location within Grand Est
- Coordinates: 49°02′33″N 6°38′35″E
- Country: France
- Region: Grand Est
- Department: Moselle
- Arrondissement: Forbach-Boulay-Moselle
- Canton: Faulquemont
- Intercommunality: District Urbain de Faulquemont

Government
  - Mayor (2020–2026): Christian Hauser
- Area^{1}: 8.48 km^{2} (3.27 sq mi)
- Highest elevation: 345 m (1,132 ft)
- Lowest elevation: 243 m (797 ft)
- Population (2023): 735
  - Density: 86.7/km^{2} (224/sq mi)
- Time zone: UTC+01:00 (CET)
  - Summer (DST): UTC+02:00 (CEST)
- INSEE/Postal code: 57549 /57380
- ^{1} French Land Register data, which excludes lakes, ponds, glaciers > 1 km^{2} (0.386 sq mi or 247 acres) and river estuaries.

Pontpierre (French pronunciation: [pɔ̃pjɛʁ]; German: Steinbiedersdorf) is a commune in the Moselle department in Grand Est in north-eastern France.

== See also ==
- Communes of the Moselle department
