= Many, Moselle =

Many
- Commune
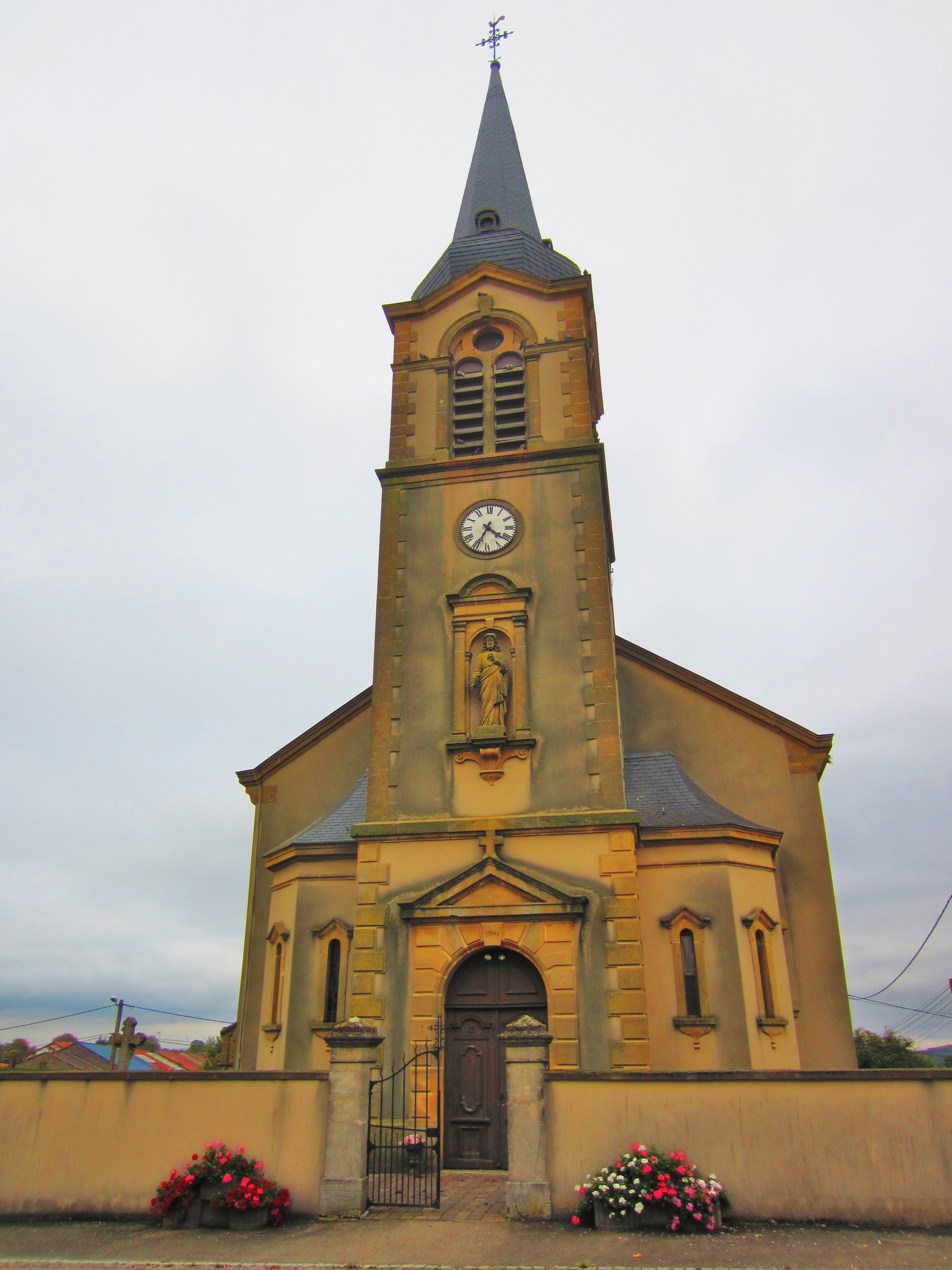
- The church in Many

- Coat of arms
- Location of Many
- Location within France Location within Grand Est
- Coordinates: 49°00′12″N 6°31′21″E
- Country: France
- Region: Grand Est
- Department: Moselle
- Arrondissement: Forbach-Boulay-Moselle
- Canton: Faulquemont
- Intercommunality: CC District urbain de Faulquemont

Government
  - Mayor (2020–2026): Jonathan Szablewski
- Area^{1}: 8.22 km^{2} (3.17 sq mi)
- Elevation: 250 m (820 ft)
- Highest elevation: 328 m (1,076 ft)
- Lowest elevation: 242 m (794 ft)
- Population (2023): 257
  - Density: 31.3/km^{2} (81.0/sq mi)
- Time zone: UTC+01:00 (CET)
  - Summer (DST): UTC+02:00 (CEST)
- INSEE/Postal code: 57442 /57000
- ^{1} French Land Register data, which excludes lakes, ponds, glaciers > 1 km^{2} (0.386 sq mi or 247 acres) and river estuaries.

Many (French pronunciation: [mani]; German: 1180: Manheim, Niederum) is a commune in the Moselle department in Grand Est in north-eastern France.

== See also ==
- Communes of the Moselle department
