= Luppy =

- Commune
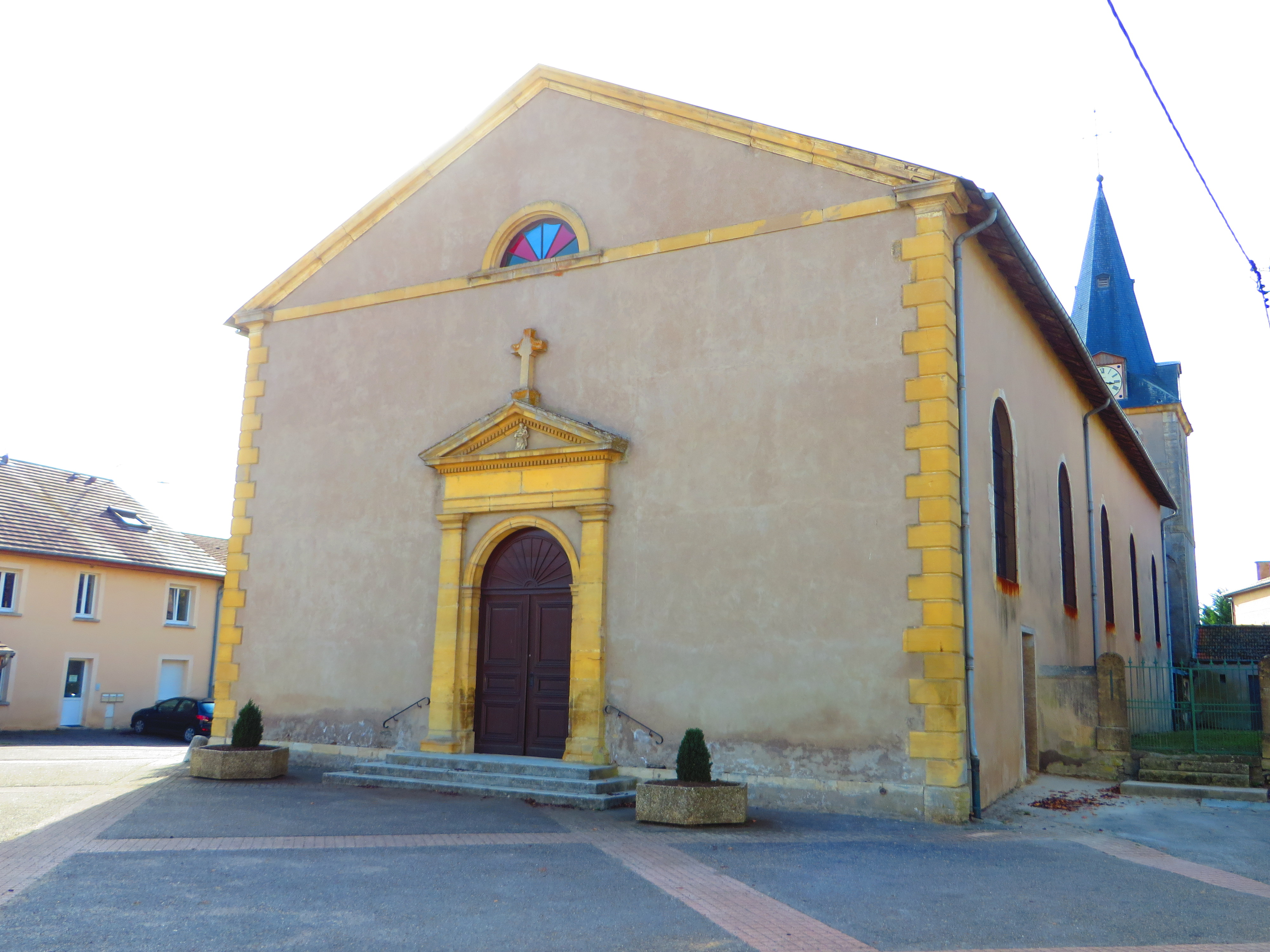
- The church in Luppy

- Coat of arms
- Location of Luppy
- Location within France Location within Grand Est
- Coordinates: 48°58′55″N 6°20′43″E
- Country: France
- Region: Grand Est
- Department: Moselle
- Arrondissement: Metz
- Canton: Faulquemont
- Intercommunality: CC Sud Messin

Government
  - Mayor (2020–2026): Hervé Belloy
- Area^{1}: 16.26 km^{2} (6.28 sq mi)
- Elevation: 260 m (850 ft)
- Highest elevation: 311 m (1,020 ft)
- Lowest elevation: 238 m (781 ft)
- Population (2023): 595
  - Density: 36.6/km^{2} (94.8/sq mi)
- Time zone: UTC+01:00 (CET)
  - Summer (DST): UTC+02:00 (CEST)
- INSEE/Postal code: 57425 /57580
- ^{1} French Land Register data, which excludes lakes, ponds, glaciers > 1 km^{2} (0.386 sq mi or 247 acres) and river estuaries.

Luppy (French pronunciation: [lypi]; German: Luppingen) is a commune in the Moselle department in Grand Est in north-eastern France.

== See also ==
- Communes of the Moselle department
