= Silly-en-Saulnois =

- Commune
- Coat of arms
- Location of Silly-en-Saulnois
- Location within France Location within Grand Est
- Coordinates: 48°59′30″N 6°16′38″E
- Country: France
- Region: Grand Est
- Department: Moselle
- Arrondissement: Metz
- Canton: Faulquemont
- Intercommunality: Sud Messin

Government
  - Mayor (2020–2026): Jean Renaut
- Area^{1}: 2.35 km^{2} (0.91 sq mi)
- Elevation: 200 m (660 ft)
- Highest elevation: 303 m (994 ft)
- Lowest elevation: 250 m (820 ft)
- Population (2023): 35
  - Density: 15/km^{2} (39/sq mi)
- Time zone: UTC+01:00 (CET)
  - Summer (DST): UTC+02:00 (CEST)
- INSEE/Postal code: 57653 /57420
- ^{1} French Land Register data, which excludes lakes, ponds, glaciers > 1 km^{2} (0.386 sq mi or 247 acres) and river estuaries.

Silly-en-Saulnois (German: Sillingen) is a commune in the Moselle department in Grand Est in north-eastern France.

== See also ==
- Communes of the Moselle department
