= Béchy =

- Commune
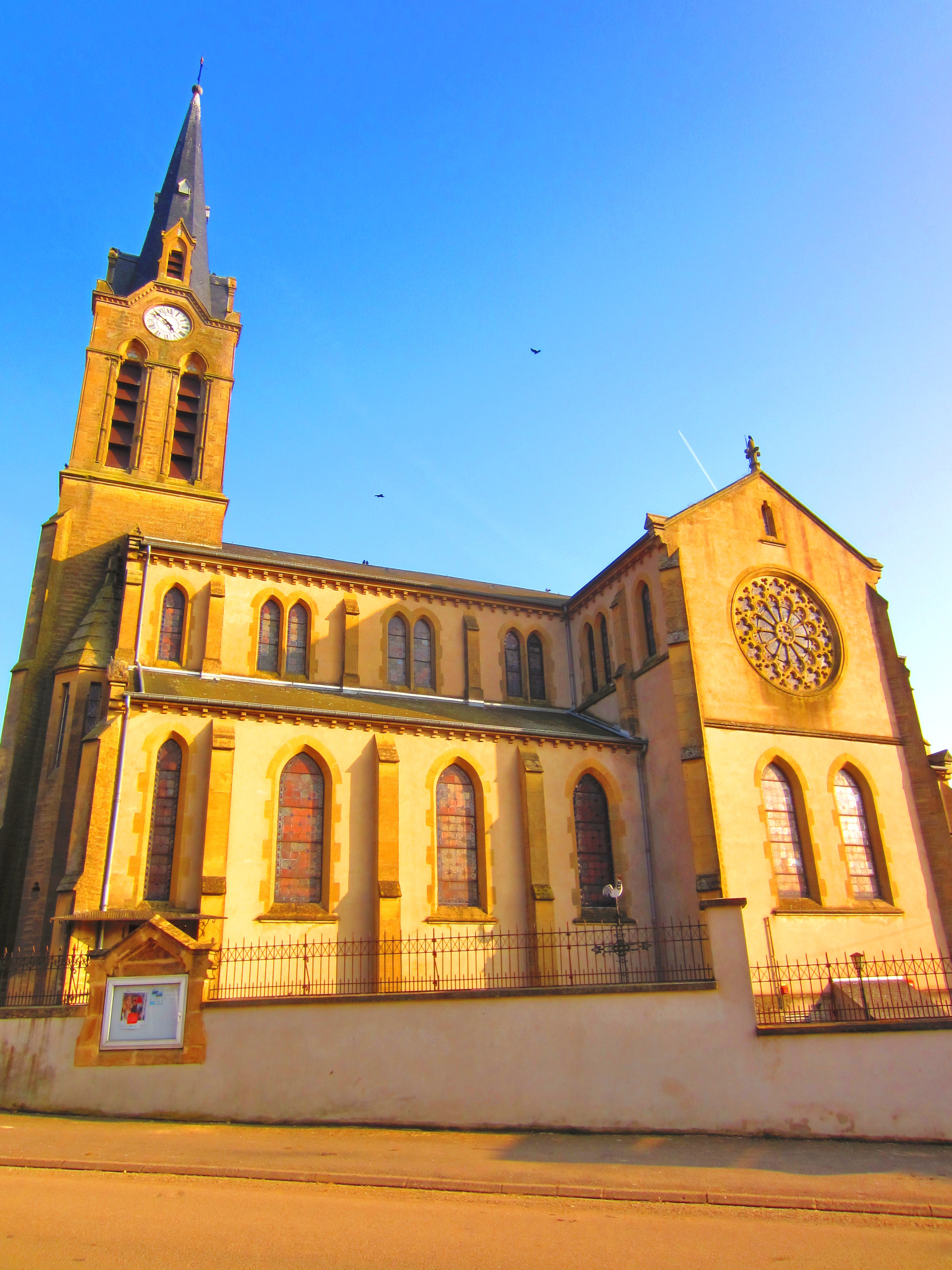
- The church in Béchy

- Coat of arms
- Location of Béchy
- Location within France Location within Grand Est
- Coordinates: 48°59′14″N 6°22′52″E
- Country: France
- Region: Grand Est
- Department: Moselle
- Arrondissement: Metz
- Canton: Faulquemont
- Intercommunality: Sud Messin

Government
  - Mayor (2021–2026): Gilles Drouin
- Area^{1}: 9.57 km^{2} (3.69 sq mi)
- Elevation: 280 m (920 ft)
- Highest elevation: 311 m (1,020 ft)
- Lowest elevation: 234 m (768 ft)
- Population (2023): 615
  - Density: 64.3/km^{2} (166/sq mi)
- Time zone: UTC+01:00 (CET)
  - Summer (DST): UTC+02:00 (CEST)
- INSEE/Postal code: 57057 /57580
- ^{1} French Land Register data, which excludes lakes, ponds, glaciers > 1 km^{2} (0.386 sq mi or 247 acres) and river estuaries.

Béchy (French pronunciation: [beʃi]; German: Bechingen) is a commune in the Moselle department of Grand Est in northeastern France.

== See also ==
- Communes of the Moselle department
