= Tritteling-Redlach =

- Commune
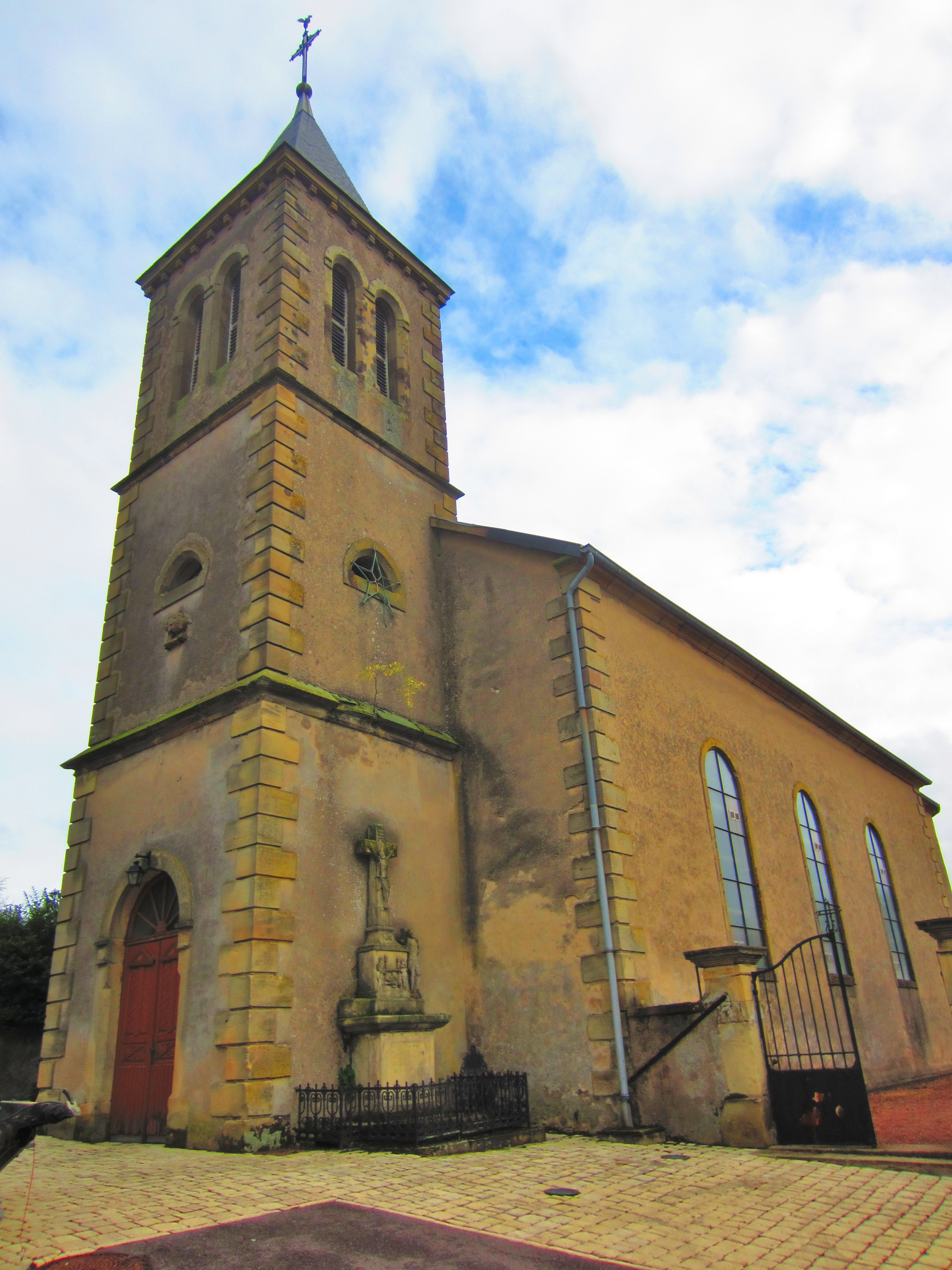
- The church in Tritteling

- Coat of arms
- Location of Tritteling-Redlach
- Location within France Location within Grand Est
- Coordinates: 49°04′46″N 6°37′14″E
- Country: France
- Region: Grand Est
- Department: Moselle
- Arrondissement: Forbach-Boulay-Moselle
- Canton: Faulquemont
- Intercommunality: District Urbain de Faulquemont

Government
  - Mayor (2020–2026): Jean Marini
- Area^{1}: 6 km^{2} (2.3 sq mi)
- Elevation: 380 m (1,250 ft)
- Highest elevation: 406 m (1,332 ft)
- Lowest elevation: 305 m (1,001 ft)
- Population (2023): 509
  - Density: 85/km^{2} (220/sq mi)
- Time zone: UTC+01:00 (CET)
  - Summer (DST): UTC+02:00 (CEST)
- INSEE/Postal code: 57679 /57385
- ^{1} French Land Register data, which excludes lakes, ponds, glaciers > 1 km^{2} (0.386 sq mi or 247 acres) and river estuaries.

Tritteling-Redlach (French pronunciation: [tʁitlɛ̃ ʁɛdlak]; German: Trittelingen-Redlach, before 1999: Tritteling) is a commune in the Moselle department in Grand Est in north-eastern France.

== See also ==
- Communes of the Moselle department
