= Flocourt =

- Commune
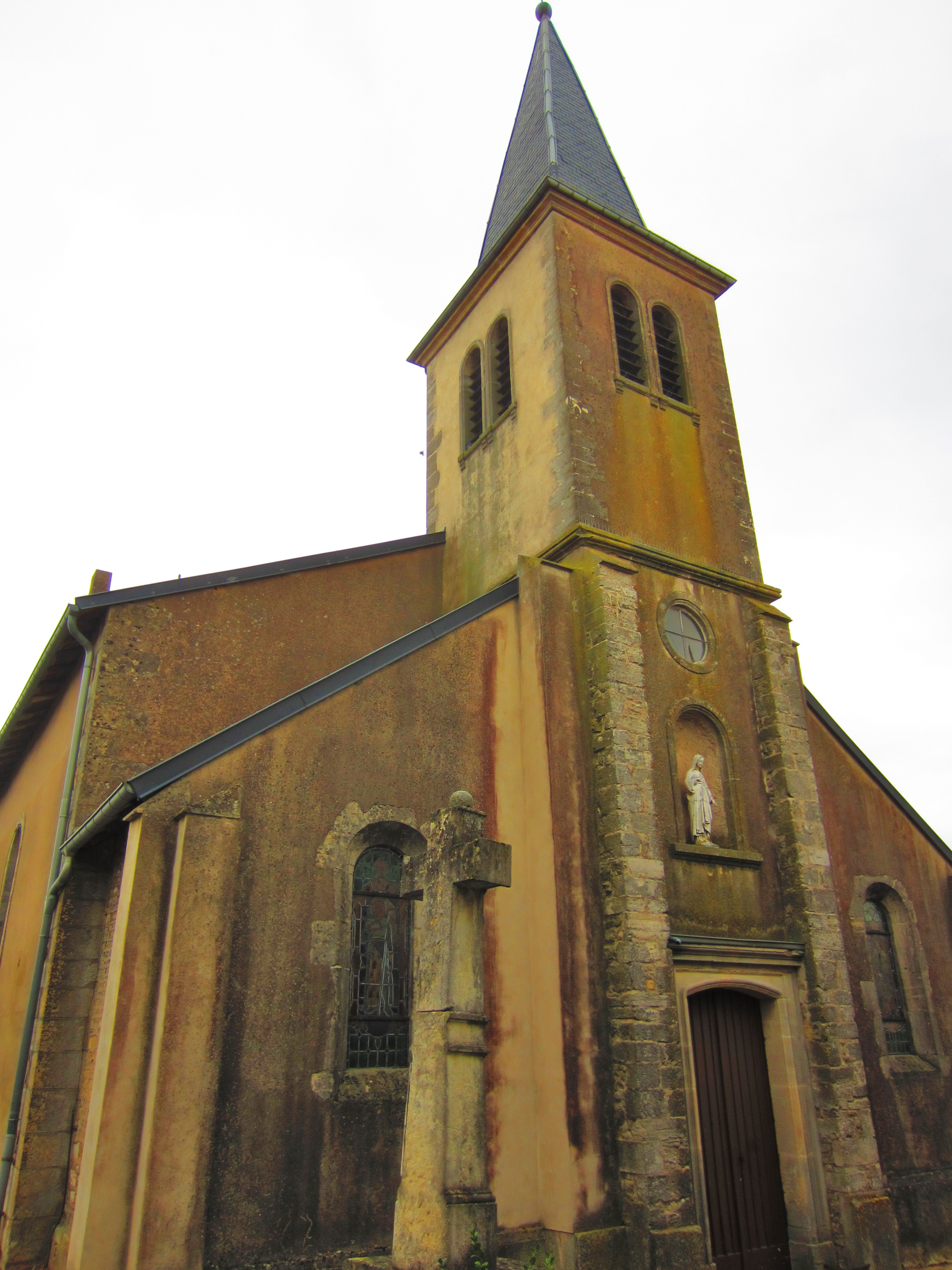
- The church in Flocourt

- Coat of arms
- Location of Flocourt
- Location within France Location within Grand Est
- Coordinates: 48°58′25″N 6°24′43″E
- Country: France
- Region: Grand Est
- Department: Moselle
- Arrondissement: Metz
- Canton: Faulquemont
- Intercommunality: CC Sud Messin

Government
  - Mayor (2020–2026): Bruno Gandar
- Area^{1}: 4.53 km^{2} (1.75 sq mi)
- Elevation: 245 m (804 ft)
- Highest elevation: 273 m (896 ft)
- Lowest elevation: 226 m (741 ft)
- Population (2023): 135
  - Density: 29.8/km^{2} (77.2/sq mi)
- Time zone: UTC+01:00 (CET)
  - Summer (DST): UTC+02:00 (CEST)
- INSEE/Postal code: 57220 /57580
- ^{1} French Land Register data, which excludes lakes, ponds, glaciers > 1 km^{2} (0.386 sq mi or 247 acres) and river estuaries.

Flocourt (French pronunciation: [flɔkuʁ]; German: Flodoaldshofen) is a commune in the Moselle department in Grand Est in north-eastern France.

== See also ==
- Communes of the Moselle department
