= Zimming =

- Commune
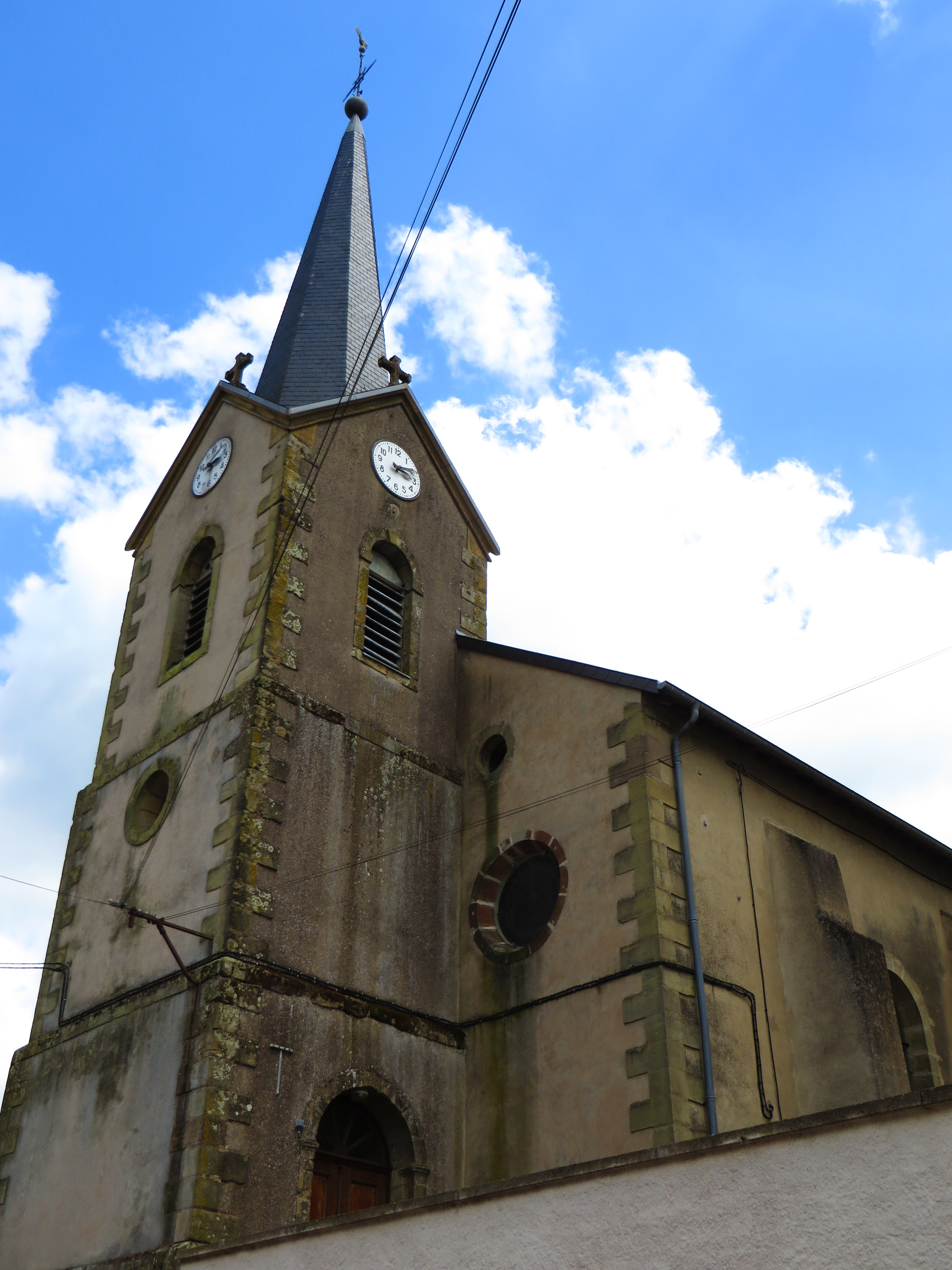
- The church in Zimming

- Coat of arms
- Location of Zimming
- Location within France Location within Grand Est
- Coordinates: 49°07′34″N 6°35′19″E
- Country: France
- Region: Grand Est
- Department: Moselle
- Arrondissement: Forbach-Boulay-Moselle
- Canton: Faulquemont
- Intercommunality: District Urbain de Faulquemont

Government
  - Mayor (2020–2026): Daniel Roth
- Area^{1}: 7.87 km^{2} (3.04 sq mi)
- Elevation: 370 m (1,210 ft)
- Highest elevation: 411 m (1,348 ft)
- Lowest elevation: 285 m (935 ft)
- Population (2023): 710
  - Density: 90/km^{2} (230/sq mi)
- Demonym(s): Zimmingeois, Zimmingeoises
- Time zone: UTC+01:00 (CET)
  - Summer (DST): UTC+02:00 (CEST)
- INSEE/Postal code: 57762 /57690
- ^{1} French Land Register data, which excludes lakes, ponds, glaciers > 1 km^{2} (0.386 sq mi or 247 acres) and river estuaries.

Zimming (German: Zimmingen) is a commune in the Moselle department in Grand Est in north-eastern France.

== Population ==
Historical population

Year	Pop.	±% p.a.
1793	365	—
1821	429	+0.58%
1841	402	−0.32%
1861	358	−0.58%
1880	293	−1.05%
1900	226	−1.29%
1926	205	−0.37%
1946	221	+0.38%
1954	930	+19.68%
1962	407	−9.81%

Year	Pop.	±% p.a.
1968	274	−6.38%
1975	474	+8.14%
1982	596	+3.33%
1990	658	+1.24%
1999	627	−0.53%
2007	628	+0.02%
2012	674	+1.42%
2017	712	+1.10%
2023	710	−0.05%

Source: EHESS (1793-1999) and INSEE

== See also ==
- Communes of the Moselle department
