= Villers-Stoncourt =

- Commune
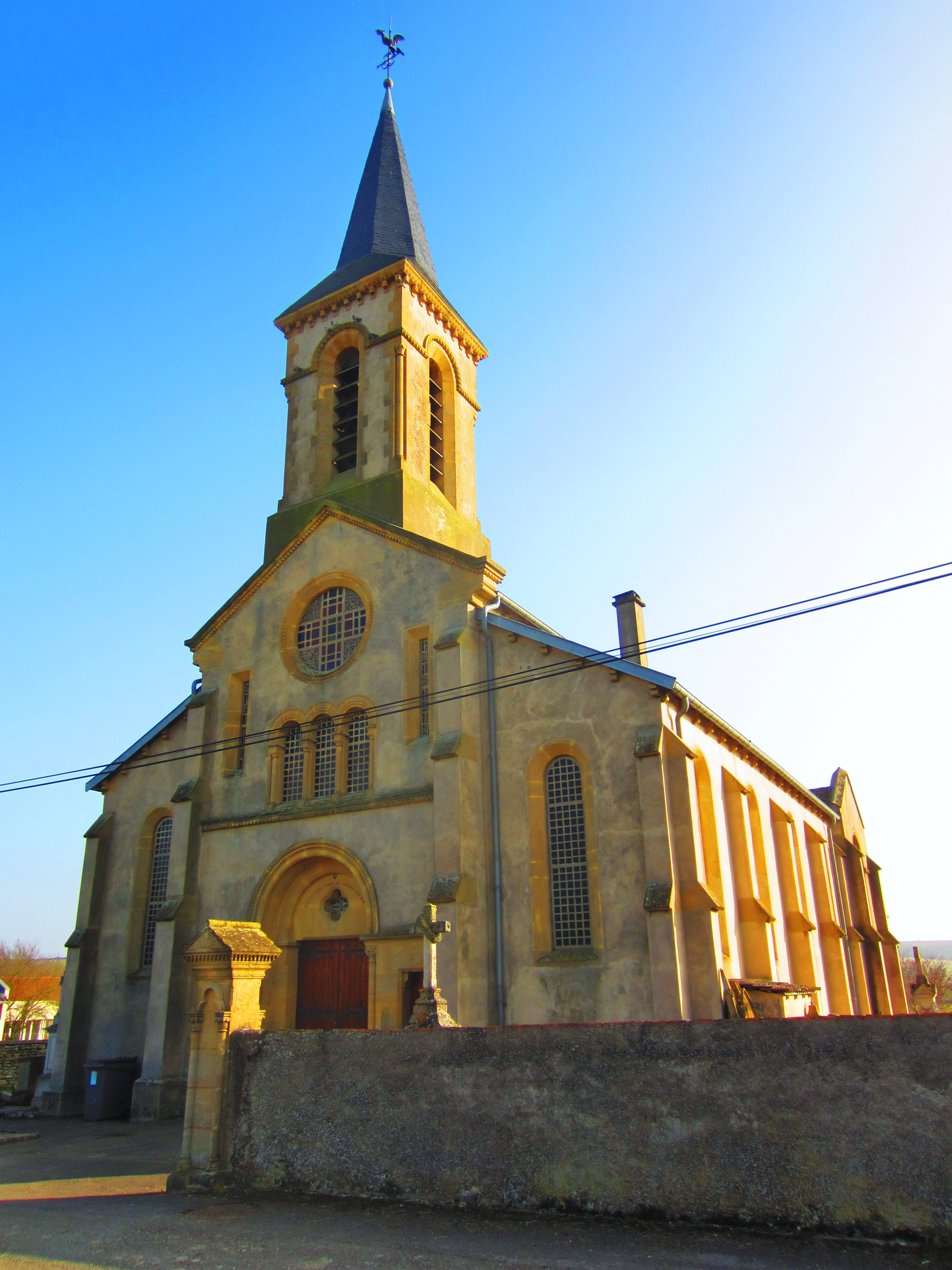
- The church in Villers-Stoncourt

- Coat of arms
- Location of Villers-Stoncourt
- Location within France Location within Grand Est
- Coordinates: 49°03′27″N 6°25′03″E
- Country: France
- Region: Grand Est
- Department: Moselle
- Arrondissement: Metz
- Canton: Faulquemont
- Intercommunality: CC Haut Chemin-Pays de Pange

Government
  - Mayor (2020–2026): Gilbert Jeanront
- Area^{1}: 10.57 km^{2} (4.08 sq mi)
- Elevation: 473 m (1,552 ft)
- Highest elevation: 328 m (1,076 ft)
- Lowest elevation: 224 m (735 ft)
- Population (2023): 225
  - Density: 21.3/km^{2} (55.1/sq mi)
- Time zone: UTC+01:00 (CET)
  - Summer (DST): UTC+02:00 (CEST)
- INSEE/Postal code: 57718 /57530
- ^{1} French Land Register data, which excludes lakes, ponds, glaciers > 1 km^{2} (0.386 sq mi or 247 acres) and river estuaries.

Villers-Stoncourt (French pronunciation: [vilɛʁ stɔ̃kuʁ]; German: Stondorf) is a commune in the Moselle department in Grand Est in north-eastern France.

== See also ==
- Communes of the Moselle department
