= Adelange =

- Commune
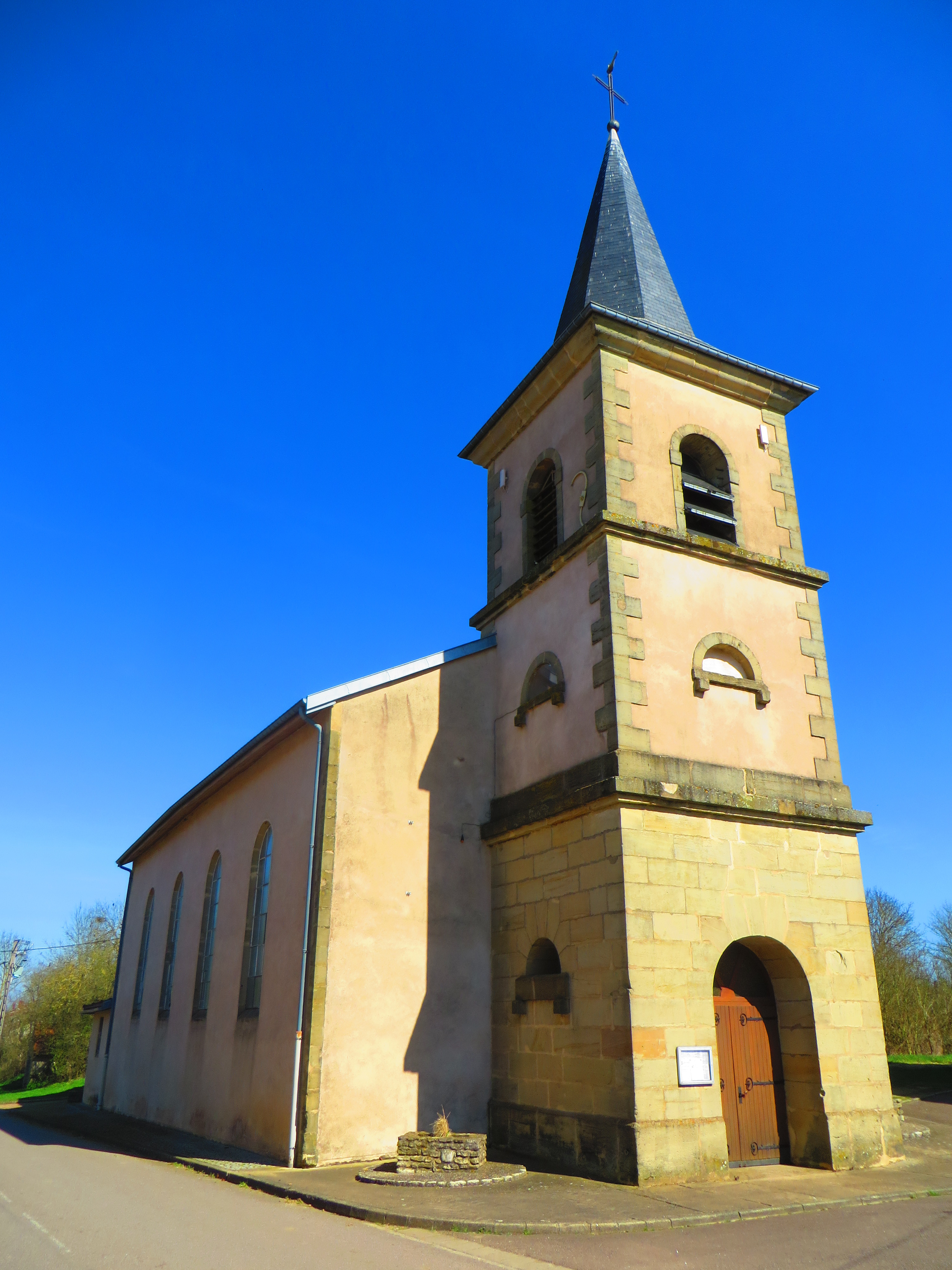
- The church in Adelange

- Coat of arms
- Location of Adelange
- Location within France Location within Grand Est
- Coordinates: 49°00′21″N 6°36′46″E
- Country: France
- Region: Grand Est
- Department: Moselle
- Arrondissement: Forbach-Boulay-Moselle
- Canton: Faulquemont
- Intercommunality: District Urbain de Faulquemont

Government
  - Mayor (2020–2026): Jean-Marc Fuller
- Area^{1}: 5.81 km^{2} (2.24 sq mi)
- Elevation: 250 m (820 ft)
- Highest elevation: 317 m (1,040 ft)
- Lowest elevation: 251 m (823 ft)
- Population (2023): 222
  - Density: 38.2/km^{2} (99.0/sq mi)
- Time zone: UTC+01:00 (CET)
  - Summer (DST): UTC+02:00 (CEST)
- INSEE/Postal code: 57008 /57380
- ^{1} French Land Register data, which excludes lakes, ponds, glaciers > 1 km^{2} (0.386 sq mi or 247 acres) and river estuaries.

Adelange (French pronunciation: [adlɑ̃ʒ]; Lorraine Franconian Aidlingen; German: Edelingen) is a commune in the Moselle department in Grand Est in northeastern France.

== Population ==
Historical population
Year	Pop.	±% p.a.
1968	153	—
1975	171	+1.60%
1982	197	+2.04%
1990	178	−1.26%
1999	208	+1.75%
2007	230	+1.26%
2012	210	−1.80%
2017	209	−0.10%
2023	222	+1.01%
Source: INSEE

== See also ==
- Communes of the Moselle department
