= Lemud =

- Commune
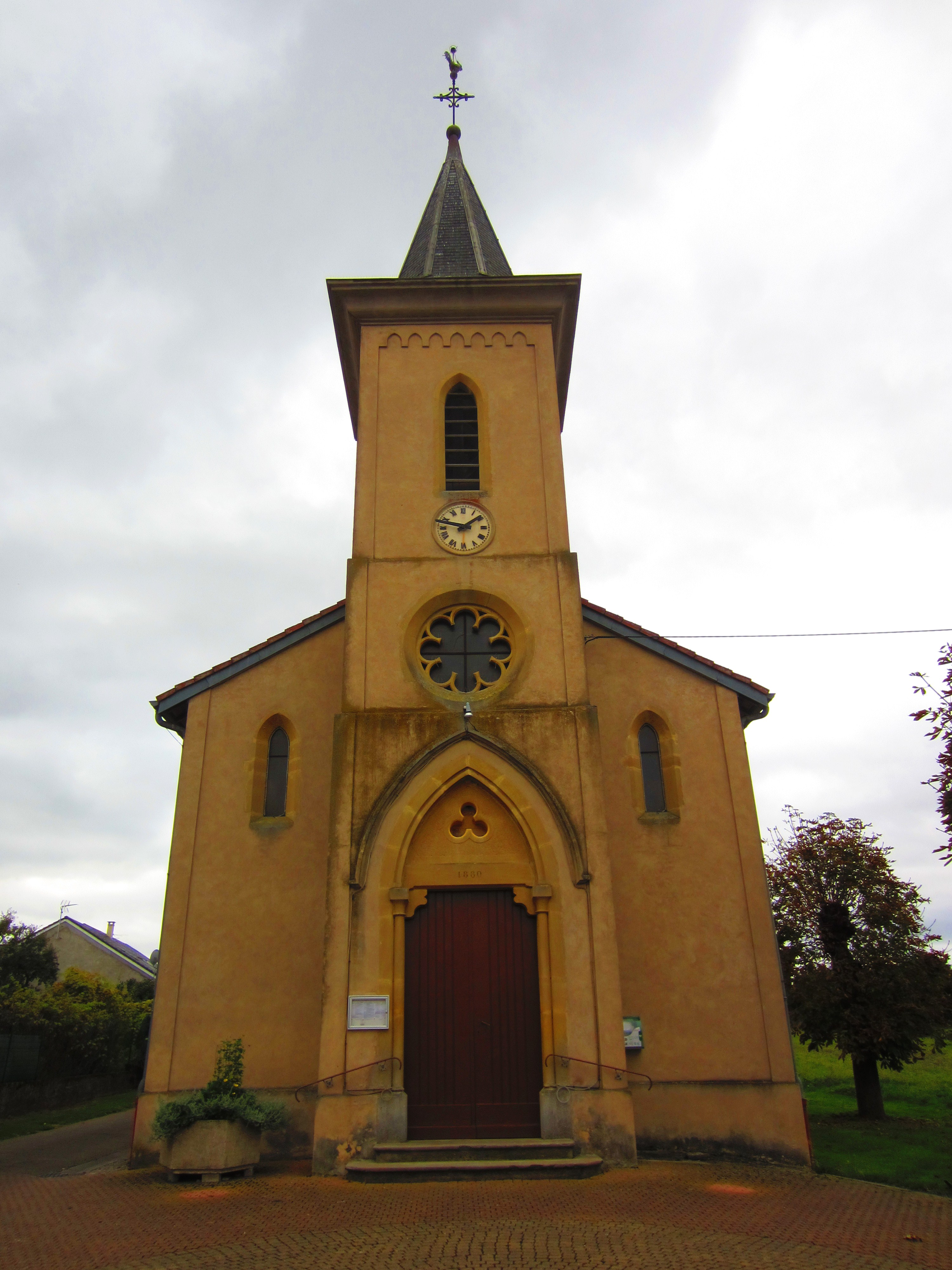
- The church in Lemud

- Coat of arms
- Location of Lemud
- Location within France Location within Grand Est
- Coordinates: 49°02′21″N 6°22′01″E
- Country: France
- Region: Grand Est
- Department: Moselle
- Arrondissement: Metz
- Canton: Faulquemont
- Intercommunality: CC Sud Messin

Government
  - Mayor (2020–2026): Hervé Senser
- Area^{1}: 4.245 km^{2} (1.639 sq mi)
- Highest elevation: 242 m (794 ft)
- Lowest elevation: 216 m (709 ft)
- Population (2023): 516
  - Density: 122/km^{2} (315/sq mi)
- Time zone: UTC+01:00 (CET)
  - Summer (DST): UTC+02:00 (CEST)
- INSEE/Postal code: 57392 /57580
- ^{1} French Land Register data, which excludes lakes, ponds, glaciers > 1 km^{2} (0.386 sq mi or 247 acres) and river estuaries.

Lemud (French pronunciation: [ləmy]; German: Mud) is a commune in the Moselle department in Grand Est in north-eastern France.

== See also ==
- Communes of the Moselle department
