= Chérisey =

- Commune
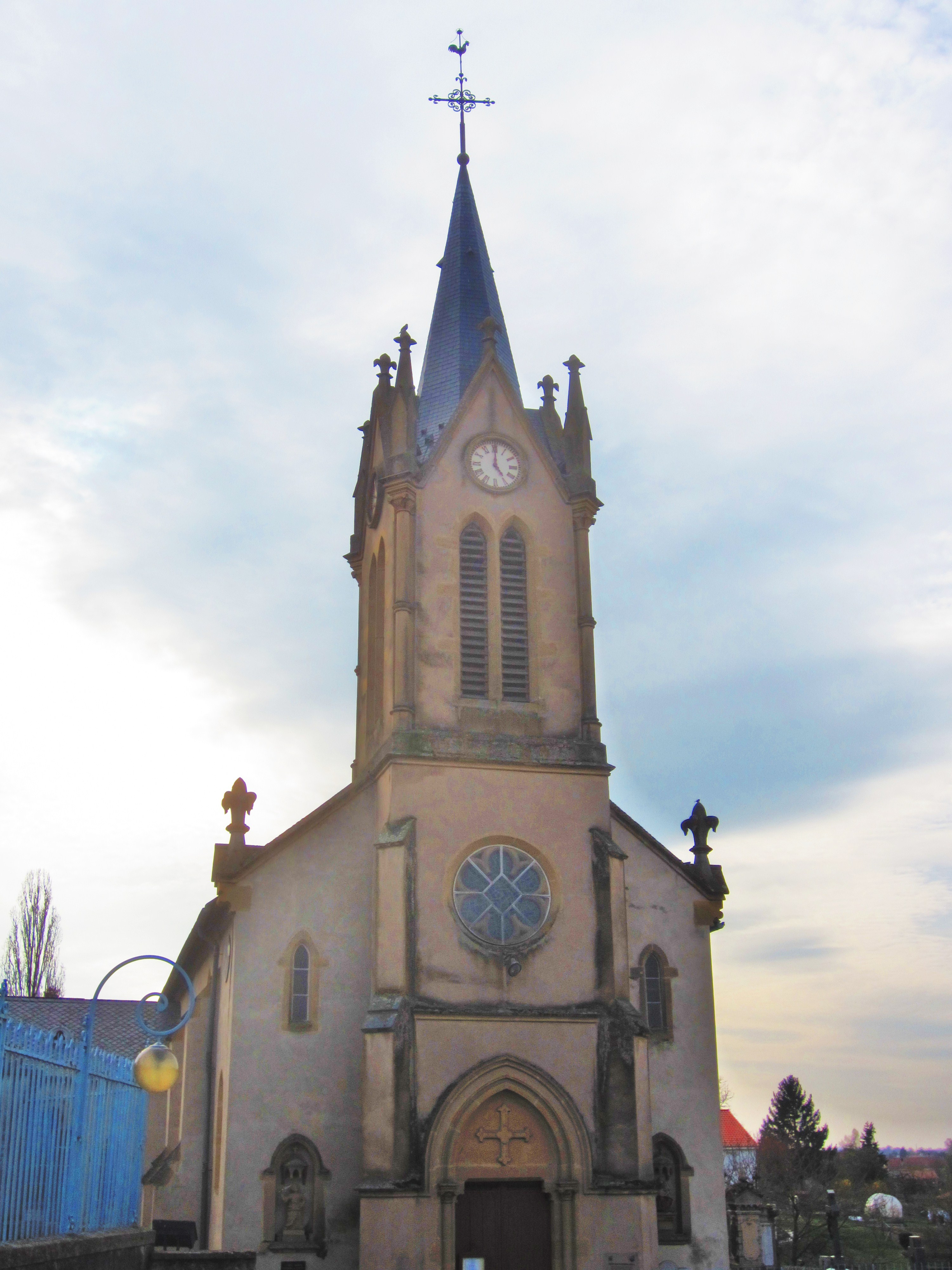
- The church in Chérisey

- Coat of arms
- Location of Chérisey
- Location within France Location within Grand Est
- Coordinates: 49°00′49″N 6°14′06″E
- Country: France
- Region: Grand Est
- Department: Moselle
- Arrondissement: Metz
- Canton: Faulquemont
- Intercommunality: Sud Messin

Government
  - Mayor (2020–2026): Robert Thomas
- Area^{1}: 5.07 km^{2} (1.96 sq mi)
- Elevation: 250 m (820 ft)
- Highest elevation: 258 m (846 ft)
- Lowest elevation: 203 m (666 ft)
- Population (2023): 280
  - Density: 55/km^{2} (140/sq mi)
- Time zone: UTC+01:00 (CET)
  - Summer (DST): UTC+02:00 (CEST)
- INSEE/Postal code: 57139 /57420
- ^{1} French Land Register data, which excludes lakes, ponds, glaciers > 1 km^{2} (0.386 sq mi or 247 acres) and river estuaries.

Chérisey (French pronunciation: [ʃeʁizɛ]; German: Schersingen) is a commune in the Moselle department in Grand Est in north-eastern France.

== See also ==
- Communes of the Moselle department
