= Holacourt =

- Commune
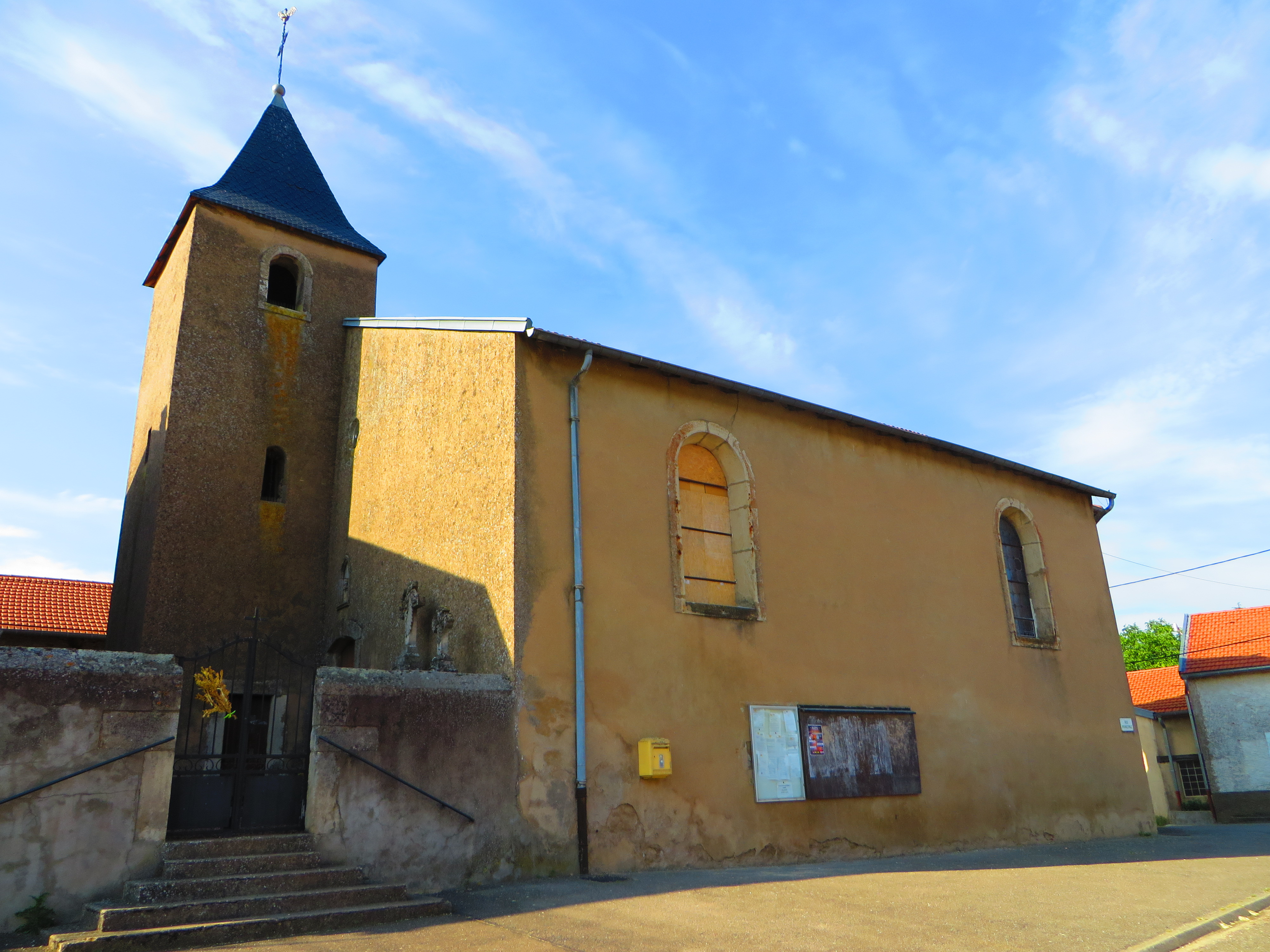
- The church in Holacourt

- Coat of arms
- Location of Holacourt
- Location within France Location within Grand Est
- Coordinates: 48°58′22″N 6°30′50″E
- Country: France
- Region: Grand Est
- Department: Moselle
- Arrondissement: Forbach-Boulay-Moselle
- Canton: Faulquemont
- Intercommunality: CC du District Urbain de Faulquemont

Government
  - Mayor (2020–2026): Jean Bracco
- Area^{1}: 2.92 km^{2} (1.13 sq mi)
- Elevation: 200 m (660 ft)
- Highest elevation: 262 m (860 ft)
- Lowest elevation: 228 m (748 ft)
- Population (2023): 87
  - Density: 30/km^{2} (77/sq mi)
- Time zone: UTC+01:00 (CET)
  - Summer (DST): UTC+02:00 (CEST)
- INSEE/Postal code: 57328 /57380
- ^{1} French Land Register data, which excludes lakes, ponds, glaciers > 1 km^{2} (0.386 sq mi or 247 acres) and river estuaries.

Holacourt (French pronunciation: [ɔlakuʁ]; German: Ollhofen) is a commune in the Moselle department in Grand Est in north-eastern France.

== See also ==
- Communes of the Moselle department
