= Mainvillers =

- Commune
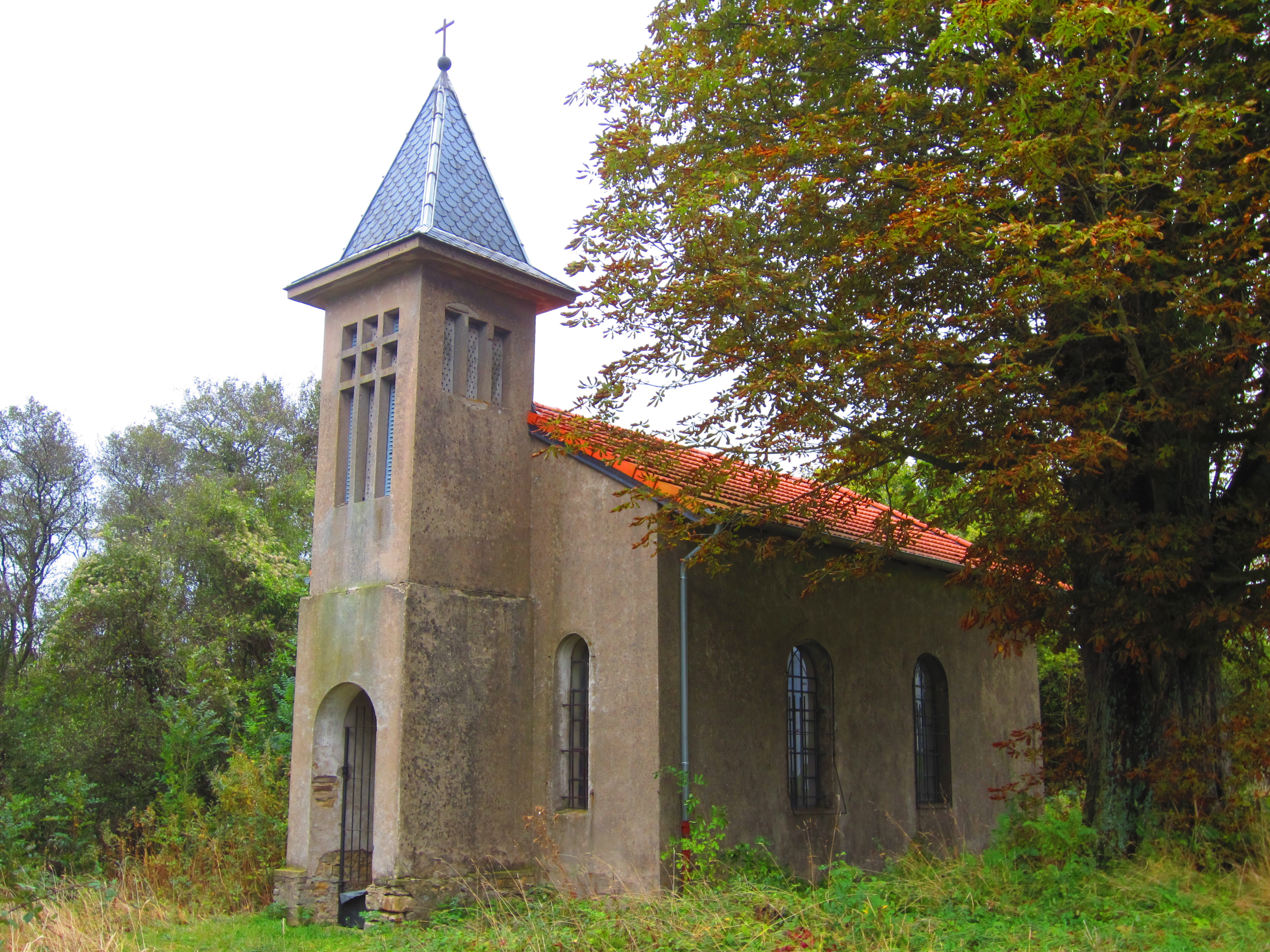
- The chapel in Mainvillers

- Coat of arms
- Location of Mainvillers
- Location within France Location within Grand Est
- Coordinates: 49°01′15″N 6°32′40″E
- Country: France
- Region: Grand Est
- Department: Moselle
- Arrondissement: Forbach-Boulay-Moselle
- Canton: Faulquemont
- Intercommunality: District Urbain de Faulquemont

Government
  - Mayor (2020–2026): Raymond Hauser
- Area^{1}: 6.7 km^{2} (2.6 sq mi)
- Elevation: 225 m (738 ft)
- Highest elevation: 296 m (971 ft)
- Lowest elevation: 248 m (814 ft)
- Population (2023): 318
  - Density: 47/km^{2} (120/sq mi)
- Time zone: UTC+01:00 (CET)
  - Summer (DST): UTC+02:00 (CEST)
- INSEE/Postal code: 57430 /57380
- ^{1} French Land Register data, which excludes lakes, ponds, glaciers > 1 km^{2} (0.386 sq mi or 247 acres) and river estuaries.

Mainvillers (German: Maiweiler; Lorraine Franconian Maiwilla) is a commune in the Moselle department in Grand Est in north-eastern France.

== See also ==
- Communes of the Moselle department
