= Hallering =

- Commune
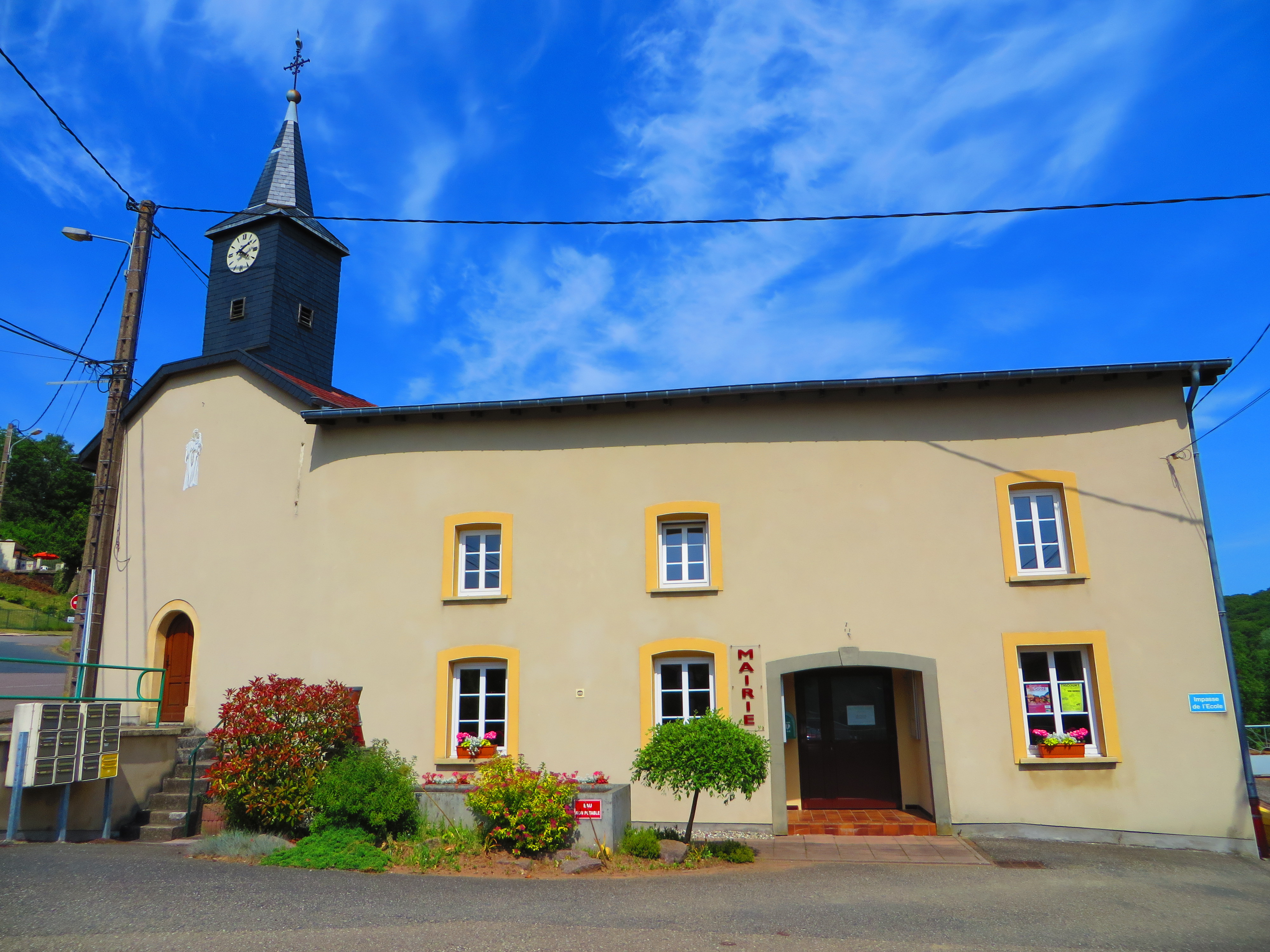
- The town hall and church in Hallering

- Coat of arms
- Location of Hallering
- Location within France Location within Grand Est
- Coordinates: 49°07′13″N 6°33′10″E
- Country: France
- Region: Grand Est
- Department: Moselle
- Arrondissement: Forbach-Boulay-Moselle
- Canton: Faulquemont
- Intercommunality: District urbain de Faulquemont

Government
  - Mayor (2020–2026): Luc Ballasse
- Area^{1}: 3.55 km^{2} (1.37 sq mi)
- Elevation: 400 m (1,300 ft)
- Highest elevation: 378 m (1,240 ft)
- Lowest elevation: 260 m (850 ft)
- Population (2023): 99
  - Density: 28/km^{2} (72/sq mi)
- Time zone: UTC+01:00 (CET)
  - Summer (DST): UTC+02:00 (CEST)
- INSEE/Postal code: 57284 /57690
- ^{1} French Land Register data, which excludes lakes, ponds, glaciers > 1 km^{2} (0.386 sq mi or 247 acres) and river estuaries.

Hallering (French pronunciation: [alʁɛ̃]; German: Halleringen) is a commune in the Moselle department in Grand Est in north-eastern France.

== See also ==
- Communes of the Moselle department
