= Thonville =

- Commune
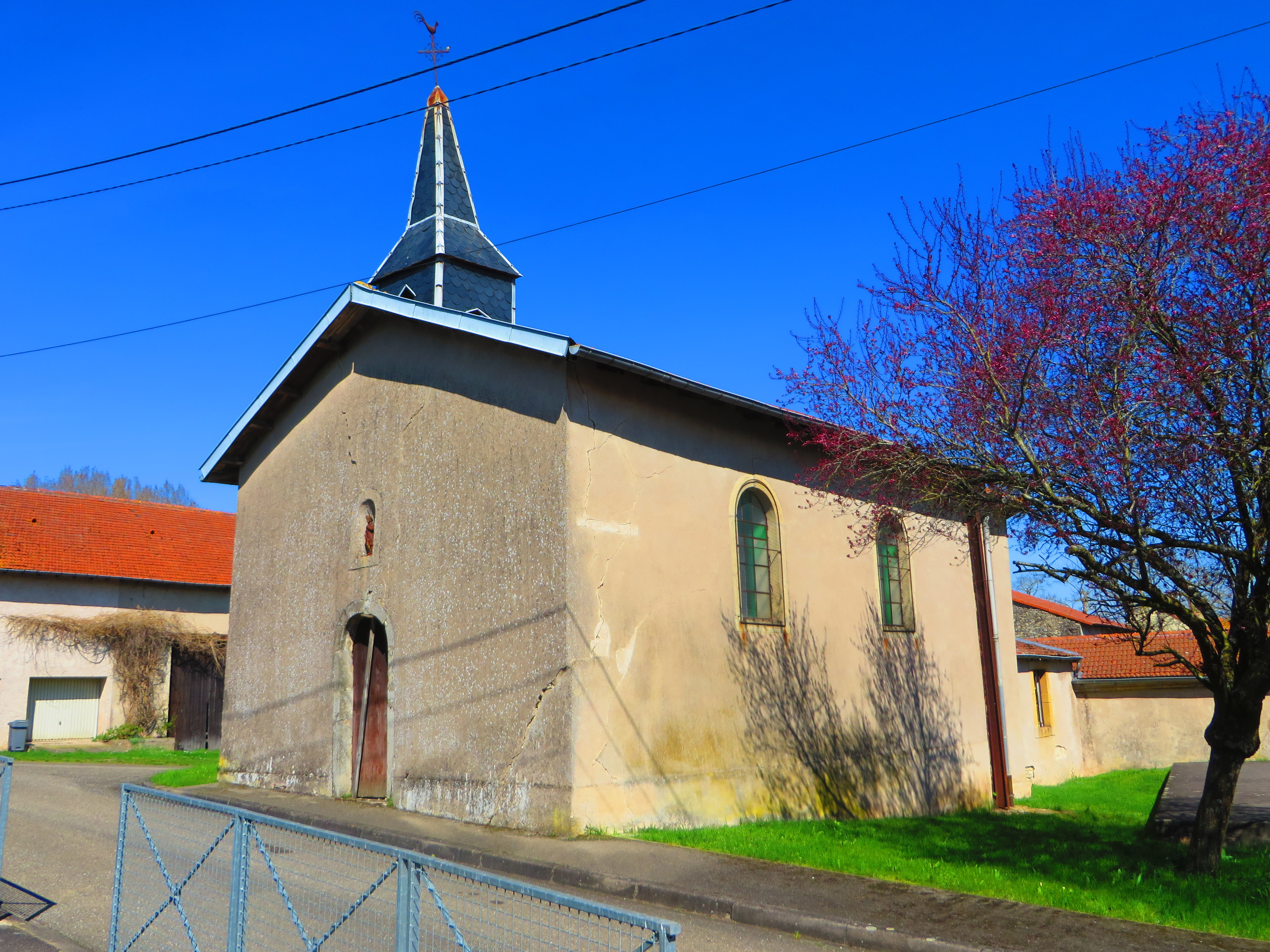
- The church in Thonville

- Coat of arms
- Location of Thonville
- Location within France Location within Grand Est
- Coordinates: 48°59′03″N 6°33′39″E
- Country: France
- Region: Grand Est
- Department: Moselle
- Arrondissement: Forbach-Boulay-Moselle
- Canton: Faulquemont
- Intercommunality: District urbain de Faulquemont

Government
  - Mayor (2020–2026): Bernard Reichert
- Area^{1}: 2.53 km^{2} (0.98 sq mi)
- Elevation: 200 m (660 ft)
- Highest elevation: 311 m (1,020 ft)
- Lowest elevation: 240 m (790 ft)
- Population (2023): 52
  - Density: 21/km^{2} (53/sq mi)
- Time zone: UTC+01:00 (CET)
  - Summer (DST): UTC+02:00 (CEST)
- INSEE/Postal code: 57673 /57380
- ^{1} French Land Register data, which excludes lakes, ponds, glaciers > 1 km^{2} (0.386 sq mi or 247 acres) and river estuaries.

Thonville (French pronunciation: [tɔ̃vil]; German: Odersdorf) is a commune in the Moselle department in Grand Est in north-eastern France.

== See also ==
- Communes of the Moselle department
