= Voimhaut =

- Commune
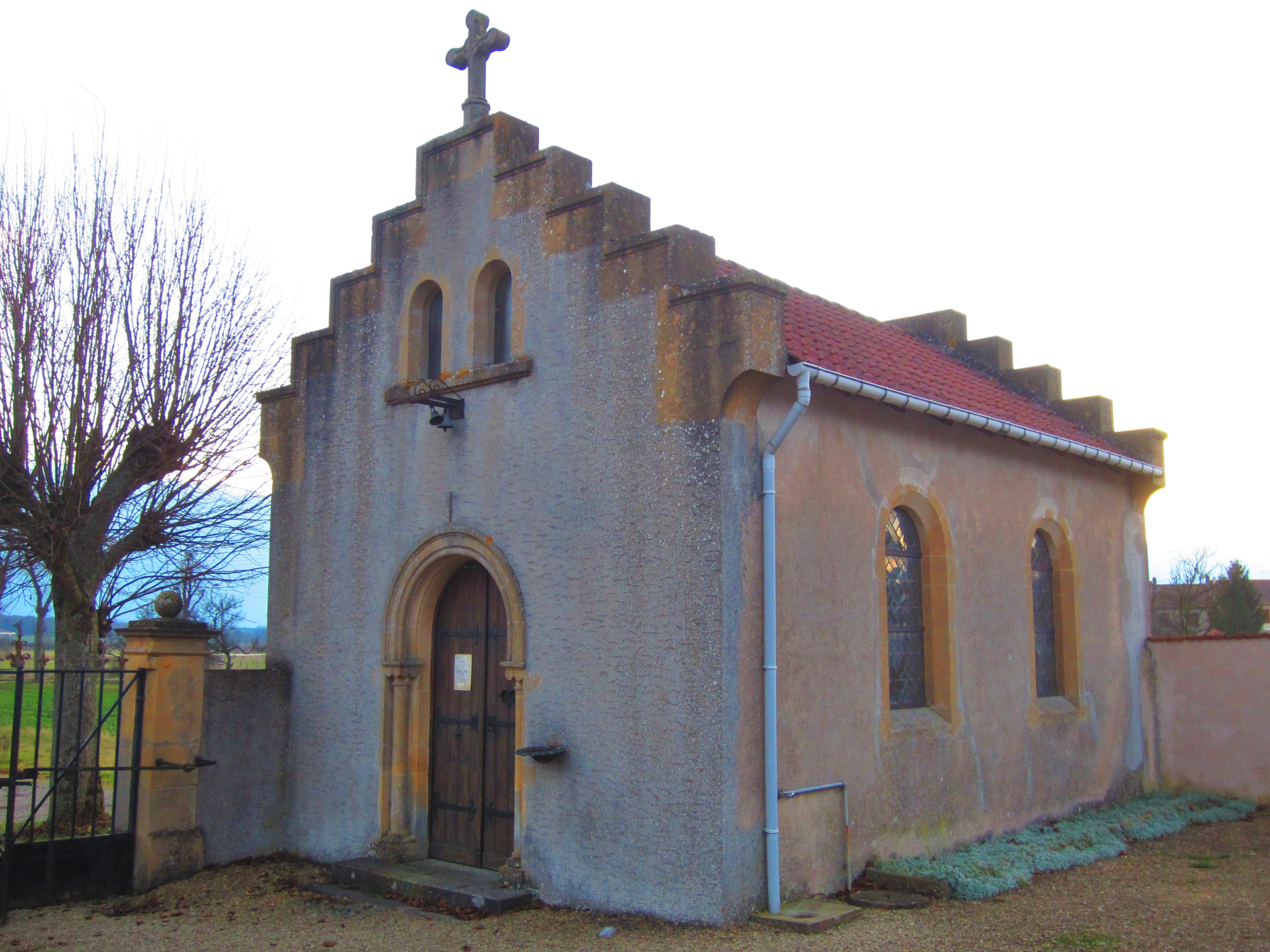
- The cemetery chapel in Voimhaut

- Coat of arms
- Location of Voimhaut
- Location within France Location within Grand Est
- Coordinates: 49°01′20″N 6°25′05″E
- Country: France
- Region: Grand Est
- Department: Moselle
- Arrondissement: Forbach-Boulay-Moselle
- Canton: Faulquemont
- Intercommunality: District Urbain de Faulquemont

Government
  - Mayor (2020–2026): Denis Decker
- Area^{1}: 4.02 km^{2} (1.55 sq mi)
- Elevation: 240 m (790 ft)
- Highest elevation: 302 m (991 ft)
- Lowest elevation: 221 m (725 ft)
- Population (2023): 247
  - Density: 61.4/km^{2} (159/sq mi)
- Time zone: UTC+01:00 (CET)
  - Summer (DST): UTC+02:00 (CEST)
- INSEE/Postal code: 57728 /57580
- ^{1} French Land Register data, which excludes lakes, ponds, glaciers > 1 km^{2} (0.386 sq mi or 247 acres) and river estuaries.

Voimhaut (French pronunciation: [vwamo]; German: Wainwalz) is a commune in the Moselle department in Grand Est in north-eastern France.

== See also ==
- Communes of the Moselle department
