= Hémilly =

- Commune
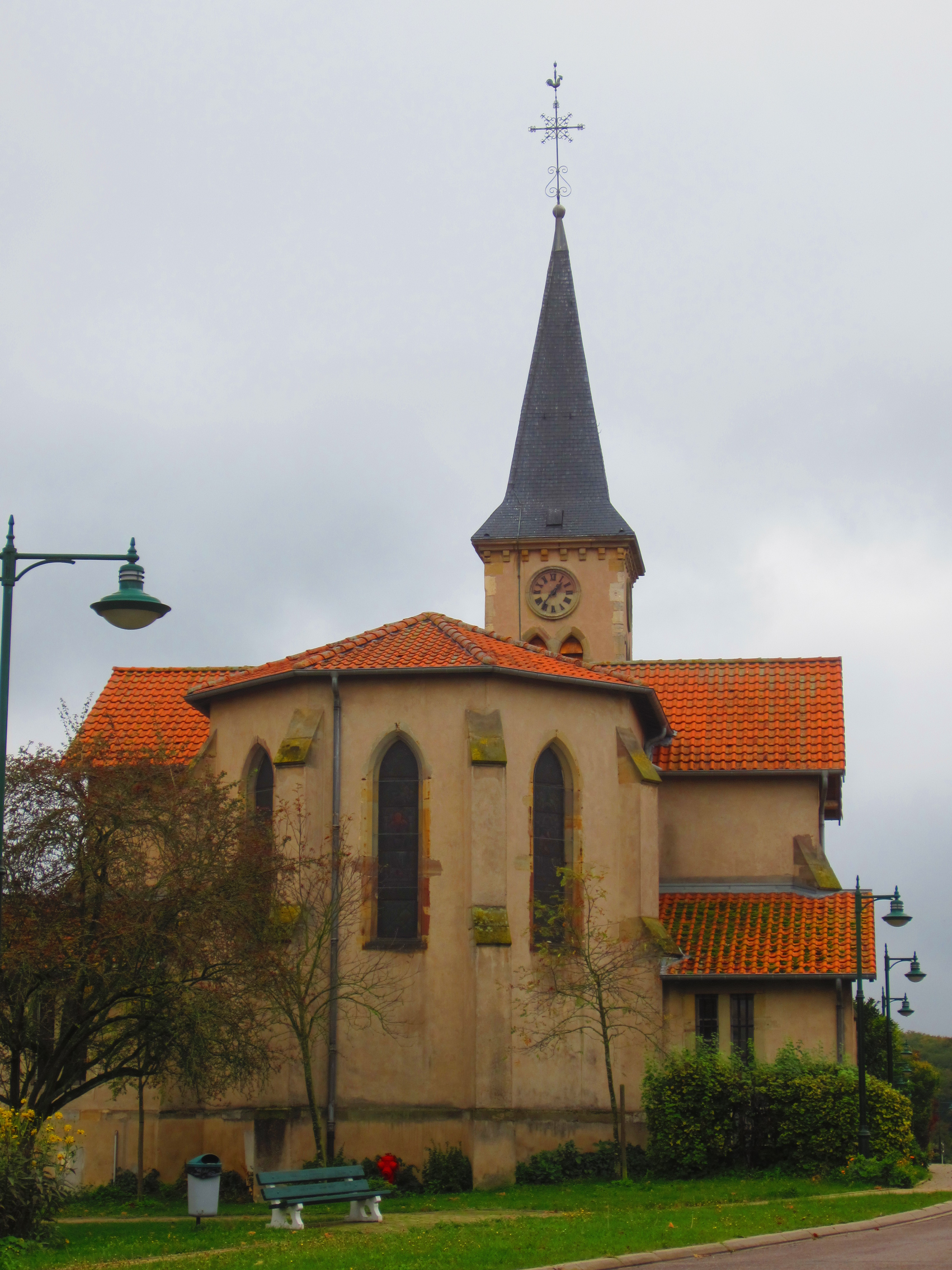
- The church in Hemilly

- Coat of arms
- Location of Hémilly
- Location within France Location within Grand Est
- Coordinates: 49°03′43″N 6°30′08″E
- Country: France
- Region: Grand Est
- Department: Moselle
- Arrondissement: Forbach-Boulay-Moselle
- Canton: Faulquemont
- Intercommunality: District urbain de Faulquemont

Government
  - Mayor (2020–2026): Michel Baylac
- Area^{1}: 14.04 km^{2} (5.42 sq mi)
- Elevation: 260 m (850 ft)
- Highest elevation: 293 m (961 ft)
- Lowest elevation: 238 m (781 ft)
- Population (2023): 136
  - Density: 9.69/km^{2} (25.1/sq mi)
- Time zone: UTC+01:00 (CET)
  - Summer (DST): UTC+02:00 (CEST)
- INSEE/Postal code: 57313 /57690
- ^{1} French Land Register data, which excludes lakes, ponds, glaciers > 1 km^{2} (0.386 sq mi or 247 acres) and river estuaries.

Hémilly (German: Hemelich) is a commune in the Moselle department in Grand Est in north-eastern France.

== See also ==
- Communes of the Moselle department
