= Chanville =

- Commune
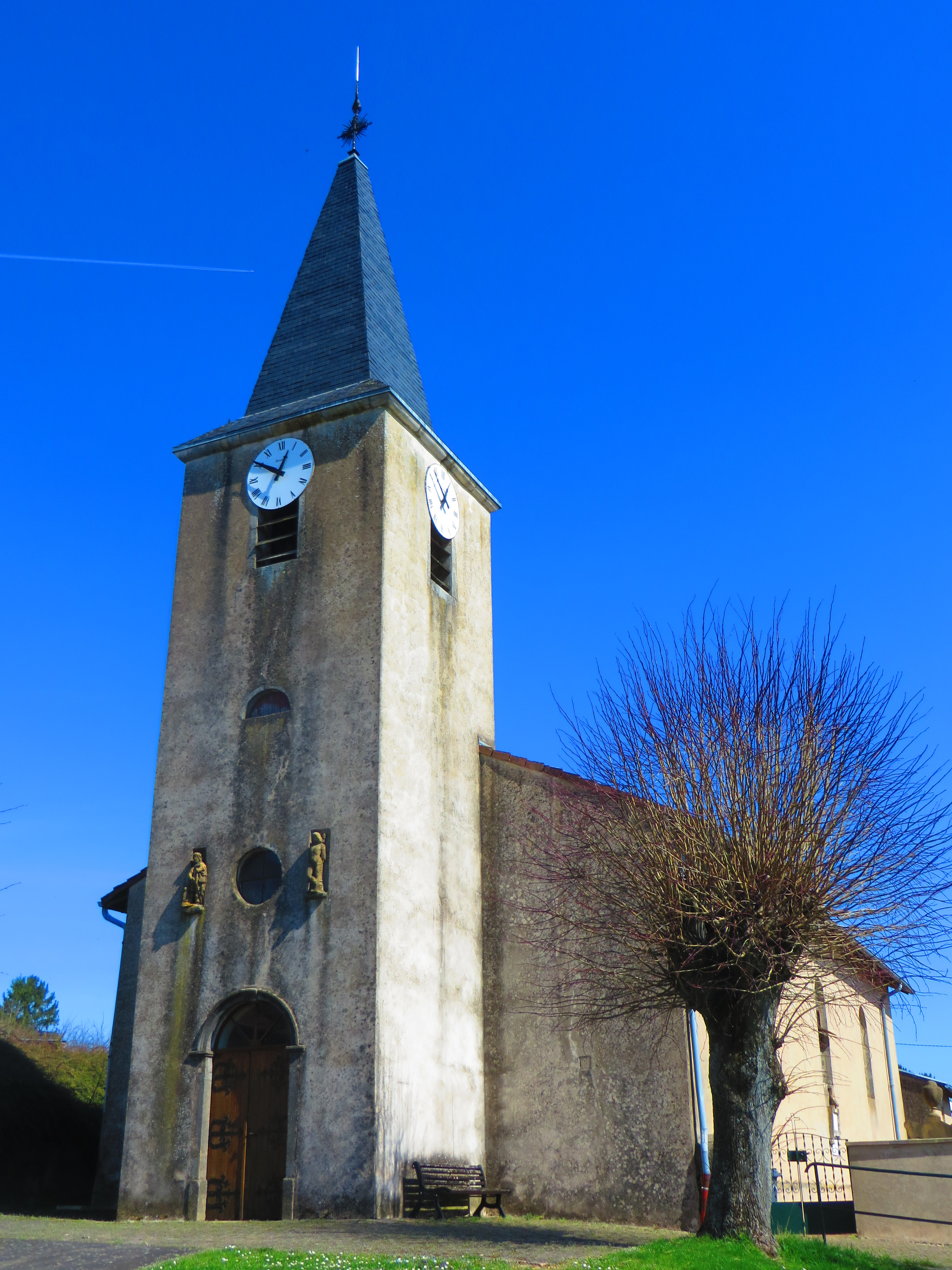
- The church in Chanville

- Coat of arms
- Location of Chanville
- Location within France Location within Grand Est
- Coordinates: 49°02′37″N 6°26′13″E
- Country: France
- Region: Grand Est
- Department: Moselle
- Arrondissement: Metz
- Canton: Faulquemont
- Intercommunality: CC Sud Messin

Government
  - Mayor (2020–2026): Jean-François Hesse
- Area^{1}: 3.89 km^{2} (1.50 sq mi)
- Elevation: 268 m (879 ft)
- Highest elevation: 310 m (1,020 ft)
- Lowest elevation: 233 m (764 ft)
- Population (2023): 147
  - Density: 37.8/km^{2} (97.9/sq mi)
- Time zone: UTC+01:00 (CET)
  - Summer (DST): UTC+02:00 (CEST)
- INSEE/Postal code: 57127 /57580
- ^{1} French Land Register data, which excludes lakes, ponds, glaciers > 1 km^{2} (0.386 sq mi or 247 acres) and river estuaries.

Chanville (French pronunciation: [ʃɑ̃vil]; German: Hanhausen) is a commune in the Moselle department in Grand Est in north-eastern France.

== See also ==
- Communes of the Moselle department
