= Pontoy =

- Commune
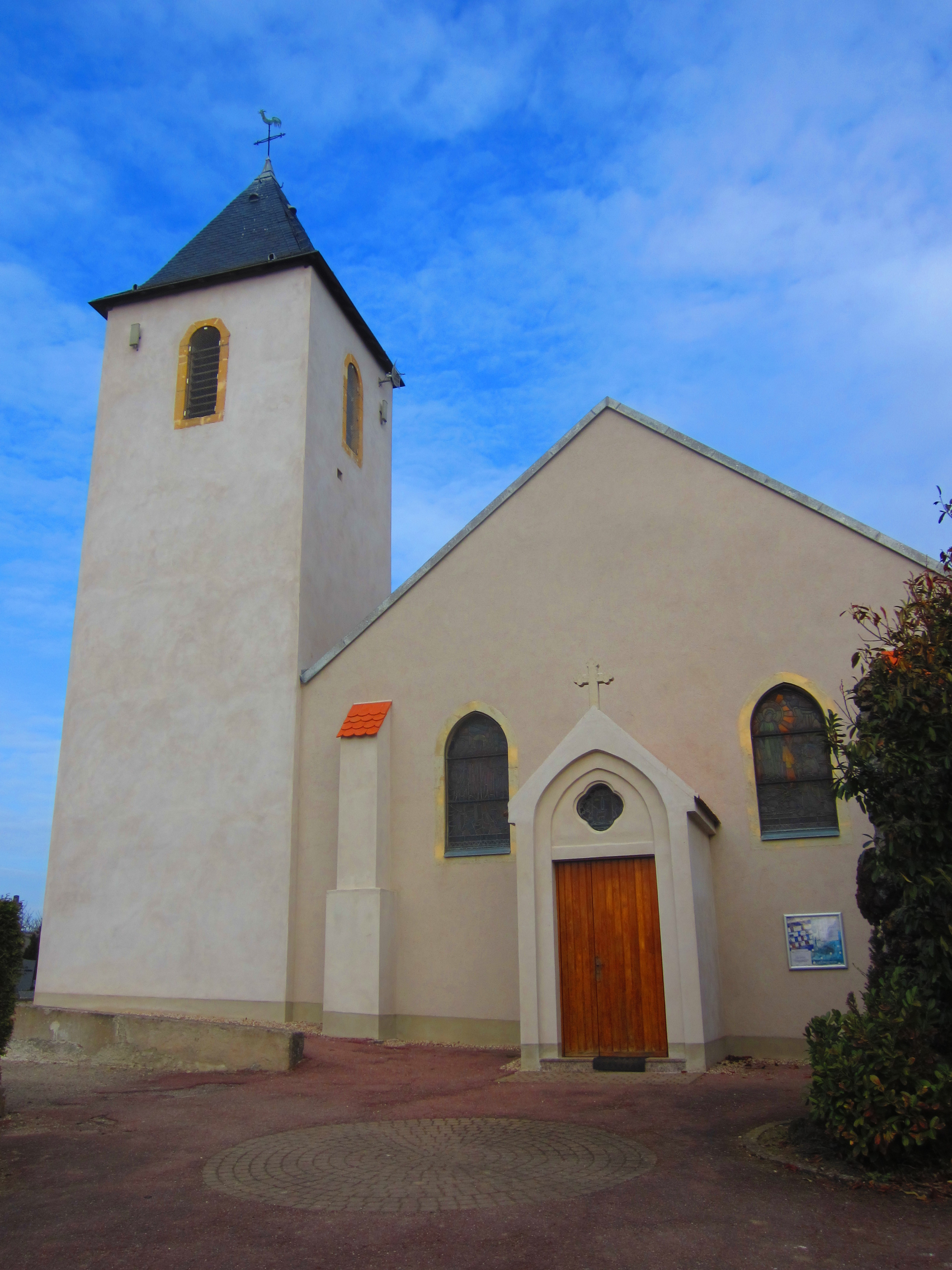
- The church in Pontoy
- Location of Pontoy
- Location within France Location within Grand Est
- Coordinates: 49°01′03″N 6°17′06″E
- Country: France
- Region: Grand Est
- Department: Moselle
- Arrondissement: Metz
- Canton: Faulquemont
- Intercommunality: Sud Messin

Government
  - Mayor (2020–2026): Michel Guerbert
- Area^{1}: 10.12 km^{2} (3.91 sq mi)
- Elevation: 300 m (980 ft)
- Highest elevation: 315 m (1,033 ft)
- Lowest elevation: 222 m (728 ft)
- Population (2023): 613
  - Density: 60.6/km^{2} (157/sq mi)
- Time zone: UTC+01:00 (CET)
  - Summer (DST): UTC+02:00 (CEST)
- INSEE/Postal code: 57548 /57420
- ^{1} French Land Register data, which excludes lakes, ponds, glaciers > 1 km^{2} (0.386 sq mi or 247 acres) and river estuaries.

Pontoy (French pronunciation: [pɔ̃twa]; German: Pontingen) is a commune in the Moselle department in Grand Est in north-eastern France.

== See also ==
- Communes of the Moselle department
