= Arraincourt =

- Commune
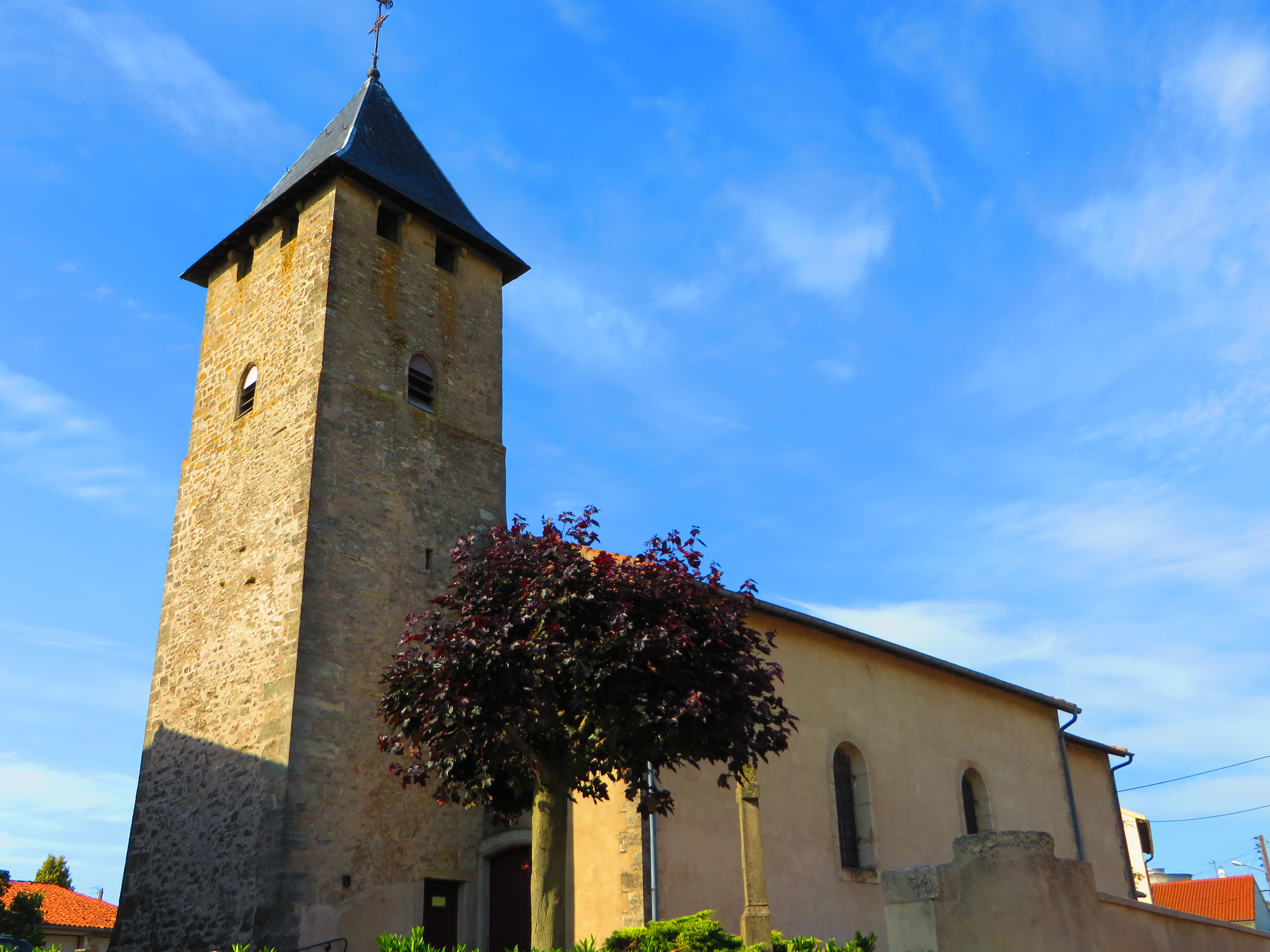
- The church in Arraincourt

- Coat of arms
- Location of Arraincourt
- Location within France Location within Grand Est
- Coordinates: 48°58′26″N 6°32′00″E
- Country: France
- Region: Grand Est
- Department: Moselle
- Arrondissement: Forbach-Boulay-Moselle
- Canton: Faulquemont
- Intercommunality: CC District Urbain Faulquemont

Government
  - Mayor (2020–2026): Évelyne Georges
- Area^{1}: 4.74 km^{2} (1.83 sq mi)
- Elevation: 200 m (660 ft)
- Highest elevation: 291 m (955 ft)
- Lowest elevation: 232 m (761 ft)
- Population (2023): 126
  - Density: 26.6/km^{2} (68.8/sq mi)
- Time zone: UTC+01:00 (CET)
  - Summer (DST): UTC+02:00 (CEST)
- INSEE/Postal code: 57027 /57380
- ^{1} French Land Register data, which excludes lakes, ponds, glaciers > 1 km^{2} (0.386 sq mi or 247 acres) and river estuaries.

Arraincourt (French pronunciation: [aʁɛ̃kuʁ]; German: Armsdorf) is a commune in the Moselle department in Grand Est in northeastern France.

== Population ==
Historical population
Year	Pop.	±% p.a.
1968	157	—
1975	133	−2.34%
1982	118	−1.69%
1990	119	+0.11%
1999	114	−0.48%
2007	123	+0.95%
2012	130	+1.11%
2017	126	−0.62%
2023	126	+0.00%
Source: INSEE

== See also ==
- Communes of the Moselle department
