= Arrondissement of Boulay-Moselle =

Coordinates: 49.18°N 6.50°E

Boulay-Moselle
- Former arrondissement
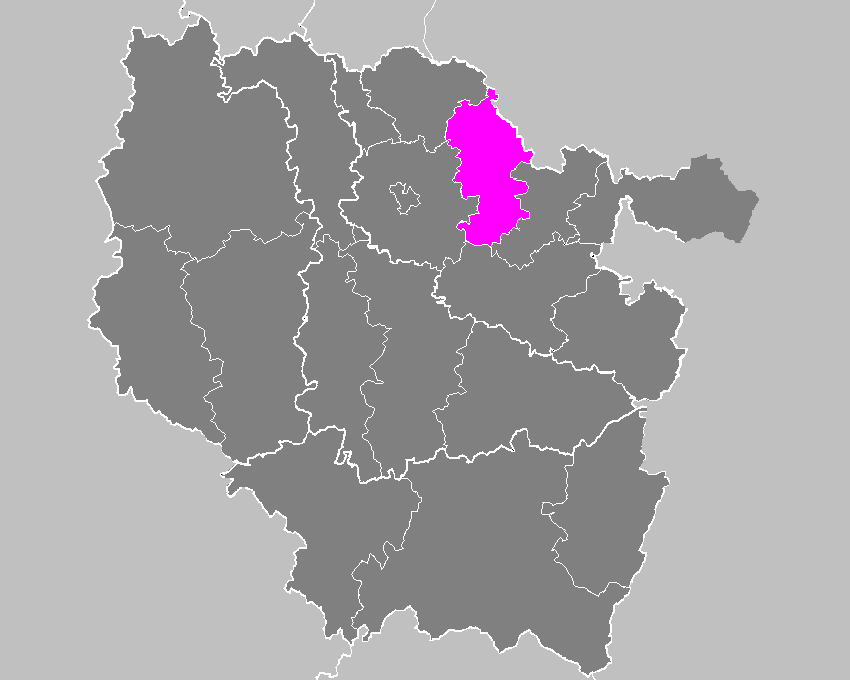
- Location within the former region Lorraine
- Country: France
- Region: Grand Est
- Department: Moselle
- No. of communes: {{{nbcomm}}}
- Disbanded: 2015
- Area: 722 km^{2} (279 sq mi)
- Population (2012): 79,847
  - Density: 111/km^{2} (286/sq mi)

The arrondissement of Boulay-Moselle is a former arrondissement of France in the Moselle department in the Lorraine region. In 2015 it was merged into the new arrondissement of Forbach-Boulay-Moselle. It had 96 communes, and its population was 79,847 (2012).

== Composition ==
The communes of the arrondissement of Boulay-Moselle, and their INSEE codes, were:

1. Adaincourt (57007)	2. Adelange (57008)	3. Alzing (57016)
4. Anzeling (57025)	5. Arraincourt (57027)	6. Arriance (57029)
7. Bambiderstroff (57047)	8. Bannay (57048)	9. Berviller-en-Moselle (57069)
10. Bettange (57070)	11. Bibiche (57079)	12. Bionville-sur-Nied (57085)
13. Bisten-en-Lorraine (57087)	14. Boucheporn (57095)	15. Boulay-Moselle (57097)
16. Bouzonville (57106)	17. Brettnach (57110)	18. Brouck (57112)
19. Château-Rouge (57131)	20. Chémery-les-Deux (57136)	21. Colmen (57149)
22. Condé-Northen (57150)	23. Coume (57154)	24. Creutzwald (57160)
25. Créhange (57159)	26. Dalem (57165)	27. Dalstein (57167)
28. Denting (57172)	29. Elvange (57190)	30. Falck (57205)
31. Faulquemont (57209)	32. Filstroff (57213)	33. Flétrange (57217)
34. Fouligny (57230)	35. Freistroff (57235)	36. Gomelange (57252)
37. Guerstling (57273)	38. Guerting (57274)	39. Guinglange (57276)
40. Guinkirchen (57277)	41. Hallering (57284)	42. Ham-sous-Varsberg (57288)
43. Han-sur-Nied (57293)	44. Hargarten-aux-Mines (57296)	45. Haute-Vigneulles (57714)
46. Heining-lès-Bouzonville (57309)	47. Helstroff (57312)	48. Herny (57319)
49. Hestroff (57322)	50. Hinckange (57326)	51. Holacourt (57328)
52. Holling (57329)	53. Hémilly (57313)	54. Laudrefang (57386)
55. Longeville-lès-Saint-Avold (57413)	56. Mainvillers (57430)	57. Many (57442)
58. Marange-Zondrange (57444)	59. Menskirch (57457)	60. Merten (57460)
61. Momerstroff (57471)	62. Mégange (57455)	63. Narbéfontaine (57495)
64. Neunkirchen-lès-Bouzonville (57502)	65. Niedervisse (57507)	66. Oberdorff (57516)
67. Obervisse (57519)	68. Ottonville (57530)	69. Piblange (57542)
70. Pontpierre (57549)	71. Roupeldange (57599)	72. Rémelfang (57567)
73. Rémering (57570)	74. Saint-François-Lacroix (57610)	75. Schwerdorff (57640)
76. Teting-sur-Nied (57668)	77. Thicourt (57670)	78. Thonville (57673)
79. Tritteling-Redlach (57679)	80. Tromborn (57681)	81. Téterchen (57667)
82. Vahl-lès-Faulquemont (57686)	83. Valmunster (57691)	84. Varize (57695)
85. Varsberg (57696)	86. Vatimont (57698)	87. Vaudreching (57700)
88. Velving (57705)	89. Villing (57720)	90. Vittoncourt (57726)
91. Vœlfling-lès-Bouzonville (57749)	92. Voimhaut (57728)	93. Volmerange-lès-Boulay (57730)
94. Zimming (57762)	95. Ébersviller (57186)	96. Éblange (57187)

== History ==
The arrondissement of Boulay-Moselle was created in 1919. It was disbanded in 2015. As a result of the reorganisation of the cantons of France which came into effect in 2015, the borders of the cantons are no longer related to the borders of the arrondissements. The cantons of the arrondissement of Boulay-Moselle were, as of January 2015:

1. Boulay-Moselle
2. Bouzonville
3. Faulquemont
