= Creutzwald =

- Commune
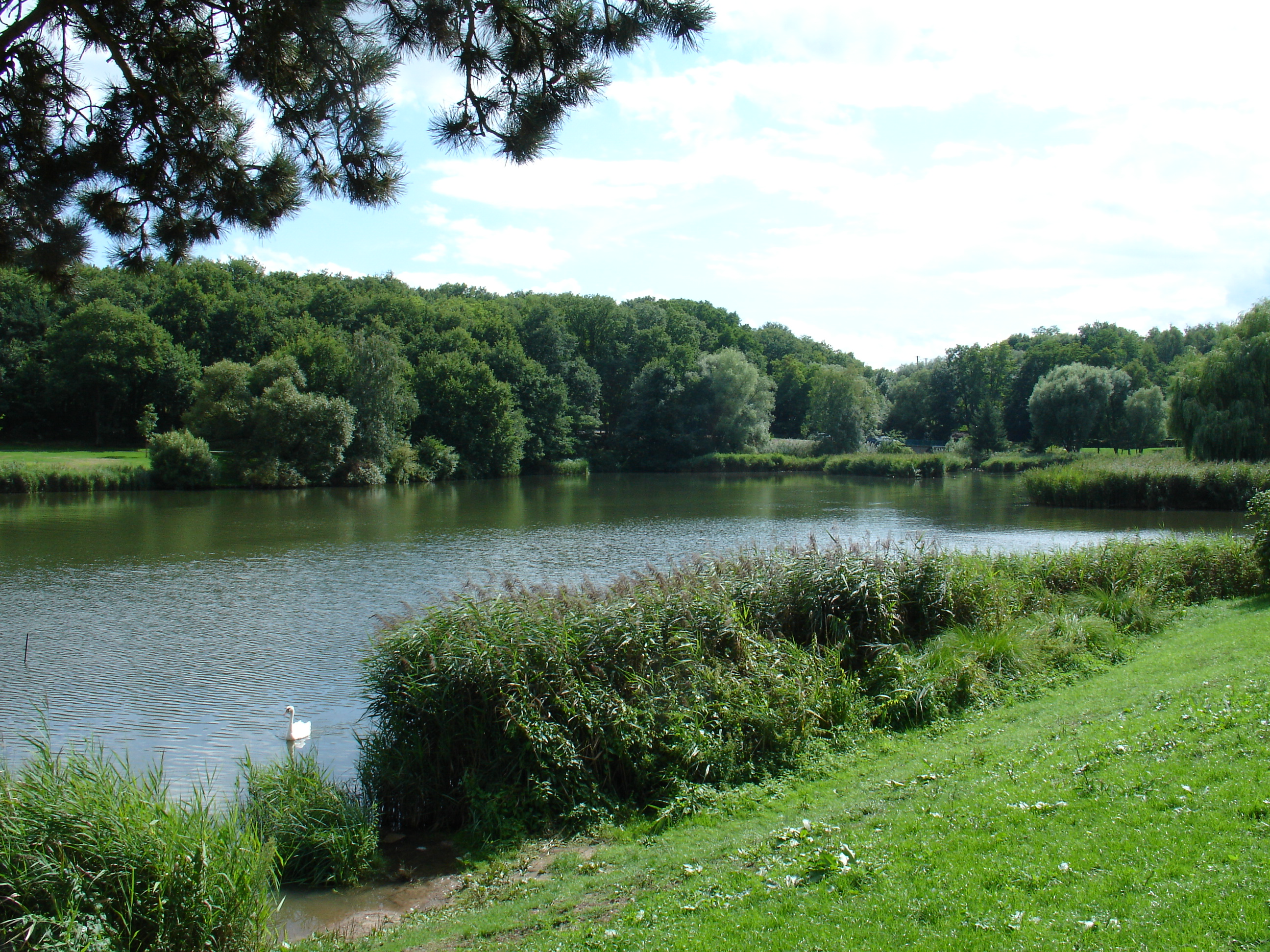
- Creutzwald Lake

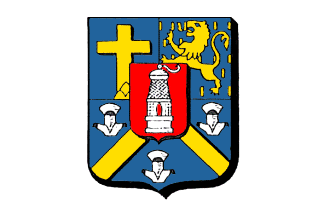
- Flag Coat of arms
- Location of Creutzwald
- Location within France Location within Grand Est
- Coordinates: 49°12′00″N 6°41′00″E
- Country: France
- Region: Grand Est
- Department: Moselle
- Arrondissement: Forbach-Boulay-Moselle
- Canton: Boulay-Moselle
- Intercommunality: Warndt

Government
  - Mayor (2020–2026): Jean-Luc Wozniak
- Area^{1}: 26.72 km^{2} (10.32 sq mi)
- Elevation: 219 m (719 ft)
- Highest elevation: 334 m (1,096 ft)
- Lowest elevation: 198 m (650 ft)
- Population (2023): 12,254
  - Density: 458.6/km^{2} (1,188/sq mi)
- Time zone: UTC+01:00 (CET)
  - Summer (DST): UTC+02:00 (CEST)
- INSEE/Postal code: 57160 /57150
- ^{1} French Land Register data, which excludes lakes, ponds, glaciers > 1 km^{2} (0.386 sq mi or 247 acres) and river estuaries.

Creutzwald (French pronunciation: [kʁøtsvald]; German: Kreuzwald) is a commune in the Moselle département in Grand Est in north-eastern France, located on the German border, just south of Überherrn (with which it is twinned) and west of Lauterbach-Völklingen, both in the Saarland.

With Germany, it manages the Warndt forest.

== History ==
The town was formed in 1810, by the merging of the three villages of La Croix, La Houve, and Wilhelmsbronn. It continued to be known as Creutzwald-la-Croix until 1961, when the name was simplified. Until that point, it had been redundant, as the German word Kreuz, and French Croix both mean "cross".

Like the other communes of the present-day Moselle department, Creutzwald was annexed to the German Empire from 1871 to 1918.

During the Second World War, the commune was annexed by the Third Reich. It was not liberated until December 1944.

Creutzwald was the last town in France to have a working coal mine, in La Houve, which closed on 23 April 2004.

== Population ==
Historical population
Year	Pop.	±% p.a.
1968	14,471	—
1975	15,540	+1.02%
1982	15,060	−0.45%
1990	15,169	+0.09%
1999	14,360	−0.61%
2007	13,468	−0.80%
2012	13,607	+0.21%
2017	13,095	−0.76%
2023	12,254	−1.10%
Source: INSEE

== Administration ==
Together with the municipalities of Bisten-en-Lorraine, Guerting, Ham-sous-Varsberg and Varsberg, it forms the Communauté de communes of Warndt, of which it is the seat. Since 2015, it is part of the canton of Boulay-Moselle.

== Industrial and handcraft activities ==
=== Glass ===
The first industrial development of the commune was linked to glass, thanks to the abundance of wood in the forests and the presence of silica sand in the soil. The first glass factories were set up between 1602 and 1603 by the Condé family, gentlemen glassmakers from Champagne. Several glass factories operated simultaneously in Creutzwald until the middle of the 17th century, when they gradually declined. The last one, La Houve, was established in 1705 to revive the activity, and was bought by the glass factory of Meisenthal in 1843.

=== Steel and iron ===
The iron and steel industry started in the La Houve forest. It was initiated by the Quien family, who installed two blast furnaces initially fuelled by charcoal. The hydraulic power produced by the water of the Bisten enabled the blowers to be put into action to increase the temperature in the furnaces. The iron industry flourished until the revolution, which stopped this activity. In 1814, François Payssé revived the iron and steel production. Then the factory passed into the hands of the Schlincker family. The blast furnaces were shut down and only the cast iron casting remained. The Quinchez family took over the running of the company. Finally, in 1929, the factory was directed by the Schmitt brothers. It was closed after the Second World War.

== Media ==
Since February 1988, Creutzwald has been notable for having its own television channel called 'CVS', currently led by the wider 'ÉNES' electricity board. One of the first local television stations of its kind in France, 'CVS' runs a weekly broadcast of around 30 minutes, which informs the town's inhabitants of current affairs taking place in and around Creutzwald. The channel is available at all hours of the day, and will often run important news and announcements otherwise.

== See also ==
- Communes of the Moselle department
