= Volmerange =

Volmerange may refer to two communes in the Moselle department in north-eastern France:

- Volmerange-lès-Boulay
- Volmerange-les-Mines
