= Communes of the Moselle department =

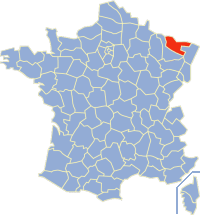

The following is a list of the 725 communes of the Moselle department of France.

The communes cooperate in the following intercommunalities (as of 2025):

- Metz Métropole
- Communauté d'agglomération de Forbach Porte de France
- Communauté d'agglomération Portes de France-Thionville
- Communauté d'agglomération Saint-Avold Synergie
- Communauté d'agglomération Sarreguemines Confluences (partly)
- Communauté d'agglomération du Val de Fensch
- Communauté de communes de l'Arc Mosellan
- Communauté de communes Bouzonvillois - Trois Frontières
- Communauté de communes de Cattenom et environs
- Communauté de communes du District Urbain de Faulquemont
- Communauté de communes de Freyming-Merlebach
- Communauté de communes Haut Chemin - Pays de Pange
- Communauté de communes de la Houve et du Pays Boulageois
- Communauté de communes Mad et Moselle (partly)
- Communauté de communes du Pays de Bitche
- Communauté de communes du Pays Haut Val d'Alzette (partly)
- Communauté de communes du Pays Orne-Moselle
- Communauté de communes du Pays de Phalsbourg
- Communauté de communes Rives de Moselle
- Communauté de communes de Sarrebourg - Moselle Sud
- Communauté de communes du Saulnois
- Communauté de communes du Sud Messin
- Communauté de communes du Warndt

INSEE code	Postal code	Commune
57001	57920	Aboncourt
57002	57590	Aboncourt-sur-Seille
57003	57560	Abreschviller
57004	57340	Achain
57006	57412	Achen
57007	57580	Adaincourt
57008	57380	Adelange
57009	57590	Ajoncourt
57010	57590	Alaincourt-la-Côte
57011	57670	Albestroff
57012	57440	Algrange
57013	57515	Alsting
57014	57660	Altrippe
57015	57730	Altviller
57016	57320	Alzing
57017	57865	Amanvillers
57018	57170	Amelécourt
57019	57360	Amnéville
57020	57580	Ancerville
57021	57130	Ancy-Dornot
57022	57440	Angevillers
57024	57640	Antilly
57025	57320	Anzeling
57026	57480	Apach
57028	57640	Argancy
57027	57380	Arraincourt
57029	57580	Arriance
57030	57680	Arry
57031	57530	Ars-Laquenexy
57032	57130	Ars-sur-Moselle
57033	57405	Arzviller
57034	57790	Aspach
57035	57260	Assenoncourt
57036	57170	Attilloncourt
57037	57580	Aube
57038	57390	Audun-le-Tiche
57039	57685	Augny
57040	57590	Aulnois-sur-Seille
57041	57710	Aumetz
57042	57810	Avricourt
57043	57300	Ay-sur-Moselle
57044	57810	Azoudange
57045	57590	Bacourt
57046	57230	Baerenthal
57047	57690	Bambiderstroff
57048	57220	Bannay
57049	57050	Le Ban-Saint-Martin
57050	57830	Barchain
57051	57340	Baronville
57052	57450	Barst
57287	57970	Basse-Ham
57574	57570	Basse-Rentgen
57053	57260	Bassing
57054	57580	Baudrecourt
57055	57530	Bazoncourt
57056	57830	Bébing
57057	57580	Béchy
57058	57460	Behren-lès-Forbach
57059	57340	Bellange
57086	57930	Belles-Forêts
57060	57670	Bénestroff
57061	57800	Béning-lès-Saint-Avold
57062	57570	Berg-sur-Moselle
57063	57660	Bérig-Vintrange
57064	57370	Berling
57065	57340	Bermering
57066	57930	Berthelming
57067	57310	Bertrange
57069	57550	Berviller-en-Moselle
57070	57220	Bettange
57071	57930	Bettborn
57072	57640	Bettelainville
57073	57800	Betting
57074	57410	Bettviller
57075	57580	Beux
57076	57570	Beyren-lès-Sierck
57077	57630	Bezange-la-Petite
57079	57320	Bibiche
57080	57635	Bickenholtz
57081	57260	Bidestroff
57082	57660	Biding
57083	57410	Bining
57084	57170	Bioncourt
57085	57220	Bionville-sur-Nied
57087	57220	Bisten-en-Lorraine
57088	57660	Bistroff
57089	57230	Bitche
57090	57260	Blanche-Église
57091	57200	Bliesbruck
57092	57200	Blies-Ébersing
57093	57200	Blies-Guersviller
57095	57220	Boucheporn
57096	57655	Boulange
57097	57220	Boulay-Moselle
57099	57810	Bourdonnay
57098	57260	Bourgaltroff
57100	57370	Bourscheid
57101	57460	Bousbach
57102	57310	Bousse
57103	57230	Bousseviller
57104	57570	Boust
57105	57380	Boustroff
57106	57320	Bouzonville
57107	57340	Bréhain
57108	57720	Breidenbach
57109	57570	Breistroff-la-Grande
57110	57320	Brettnach
57111	57535	Bronvaux
57112	57220	Brouck
57113	57565	Brouderdorff
57114	57635	Brouviller
57115	57340	Brulange
57116	57420	Buchy
57117	57920	Buding
57118	57970	Budling
57119	57400	Buhl-Lorraine
57120	57170	Burlioncourt
57121	57220	Burtoncourt
57122	57450	Cappel
57123	57490	Carling
57124	57570	Cattenom
57125	57365	Chailly-lès-Ennery
57126	57170	Chambrey
57127	57580	Chanville
57128	57220	Charleville-sous-Bois
57129	57640	Charly-Oradour
57130	57340	Château-Bréhain
57131	57320	Château-Rouge
57132	57170	Château-Salins
57133	57170	Château-Voué
57134	57160	Châtel-Saint-Germain
57136	57320	Chémery-les-Deux
57137	57420	Cheminot
57138	57580	Chenois
57139	57420	Chérisey
57140	57245	Chesny
57141	57590	Chicourt
57142	57070	Chieulles
57143	57185	Clouange
57144	57800	Cocheren
57145	57530	Coincy
57146	57420	Coin-lès-Cuvry
57147	57420	Coin-sur-Seille
57148	57530	Colligny-Maizery
57149	57320	Colmen
57150	57220	Condé-Northen
57151	57340	Conthil
57152	57480	Contz-les-Bains
57153	57680	Corny-sur-Moselle
57154	57220	Coume
57155	57530	Courcelles-Chaussy
57156	57530	Courcelles-sur-Nied
57158	57590	Craincourt
57159	57690	Créhange
57160	57150	Creutzwald
57161	57260	Cutting
57162	57420	Cuvry
57163	57850	Dabo
57165	57550	Dalem
57166	57340	Dalhain
57167	57320	Dalstein
57168	57370	Danne-et-Quatre-Vents
57169	57820	Dannelbourg
57171	57590	Delme
57172	57220	Denting
57173	57930	Desseling
57174	57340	Destry
57175	57830	Diane-Capelle
57176	57980	Diebling
57765	57890	Diesen
57177	57260	Dieuze
57178	57660	Diffembach-lès-Hellimer
57179	57925	Distroff
57180	57400	Dolving
57181	57260	Domnom-lès-Dieuze
57182	57590	Donjeux
57183	57810	Donnelay
57186	57320	Ébersviller
57187	57220	Éblange
57188	57230	Éguelshardt
57189	57340	Eincheville
57190	57690	Elvange
57191	57970	Elzange
57192	57415	Enchenberg
57193	57365	Ennery
57194	57330	Entrange
57195	57720	Epping
57196	57720	Erching
57197	57510	Ernestviller
57198	57660	Erstroff
57199	57330	Escherange
57200	57530	Les Étangs
57201	57412	Etting
57202	57460	Etzling
57203	57570	Évrange
57204	57640	Failly
57205	57550	Falck
57206	57290	Fameck
57207	57450	Farébersviller
57208	57450	Farschviller
57209	57380	Faulquemont
57210	57930	Fénétrange
57211	57280	Fèves
57212	57420	Féy
57213	57320	Filstroff
57214	57570	Fixem
57215	57320	Flastroff
57216	57635	Fleisheim
57217	57690	Flétrange
57218	57420	Fleury
57219	57365	Flévy
57220	57580	Flocourt
57221	57190	Florange
57222	57600	Folkling
57224	57730	Folschviller
57225	57590	Fonteny
57226	57650	Fontoy
57227	57600	Forbach
57228	57590	Fossieux
57229	57830	Foulcrey
57230	57220	Fouligny
57231	57420	Foville
57232	57670	Francaltroff
57233	57790	Fraquelfing
57234	57200	Frauenberg
57235	57320	Freistroff
57236	57590	Frémery
57237	57660	Frémestroff
57238	57170	Fresnes-en-Saulnois
57239	57660	Freybouse
57240	57800	Freyming-Merlebach
57241	57810	Fribourg
57242	57175	Gandrange
57244	57820	Garrebourg
57245	57570	Gavisse
57246	57260	Gelucourt
57247	57170	Gerbécourt
57248	57670	Givrycourt
57249	57530	Glatigny
57250	57620	Goetzenbruck
57251	57420	Goin
57252	57220	Gomelange
57253	57815	Gondrexange
57254	57680	Gorze
57255	57930	Gosselming
57256	57130	Gravelotte
57257	57170	Grémecey
57258	57660	Gréning
57259	57480	Grindorff-Bizing
57260	57520	Grosbliederstroff
57261	57410	Gros-Réderching
57262	57660	Grostenquin
57263	57510	Grundviller
57264	57510	Guebenhouse
57265	57260	Guébestroff
57266	57260	Guéblange-lès-Dieuze
57268	57260	Guébling
57269	57310	Guénange
57271	57470	Guenviller
57272	57260	Guermange
57273	57320	Guerstling
57274	57880	Guerting
57275	57380	Guessling-Hémering
57276	57690	Guinglange
57277	57220	Guinkirchen
57278	57670	Guinzeling
57280	57405	Guntzviller
57281	57340	Haboudange
57282	57570	Hagen
57283	57300	Hagondange
57284	57690	Hallering
57286	57480	Halstroff
57289	57910	Hambach
57290	57170	Hampont
57288	57880	Ham-sous-Varsberg
57291	57370	Hangviller
57292	57590	Hannocourt
57293	57580	Han-sur-Nied
57294	57230	Hanviller
57295	57630	Haraucourt-sur-Seille
57296	57550	Hargarten-aux-Mines
57297	57340	Harprich
57298	57870	Harreberg
57299	57870	Hartzviller
57300	57850	Haselbourg
57301	57230	Haspelschiedt
57302	57790	Hattigny
57303	57280	Hauconcourt
57304	57400	Haut-Clocher
57371	57480	Haute-Kontz
57714	57690	Haute-Vigneulles
57305	57650	Havange
57306	57700	Hayange
57307	57530	Hayes
57308	57430	Hazembourg
57309	57320	Heining-lès-Bouzonville
57310	57930	Hellering-lès-Fénétrange
57311	57660	Hellimer
57312	57220	Helstroff
57313	57690	Hémilly
57314	57830	Héming
57315	57820	Henridorff
57316	57450	Henriville
57317	57635	Hérange
57318	57790	Hermelange
57319	57580	Herny
57320	57830	Hertzing
57321	57400	Hesse
57322	57320	Hestroff
57323	57330	Hettange-Grande
57324	57400	Hilbesheim
57325	57510	Hilsprich
57326	57220	Hinckange
57328	57380	Holacourt
57329	57220	Holling
57330	57510	Holving
57331	57920	Hombourg-Budange
57332	57470	Hombourg-Haut
57333	57405	Hommarting
57334	57870	Hommert
57335	57670	Honskirch
57336	57490	L'Hôpital
57337	57510	Hoste
57338	57720	Hottviller
57339	57820	Hultehouse
57340	57990	Hundling
57341	57480	Hunting
57342	57830	Ibigny
57343	57970	Illange
57344	57400	Imling
57345	57970	Inglange
57346	57670	Insming
57347	57670	Insviller
57348	57990	Ippling
57349	57590	Jallaucourt
57350	57130	Jouy-aux-Arches
57351	57245	Jury
57352	57130	Jussy
57353	57630	Juvelize
57354	57590	Juville
57355	57412	Kalhausen
57356	57330	Kanfen
57357	57430	Kappelkinger
57358	57920	Kédange-sur-Canner
57359	57920	Kemplich
57360	57460	Kerbach
57361	57480	Kerling-lès-Sierck
57362	57830	Kerprich-aux-Bois
57364	57480	Kirsch-lès-Sierck
57365	57480	Kirschnaumen
57366	57430	Kirviller
57367	57920	Klang
57368	57240	Knutange
57370	57970	Kœnigsmacker
57372	57970	Kuntzig
57373	57730	Lachambre
57374	57560	Lafrimbolle
57375	57810	Lagarde
57376	57410	Lambach
57377	57830	Landange
57379	57340	Landroff
57381	57590	Laneuveville-en-Saulnois
57380	57790	Laneuveville-lès-Lorquin
57382	57400	Langatte

INSEE code	Postal code	Commune
57383	57810	Languimberg
57384	57660	Laning
57385	57530	Laquenexy
57386	57385	Laudrefang
57387	57480	Laumesfeld
57388	57480	Launstroff
57389	57660	Lelling
57390	57620	Lemberg
57391	57590	Lemoncourt
57392	57580	Lemud
57393	57720	Lengelsheim
57394	57670	Léning
57395	57580	Lesse
57396	57160	Lessy
57397	57810	Ley
57398	57660	Leyviller
57399	57630	Lezey
57410	57670	Lhor
57401	57340	Lidrezing
57402	57230	Liederschiedt
57403	57420	Liéhon
57404	57260	Lindre-Basse
57405	57260	Lindre-Haute
57406	57590	Liocourt
57407	57635	Lixheim
57408	57520	Lixing-lès-Rouhling
57409	57660	Lixing-lès-Saint-Avold
57411	57650	Lommerange
57412	57050	Longeville-lès-Metz
57413	57740	Longeville-lès-Saint-Avold
57414	57790	Lorquin
57415	57050	Lorry-lès-Metz
57416	57420	Lorry-Mardigny
57417	57670	Lostroff
57418	57670	Loudrefing
57419	57510	Loupershouse
57421	57720	Loutzviller
57422	57420	Louvigny
57423	57170	Lubécourt
57424	57590	Lucy
57425	57580	Luppy
57426	57935	Luttange
57427	57820	Lutzelbourg
57428	57730	Macheren
57430	57380	Mainvillers
57431	57530	Maizeroy
57433	57280	Maizières-lès-Metz
57434	57810	Maizières-lès-Vic
57436	57590	Malaucourt-sur-Seille
57437	57480	Malling
57438	57640	Malroy
57439	57480	Manderen-Ritzing
57440	57590	Manhoué
57441	57100	Manom
57442	57380	Many
57443	57535	Marange-Silvange
57444	57690	Marange-Zondrange
57445	57420	Marieulles
57446	57670	Marimont-lès-Bénestroff
57447	57155	Marly
57448	57630	Marsal
57449	57530	Marsilly
57451	57340	Marthille
57452	57140	La Maxe
57453	57660	Maxstadt
57454	57245	Mécleuves
57455	57220	Mégange
57456	57960	Meisenthal
57457	57320	Menskirch
57459	57480	Merschweiller
57460	57550	Merten
57461	57560	Métairies-Saint-Quirin
57462	57370	Metting
57463	57000	Metz
57464	57920	Metzeresche
57465	57940	Metzervisse
57466	57980	Metzing
57467	57070	Mey
57468	57370	Mittelbronn
57469	57930	Mittersheim
57470	57670	Molring
57471	57220	Momerstroff
57472	57420	Moncheux
57473	57810	Moncourt
57474	57300	Mondelange
57475	57570	Mondorff
57476	57920	Monneren
57477	57415	Montbronn
57478	57670	Montdidier
57479	57480	Montenach
57480	57950	Montigny-lès-Metz
57481	57860	Montois-la-Montagne
57483	57340	Morhange
57484	57600	Morsbach
57485	57170	Morville-lès-Vic
57486	57590	Morville-sur-Nied
57487	57160	Moulins-lès-Metz
57488	57770	Moussey
57489	57620	Mouterhouse
57490	57630	Moyenvic
57491	57250	Moyeuvre-Grande
57492	57250	Moyeuvre-Petite
57493	57260	Mulcey
57494	57670	Munster
57495	57220	Narbéfontaine
57496	57670	Nébing
57497	57670	Nelling
57498	57700	Neufchef
57499	57910	Neufgrange
57500	57830	Neufmoulins
57501	57670	Neufvillage
57502	57320	Neunkirchen-lès-Bouzonville
57504	57560	Niderhoff
57505	57565	Niderviller
57506	57930	Niederstinzel
57507	57220	Niedervisse
57508	57240	Nilvange
57509	57790	Nitting
57510	57645	Noisseville
57511	57140	Norroy-le-Veneur
57512	57645	Nouilly
57513	57720	Nousseviller-lès-Bitche
57514	57990	Nousseviller-Saint-Nabor
57515	57680	Novéant-sur-Moselle
57516	57320	Oberdorff
57517	57720	Obergailbach
57518	57930	Oberstinzel
57519	57220	Obervisse
57520	57170	Obreck
57521	57600	Œting
57482	57645	Ogy-Montoy-Flanville
57524	57810	Ommeray
57525	57590	Oriocourt
57526	57720	Ormersviller
57527	57420	Orny
57528	57590	Oron
57529	57840	Ottange
57530	57220	Ottonville
57531	57970	Oudrenne
57532	57420	Pagny-lès-Goin
57533	57530	Pange
57534	57245	Peltre
57537	57540	Petite-Rosselle
57535	57410	Petit-Réderching
57536	57660	Petit-Tenquin
57538	57170	Pettoncourt
57539	57340	Pévange
57540	57370	Phalsbourg
57541	57230	Philippsbourg
57542	57220	Piblange
57543	57120	Pierrevillers
57544	57870	Plaine-de-Walsch
57545	57050	Plappeville
57546	57140	Plesnois
57547	57420	Pommérieux
57548	57420	Pontoy
57549	57380	Pontpierre
57550	57890	Porcelette
57551	57930	Postroff
57552	57420	Pouilly
57553	57420	Pournoy-la-Chétive
57554	57420	Pournoy-la-Grasse
57555	57590	Prévocourt
57556	57510	Puttelange-aux-Lacs
57557	57570	Puttelange-lès-Thionville
57558	57170	Puttigny
57559	57590	Puzieux
57560	57340	Racrange
57561	57410	Rahling
57562	57700	Ranguevaux
57563	57530	Raville
57564	57810	Réchicourt-le-Château
57565	57390	Rédange
57566	57445	Réding
57567	57320	Rémelfang
57568	57200	Rémelfing
57569	57480	Rémeling
57570	57550	Rémering
57571	57510	Rémering-lès-Puttelange
57572	57580	Rémilly
57573	57670	Réning
57575	57645	Retonfey
57576	57480	Rettel
57577	57230	Reyersviller
57578	57130	Rezonville-Vionville
57579	57810	Rhodes
57580	57340	Riche
57581	57510	Richeling
57582	57270	Richemont
57583	57830	Richeval
57584	57720	Rimling
57586	57840	Rochonvillers
57587	57340	Rodalbe
57588	57570	Rodemack
57589	57410	Rohrbach-lès-Bitche
57590	57720	Rolbing
57591	57120	Rombas
57592	57930	Romelfing
57593	57860	Roncourt
57594	57230	Roppeviller
57595	57260	Rorbach-lès-Dieuze
57596	57800	Rosbruck
57597	57780	Rosselange
57598	57520	Rouhling
57599	57220	Roupeldange
57600	57330	Roussy-le-Village
57601	57160	Rozérieulles
57602	57310	Rurange-lès-Thionville
57603	57390	Russange
57604	57480	Rustroff
57605	57420	Sailly-Achâtel
57606	57500	Saint-Avold
57607	57640	Sainte-Barbe
57620	57255	Sainte-Marie-aux-Chênes
57609	57580	Saint-Epvre
57624	57130	Sainte-Ruffine
57610	57320	Saint-François-Lacroix
57611	57830	Saint-Georges
57612	57640	Saint-Hubert
57613	57930	Saint-Jean-de-Bassel
57614	57370	Saint-Jean-Kourtzerode
57615	57510	Saint-Jean-Rohrbach
57616	57070	Saint-Julien-lès-Metz
57617	57420	Saint-Jure
57618	57820	Saint-Louis
57619	57620	Saint-Louis-lès-Bitche
57621	57260	Saint-Médard
57622	57855	Saint-Privat-la-Montagne
57623	57560	Saint-Quirin
57625	57170	Salonnes
57626	57640	Sanry-lès-Vigy
57627	57530	Sanry-sur-Nied
57628	57430	Sarralbe
57629	57400	Sarraltroff
57630	57400	Sarrebourg
57631	57200	Sarreguemines
57633	57905	Sarreinsming
57634	57140	Saulny
57635	57370	Schalbach
57636	57412	Schmittviller
57637	57400	Schneckenbusch
57638	57350	Schœneck
57639	57230	Schorbach
57640	57320	Schwerdorff
57641	57720	Schweyen
57642	57160	Scy-Chazelles
57643	57420	Secourt
57644	57455	Seingbouse
57645	57280	Semécourt
57647	57290	Serémange-Erzange
57648	57530	Servigny-lès-Raville
57649	57640	Servigny-lès-Sainte-Barbe
57650	57480	Sierck-les-Bains
57651	57410	Siersthal
57652	57420	Sillegny
57653	57420	Silly-en-Saulnois
57654	57530	Silly-sur-Nied
57655	57420	Solgne
57656	57580	Sorbey
57657	57170	Sotzeling
57658	57960	Soucht
57659	57350	Spicheren
57660	57350	Stiring-Wendel
57767	57970	Stuckange
57661	57230	Sturzelbronn
57662	57340	Suisse
57663	57525	Talange
57664	57260	Tarquimpol
57665	57980	Tenteling
57666	57180	Terville
57667	57220	Téterchen
57668	57385	Teting-sur-Nied
57669	57450	Théding
57670	57380	Thicourt
57671	57580	Thimonville
57672	57100	Thionville
57673	57380	Thonville
57674	57590	Tincry
57675	57670	Torcheville
57676	57580	Tragny
57677	57300	Trémery
57678	57710	Tressange
57679	57385	Tritteling-Redlach
57680	57870	Troisfontaines
57681	57320	Tromborn
57682	57560	Turquestein-Blancrupt
57683	57270	Uckange
57684	57660	Vahl-Ebersing
57685	57670	Vahl-lès-Bénestroff
57686	57380	Vahl-lès-Faulquemont
57270	57260	Val-de-Bride
57267	57430	Le Val-de-Guéblange
57687	57340	Vallerange
57689	57970	Valmestroff
57690	57730	Valmont
57691	57220	Valmunster
57692	57340	Vannecourt
57693	57070	Vantoux
57694	57070	Vany
57695	57220	Varize-Vaudoncourt
57696	57880	Varsberg
57697	57560	Vasperviller
57698	57580	Vatimont
57700	57320	Vaudreching
57701	57130	Vaux
57702	57170	Vaxy
57703	57370	Veckersviller
57704	57920	Veckring
57705	57220	Velving
57706	57260	Vergaville
57707	57130	Vernéville
57708	57420	Verny
57709	57370	Vescheim
57711	57670	Vibersviller
57712	57630	Vic-sur-Seille
57713	57635	Vieux-Lixheim
57715	57420	Vigny
57716	57640	Vigy
57717	57340	Viller
57718	57530	Villers-Stoncourt
57719	57340	Villers-sur-Nied
57720	57550	Villing
57721	57370	Vilsberg
57723	57340	Virming
57724	57185	Vitry-sur-Orne
57725	57670	Vittersbourg
57726	57580	Vittoncourt
57727	57590	Viviers
57749	57320	Vœlfling-lès-Bouzonville
57728	57580	Voimhaut
57730	57220	Volmerange-lès-Boulay
57731	57330	Volmerange-les-Mines
57732	57720	Volmunster
57733	57940	Volstroff
57734	57560	Voyer
57736	57640	Vry
57737	57420	Vulmont
57738	57720	Waldhouse
57739	57320	Waldweistroff
57740	57480	Waldwisse
57741	57720	Walschbronn
57742	57870	Walscheid
57743	57370	Waltembourg
57745	57200	Wiesviller
57746	57430	Willerwald
57747	57635	Wintersbourg
57748	57905	Wittring
57750	57200	Wœlfling-lès-Sarreguemines
57751	57140	Woippy
57752	57915	Woustviller
57753	57170	Wuisse
57754	57630	Xanrey
57755	57590	Xocourt
57756	57830	Xouaxange
57757	57970	Yutz
57759	57340	Zarbeling
57760	57905	Zetting
57761	57370	Zilling
57762	57690	Zimming
57763	57260	Zommange
57764	57330	Zoufftgen
