= Gomelange =

- Commune
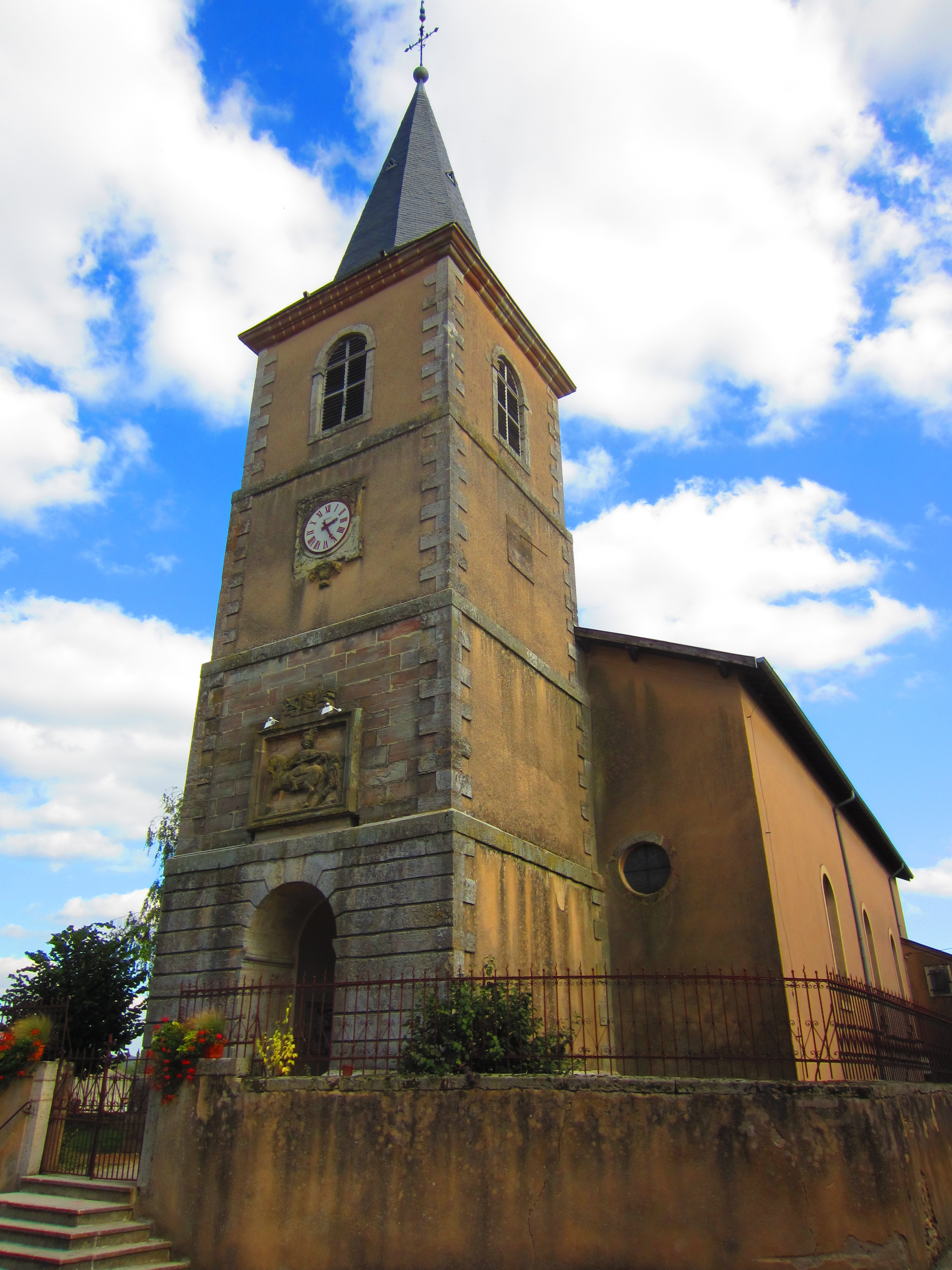
- The church in Gomelange

- Coat of arms
- Location of Gomelange
- Location within France Location within Grand Est
- Coordinates: 49°14′34″N 6°28′15″E
- Country: France
- Region: Grand Est
- Department: Moselle
- Arrondissement: Forbach-Boulay-Moselle
- Canton: Boulay-Moselle
- Intercommunality: CC Houve-Pays Boulageois

Government
  - Mayor (2020–2026): Christian Koch
- Area^{1}: 9.4 km^{2} (3.6 sq mi)
- Elevation: 210 m (690 ft)
- Highest elevation: 260 m (850 ft)
- Lowest elevation: 197 m (646 ft)
- Population (2023): 476
  - Density: 51/km^{2} (130/sq mi)
- Time zone: UTC+01:00 (CET)
  - Summer (DST): UTC+02:00 (CEST)
- INSEE/Postal code: 57252 /57220
- ^{1} French Land Register data, which excludes lakes, ponds, glaciers > 1 km^{2} (0.386 sq mi or 247 acres) and river estuaries.

Gomelange (French pronunciation: [ɡɔmlɑ̃ʒ]; German: Gelmingen) is a commune in the Moselle department in Grand Est in north-eastern France.

== See also ==
- Communes of the Moselle department
