= Canton of Boulay-Moselle =

Coordinates: 49.18°N 6.49°E

The canton of Boulay-Moselle is an administrative division of the Moselle department, northeastern France. Its borders were modified at the French canton reorganisation which came into effect in March 2015. Its seat is in Boulay-Moselle.

It consists of the following communes:

1. Bannay
2. Bettange
3. Bionville-sur-Nied
4. Bisten-en-Lorraine
5. Boulay-Moselle
6. Brouck
7. Condé-Northen
8. Coume
9. Creutzwald
10. Denting
11. Éblange
12. Gomelange
13. Guerting
14. Guinkirchen
15. Ham-sous-Varsberg
16. Helstroff
17. Hinckange
18. Mégange
19. Momerstroff
20. Narbéfontaine
21. Niedervisse
22. Obervisse
23. Ottonville
24. Piblange
25. Roupeldange
26. Téterchen
27. Valmunster
28. Varize-Vaudoncourt
29. Varsberg
30. Velving
31. Volmerange-lès-Boulay
