= Ham-sous-Varsberg =

- Commune
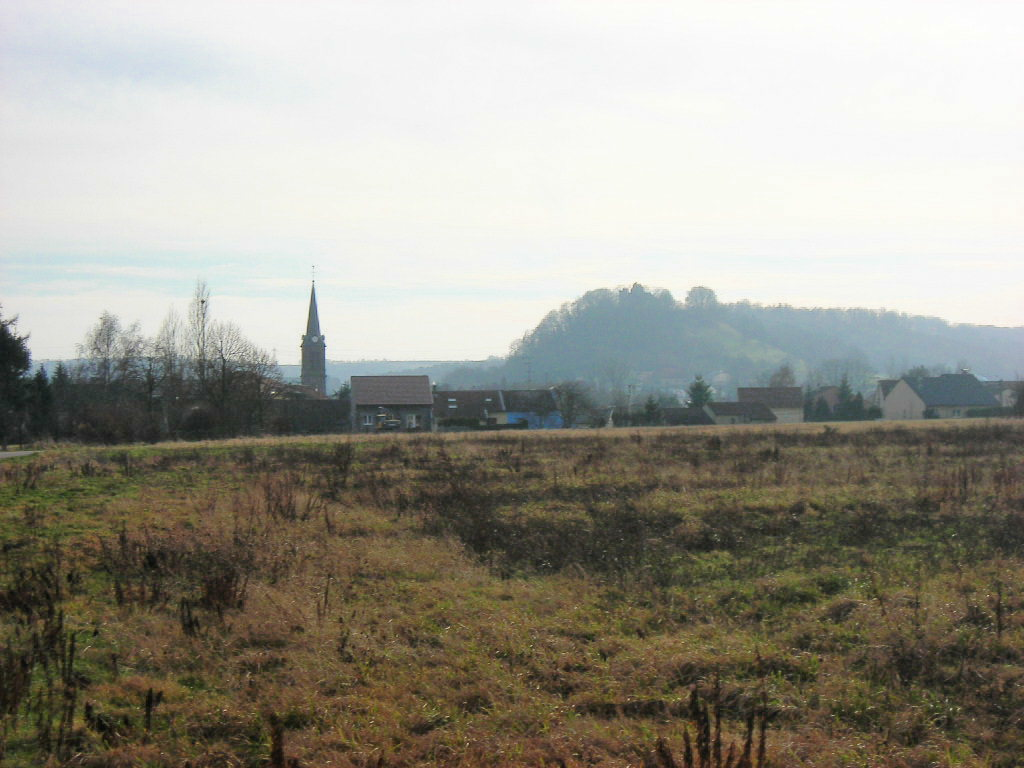
- St Lambert's Church and the castle

- Coat of arms
- Location of Ham-sous-Varsberg
- Location within France Location within Grand Est
- Coordinates: 49°10′54″N 6°38′54″E
- Country: France
- Region: Grand Est
- Department: Moselle
- Arrondissement: Forbach-Boulay-Moselle
- Canton: Boulay-Moselle
- Intercommunality: CC du Warndt

Government
  - Mayor (2020–2026): Edmond Bettinger
- Area^{1}: 6.53 km^{2} (2.52 sq mi)
- Elevation: 220 m (720 ft)
- Highest elevation: 332 m (1,089 ft)
- Lowest elevation: 213 m (699 ft)
- Population (2023): 2,888
  - Density: 442/km^{2} (1,150/sq mi)
- Time zone: UTC+01:00 (CET)
  - Summer (DST): UTC+02:00 (CEST)
- INSEE/Postal code: 57288 /57880
- ^{1} French Land Register data, which excludes lakes, ponds, glaciers > 1 km^{2} (0.386 sq mi or 247 acres) and river estuaries.

Ham-sous-Varsberg (French pronunciation: [am su vaʁsbɛʁɡ]; literally "Ham under Varsberg"; German: Hamm unter Varsberg) is a commune in the Moselle department in Grand Est in north-eastern France.

== Population ==
Historical population
Year	Pop.	±% p.a.
1968	2,303	—
1975	2,549	+1.46%
1982	2,762	+1.15%
1990	2,801	+0.18%
1999	2,707	−0.38%
2007	2,763	+0.26%
2012	2,798	+0.25%
2017	2,825	+0.19%
2023	2,888	+0.37%
Source: INSEE

== See also ==
- Communes of the Moselle department
