= Guinkirchen =

- Commune
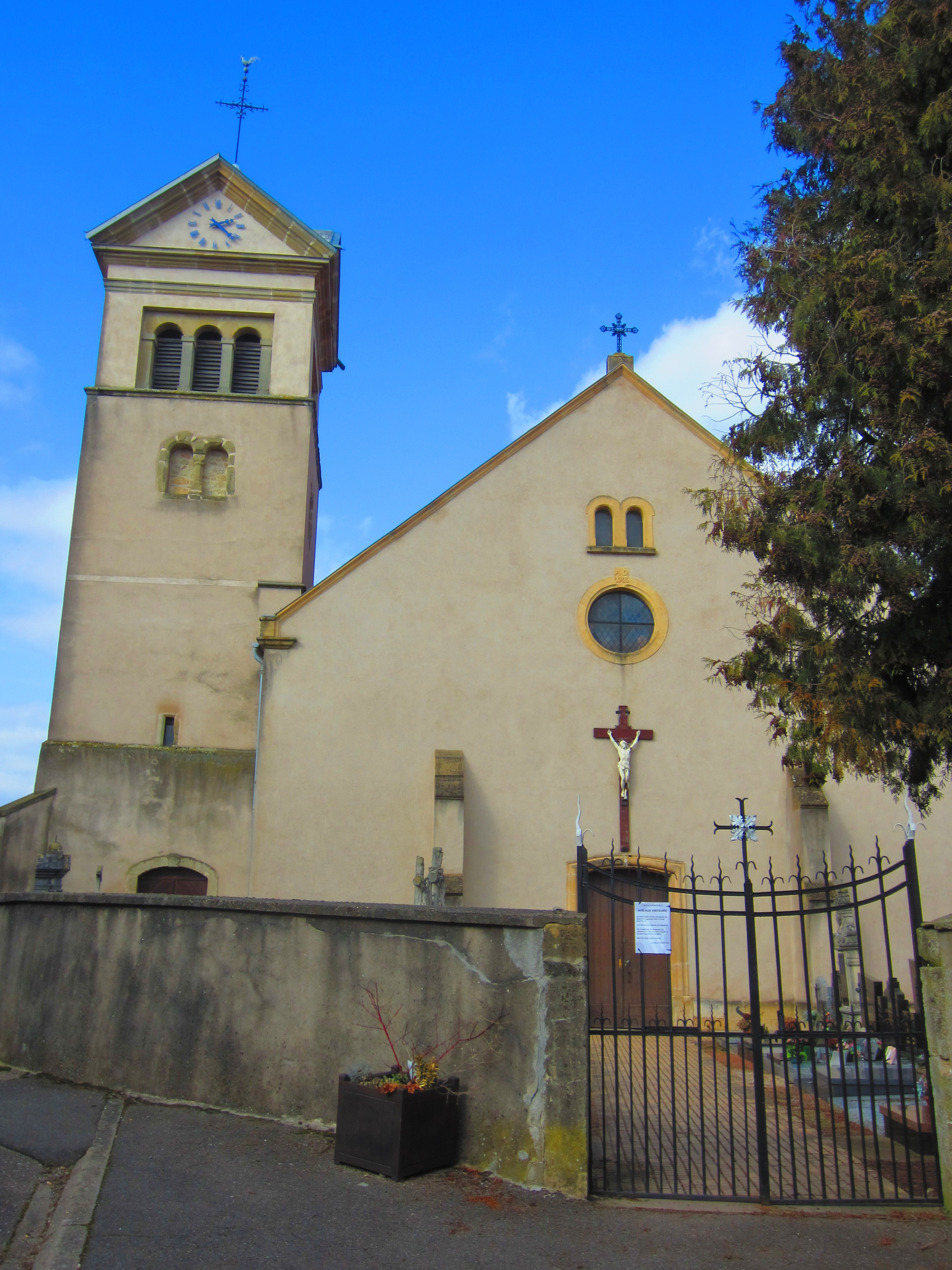
- The church in Guinkirchen

- Coat of arms
- Location of Guinkirchen
- Location within France Location within Grand Est
- Coordinates: 49°12′25″N 6°27′03″E
- Country: France
- Region: Grand Est
- Department: Moselle
- Arrondissement: Forbach-Boulay-Moselle
- Canton: Boulay-Moselle
- Intercommunality: CC Houve-Pays Boulageois

Government
  - Mayor (2020–2026): André Isler
- Area^{1}: 5.15 km^{2} (1.99 sq mi)
- Elevation: 210 m (690 ft)
- Highest elevation: 326 m (1,070 ft)
- Lowest elevation: 199 m (653 ft)
- Population (2023): 141
  - Density: 27.4/km^{2} (70.9/sq mi)
- Time zone: UTC+01:00 (CET)
  - Summer (DST): UTC+02:00 (CEST)
- INSEE/Postal code: 57277 /57220
- ^{1} French Land Register data, which excludes lakes, ponds, glaciers > 1 km^{2} (0.386 sq mi or 247 acres) and river estuaries.

Guinkirchen (French pronunciation: [ɡinkiʁʃən]; German: Gehnkirchen; Lorraine Franconian: Gängkerchin) is a commune in the Moselle department in Grand Est in north-eastern France.

== See also ==
- Communes of the Moselle department
