= Bettange =

- Commune
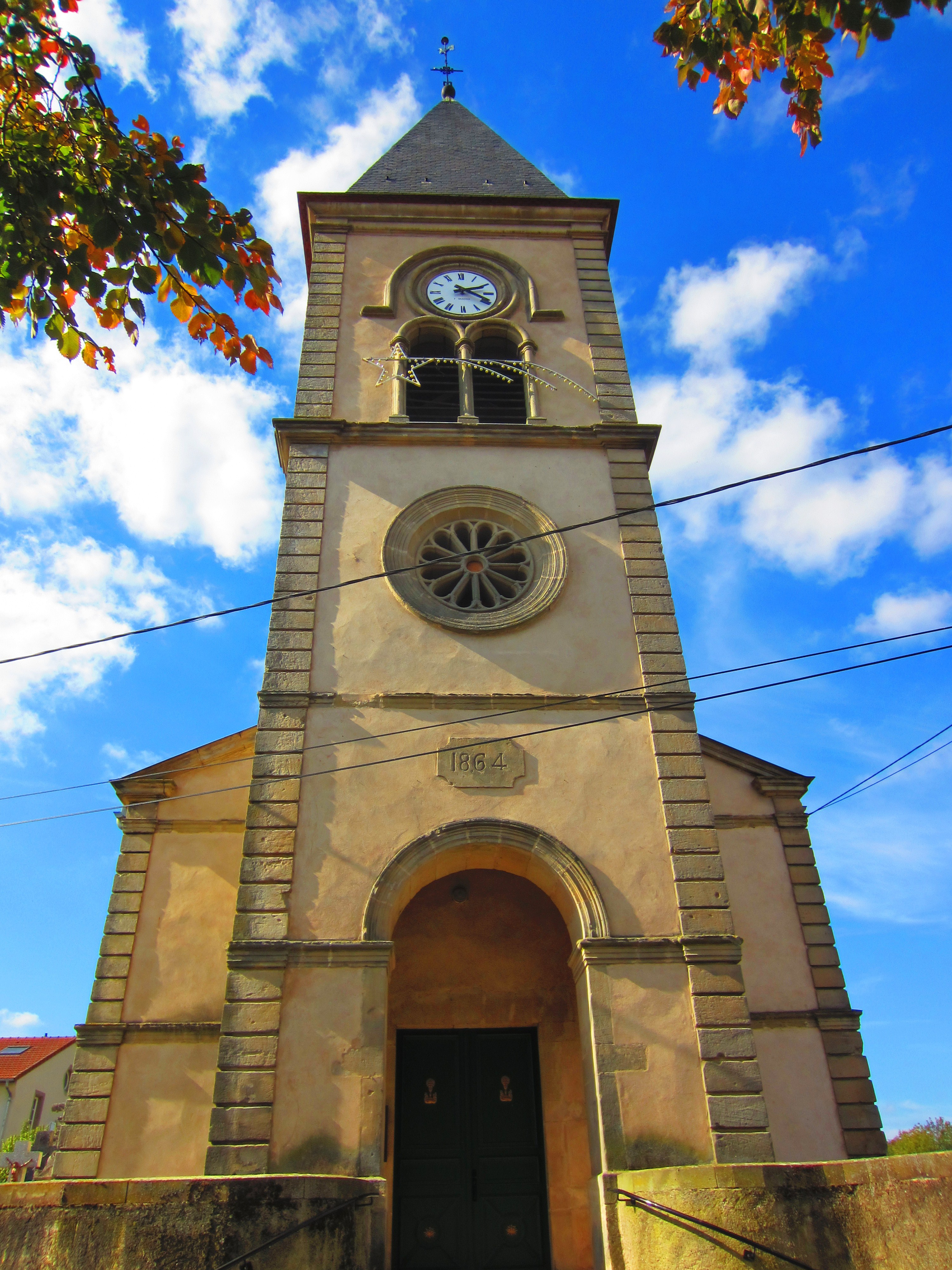
- The church in Bettange

- Coat of arms
- Location of Bettange
- Location within France Location within Grand Est
- Coordinates: 49°14′14″N 6°28′57″E
- Country: France
- Region: Grand Est
- Department: Moselle
- Arrondissement: Forbach-Boulay-Moselle
- Canton: Boulay-Moselle

Government
  - Mayor (2020–2026): Jean-Michel Oget
- Area^{1}: 3.73 km^{2} (1.44 sq mi)
- Elevation: 235 m (771 ft)
- Highest elevation: 260 m (850 ft)
- Lowest elevation: 197 m (646 ft)
- Population (2023): 242
  - Density: 64.9/km^{2} (168/sq mi)
- Time zone: UTC+01:00 (CET)
  - Summer (DST): UTC+02:00 (CEST)
- INSEE/Postal code: 57070 /57220
- ^{1} French Land Register data, which excludes lakes, ponds, glaciers > 1 km^{2} (0.386 sq mi or 247 acres) and river estuaries.

Bettange (French pronunciation: [bɛtɑ̃ʒ]; German: Bettingen) is a commune in the Moselle department in Grand Est in northeastern France.

== Population ==
Historical population
Year	Pop.	±% p.a.
1968	155	—
1975	172	+1.50%
1982	181	+0.73%
1990	185	+0.27%
1999	178	−0.43%
2007	210	+2.09%
2012	221	+1.03%
2017	242	+1.83%
2023	242	+0.00%
Source: INSEE

== See also ==
- Communes of the Moselle department
