= Piblange =

- Commune
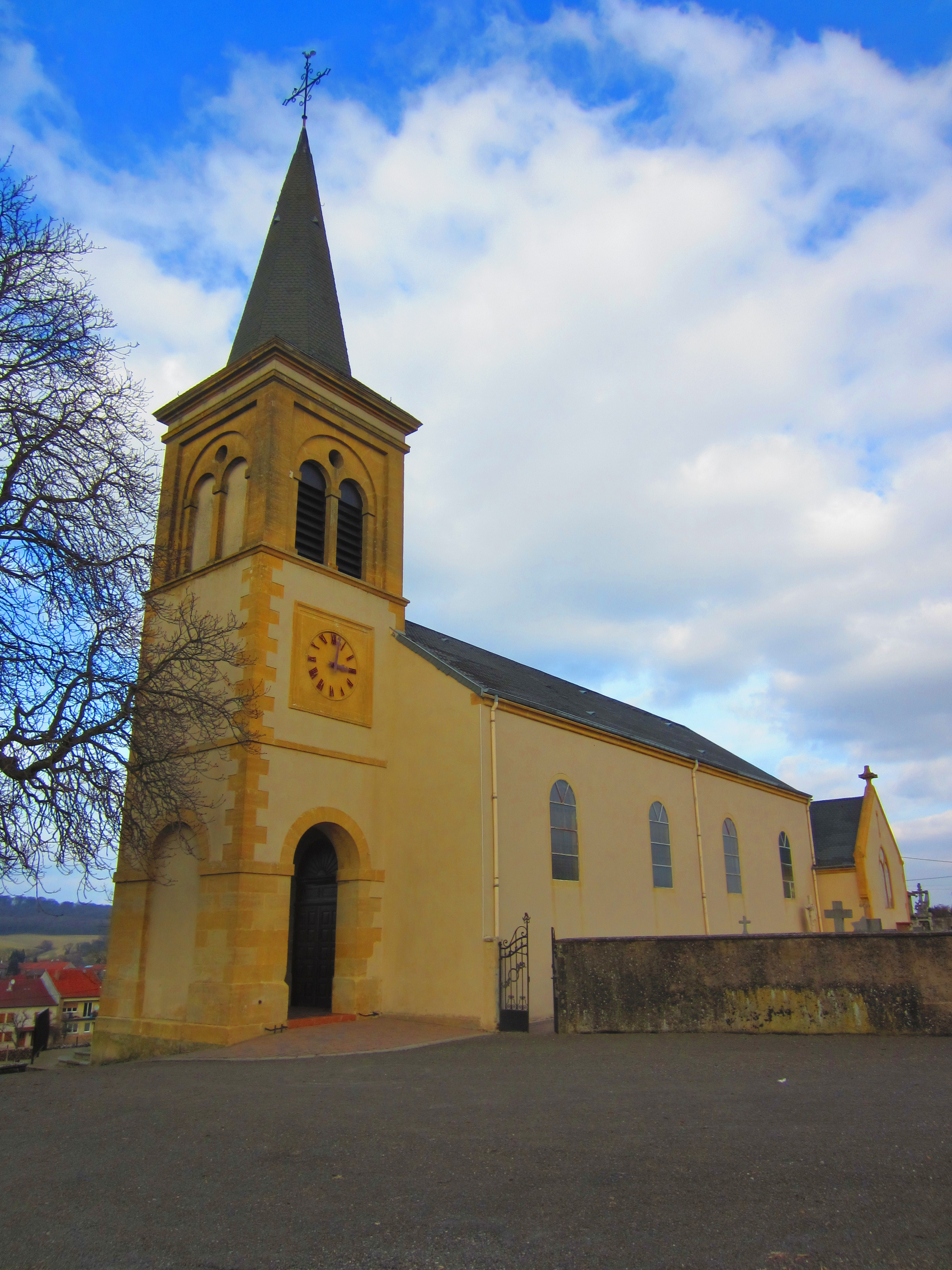
- The church in Drogny

- Coat of arms
- Location of Piblange
- Location within France Location within Grand Est
- Coordinates: 49°15′09″N 6°25′03″E
- Country: France
- Region: Grand Est
- Department: Moselle
- Arrondissement: Forbach-Boulay-Moselle
- Canton: Boulay-Moselle
- Intercommunality: CC Houve-Pays Boulageois

Government
  - Mayor (2021–2026): Thierry Ujma
- Area^{1}: 9.59 km^{2} (3.70 sq mi)
- Elevation: 235 m (771 ft)
- Highest elevation: 317 m (1,040 ft)
- Lowest elevation: 213 m (699 ft)
- Population (2023): 943
  - Density: 98.3/km^{2} (255/sq mi)
- Time zone: UTC+01:00 (CET)
  - Summer (DST): UTC+02:00 (CEST)
- INSEE/Postal code: 57542 /57220
- ^{1} French Land Register data, which excludes lakes, ponds, glaciers > 1 km^{2} (0.386 sq mi or 247 acres) and river estuaries.

Piblange (French pronunciation: [piblɑ̃ʒ]; German: Pieblingen; Lorraine Franconian Piwléngen) is a commune in the Moselle department in Grand Est in north-eastern France. Localities of the commune: Saint-Bernard, Bockange, Drogny (lf: Drechéngen).

== See also ==
- Communes of the Moselle department
