= Vœlfling-lès-Bouzonville =

Voelfling-lès-Bouzonville
- Commune
- Coat of arms
- Location of Voelfling-lès-Bouzonville
- Location within France Location within Grand Est
- Coordinates: 49°17′35″N 6°36′29″E
- Country: France
- Region: Grand Est
- Department: Moselle
- Arrondissement: Forbach-Boulay-Moselle
- Canton: Bouzonville
- Intercommunality: Houve-Pays Boulageois

Government
  - Mayor (2020–2026): Alain Dauendorffer
- Area^{1}: 2.9 km^{2} (1.1 sq mi)
- Elevation: 260 m (850 ft)
- Highest elevation: 322 m (1,056 ft)
- Lowest elevation: 237 m (778 ft)
- Population (2023): 170
  - Density: 59/km^{2} (150/sq mi)
- Time zone: UTC+01:00 (CET)
  - Summer (DST): UTC+02:00 (CEST)
- INSEE/Postal code: 57749 /57320
- ^{1} French Land Register data, which excludes lakes, ponds, glaciers > 1 km^{2} (0.386 sq mi or 247 acres) and river estuaries.

Vœlfling-lès-Bouzonville (French pronunciation: [vœlflɛ̃ lɛ buzɔ̃vil], literally Vœlfling near Bouzonville; German: Wölflingen bei Busendorf) is a commune in the Moselle department in Grand Est in north-eastern France.

== Population ==
Historical population
Year	Pop.	±% p.a.
1968	138	—
1975	145	+0.71%
1982	175	+2.72%
1990	203	+1.87%
1999	197	−0.33%
2007	196	−0.06%
2012	170	−2.81%
2017	155	−1.83%
2023	170	+1.55%
Source: INSEE

== See also ==
- Communes of the Moselle department
