= Velving =

- Commune
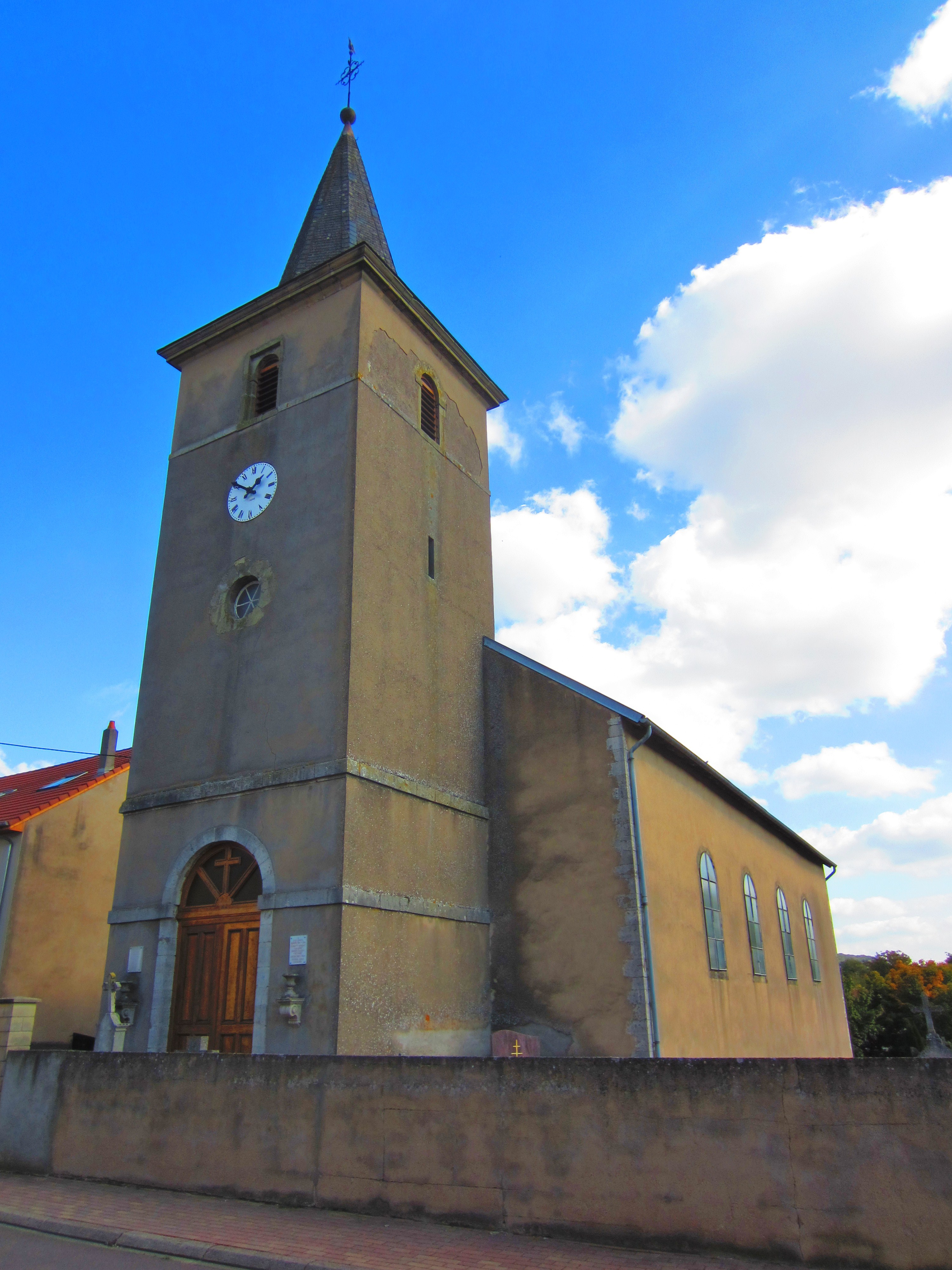
- The church in Velving

- Coat of arms
- Location of Velving
- Location within France Location within Grand Est
- Coordinates: 49°14′29″N 6°32′02″E
- Country: France
- Region: Grand Est
- Department: Moselle
- Arrondissement: Forbach-Boulay-Moselle
- Canton: Boulay-Moselle
- Intercommunality: CC Houve-Pays Boulageois

Government
  - Mayor (2020–2026): Michel Arnould
- Area^{1}: 4.71 km^{2} (1.82 sq mi)
- Elevation: 250 m (820 ft)
- Highest elevation: 320 m (1,050 ft)
- Lowest elevation: 217 m (712 ft)
- Population (2023): 199
  - Density: 42.3/km^{2} (109/sq mi)
- Time zone: UTC+01:00 (CET)
  - Summer (DST): UTC+02:00 (CEST)
- INSEE/Postal code: 57705 /57220
- ^{1} French Land Register data, which excludes lakes, ponds, glaciers > 1 km^{2} (0.386 sq mi or 247 acres) and river estuaries.

Velving (French pronunciation: [vɛlvɛ̃]; German: Welwingen) is a commune in the Moselle department in Grand Est in north-eastern France.

== See also ==
- Communes of the Moselle department
