= Brouck =

- Commune
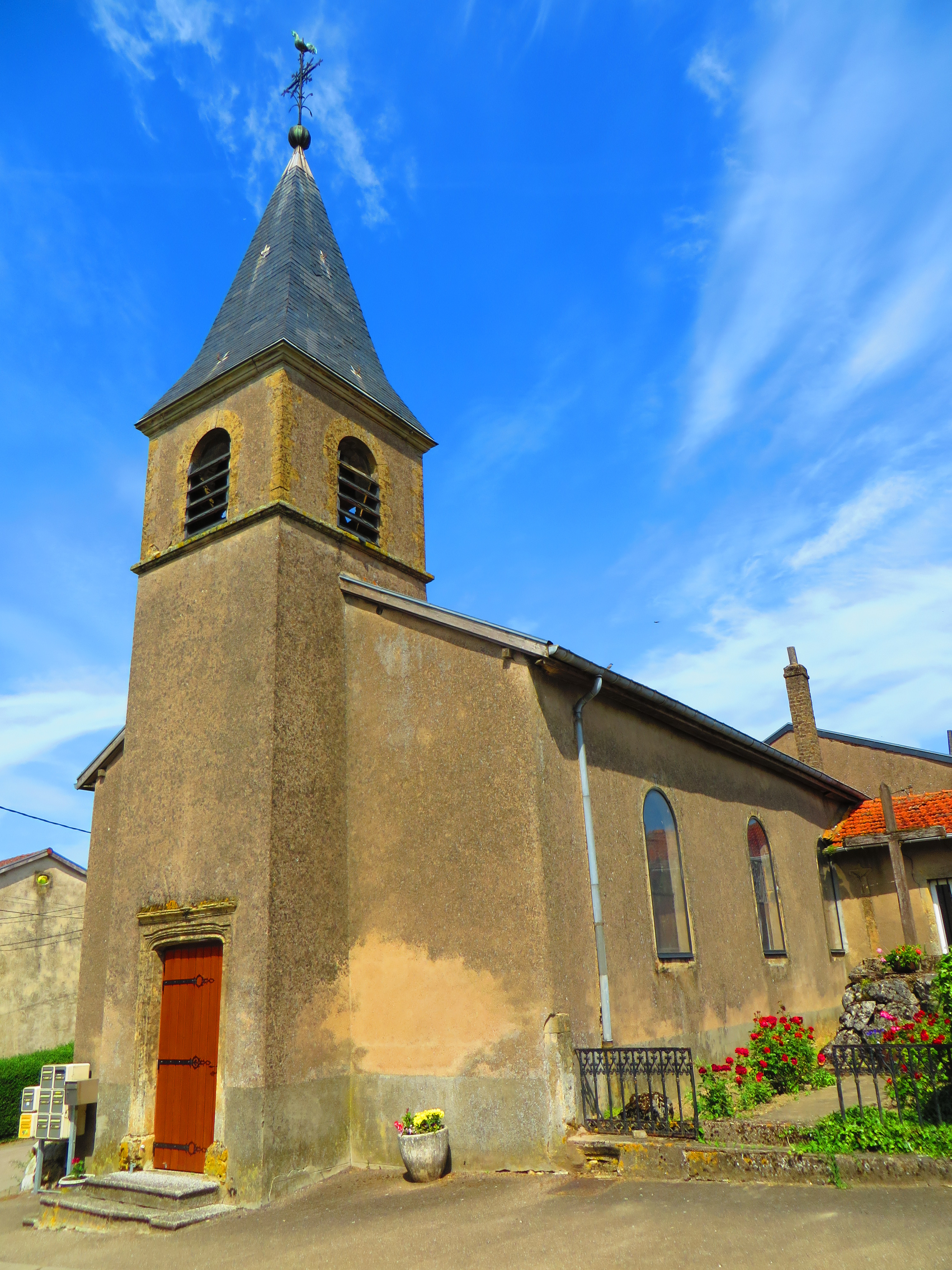
- The church in Brouck

- Coat of arms
- Location of Brouck
- Location within France Location within Grand Est
- Coordinates: 49°07′50″N 6°30′23″E
- Country: France
- Region: Grand Est
- Department: Moselle
- Arrondissement: Forbach-Boulay-Moselle
- Canton: Boulay-Moselle
- Intercommunality: Houve-Pays Boulageois

Government
  - Mayor (2020–2026): Marc Lucien Schneider
- Area^{1}: 2.98 km^{2} (1.15 sq mi)
- Elevation: 330 m (1,080 ft)
- Highest elevation: 357 m (1,171 ft)
- Lowest elevation: 283 m (928 ft)
- Population (2023): 80
  - Density: 27/km^{2} (70/sq mi)
- Time zone: UTC+01:00 (CET)
  - Summer (DST): UTC+02:00 (CEST)
- INSEE/Postal code: 57112 /57220
- ^{1} French Land Register data, which excludes lakes, ponds, glaciers > 1 km^{2} (0.386 sq mi or 247 acres) and river estuaries.

Brouck (French pronunciation: [bʁuk]; German: Bruchen) is a commune in the Moselle department in Grand Est in northeastern France.

== Population ==
Historical population
Year	Pop.	±% p.a.
1968	52	—
1975	59	+1.82%
1982	59	+0.00%
1990	78	+3.55%
1999	66	−1.84%
2007	72	+1.09%
2012	91	+4.80%
2017	84	−1.59%
2023	80	−0.81%
Source: INSEE

== See also ==
- Communes of the Moselle department
