= Varize-Vaudoncourt =

- Commune
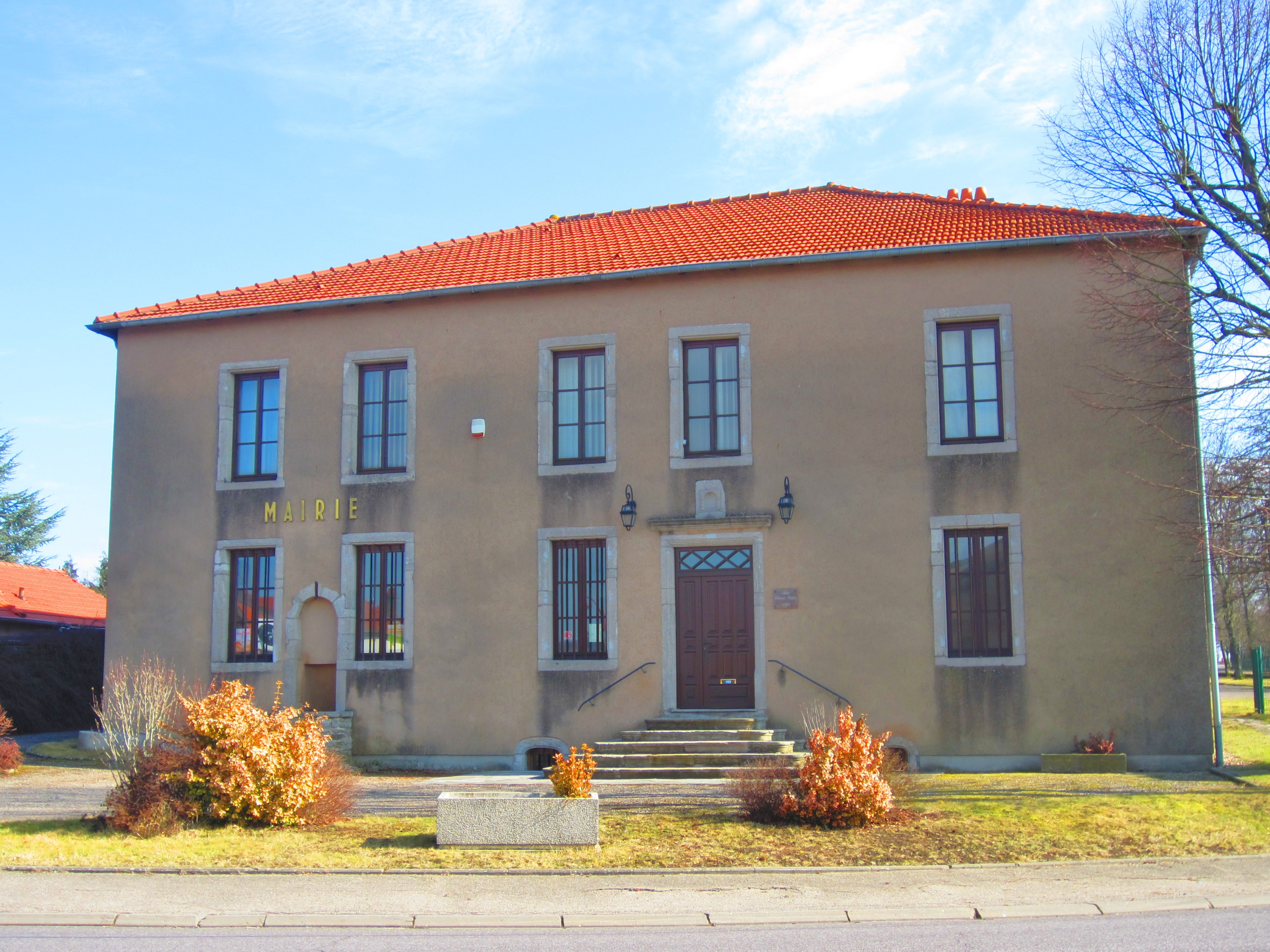
- The town hall in Varize

- Coat of arms
- Location of Varize-Vaudoncourt
- Location within France Location within Grand Est
- Coordinates: 49°08′08″N 6°27′32″E
- Country: France
- Region: Grand Est
- Department: Moselle
- Arrondissement: Forbach-Boulay-Moselle
- Canton: Boulay-Moselle
- Intercommunality: CC Houve-Pays Boulageois

Government
  - Mayor (2020–2026): Franck Rogovitz
- Area^{1}: 13.87 km^{2} (5.36 sq mi)
- Elevation: 225 m (738 ft)
- Highest elevation: 347 m (1,138 ft)
- Lowest elevation: 205 m (673 ft)
- Population (2023): 508
  - Density: 36.6/km^{2} (94.9/sq mi)
- Time zone: UTC+01:00 (CET)
  - Summer (DST): UTC+02:00 (CEST)
- INSEE/Postal code: 57695 /57220
- ^{1} French Land Register data, which excludes lakes, ponds, glaciers > 1 km^{2} (0.386 sq mi or 247 acres) and river estuaries.

Varize-Vaudoncourt (French pronunciation: [vaʁiz vodɔ̃kuʁ]; before 2015: Varize, German: Waibelskirchen) is a commune in the Moselle department in Grand Est in north-eastern France.

== See also ==
- Communes of the Moselle department
