= Momerstroff =

- Commune
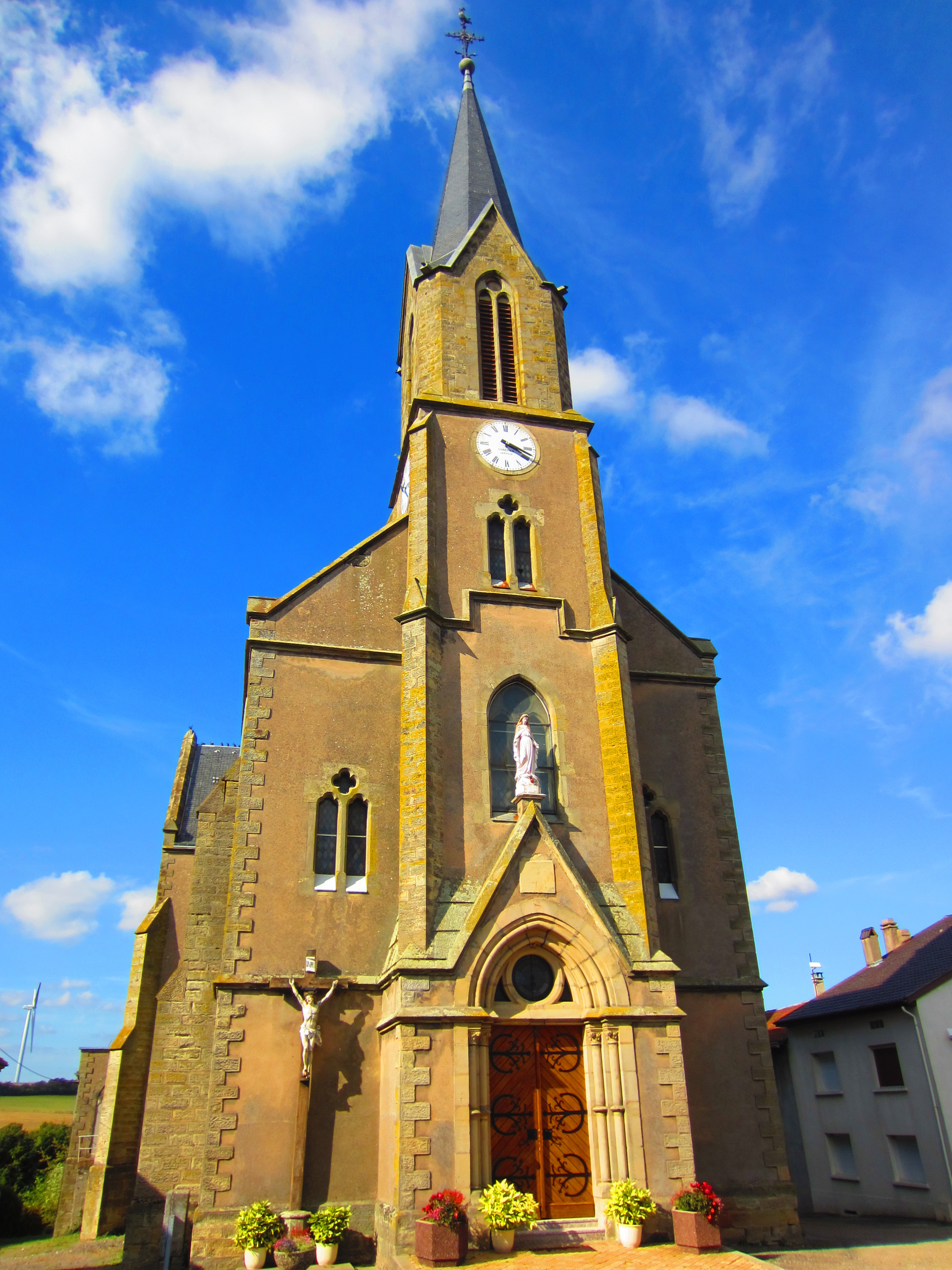
- The church in Momerstroff

- Coat of arms
- Location of Momerstroff
- Location within France Location within Grand Est
- Coordinates: 49°09′51″N 6°32′05″E
- Country: France
- Region: Grand Est
- Department: Moselle
- Arrondissement: Forbach-Boulay-Moselle
- Canton: Boulay-Moselle
- Intercommunality: CC Houve-Pays Boulageois

Government
  - Mayor (2020–2026): Bernard Colbus
- Area^{1}: 6.17 km^{2} (2.38 sq mi)
- Elevation: 310 m (1,020 ft)
- Highest elevation: 372 m (1,220 ft)
- Lowest elevation: 275 m (902 ft)
- Population (2023): 298
  - Density: 48.3/km^{2} (125/sq mi)
- Time zone: UTC+01:00 (CET)
  - Summer (DST): UTC+02:00 (CEST)
- INSEE/Postal code: 57471 /57220
- ^{1} French Land Register data, which excludes lakes, ponds, glaciers > 1 km^{2} (0.386 sq mi or 247 acres) and river estuaries.

Momerstroff (French pronunciation: [mɔmɛʁstʁɔf]; German: Momersdorf) is a commune in the Moselle department in Grand Est in north-eastern France.

== See also ==
- Communes of the Moselle department
