= Helstroff =

- Commune
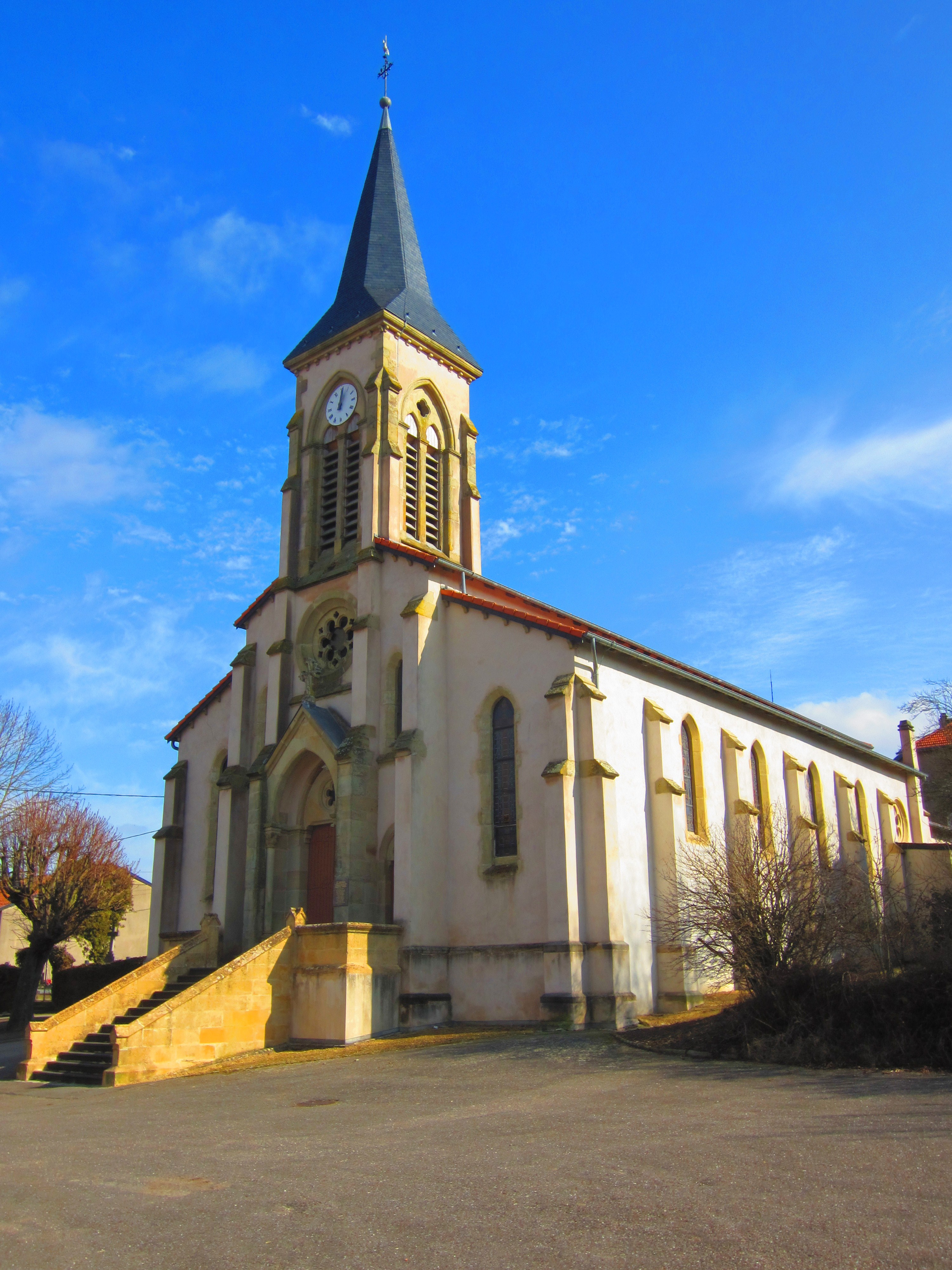
- The church in Helstroff

- Coat of arms
- Location of Helstroff
- Location within France Location within Grand Est
- Coordinates: 49°09′12″N 6°28′32″E
- Country: France
- Region: Grand Est
- Department: Moselle
- Arrondissement: Forbach-Boulay-Moselle
- Canton: Boulay-Moselle
- Intercommunality: CC Houve-Pays Boulageois

Government
  - Mayor (2020–2026): Christian Laurentz
- Area^{1}: 7.91 km^{2} (3.05 sq mi)
- Elevation: 325 m (1,066 ft)
- Highest elevation: 359 m (1,178 ft)
- Lowest elevation: 215 m (705 ft)
- Population (2023): 481
  - Density: 60.8/km^{2} (157/sq mi)
- Time zone: UTC+01:00 (CET)
  - Summer (DST): UTC+02:00 (CEST)
- INSEE/Postal code: 57312 /57220
- ^{1} French Land Register data, which excludes lakes, ponds, glaciers > 1 km^{2} (0.386 sq mi or 247 acres) and river estuaries.

Helstroff (French pronunciation: [ɛlstʁɔf]; German: Helsdorf; Lorraine Franconian: Helschtroff) is a commune in the Moselle department in Grand Est in north-eastern France.

The locality of Macker (a.k.a. Macher) is incorporated in the commune since 1811.

== See also ==
- Communes of the Moselle department
