= Téterchen =

- Commune
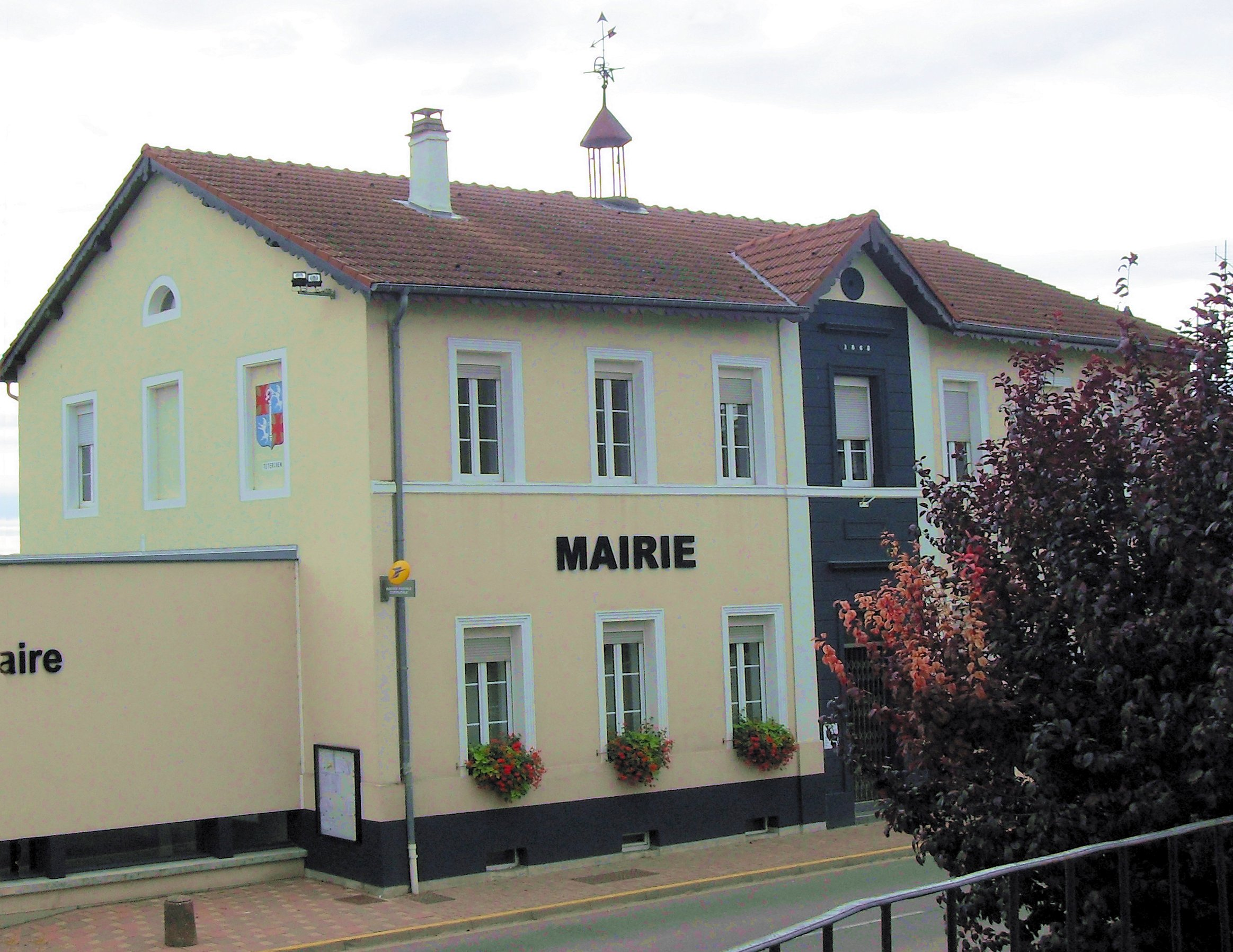
- The town hall in Téterchen

- Coat of arms
- Location of Téterchen
- Location within France Location within Grand Est
- Coordinates: 49°13′58″N 6°33′39″E
- Country: France
- Region: Grand Est
- Department: Moselle
- Arrondissement: Forbach-Boulay-Moselle
- Canton: Boulay-Moselle
- Intercommunality: CC Houve-Pays Boulageois

Government
  - Mayor (2020–2026): Emmanuel Michel
- Area^{1}: 8.75 km^{2} (3.38 sq mi)
- Elevation: 250 m (820 ft)
- Highest elevation: 372 m (1,220 ft)
- Lowest elevation: 220 m (720 ft)
- Population (2023): 757
  - Density: 86.5/km^{2} (224/sq mi)
- Time zone: UTC+01:00 (CET)
  - Summer (DST): UTC+02:00 (CEST)
- INSEE/Postal code: 57667 /57220
- ^{1} French Land Register data, which excludes lakes, ponds, glaciers > 1 km^{2} (0.386 sq mi or 247 acres) and river estuaries.

Téterchen (German: Teterchen) is a commune in the Moselle department in Grand Est in north-eastern France.

== See also ==
- Communes of the Moselle department
