= Mégange =

- Commune
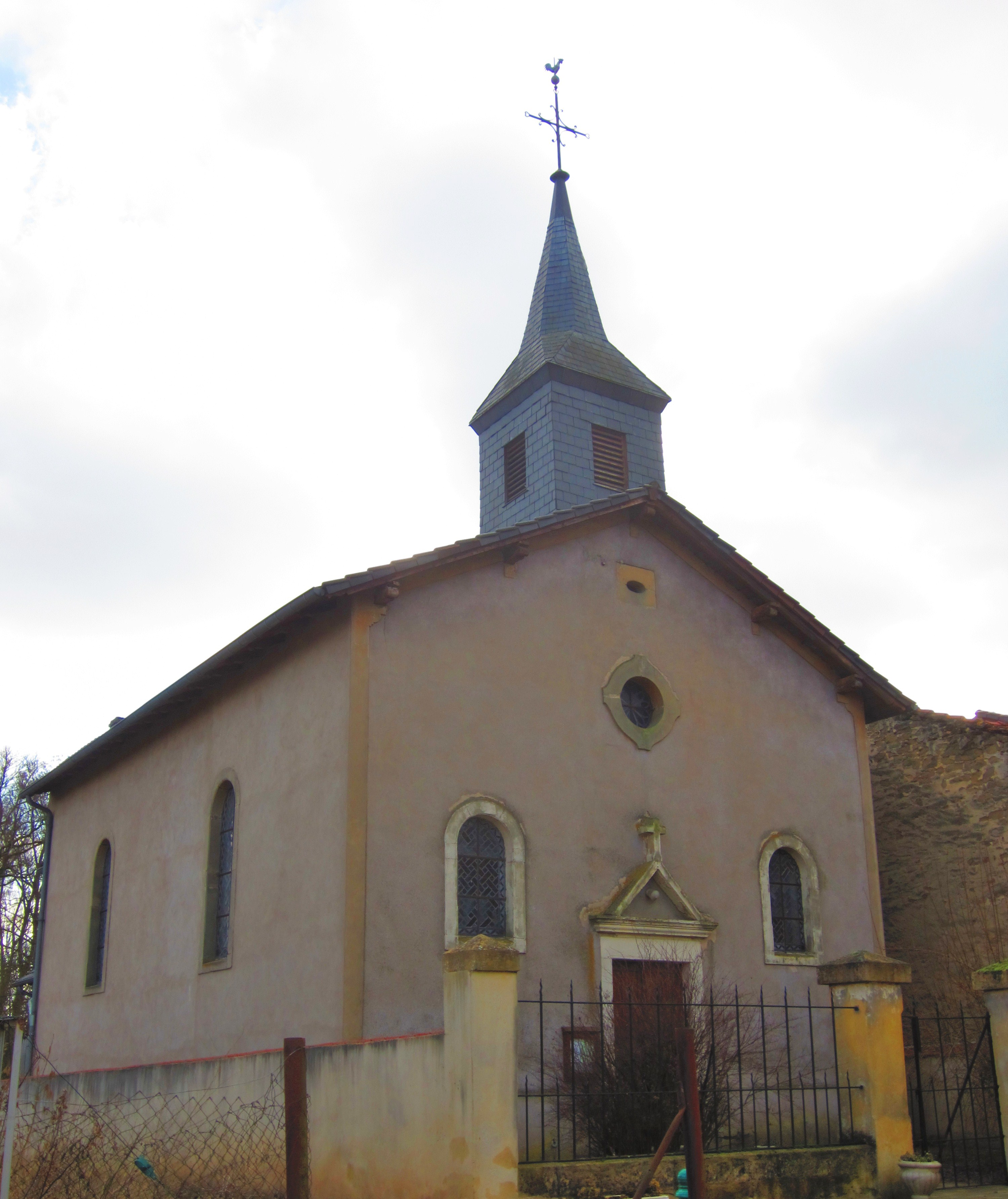
- The chapel in Mégange

- Coat of arms
- Location of Mégange
- Location within France Location within Grand Est
- Coordinates: 49°13′08″N 6°26′10″E
- Country: France
- Region: Grand Est
- Department: Moselle
- Arrondissement: Forbach-Boulay-Moselle
- Canton: Boulay-Moselle
- Intercommunality: CC Houve-Pays Boulageois

Government
  - Mayor (2020–2026): Antonio Mongelli
- Area^{1}: 4.96 km^{2} (1.92 sq mi)
- Elevation: 200 m (660 ft)
- Highest elevation: 330 m (1,080 ft)
- Lowest elevation: 205 m (673 ft)
- Population (2023): 138
  - Density: 27.8/km^{2} (72.1/sq mi)
- Time zone: UTC+01:00 (CET)
  - Summer (DST): UTC+02:00 (CEST)
- INSEE/Postal code: 57455 /57220
- ^{1} French Land Register data, which excludes lakes, ponds, glaciers > 1 km^{2} (0.386 sq mi or 247 acres) and river estuaries.

Mégange (French pronunciation: [meɡɑ̃ʒ]; German: Mengen; Lorraine Franconian Mengen/Mägen) is a commune in the Moselle department in Grand Est in north-eastern France.

== See also ==
- Communes of the Moselle department
