= Coume =

- Commune
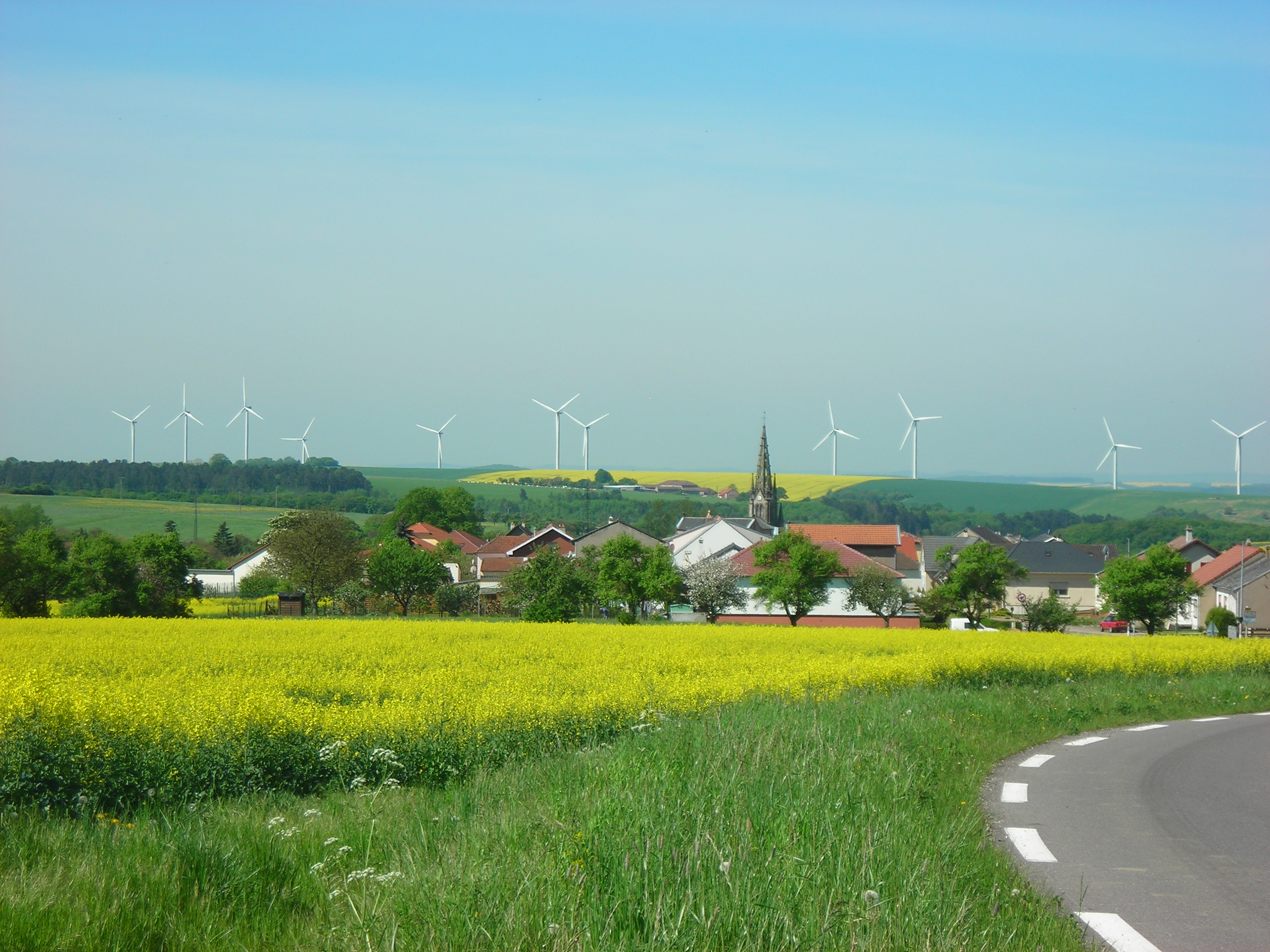
- A general view of Coume

- Coat of arms
- Location of Coume
- Location within France Location within Grand Est
- Coordinates: 49°11′56″N 6°34′23″E
- Country: France
- Region: Grand Est
- Department: Moselle
- Arrondissement: Forbach-Boulay-Moselle
- Canton: Boulay-Moselle
- Intercommunality: CC Houve-Pays Boulageois

Government
  - Mayor (2020–2026): Jean-Michel Brun
- Area^{1}: 14.9 km^{2} (5.8 sq mi)
- Elevation: 350 m (1,150 ft)
- Highest elevation: 395 m (1,296 ft)
- Lowest elevation: 224 m (735 ft)
- Population (2023): 593
  - Density: 39.8/km^{2} (103/sq mi)
- Time zone: UTC+01:00 (CET)
  - Summer (DST): UTC+02:00 (CEST)
- INSEE/Postal code: 57154 /57220
- ^{1} French Land Register data, which excludes lakes, ponds, glaciers > 1 km^{2} (0.386 sq mi or 247 acres) and river estuaries.

Coume (French pronunciation: [kum]; German: Kuhmen; Lorraine Franconian: Kum) is a commune in the Moselle department in Grand Est in north-eastern France.

== See also ==
- Communes of the Moselle department
