= Éblange =

- Commune
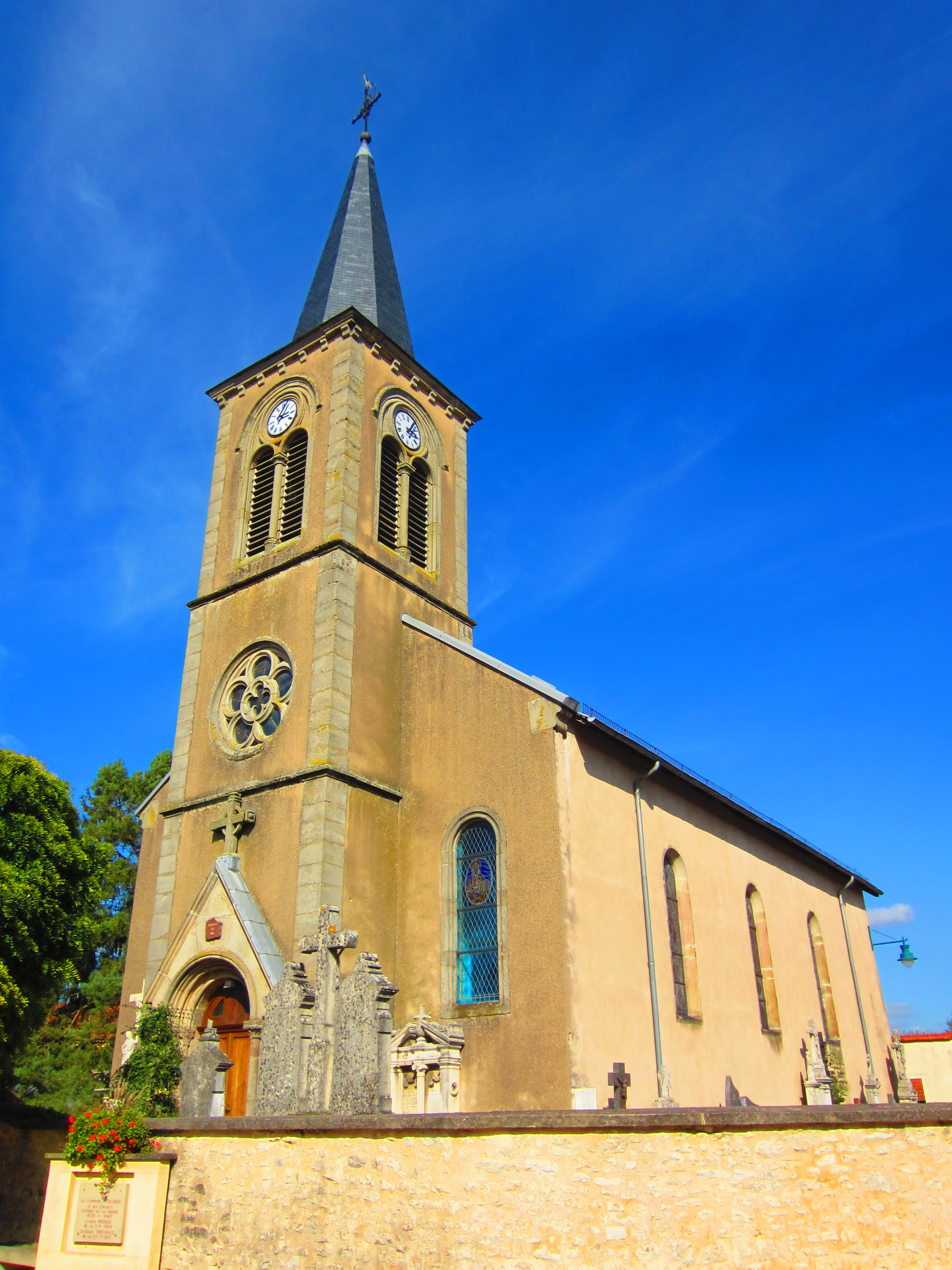
- St. Wendelin's Church

- Coat of arms
- Location of Éblange
- Location within France Location within Grand Est
- Coordinates: 49°13′27″N 6°28′58″E
- Country: France
- Region: Grand Est
- Department: Moselle
- Arrondissement: Forbach-Boulay-Moselle
- Canton: Boulay-Moselle
- Intercommunality: Houve-Pays Boulageois

Government
  - Mayor (2020–2026): Edouard Hombourger
- Area^{1}: 3.32 km^{2} (1.28 sq mi)
- Elevation: 202 m (663 ft)
- Highest elevation: 295 m (968 ft)
- Lowest elevation: 198 m (650 ft)
- Population (2023): 360
  - Density: 110/km^{2} (280/sq mi)
- Time zone: UTC+01:00 (CET)
  - Summer (DST): UTC+02:00 (CEST)
- INSEE/Postal code: 57187 /57220
- ^{1} French Land Register data, which excludes lakes, ponds, glaciers > 1 km^{2} (0.386 sq mi or 247 acres) and river estuaries.

Éblange (French pronunciation: [eblɑ̃ʒ]; German: Eblingen) is a commune in the Moselle department in Grand Est in north-eastern France.

== Population ==
Historical population
Year	Pop.	±% p.a.
1968	143	—
1975	122	−2.24%
1982	217	+8.57%
1990	251	+1.84%
1999	246	−0.22%
2007	280	+1.63%
2012	386	+6.63%
2017	374	−0.63%
2023	360	−0.63%
Source: INSEE

== See also ==
- Communes of the Moselle department
