= Denting =

- Commune
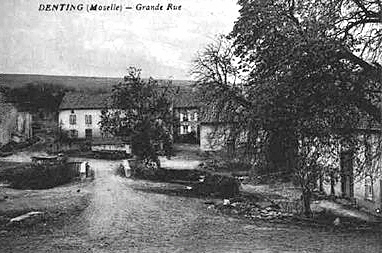
- The Grande-Rue of the village at the start of the 20th century

- Coat of arms
- Location of Denting
- Location within France Location within Grand Est
- Coordinates: 49°11′41″N 6°32′06″E
- Country: France
- Region: Grand Est
- Department: Moselle
- Arrondissement: Forbach-Boulay-Moselle
- Canton: Boulay-Moselle
- Intercommunality: CC Houve-Pays Boulageois

Government
  - Mayor (2020–2026): François Bir
- Area^{1}: 9.67 km^{2} (3.73 sq mi)
- Elevation: 121 m (397 ft)
- Highest elevation: 384 m (1,260 ft)
- Lowest elevation: 230 m (750 ft)
- Population (2023): 268
  - Density: 27.7/km^{2} (71.8/sq mi)
- Time zone: UTC+01:00 (CET)
  - Summer (DST): UTC+02:00 (CEST)
- INSEE/Postal code: 57172 /57220
- ^{1} French Land Register data, which excludes lakes, ponds, glaciers > 1 km^{2} (0.386 sq mi or 247 acres) and river estuaries.

Denting (French pronunciation: [dɑ̃tɛ̃]; German: Dentingen) is a commune in the Moselle department in Grand Est in north-eastern France.

== See also ==
- Communes of the Moselle department
