= Bionville-sur-Nied =

- Commune
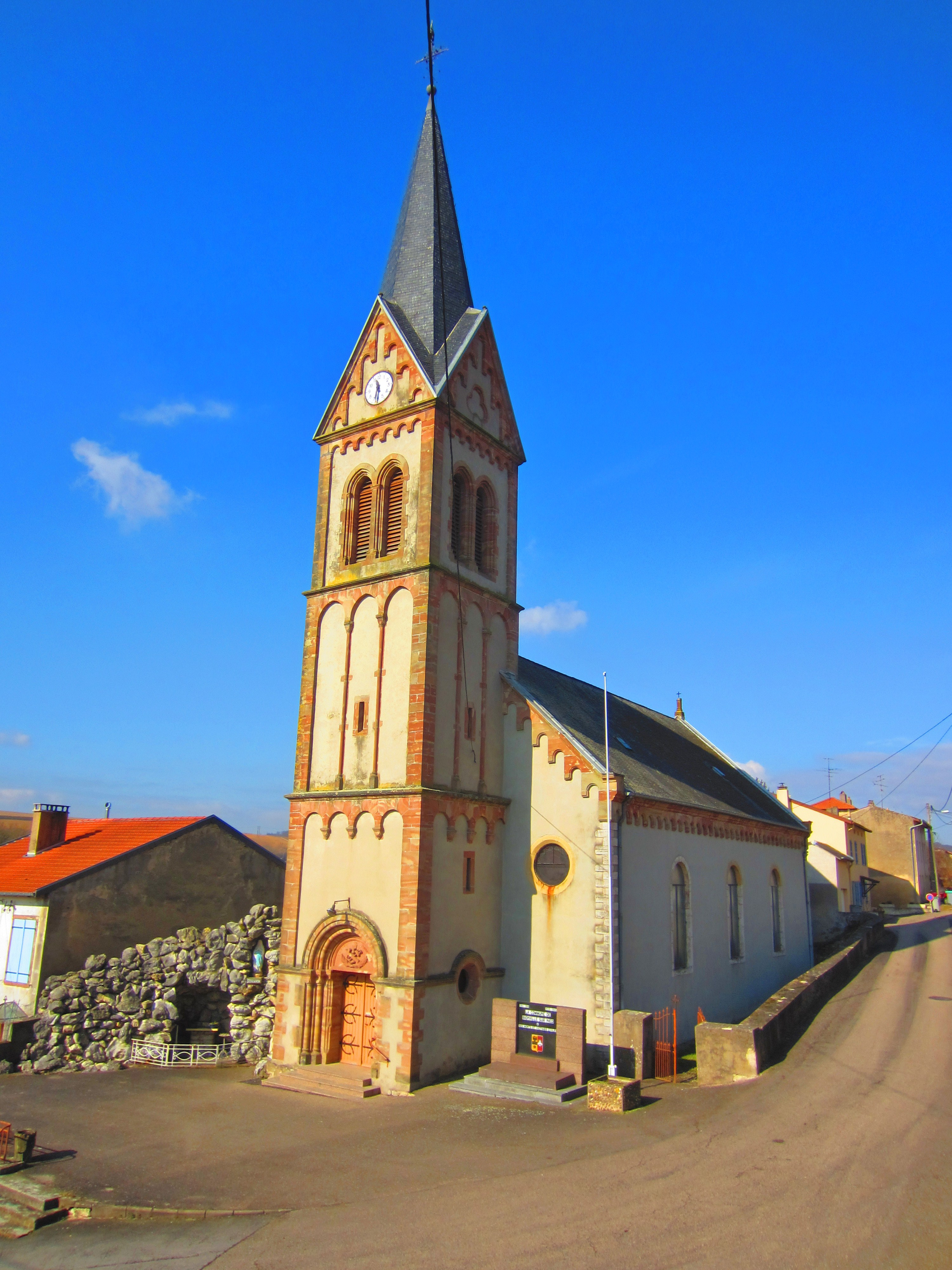
- The church in Bionville-sur-Nied

- Coat of arms
- Location of Bionville-sur-Nied
- Location within France Location within Grand Est
- Coordinates: 49°06′20″N 6°28′52″E
- Country: France
- Region: Grand Est
- Department: Moselle
- Arrondissement: Forbach-Boulay-Moselle
- Canton: Boulay-Moselle

Government
  - Mayor (2020–2026): Gérard Bazin
- Area^{1}: 8.43 km^{2} (3.25 sq mi)
- Elevation: 216 m (709 ft)
- Highest elevation: 329 m (1,079 ft)
- Lowest elevation: 212 m (696 ft)
- Population (2023): 393
  - Density: 46.6/km^{2} (121/sq mi)
- Time zone: UTC+01:00 (CET)
  - Summer (DST): UTC+02:00 (CEST)
- INSEE/Postal code: 57085 /57220
- ^{1} French Land Register data, which excludes lakes, ponds, glaciers > 1 km^{2} (0.386 sq mi or 247 acres) and river estuaries.

Bionville-sur-Nied (French pronunciation: [bjɔ̃vil syʁ nje], literally Bionville on Nied; Lorraine Franconian Bingen) is a commune in the Moselle department in Grand Est in northeastern France. The locality of Morlange (German: Morlingen) is incorporated in the commune since 1812.

== Population ==
Historical population
Year	Pop.	±% p.a.
1968	292	—
1975	284	−0.40%
1982	336	+2.43%
1990	375	+1.38%
1999	363	−0.36%
2007	364	+0.03%
2012	373	+0.49%
2017	381	+0.43%
2023	393	+0.52%
Source: INSEE

== See also ==
- Communes of the Moselle department
