= Narbéfontaine =

- Commune
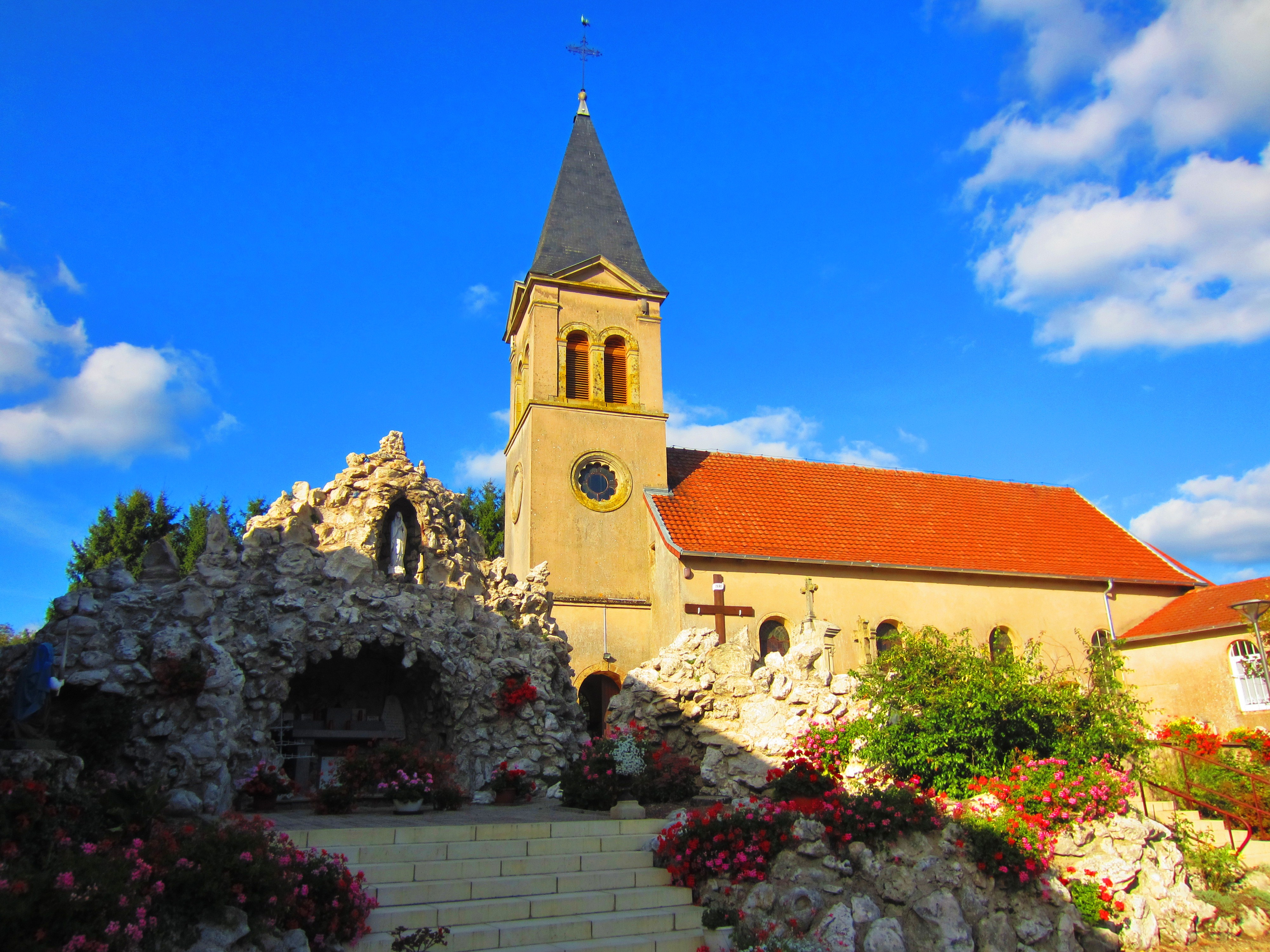
- The church in Narbéfontaine

- Coat of arms
- Location of Narbéfontaine
- Location within France Location within Grand Est
- Coordinates: 49°08′34″N 6°32′50″E
- Country: France
- Region: Grand Est
- Department: Moselle
- Arrondissement: Forbach-Boulay-Moselle
- Canton: Boulay-Moselle

Government
  - Mayor (2020–2026): Christiane Muller
- Area^{1}: 3.58 km^{2} (1.38 sq mi)
- Elevation: 360 m (1,180 ft)
- Highest elevation: 376 m (1,234 ft)
- Lowest elevation: 284 m (932 ft)
- Population (2023): 115
  - Density: 32.1/km^{2} (83.2/sq mi)
- Time zone: UTC+01:00 (CET)
  - Summer (DST): UTC+02:00 (CEST)
- INSEE/Postal code: 57495 /57220
- ^{1} French Land Register data, which excludes lakes, ponds, glaciers > 1 km^{2} (0.386 sq mi or 247 acres) and river estuaries.

Narbéfontaine (French pronunciation: [naʁbefɔ̃tɛn]; German: Memersbronn; Lorraine Franconian Memerschbronn) is a commune in the Moselle department in Grand Est in north-eastern France.

== List of mayors ==
- Jean Muller (1988 - March 2001)
- Marie-Paule Dolle (March 2001 - March 2008)
- Christiane Muller (March 2008 - )

== Population ==
Historical population
Year	Pop.	±% p.a.
1968	106	—
1975	97	−1.26%
1982	102	+0.72%
1990	117	+1.73%
1999	118	+0.09%
2007	134	+1.60%
2012	127	−1.07%
2017	118	−1.46%
2023	115	−0.43%
Source: INSEE

== See also ==
- Communes of the Moselle department
