= Volmerange-lès-Boulay =

- Commune
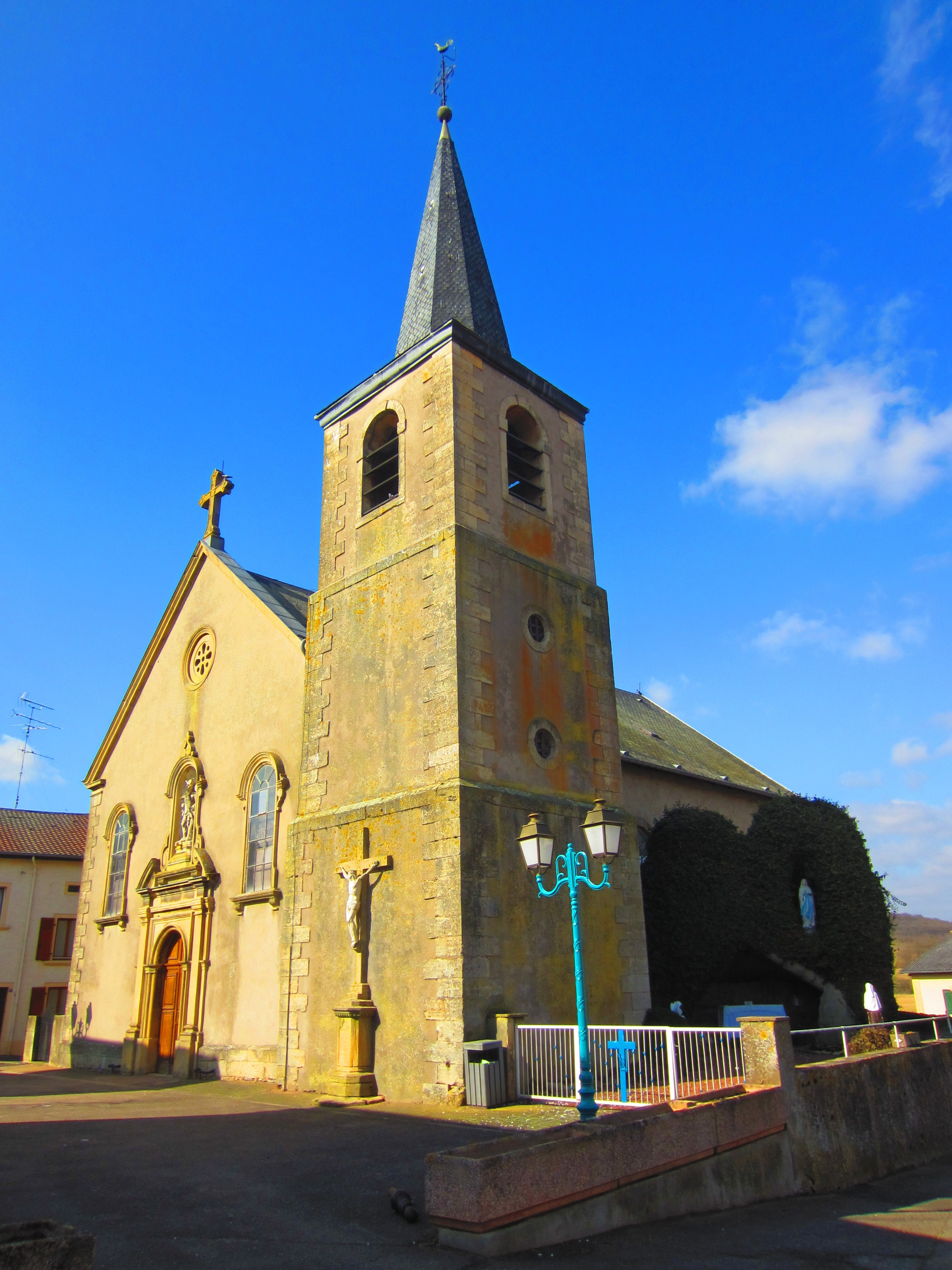
- The church in Volmerange-lès-Boulay

- Coat of arms
- Location of Volmerange-lès-Boulay
- Location within France Location within Grand Est
- Coordinates: 49°10′09″N 6°26′55″E
- Country: France
- Region: Grand Est
- Department: Moselle
- Arrondissement: Forbach-Boulay-Moselle
- Canton: Boulay-Moselle
- Intercommunality: Houve-Pays Boulageois

Government
  - Mayor (2020–2026): Pierre Albert
- Area^{1}: 5.96 km^{2} (2.30 sq mi)
- Elevation: 340 m (1,120 ft)
- Highest elevation: 305 m (1,001 ft)
- Lowest elevation: 200 m (660 ft)
- Population (2023): 548
  - Density: 91.9/km^{2} (238/sq mi)
- Time zone: UTC+01:00 (CET)
  - Summer (DST): UTC+02:00 (CEST)
- INSEE/Postal code: 57730 /57220
- ^{1} French Land Register data, which excludes lakes, ponds, glaciers > 1 km^{2} (0.386 sq mi or 247 acres) and river estuaries.

Volmerange-lès-Boulay (French pronunciation: [vɔlməʁɑ̃ʒ lɛ bulɛ], literally Volmerange near Boulay; German: Wolmeringen; Lorraine Franconian Wolmeringen) is a commune in the Moselle department in Grand Est in north-eastern France.

== See also ==
- Communes of the Moselle department
