= Guerting =

- Commune
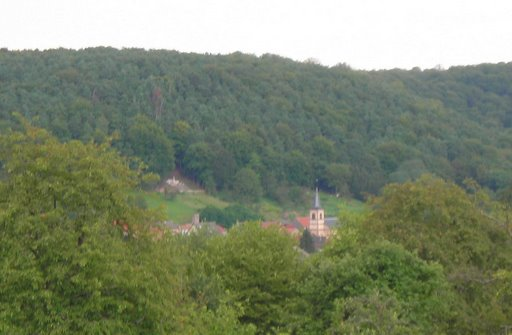
- The village seen from the hillside

- Coat of arms
- Location of Guerting
- Location within France Location within Grand Est
- Coordinates: 49°11′23″N 6°37′16″E
- Country: France
- Region: Grand Est
- Department: Moselle
- Arrondissement: Forbach-Boulay-Moselle
- Canton: Boulay-Moselle
- Intercommunality: CC du Warndt

Government
  - Mayor (2020–2026): Yves Tonnelier
- Area^{1}: 5.64 km^{2} (2.18 sq mi)
- Elevation: 245 m (804 ft)
- Highest elevation: 345 m (1,132 ft)
- Lowest elevation: 223 m (732 ft)
- Population (2023): 866
  - Density: 154/km^{2} (398/sq mi)
- Demonym(s): Guertingeois, Guertingeoise
- Time zone: UTC+01:00 (CET)
  - Summer (DST): UTC+02:00 (CEST)
- INSEE/Postal code: 57274 /57880
- ^{1} French Land Register data, which excludes lakes, ponds, glaciers > 1 km^{2} (0.386 sq mi or 247 acres) and river estuaries.

Guerting (French pronunciation: [ɡɛʁtɛ̃]; German: Gertingen; Lorraine Franconian: Gerténgen) is a commune in the Moselle department in Grand Est in north-eastern France.

== See also ==
- Communes of the Moselle department
