= Bisten-en-Lorraine =

- Commune
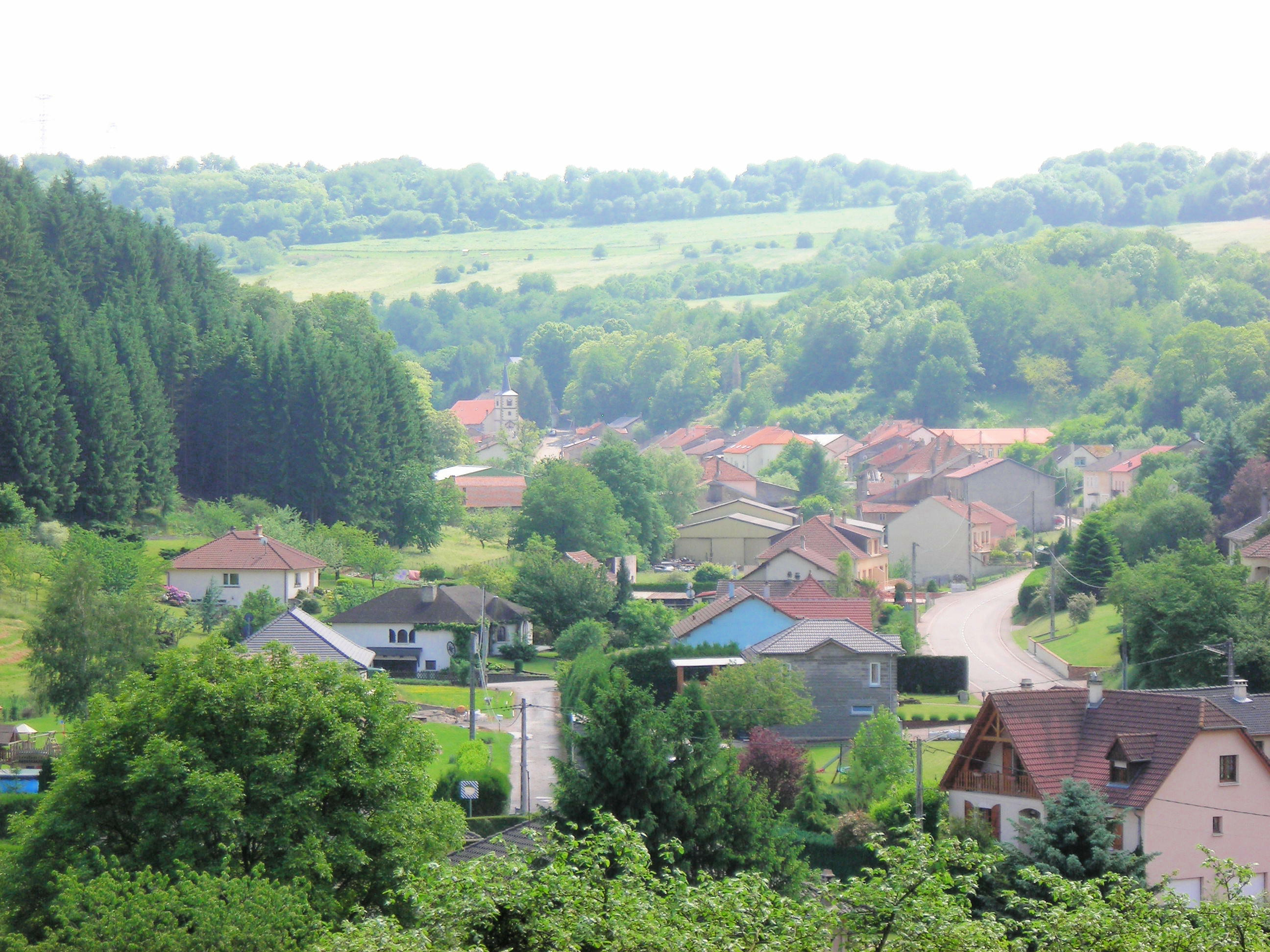
- A general view of Bisten-en-Lorraine

- Coat of arms
- Location of Bisten-en-Lorraine
- Location within France Location within Grand Est
- Coordinates: 49°09′46″N 6°35′56″E
- Country: France
- Region: Grand Est
- Department: Moselle
- Arrondissement: Forbach-Boulay-Moselle
- Canton: Boulay-Moselle
- Intercommunality: Warndt

Government
  - Mayor (2020–2026): Pierre Thil
- Area^{1}: 4.48 km^{2} (1.73 sq mi)
- Elevation: 260 m (850 ft)
- Highest elevation: 390 m (1,280 ft)
- Lowest elevation: 235 m (771 ft)
- Population (2023): 245
  - Density: 54.7/km^{2} (142/sq mi)
- Time zone: UTC+01:00 (CET)
  - Summer (DST): UTC+02:00 (CEST)
- INSEE/Postal code: 57087 /57220
- ^{1} French Land Register data, which excludes lakes, ponds, glaciers > 1 km^{2} (0.386 sq mi or 247 acres) and river estuaries.

Bisten-en-Lorraine (French pronunciation: [bistən ɑ̃ lɔʁɛn], literally Bisten in Lorraine; German: Bisten im Loch) is a commune in the Moselle department in Grand Est in northeastern France.

== Population ==
Historical population
Year	Pop.	±% p.a.
1968	263	—
1975	254	−0.50%
1982	241	−0.75%
1990	257	+0.81%
1999	255	−0.09%
2007	271	+0.76%
2012	253	−1.37%
2017	246	−0.56%
2023	245	−0.07%
Source: INSEE

== See also ==
- Communes of the Moselle department
