= Varsberg =

- Commune
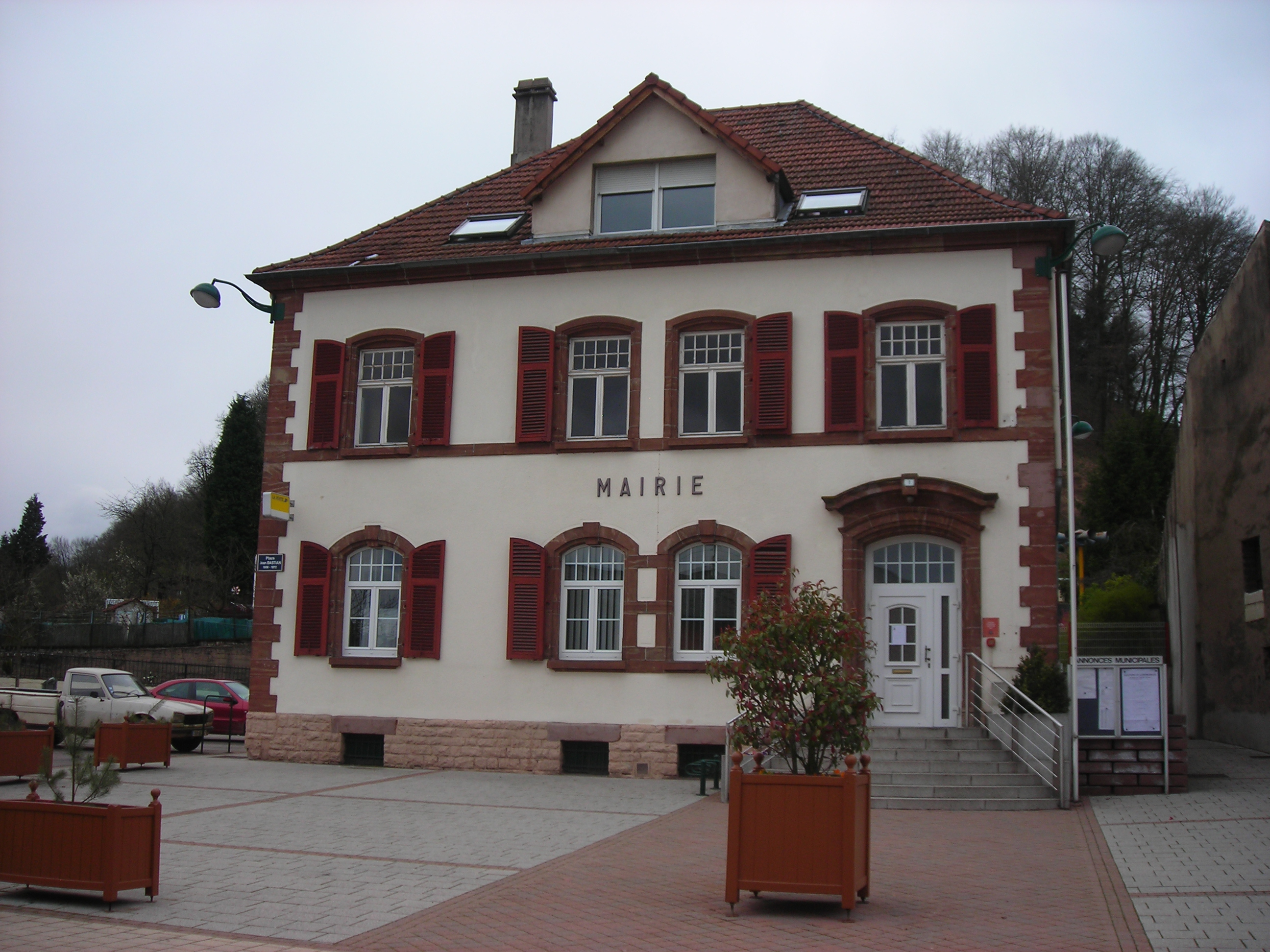
- La mairie de Varsberg

- Coat of arms
- Location of Varsberg
- Location within France Location within Grand Est
- Coordinates: 49°10′24″N 6°37′46″E
- Country: France
- Region: Grand Est
- Department: Moselle
- Arrondissement: Forbach-Boulay-Moselle
- Canton: Boulay-Moselle
- Intercommunality: CC du Warndt

Government
  - Mayor (2020–2026): Pierrot Moritz
- Area^{1}: 4.15 km^{2} (1.60 sq mi)
- Elevation: 230 m (750 ft)
- Highest elevation: 395 m (1,296 ft)
- Lowest elevation: 222 m (728 ft)
- Population (2023): 973
  - Density: 234/km^{2} (607/sq mi)
- Demonym: Varsbergeois(es)
- Time zone: UTC+01:00 (CET)
  - Summer (DST): UTC+02:00 (CEST)
- INSEE/Postal code: 57696 /57880
- ^{1} French Land Register data, which excludes lakes, ponds, glaciers > 1 km^{2} (0.386 sq mi or 247 acres) and river estuaries.

Varsberg (French pronunciation: [vaʁsbɛʁɡ]; German: Warsberg) is a commune in the Moselle department in Grand Est in north-eastern France.

== See also ==
- Communes of the Moselle department
