= Arrondissement of Forbach =

Coordinates: 49.18°N 6.90°E

Forbach
- Former arrondissement
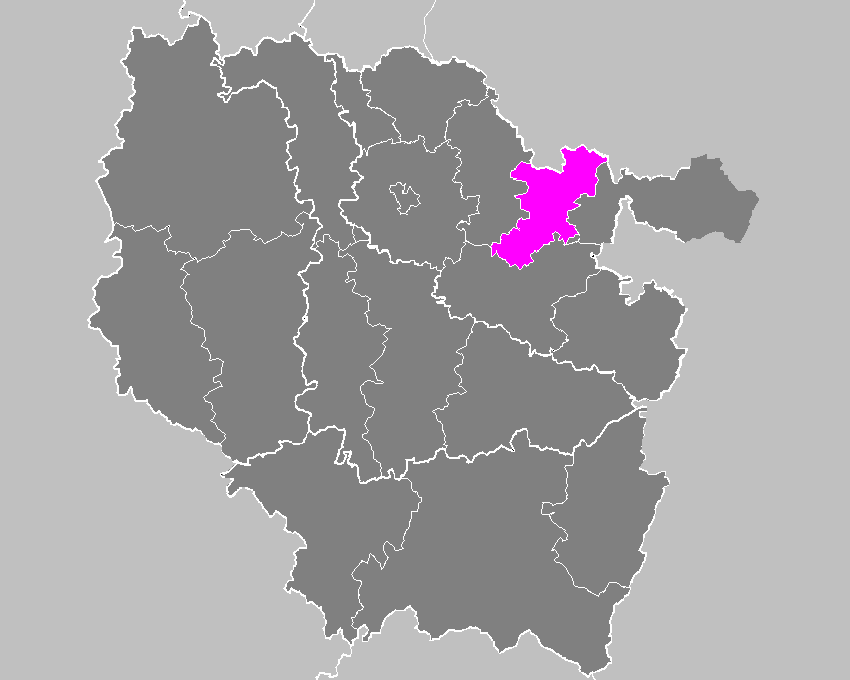
- Location within the former region Lorraine
- Country: France
- Region: Grand Est
- Department: Moselle
- No. of communes: {{{nbcomm}}}
- Disbanded: 2015
- Area: 561 km^{2} (217 sq mi)
- Population (2012): 167,518
  - Density: 299/km^{2} (773/sq mi)

The arrondissement of Forbach is a former arrondissement of France in the Moselle department in the Lorraine region. In 2015 it was merged into the new arrondissement of Forbach-Boulay-Moselle. It had 73 communes, and its population was 167,518 (2012).

== Composition ==
The communes of the arrondissement of Forbach, and their INSEE codes, were:

| 1. Alsting (57013) | 2. Altrippe (57014) | 3. Altviller (57015) | 4. Baronville (57051) |
| 5. Barst (57052) | 6. Behren-lès-Forbach (57058) | 7. Betting (57073) | 8. Biding (57082) |
| 9. Bistroff (57088) | 10. Bousbach (57101) | 11. Boustroff (57105) | 12. Brulange (57115) |
| 13. Béning-lès-Saint-Avold (57061) | 14. Bérig-Vintrange (57063) | 15. Cappel (57122) | 16. Carling (57123) |
| 17. Cocheren (57144) | 18. Destry (57174) | 19. Diebling (57176) | 20. Diesen (57765) |
| 21. Diffembach-lès-Hellimer (57178) | 22. Eincheville (57189) | 23. Erstroff (57198) | 24. Etzling (57202) |
| 25. Farschviller (57208) | 26. Farébersviller (57207) | 27. Folkling (57222) | 28. Folschviller (57224) |
| 29. Forbach (57227) | 30. Freybouse (57239) | 31. Freyming-Merlebach (57240) | 32. Frémestroff (57237) |
| 33. Grostenquin (57262) | 34. Gréning (57258) | 35. Guenviller (57271) | 36. Guessling-Hémering (57275) |
| 37. Harprich (57297) | 38. Hellimer (57311) | 39. Henriville (57316) | 40. Hombourg-Haut (57332) |
| 41. Hoste (57337) | 42. Kerbach (57360) | 43. L'Hôpital (57336) | 44. Lachambre (57373) |
| 45. Landroff (57379) | 46. Laning (57384) | 47. Lelling (57389) | 48. Leyviller (57398) |
| 49. Lixing-lès-Saint-Avold (57409) | 50. Macheren (57428) | 51. Maxstadt (57453) | 52. Metzing (57466) |
| 53. Morhange (57483) | 54. Morsbach (57484) | 55. Nousseviller-Saint-Nabor (57514) | 56. Œting (57521) |
| 57. Petit-Tenquin (57536) | 58. Petite-Rosselle (57537) | 59. Porcelette (57550) | 60. Racrange (57560) |
| 61. Rosbruck (57596) | 62. Saint-Avold (57606) | 63. Schœneck (57638) | 64. Seingbouse (57644) |
| 65. Spicheren (57659) | 66. Stiring-Wendel (57660) | 67. Suisse (57662) | 68. Tenteling (57665) |
| 69. Théding (57669) | 70. Vahl-Ebersing (57684) | 71. Vallerange (57687) | 72. Valmont (57690) |
| 73. Viller (57717) | | | |

== History ==
The arrondissement of Forbach was created in 1919. In January 2000 it lost the canton of Sarralbe to the arrondissement of Sarreguemines. It was disbanded in 2015. As a result of the reorganisation of the cantons of France which came into effect in 2015, the borders of the cantons are no longer related to the borders of the arrondissements. The cantons of the arrondissement of Forbach were, as of January 2015:

1. Behren-lès-Forbach
2. Forbach
3. Freyming-Merlebach
4. Grostenquin
5. Saint-Avold-1
6. Saint-Avold-2
7. Stiring-Wendel

== Sub-prefects ==
- Régis Guyot (1990)
