= Saint-Avold 2nd Canton =

Coordinates: 49°07′21″N 6°44′33″E

Saint-Avold-2
- Former canton
- Interactive map of Saint-Avold-2
- Country: France
- Region: Grand Est
- Department: Moselle
- No. of communes: {{{nbcomm}}}
- Disbanded: 2015
- Population (2012): 21,046

The 2nd Canton of Saint-Avold is a French former administrative division, located in the arrondissement of Forbach, in the Moselle département (Lorraine région). It was disbanded following the French canton reorganisation which came into effect in March 2015. It had 21,046 inhabitants in 2012.

== Composition ==
The canton of Saint-Avold-2 comprised 6 communes:

- Carling
- Hombourg-Haut
- L'Hôpital
- Lachambre
- Macheren
- Saint-Avold (partly)

== See also ==
- Cantons of the Moselle department
- Communes of the Moselle department
