= Canton of Sarralbe =

Coordinates: 49.00°N 7.03°E

The canton of Sarralbe is an administrative division of the Moselle department, northeastern France. Its borders were modified at the French canton reorganisation which came into effect in March 2015. Its seat is in Sarralbe.

It consists of the following communes:

1. Altrippe
2. Baronville
3. Bérig-Vintrange
4. Biding
5. Bistroff
6. Boustroff
7. Brulange
8. Destry
9. Diffembach-lès-Hellimer
10. Eincheville
11. Ernestviller
12. Erstroff
13. Frémestroff
14. Freybouse
15. Gréning
16. Grostenquin
17. Grundviller
18. Guebenhouse
19. Guessling-Hémering
20. Harprich
21. Hazembourg
22. Hellimer
23. Hilsprich
24. Holving
25. Kappelkinger
26. Kirviller
27. Landroff
28. Laning
29. Lelling
30. Leyviller
31. Lixing-lès-Saint-Avold
32. Loupershouse
33. Maxstadt
34. Morhange
35. Nelling
36. Petit-Tenquin
37. Puttelange-aux-Lacs
38. Racrange
39. Rémering-lès-Puttelange
40. Richeling
41. Saint-Jean-Rohrbach
42. Sarralbe
43. Suisse
44. Vahl-Ebersing
45. Le Val-de-Guéblange
46. Vallerange
47. Viller
48. Woustviller
