= Arrondissement of Forbach-Boulay-Moselle =

Coordinates: 49.1°N 6.7°E

Forbach-Boulay-Moselle
- Arrondissement
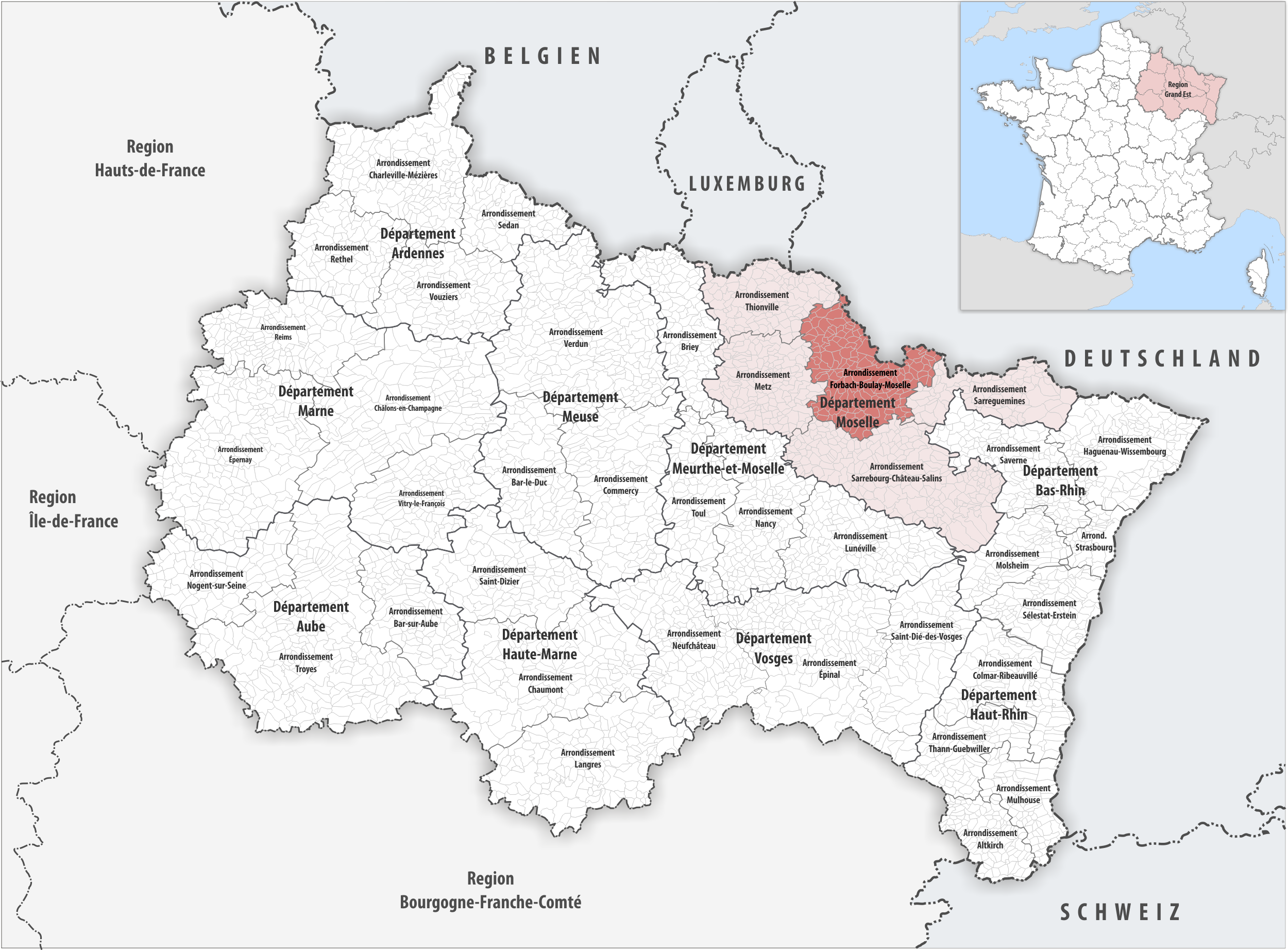
- Location within the region Grand Est
- Country: France
- Region: Grand Est
- Department: Moselle
- No. of communes: {{{nbcomm}}}
- Area: 1,283.3 km^{2} (495.5 sq mi)
- Population (2023): 234,103
  - Density: 182.42/km^{2} (472.47/sq mi)
- INSEE code: 573

The arrondissement of Forbach-Boulay-Moselle is an arrondissement of France in the Moselle department in the Grand Est region. It has 169 communes. Its population is 237,242 (2021), and its area is 1,283.3 km^{2} (495.5 sq mi).

== Composition ==
The communes of the arrondissement of Forbach-Boulay-Moselle are:

1. Adaincourt
2. Adelange
3. Alsting
4. Altrippe
5. Altviller
6. Alzing
7. Anzeling
8. Arraincourt
9. Arriance
10. Bambiderstroff
11. Bannay
12. Baronville
13. Barst
14. Behren-lès-Forbach
15. Béning-lès-Saint-Avold
16. Bérig-Vintrange
17. Berviller-en-Moselle
18. Bettange
19. Betting
20. Bibiche
21. Biding
22. Bionville-sur-Nied
23. Bisten-en-Lorraine
24. Bistroff
25. Boucheporn
26. Boulay-Moselle
27. Bousbach
28. Boustroff
29. Bouzonville
30. Brettnach
31. Brouck
32. Brulange
33. Cappel
34. Carling
35. Château-Rouge
36. Chémery-les-Deux
37. Cocheren
38. Colmen
39. Condé-Northen
40. Coume
41. Créhange
42. Creutzwald
43. Dalem
44. Dalstein
45. Denting
46. Destry
47. Diebling
48. Diesen
49. Diffembach-lès-Hellimer
50. Ébersviller
51. Éblange
52. Eincheville
53. Elvange
54. Erstroff
55. Etzling
56. Falck
57. Farébersviller
58. Farschviller
59. Faulquemont
60. Filstroff
61. Flétrange
62. Folkling
63. Folschviller
64. Forbach
65. Fouligny
66. Freistroff
67. Frémestroff
68. Freybouse
69. Freyming-Merlebach
70. Gomelange
71. Gréning
72. Grostenquin
73. Guenviller
74. Guerstling
75. Guerting
76. Guessling-Hémering
77. Guinglange
78. Guinkirchen
79. Hallering
80. Ham-sous-Varsberg
81. Han-sur-Nied
82. Hargarten-aux-Mines
83. Harprich
84. Haute-Vigneulles
85. Heining-lès-Bouzonville
86. Hellimer
87. Helstroff
88. Hémilly
89. Henriville
90. Herny
91. Hestroff
92. Hinckange
93. Holacourt
94. Holling
95. Hombourg-Haut
96. L'Hôpital
97. Hoste
98. Kerbach
99. Lachambre
100. Landroff
101. Laning
102. Laudrefang
103. Lelling
104. Leyviller
105. Lixing-lès-Saint-Avold
106. Longeville-lès-Saint-Avold
107. Macheren
108. Mainvillers
109. Many
110. Marange-Zondrange
111. Maxstadt
112. Mégange
113. Menskirch
114. Merten
115. Metzing
116. Momerstroff
117. Morhange
118. Morsbach
119. Narbéfontaine
120. Neunkirchen-lès-Bouzonville
121. Niedervisse
122. Nousseviller-Saint-Nabor
123. Oberdorff
124. Obervisse
125. Œting
126. Ottonville
127. Petite-Rosselle
128. Petit-Tenquin
129. Piblange
130. Pontpierre
131. Porcelette
132. Racrange
133. Rémelfang
134. Rémering
135. Rosbruck
136. Roupeldange
137. Saint-Avold
138. Saint-François-Lacroix
139. Schœneck
140. Schwerdorff
141. Seingbouse
142. Spicheren
143. Stiring-Wendel
144. Suisse
145. Tenteling
146. Téterchen
147. Teting-sur-Nied
148. Théding
149. Thicourt
150. Thonville
151. Tritteling-Redlach
152. Tromborn
153. Vahl-Ebersing
154. Vahl-lès-Faulquemont
155. Vallerange
156. Valmont
157. Valmunster
158. Varize-Vaudoncourt
159. Varsberg
160. Vatimont
161. Vaudreching
162. Velving
163. Viller
164. Villing
165. Vittoncourt
166. Vœlfling-lès-Bouzonville
167. Voimhaut
168. Volmerange-lès-Boulay
169. Zimming

== History ==
The arrondissement of Forbach-Boulay-Moselle was created in January 2015 by the merger of the former arrondissements of Forbach and Boulay-Moselle.
