= Communauté d'agglomération Saint-Avold Synergie =

Saint-Avold Synergie
- Communauté d'agglomération
- Interactive map of Saint-Avold Synergie
- Coordinates: 49°05′N 06°45′E
- Country: France
- Region: Grand Est
- Department: Moselle
- No. of communes: {{{nbcomm}}}
- Established: 2017
- Area: 347.5 km^{2} (134.2 sq mi)
- Population (2019): 52,757
  - Density: 151.8/km^{2} (393.2/sq mi)
- Website: www.agglo-saint-avold.fr

Communauté d'agglomération Saint-Avold Synergie is the communauté d'agglomération, an intercommunal structure, centred on the town of Saint-Avold. It is located in the Moselle department, in the Grand Est region, northeastern France. Created in 2017, its seat is in Saint-Avold. Its area is 347.5 km^{2}. Its population was 52,757 in 2019, of which 15,415 in Saint-Avold proper.

== Composition ==
The communauté d'agglomération consists of the following 41 communes:

1. Altrippe
2. Altviller
3. Baronville
4. Bérig-Vintrange
5. Biding
6. Bistroff
7. Boustroff
8. Brulange
9. Carling
10. Destry
11. Diesen
12. Diffembach-lès-Hellimer
13. Eincheville
14. Erstroff
15. Folschviller
16. Frémestroff
17. Freybouse
18. Gréning
19. Grostenquin
20. Guessling-Hémering
21. Harprich
22. Hellimer
23. L'Hôpital
24. Lachambre
25. Landroff
26. Laning
27. Lelling
28. Leyviller
29. Lixing-lès-Saint-Avold
30. Macheren
31. Maxstadt
32. Morhange
33. Petit-Tenquin
34. Porcelette
35. Racrange
36. Saint-Avold
37. Suisse
38. Vahl-Ebersing
39. Vallerange
40. Valmont
41. Viller
