= Erstroff =

- Commune
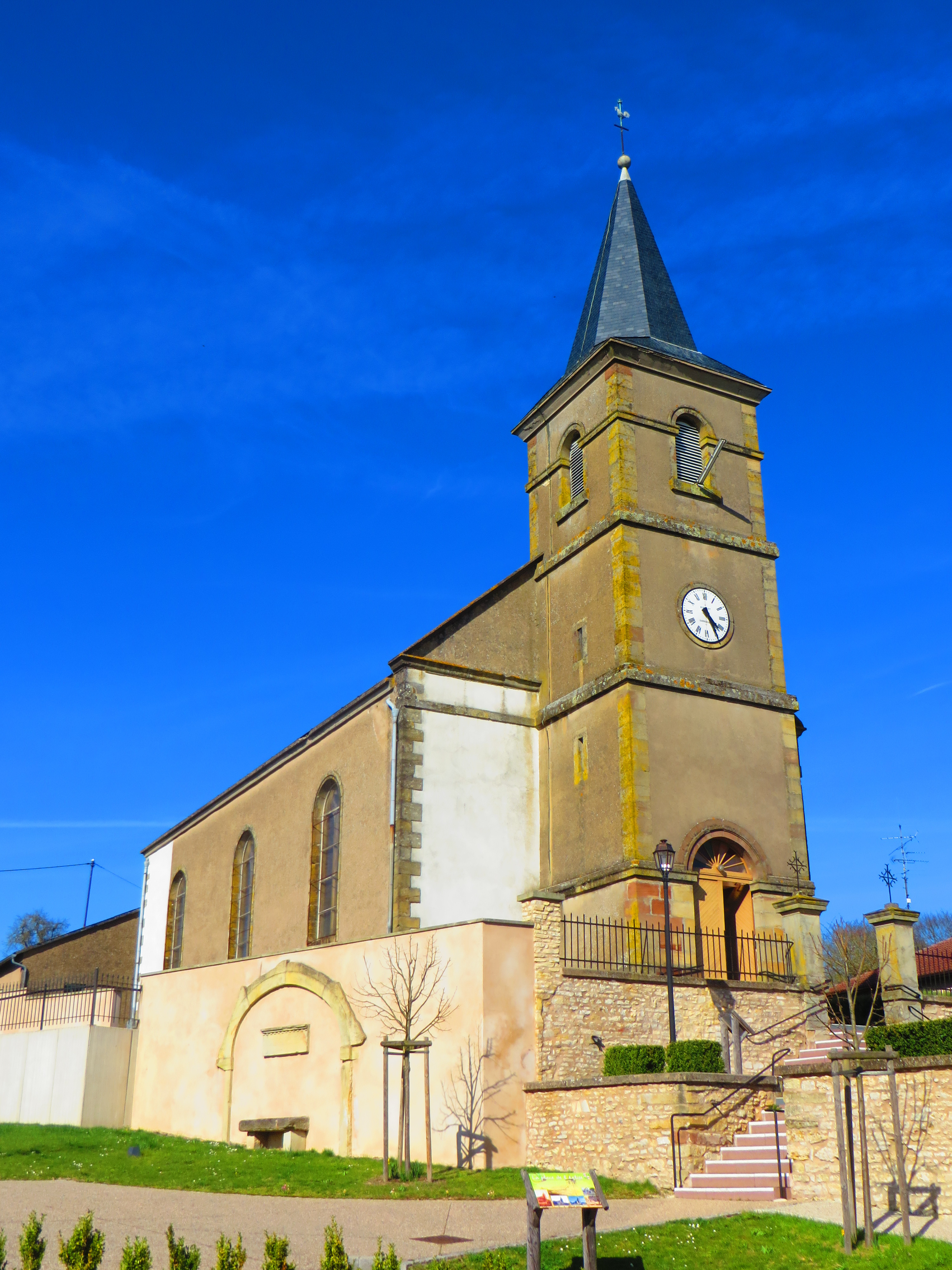
- The church in Erstroff

- Coat of arms
- Location of Erstroff
- Location within France Location within Grand Est
- Coordinates: 48°58′50″N 6°46′35″E
- Country: France
- Region: Grand Est
- Department: Moselle
- Arrondissement: Forbach-Boulay-Moselle
- Canton: Sarralbe
- Intercommunality: CA Saint-Avold Synergie

Government
  - Mayor (2020–2026): Jean-Claude Bohn
- Area^{1}: 5.05 km^{2} (1.95 sq mi)
- Elevation: 230 m (750 ft)
- Highest elevation: 278 m (912 ft)
- Lowest elevation: 227 m (745 ft)
- Population (2023): 187
  - Density: 37.0/km^{2} (95.9/sq mi)
- Time zone: UTC+01:00 (CET)
  - Summer (DST): UTC+02:00 (CEST)
- INSEE/Postal code: 57198 /57660
- ^{1} French Land Register data, which excludes lakes, ponds, glaciers > 1 km^{2} (0.386 sq mi or 247 acres) and river estuaries.

Erstroff (French pronunciation: [ɛʁstʁɔf]; German: Ersdorf) is a commune in the Moselle department in Grand Est in north-eastern France.

== See also ==
- Communes of the Moselle department
