= Altrippe =

- Commune
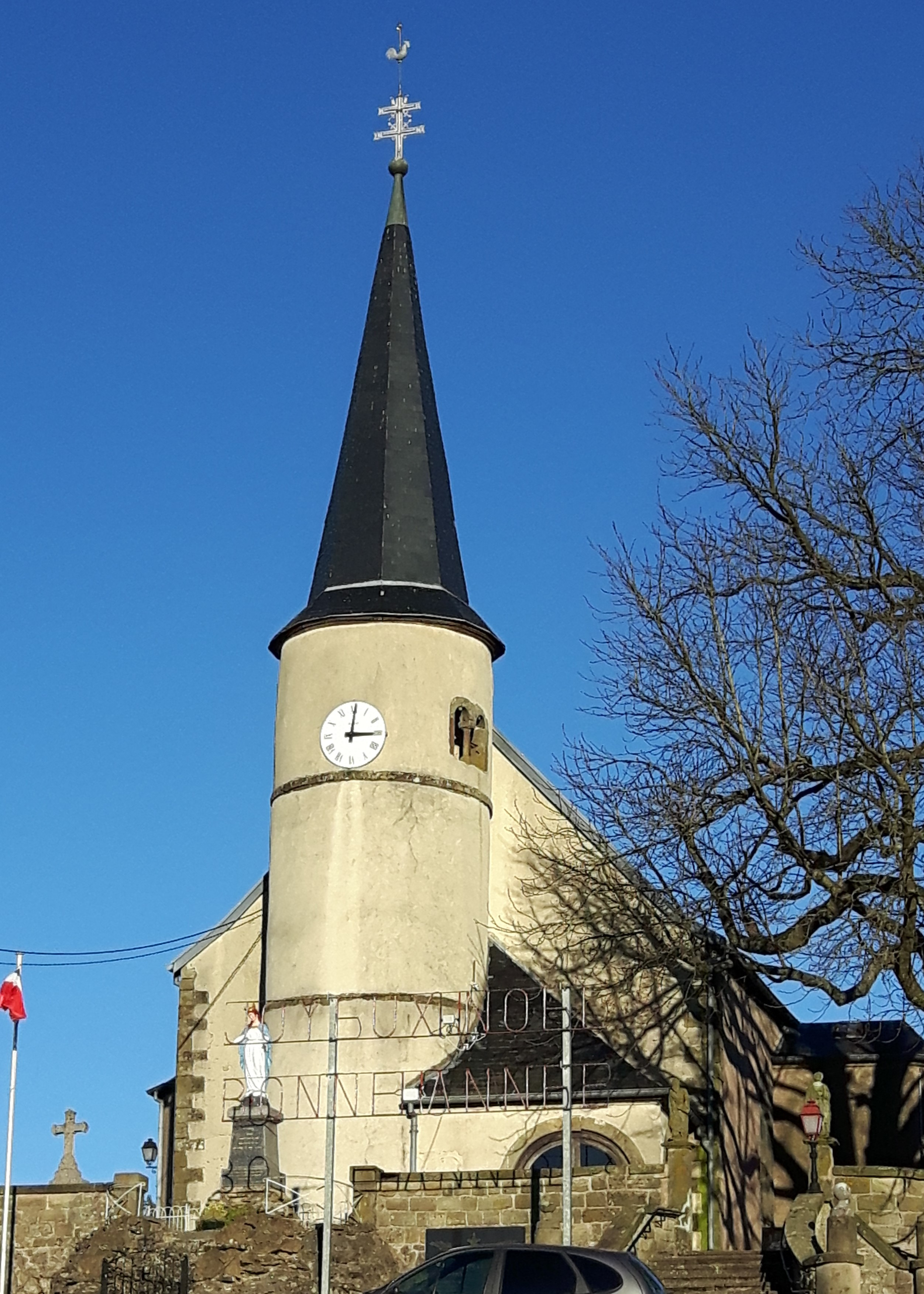
- The church in Altrippe

- Coat of arms
- Location of Altrippe
- Location within France Location within Grand Est
- Coordinates: 49°01′47″N 6°49′13″E
- Country: France
- Region: Grand Est
- Department: Moselle
- Arrondissement: Forbach-Boulay-Moselle
- Canton: Sarralbe
- Intercommunality: CA Saint-Avold Synergie

Government
  - Mayor (2020–2026): Alain Konieczny
- Area^{1}: 4.88 km^{2} (1.88 sq mi)
- Elevation: 250 m (820 ft)
- Highest elevation: 325 m (1,066 ft)
- Lowest elevation: 239 m (784 ft)
- Population (2023): 365
  - Density: 74.8/km^{2} (194/sq mi)
- Time zone: UTC+01:00 (CET)
  - Summer (DST): UTC+02:00 (CEST)
- INSEE/Postal code: 57014 /57660
- ^{1} French Land Register data, which excludes lakes, ponds, glaciers > 1 km^{2} (0.386 sq mi or 247 acres) and river estuaries.

Altrippe (French pronunciation: [altʁip]; German: also Altrippe) is a commune in the Moselle department in Grand Est in northeastern France.

== Population ==
Historical population
Year	Pop.	±% p.a.
1968	233	—
1975	272	+2.24%
1982	308	+1.79%
1990	369	+2.28%
1999	404	+1.01%
2007	429	+0.75%
2012	392	−1.79%
2017	382	−0.52%
2023	365	−0.76%
Source: INSEE

== See also ==
- Communes of the Moselle department
