= Brulange =

- Commune
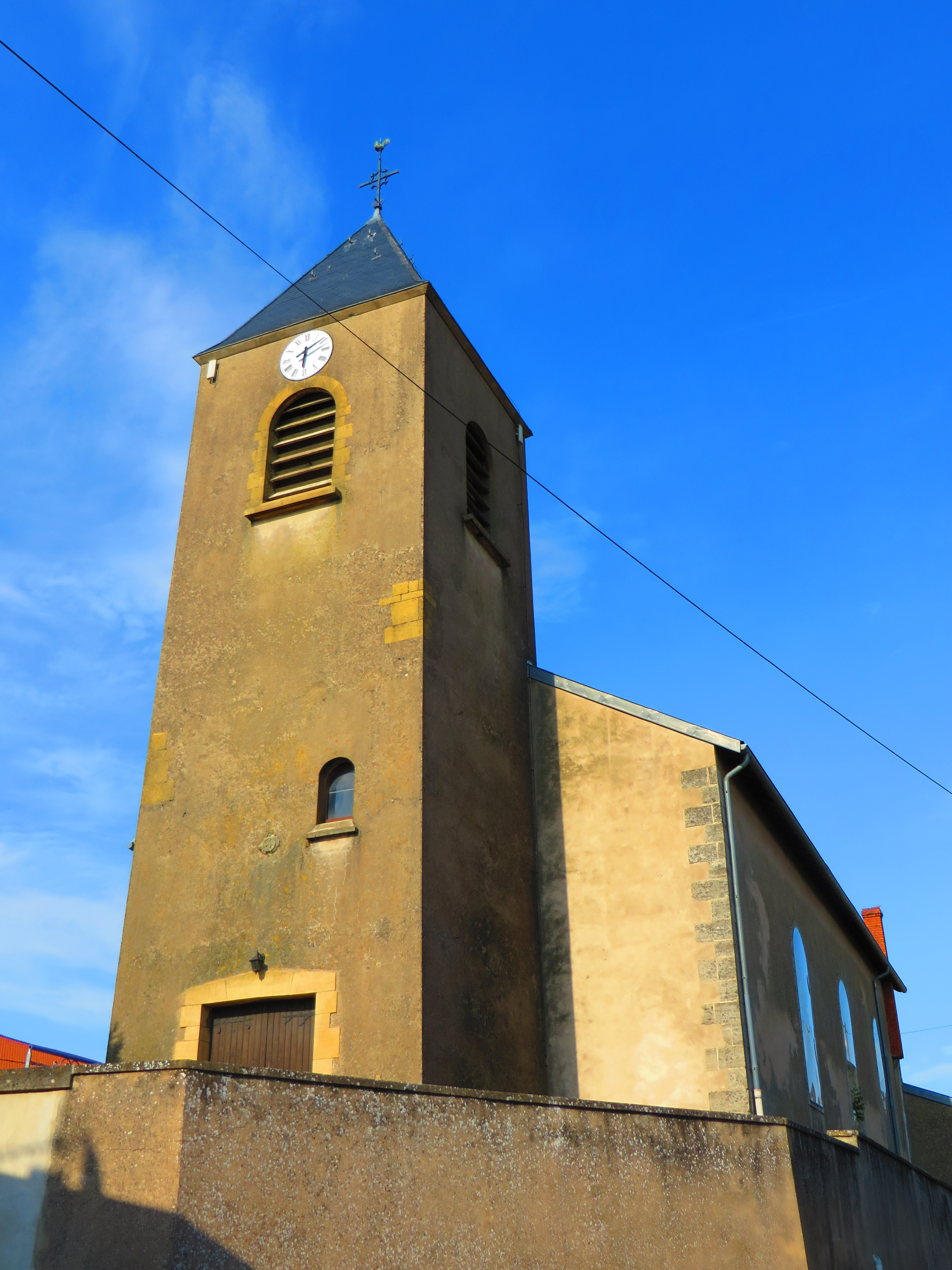
- The church in Brulange

- Coat of arms
- Location of Brulange
- Location within France Location within Grand Est
- Coordinates: 48°58′16″N 6°33′01″E
- Country: France
- Region: Grand Est
- Department: Moselle
- Arrondissement: Forbach-Boulay-Moselle
- Canton: Sarralbe
- Intercommunality: CA Saint-Avold Synergie

Government
  - Mayor (2020–2026): Jean-Claude Mayot
- Area^{1}: 5.85 km^{2} (2.26 sq mi)
- Elevation: 200 m (660 ft)
- Highest elevation: 354 m (1,161 ft)
- Lowest elevation: 232 m (761 ft)
- Population (2023): 99
  - Density: 17/km^{2} (44/sq mi)
- Time zone: UTC+01:00 (CET)
  - Summer (DST): UTC+02:00 (CEST)
- INSEE/Postal code: 57115 /57340
- ^{1} French Land Register data, which excludes lakes, ponds, glaciers > 1 km^{2} (0.386 sq mi or 247 acres) and river estuaries.

Brulange (French pronunciation: [bʁylɑ̃ʒ]; German: Brüllingen) is a commune in the Moselle department in Grand Est in northeastern France.

== Population ==
Historical population
Year	Pop.	±% p.a.
1968	140	—
1975	112	−3.14%
1982	100	−1.61%
1990	92	−1.04%
1999	93	+0.12%
2007	109	+2.00%
2012	105	−0.74%
2017	100	−0.97%
2023	99	−0.17%
Source: INSEE

== See also ==
- Communes of the Moselle department
