= Suisse, Moselle =

Suisse
- Commune
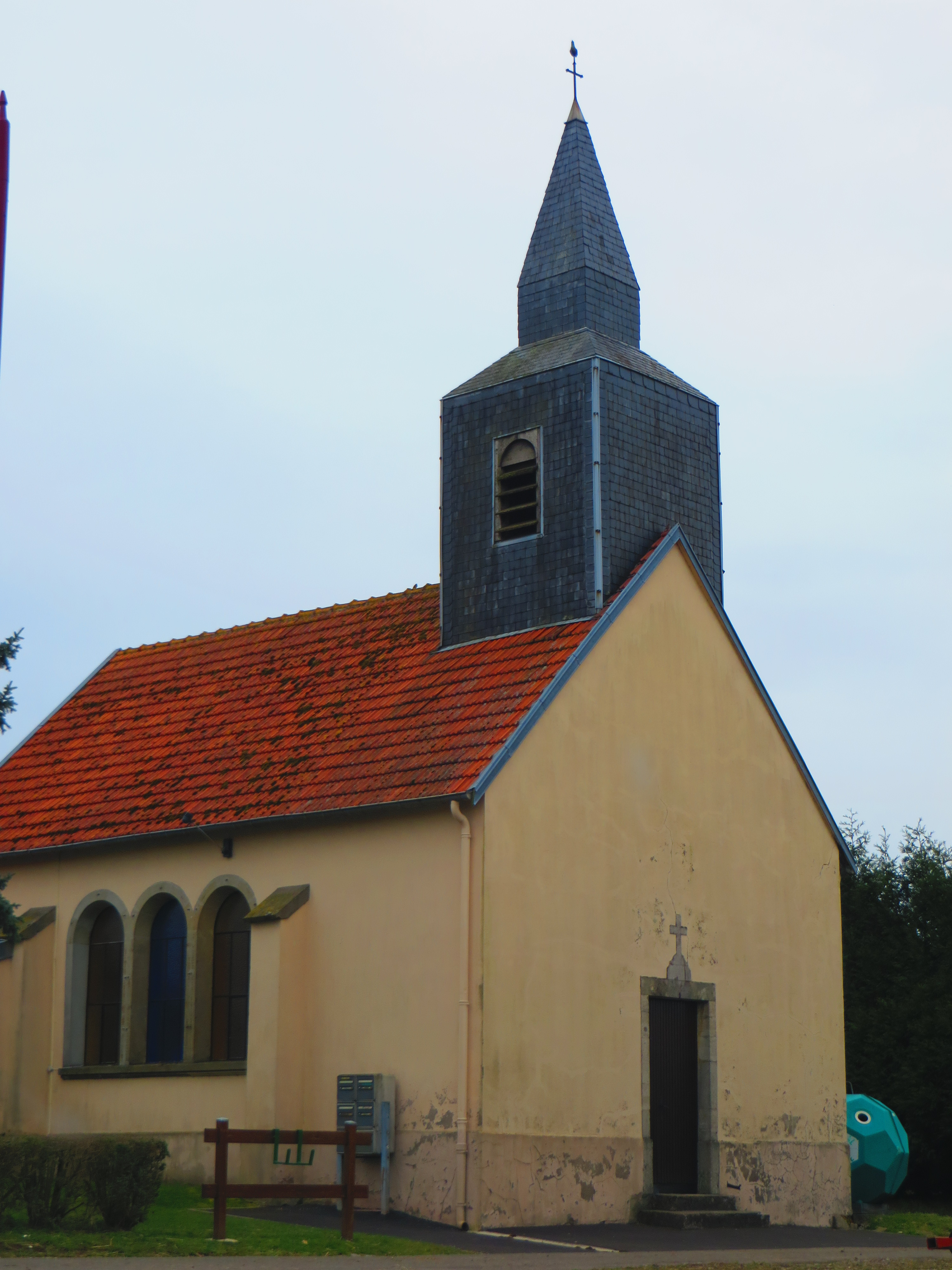
- The church in Suisse

- Coat of arms
- Location of Suisse
- Location within France Location within Grand Est
- Coordinates: 48°58′00″N 6°34′49″E
- Country: France
- Region: Grand Est
- Department: Moselle
- Arrondissement: Forbach-Boulay-Moselle
- Canton: Sarralbe
- Intercommunality: CA Saint-Avold Synergie

Government
  - Mayor (2023–2026): Michel Gaillot
- Area^{1}: 5.03 km^{2} (1.94 sq mi)
- Elevation: 320 m (1,050 ft)
- Highest elevation: 297 m (974 ft)
- Lowest elevation: 233 m (764 ft)
- Population (2023): 94
  - Density: 19/km^{2} (48/sq mi)
- Time zone: UTC+01:00 (CET)
  - Summer (DST): UTC+02:00 (CEST)
- INSEE/Postal code: 57662 /57340
- ^{1} French Land Register data, which excludes lakes, ponds, glaciers > 1 km^{2} (0.386 sq mi or 247 acres) and river estuaries.

Suisse (French pronunciation: [sɥis]; German: Sülzen) is a commune in the Moselle department in Grand Est in north-eastern France.

== See also ==
- Communes of the Moselle department
