= Leyviller =

- Commune
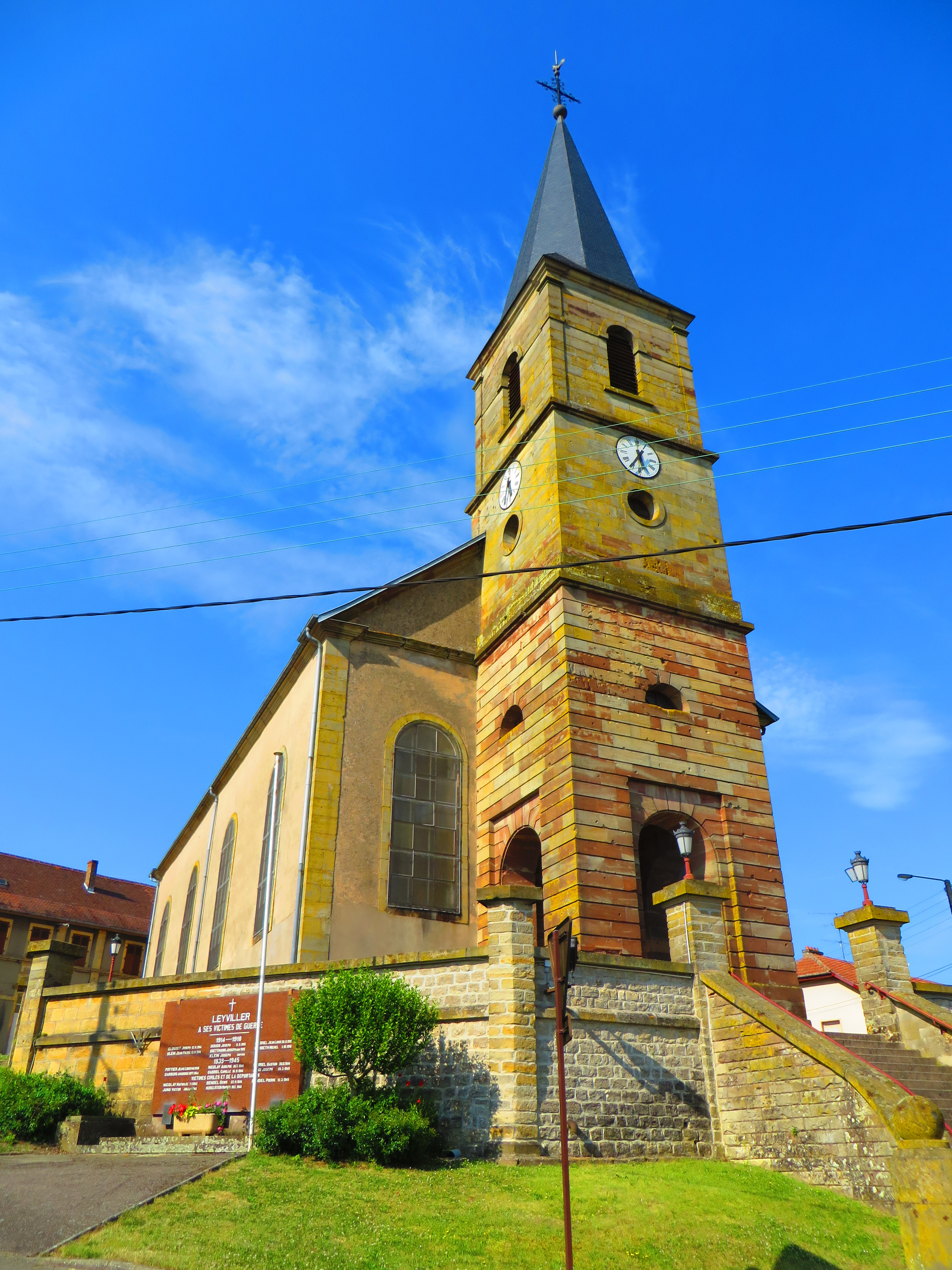
- The church in Leyviller

- Coat of arms
- Location of Leyviller
- Location within France Location within Grand Est
- Coordinates: 49°01′57″N 6°50′10″E
- Country: France
- Region: Grand Est
- Department: Moselle
- Arrondissement: Forbach-Boulay-Moselle
- Canton: Sarralbe
- Intercommunality: CA Saint-Avold Synergie

Government
  - Mayor (2020–2026): Daniel Ballie
- Area^{1}: 7.25 km^{2} (2.80 sq mi)
- Elevation: 240 m (790 ft)
- Highest elevation: 291 m (955 ft)
- Lowest elevation: 224 m (735 ft)
- Population (2023): 502
  - Density: 69.2/km^{2} (179/sq mi)
- Time zone: UTC+01:00 (CET)
  - Summer (DST): UTC+02:00 (CEST)
- INSEE/Postal code: 57398 /57660
- ^{1} French Land Register data, which excludes lakes, ponds, glaciers > 1 km^{2} (0.386 sq mi or 247 acres) and river estuaries.

Leyviller (French pronunciation: [levilɛʁ]; German: Leyweiler) is a commune in the Moselle department in Grand Est in north-eastern France.

== See also ==
- Communes of the Moselle department
