= Lixing-lès-Saint-Avold =

- Commune
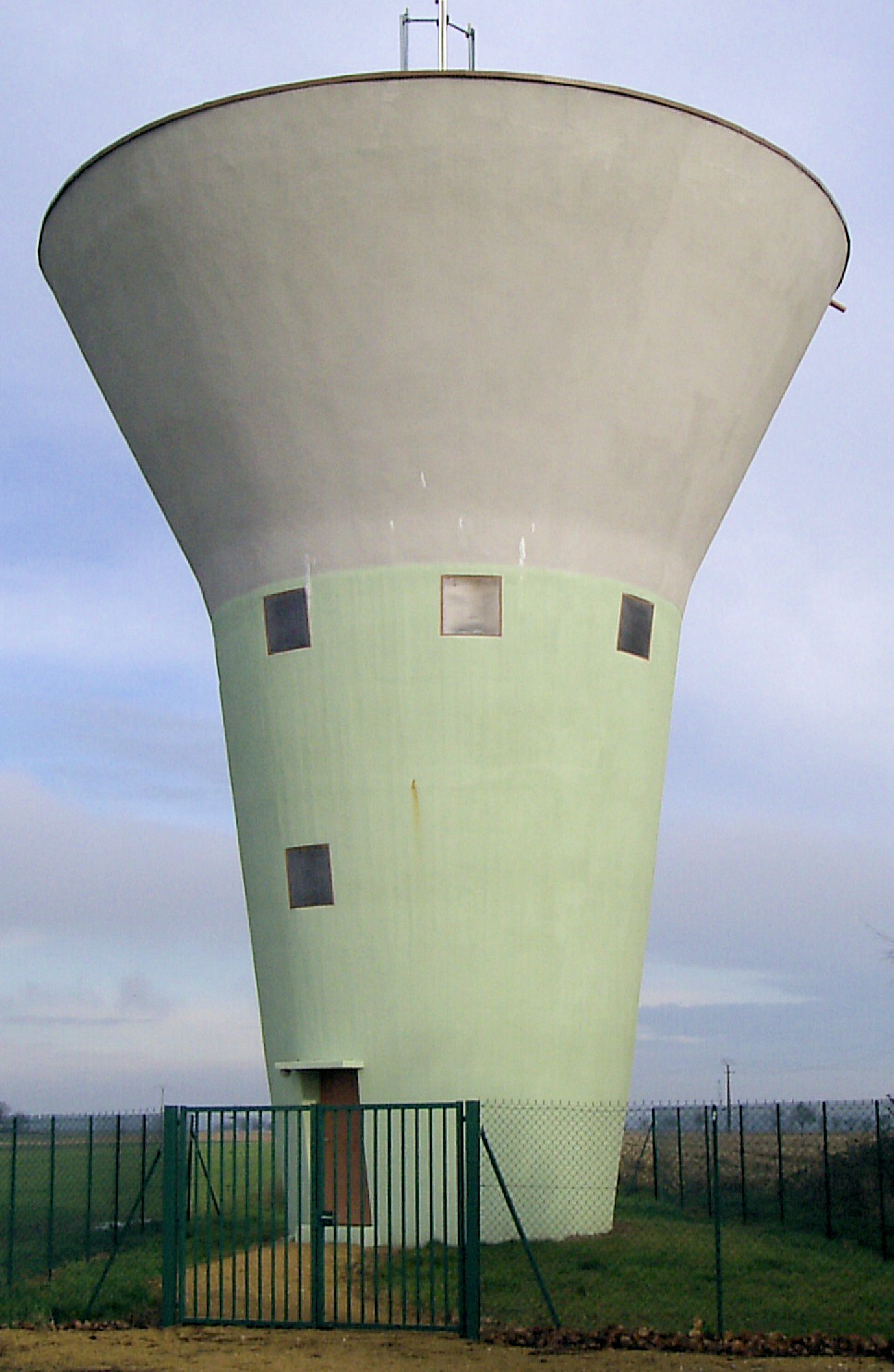
- The water tower in Lixing-lès-Saint-Avold

- Coat of arms
- Location of Lixing-lès-Saint-Avold
- Location within France Location within Grand Est
- Coordinates: 49°02′16″N 6°45′11″E
- Country: France
- Region: Grand Est
- Department: Moselle
- Arrondissement: Forbach-Boulay-Moselle
- Canton: Sarralbe
- Intercommunality: CA Saint-Avold Synergie

Government
  - Mayor (2020–2026): Robert Bintz
- Area^{1}: 6.32 km^{2} (2.44 sq mi)
- Elevation: 329 m (1,079 ft)
- Highest elevation: 321 m (1,053 ft)
- Lowest elevation: 246 m (807 ft)
- Population (2023): 673
  - Density: 106/km^{2} (276/sq mi)
- Time zone: UTC+01:00 (CET)
  - Summer (DST): UTC+02:00 (CEST)
- INSEE/Postal code: 57409 /57660
- ^{1} French Land Register data, which excludes lakes, ponds, glaciers > 1 km^{2} (0.386 sq mi or 247 acres) and river estuaries.

Lixing-lès-Saint-Avold (French pronunciation: [liksɛ̃ lɛ sɛ̃.t‿avɔld], literally Lixing near Saint-Avold; German: Lixingen) is a commune in the Moselle department in Grand Est in north-eastern France.

== See also ==
- Communes of the Moselle department
