= Petit-Tenquin =

- Commune
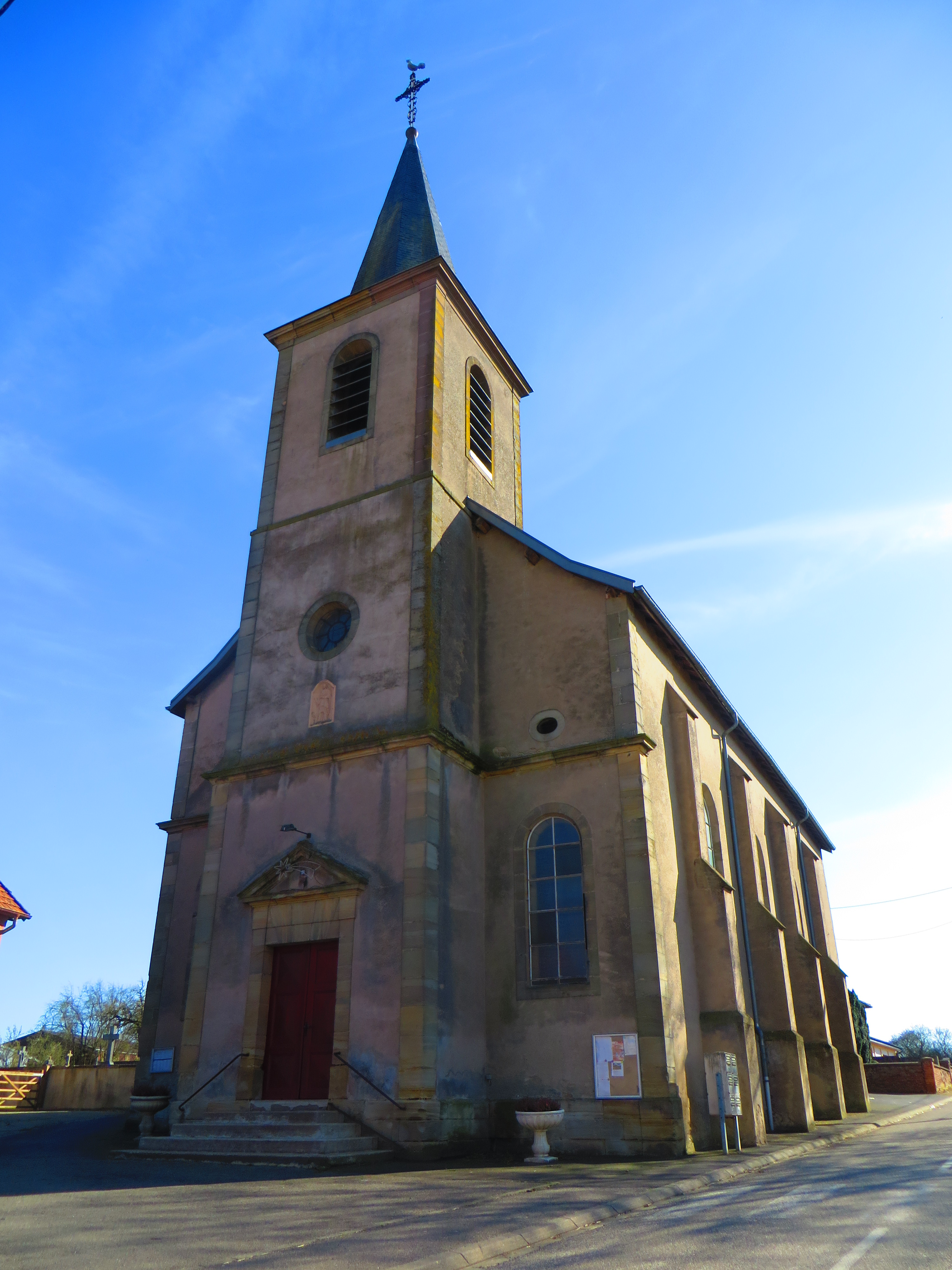
- The church in Petit-Tenquin

- Coat of arms
- Location of Petit-Tenquin
- Location within France Location within Grand Est
- Coordinates: 48°59′22″N 6°51′44″E
- Country: France
- Region: Grand Est
- Department: Moselle
- Arrondissement: Forbach-Boulay-Moselle
- Canton: Sarralbe
- Intercommunality: CA Saint-Avold Synergie

Government
  - Mayor (2020–2026): Vincent Muller
- Area^{1}: 4.88 km^{2} (1.88 sq mi)
- Elevation: 235 m (771 ft)
- Highest elevation: 251 m (823 ft)
- Lowest elevation: 215 m (705 ft)
- Population (2023): 217
  - Density: 44.5/km^{2} (115/sq mi)
- Time zone: UTC+01:00 (CET)
  - Summer (DST): UTC+02:00 (CEST)
- INSEE/Postal code: 57536 /57660
- ^{1} French Land Register data, which excludes lakes, ponds, glaciers > 1 km^{2} (0.386 sq mi or 247 acres) and river estuaries.

Petit-Tenquin (French pronunciation: [pəti tɑ̃kɛ̃]; Lorraine Franconian: Klä-Tenschen/Klän Tensche; German: Kleintänchen) is a commune in the Moselle department in Grand Est in north-eastern France.

== See also ==
- Communes of the Moselle department
