= Destry, Moselle =

Destry
- Commune
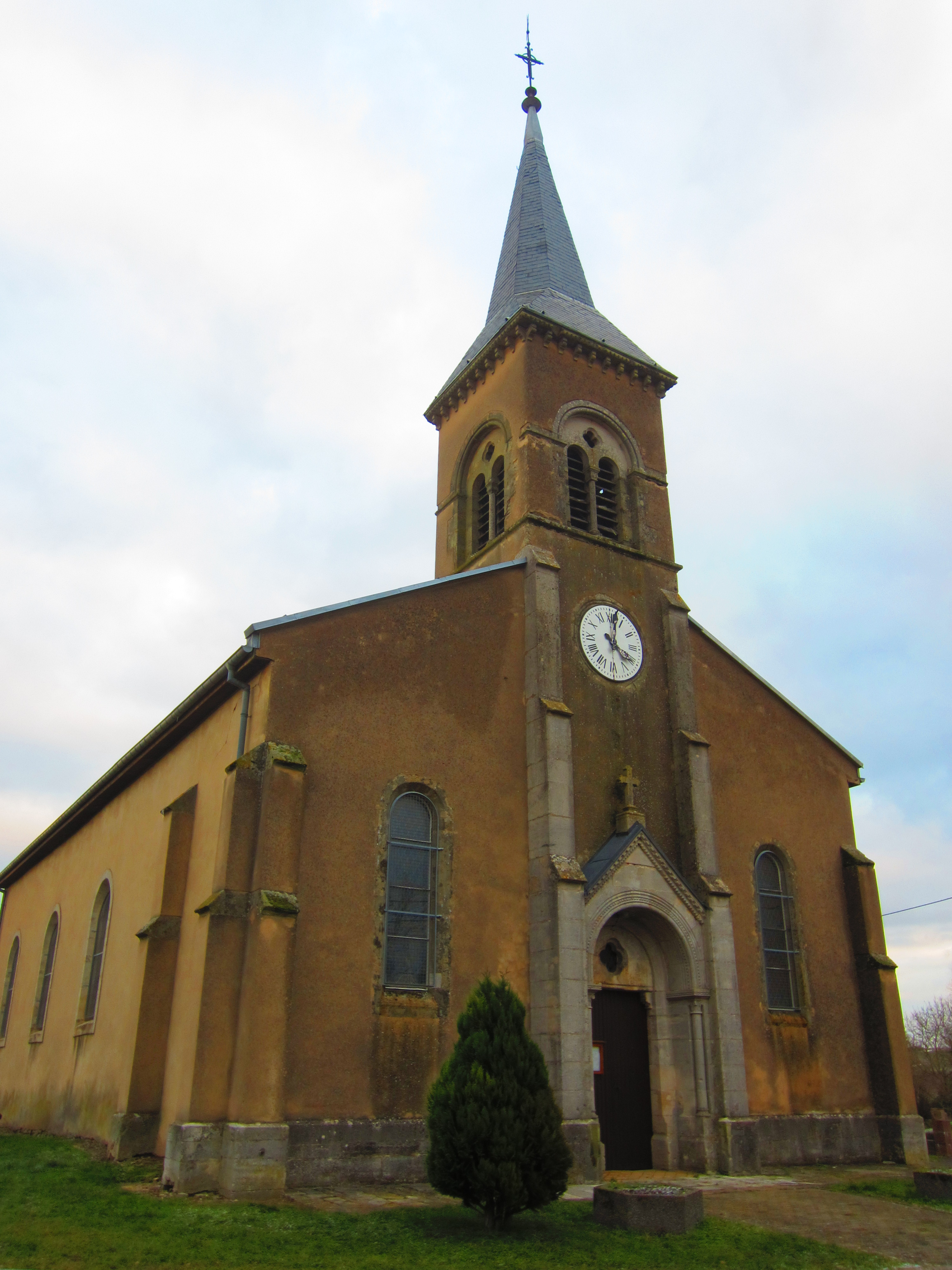
- The church in Destry

- Coat of arms
- Location of Destry
- Location within France Location within Grand Est
- Coordinates: 48°56′40″N 6°35′09″E
- Country: France
- Region: Grand Est
- Department: Moselle
- Arrondissement: Forbach-Boulay-Moselle
- Canton: Sarralbe
- Intercommunality: CA Saint-Avold Synergie

Government
  - Mayor (2020–2026): Philippe Renard
- Area^{1}: 6.93 km^{2} (2.68 sq mi)
- Elevation: 200 m (660 ft)
- Highest elevation: 307 m (1,007 ft)
- Lowest elevation: 237 m (778 ft)
- Population (2023): 115
  - Density: 16.6/km^{2} (43.0/sq mi)
- Time zone: UTC+01:00 (CET)
  - Summer (DST): UTC+02:00 (CEST)
- INSEE/Postal code: 57174 /57340
- ^{1} French Land Register data, which excludes lakes, ponds, glaciers > 1 km^{2} (0.386 sq mi or 247 acres) and river estuaries.

Destry (French pronunciation: [dɛstʁi]; German: Destrich) is a commune in the Moselle department in Grand Est in north-eastern France.

== See also ==
- Communes of the Moselle department
