= Harprich =

- Commune
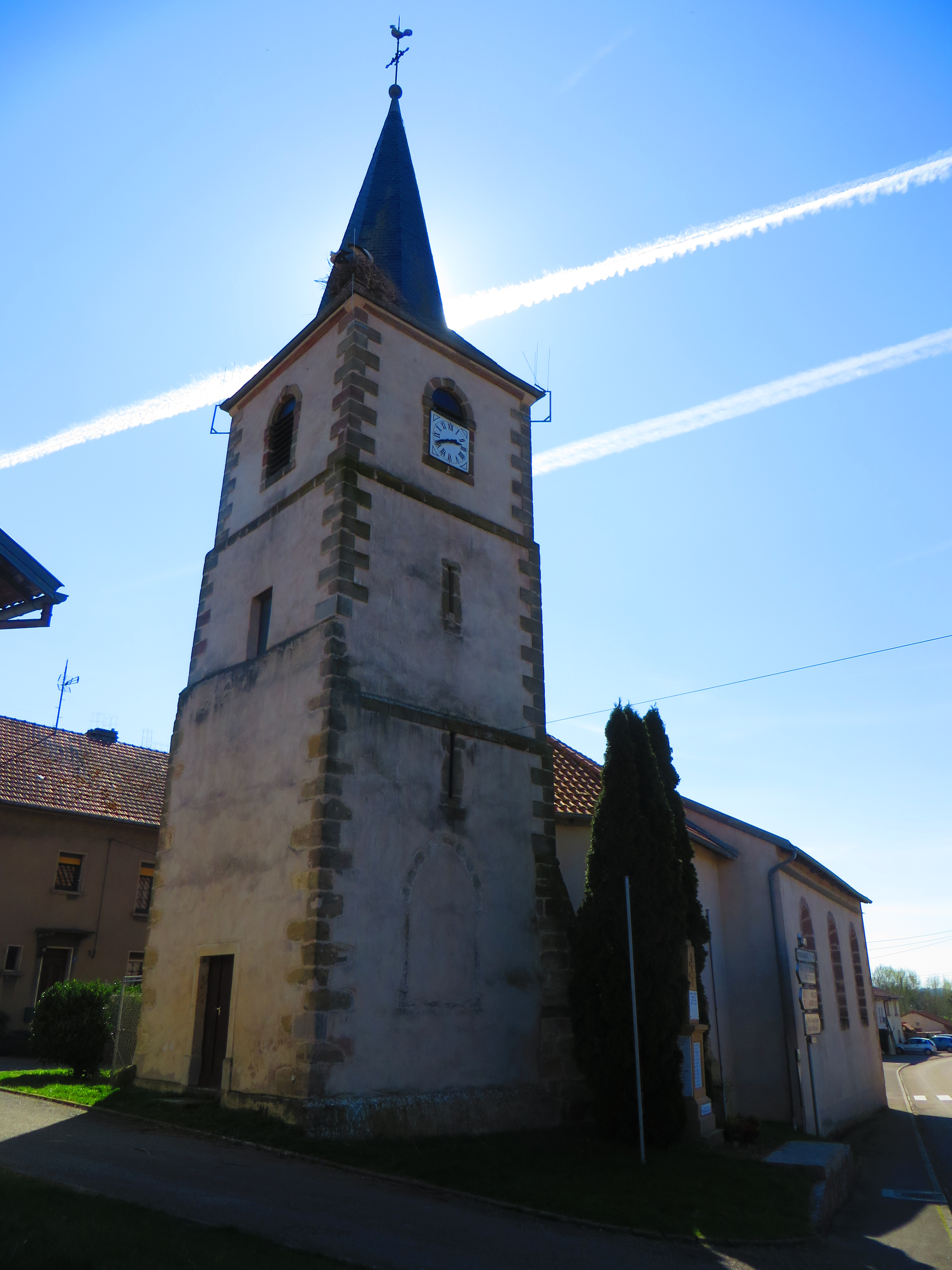
- The church in Harprich

- Coat of arms
- Location of Harprich
- Location within France Location within Grand Est
- Coordinates: 48°57′44″N 6°39′23″E
- Country: France
- Region: Grand Est
- Department: Moselle
- Arrondissement: Forbach-Boulay-Moselle
- Canton: Sarralbe
- Intercommunality: CA Saint-Avold Synergie

Government
  - Mayor (2020–2026): Jean-Paul Adrian
- Area^{1}: 8.78 km^{2} (3.39 sq mi)
- Elevation: 136 m (446 ft)
- Highest elevation: 333 m (1,093 ft)
- Lowest elevation: 242 m (794 ft)
- Population (2023): 183
  - Density: 20.8/km^{2} (54.0/sq mi)
- Time zone: UTC+01:00 (CET)
  - Summer (DST): UTC+02:00 (CEST)
- INSEE/Postal code: 57297 /57340
- ^{1} French Land Register data, which excludes lakes, ponds, glaciers > 1 km^{2} (0.386 sq mi or 247 acres) and river estuaries.

Harprich (French pronunciation: [aʁpʁiʃ]; German: Harprich) is a commune in the Moselle department in Grand Est in north-eastern France.

== See also ==
- Communes of the Moselle department
