= Boustroff =

- Commune
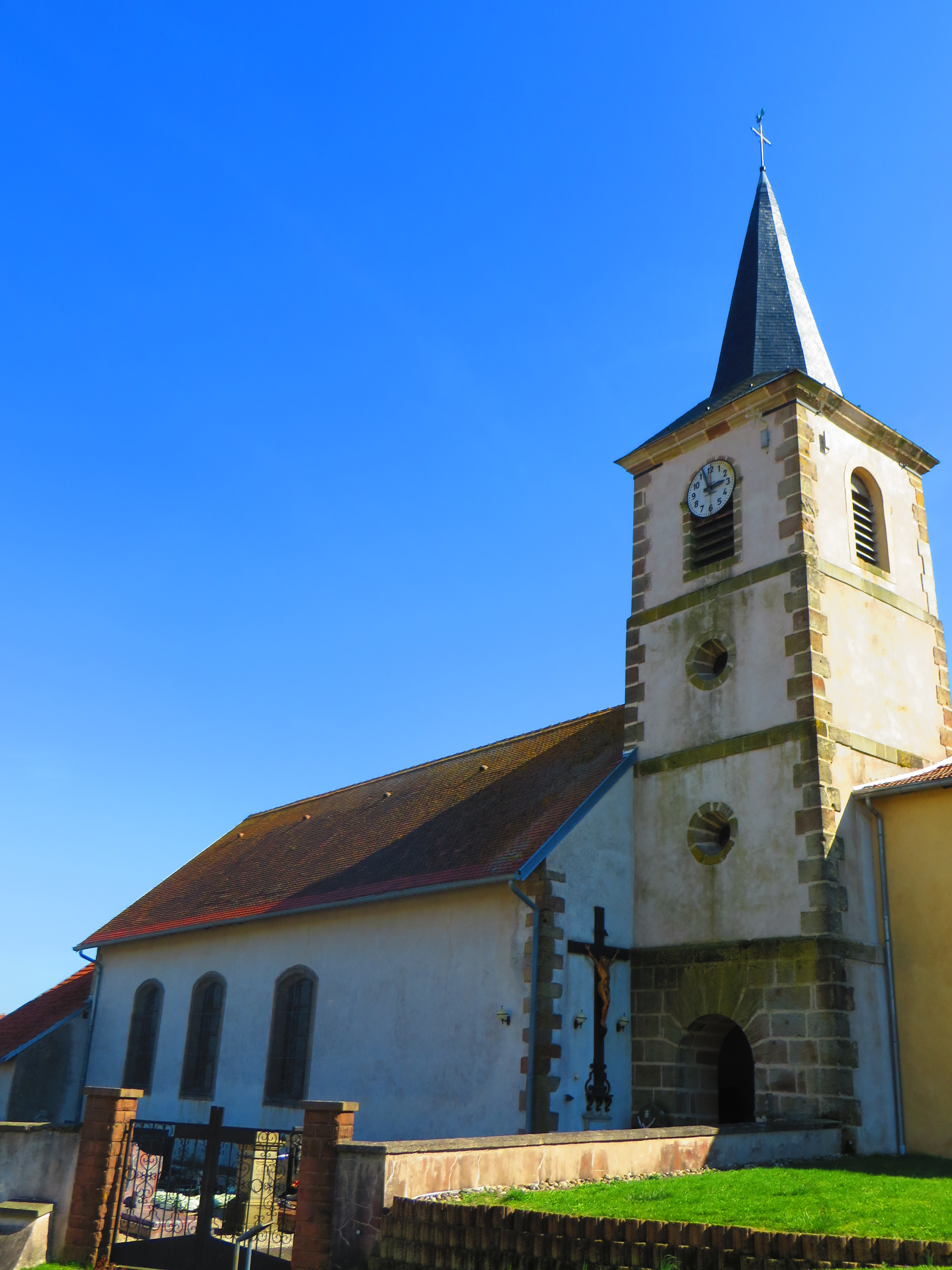
- The church in Boustroff

- Coat of arms
- Location of Boustroff
- Location within France Location within Grand Est
- Coordinates: 49°00′04″N 6°37′20″E
- Country: France
- Region: Grand Est
- Department: Moselle
- Arrondissement: Forbach-Boulay-Moselle
- Canton: Sarralbe
- Intercommunality: CA Saint-Avold Synergie

Government
  - Mayor (2020–2026): Rémy This
- Area^{1}: 3.47 km^{2} (1.34 sq mi)
- Elevation: 200 m (660 ft)
- Highest elevation: 301 m (988 ft)
- Lowest elevation: 254 m (833 ft)
- Population (2023): 152
  - Density: 43.8/km^{2} (113/sq mi)
- Time zone: UTC+01:00 (CET)
  - Summer (DST): UTC+02:00 (CEST)
- INSEE/Postal code: 57105 /57380
- ^{1} French Land Register data, which excludes lakes, ponds, glaciers > 1 km^{2} (0.386 sq mi or 247 acres) and river estuaries.

Boustroff (French pronunciation: [bustʁɔf]; German: Busdorf) is a commune in the Moselle department in Grand Est in northeastern France.

== Populations ==
Historical population
Year	Pop.	±% p.a.
1968	102	—
1975	98	−0.57%
1982	113	+2.06%
1990	125	+1.27%
1999	114	−1.02%
2007	144	+2.96%
2012	156	+1.61%
2017	149	−0.91%
2023	152	+0.33%
Source: INSEE

== See also ==
- Communes of the Moselle department
