= Viller =

- Commune
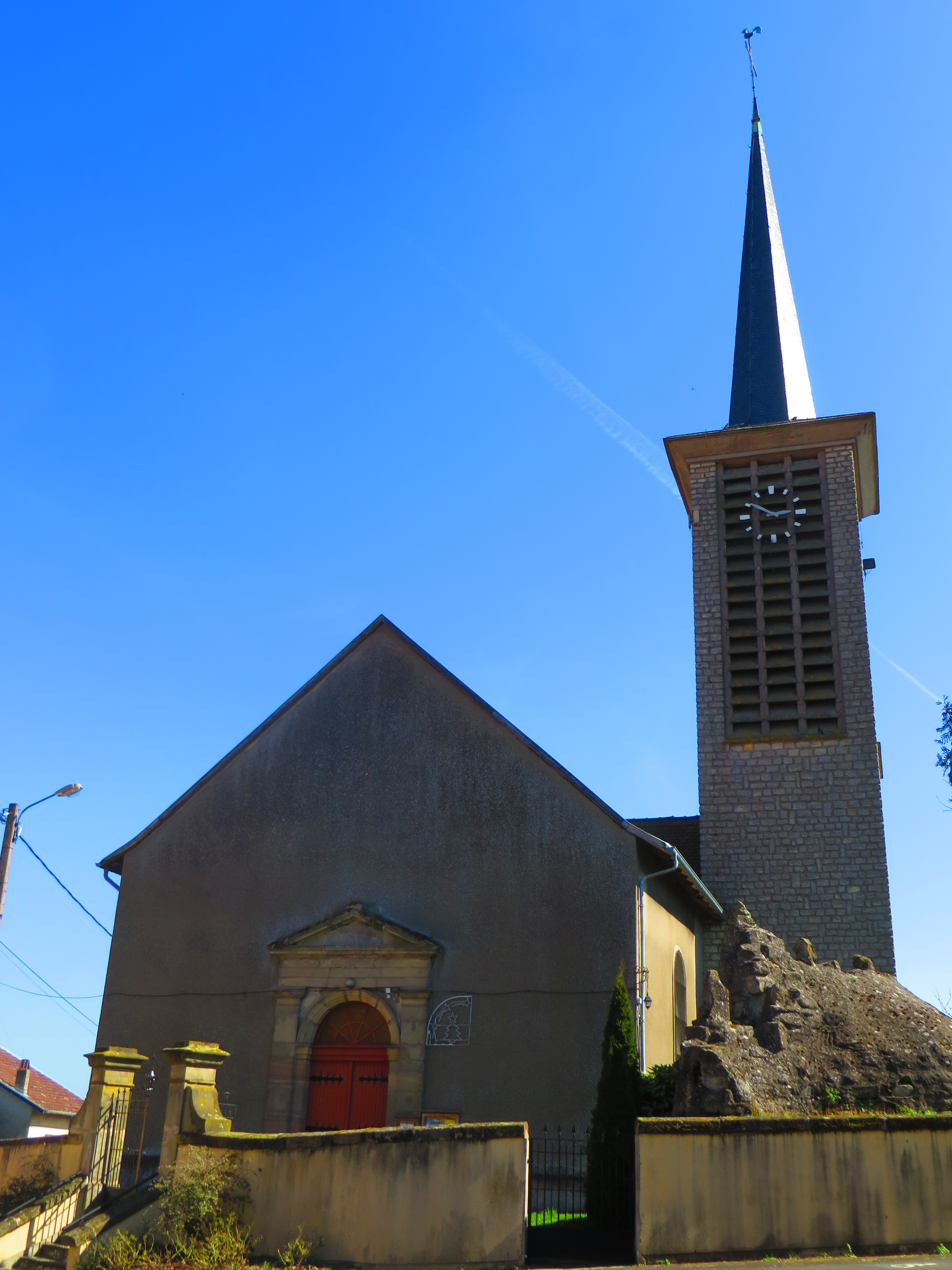
- The church in Viller

- Coat of arms
- Location of Viller
- Location within France Location within Grand Est
- Coordinates: 48°59′08″N 6°38′49″E
- Country: France
- Region: Grand Est
- Department: Moselle
- Arrondissement: Forbach-Boulay-Moselle
- Canton: Sarralbe
- Intercommunality: CA Saint-Avold Synergie

Government
  - Mayor (2020–2026): Cédric Muller
- Area^{1}: 7.27 km^{2} (2.81 sq mi)
- Elevation: 273 m (896 ft)
- Highest elevation: 331 m (1,086 ft)
- Lowest elevation: 251 m (823 ft)
- Population (2023): 176
  - Density: 24.2/km^{2} (62.7/sq mi)
- Time zone: UTC+01:00 (CET)
  - Summer (DST): UTC+02:00 (CEST)
- INSEE/Postal code: 57717 /57340
- ^{1} French Land Register data, which excludes lakes, ponds, glaciers > 1 km^{2} (0.386 sq mi or 247 acres) and river estuaries.

Viller (Lorraine Franconian Willer) is a commune in the Moselle department in Grand Est in north-eastern France.

== See also ==
- Communes of the Moselle department
