= Biding =

- Commune
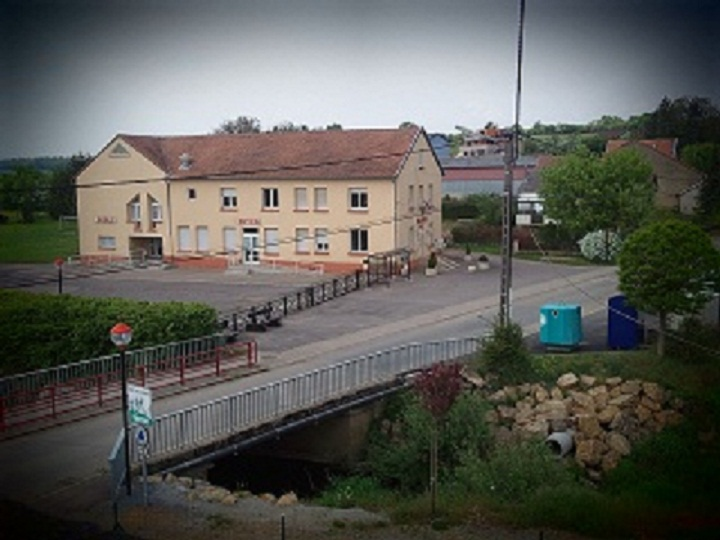
- The town hall and school in Biding

- Coat of arms
- Location of Biding
- Location within France Location within Grand Est
- Coordinates: 49°03′34″N 6°47′15″E
- Country: France
- Region: Grand Est
- Department: Moselle
- Arrondissement: Forbach-Boulay-Moselle
- Canton: Sarralbe
- Intercommunality: CA Saint-Avold Synergie

Government
  - Mayor (2020–2026): Christophe Bado
- Area^{1}: 6.72 km^{2} (2.59 sq mi)
- Elevation: 270 m (890 ft)
- Highest elevation: 296 m (971 ft)
- Lowest elevation: 251 m (823 ft)
- Population (2023): 338
  - Density: 50.3/km^{2} (130/sq mi)
- Time zone: UTC+01:00 (CET)
  - Summer (DST): UTC+02:00 (CEST)
- INSEE/Postal code: 57082 /57660
- ^{1} French Land Register data, which excludes lakes, ponds, glaciers > 1 km^{2} (0.386 sq mi or 247 acres) and river estuaries.

Biding (French pronunciation: [bidɛ̃]; German: Biedingen) is a commune in the Moselle department in Grand Est in northeastern France.

== Population ==
Historical population
| Year | Pop. | ±% p.a. |
|---|---|---|
| 1968 | 186 | — |
| 1975 | 168 | −1.44% |
| 1982 | 225 | +4.26% |
| 1990 | 284 | +2.95% |
| 1999 | 315 | +1.16% |
| 2007 | 322 | +0.28% |
| 2012 | 305 | −1.08% |
| 2017 | 324 | +1.22% |
| 2023 | 338 | +0.71% |
Source: INSEE

== See also ==
- Communes of the Moselle department
