= Vahl-Ebersing =

- Commune
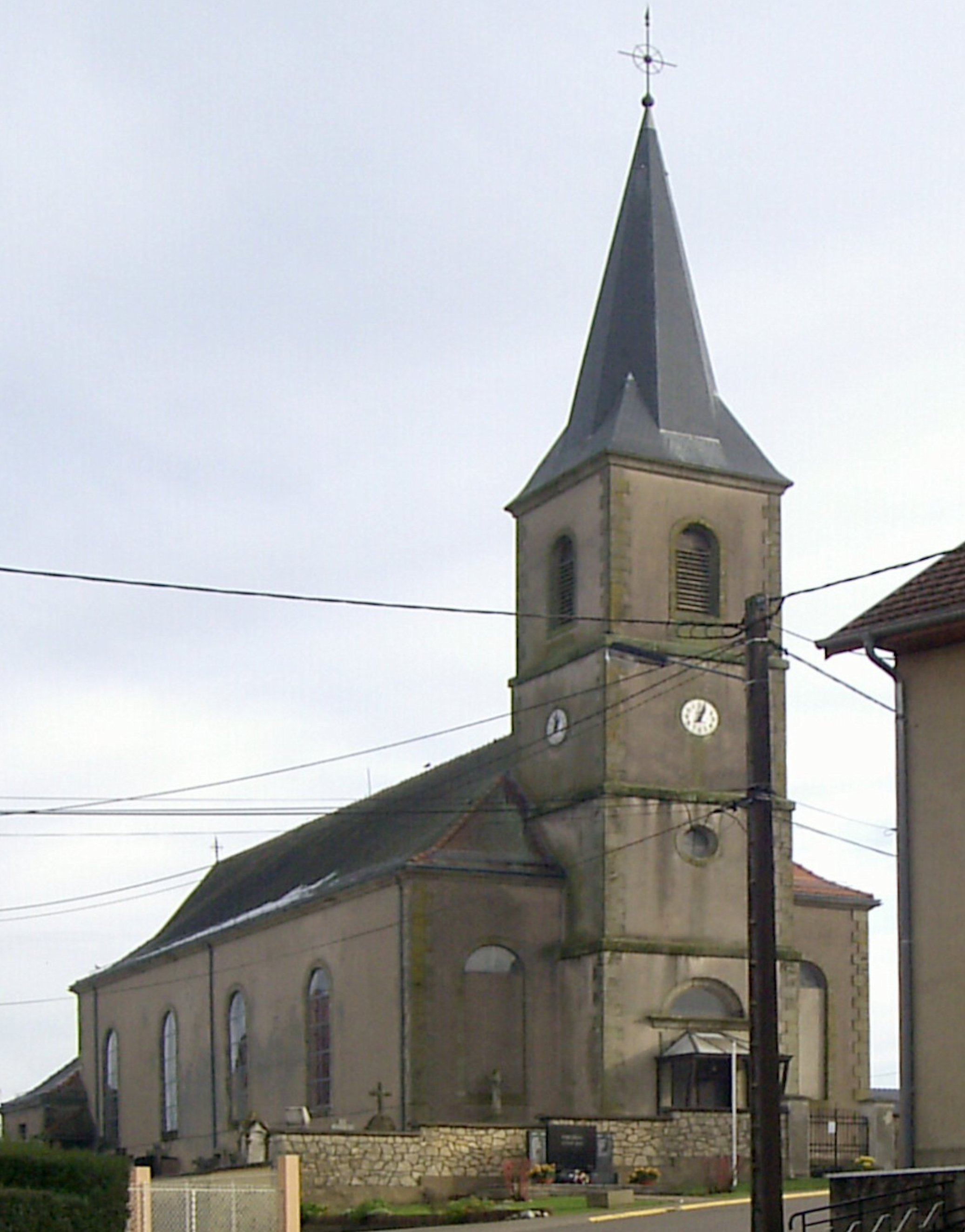
- The church in Vahl-Ebersing

- Coat of arms
- Location of Vahl-Ebersing
- Location within France Location within Grand Est
- Coordinates: 49°03′02″N 6°45′15″E
- Country: France
- Region: Grand Est
- Department: Moselle
- Arrondissement: Forbach-Boulay-Moselle
- Canton: Sarralbe
- Intercommunality: CA Saint-Avold Synergie

Government
  - Mayor (2020–2026): Antoine Franke
- Area^{1}: 6.29 km^{2} (2.43 sq mi)
- Elevation: 320 m (1,050 ft)
- Highest elevation: 323 m (1,060 ft)
- Lowest elevation: 249 m (817 ft)
- Population (2023): 487
  - Density: 77.4/km^{2} (201/sq mi)
- Time zone: UTC+01:00 (CET)
  - Summer (DST): UTC+02:00 (CEST)
- INSEE/Postal code: 57684 /57660
- ^{1} French Land Register data, which excludes lakes, ponds, glaciers > 1 km^{2} (0.386 sq mi or 247 acres) and river estuaries.

Vahl-Ebersing (French pronunciation: [val ebɛʁsɛ̃]) is a commune in the Moselle department in Grand Est in north-eastern France.

== See also ==
- Communes of the Moselle department
