= Vallerange =

- Commune
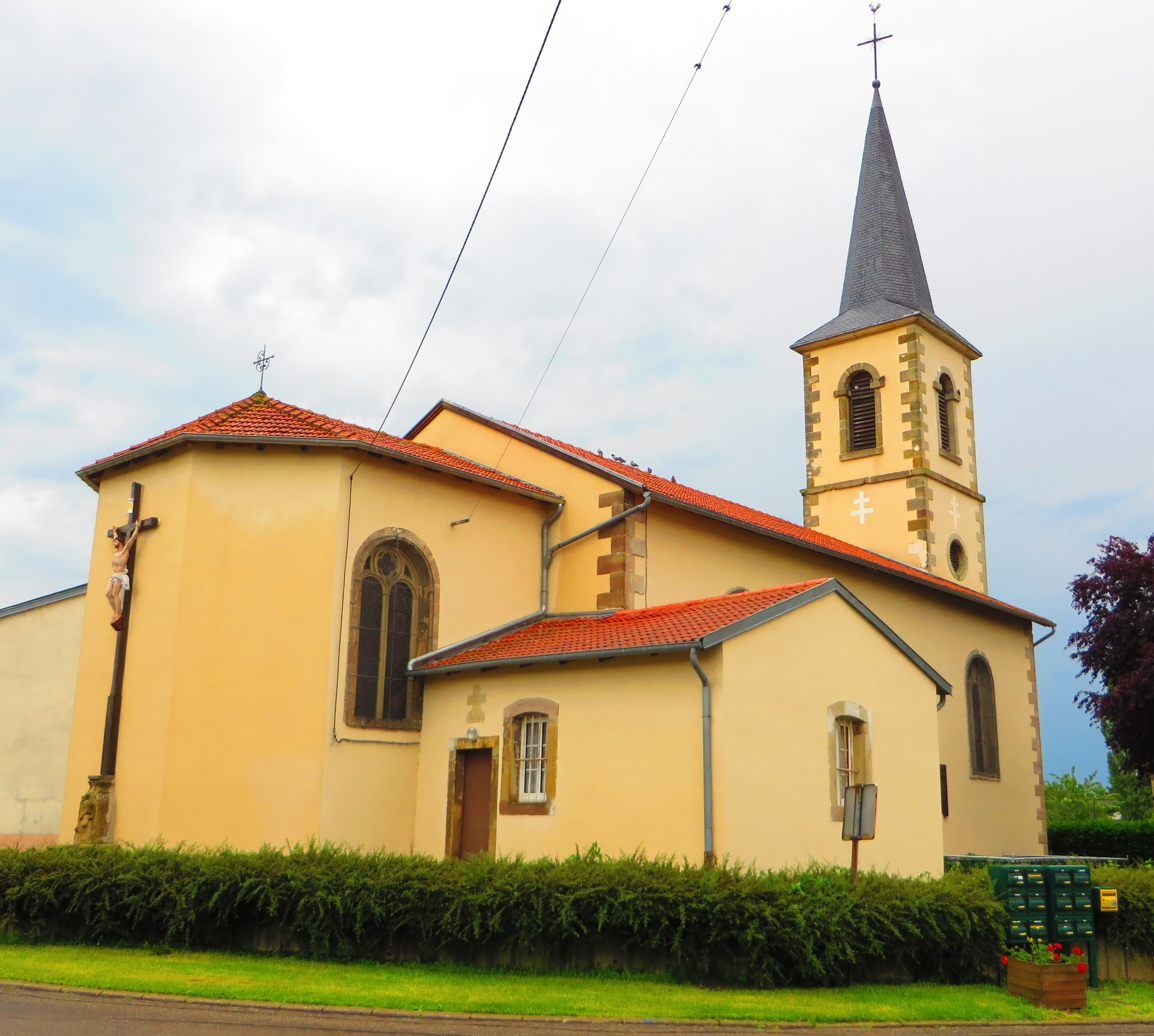
- The church in Vallerange

- Coat of arms
- Location of Vallerange
- Location within France Location within Grand Est
- Coordinates: 48°57′03″N 6°41′11″E
- Country: France
- Region: Grand Est
- Department: Moselle
- Arrondissement: Forbach-Boulay-Moselle
- Canton: Sarralbe
- Intercommunality: CA Saint-Avold Synergie

Government
  - Mayor (2020–2026): Roger Pierson
- Area^{1}: 6.64 km^{2} (2.56 sq mi)
- Elevation: 268 m (879 ft)
- Highest elevation: 295 m (968 ft)
- Lowest elevation: 236 m (774 ft)
- Population (2023): 211
  - Density: 31.8/km^{2} (82.3/sq mi)
- Time zone: UTC+01:00 (CET)
  - Summer (DST): UTC+02:00 (CEST)
- INSEE/Postal code: 57687 /57340
- ^{1} French Land Register data, which excludes lakes, ponds, glaciers > 1 km^{2} (0.386 sq mi or 247 acres) and river estuaries.

Vallerange (French pronunciation: [valʁɑ̃ʒ]; German: Walleringen) is a commune in the Moselle department in Grand Est in north-eastern France.

== See also ==
- Communes of the Moselle department
