= Eincheville =

- Commune
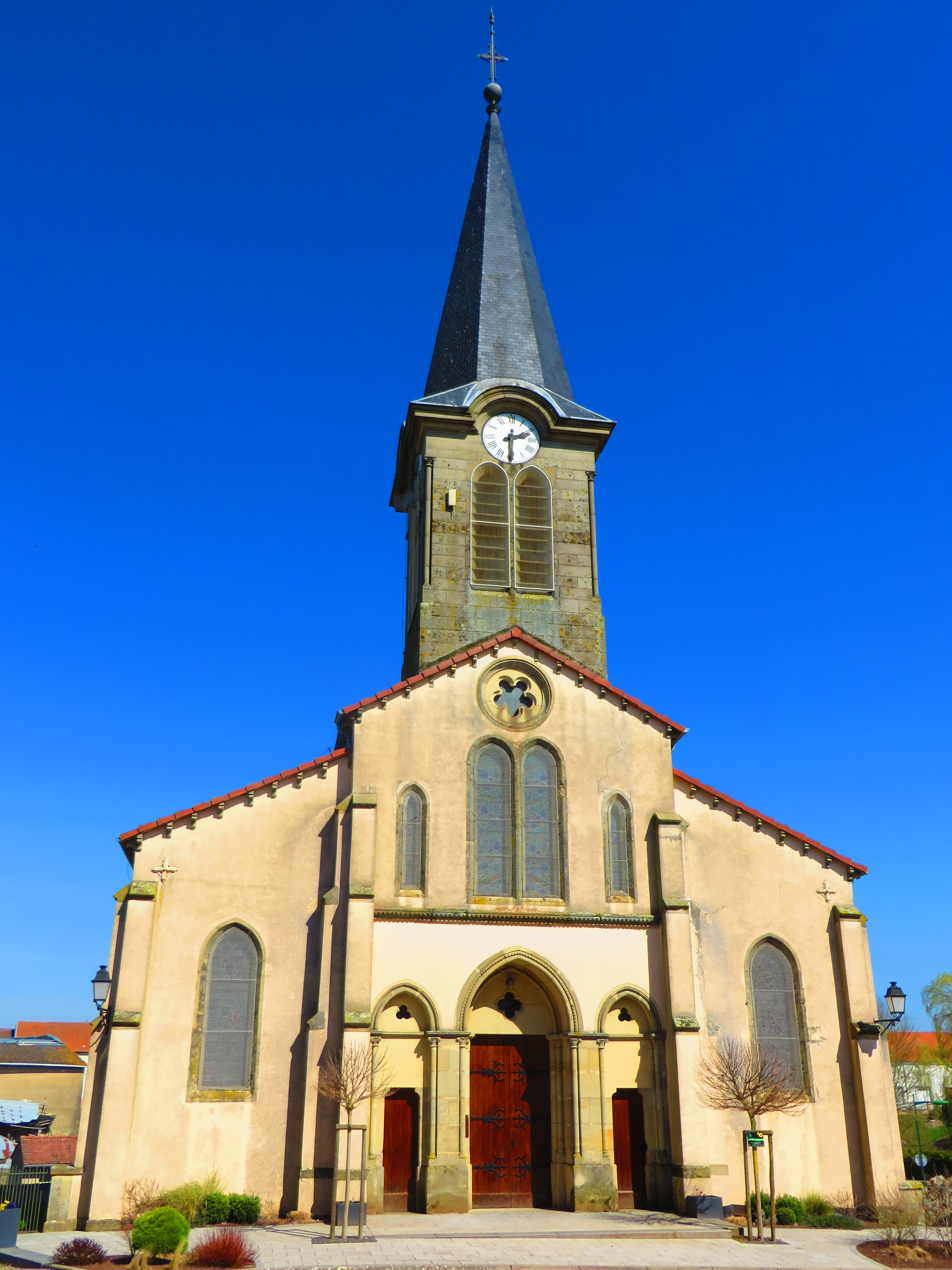
- The church in Eincheville

- Coat of arms
- Location of Eincheville
- Location within France Location within Grand Est
- Coordinates: 48°59′01″N 6°36′20″E
- Country: France
- Region: Grand Est
- Department: Moselle
- Arrondissement: Forbach-Boulay-Moselle
- Canton: Sarralbe
- Intercommunality: CA Saint-Avold Synergie

Government
  - Mayor (2020–2026): Julien Claiser
- Area^{1}: 6.78 km^{2} (2.62 sq mi)
- Elevation: 250 m (820 ft)
- Highest elevation: 312 m (1,024 ft)
- Lowest elevation: 249 m (817 ft)
- Population (2023): 216
  - Density: 31.9/km^{2} (82.5/sq mi)
- Time zone: UTC+01:00 (CET)
  - Summer (DST): UTC+02:00 (CEST)
- INSEE/Postal code: 57189 /57340
- ^{1} French Land Register data, which excludes lakes, ponds, glaciers > 1 km^{2} (0.386 sq mi or 247 acres) and river estuaries.

Eincheville (French pronunciation: [ɛ̃ʃvil]; Lorraine Franconian Enschwiller/Äschwiller; German: Enschweiler) is a commune in the Moselle department in Grand Est in north-eastern France.

== See also ==
- Communes of the Moselle department
