= Bistroff =

- Commune
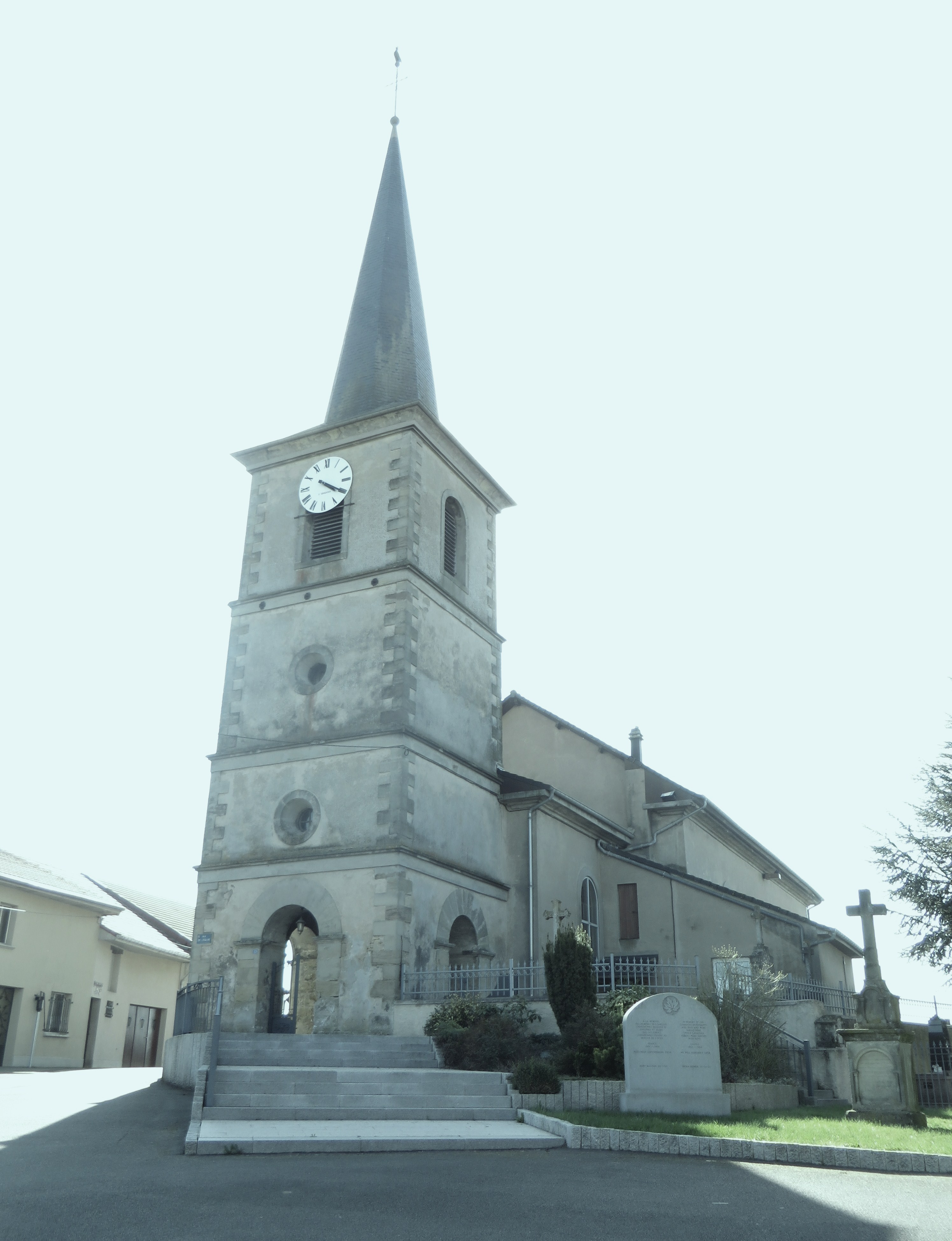
- The church in Bistroff

- Coat of arms
- Location of Bistroff
- Location within France Location within Grand Est
- Coordinates: 48°59′34″N 6°42′53″E
- Country: France
- Region: Grand Est
- Department: Moselle
- Arrondissement: Forbach-Boulay-Moselle
- Canton: Sarralbe
- Intercommunality: CA Saint-Avold Synergie

Government
  - Mayor (2020–2026): Jean Delles
- Area^{1}: 19.28 km^{2} (7.44 sq mi)
- Elevation: 330 m (1,080 ft)
- Highest elevation: 315 m (1,033 ft)
- Lowest elevation: 245 m (804 ft)
- Population (2023): 319
  - Density: 16.5/km^{2} (42.9/sq mi)
- Time zone: UTC+01:00 (CET)
  - Summer (DST): UTC+02:00 (CEST)
- INSEE/Postal code: 57088 /57660
- ^{1} French Land Register data, which excludes lakes, ponds, glaciers > 1 km^{2} (0.386 sq mi or 247 acres) and river estuaries.

Bistroff (French pronunciation: [bistʁɔf]; German: Bischdorf) is a commune in the Moselle department in Grand Est in northeastern France.

== Population ==
Historical population
Year	Pop.	±% p.a.
1968	294	—
1975	273	−1.05%
1982	268	−0.26%
1990	276	+0.37%
1999	299	+0.89%
2007	336	+1.47%
2012	324	−0.72%
2017	311	−0.82%
2023	319	+0.42%
Source: INSEE

== See also ==
- Communes of the Moselle department
