= Diffembach-lès-Hellimer =

- Commune
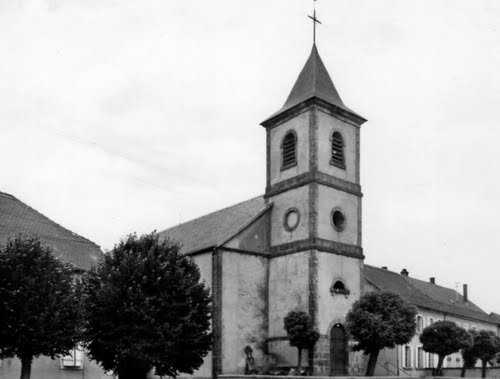
- The church in Diffembach-lès-Hellimer

- Coat of arms
- Location of Diffembach-lès-Hellimer
- Location within France Location within Grand Est
- Coordinates: 49°00′12″N 6°50′33″E
- Country: France
- Region: Grand Est
- Department: Moselle
- Arrondissement: Forbach-Boulay-Moselle
- Canton: Sarralbe
- Intercommunality: CA Saint-Avold Synergie

Government
  - Mayor (2020–2026): Suzanne Busdon
- Area^{1}: 5.79 km^{2} (2.24 sq mi)
- Elevation: 225 m (738 ft)
- Highest elevation: 265 m (869 ft)
- Lowest elevation: 216 m (709 ft)
- Population (2023): 359
  - Density: 62.0/km^{2} (161/sq mi)
- Time zone: UTC+01:00 (CET)
  - Summer (DST): UTC+02:00 (CEST)
- INSEE/Postal code: 57178 /57660
- ^{1} French Land Register data, which excludes lakes, ponds, glaciers > 1 km^{2} (0.386 sq mi or 247 acres) and river estuaries.

Diffembach-lès-Hellimer (German: Diefenbach bei Hellimer) is a commune in the Moselle department in Grand Est in north-eastern France.

== See also ==
- Communes of the Moselle department
