= Landroff =

- Commune
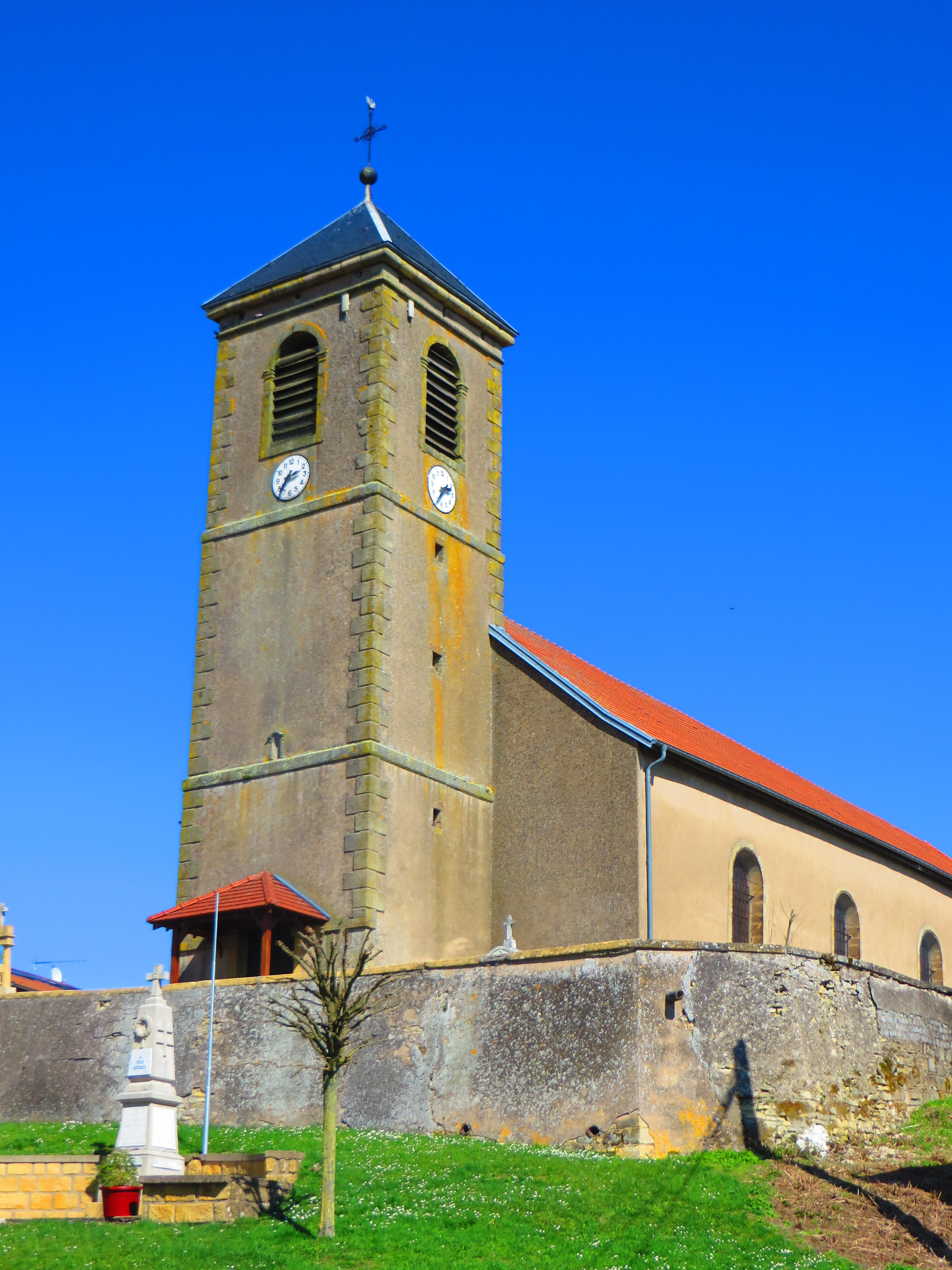
- The church in Landroff

- Coat of arms
- Location of Landroff
- Location within France Location within Grand Est
- Coordinates: 48°58′05″N 6°36′43″E
- Country: France
- Region: Grand Est
- Department: Moselle
- Arrondissement: Forbach-Boulay-Moselle
- Canton: Sarralbe
- Intercommunality: CA Saint-Avold Synergie

Government
  - Mayor (2020–2026): Sébastien Maret
- Area^{1}: 7.73 km^{2} (2.98 sq mi)
- Elevation: 245 m (804 ft)
- Highest elevation: 305 m (1,001 ft)
- Lowest elevation: 238 m (781 ft)
- Population (2023): 259
  - Density: 33.5/km^{2} (86.8/sq mi)
- Time zone: UTC+01:00 (CET)
  - Summer (DST): UTC+02:00 (CEST)
- INSEE/Postal code: 57379 /57340
- ^{1} French Land Register data, which excludes lakes, ponds, glaciers > 1 km^{2} (0.386 sq mi or 247 acres) and river estuaries.

Landroff (French pronunciation: [lɑ̃dʁɔf]; German: Landorf) is a commune in the Moselle department in Grand Est in north-eastern France.

== Historical significance ==
Landroff was the site of a sharp but brief battle during World War II on 14–15 November 1944 between elements of the U.S. 6th Armored Division and the German 36th Volksgrenadier Division led by the 87th Grenadier Regiment. Elements of the U.S. 68th Tank Battalion liberated the town on 14 November. Beginning that evening at 1800, the 68th repulsed the first of four increasingly violent and determined German counterattacks. The others followed at 2100, 2300, and finally at 0130 on 15 November. B Company, 44th Armored Infantry Battalion reinforced the 68th after the second counterattack. During the final counterattack German forces cut the road to the west of the town and, in the darkness, infiltrated into Landroff proper, where the battle devolved into a hand-to-hand melee that lasted until dawn.

For his role in organizing the defense of the town, the 68th Tank Battalion's S-3 (Operations Officer), Captain Daniel E. Smith, was awarded the Distinguished Service Cross. Technical Sergeant Herbert S. Latimer, B Company, 44th Armored Infantry Battalion was also awarded the Distinguished Service Cross for heroism and gallantry in action for leading his platoon when all senior officers and sergeants of the platoon were either killed or wounded.

A Company, 68th Tank Battalion was awarded the Presidential Unit Citation for its actions in defending the town.

== See also ==
- Communes of the Moselle department
