= Maxstadt =

- Commune
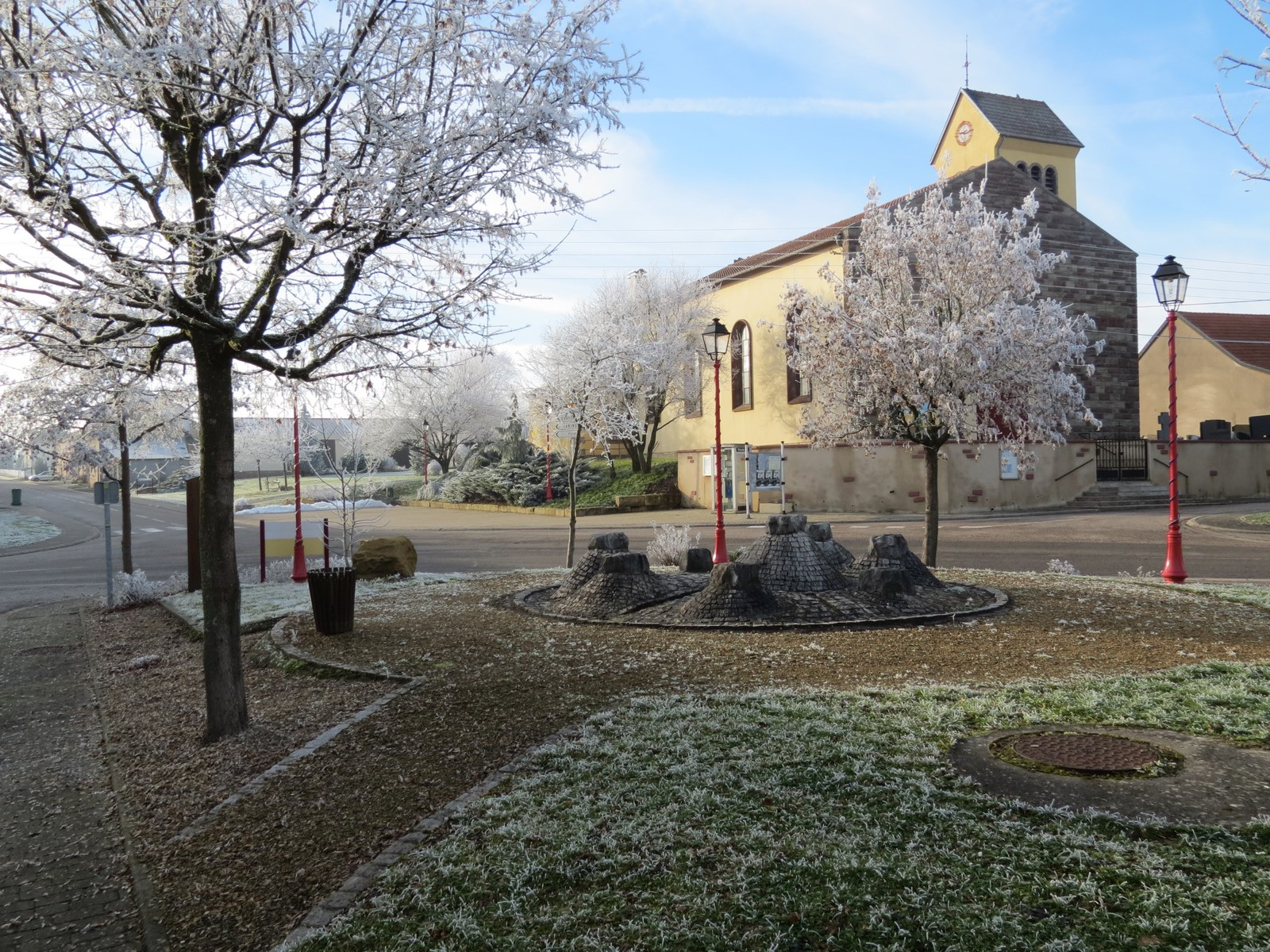
- The centre of Maxstadt

- Coat of arms
- Location of Maxstadt
- Location within France Location within Grand Est
- Coordinates: 49°02′42″N 6°47′39″E
- Country: France
- Region: Grand Est
- Department: Moselle
- Arrondissement: Forbach-Boulay-Moselle
- Canton: Sarralbe
- Intercommunality: CA Saint-Avold Synergie

Government
  - Mayor (2020–2026): Sébastien Lang
- Area^{1}: 7.91 km^{2} (3.05 sq mi)
- Elevation: 275 m (902 ft)
- Highest elevation: 308 m (1,010 ft)
- Lowest elevation: 259 m (850 ft)
- Population (2023): 297
  - Density: 37.5/km^{2} (97.2/sq mi)
- Time zone: UTC+01:00 (CET)
  - Summer (DST): UTC+02:00 (CEST)
- INSEE/Postal code: 57453 /57660
- ^{1} French Land Register data, which excludes lakes, ponds, glaciers > 1 km^{2} (0.386 sq mi or 247 acres) and river estuaries.

Maxstadt (French pronunciation: [makʃtat]) is a commune in the Moselle department in Grand Est in north-eastern France.

== See also ==
- Communes of the Moselle department
