= Laning =

- Commune
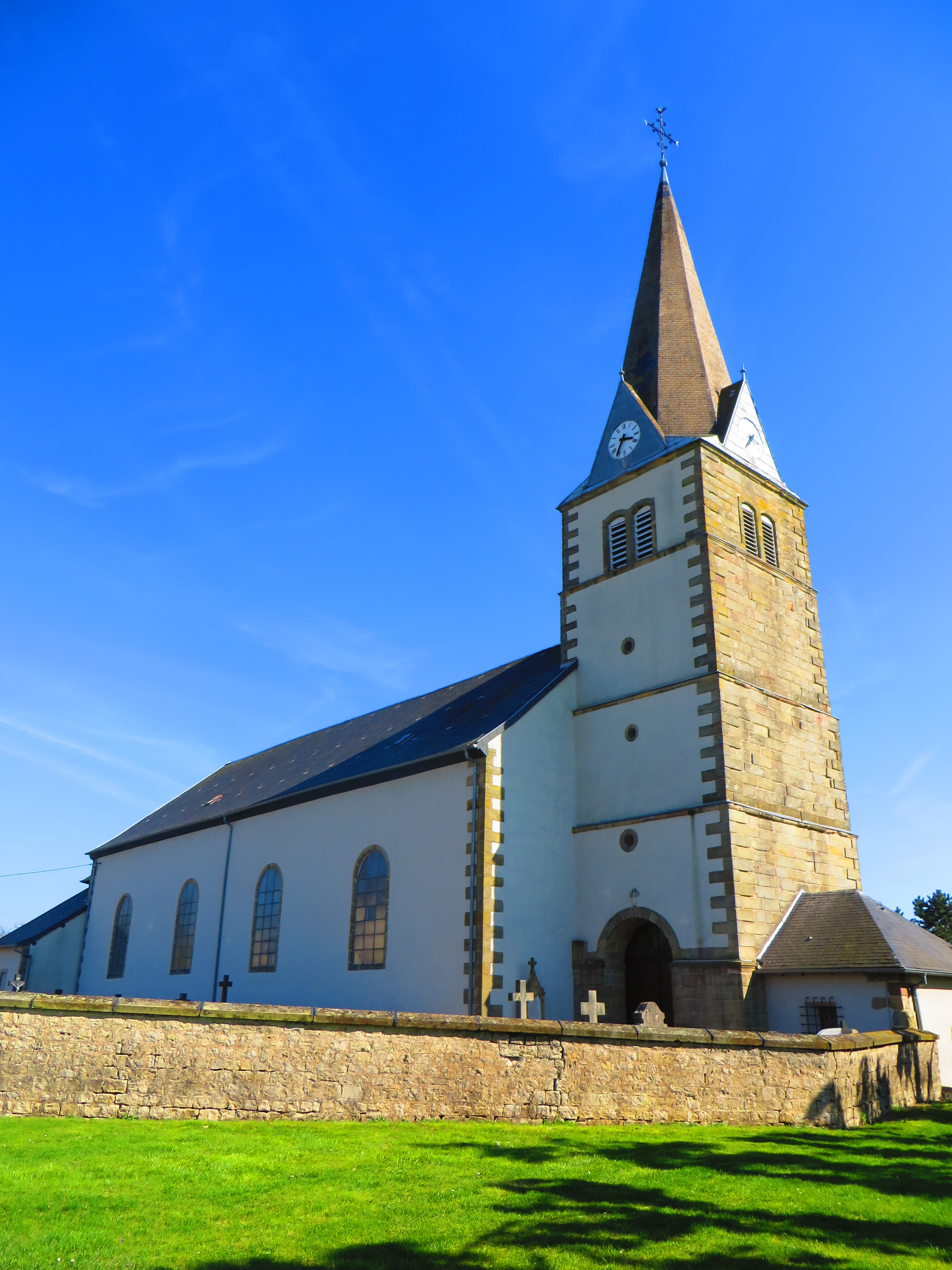
- The church in Laning

- Coat of arms
- Location of Laning
- Location within France Location within Grand Est
- Coordinates: 49°02′09″N 6°46′34″E
- Country: France
- Region: Grand Est
- Department: Moselle
- Arrondissement: Forbach-Boulay-Moselle
- Canton: Sarralbe
- Intercommunality: CA Saint-Avold Synergie

Government
  - Mayor (2020–2026): Dominique Gross
- Area^{1}: 6.71 km^{2} (2.59 sq mi)
- Elevation: 300 m (980 ft)
- Highest elevation: 331 m (1,086 ft)
- Lowest elevation: 248 m (814 ft)
- Population (2023): 579
  - Density: 86.3/km^{2} (223/sq mi)
- Time zone: UTC+01:00 (CET)
  - Summer (DST): UTC+02:00 (CEST)
- INSEE/Postal code: 57384 /57660
- ^{1} French Land Register data, which excludes lakes, ponds, glaciers > 1 km^{2} (0.386 sq mi or 247 acres) and river estuaries.

Laning (French pronunciation: [lanɛ̃]; German: Lanningen) is a commune in the Moselle department in Grand Est in north-eastern France.

== See also ==
- Communes of the Moselle department
