= Gréning =

- Commune
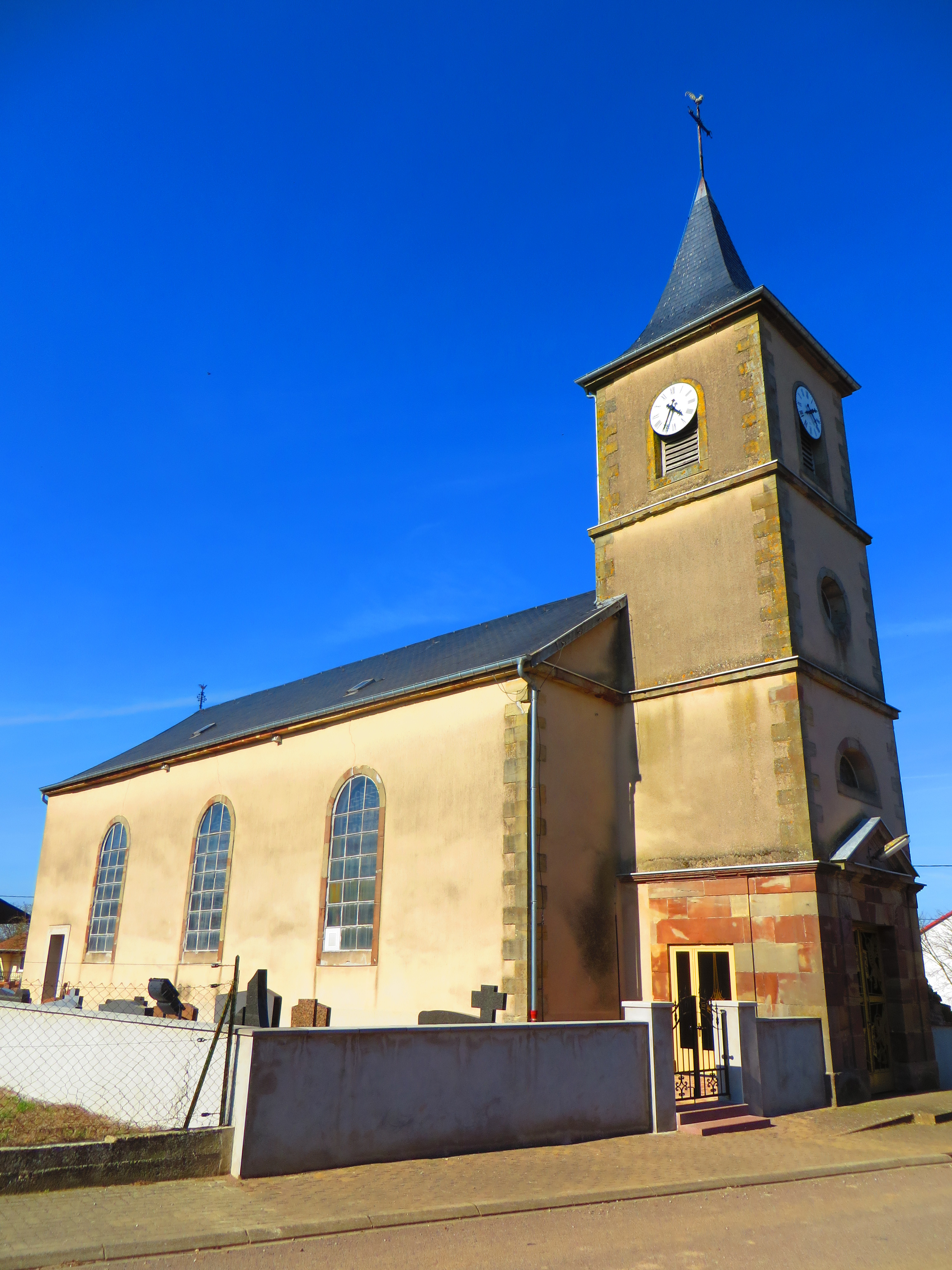
- The church in Gréning

- Coat of arms
- Location of Gréning
- Location within France Location within Grand Est
- Coordinates: 48°58′22″N 6°50′39″E
- Country: France
- Region: Grand Est
- Department: Moselle
- Arrondissement: Forbach-Boulay-Moselle
- Canton: Sarralbe
- Intercommunality: CA Saint-Avold Synergie

Government
  - Mayor (2020–2026): Roland Imhoff
- Area^{1}: 2.78 km^{2} (1.07 sq mi)
- Elevation: 210 m (690 ft)
- Highest elevation: 250 m (820 ft)
- Lowest elevation: 220 m (720 ft)
- Population (2023): 113
  - Density: 40.6/km^{2} (105/sq mi)
- Time zone: UTC+01:00 (CET)
  - Summer (DST): UTC+02:00 (CEST)
- INSEE/Postal code: 57258 /57660
- ^{1} French Land Register data, which excludes lakes, ponds, glaciers > 1 km^{2} (0.386 sq mi or 247 acres) and river estuaries.

Gréning (French pronunciation: [ɡʁenɛ̃]; German: Greningen; Lorraine Franconian: Greninge/Grininge) is a commune in the Moselle department in Grand Est in north-eastern France.

== See also ==
- Communes of the Moselle department
