= Racrange =

- Commune
- Coat of arms
- Location of Racrange
- Location within France Location within Grand Est
- Coordinates: 48°55′25″N 6°40′27″E
- Country: France
- Region: Grand Est
- Department: Moselle
- Arrondissement: Forbach-Boulay-Moselle
- Canton: Sarralbe
- Intercommunality: CA Saint-Avold Synergie

Government
  - Mayor (2020–2026): Laurent Ménière
- Area^{1}: 7.16 km^{2} (2.76 sq mi)
- Elevation: 328 m (1,076 ft)
- Highest elevation: 283 m (928 ft)
- Lowest elevation: 229 m (751 ft)
- Population (2023): 621
  - Density: 86.7/km^{2} (225/sq mi)
- Time zone: UTC+01:00 (CET)
  - Summer (DST): UTC+02:00 (CEST)
- INSEE/Postal code: 57560 /57340
- ^{1} French Land Register data, which excludes lakes, ponds, glaciers > 1 km^{2} (0.386 sq mi or 247 acres) and river estuaries.

Racrange (French pronunciation: [ʁakʁɑ̃ʒ]; German: Rakringen; Lorraine Franconian Rakringe) is a commune in the Moselle department in Grand Est in north-eastern France.

== Population ==
Historical population
| Year | Pop. | ±% p.a. |
|---|---|---|
| 1968 | 528 | — |
| 1975 | 600 | +1.84% |
| 1982 | 543 | −1.42% |
| 1990 | 570 | +0.61% |
| 1999 | 599 | +0.55% |
| 2007 | 672 | +1.45% |
| 2012 | 619 | −1.63% |
| 2017 | 605 | −0.46% |
| 2023 | 621 | +0.44% |
Source: INSEE

== See also ==
- Communes of the Moselle department
