= Frémestroff =

- Commune
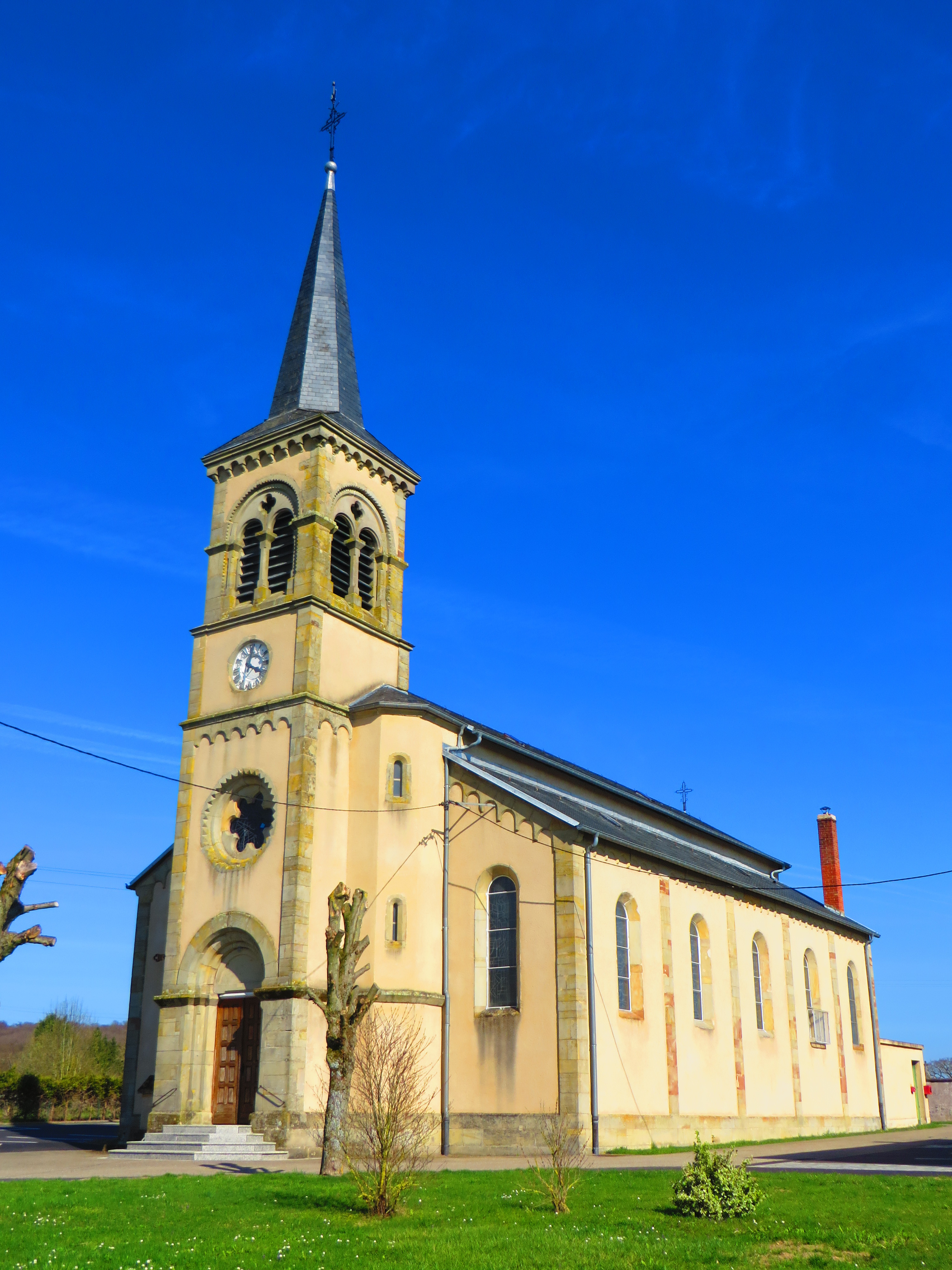
- The church in Frémestroff

- Coat of arms
- Location of Frémestroff
- Location within France Location within Grand Est
- Coordinates: 49°01′05″N 6°46′52″E
- Country: France
- Region: Grand Est
- Department: Moselle
- Arrondissement: Forbach-Boulay-Moselle
- Canton: Sarralbe
- Intercommunality: CA Saint-Avold Synergie

Government
  - Mayor (2020–2026): Laurent Filliung
- Area^{1}: 5.51 km^{2} (2.13 sq mi)
- Elevation: 263 m (863 ft)
- Highest elevation: 342 m (1,122 ft)
- Lowest elevation: 248 m (814 ft)
- Population (2023): 304
  - Density: 55.2/km^{2} (143/sq mi)
- Time zone: UTC+01:00 (CET)
  - Summer (DST): UTC+02:00 (CEST)
- INSEE/Postal code: 57237 /57660
- ^{1} French Land Register data, which excludes lakes, ponds, glaciers > 1 km^{2} (0.386 sq mi or 247 acres) and river estuaries.

Frémestroff (French pronunciation: [fʁemɛstʁɔf]; German: Fremersdorf) is a commune in the Moselle department in Grand Est in north-eastern France.

== See also ==
- Communes of the Moselle department
