= Guessling-Hémering =

- Commune
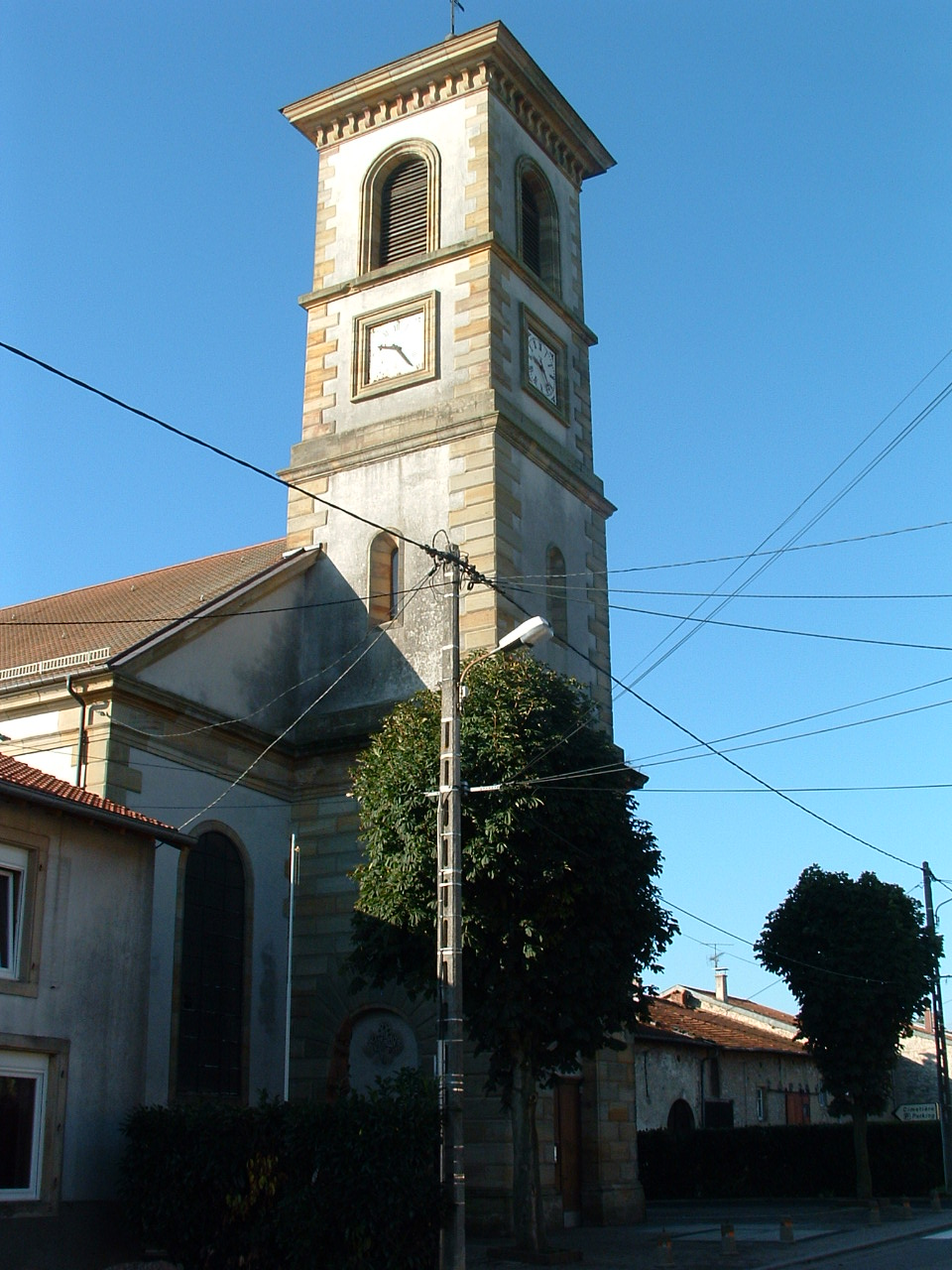
- The church in Guessling-Hémering

- Coat of arms
- Location of Guessling-Hémering
- Location within France Location within Grand Est
- Coordinates: 49°01′34″N 6°39′34″E
- Country: France
- Region: Grand Est
- Department: Moselle
- Arrondissement: Forbach-Boulay-Moselle
- Canton: Sarralbe
- Intercommunality: CA Saint-Avold Synergie

Government
  - Mayor (2020–2026): Rémy Franck
- Area^{1}: 10.06 km^{2} (3.88 sq mi)
- Elevation: 257 m (843 ft)
- Highest elevation: 319 m (1,047 ft)
- Lowest elevation: 245 m (804 ft)
- Population (2023): 925
  - Density: 91.9/km^{2} (238/sq mi)
- Time zone: UTC+01:00 (CET)
  - Summer (DST): UTC+02:00 (CEST)
- INSEE/Postal code: 57275 /57380
- ^{1} French Land Register data, which excludes lakes, ponds, glaciers > 1 km^{2} (0.386 sq mi or 247 acres) and river estuaries.

Guessling-Hémering (German: Gesslingen-Hemeringen) is a commune in the Moselle department in Grand Est in north-eastern France.

== See also ==
- Communes of the Moselle department
