= Bérig-Vintrange =

- Commune
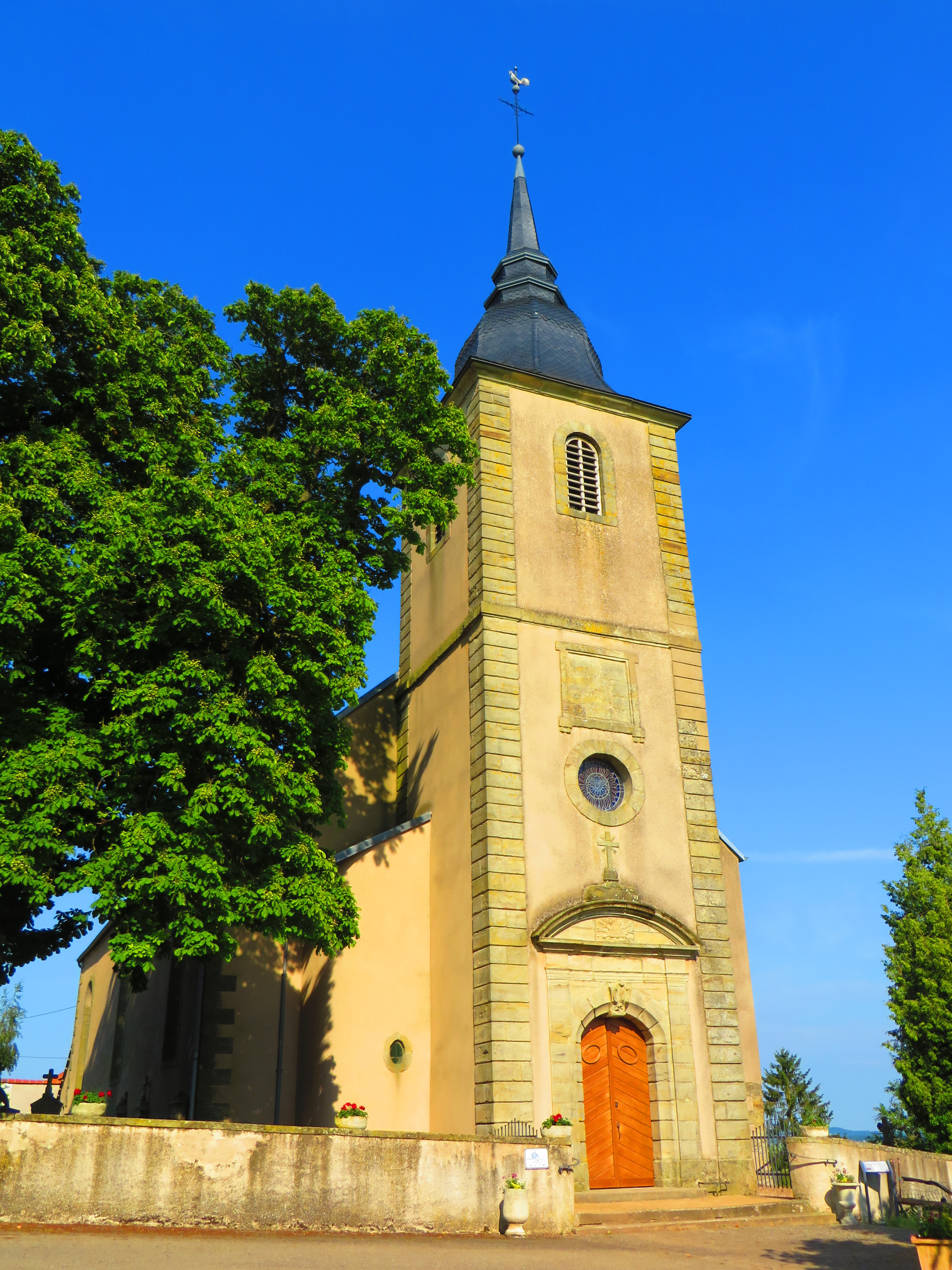
- The church in Bérig-Vintrange

- Coat of arms
- Location of Bérig-Vintrange
- Location within France Location within Grand Est
- Coordinates: 48°58′15″N 6°41′57″E
- Country: France
- Region: Grand Est
- Department: Moselle
- Arrondissement: Forbach-Boulay-Moselle
- Canton: Sarralbe
- Intercommunality: CA Saint-Avold Synergie

Government
  - Mayor (2020–2026): Guy Born
- Area^{1}: 8.52 km^{2} (3.29 sq mi)
- Elevation: 300 m (980 ft)
- Highest elevation: 295 m (968 ft)
- Lowest elevation: 233 m (764 ft)
- Population (2023): 210
  - Density: 25/km^{2} (64/sq mi)
- Time zone: UTC+01:00 (CET)
  - Summer (DST): UTC+02:00 (CEST)
- INSEE/Postal code: 57063 /57660
- ^{1} French Land Register data, which excludes lakes, ponds, glaciers > 1 km^{2} (0.386 sq mi or 247 acres) and river estuaries.

Bérig-Vintrange (French pronunciation: [beʁiɡ vɛ̃tʁɑ̃ʒ]; German: Berg-Wintringen) is a commune in the Moselle department in Grand Est in northeastern France.

== Population ==
Historical population
Year	Pop.	±% p.a.
1968	252	—
1975	245	−0.40%
1982	237	−0.47%
1990	223	−0.76%
1999	209	−0.72%
2007	232	+1.31%
2012	232	+0.00%
2017	219	−1.15%
2023	210	−0.70%
Source: INSEE

== See also ==
- Communes of the Moselle department
