= Lelling =

- Commune
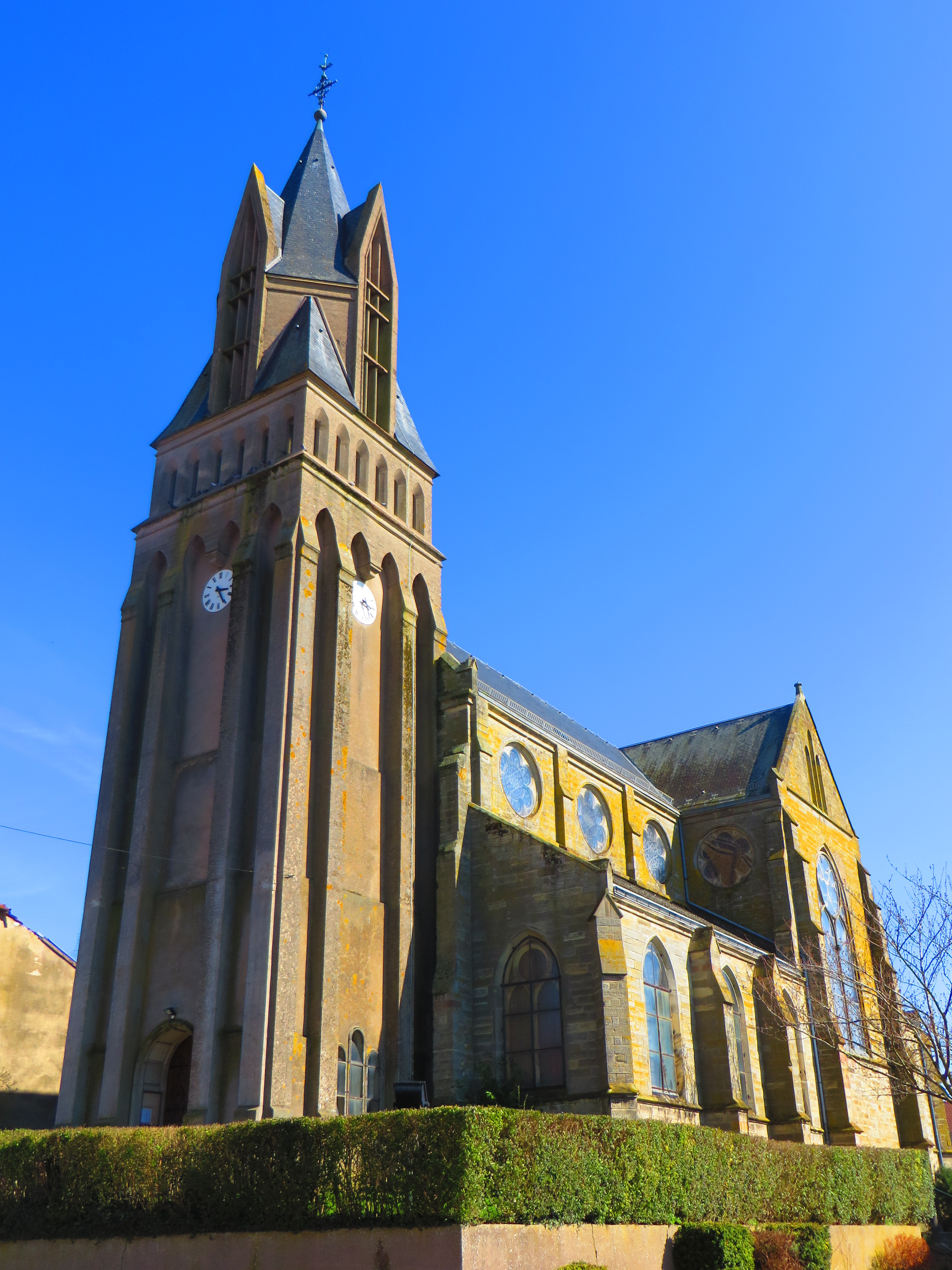
- The church in Lelling

- Coat of arms
- Location of Lelling
- Location within France Location within Grand Est
- Coordinates: 49°02′30″N 6°42′31″E
- Country: France
- Region: Grand Est
- Department: Moselle
- Arrondissement: Forbach-Boulay-Moselle
- Canton: Sarralbe
- Intercommunality: CA Saint-Avold Synergie

Government
  - Mayor (2024–2026): Gérard Simon
- Area^{1}: 4.92 km^{2} (1.90 sq mi)
- Elevation: 309 m (1,014 ft)
- Highest elevation: 320 m (1,050 ft)
- Lowest elevation: 246 m (807 ft)
- Population (2023): 458
  - Density: 93.1/km^{2} (241/sq mi)
- Time zone: UTC+01:00 (CET)
  - Summer (DST): UTC+02:00 (CEST)
- INSEE/Postal code: 57389 /57660
- ^{1} French Land Register data, which excludes lakes, ponds, glaciers > 1 km^{2} (0.386 sq mi or 247 acres) and river estuaries.

Lelling (French pronunciation: [lɛlɛ̃]; German: Lellingen) is a commune in the Moselle department in Grand Est in north-eastern France.

== See also ==
- Communes of the Moselle department
