= Baronville =

- Commune
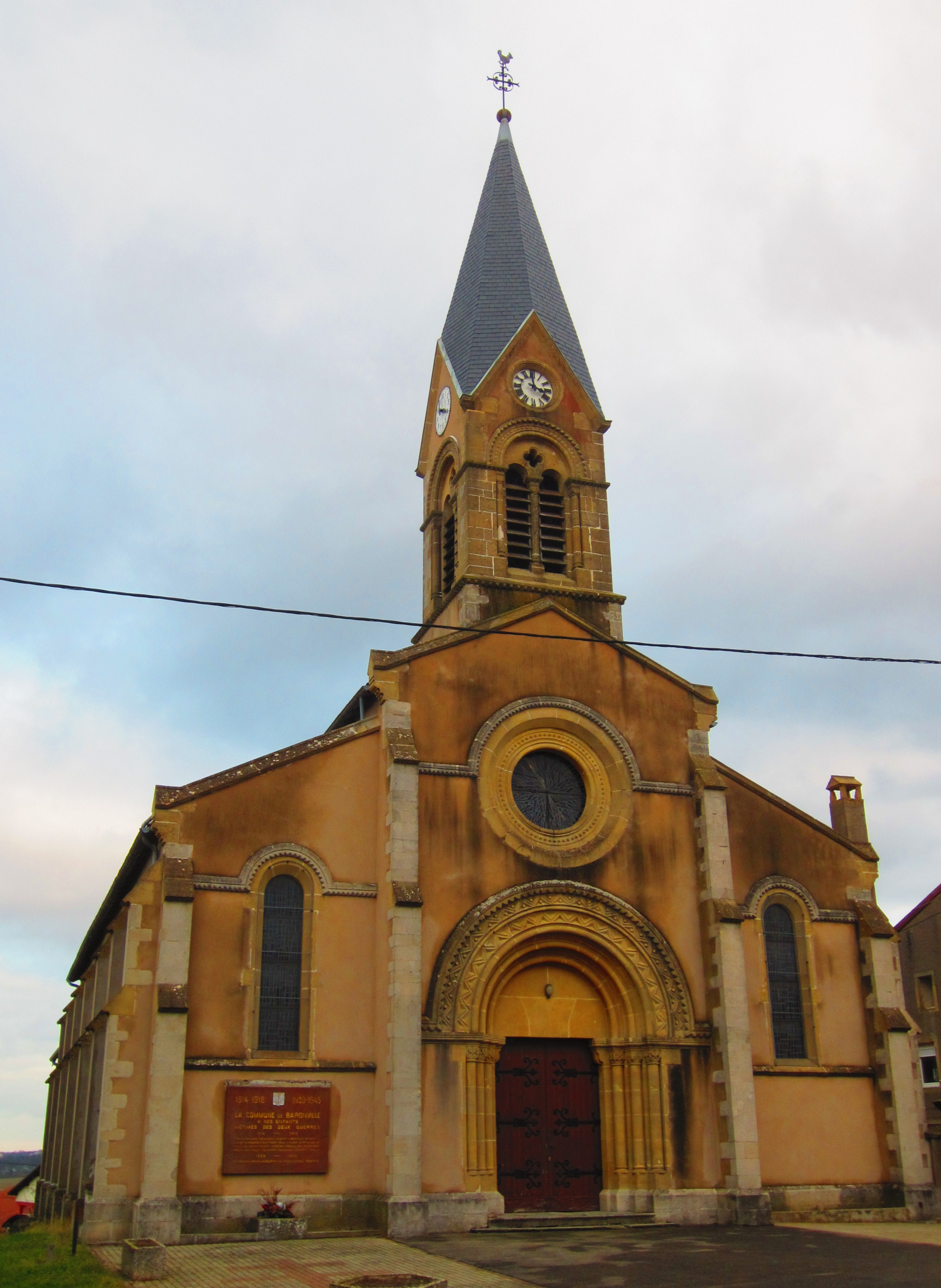
- The church in Baronville

- Coat of arms
- Location of Baronville
- Location within France Location within Grand Est
- Coordinates: 48°56′05″N 6°36′33″E
- Country: France
- Region: Grand Est
- Department: Moselle
- Arrondissement: Forbach-Boulay-Moselle
- Canton: Sarralbe
- Intercommunality: CA Saint-Avold Synergie

Government
  - Mayor (2020–2026): Bernard Jacquot
- Area^{1}: 6.18 km^{2} (2.39 sq mi)
- Elevation: 290 m (950 ft)
- Highest elevation: 322 m (1,056 ft)
- Lowest elevation: 251 m (823 ft)
- Population (2023): 369
  - Density: 59.7/km^{2} (155/sq mi)
- Time zone: UTC+01:00 (CET)
  - Summer (DST): UTC+02:00 (CEST)
- INSEE/Postal code: 57051 /57340
- ^{1} French Land Register data, which excludes lakes, ponds, glaciers > 1 km^{2} (0.386 sq mi or 247 acres) and river estuaries.

Baronville (French pronunciation: [baʁɔ̃vil]; German: Baronweiler, 1941–44 Barenweiler) is a commune in the Moselle department in Grand Est in northeastern France.

== History ==
- Previous names: Barunvilla (896), Barandorf (1361), Barendorff (1383, 1461).
- In 2007 a group of three University of York students attempted to get the fictitious town of 'BaronVille' onto the new UK version of the board game Monopoly. The news media thought that this was a French plot and reported, without sources, that the people of Baronville itself were behind it.

== Population ==
Historical population
| Year | Pop. | ±% p.a. |
|---|---|---|
| 1968 | 320 | — |
| 1975 | 352 | +1.37% |
| 1982 | 372 | +0.79% |
| 1990 | 361 | −0.37% |
| 1999 | 346 | −0.47% |
| 2007 | 387 | +1.41% |
| 2012 | 411 | +1.21% |
| 2017 | 364 | −2.40% |
| 2023 | 369 | +0.23% |
Source: INSEE

== See also ==
- Communes of the Moselle department
