= Aristocritus =

Aristocritus (Ancient Greek: Ἀριστόκριτος) is the name of several ancient people. It may refer to:

- Aristocritus, father of the Spartan general Lysander
- Aristocritus (actor), actor sent as an emissary from Pixodarus to offer his daughter's hand in marriage to a son of Philip II of Macedon
- Aristocritus, son of Charixenus of Argos, won the Dolichos and Diaulos in the Lycian games
- Aristocritus, man described in one of the speeches of Lysias as a bystander who gets hit in the head with a rock intended for the defendant in Lysias's narrative
- Aristocritus, writer of probably around the first century BCE who, according to Clement of Alexandria, wrote a book attacking the works of Heracleodorus
- Aristocritus, Greek writer who was known to have written a work about Miletus
- Aristocritus, otherwise unknown Athenian of the fifth century BCE whose well-preserved tombstone, describing him as having been slain by the god Ares, is a subject for study by scholars
- Aristocritus (writer), writer of the fifth century who wrote a work titled Theosophy
