= Theosophy (disambiguation) =

Theosophy is a religious movement established in the United States in the late 19th century.

Theosophy may also refer to:

- Theosophical Kabbalah, the stream of Kabbalah that seeks to understand and describe the divine realm
- Theosophy, a lost work by Aristocritus
- Theosophy of Tübingen, a manuscript of an epitome of the last four books of an earlier, lost Byzantine work of eleven books called Theosophy or On True Belief
- Christian theosophy, a range of positions within Christianity that focus on the attainment of direct, unmediated knowledge of the nature of divinity and the origin and purpose of the universe
- Transcendent theosophy, a doctrine and philosophy developed by Mulla Sadra
- Neo-Theosophy, a system of Theosophical ideas expounded by Annie Besant and Charles Webster Leadbeater
