= Heracleodorus =

Heracleodorus (Ancient Greek: Ἡρακλεόδωρος) could refer to one of several people of ancient Greece:

- Heracleodorus (4th century BCE), a pupil of Plato
- Heracleodorus (1st century BCE), a writer or critic of some sort whose opinions aroused the ire of several prominent critics
