= Sillegny =

- Commune
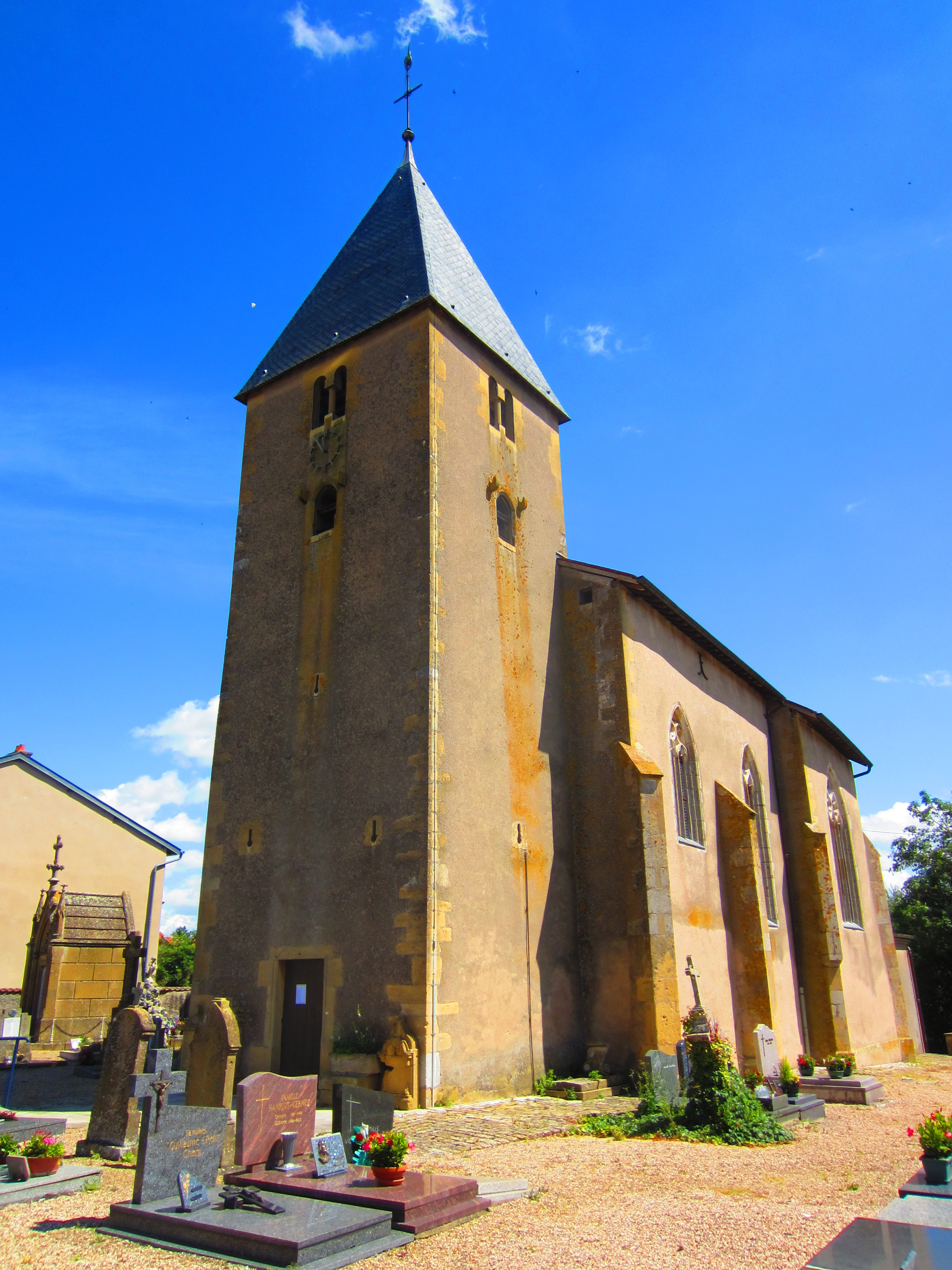
- The church in Sillegny

- Coat of arms
- Location of Sillegny
- Location within France Location within Grand Est
- Coordinates: 48°59′18″N 6°09′41″E
- Country: France
- Region: Grand Est
- Department: Moselle
- Arrondissement: Metz
- Canton: Faulquemont
- Intercommunality: Sud Messin

Government
  - Mayor (2020–2026): Jean-Marc Grunfelder
- Area^{1}: 10.46 km^{2} (4.04 sq mi)
- Elevation: 200 m (660 ft)
- Highest elevation: 237 m (778 ft)
- Lowest elevation: 172 m (564 ft)
- Population (2023): 657
  - Density: 62.8/km^{2} (163/sq mi)
- Time zone: UTC+01:00 (CET)
  - Summer (DST): UTC+02:00 (CEST)
- INSEE/Postal code: 57652 /57420
- ^{1} French Land Register data, which excludes lakes, ponds, glaciers > 1 km^{2} (0.386 sq mi or 247 acres) and river estuaries.

Sillegny (French pronunciation: [sileɲi]; also Sillégny; German: Sillningen) is a commune in the Moselle department in Grand Est in north-eastern France.

The inhabitants are referred to as the Sillegnois.

== Geography ==
Sillegny is located in the Seille Valley, a floodplain along the Seille river which flows near the village. In the west, the Côtes de Moselle massif and its outliers dominate the region.

Loiville, a hamlet belonging to the commune, is situated in the north, over the Rû des Crux in the direction of Coin-sur-Seille.

== History ==
The Roman road which connected Lyon to Trier runs west from the village along the Forêt Dominale des Six Cantons forest. Ruins of a villa were found near this road, what is a proof of the ancient occupation of Sillegny. Furthermore, the suffix "-y" comes from the Latin suffix "-iacum" (which comes himself from the Gaulish language "-ac") indicates a rural estate near a stream (the Seille river).

In the 11th century, Sillegny belonged to the abbey of Saint Pierre, and one century later to the Bishopric of Metz. In 1226 the name of the town changed and became Sulincium. In 1246 the bishop Jacques ceded the village to Sainte Marie abbey but the Diocese kept St. Martin church until the French Revolution. In 1635, at the end of the Thirty Years' War, Sillegny was nearly destroyed by the Swedish and the church became a pilgrimage place.

From 1871 to 1918 and between 1940 and 1945, when Alsace and Lorraine were annexed by Germany (see Treaty of Frankfurt (1871)), Sillegny became a German town renamed Sillningen situated in the Imperial Province of Elsass-Lothringen. The bombings of 1944 destroyed almost all the village. During the German period, casemates (fortified gun emplacements) were built in the Forêt Dominale des Six Cantons, near Les Jurieux and Marly-aux-Bois (close to the Roman road) and along the D 67 road.

== Sights ==
- Castle: demolished during World War II. The only thing remaining is the portal.
- Chapel: located in Bois de Curelle, a wild in the Forêt Dominale des Six-Cantons.
- Lorette Cross: built by Jacques Lorette in 1892.
- Saint Martin church (French: L'église Saint-Martin), nicknamed the Sistine Chapel of the Seille. Her nave was built in the 15th century. This gothic-style church had a massive fortified tower which was used for protecting the inhabitants in the troubled times. It is decorated with exceptional frescos of the second quarter of the XVIth century.
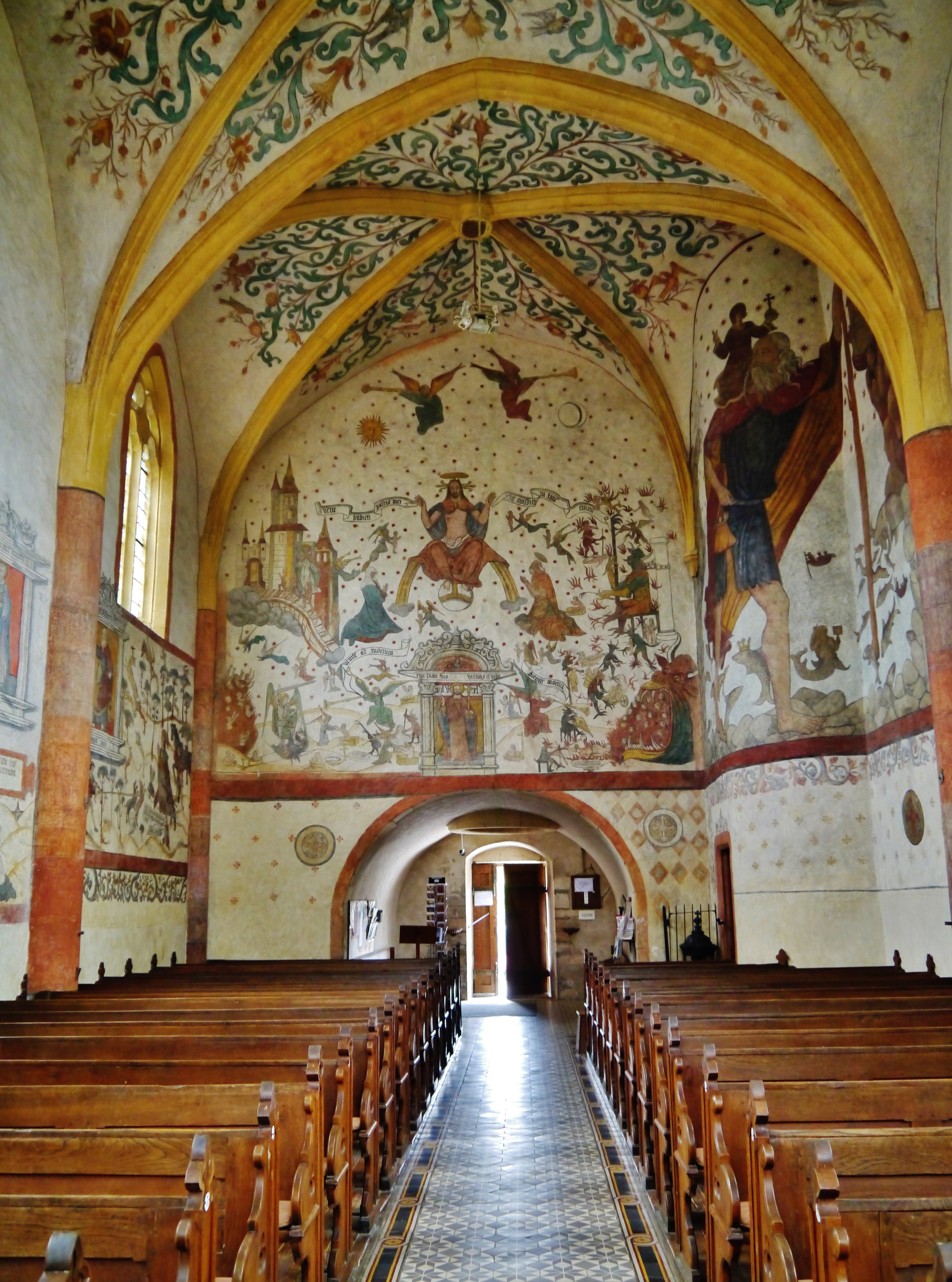
Frescos of the church of Sillegny

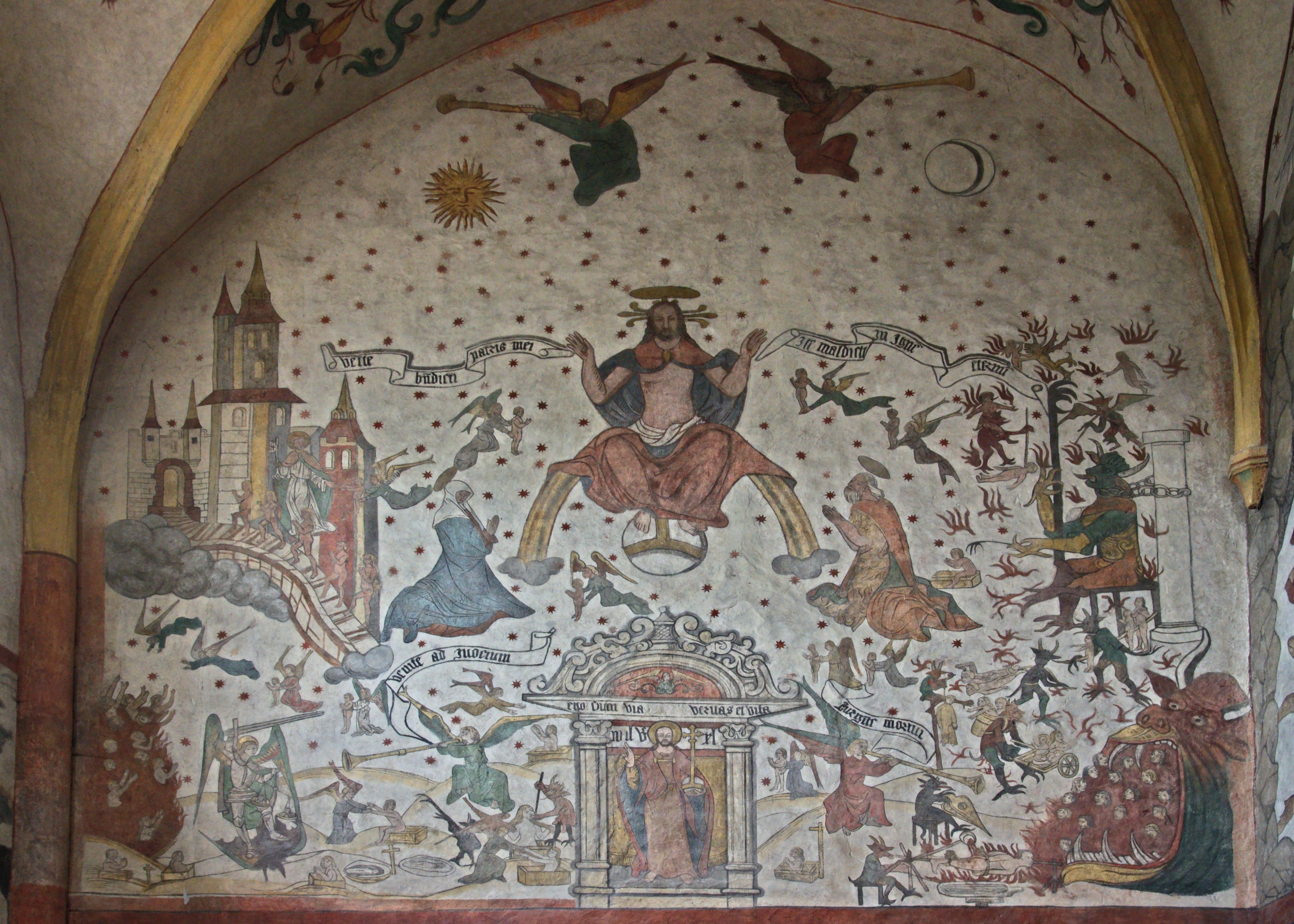
The Last Judgement fresco, Sillegny

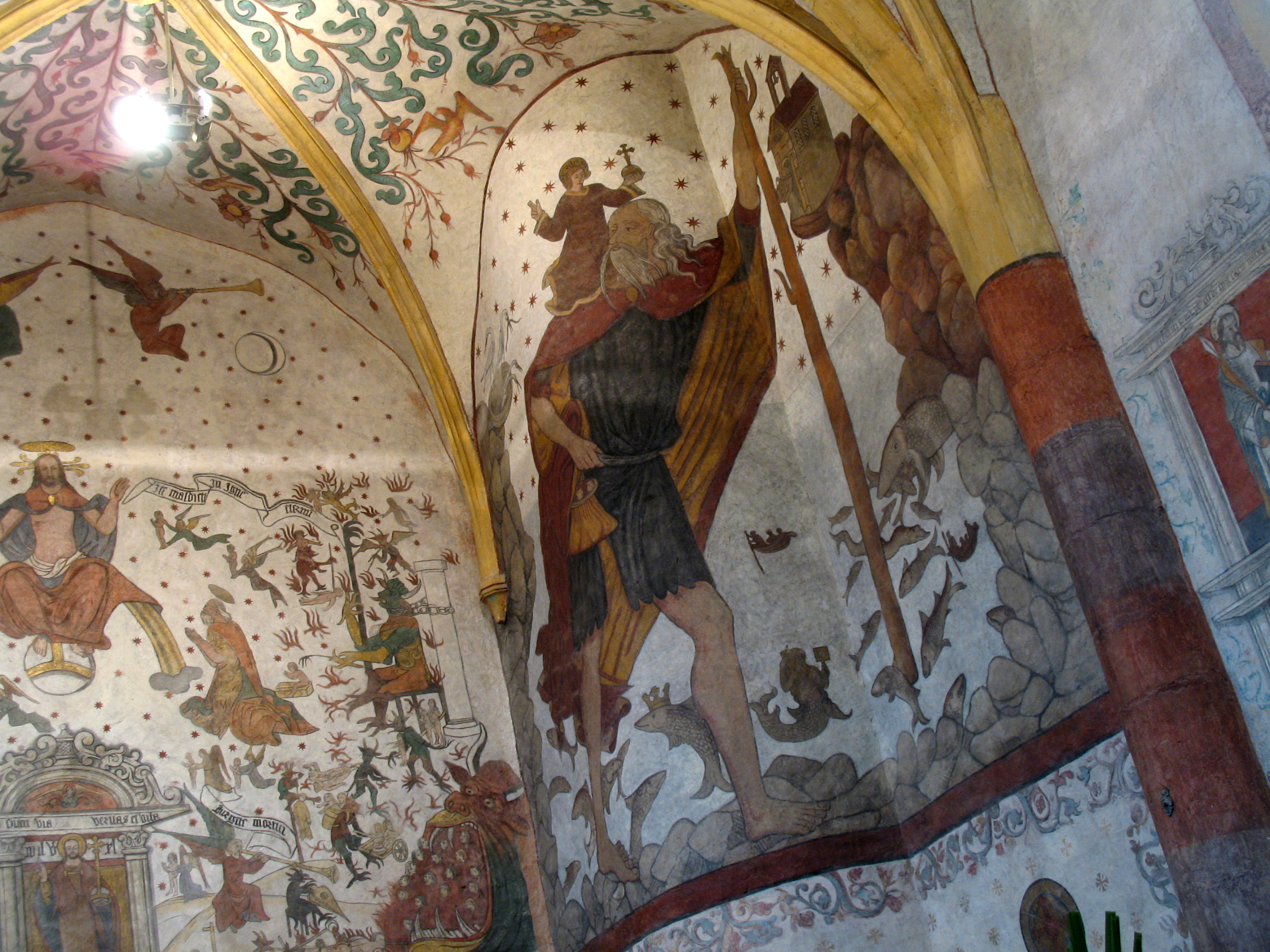
Saint Christopher fresco, Sillegny

== See also ==
- Communes of the Moselle department
