= Solgne =

- Commune
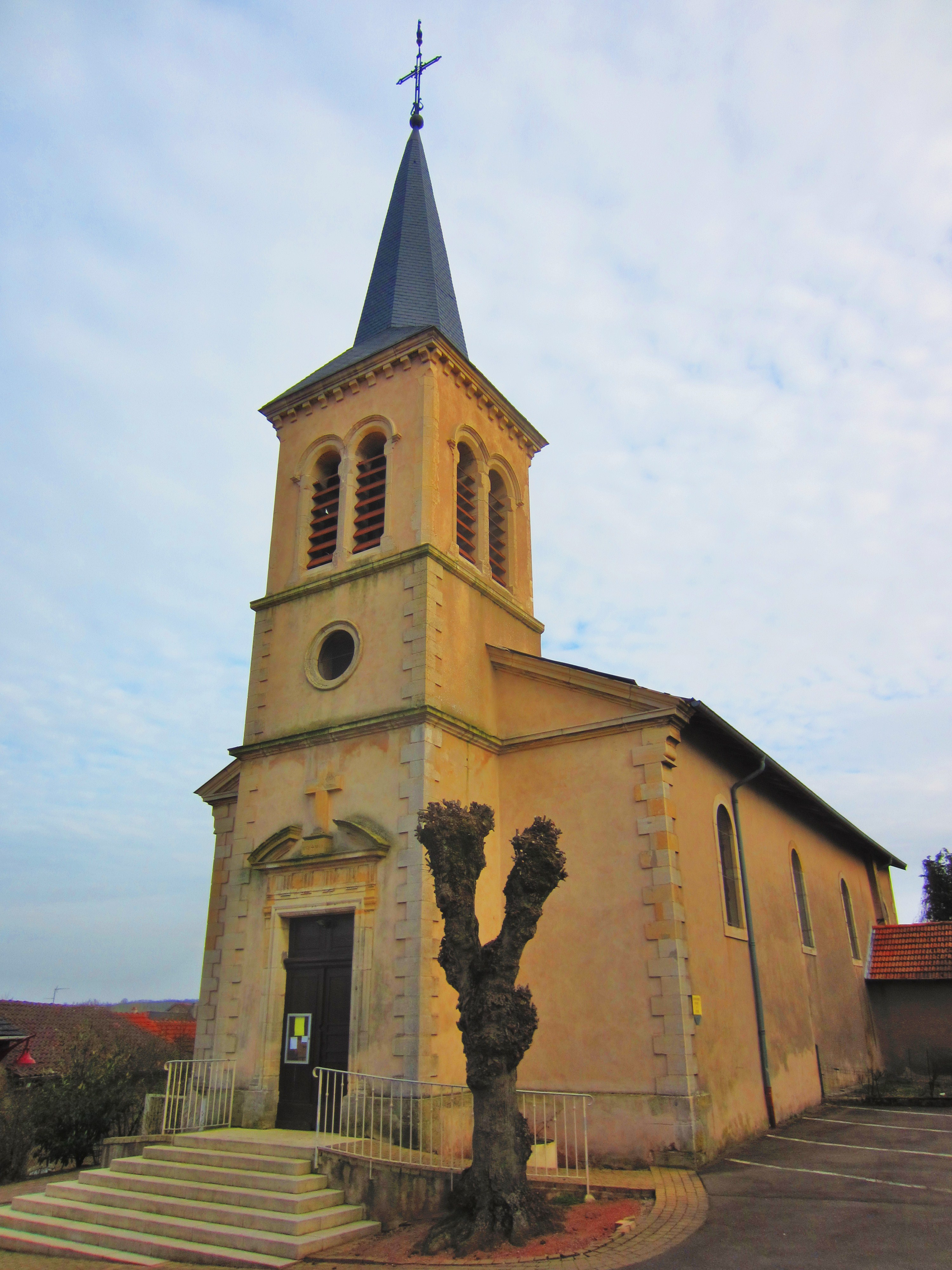
- The church in Solgne

- Coat of arms
- Location of Solgne
- Location within France Location within Grand Est
- Coordinates: 48°58′02″N 6°17′46″E
- Country: France
- Region: Grand Est
- Department: Moselle
- Arrondissement: Metz
- Canton: Faulquemont
- Intercommunality: Sud Messin

Government
  - Mayor (2021–2026): Jean Stamm
- Area^{1}: 7.29 km^{2} (2.81 sq mi)
- Elevation: 281 m (922 ft)
- Highest elevation: 299 m (981 ft)
- Lowest elevation: 240 m (790 ft)
- Population (2023): 1,133
  - Density: 155/km^{2} (403/sq mi)
- Time zone: UTC+01:00 (CET)
  - Summer (DST): UTC+02:00 (CEST)
- INSEE/Postal code: 57655 /57420
- ^{1} French Land Register data, which excludes lakes, ponds, glaciers > 1 km^{2} (0.386 sq mi or 247 acres) and river estuaries.

Solgne (French pronunciation: [sɔlɲ]; German: Solgen) is a commune in the Moselle department in Grand Est in north-eastern France. It is located 22 kilometres (14 mi) by road southeast of Metz and about the same distance northeast by road from Pont-à-Mousson. As of 2023, the population of the commune was 1,133.

== History ==
Solgne became part of France in 1661, but Alsace-Lorraine which Solgne lay in, was later under the German Empire from 1871 to 1918. Église Saint-Étienne was built in 1718 and restored in 1859. The village of Ancy-les-Solgne joined Solgne in 1810.

== Geography ==
The commune borders the communes of Buchy, Luppy, Secourt, Sailly-Achâtel and lies at an altitude of between 240 and 299 metres above sea level. It covers an area of 7.3 km^{2}. The Solgne Fault runs through the villages of Solgne and Achatel.

== Notable people ==
- Paul Bonatz (1877–1956) -German architect
- Simon Delestre (1981–) -equestrian

== See also ==
- Communes of the Moselle department
