= Metz Airport =

Metz Airport may refer to:

- Lumsden (Metz) Airport, in Saskatchewan, Canada
- Metz–Nancy–Lorraine Airport, in Lorraine, France
