= Ancerville =

Ancerville is the name of the following communes in France:

- Ancerville, Meuse, in the Meuse department
- Ancerville, Moselle, in the Moselle department
