= Pournoy =

Pournoy may refer to two communes in the Moselle department in north-eastern France:

- Pournoy-la-Chétive
- Pournoy-la-Grasse
