= Secourt =

- Commune
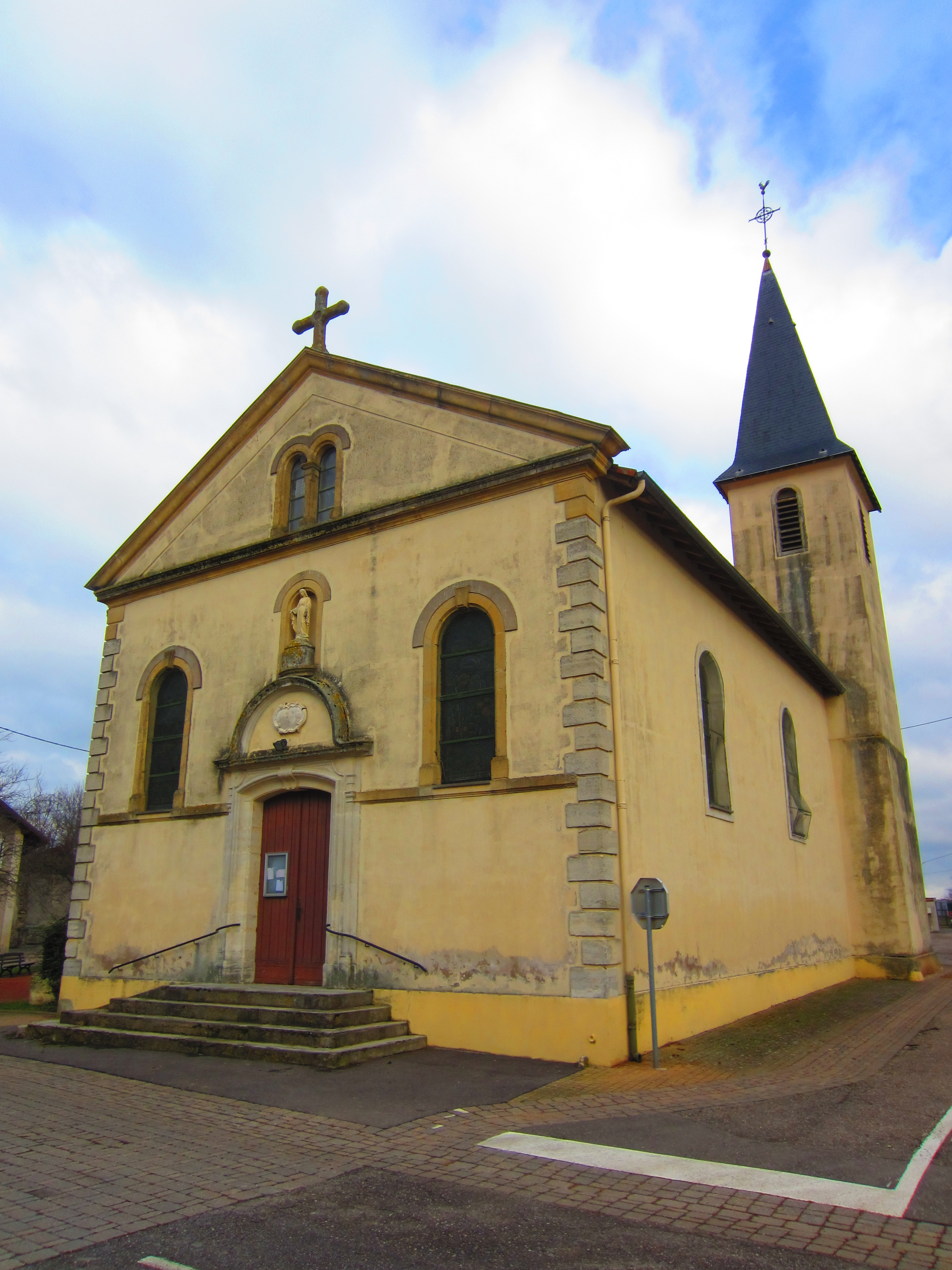
- The church in Secourt

- Coat of arms
- Location of Secourt
- Location within France Location within Grand Est
- Coordinates: 48°56′53″N 6°17′08″E
- Country: France
- Region: Grand Est
- Department: Moselle
- Arrondissement: Metz
- Canton: Le Saulnois
- Intercommunality: Sud Messin

Government
  - Mayor (2020–2026): Denis Veiss
- Area^{1}: 7.31 km^{2} (2.82 sq mi)
- Elevation: 262 m (860 ft)
- Highest elevation: 281 m (922 ft)
- Lowest elevation: 227 m (745 ft)
- Population (2023): 201
  - Density: 27.5/km^{2} (71.2/sq mi)
- Time zone: UTC+01:00 (CET)
  - Summer (DST): UTC+02:00 (CEST)
- INSEE/Postal code: 57643 /57420
- ^{1} French Land Register data, which excludes lakes, ponds, glaciers > 1 km^{2} (0.386 sq mi or 247 acres) and river estuaries.

Secourt (French pronunciation: [səkuʁ]; German: Unterhofen) is a commune in the Moselle department in Grand Est in north-eastern France.

It is located 20 km south east of Montigny-lès-Metz, 26 km south of Metz, 35 km north of Nancy. its neighbouring villages are Sailly-Achâtel, Vigny and Solgne.

== See also ==
- Communes of the Moselle department
