= University Library of Tübingen =

Academic library in Germany

- Universitätsbibliothek Tübingen
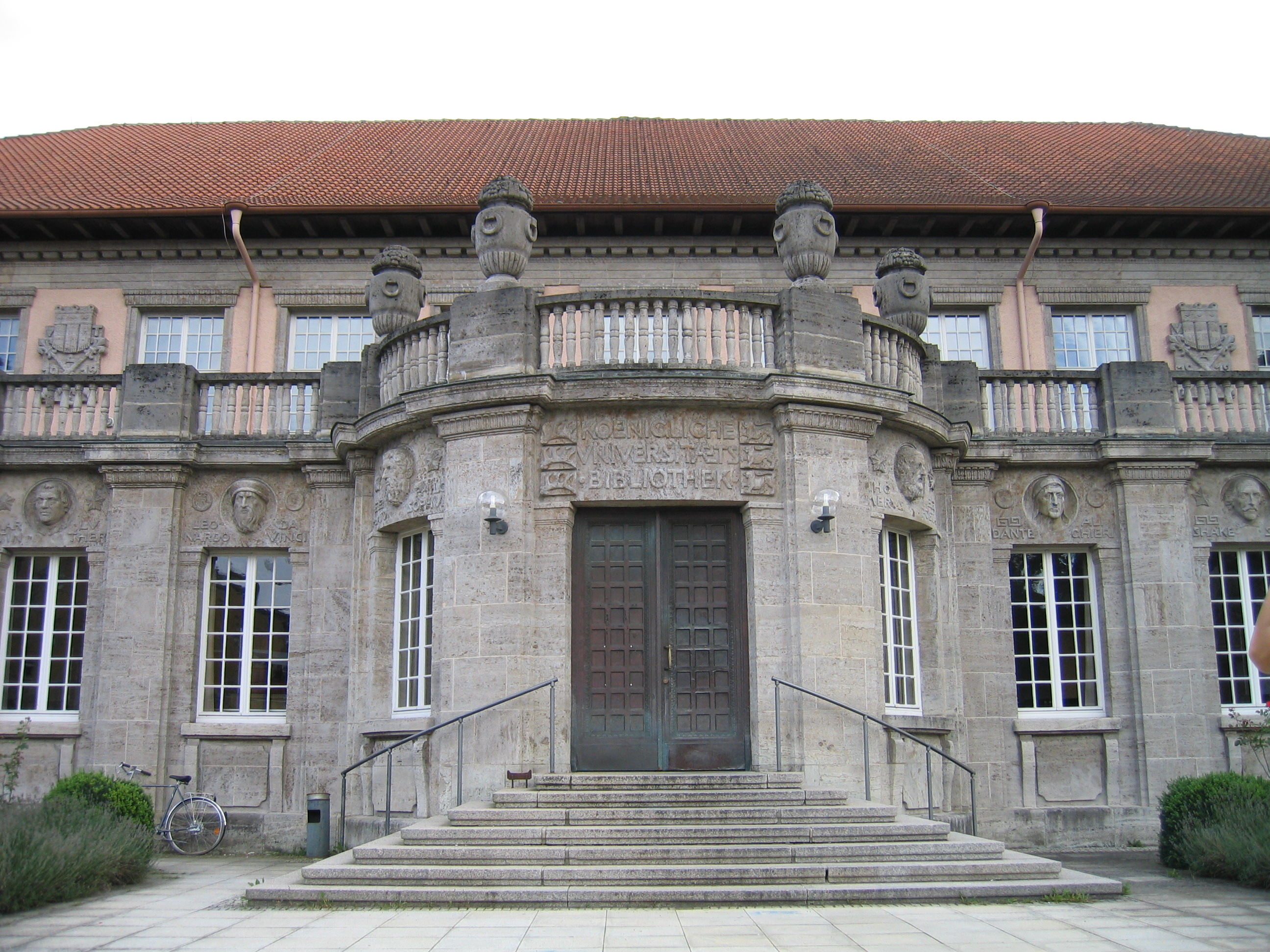
- Entrance to the main library building, 2007
- 48°31′31″N 9°03′42″E
- Location: Tübingen, Baden-Württemberg, Germany
- Type: Academic library
- Established: 1499

Collection
- Size: 3,700,000

Other information
- Director: Marianne Dörr
- Website: uni-tuebingen.de/en/facilities/university-library/home.html

The University Library of Tübingen (German: Universitätsbibliothek Tübingen; UB Tübingen) is the main library of the University of Tübingen, one of the biggest and most renowned universities in Baden-Württemberg, Germany.

The people who worked for the University Library of Tübingen include Hermann Kurz, Adelbert von Keller, Robert von Mohl and Rudolf von Roth.

After the foundation of the university in 1477, the library was located at the so-called Sapienzhaus, later it was moved to the Alte Aula, the former main building of the university, then to Hohentübingen Castle (all of those in the old town (Altstadt) of Tübingen). The oldest building of the library at its current location (officially part of the town's architectural cultural heritage) was completed in 1912; the architect was Paul Bonatz. Large buildings were adjacently added in 1963 (the current main building), 1989 (Alte Waschhalle, renovated, formerly "old laundry hall" of the university) and 2003 (Ammerbau). The main library is located centrally in the university quarter of Tübingen, east of the old town, on Wilhelmstraße, near most of the university buildings of the arts, humanities and the social sciences faculties.

A second location of the library is on the outskirts of Tübingen, at Morgenstelle, where the faculties of medicine and the natural sciences are located.

In 1776 the library housed 15,000 items; by 1822, this number had increased to 60,000, by 1912 to 514,000 and by 1963 to 1.204 million. Today, the overall inventory is approximately 3.4 million items.

In 2008, the budget was just over 9 million Euro, the number of staff was 128. Around 340,000 people, more than three times the population of the town of Tübingen, were registered as users (as usage is not only limited to enrolled students of the university (approx. 28,000), but anyone with an address in Baden-Württemberg can freely use it).

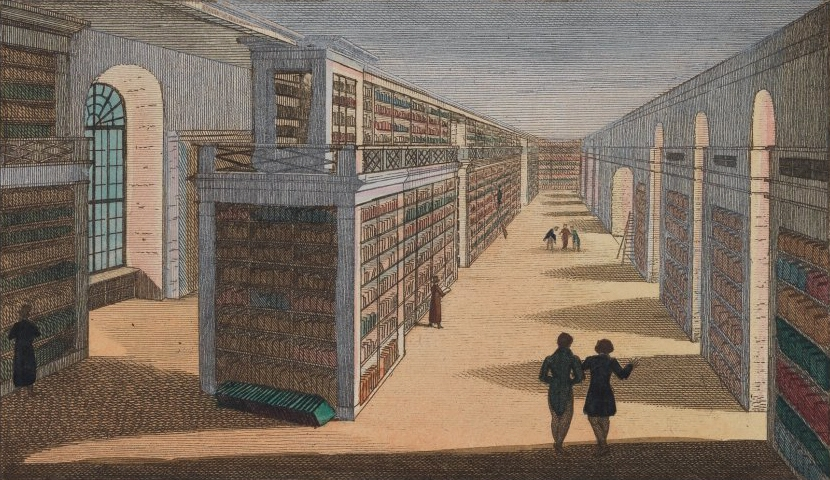
University Library of Tübingen in the Castle, c. 1822.

== Notable items in collection ==
- Theosophy of Tübingen
