= Seille (Moselle) =

River in France

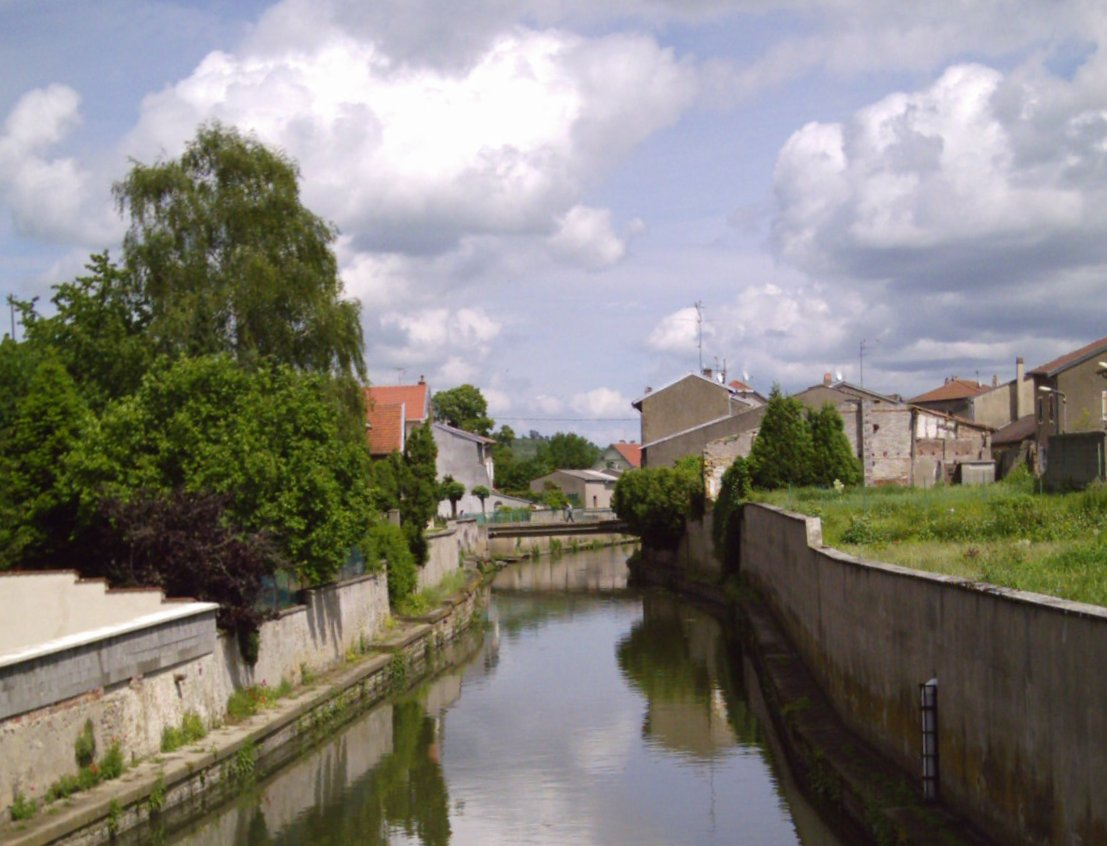
- The Seille at Vic-sur-Seille

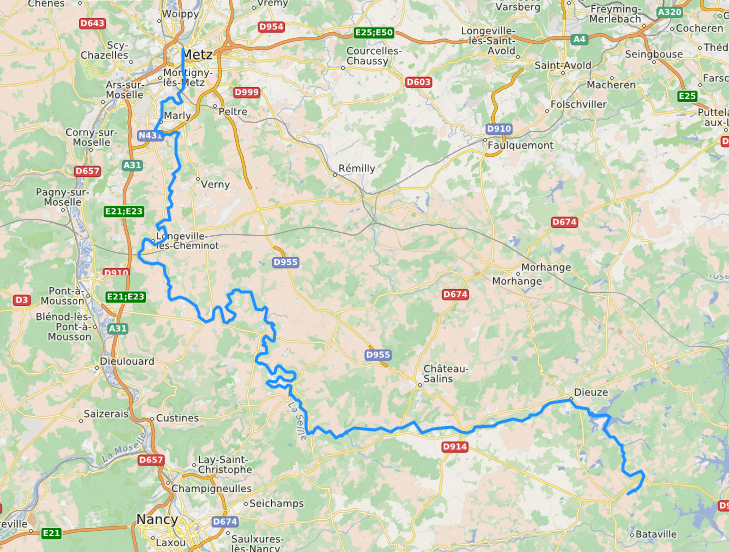

Location
- Country: France

Physical characteristics
- Source
  - location: Azoudange, Moselle
- Mouth
  - location: Moselle
  - coordinates: 49°7′32″N 6°11′8″E
- Length: 138 km (86 mi)
- Basin size: 1,348 km^{2} (520 sq mi)
- Discharge
  - average: 10.5 m^{3}/s (370 cu ft/s)

Basin features
- Progression: Moselle→ Rhine→ North Sea

The Seille (French pronunciation: [sɛj]; German: Selle) is a river in north-eastern France. It is a right tributary of the Moselle. It is also known as the Seille lorraine or the Grande Seille ("large Seille"), to distinguish it from another Seille, a small tributary of the Saône.

It originates near Azoudange, in the department of Moselle. Leaving the Lindre lake, it skirts the town of Dieuze, and traverses Vic-sur-Seille and Nomeny, before flowing into the Moselle at Metz. It is 138 km long, and has a basin area of 1348 km^{2}. Most of its length is in the department of Moselle, except for the part between Aulnois-sur-Seille and Cheminot, which is in Meurthe-et-Moselle. The Seille also forms the border between Moselle and Meurthe-et-Moselle from Chambrey to Aulnois-sur-Seille.

== Upstream ==
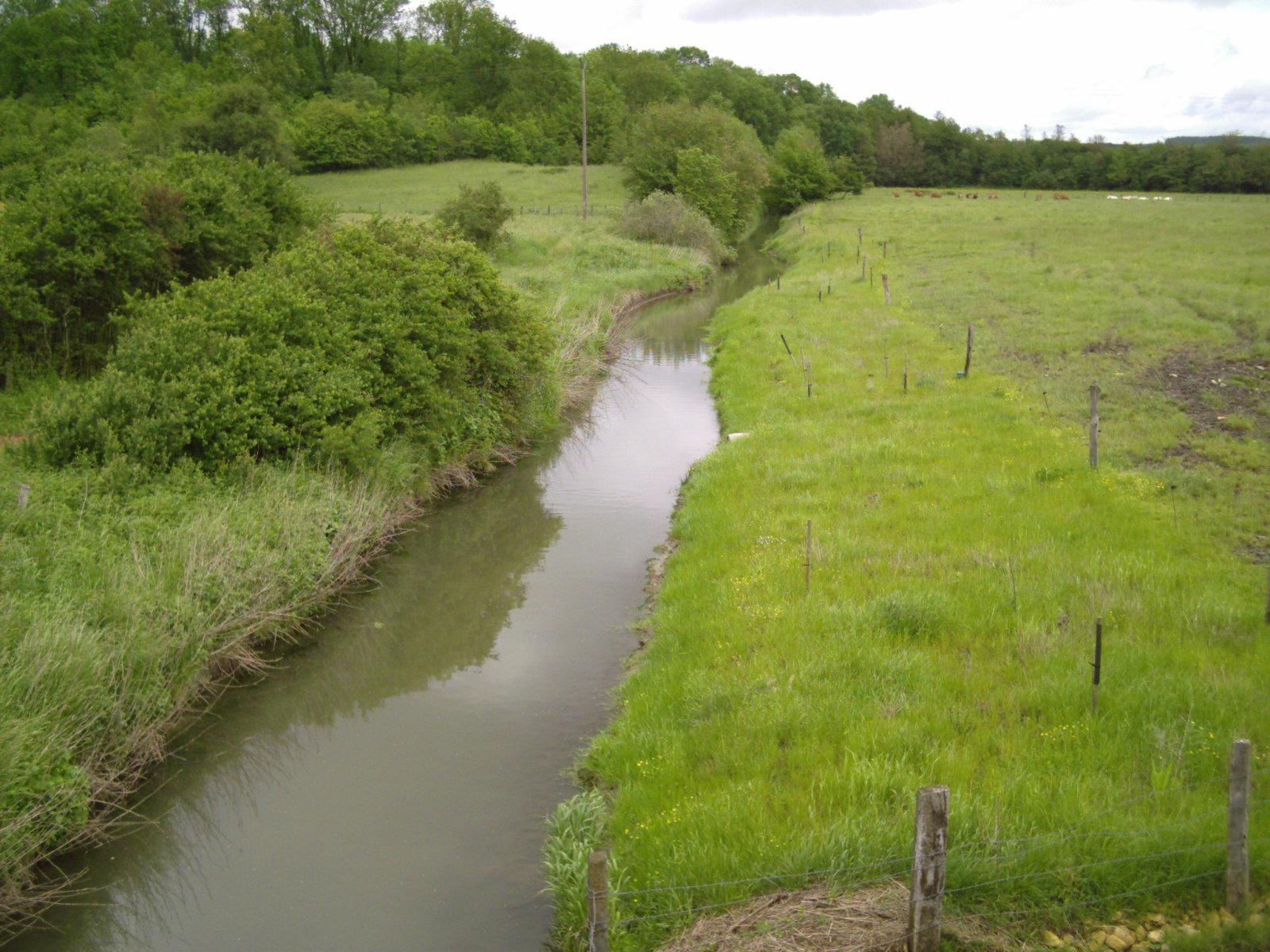
The Old Seille at Marsal. This secondary branch was the principal bed before canalization efforts in the 18th & 19th centuries.

Originating in the Pond region, the Seille then crosses the Saulnois, a region in the south of Moselle. This section of the river is part of the Parc naturel régional de Lorraine ("Regional Natural Park of Lorraine"). The river then flows into a large valley, the ground of which is composed mainly of marl and clay. Since the Middle Ages, there has been much work performed on the Seille, in part to straighten it (to render it navigable), to drain the nearby swamps, and to limit flooding of adjacent low-lying areas.

Its linear course and the treelessness of its banks makes it of little interest to the landscape, and today the erosion of its banks poses problems. Despite this, the valley is of biological interest: salt water resurgences have led to the presence of various plant species that are usually confined to coast lines, including glasswort, aster tripolium, and sea-spurreys.

As of 2004, work is being done on the river: the banks of the river are being reforested, and an oxygenation system is being installed.

The Seille has a number of tributaries, the most important of which are:

- the Spin and the Verbach, in Dieuze (right bank)
- the ruisseau de Videlange (lit. "brook of Videlange"), near Mulcey (right bank)
- the Nard, in Marsal (left bank)
- the Petite Seille (lit. "Small Seille"), in Salonnes (right bank)
- the Loutre Noire (lit. "Black Otter"), in Moncel-sur-Seille (left bank)

== Downstream ==
Downstream, the Seille is much less straight, following a contorted path along the border of the department of Moselle.

This section of the river has comparatively few tributaries:

- the Osson, at Ajoncourt
- the ruisseau Saint-Jean (lit. "St. John brook"), in Létricourt (right bank)
- the ruisseau Saint-Pierre (lit. "St. Peter brook")

Finally, in Metz, after passing the Porte des Allemands (a 13th-century castle, lit. "Gate of the Germans"), it flows into the right bank of the Moselle.

== Flora and fauna ==
The river is classified as "Category II" (categories are based on types of fish), and is the habitat for a very large variety of fish. It is also home to a variety of other animals, such as otters, herons, and caterpillars. The Seille suffers from eutrophication.

== Toponymy ==
Numerous towns and villages incorporate the name of the river. Some examples include: Aboncourt-sur-Seille, Aulnois-sur-Seille, Bey-sur-Seille, Brin-sur-Seille, Coin-sur-Seille, Haraucourt-sur-Seille, Mailly-sur-Seille, Malaucourt-sur-Seille, Moncel-sur-Seille, Morville-sur-Seille, Port-sur-Seille, and Vic-sur-Seille. The suffix "sur-Seille" means "on the Seille" in French, and the practice is analogous to the English place names that incorporate river names, such as Newcastle upon Tyne.
