= Metz–Nancy–Lorraine Airport =

Metz–Nancy–Lorraine Airport Aéroport de Metz-Nancy-Lorraine
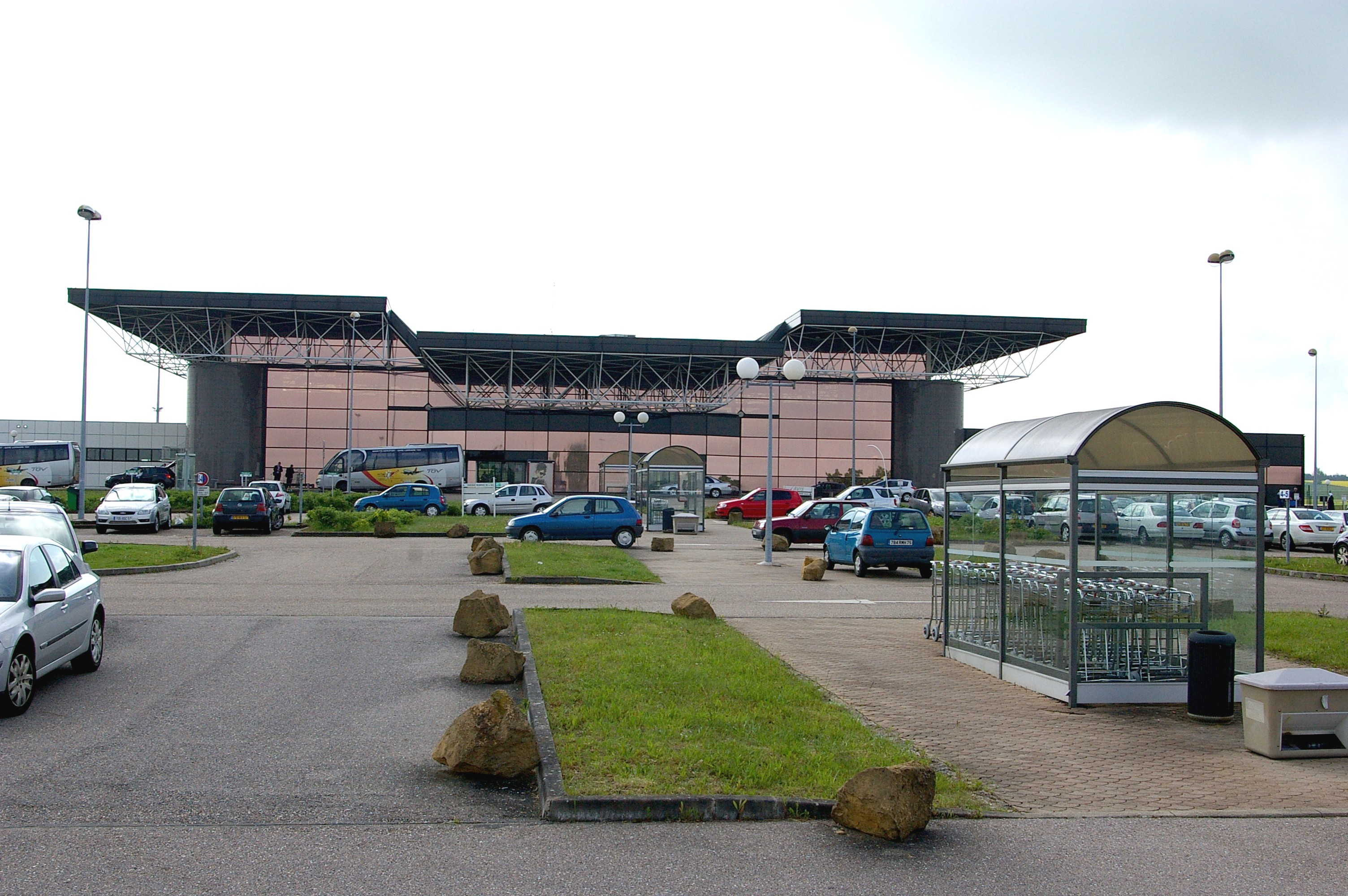
- IATA: ETZ; ICAO: LFJL

Summary
- Airport type: Public
- Operator: G.I.G.A.L. (Groupement Intercommunal de Gestion de l'Aéroport Lorrain)
- Serves: Metz and Nancy, France
- Elevation AMSL: 870 ft (270 m)
- Coordinates: 48°58′42″N 006°14′48″E
- Website: metz-nancy-lorraine.aeroport.fr

Map
- Location of the airport in Lorraine LFJL (France)

Runways
Direction	Length		Surface
Direction	m	ft	Surface
04/22	3,050	10,006	Paved

Statistics (2014)
- Passengers: 245,781
- Passenger Change 13-14: ▲1.1%
- Sources: French AIP

Metz–Nancy–Lorraine Airport or Aéroport de Metz–Nancy–Lorraine (IATA: ETZ, ICAO: LFJL) is an airport serving the Lorraine région of France. It is located in Goin, 16.5 km southeast of Metz, (both communes of the Moselle département) and north of Nancy (a commune of Meurthe-et-Moselle). It opened to the public on October 28, 1991, and replaced Nancy–Essey and Metz–Frescaty airports.

The airport used to rebrand itself as "Lorraine Airport" in English only in 2015. In 2023, however, a court ruled that the act violated the Toubon law, and the airport reverted to its French name "Lorraine Aéroport".

== Infrastructure ==
The airport is open 24/7. The runway was lengthened to 3050 m and refurbished in mid-2006 to be able to handle all types of large aircraft. The terminal building is about 7500 square metres and could accommodate up to 500,000 passengers per year with 14 check-in desks, two gates and two luggage claim belts. The cargo terminal is 3,600 square metres and could handle up to 60,000 tonnes of freight per year. The airport was a regional hub for DHL from 2000 to 2006, with flights to Toulouse, Nice, Marseilles, Cologne, Brussels, Paris, Vitoria and East-Midlands.

== Airlines and destinations ==
The following airlines operate regular scheduled and charter flights at Metz–Nancy–Lorraine Airport:

Airlines	Destinations
Aegean Airlines	Seasonal: Heraklion
Air Algérie	Algiers, Constantine, Oran
TUI fly Belgium	Casablanca

The nearest major international airports are Luxembourg Airport, located 99 km (62 mi) north and EuroAirport Basel Mulhouse Freiburg, which is located 251 km (156 mi) south east of Metz–Nancy–Lorraine Airport.

== Statistics ==
There was an error rendering the chart.

Year	Passengers	Freight
1998	288,209	3,410
1999	322,501	3,206
2000	352,626	8,521
2001	331,266	19,684
2002	302,849	18,994
2003	294,731	17,359
2004	326,324	9,030
2005	356,815	1,219
2006	340,242	633
2007	344,913	36
2008	291,006	144
2009	263,000	51
2010	254,204	69
2011	279,030	44
2012	280,743	
2013	242,995	
2014	245,781	

== Ground transportation ==
A shuttle bus to Nancy and Metz meets every departing and arriving flight. The journey takes about 30 minutes and costs 8 euros.
