= Paul Bonatz =

German architect (1877–1956)

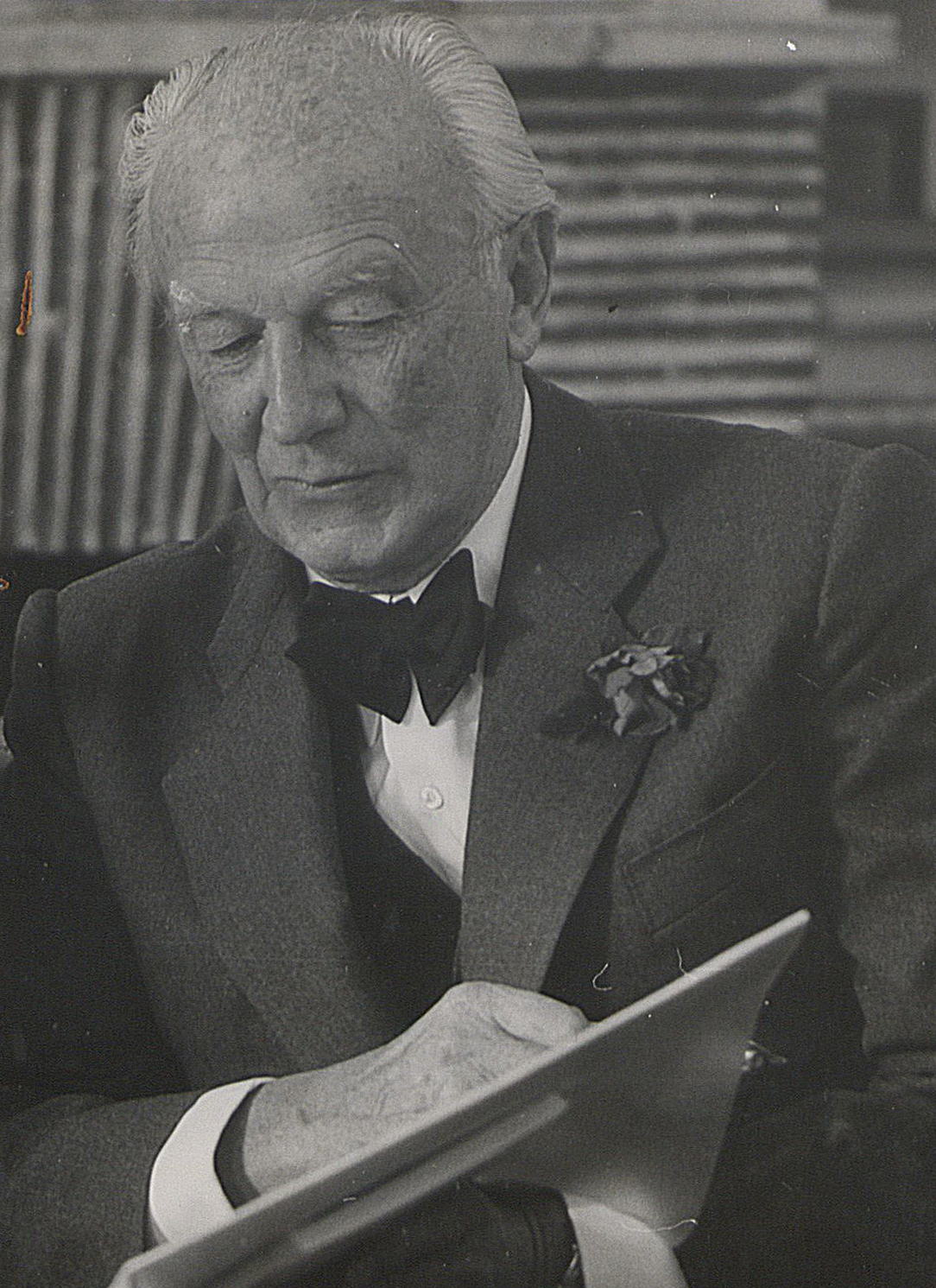
- Born: 6 December 1877; Solgne, Alsace-Lorraine, German Empire
- Died: 20 December 1956 (aged 79); Stuttgart, West Germany
- Education: Technical University of Munich, University of Stuttgart, Istanbul Technical University
- Occupation: Architect
- Practice: Bonatz und Scholer
- Buildings: Stuttgart Hauptbahnhof

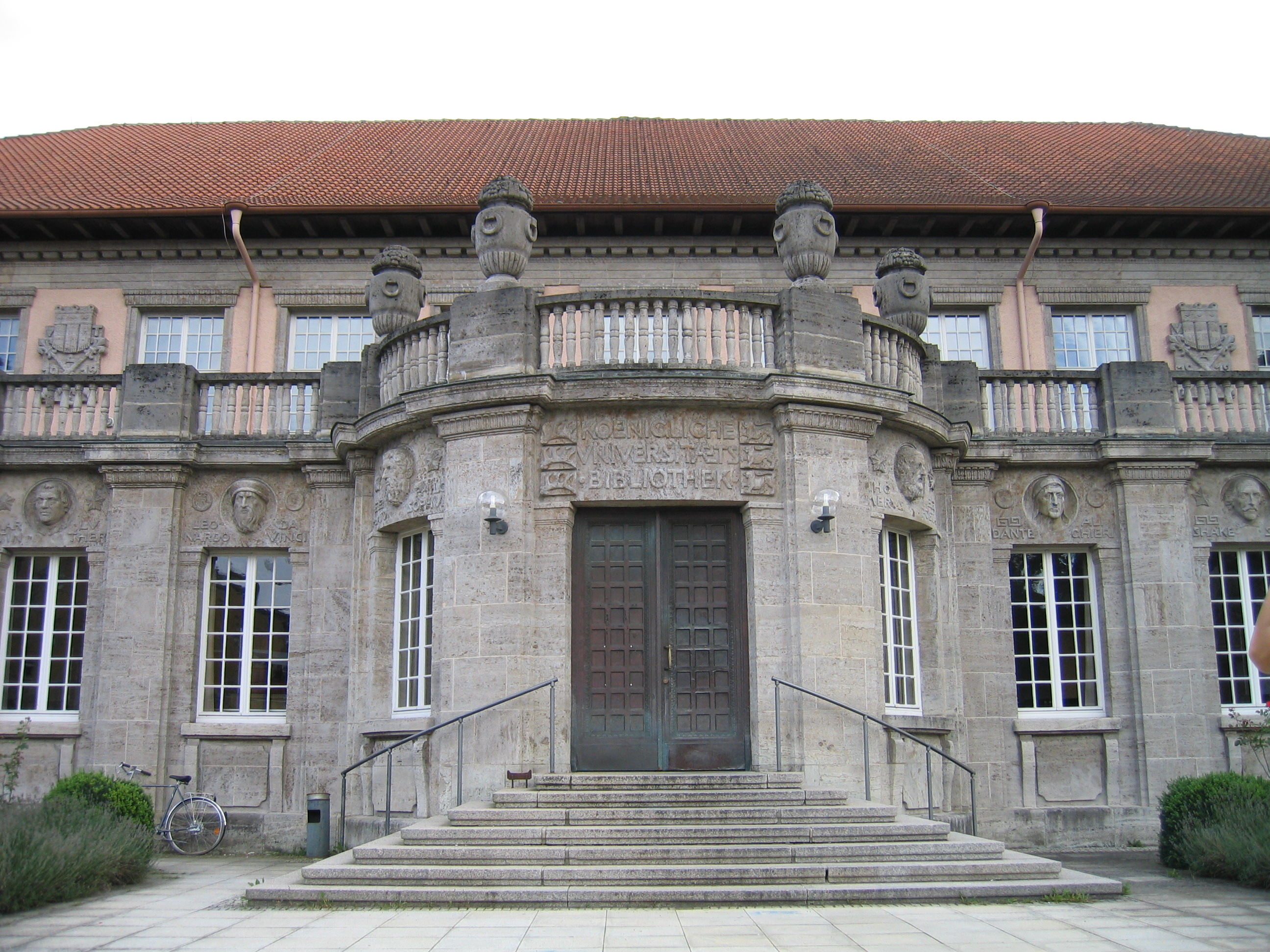
University Library of Tübingen (1910–1912)

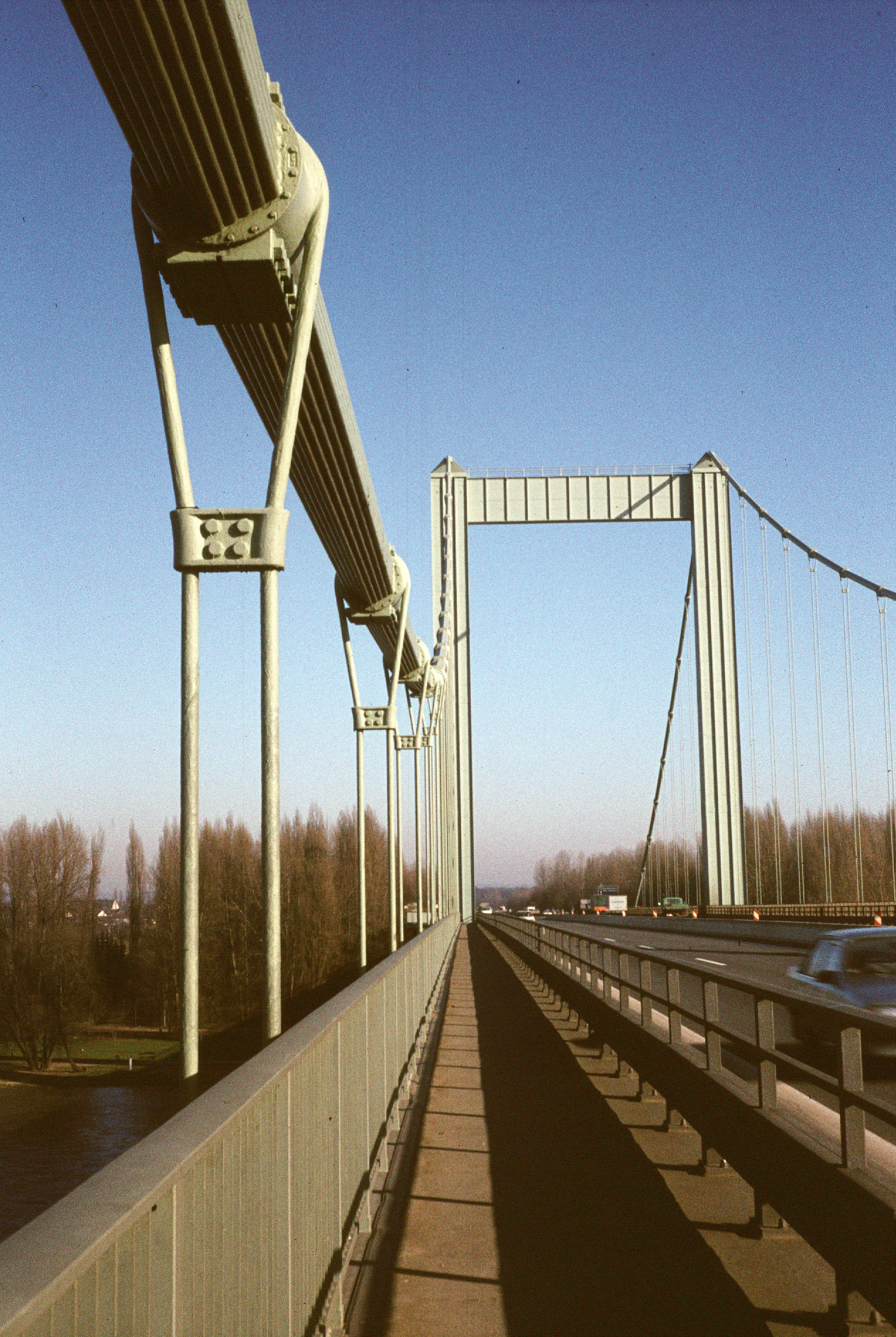
Pillar of Cologne Rodenkirchen Bridge (1939–1941; rebuilt after destruction in 1945 and since widened)

Paul Bonatz (6 December 1877 – 20 December 1956) was a German architect. He was member of the Stuttgart School and professor at the University of Stuttgart during part of World War II, and from 1954 until his death. He worked in many styles, but most often in a simplified neo-Romanesque, and designed important public buildings both in the Weimar Republic and under the Third Reich, including major bridges for the new autobahns. In 1943 he designed several buildings in Turkey, returning to Stuttgart in 1954.

== Life and career ==
Bonatz was born on 6 December 1877, in Solgne, Alsace-Lorraine, then German Empire. In 1900, he finished his studies of architecture at the Technical University of Munich. He trained under Theodor Fischer. Like Fischer, he did not join the Nazi party, and had actually briefly belonged to the SPD. After building several major buildings during the Weimar Republic, notably the Stuttgart Hauptbahnhof (main station, 1913–1927), after the Nazis came to power he became architectural expert and advisor to Fritz Todt, the general inspector for German road building, and in this position built major bridges for the new Reichsautobahn system and with Hermann Giesler worked on the design for a planned new main station for Munich.

The government tried to make good use of Bonatz's talents and name, but found him politically unreliable. He disliked Paul Troost's renovation of the Königsplatz in Munich and said so, a political mistake. In February 1935, he gave a speech inveighing against architecture which made "the act of representing an end in itself" rather than form coinciding with function in which he called Albert Speer's New Reich Chancellery "patently inadequate".

Although Bonatz won the competition to execute the gigantic glass dome for the new main station in Munich, he soon became disenchanted with Hitler's requiring the dome and critical of the entire design. This led him to leave Germany for Turkey in 1943. He was a faculty member at the Istanbul Technical University from 1946 to 1954 and oversaw renovation of the university's Taşkışla campus. While in Turkey he built many projects in Ankara, including a residential area with over 400 units and the reconfiguration of the Ankara Exhibition Hall into the Ankara Opera House, before returning to Germany in 1954 to participate in the reconstruction of Stuttgart and Düsseldorf. He was a professor at the University of Stuttgart from 1954 until his death on 20 December 1956, aged 79.

== Personal life ==
In 1902, Bonatz married Helene Fröhlich (1879–1965); their daughter Susanne, born in 1906, married the architect Kurt Dübbers. His younger brother, Karl Bonatz, was also an architect and was chief planner of (West) Berlin succeeding Hans Scharoun.

== Works ==
Bonatz believed passionately in form expressing function, but opposed the modernist tradition exemplified by Neues Bauen and the Bauhaus, which he considered shallow, fashionable, and neglectful of local traditions. He was a founder and an important exponent of the Stuttgart School, which sought modern architectural solutions based on tradition. He thus worked in a number of styles depending on purpose, although he was influenced by Fischer's movement toward a simplified masonry-based style based on German heritage and often used a simplified neo-Romanesque vocabulary, as in his 1927 Stuttgart Hauptbahnhof, his 1936 Kunstmuseum Basel (art museum), and the viaducts at the Drackensteiner Hang. The Stuttgart station, which was influential, has been seen as a transformation of historicism: the building itself was modern, the historical decor purely stylistic accents. Like Fischer, Heinrich Tessenow and German Bestelmeyer, he appealed to the Nazis because many of his works bore a clear relationship to traditional styles; Paul Schultze-Naumburg expressed the völkisch school's approval of the Stuttgart station as "a modern technical building in the best sense of the word." However, his autobahn bridge across the Rhine at Rodenkirchen (1939–1941) was an ultra-modern suspension bridge, he designed a number of dams and factories in addition to bridges, and at Kornwestheim he coupled a reinforced concrete water tower with offices on the lower floor with a hipped-roof town hall.

Bonatz's most famous building in Stuttgart is the Stuttgart Hauptbahnhof (main station), built 1913–1927. On 25 November 2009 the station complex was nominated by UNESCO for possible inclusion in their World Cultural Heritage list.

Bonatz also designed the library building of the University of Tübingen (built 1910–1912) and was involved in the final stages of the architectural design of the Sofia University Faculty of Biology building in Sofia, Bulgaria. The brick edifice was constructed in 1924–30 and was mostly designed by the Bulgarian architect Georgi Ovcharov, who worked the project out at Bonatz's office in Stuttgart.

Among his technical buildings, Bonatz built bridges from the start of his career, beginning at Ulm in 1907 and including a slender bridge over the Neckar at Heidelberg in 1927. For the autobahns, he oversaw all bridge design and himself designed many of the innumerable small bridges required. In the 1920s he was responsible for ten dams on the Neckar; he used different construction materials to reflect the local geology.

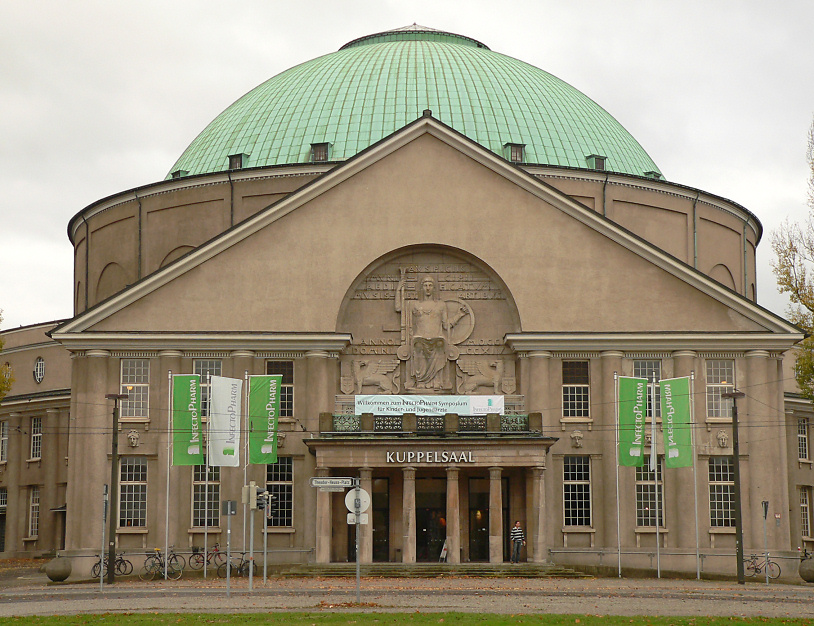
Townhall Hanover (1911–1914)

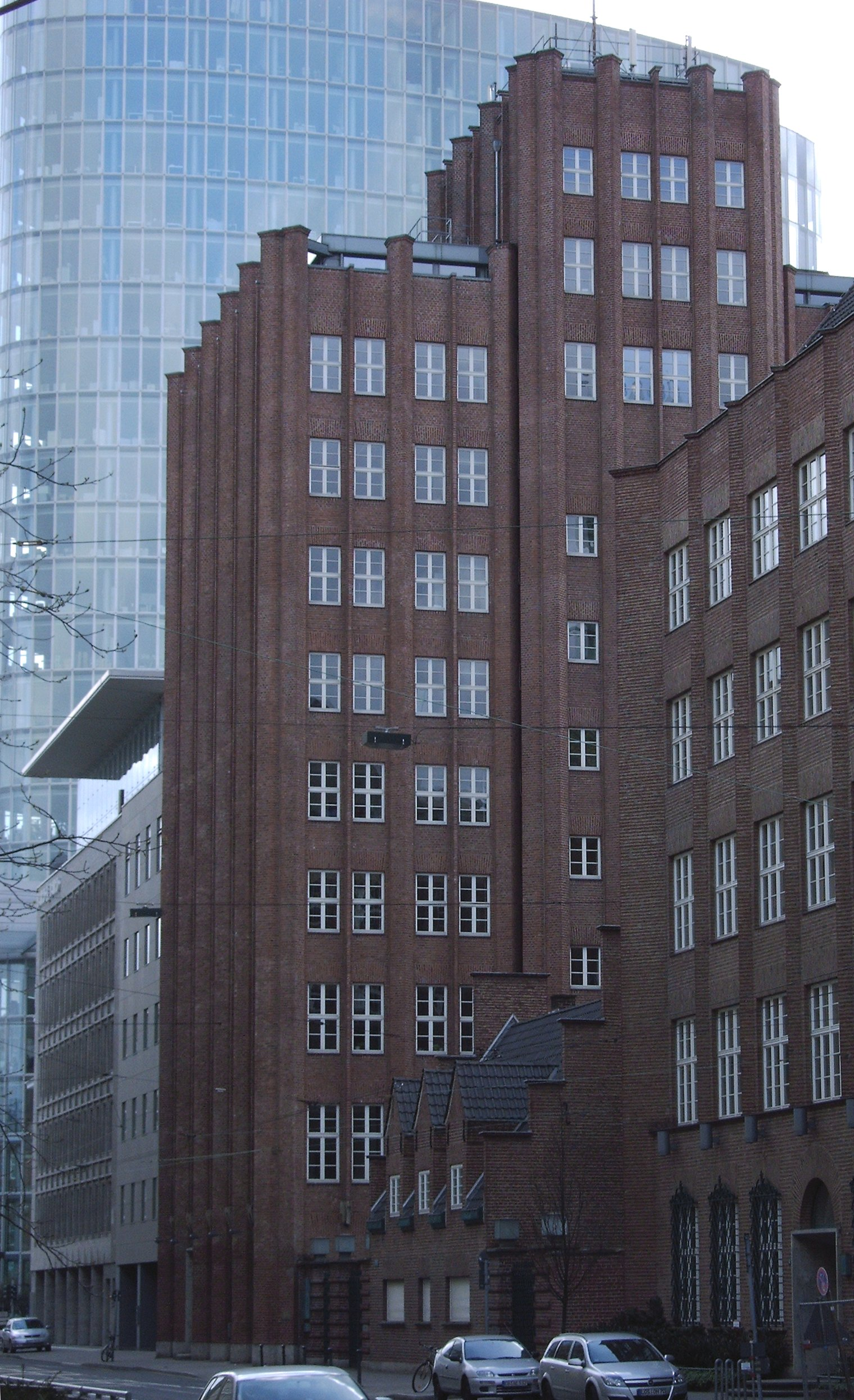
Stummhaus office building in Düsseldorf (1922–1925)

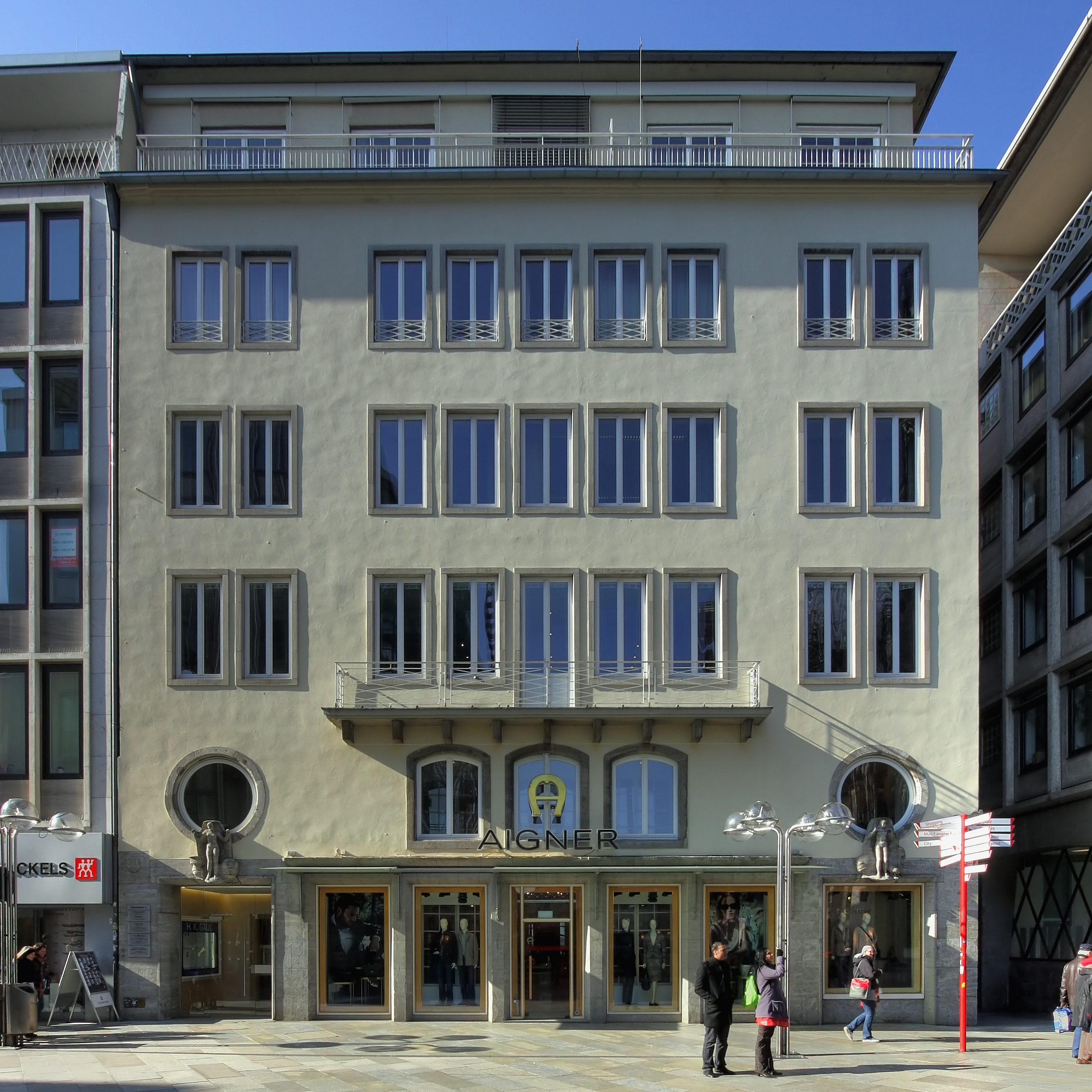
Haus Goldschmidt commercial and residential building in Cologne, 1927/28

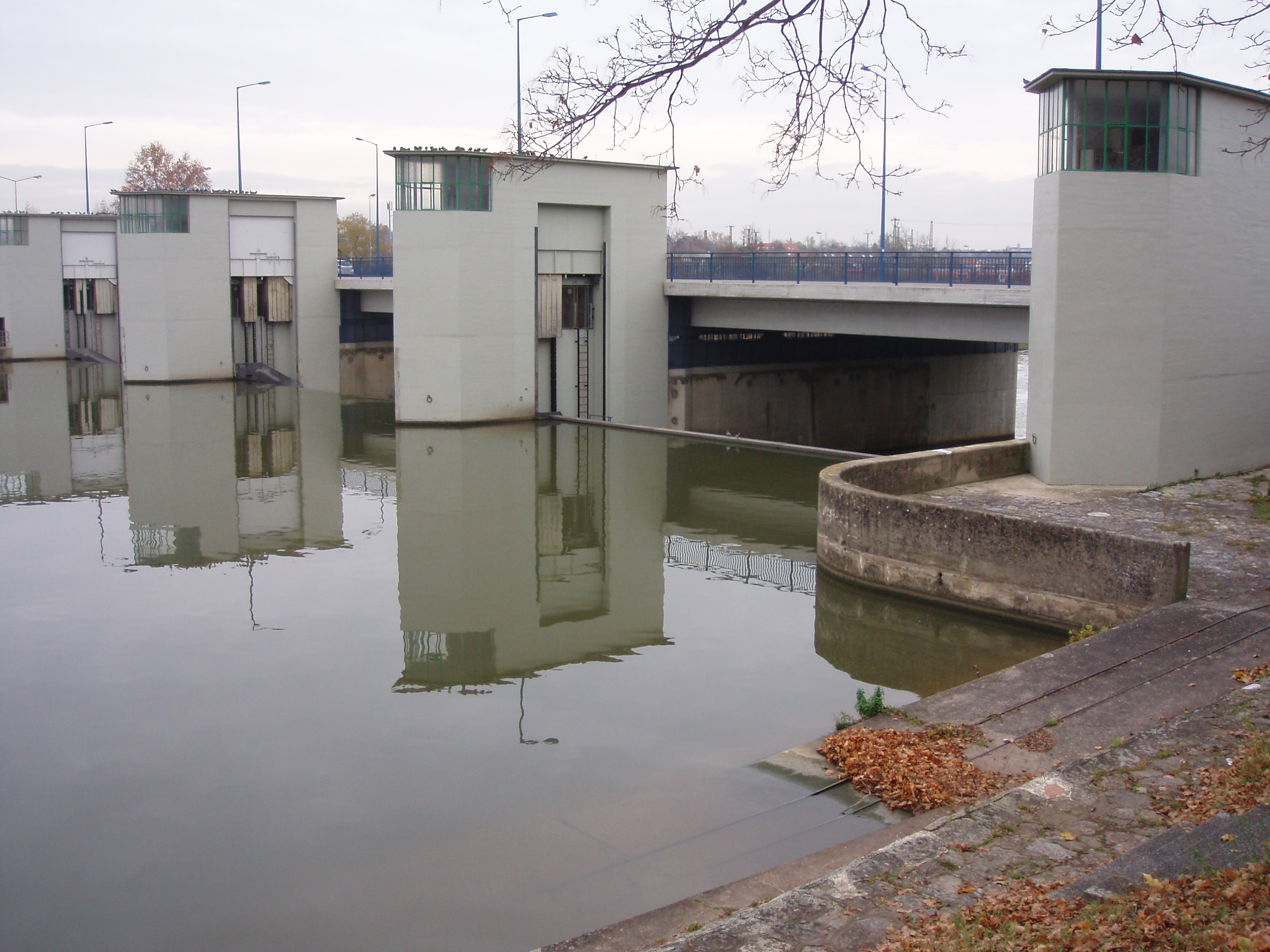
Barrage on the Neckar at Heilbronn, 1929

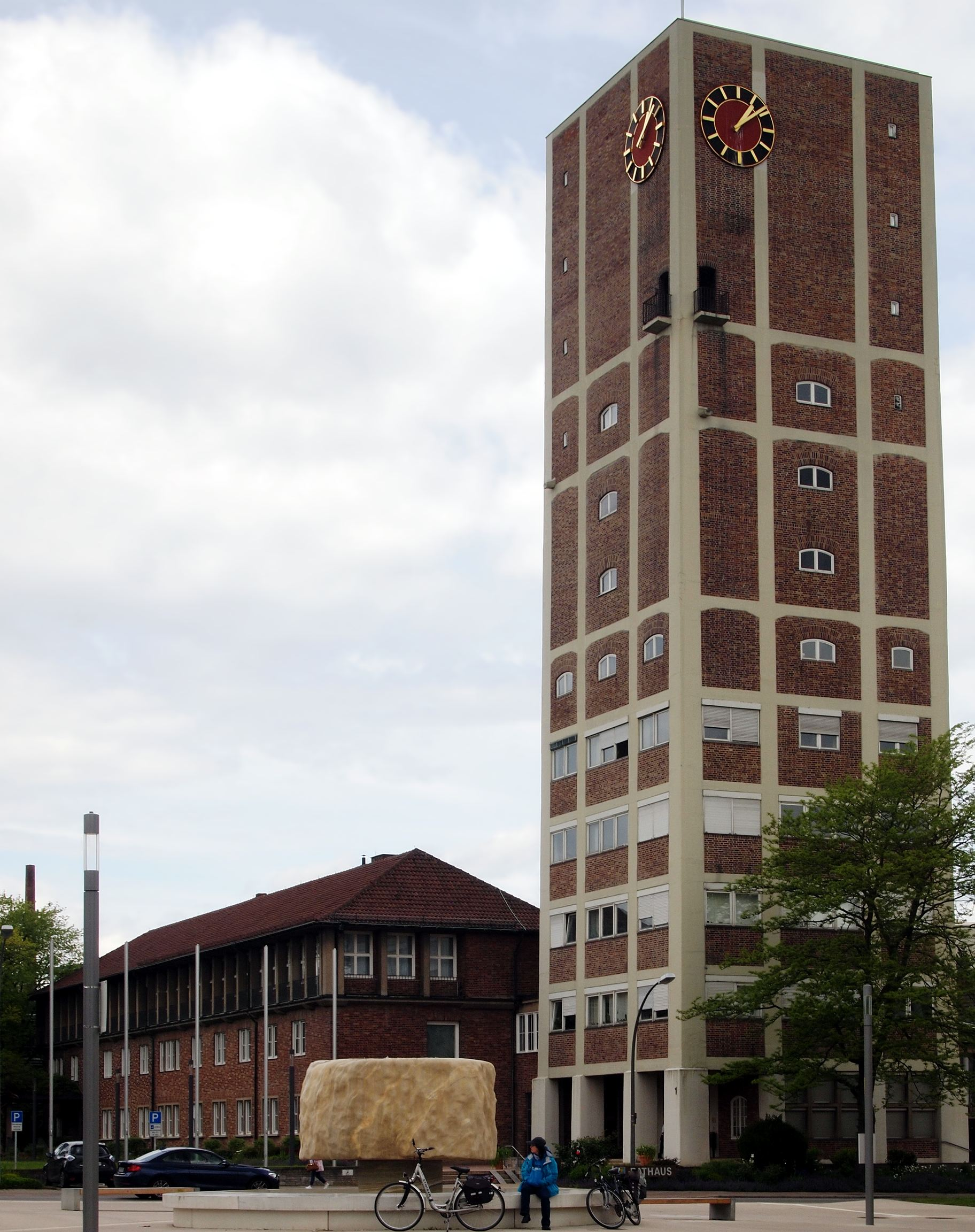
Joint townhall and watertower, Kornwestheim 1935

== Honours ==
- 1942 Goethe-Medaille für Kunst und Wissenschaft, 'Goethe Medal for Art and Science'.
- In 1952, he was awarded the Pour le Mérite for Arts and Sciences.
- In 1958/59, the city of Stuttgart instituted the Paul Bonatz Prize for architectural services in his memory.

== See also ==
- Nazi architecture
- Organisation Todt
