= Heracleodorus (4th century BCE) =

Student of the ancient Greek philosopher Plato

Heracleodorus (Ancient Greek: Ἡρακλεόδωρος) was a student of the ancient Greek philosopher Plato, who, after being for some time under the instruction of that philosopher, became negligent, and gave himself up to idleness; a charge which drew a letter of criticism from Demosthenes, who is said to have been a fellow student of Plato at the time.

This letter is mentioned in a fragment of the commentary on Plato's Gorgias written by Olympiodorus the Younger, preserved in the manuscript collection of Praeannotamenta Miscellanea in Platonem, in what was the imperial library at Vienna and is now the Austrian National Library.
