= Goin, Moselle =

Goin
- Commune
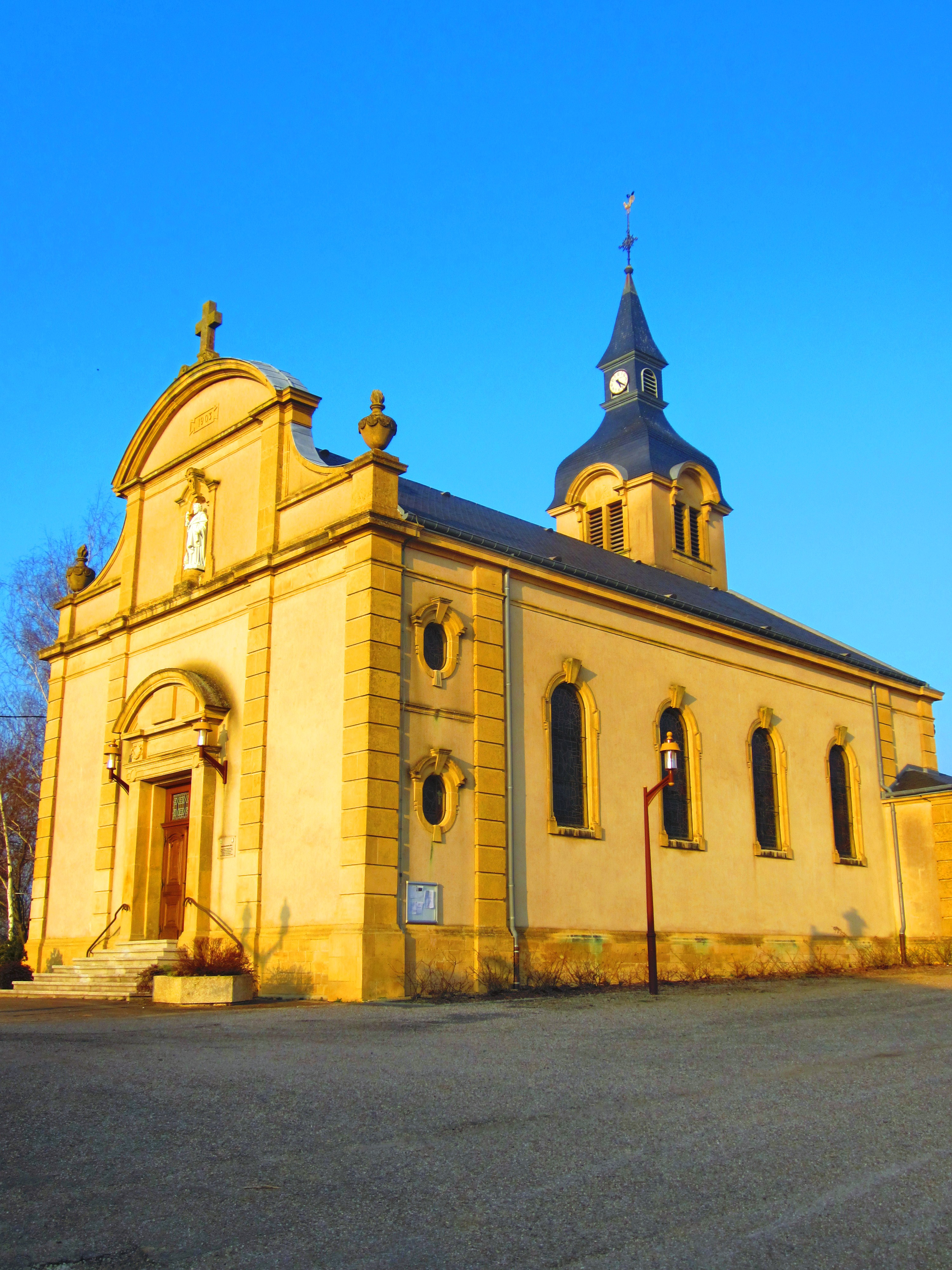
- The church in Goin

- Coat of arms
- Location of Goin
- Location within France Location within Grand Est
- Coordinates: 48°59′14″N 6°13′07″E
- Country: France
- Region: Grand Est
- Department: Moselle
- Arrondissement: Metz
- Canton: Faulquemont
- Intercommunality: Sud Messin

Government
  - Mayor (2020–2026): Jean-Marc Remy
- Area^{1}: 9.07 km^{2} (3.50 sq mi)
- Elevation: 220 m (720 ft)
- Highest elevation: 270 m (890 ft)
- Lowest elevation: 184 m (604 ft)
- Population (2023): 356
  - Density: 39.3/km^{2} (102/sq mi)
- Time zone: UTC+01:00 (CET)
  - Summer (DST): UTC+02:00 (CEST)
- INSEE/Postal code: 57251 /57420
- ^{1} French Land Register data, which excludes lakes, ponds, glaciers > 1 km^{2} (0.386 sq mi or 247 acres) and river estuaries.

Goin (French pronunciation: [ɡwɛ̃]; German: Göhn) is a commune in the Moselle department in Grand Est in north-eastern France.

== See also ==
- Communes of the Moselle department
