= Cheminot =

- Commune
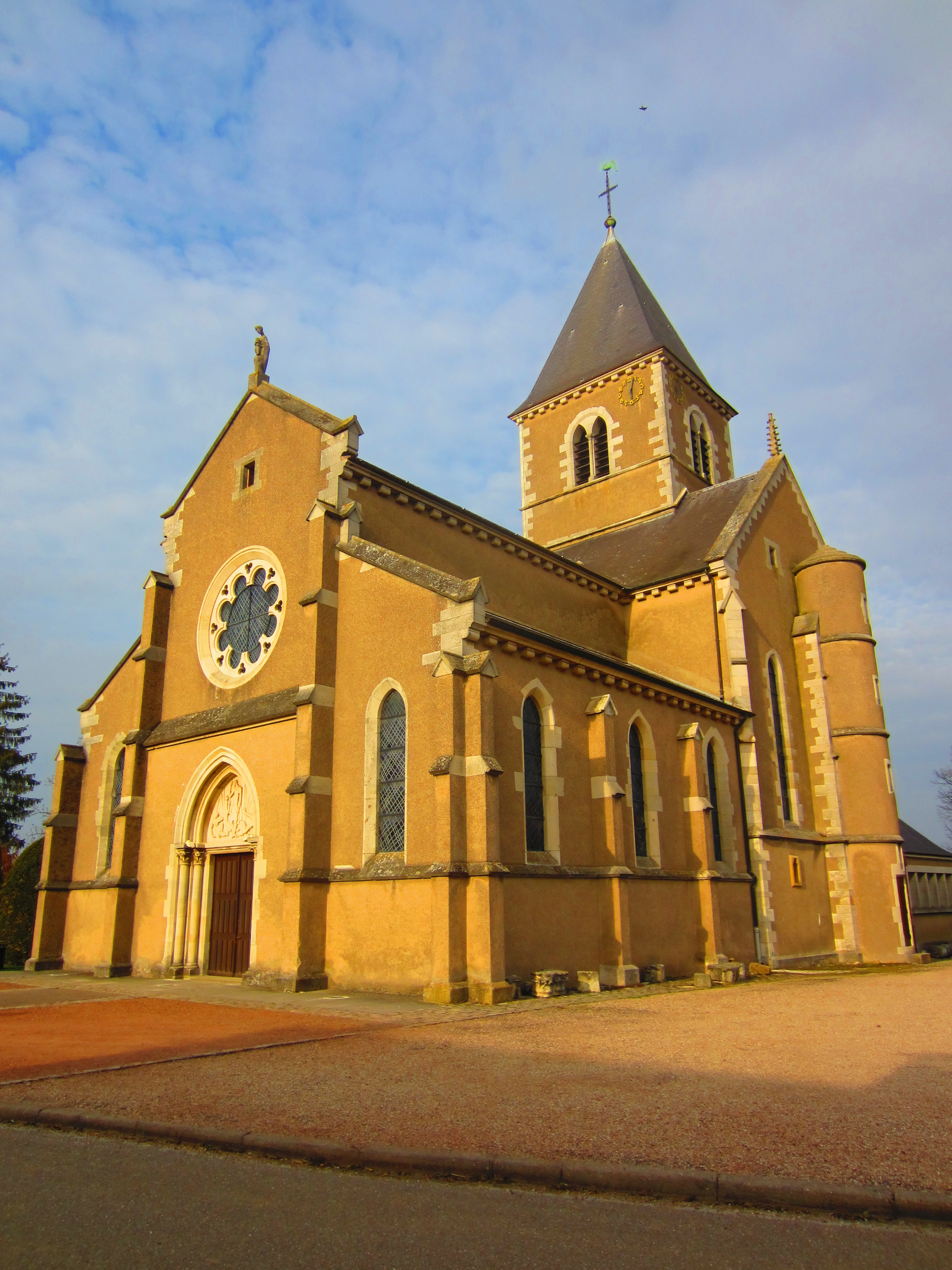
- The church in Cheminot

- Coat of arms
- Location of Cheminot
- Location within France Location within Grand Est
- Coordinates: 48°56′51″N 6°08′24″E
- Country: France
- Region: Grand Est
- Department: Moselle
- Arrondissement: Metz
- Canton: Faulquemont
- Intercommunality: Sud Messin

Government
  - Mayor (2020–2026): François Henot
- Area^{1}: 11.5 km^{2} (4.4 sq mi)
- Elevation: 180 m (590 ft)
- Highest elevation: 255 m (837 ft)
- Lowest elevation: 172 m (564 ft)
- Population (2023): 833
  - Density: 72.4/km^{2} (188/sq mi)
- Time zone: UTC+01:00 (CET)
  - Summer (DST): UTC+02:00 (CEST)
- INSEE/Postal code: 57137 /57420
- ^{1} French Land Register data, which excludes lakes, ponds, glaciers > 1 km^{2} (0.386 sq mi or 247 acres) and river estuaries.

Cheminot (French pronunciation: [ʃəmino]; German: Kemnat) is a commune in the Moselle department in Grand Est in north-eastern France.

== See also ==
- Communes of the Moselle department
