= Ancerville, Moselle =

Ancerville
- Commune
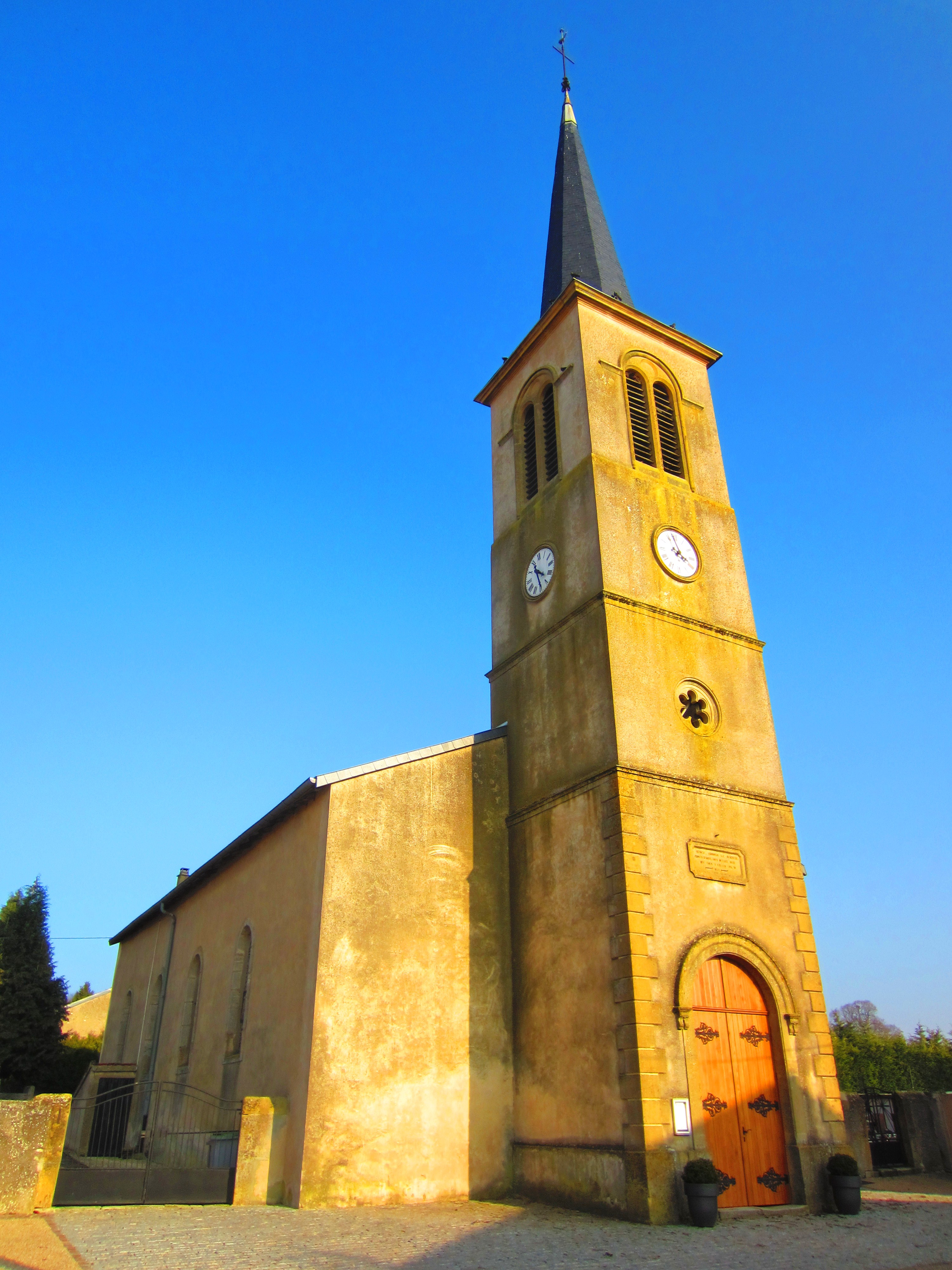
- The church in Ancerville

- Coat of arms
- Location of Ancerville
- Location within France Location within Grand Est
- Coordinates: 49°01′52″N 6°23′16″E
- Country: France
- Region: Grand Est
- Department: Moselle
- Arrondissement: Metz
- Canton: Faulquemont
- Intercommunality: Sud Messin

Government
  - Mayor (2020–2026): Patrick Angelaud
- Area^{1}: 5.23 km^{2} (2.02 sq mi)
- Highest elevation: 314 m (1,030 ft)
- Lowest elevation: 219 m (719 ft)
- Population (2023): 300
  - Density: 57/km^{2} (150/sq mi)
- Time zone: UTC+01:00 (CET)
  - Summer (DST): UTC+02:00 (CEST)
- INSEE/Postal code: 57020 /57580
- ^{1} French Land Register data, which excludes lakes, ponds, glaciers > 1 km^{2} (0.386 sq mi or 247 acres) and river estuaries.

Ancerville (French pronunciation: [ɑ̃sɛʁvil]; German: Anserweiler) is a commune in the Moselle department in Grand Est in northeastern France.

== Population ==
Historical population
Year	Pop.	±% p.a.
1968	209	—
1975	231	+1.44%
1982	238	+0.43%
1990	300	+2.94%
1999	266	−1.33%
2007	277	+0.51%
2012	262	−1.11%
2017	302	+2.88%
2023	300	−0.11%
Source: INSEE

== See also ==
- Communes of the Moselle department
