= Pournoy-la-Grasse =

- Commune
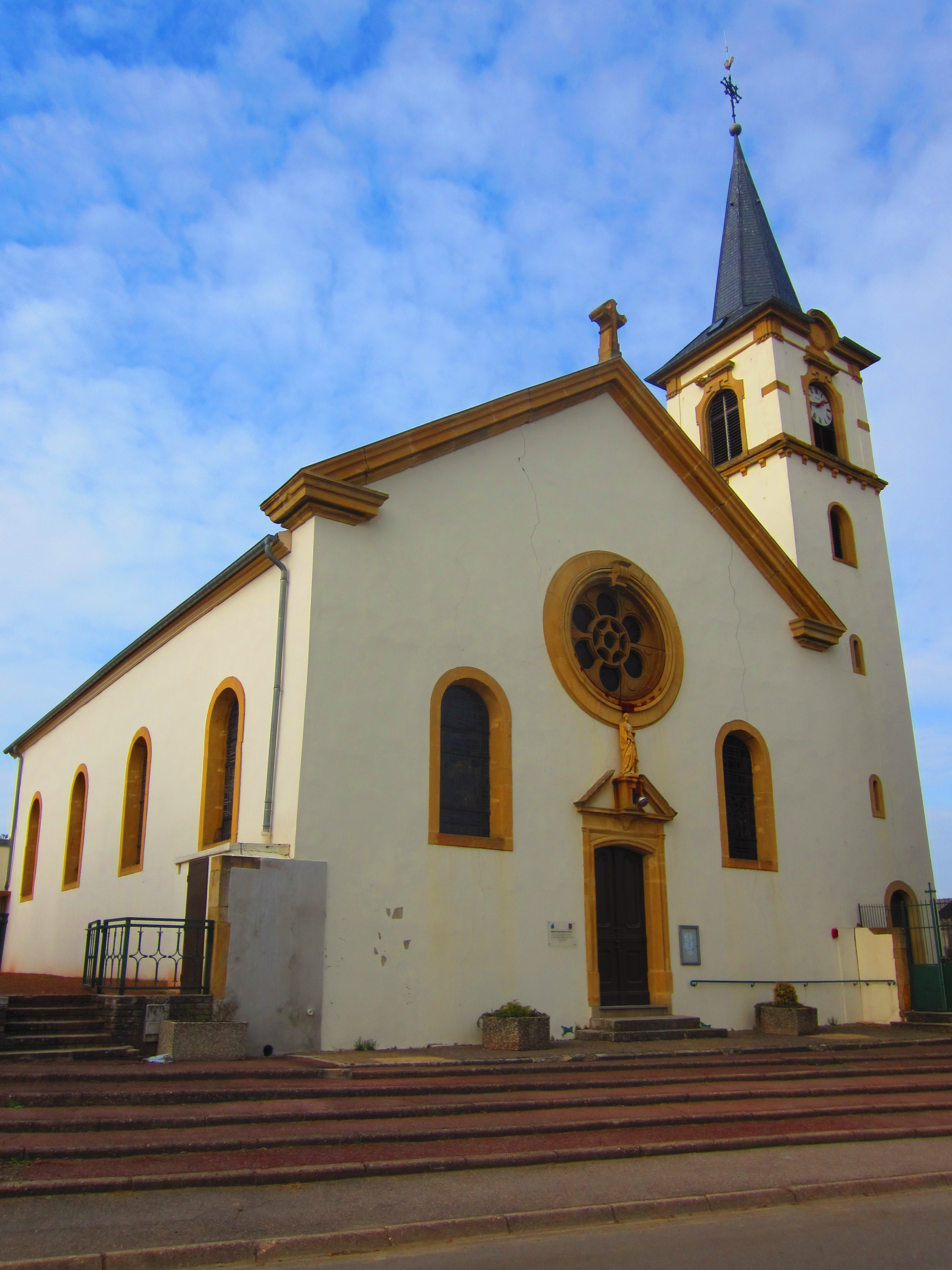
- The church in Pournoy-la-Grasse

- Coat of arms
- Location of Pournoy-la-Grasse
- Location within France Location within Grand Est
- Coordinates: 49°00′55″N 6°13′19″E
- Country: France
- Region: Grand Est
- Department: Moselle
- Arrondissement: Metz
- Canton: Faulquemont
- Intercommunality: Sud Messin

Government
  - Mayor (2020–2026): Socrate Palmieri
- Area^{1}: 7.19 km^{2} (2.78 sq mi)
- Elevation: 225 m (738 ft)
- Highest elevation: 246 m (807 ft)
- Lowest elevation: 172 m (564 ft)
- Population (2023): 767
  - Density: 107/km^{2} (276/sq mi)
- Time zone: UTC+01:00 (CET)
  - Summer (DST): UTC+02:00 (CEST)
- INSEE/Postal code: 57554 /57420
- ^{1} French Land Register data, which excludes lakes, ponds, glaciers > 1 km^{2} (0.386 sq mi or 247 acres) and river estuaries.

Pournoy-la-Grasse (French pronunciation: [puʁnwa la ɡʁas]; German: Großprunach) is a commune in the Moselle department in Grand Est in north-eastern France.

== See also ==
- Communes of the Moselle department
