= Buchy, Moselle =

Buchy
- Commune
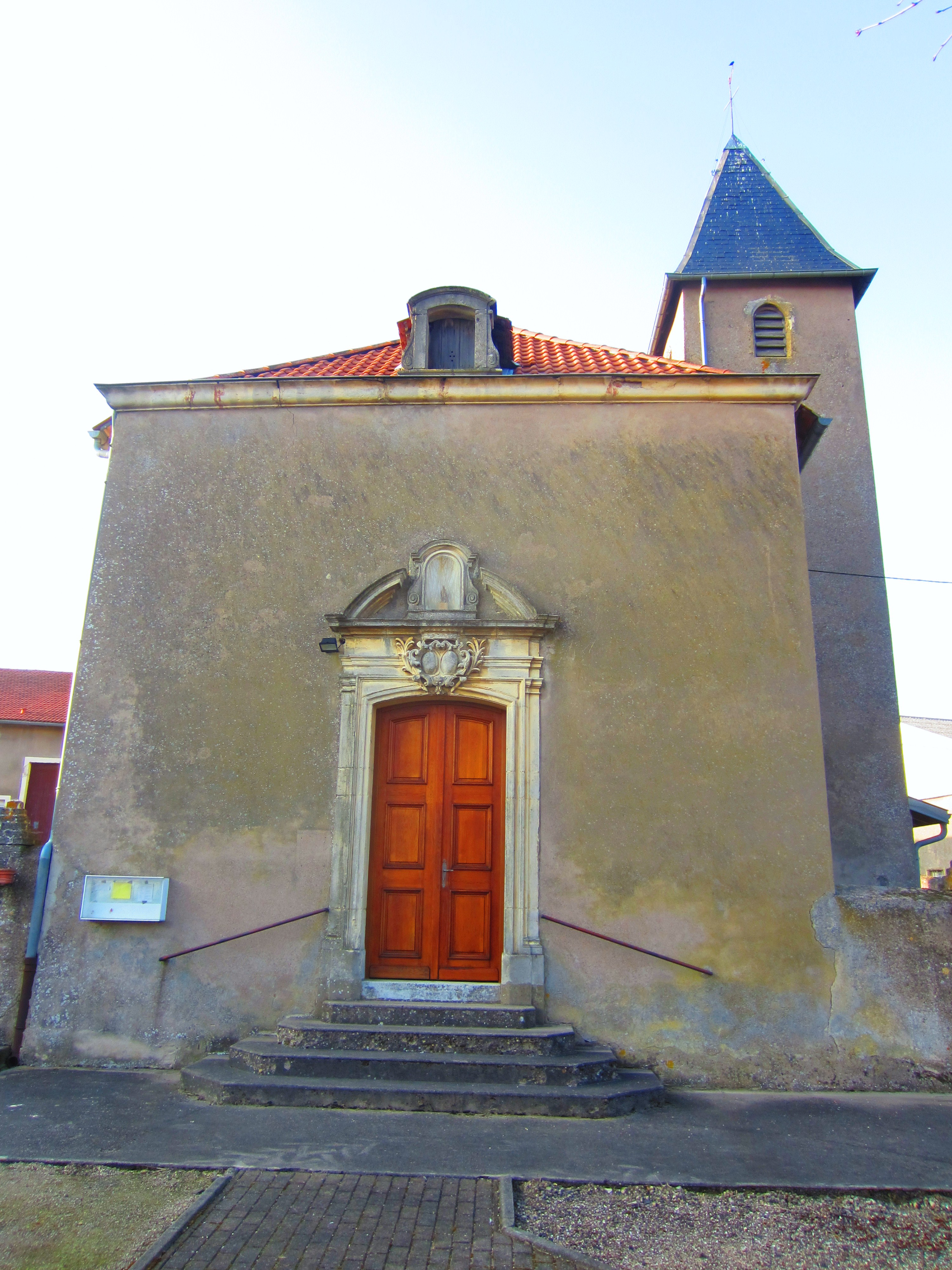
- The church in Buchy

- Coat of arms
- Location of Buchy
- Location within France Location within Grand Est
- Coordinates: 48°58′49″N 6°16′41″E
- Country: France
- Region: Grand Est
- Department: Moselle
- Arrondissement: Metz
- Canton: Faulquemont
- Intercommunality: Sud Messin

Government
  - Mayor (2020–2026): Christian Klein
- Area^{1}: 3.58 km^{2} (1.38 sq mi)
- Elevation: 282 m (925 ft)
- Highest elevation: 305 m (1,001 ft)
- Lowest elevation: 250 m (820 ft)
- Population (2023): 101
  - Density: 28.2/km^{2} (73.1/sq mi)
- Time zone: UTC+01:00 (CET)
  - Summer (DST): UTC+02:00 (CEST)
- INSEE/Postal code: 57116 /57420
- ^{1} French Land Register data, which excludes lakes, ponds, glaciers > 1 km^{2} (0.386 sq mi or 247 acres) and river estuaries.

Buchy (French pronunciation: [byʃi]; German: Buchingen) is a commune in the Moselle department in Grand Est in northeastern France.

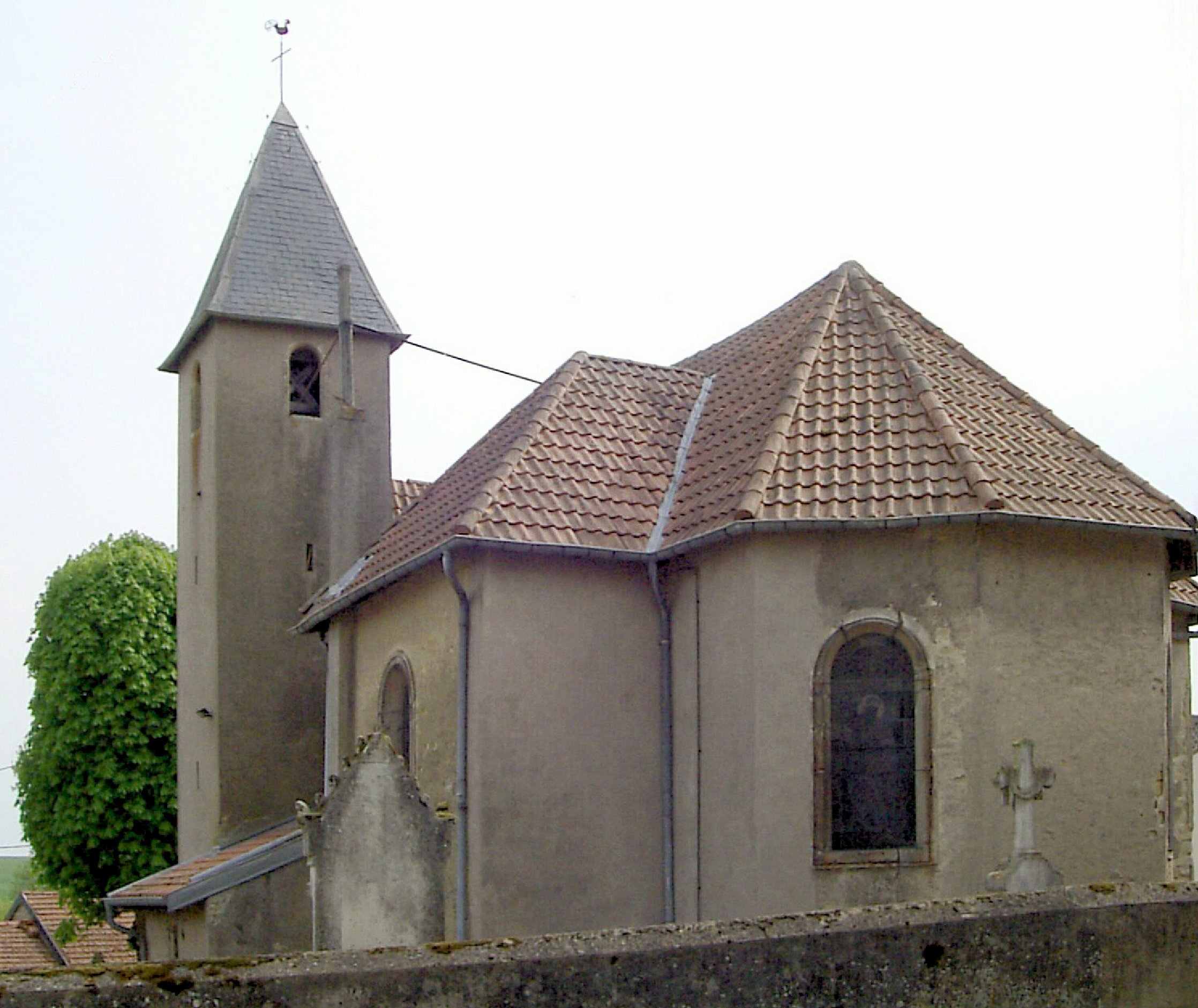
Saint-Pierre church

== Population ==
Historical population
Year	Pop.	±% p.a.
1968	83	—
1975	69	−2.60%
1982	86	+3.20%
1990	81	−0.75%
1999	76	−0.71%
2007	114	+5.20%
2012	119	+0.86%
2017	99	−3.61%
2023	101	+0.33%
Source: INSEE

== See also ==
- Communes of the Moselle department\
