= Coin-sur-Seille =

- Commune
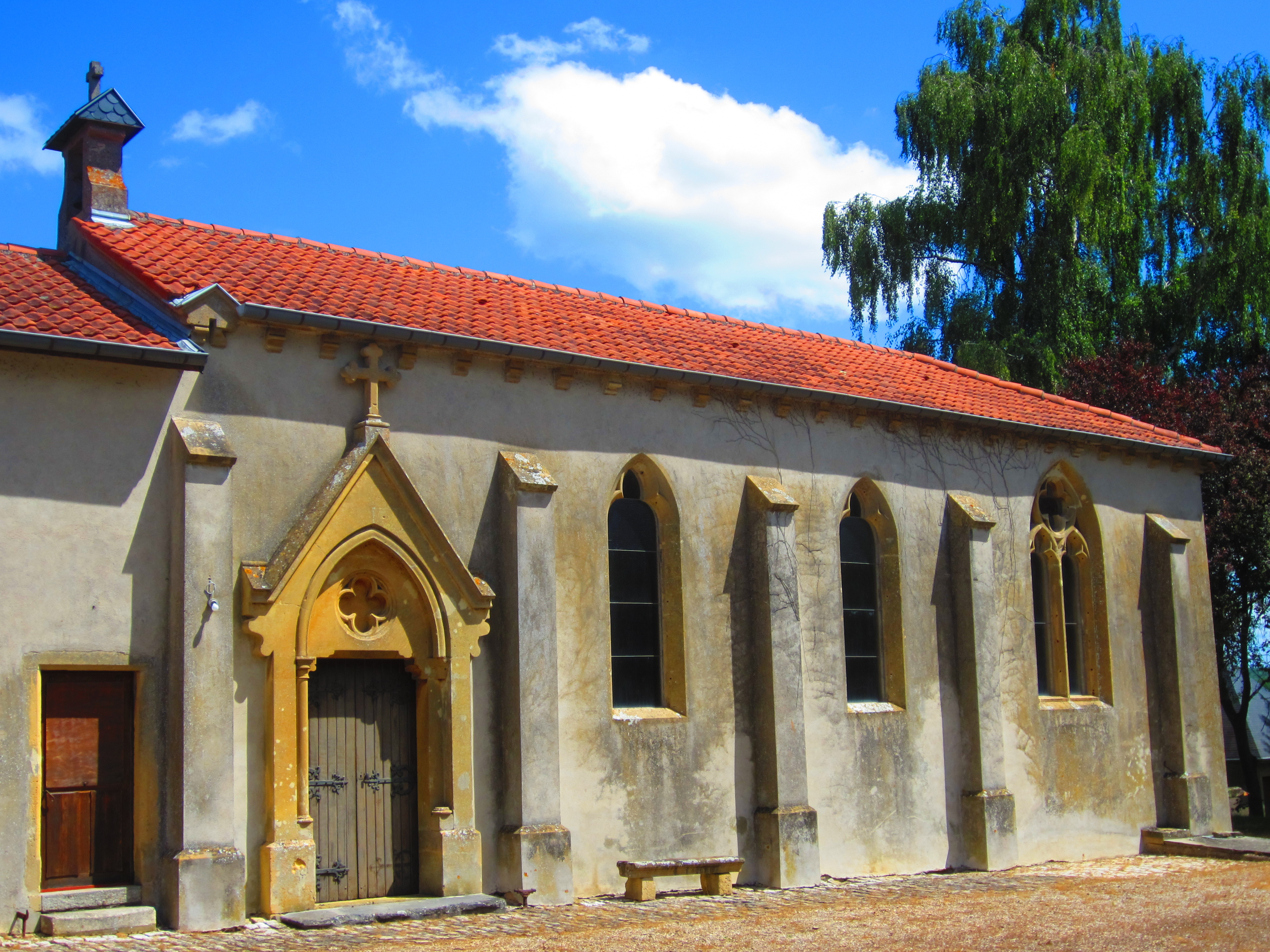
- The chapel in Coin-sur-Seille

- Coat of arms
- Location of Coin-sur-Seille
- Location within France Location within Grand Est
- Coordinates: 49°00′31″N 6°09′37″E
- Country: France
- Region: Grand Est
- Department: Moselle
- Arrondissement: Metz
- Canton: Les Coteaux de Moselle
- Intercommunality: Metz Métropole

Government
  - Mayor (2023–2026): Lydia Andreucci
- Area^{1}: 3.31 km^{2} (1.28 sq mi)
- Elevation: 191 m (627 ft)
- Highest elevation: 232 m (761 ft)
- Lowest elevation: 170 m (560 ft)
- Population (2023): 338
  - Density: 102/km^{2} (264/sq mi)
- Time zone: UTC+01:00 (CET)
  - Summer (DST): UTC+02:00 (CEST)
- INSEE/Postal code: 57147 /57420
- ^{1} French Land Register data, which excludes lakes, ponds, glaciers > 1 km^{2} (0.386 sq mi or 247 acres) and river estuaries.

Coin-sur-Seille (French pronunciation: [kwɛ̃ syʁ sɛj]; German: Selzeck) is a commune in the Moselle department in Grand Est in north-eastern France.

== See also ==
- Communes of the Moselle department
