= Theosophy of Tübingen =

The Theosophy of Tübingen is a manuscript of an epitome of the last four books of an earlier, lost Byzantine work of eleven books called simply Theosophy or On True Belief (Ancient Greek: Περι τῆς ὀρθῆς πίστεως). The original work contained seven books on the right way to keep faith, and ended with four books of appendices containing the testimonials of pagans to the Christian faith. Its name derives from Tübingen, the city in Germany where the surviving manuscript is kept, at the University Library of Tübingen.

== History ==
The original work dates from around the last quarter of the 5th century, while the epitome was probably composed no earlier than the 8th century.

The manuscript of this epitome is a simple paper codex consisting of 186 sheets written by the students of German classicist Martin Crusius, some time around 1579. The whereabouts of the manuscript were unknown for almost 300 years until German classicist Karl Johannes Neumann announced its rediscovery in 1881. The first revival after this discovery was by German classicist Karl Buresch, who published the Theosophy fragments as an appendix to his 1889 dissertation on the Apolline oracle of Claros (most of the oracles described in the epitome come from the shrines at Claros and Didyma).

Over the years different scholars have questioned the reliability of the oracles presented in the Theosophy and its epitome, but confidence in their reliability was shored up when in 1971 scholar Louis Robert unearthed an ancient inscription in Oenoanda, in Lycia, that precisely matched what was found in the epitome.

The structure of the epitome itself has been described as "strange and disorderly", and "unfaithful" to the original text, containing divergences where the epitomizer disagreed with the original text, which has led to attempts to use it, in conjunction with various other fragmentary remains, to reconstruct the original text which it epitomizes. Scholar Pier Franco Beatrice attempts to reconstruct this in his 2001 work Anonymi Monophysitae Theosophia.

== Rhetorical goals ==
The original work and its epitome primarily deal with prophesies and oracles that come from various non-Christian religious and spiritual traditions and are generally aligned with notions of Christian theosophy. These attempt to demonstrate that the oracles of the Greeks and Egyptians, and specifically the Sibylline Oracles, are not divergent belief systems but in fact fundamentally agreed with or even predicted the scripture of the New Testament on subjects like Biblical cosmology and the doctrine of the Trinity.

Both works are considered a direct descendant of the Christian apologetics of the fourth and fifth centuries, and shows roots in works such as The Divine Institutes by Lactantius and Praeparatio evangelica by Eusebius, among others, and it is believed to be intended as a refutation of the pro-pagan, anti-Christian tract Philosophy from Oracles (De Philosophia ex Oraculis Haurienda) by third-century philosopher Porphyry.

== Authorship ==
Over the years, different scholars have supposed this work to be the same (or mostly the same) as the lost work, also titled Theosophy, written by Aristocritus in the fifth century, but the general consensus is that these are entirely distinct works, and Aristocritus's Theosophy is truly lost. Different scholars have proposed the author of the original work to be Severus of Antioch, but there is also no broad support for these conjectures.
