= Aristocritus (writer) =

5th-century author

Aristocritus (Ancient Greek: Ἀριστόκριτος) was a Christian, Platonist writer of the fifth century who was the author of a work titled Theosophy, ostensibly about oracles, but in which he expressed a controversial syncretic belief that Christianity, Judaism, and Manichaeism were all basically the same. This belief caused him to be condemned by Zacharias Rhetor as well as in various later Byzantine texts. He is known to us primarily by his mention in a list of medieval anathemas, written around the year 1000, known as the Long Anathema, primarily aimed at Manichaeans. His identification as a Manichaean is however considered somewhat dubious, as he was known to write uncharitable things about Mani himself.

Theosophy is a lost work, though some scholars have identified this with the so-called Theosophy of Tübingen. Other scholars disagree that these are the same works.
