= Heracleodorus (1st century BCE) =

Heracleodorus (Ancient Greek: Ἡρακλεόδωρος) was a critic, writer, grammarian, or philosopher of some sort, whose views earned him criticism from several other writers of the ancient world. We only know of him from a small number of sources, but from their descriptions he seems to have been a well known and respected critic of his time. He is usually assumed to have lived in the 1st century BCE, but some scholars, notably Richard Janko, put his time as early as the 3rd century BCE.

He was criticized by Philodemus in his book on poetic theory written around the 1st century BCE, and might also be identical with the target of a work by the obscure writer Aristocritus titled Positions Against Heracleodorus, which is mentioned by the 2nd century theologian Clement of Alexandria.

== Critical views ==
The information we have about him is scant, so it is not entirely clear what even Heracleodorus's positions were what so irritated critics across the centuries. We know he was a comparatively radical "euphonist" (that is, he believed the thing that mattered most was how poetry sounded) and anti-genre critic, who favored erasing genre boundaries around the art. Philodemus mockingly rebuts this view by saying that if there were no boundaries around what was and was not poetry, this would mean even things like the speeches of Demosthenes and the prose of Xenophon were poetry, a claim which would make Heracleodorus a "raving lunatic".

Scholars have described the quotations we do have -- given by hostile critic Philodemus -- as mostly being rendered without context, and what we do have suggests they have at least some views in common, for example that artistic and moral judgments were separate (that is, it is possible to write a good poem about bad things).

Two other criticisms Philodemus makes shed some light on Heracleodorus's positions, or at least Heracleodorus's positions as Philodemus understood them. The first criticism is against Heracleodorus's support of "unclarity", the idea that even though a poem might not be clear to its audience in some way -- either because of devices like allegory, or because some of the words used were unknown to them -- it still has the power to emotionally move that audience. Heracleodorus apparently believed that audiences could and would be legitimately moved by poetry without always fully understanding what was going on.

The second criticism was against Heracleodorus's (supposed) claim that it was not the thoughts behind poetry that moved the audience, or at least not the thoughts alone. Heracleodorus's position, we are given to understand, was that the same thought expressed outside the context of poetry would not move an audience, or not move them in the same way, but that the thought expressed in poetry was granted a unique power to move its hearer.
