= Sailly-Achâtel =

- Commune
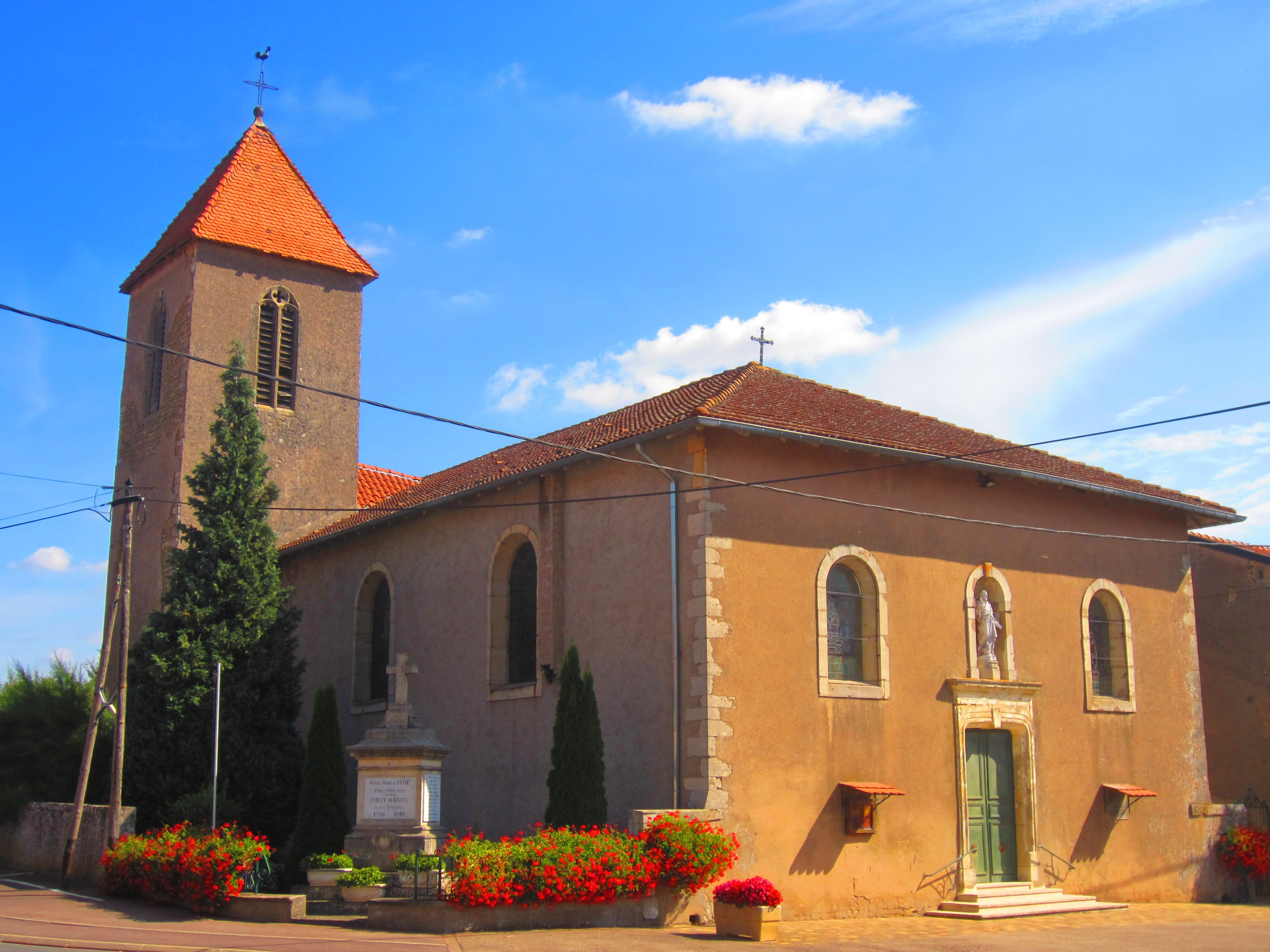
- The church in Sailly-Achâtel

- Coat of arms
- Location of Sailly-Achâtel
- Location within France Location within Grand Est
- Coordinates: 48°56′21″N 6°17′58″E
- Country: France
- Region: Grand Est
- Department: Moselle
- Arrondissement: Metz
- Canton: Le Saulnois
- Intercommunality: Sud Messin

Government
  - Mayor (2020–2026): Stéphane Nicolas
- Area^{1}: 8.18 km^{2} (3.16 sq mi)
- Elevation: 250 m (820 ft)
- Highest elevation: 308 m (1,010 ft)
- Lowest elevation: 214 m (702 ft)
- Population (2023): 324
  - Density: 39.6/km^{2} (103/sq mi)
- Time zone: UTC+01:00 (CET)
  - Summer (DST): UTC+02:00 (CEST)
- INSEE/Postal code: 57605 /57420
- ^{1} French Land Register data, which excludes lakes, ponds, glaciers > 1 km^{2} (0.386 sq mi or 247 acres) and river estuaries.

Sailly-Achâtel (French pronunciation: [saji aʃatɛl]; German: Sallach-Hohenschloß) is a commune in the Moselle department in Grand Est in north-eastern France.

== See also ==
- Communes of the Moselle department
