= Obervisse =

- Commune
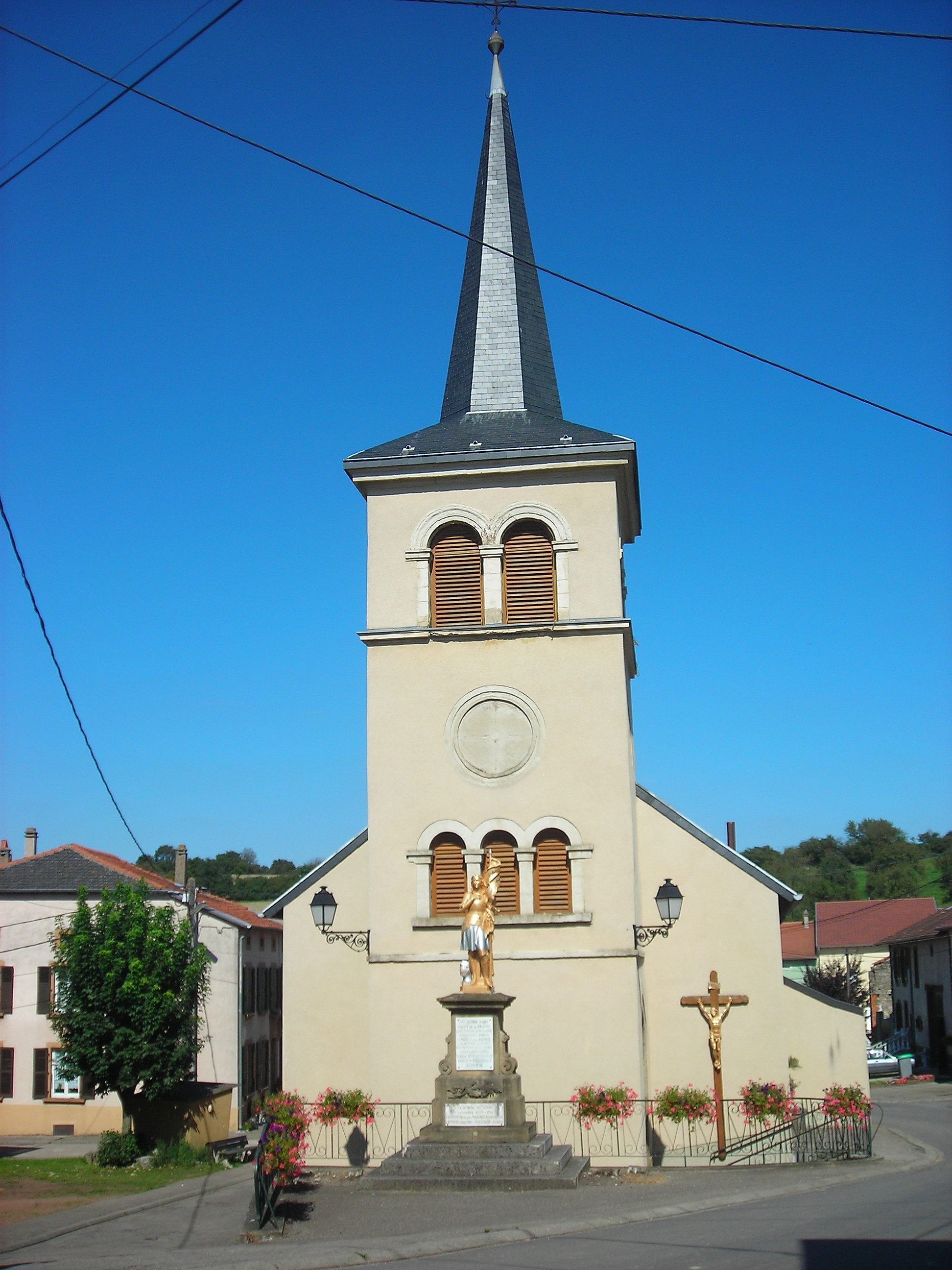
- Saint-Hubert church in Obervisse

- Coat of arms
- Location of Obervisse
- Location within France Location within Grand Est
- Coordinates: 49°09′09″N 6°35′10″E
- Country: France
- Region: Grand Est
- Department: Moselle
- Arrondissement: Forbach-Boulay-Moselle
- Canton: Boulay-Moselle
- Intercommunality: CC Houve-Pays Boulageois

Government
  - Mayor (2020–2026): Eddi Zyla
- Area^{1}: 4.4 km^{2} (1.7 sq mi)
- Elevation: 380 m (1,250 ft)
- Highest elevation: 411 m (1,348 ft)
- Lowest elevation: 327 m (1,073 ft)
- Population (2023): 154
  - Density: 35/km^{2} (91/sq mi)
- Time zone: UTC+01:00 (CET)
  - Summer (DST): UTC+02:00 (CEST)
- INSEE/Postal code: 57519 /57220
- ^{1} French Land Register data, which excludes lakes, ponds, glaciers > 1 km^{2} (0.386 sq mi or 247 acres) and river estuaries.

Obervisse (French pronunciation: [ɔbɛʁvis]; German: Oberwiese) is a commune in the Moselle department in Grand Est in north-eastern France. The similarly named commune Niedervisse lies 2 km to the northwest.

== See also ==
- Communes of the Moselle department
