= Niedervisse =

- Commune
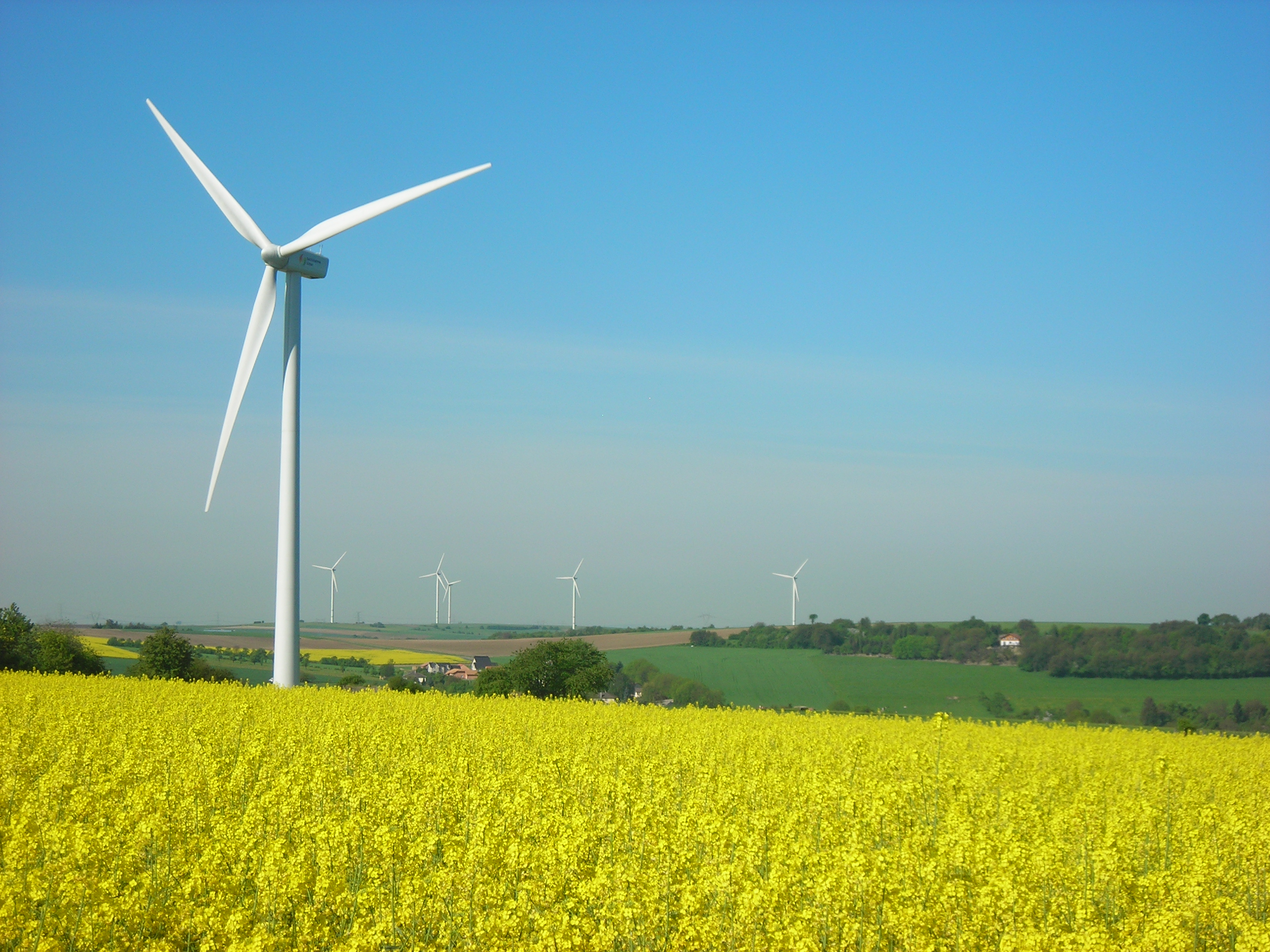
- The village and wind turbines

- Coat of arms
- Location of Niedervisse
- Location within France Location within Grand Est
- Coordinates: 49°10′04″N 6°34′10″E
- Country: France
- Region: Grand Est
- Department: Moselle
- Arrondissement: Forbach-Boulay-Moselle
- Canton: Boulay-Moselle
- Intercommunality: CC Houve-Pays Boulageois

Government
  - Mayor (2020–2026): Gérard Crusem
- Area^{1}: 5.77 km^{2} (2.23 sq mi)
- Elevation: 307 m (1,007 ft)
- Highest elevation: 385 m (1,263 ft)
- Lowest elevation: 289 m (948 ft)
- Population (2023): 279
  - Density: 48.4/km^{2} (125/sq mi)
- Time zone: UTC+01:00 (CET)
  - Summer (DST): UTC+02:00 (CEST)
- INSEE/Postal code: 57507 /57220
- ^{1} French Land Register data, which excludes lakes, ponds, glaciers > 1 km^{2} (0.386 sq mi or 247 acres) and river estuaries.

Niedervisse (French pronunciation: [nidɛʁvis]; German: Niederwiese) is a commune in the Moselle department in Grand Est in north-eastern France. The similarly named commune Obervisse lies 2 km to the southeast.

== See also ==
- Communes of the Moselle department
