= Guinglange =

- Commune
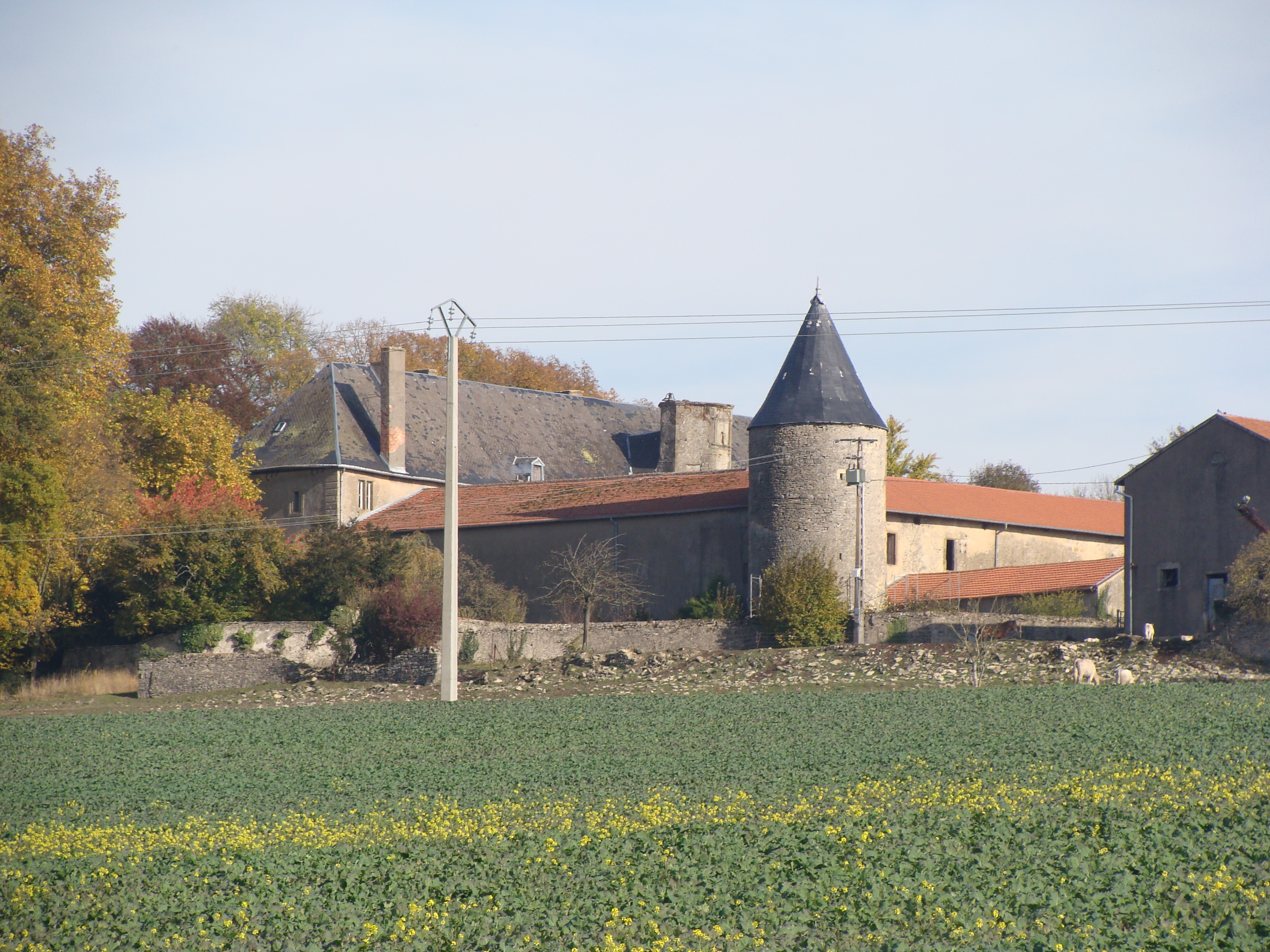
- Helfedange castle

- Coat of arms
- Location of Guinglange
- Location within France Location within Grand Est
- Coordinates: 49°04′27″N 6°31′37″E
- Country: France
- Region: Grand Est
- Department: Moselle
- Arrondissement: Forbach-Boulay-Moselle
- Canton: Faulquemont
- Intercommunality: CC du District Urbain de Faulquemont

Government
  - Mayor (2020–2026): Eric Burtard
- Area^{1}: 10.38 km^{2} (4.01 sq mi)
- Elevation: 234 m (768 ft)
- Highest elevation: 308 m (1,010 ft)
- Lowest elevation: 222 m (728 ft)
- Population (2023): 322
  - Density: 31.0/km^{2} (80.3/sq mi)
- Time zone: UTC+01:00 (CET)
  - Summer (DST): UTC+02:00 (CEST)
- INSEE/Postal code: 57276 /57690
- ^{1} French Land Register data, which excludes lakes, ponds, glaciers > 1 km^{2} (0.386 sq mi or 247 acres) and river estuaries.

Guinglange (French pronunciation: [ɡɛ̃ɡlɑ̃ʒ]; German: Gänglingen; Lorraine Franconian Genglingen) is a commune in the Moselle department in Grand Est in north-eastern France.

== See also ==
- Communes of the Moselle department
