= Marsilly =

Marsilly is the name of the following communes in France:

- Marsilly, Charente-Maritime, in the Charente-Maritime department
- Marsilly, Moselle, in the Moselle department
