= Ennery =

Ennery may refer to:

== Places ==
France

- Ennery, Moselle, a commune in the Moselle department
- Ennery, Val-d'Oise, a commune in the Val-d'Oise department
- Chailly-lès-Ennery, a commune in the Moselle department

Haiti

- Ennery, Artibonite, a commune in the Artibonite department

== See also ==
- Adolphe d'Ennery (1811–1899), a French dramatist and novelist
