= Servigny-lès-Raville =

- Commune
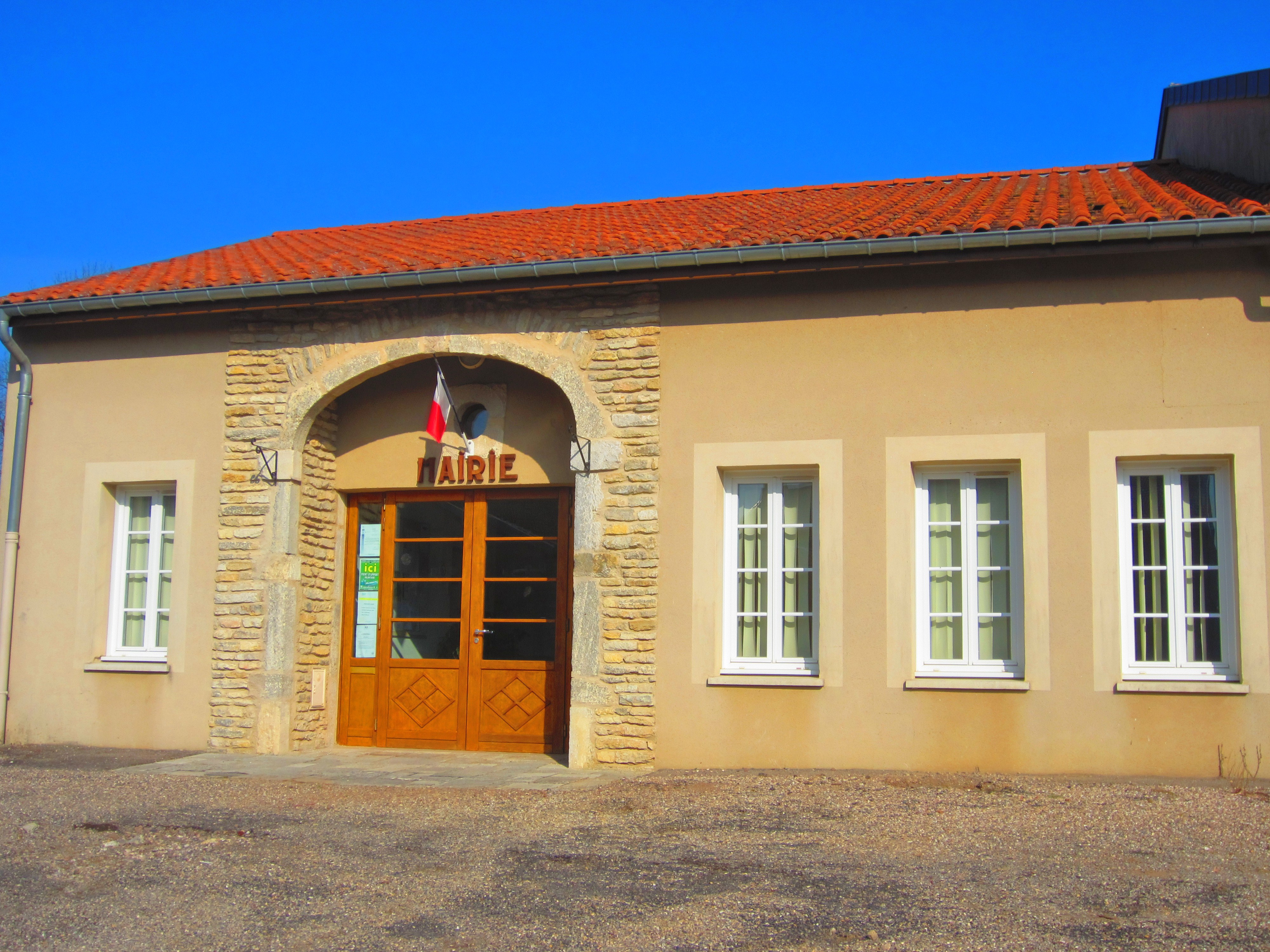
- The town hall in Servigny-lès-Raville

- Coat of arms
- Location of Servigny-lès-Raville
- Location within France Location within Grand Est
- Coordinates: 49°04′45″N 6°27′09″E
- Country: France
- Region: Grand Est
- Department: Moselle
- Arrondissement: Metz
- Canton: Le Pays Messin
- Intercommunality: Haut Chemin - Pays de Pange

Government
  - Mayor (2021–2026): Raphaël Dupont
- Area^{1}: 14.2 km^{2} (5.5 sq mi)
- Highest elevation: 344 m (1,129 ft)
- Lowest elevation: 229 m (751 ft)
- Population (2023): 476
  - Density: 33.5/km^{2} (86.8/sq mi)
- Time zone: UTC+01:00 (CET)
  - Summer (DST): UTC+02:00 (CEST)
- INSEE/Postal code: 57648 /57530
- ^{1} French Land Register data, which excludes lakes, ponds, glaciers > 1 km^{2} (0.386 sq mi or 247 acres) and river estuaries.

Servigny-lès-Raville (French pronunciation: [sɛʁviɲi lɛ ʁavil], literally Servigny near Raville; German: Silbernachen) is a commune in the Moselle department in Grand Est in north-eastern France.

== See also ==
- Communes of the Moselle department
