= Canton of Le Pays Messin =

Coordinates: 49.11°N 6.41°E

The canton of Le Pays Messin is an administrative division of the Moselle department, northeastern France. It was created at the French canton reorganisation which came into effect in March 2015. Its seat is in Courcelles-Chaussy.

It consists of the following communes:

1. Antilly
2. Argancy
3. Ars-Laquenexy
4. Ay-sur-Moselle
5. Bazoncourt
6. Burtoncourt
7. Chailly-lès-Ennery
8. Charleville-sous-Bois
9. Charly-Oradour
10. Chesny
11. Chieulles
12. Coincy
13. Colligny-Maizery
14. Courcelles-Chaussy
15. Courcelles-sur-Nied
16. Ennery
17. Les Étangs
18. Failly
19. Flévy
20. Glatigny
21. Hayes
22. Jury
23. Laquenexy
24. Maizeroy
25. Malroy
26. Marsilly
27. Mécleuves
28. Mey
29. Noisseville
30. Nouilly
31. Ogy-Montoy-Flanville
32. Pange
33. Peltre
34. Raville
35. Retonfey
36. Sainte-Barbe
37. Saint-Hubert
38. Saint-Julien-lès-Metz
39. Sanry-lès-Vigy
40. Sanry-sur-Nied
41. Servigny-lès-Raville
42. Servigny-lès-Sainte-Barbe
43. Silly-sur-Nied
44. Sorbey
45. Trémery
46. Vantoux
47. Vany
48. Vigy
49. Vry
