= Les Étangs =

- Commune
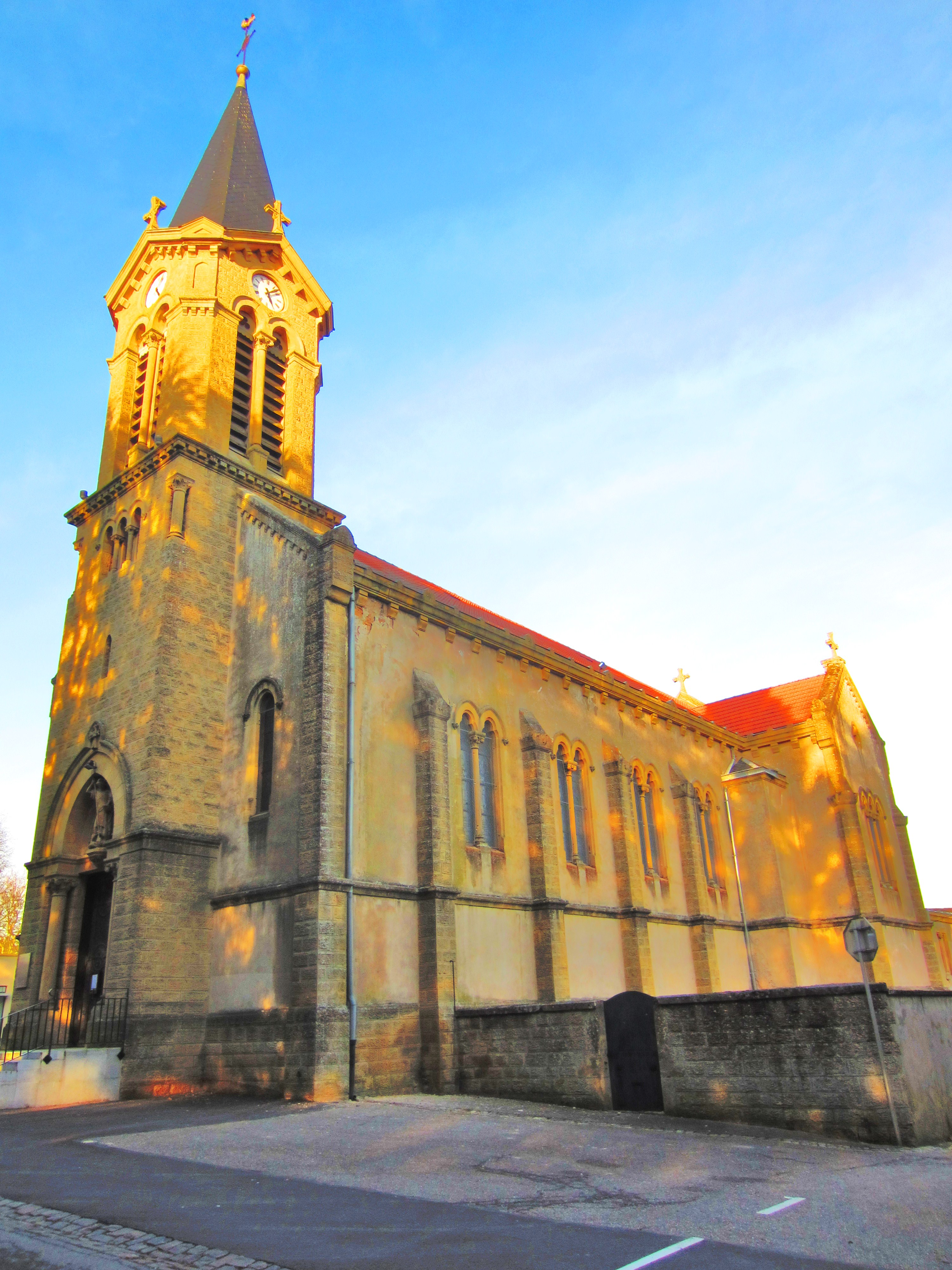
- The church in Les Étangs

- Coat of arms
- Location of Les Étangs
- Location within France Location within Grand Est
- Coordinates: 49°08′35″N 6°22′50″E
- Country: France
- Region: Grand Est
- Department: Moselle
- Arrondissement: Metz
- Canton: Le Pays Messin
- Intercommunality: Haut Chemin - Pays de Pange

Government
  - Mayor (2020–2026): Yves Legendre
- Area^{1}: 6.05 km^{2} (2.34 sq mi)
- Elevation: 218 m (715 ft)
- Highest elevation: 304 m (997 ft)
- Lowest elevation: 207 m (679 ft)
- Population (2023): 421
  - Density: 69.6/km^{2} (180/sq mi)
- Time zone: UTC+01:00 (CET)
  - Summer (DST): UTC+02:00 (CEST)
- INSEE/Postal code: 57200 /57530
- ^{1} French Land Register data, which excludes lakes, ponds, glaciers > 1 km^{2} (0.386 sq mi or 247 acres) and river estuaries.

Les Étangs (French pronunciation: [le.z‿etɑ̃]; German: Tennschen) is a commune in the Moselle department in Grand Est in north-eastern France.

== See also ==
- Communes of the Moselle department
