= Retonfey =

- Commune
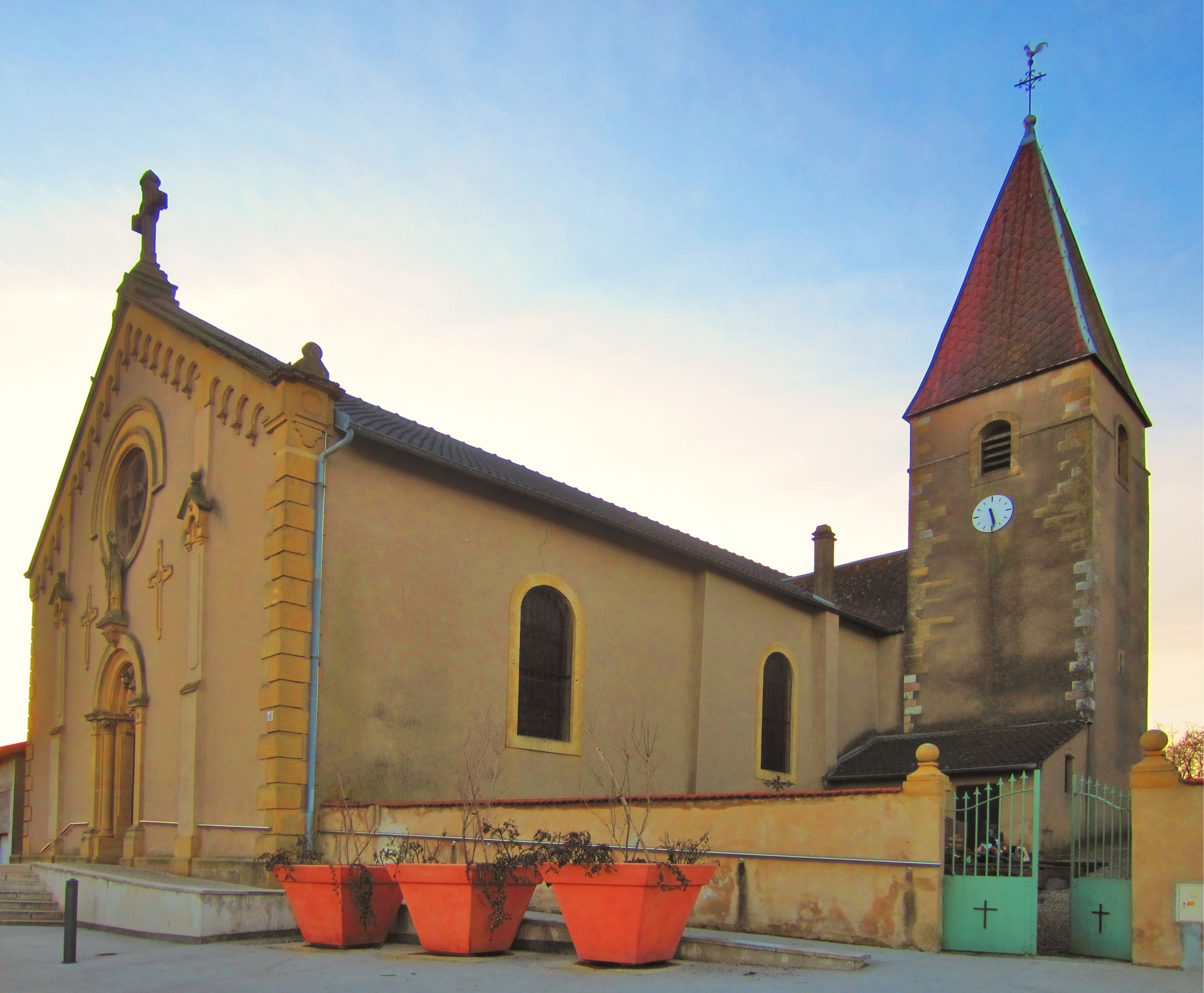
- The church in Retonfey

- Coat of arms
- Location of Retonfey
- Location within France Location within Grand Est
- Coordinates: 49°08′13″N 6°18′21″E
- Country: France
- Region: Grand Est
- Department: Moselle
- Arrondissement: Metz
- Canton: Le Pays Messin
- Intercommunality: Haut Chemin - Pays de Pange

Government
  - Mayor (2020–2026): Christian Petit
- Area^{1}: 9.77 km^{2} (3.77 sq mi)
- Elevation: 200 m (660 ft)
- Highest elevation: 286 m (938 ft)
- Lowest elevation: 215 m (705 ft)
- Population (2023): 1,327
  - Density: 136/km^{2} (352/sq mi)
- Time zone: UTC+01:00 (CET)
  - Summer (DST): UTC+02:00 (CEST)
- INSEE/Postal code: 57575 /57645
- ^{1} French Land Register data, which excludes lakes, ponds, glaciers > 1 km^{2} (0.386 sq mi or 247 acres) and river estuaries.

Retonfey (French pronunciation: [ʁətɔ̃fɛ]; German: Raitenbuchen) is a commune in the Moselle department in Grand Est in north-eastern France.

== See also ==
- Communes of the Moselle department
