= Bazoncourt =

- Commune
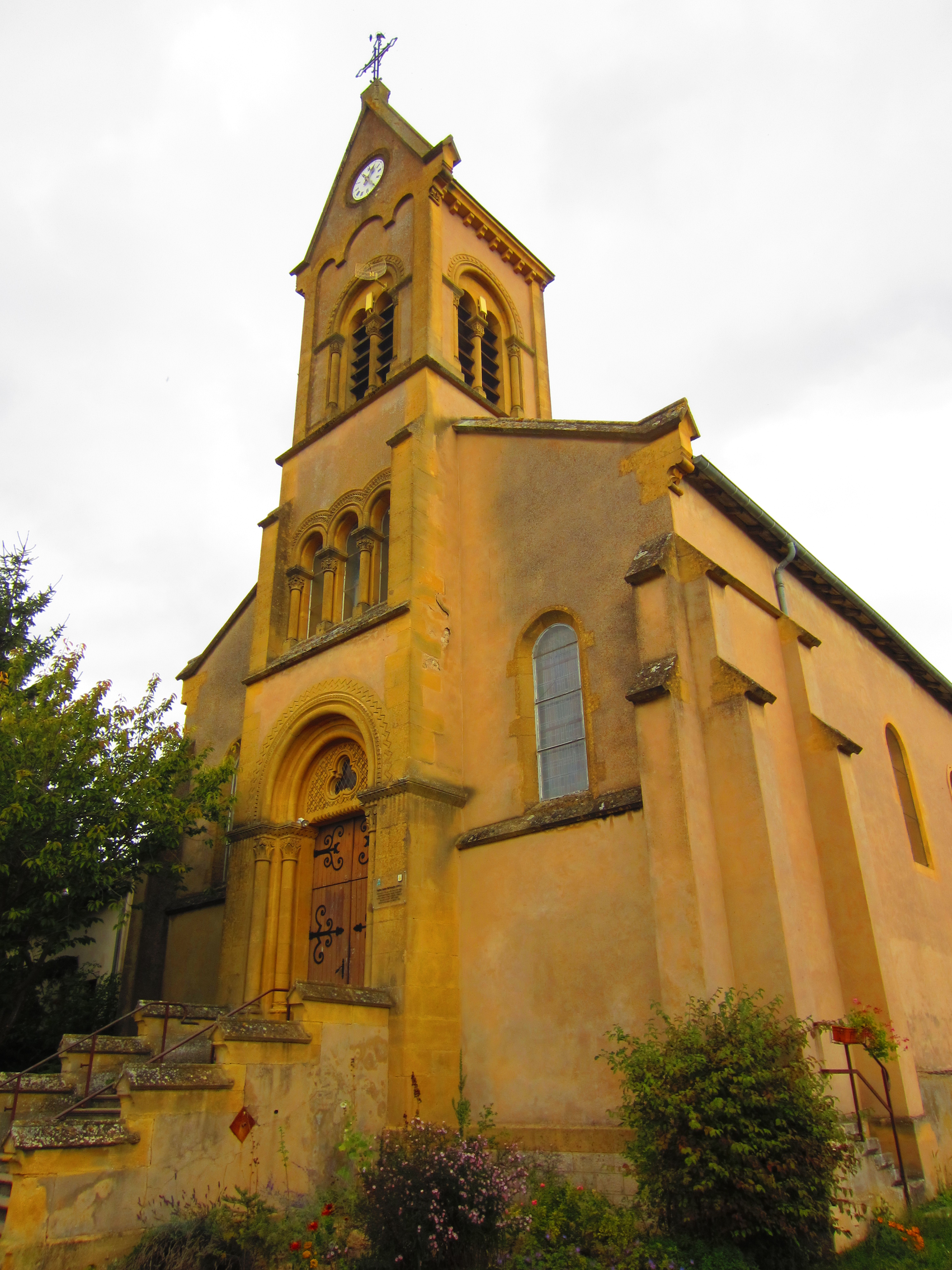
- The church in Bazoncourt

- Coat of arms
- Location of Bazoncourt
- Location within France Location within Grand Est
- Coordinates: 49°03′06″N 6°22′05″E
- Country: France
- Region: Grand Est
- Department: Moselle
- Arrondissement: Metz
- Canton: Le Pays Messin

Government
  - Mayor (2020–2026): Dominique Bertrand
- Area^{1}: 13.21 km^{2} (5.10 sq mi)
- Elevation: 275 m (902 ft)
- Highest elevation: 337 m (1,106 ft)
- Lowest elevation: 215 m (705 ft)
- Population (2023): 526
  - Density: 39.8/km^{2} (103/sq mi)
- Time zone: UTC+01:00 (CET)
  - Summer (DST): UTC+02:00 (CEST)
- INSEE/Postal code: 57055 /57530
- ^{1} French Land Register data, which excludes lakes, ponds, glaciers > 1 km^{2} (0.386 sq mi or 247 acres) and river estuaries.

Bazoncourt (French pronunciation: [bazɔ̃kuʁ]; German: Basonhofen) is a commune in the Moselle department in Grand Est in northeastern France.

== Population ==
Historical population
Year	Pop.	±% p.a.
1968	265	—
1975	271	+0.32%
1982	421	+6.50%
1990	433	+0.35%
1999	469	+0.89%
2007	481	+0.32%
2012	510	+1.18%
2017	540	+1.15%
2023	526	−0.44%
Source: INSEE

== See also ==
- Communes of the Moselle department
