= Sanry-lès-Vigy =

- Commune
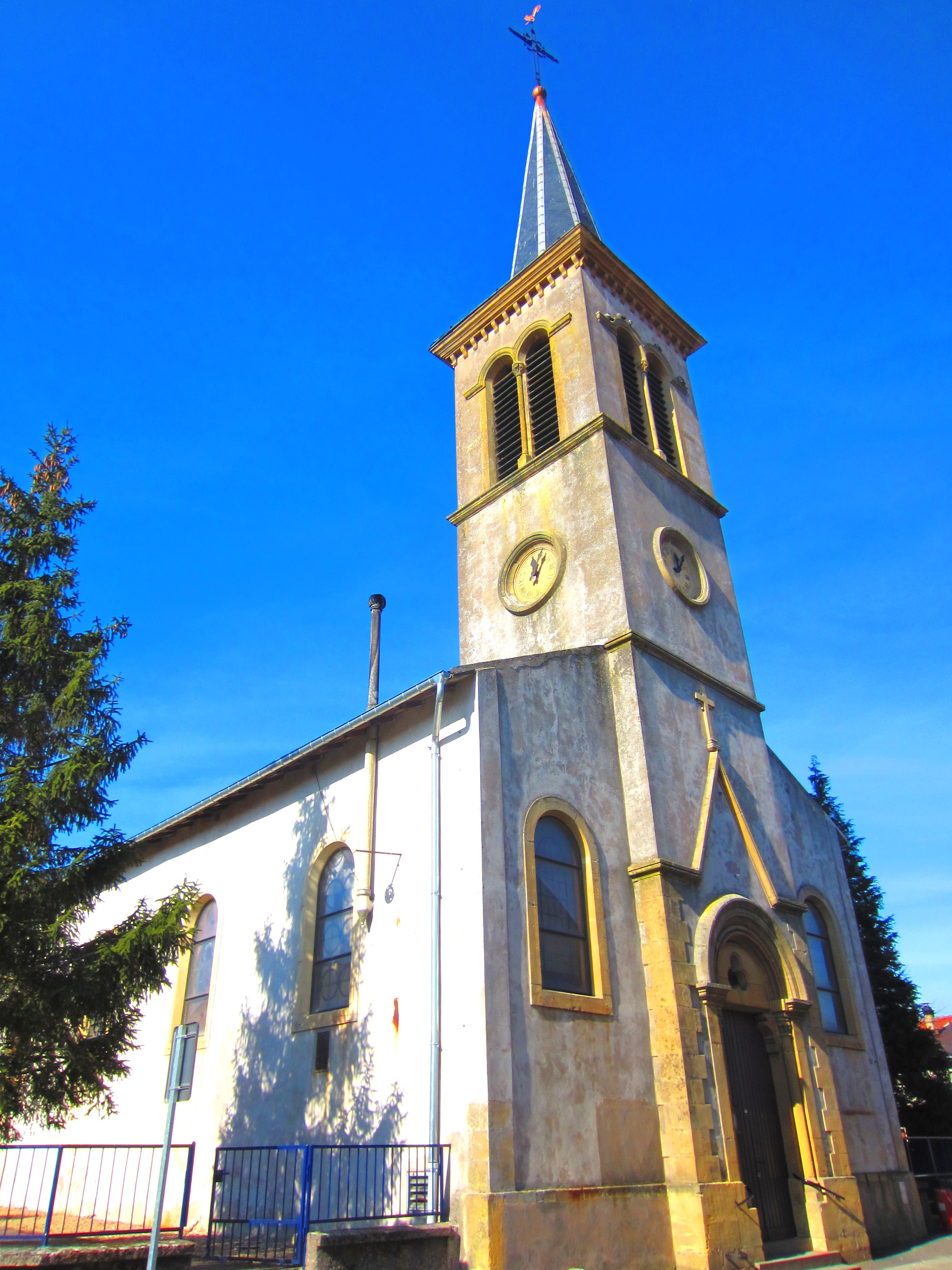
- The church in Sanry-lès-Vigy

- Coat of arms
- Location of Sanry-lès-Vigy
- Location within France Location within Grand Est
- Coordinates: 49°11′02″N 6°16′54″E
- Country: France
- Region: Grand Est
- Department: Moselle
- Arrondissement: Metz
- Canton: Le Pays Messin
- Intercommunality: Haut Chemin - Pays de Pange

Government
  - Mayor (2020–2026): Lionel Guiraut
- Area^{1}: 5.55 km^{2} (2.14 sq mi)
- Elevation: 238 m (781 ft)
- Highest elevation: 277 m (909 ft)
- Lowest elevation: 185 m (607 ft)
- Population (2023): 507
  - Density: 91.4/km^{2} (237/sq mi)
- Time zone: UTC+01:00 (CET)
  - Summer (DST): UTC+02:00 (CEST)
- INSEE/Postal code: 57626 /57640
- ^{1} French Land Register data, which excludes lakes, ponds, glaciers > 1 km^{2} (0.386 sq mi or 247 acres) and river estuaries.

Sanry-lès-Vigy (French pronunciation: [sɑ̃ʁi lɛ viʒi], literally Sanry near Vigy; German: Sanringen bei Wigingen) is a commune in the Moselle department in Grand Est in north-eastern France.

As of 2021, Sanry-lès-Vigy has a population of 515 residents, with a population density of approximately 93 inhabitants per square kilometer.

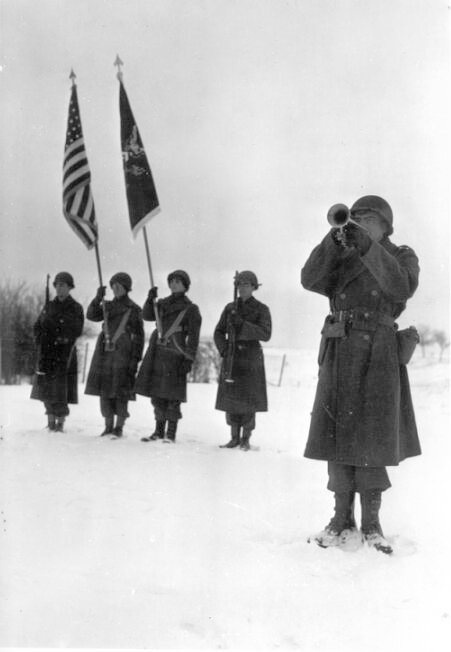
Memorial ceremony for men of Company C, 9th Armored Engineer Battalion. Who were killed during siege of Bastogne, Belgium. Ceremony was held 22 January 1945 at Sarny Les Vigy France. Bugler sounds "taps" as the color guard stands at attention. XX Corps, U.S. Third Army at Carny Les vigy, France, Source US Army

== See also ==
- Communes of the Moselle department
