= Courcelles-sur-Nied =

- Commune
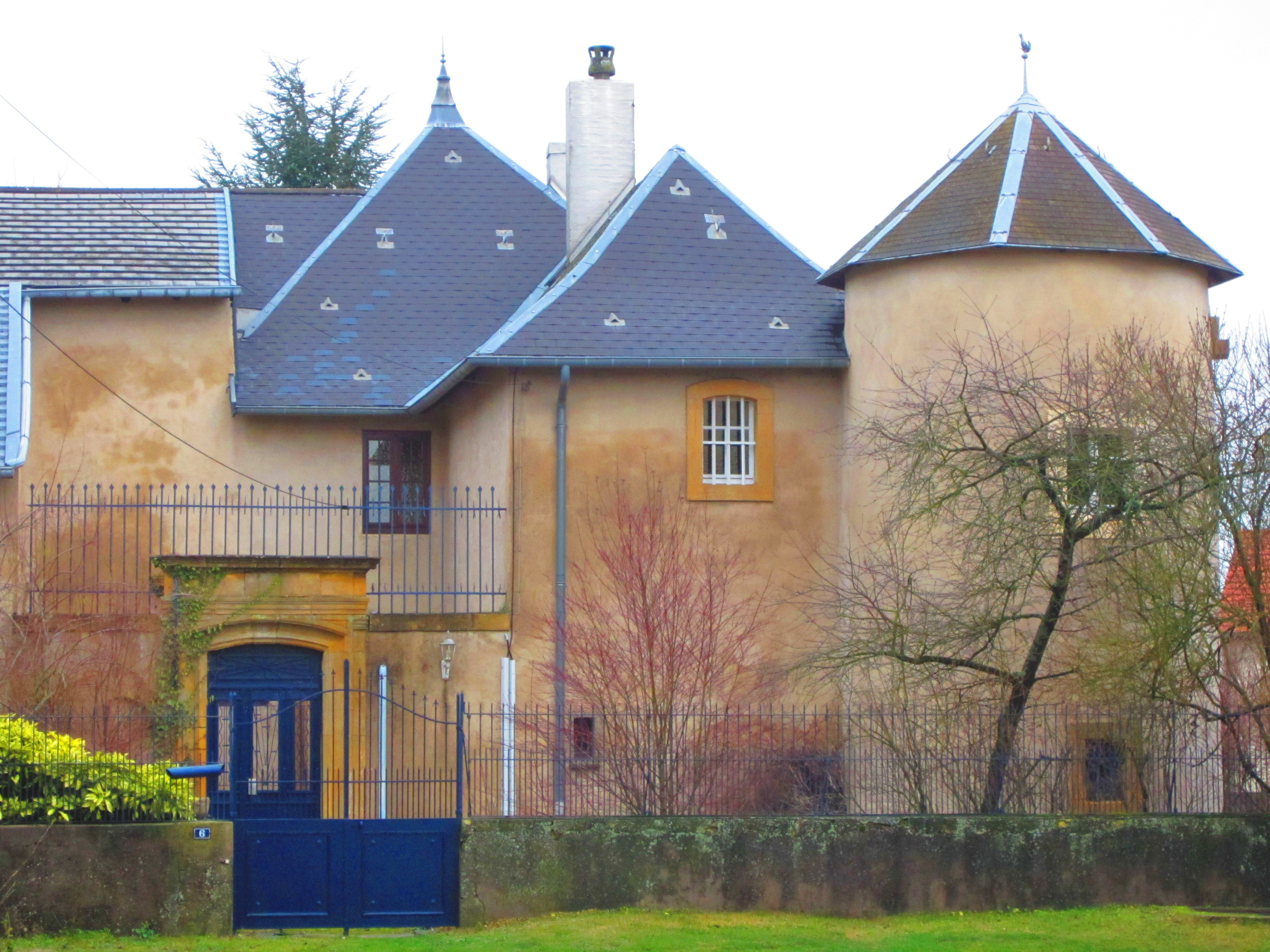
- The chateau in Courcelles-sur-Nied

- Coat of arms
- Location of Courcelles-sur-Nied
- Location within France Location within Grand Est
- Coordinates: 49°04′01″N 6°18′30″E
- Country: France
- Region: Grand Est
- Department: Moselle
- Arrondissement: Metz
- Canton: Le Pays Messin
- Intercommunality: Haut Chemin - Pays de Pange

Government
  - Mayor (2020–2026): Fabrice Muller
- Area^{1}: 5.06 km^{2} (1.95 sq mi)
- Elevation: 240 m (790 ft)
- Highest elevation: 265 m (869 ft)
- Lowest elevation: 215 m (705 ft)
- Population (2023): 1,194
  - Density: 236/km^{2} (611/sq mi)
- Time zone: UTC+01:00 (CET)
  - Summer (DST): UTC+02:00 (CEST)
- INSEE/Postal code: 57156 /57530
- ^{1} French Land Register data, which excludes lakes, ponds, glaciers > 1 km^{2} (0.386 sq mi or 247 acres) and river estuaries.

Courcelles-sur-Nied (French pronunciation: [kuʁsɛl syʁ nje], literally Courcelles on Nied; German: Kurzel an der Nied) is a commune in the Moselle department in Grand Est in north-eastern France.

== See also ==
- Communes of the Moselle department
