= Maizeroy =

- Commune
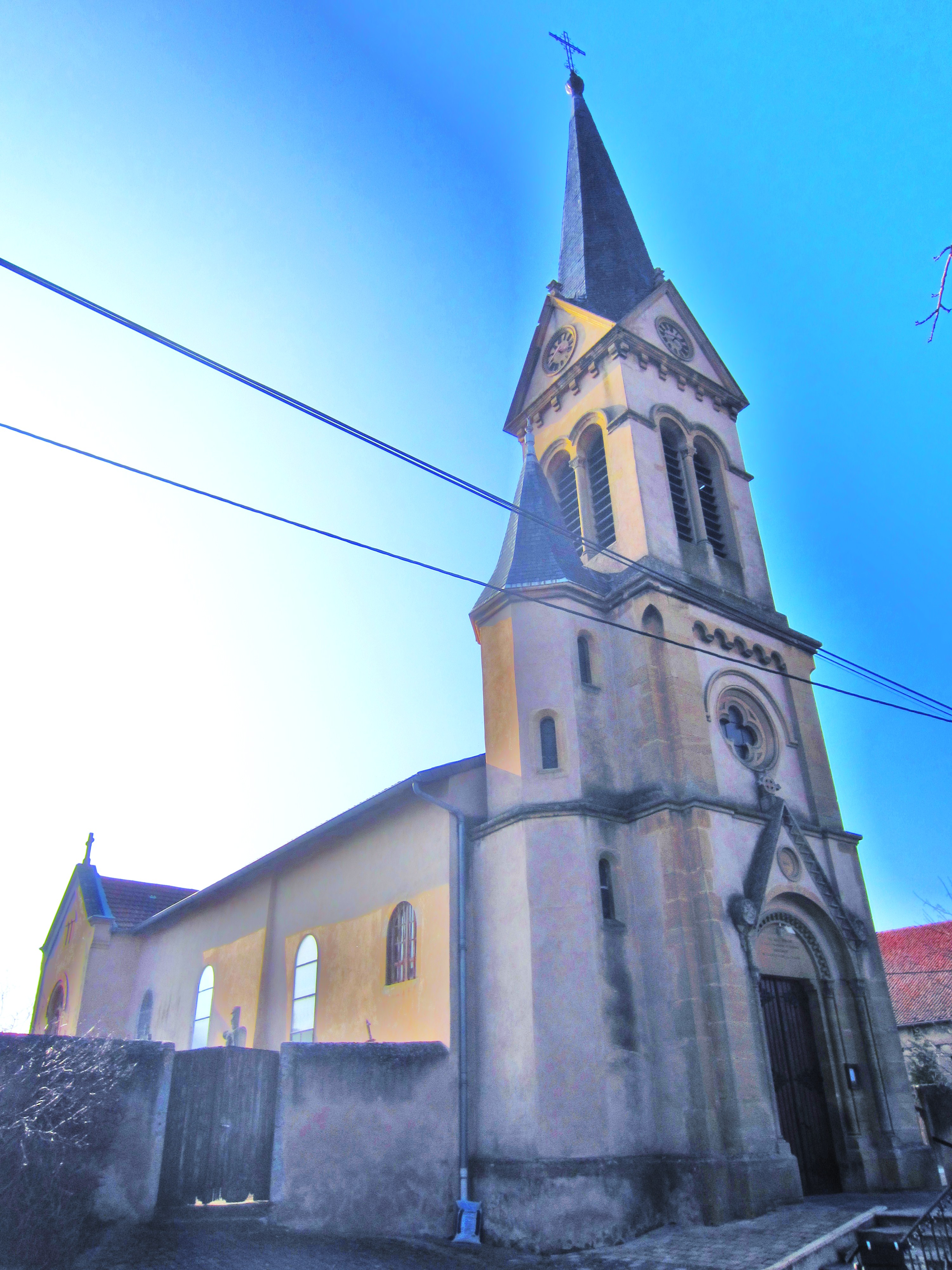
- The church in Maizeroy

- Coat of arms
- Location of Maizeroy
- Location within France Location within Grand Est
- Coordinates: 49°05′08″N 6°23′30″E
- Country: France
- Region: Grand Est
- Department: Moselle
- Arrondissement: Metz
- Canton: Le Pays Messin
- Intercommunality: Haut Chemin - Pays de Pange

Government
  - Mayor (2020–2026): Jean-François Leidelinger
- Area^{1}: 8.73 km^{2} (3.37 sq mi)
- Elevation: 245 m (804 ft)
- Highest elevation: 325 m (1,066 ft)
- Lowest elevation: 212 m (696 ft)
- Population (2023): 410
  - Density: 47/km^{2} (120/sq mi)
- Time zone: UTC+01:00 (CET)
  - Summer (DST): UTC+02:00 (CEST)
- INSEE/Postal code: 57431 /57530
- ^{1} French Land Register data, which excludes lakes, ponds, glaciers > 1 km^{2} (0.386 sq mi or 247 acres) and river estuaries.

Maizeroy (French pronunciation: [mɛzʁwa]; German: Macherich) is a commune in the Moselle department in Grand Est in northeastern France.

== See also ==
- Communes of the Moselle department
