= Ay-sur-Moselle =

- Commune
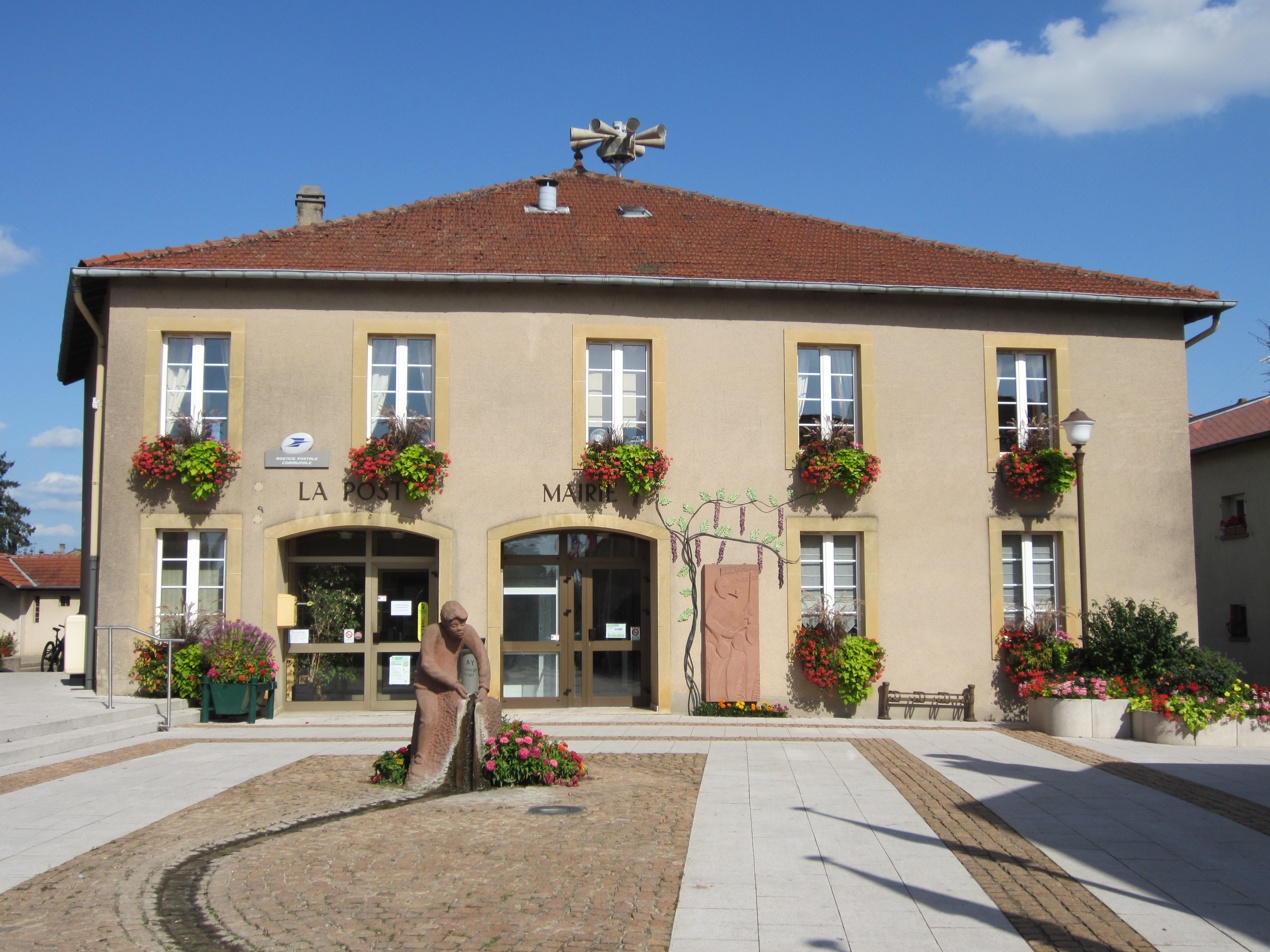
- The town hall in Ay-sur-Moselle

- Coat of arms
- Location of Ay-sur-Moselle
- Location within France Location within Grand Est
- Coordinates: 49°14′39″N 6°12′28″E
- Country: France
- Region: Grand Est
- Department: Moselle
- Arrondissement: Metz
- Canton: Le Pays Messin
- Intercommunality: CC Rives Moselle

Government
  - Mayor (2020–2026): Catherine Lapoirie
- Area^{1}: 4.69 km^{2} (1.81 sq mi)
- Elevation: 172 m (564 ft)
- Highest elevation: 182 m (597 ft)
- Lowest elevation: 154 m (505 ft)
- Population (2023): 1,601
  - Density: 341/km^{2} (884/sq mi)
- Time zone: UTC+01:00 (CET)
  - Summer (DST): UTC+02:00 (CEST)
- INSEE/Postal code: 57043 /57300
- ^{1} French Land Register data, which excludes lakes, ponds, glaciers > 1 km^{2} (0.386 sq mi or 247 acres) and river estuaries.

Ay-sur-Moselle (French pronunciation: [ɛ syʁ mɔzɛl], literally Ay on Moselle; German: Aich an der Mosel) is a commune in the Moselle department in Grand Est in northeastern France.

== Population ==
Historical population
Year	Pop.	±% p.a.
1968	1,114	—
1975	1,410	+3.42%
1982	1,252	−1.68%
1990	1,344	+0.89%
1999	1,525	+1.41%
2007	1,558	+0.27%
2012	1,506	−0.68%
2017	1,491	−0.20%
2023	1,601	+1.19%
Source: INSEE

== See also ==
- Communes of the Moselle department
