= Sanry-sur-Nied =

- Commune
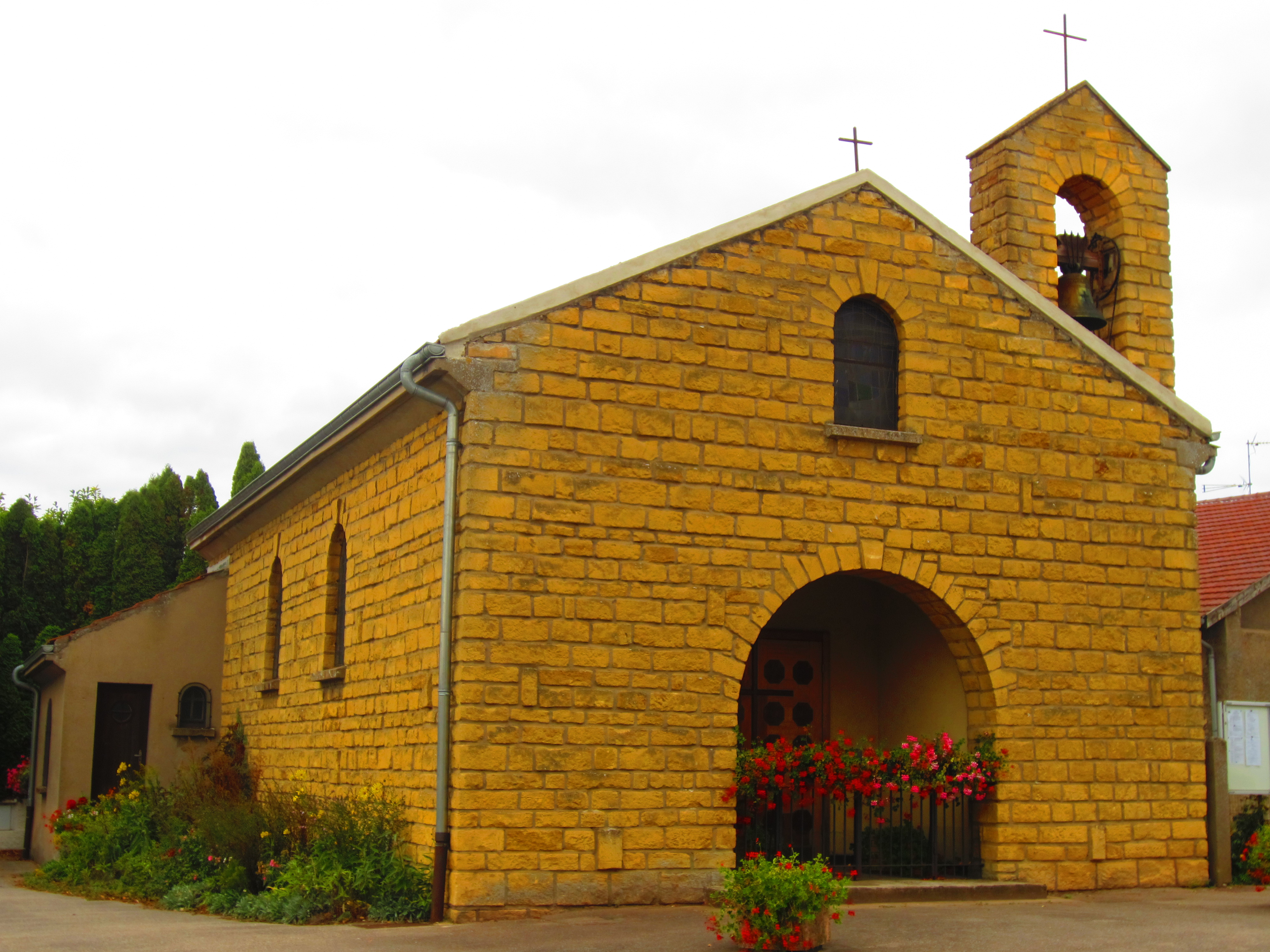
- The chapel in Sanry-sur-Nied

- Coat of arms
- Location of Sanry-sur-Nied
- Location within France Location within Grand Est
- Coordinates: 49°03′12″N 6°20′41″E
- Country: France
- Region: Grand Est
- Department: Moselle
- Arrondissement: Metz
- Canton: Le Pays Messin
- Intercommunality: Haut Chemin - Pays de Pange

Government
  - Mayor (2020–2026): Marie-Laure Poinsignon
- Area^{1}: 4.81 km^{2} (1.86 sq mi)
- Elevation: 220 m (720 ft)
- Highest elevation: 300 m (980 ft)
- Lowest elevation: 215 m (705 ft)
- Population (2023): 426
  - Density: 88.6/km^{2} (229/sq mi)
- Time zone: UTC+01:00 (CET)
  - Summer (DST): UTC+02:00 (CEST)
- INSEE/Postal code: 57627 /57530
- ^{1} French Land Register data, which excludes lakes, ponds, glaciers > 1 km^{2} (0.386 sq mi or 247 acres) and river estuaries.

Sanry-sur-Nied (French pronunciation: [sɑ̃ʁi syʁ nje], literally Sanry on Nied; German: Sanringen an der Nied) is a commune in the Moselle department in Grand Est in north-eastern France.

== See also ==
- Communes of the Moselle department
