= Mey, Moselle =

Mey
- Commune
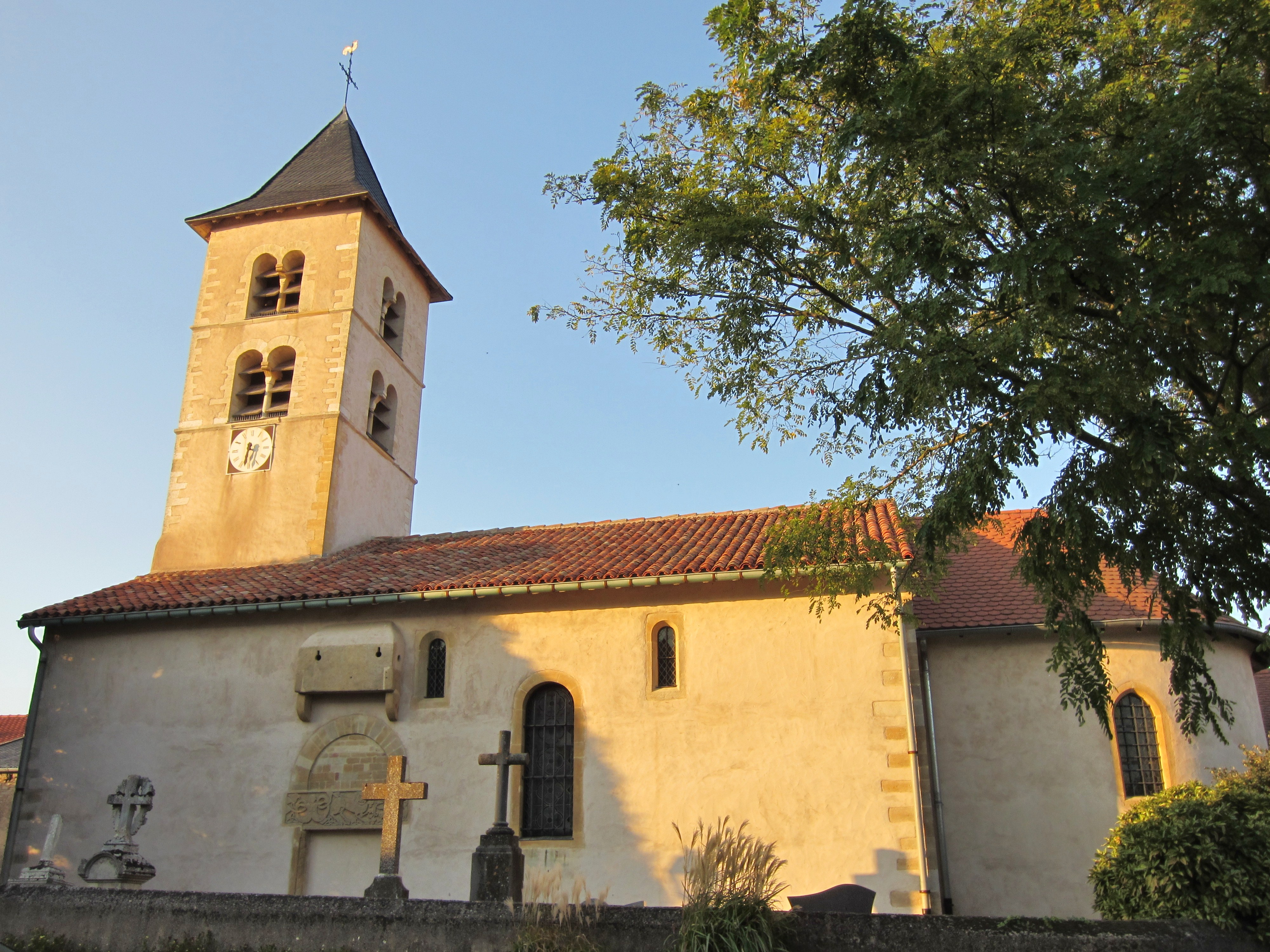
- The church in Mey

- Coat of arms
- Location of Mey
- Location within France Location within Grand Est
- Coordinates: 49°08′14″N 6°14′12″E
- Country: France
- Region: Grand Est
- Department: Moselle
- Arrondissement: Metz
- Canton: Le Pays Messin
- Intercommunality: Metz Métropole

Government
  - Mayor (2020–2026): Sylvie Roux
- Area^{1}: 1.91 km^{2} (0.74 sq mi)
- Elevation: 225 m (738 ft)
- Highest elevation: 250 m (820 ft)
- Lowest elevation: 179 m (587 ft)
- Population (2023): 309
  - Density: 162/km^{2} (419/sq mi)
- Time zone: UTC+01:00 (CET)
  - Summer (DST): UTC+02:00 (CEST)
- INSEE/Postal code: 57467 /57070
- ^{1} French Land Register data, which excludes lakes, ponds, glaciers > 1 km^{2} (0.386 sq mi or 247 acres) and river estuaries.

Mey (French pronunciation: [mɛ]; German: Maien) is a commune in the Moselle department in Grand Est in north-eastern France.

== See also ==
- Communes of the Moselle department
