= Failly =

- Commune
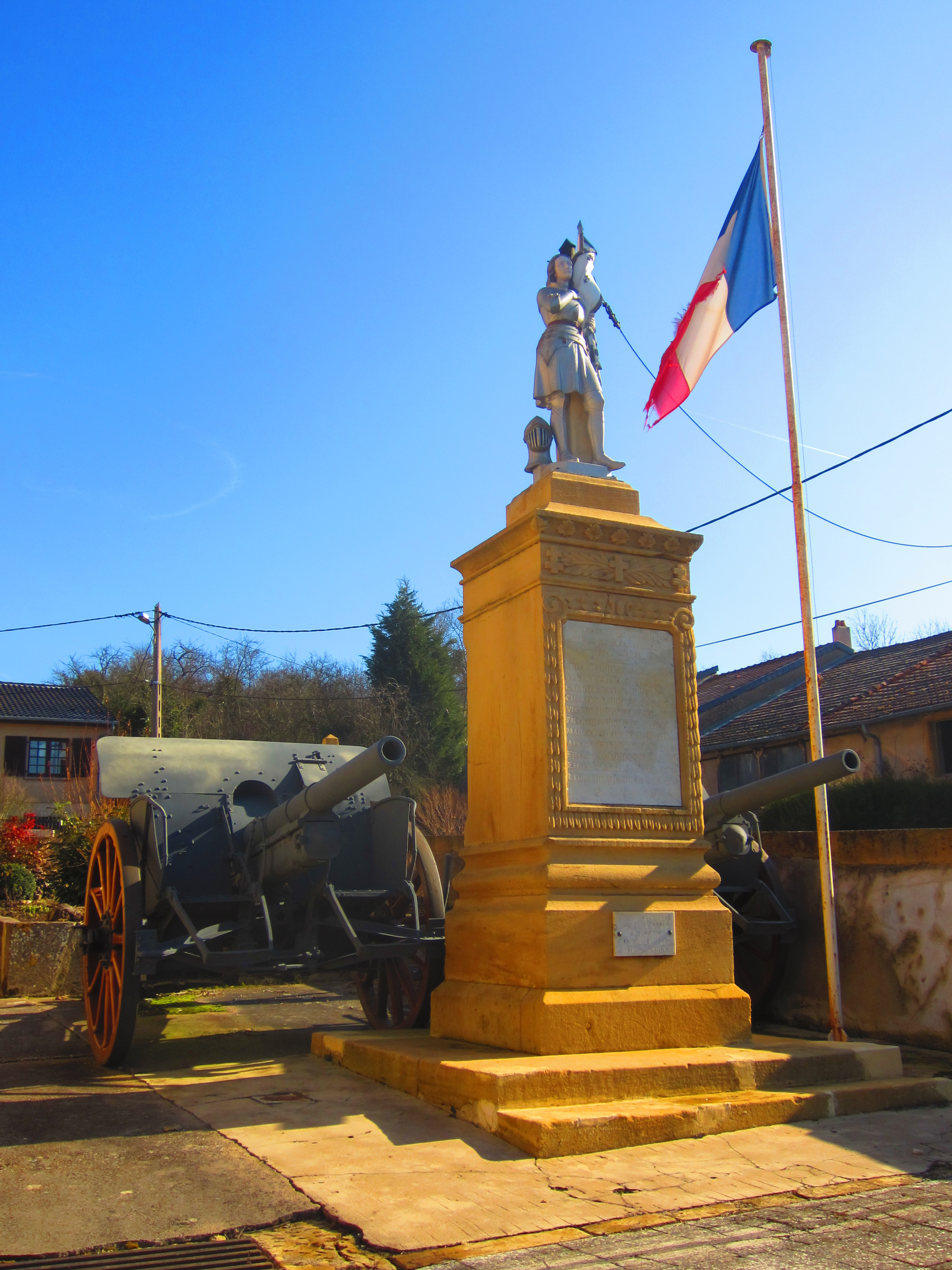
- The war memorial in Failly

- Coat of arms
- Location of Failly
- Location within France Location within Grand Est
- Coordinates: 49°09′29″N 6°15′50″E
- Country: France
- Region: Grand Est
- Department: Moselle
- Arrondissement: Metz
- Canton: Le Pays Messin
- Intercommunality: Haut Chemin-Pays de Pange

Government
  - Mayor (2020–2026): Alain Dalstein
- Area^{1}: 6.74 km^{2} (2.60 sq mi)
- Highest elevation: 304 m (997 ft)
- Lowest elevation: 187 m (614 ft)
- Population (2023): 532
  - Density: 78.9/km^{2} (204/sq mi)
- Time zone: UTC+01:00 (CET)
  - Summer (DST): UTC+02:00 (CEST)
- INSEE/Postal code: 57204 /57640
- ^{1} French Land Register data, which excludes lakes, ponds, glaciers > 1 km^{2} (0.386 sq mi or 247 acres) and river estuaries.

Failly (French pronunciation: [faji]; German: Fremich) is a commune in the Moselle department in Grand Est in north-eastern France.

== Population ==
Historical population
Year	Pop.	±% p.a.
1968	233	—
1975	321	+4.68%
1982	490	+6.23%
1990	546	+1.36%
1999	522	−0.50%
2007	565	+0.99%
2012	547	−0.65%
2017	511	−1.35%
2023	532	+0.67%
Source: INSEE

== See also ==
- Communes of the Moselle department
