= Malroy =

- Commune
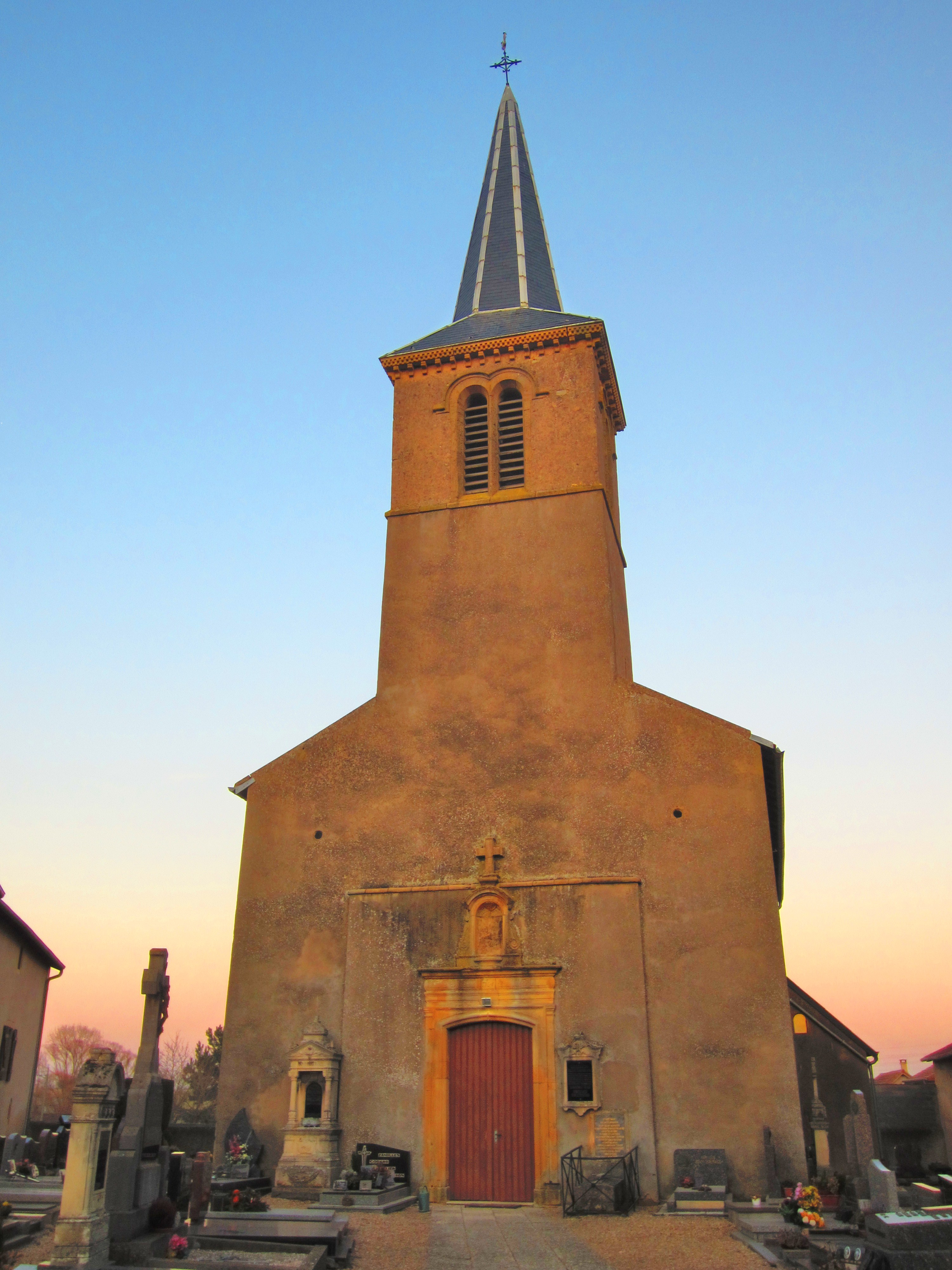
- The church in Malroy

- Coat of arms
- Location of Malroy
- Location within France Location within Grand Est
- Coordinates: 49°10′37″N 6°12′47″E
- Country: France
- Region: Grand Est
- Department: Moselle
- Arrondissement: Metz
- Canton: Le Pays Messin
- Intercommunality: CC Rives de Moselle

Government
  - Mayor (2020–2026): Hervé Gaudé
- Area^{1}: 3.54 km^{2} (1.37 sq mi)
- Elevation: 200 m (660 ft)
- Highest elevation: 205 m (673 ft)
- Lowest elevation: 160 m (520 ft)
- Population (2023): 353
  - Density: 99.7/km^{2} (258/sq mi)
- Time zone: UTC+01:00 (CET)
  - Summer (DST): UTC+02:00 (CEST)
- INSEE/Postal code: 57438 /57640
- ^{1} French Land Register data, which excludes lakes, ponds, glaciers > 1 km^{2} (0.386 sq mi or 247 acres) and river estuaries.

Malroy (French pronunciation: [malʁwa]; German: Malrich) is a commune in the Moselle department in Grand Est in north-eastern France.

== Gallery ==
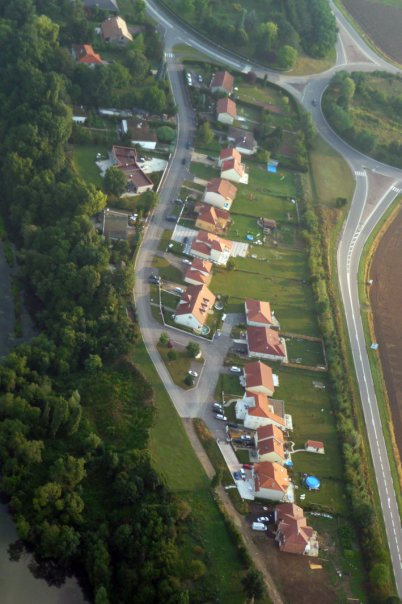
Chemin de la Croisette

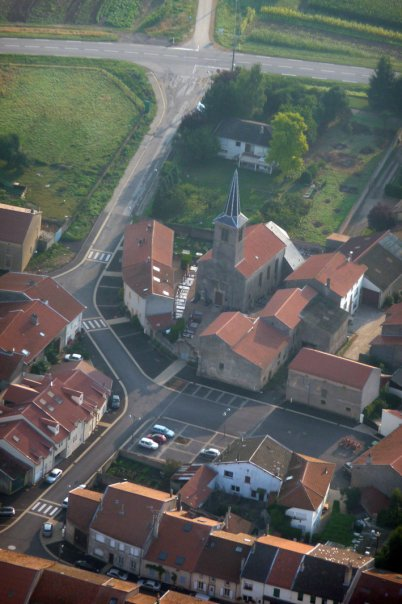
Church

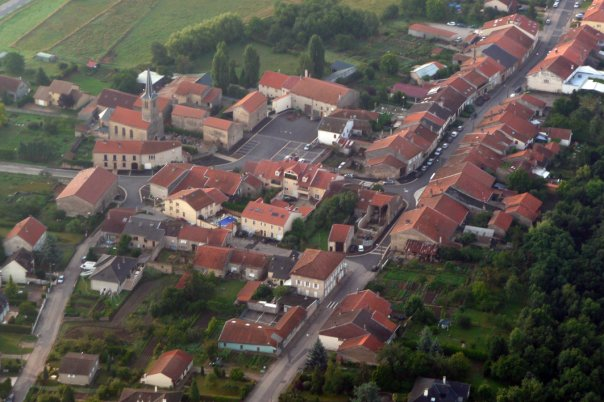
Aerial view

== See also ==
- Communes of the Moselle department
