= Flévy =

- Commune
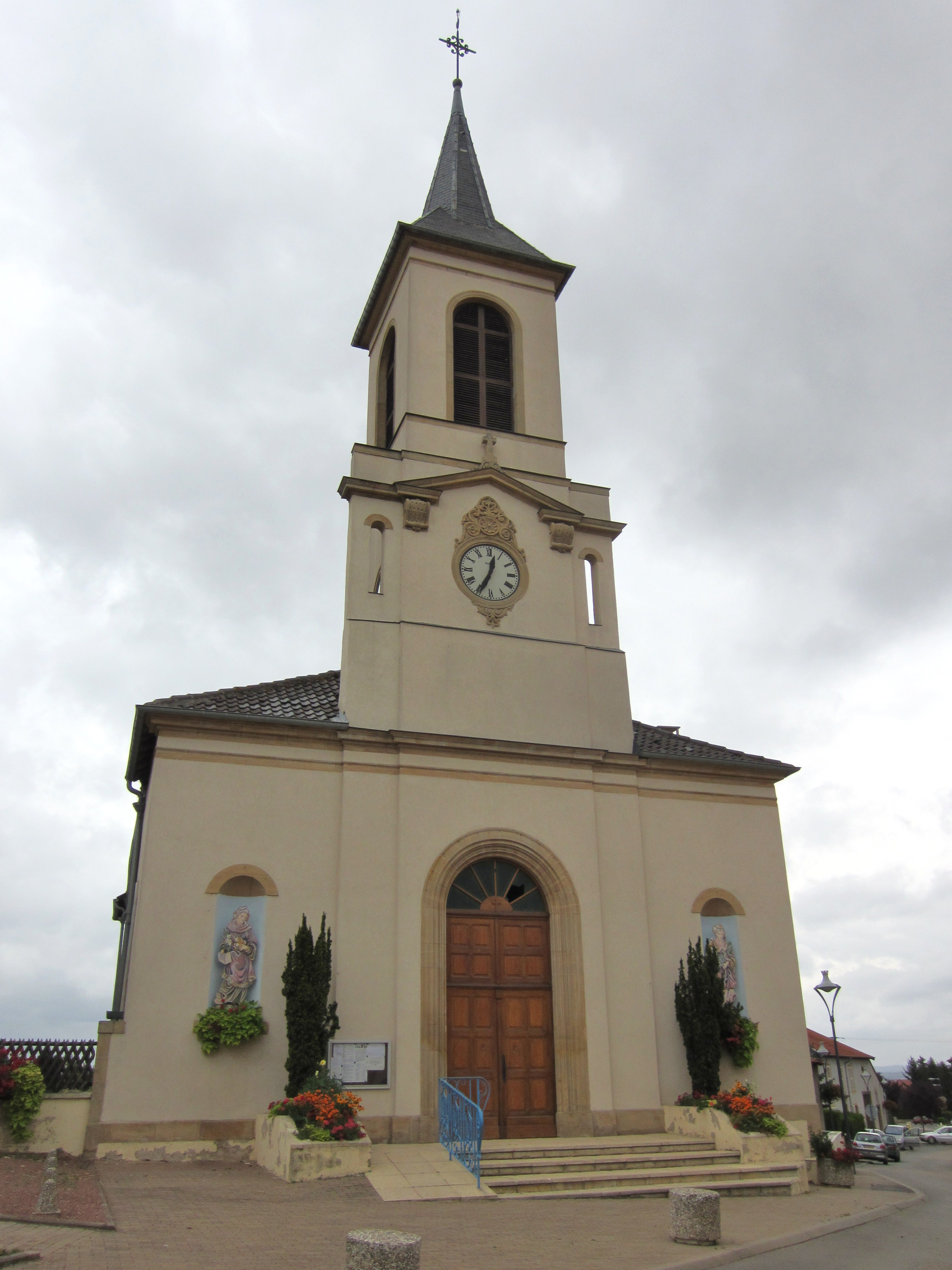
- The church in Flévy

- Coat of arms
- Location of Flévy
- Location within France Location within Grand Est
- Coordinates: 49°14′15″N 6°14′45″E
- Country: France
- Region: Grand Est
- Department: Moselle
- Arrondissement: Metz
- Canton: Le Pays Messin
- Intercommunality: CC Rives de Moselle

Government
  - Mayor (2022–2026): Daniel Mauer
- Area^{1}: 11.58 km^{2} (4.47 sq mi)
- Elevation: 209 m (686 ft)
- Highest elevation: 259 m (850 ft)
- Lowest elevation: 172 m (564 ft)
- Population (2023): 602
  - Density: 52.0/km^{2} (135/sq mi)
- Time zone: UTC+01:00 (CET)
  - Summer (DST): UTC+02:00 (CEST)
- INSEE/Postal code: 57219 /57365
- ^{1} French Land Register data, which excludes lakes, ponds, glaciers > 1 km^{2} (0.386 sq mi or 247 acres) and river estuaries.

Flévy (French pronunciation: [flevi]; German: Flaich) is a commune in the Moselle department in Grand Est in north-eastern France.

== See also ==
- Communes of the Moselle department
