= Servigny-lès-Sainte-Barbe =

- Commune
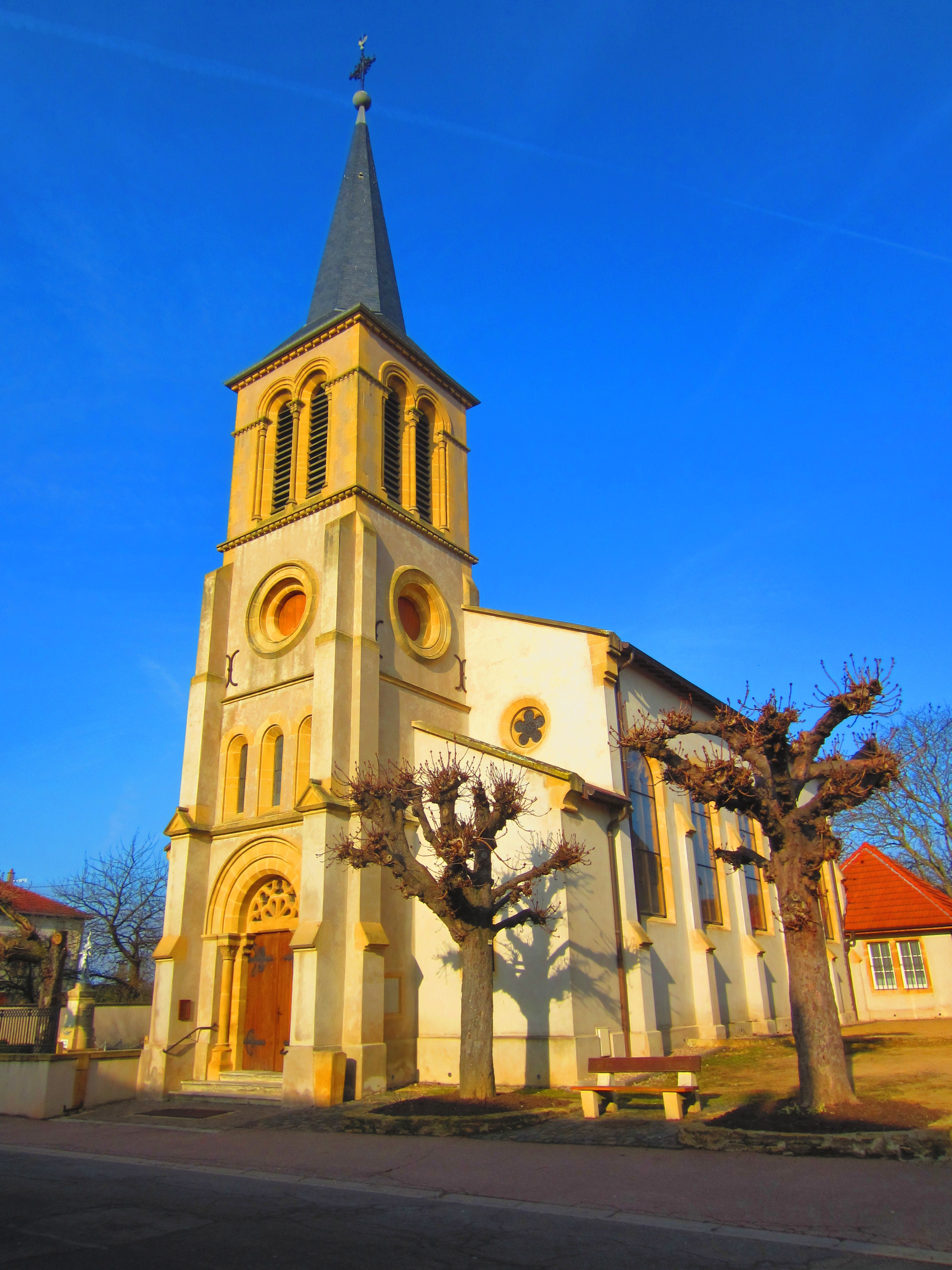
- The church in Servigny-lès-Sainte-Barbe

- Coat of arms
- Location of Servigny-lès-Sainte-Barbe
- Location within France Location within Grand Est
- Coordinates: 49°09′00″N 6°16′37″E
- Country: France
- Region: Grand Est
- Department: Moselle
- Arrondissement: Metz
- Canton: Le Pays Messin
- Intercommunality: Haut Chemin - Pays de Pange

Government
  - Mayor (2020–2026): Joël Simon
- Area^{1}: 3.09 km^{2} (1.19 sq mi)
- Elevation: 265 m (869 ft)
- Highest elevation: 281 m (922 ft)
- Lowest elevation: 205 m (673 ft)
- Population (2023): 462
  - Density: 150/km^{2} (387/sq mi)
- Time zone: UTC+01:00 (CET)
  - Summer (DST): UTC+02:00 (CEST)
- INSEE/Postal code: 57649 /57640
- ^{1} French Land Register data, which excludes lakes, ponds, glaciers > 1 km^{2} (0.386 sq mi or 247 acres) and river estuaries.

Servigny-lès-Sainte-Barbe (French pronunciation: [sɛʁviɲi lɛ sɛ̃t baʁb], literally Servigny near Sainte-Barbe; German: Servingen) is a commune in the Moselle department in Grand Est in north-eastern France.

== See also ==
- Communes of the Moselle department
