= Vany, Moselle =

Vany
- Commune
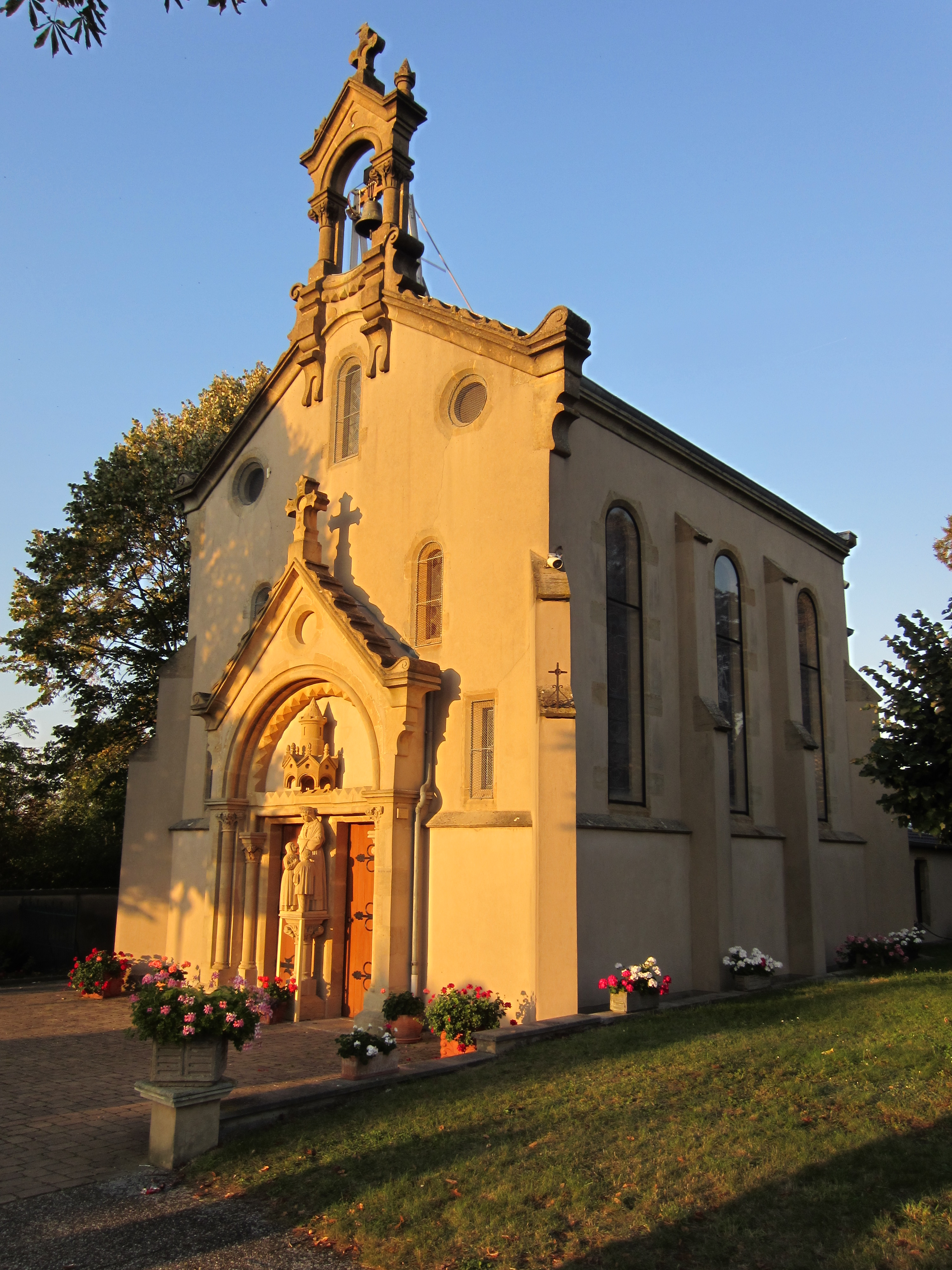
- The chapel in Villers l'Orme

- Coat of arms
- Location of Vany
- Location within France Location within Grand Est
- Coordinates: 49°09′27″N 6°14′33″E
- Country: France
- Region: Grand Est
- Department: Moselle
- Arrondissement: Metz
- Canton: Le Pays Messin
- Intercommunality: Metz Métropole

Government
  - Mayor (2020–2026): Vincent Dieudonne
- Area^{1}: 3.1 km^{2} (1.2 sq mi)
- Elevation: 180 m (590 ft)
- Highest elevation: 258 m (846 ft)
- Lowest elevation: 182 m (597 ft)
- Population (2023): 478
  - Density: 150/km^{2} (400/sq mi)
- Time zone: UTC+01:00 (CET)
  - Summer (DST): UTC+02:00 (CEST)
- INSEE/Postal code: 57694 /57070
- ^{1} French Land Register data, which excludes lakes, ponds, glaciers > 1 km^{2} (0.386 sq mi or 247 acres) and river estuaries.

Vany (French pronunciation: [vani]; German: Warningen) is a commune in the Moselle department in Grand Est in north-eastern France.

== See also ==
- Communes of the Moselle department
