= Pange =

- Commune
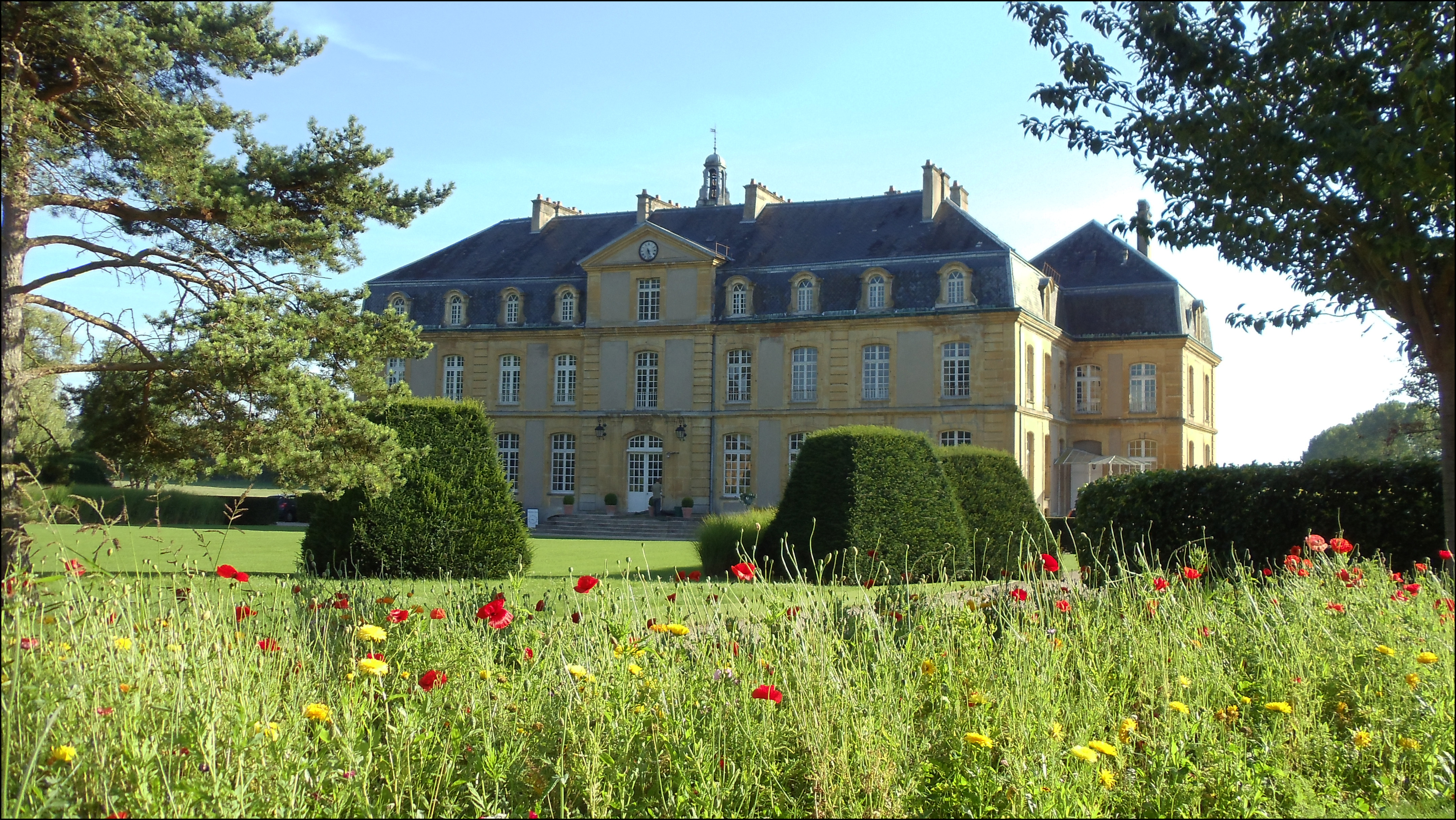
- The chateau in Pange

- Coat of arms
- Location of Pange
- Location within France Location within Grand Est
- Coordinates: 49°05′08″N 6°21′28″E
- Country: France
- Region: Grand Est
- Department: Moselle
- Arrondissement: Metz
- Canton: Le Pays Messin
- Intercommunality: Haut Chemin - Pays de Pange

Government
  - Mayor (2020–2026): Roland Chloup
- Area^{1}: 8.57 km^{2} (3.31 sq mi)
- Elevation: 300 m (980 ft)
- Highest elevation: 289 m (948 ft)
- Lowest elevation: 212 m (696 ft)
- Population (2023): 869
  - Density: 101/km^{2} (263/sq mi)
- Time zone: UTC+01:00 (CET)
  - Summer (DST): UTC+02:00 (CEST)
- INSEE/Postal code: 57533 /57530
- ^{1} French Land Register data, which excludes lakes, ponds, glaciers > 1 km^{2} (0.386 sq mi or 247 acres) and river estuaries.

Pange (French pronunciation: [pɑ̃ʒ]; German: Spangen an der Nied) is a commune in the Moselle department in Grand Est in north-eastern France.

== See also ==
- Communes of the Moselle department
