= Vry =

- Commune
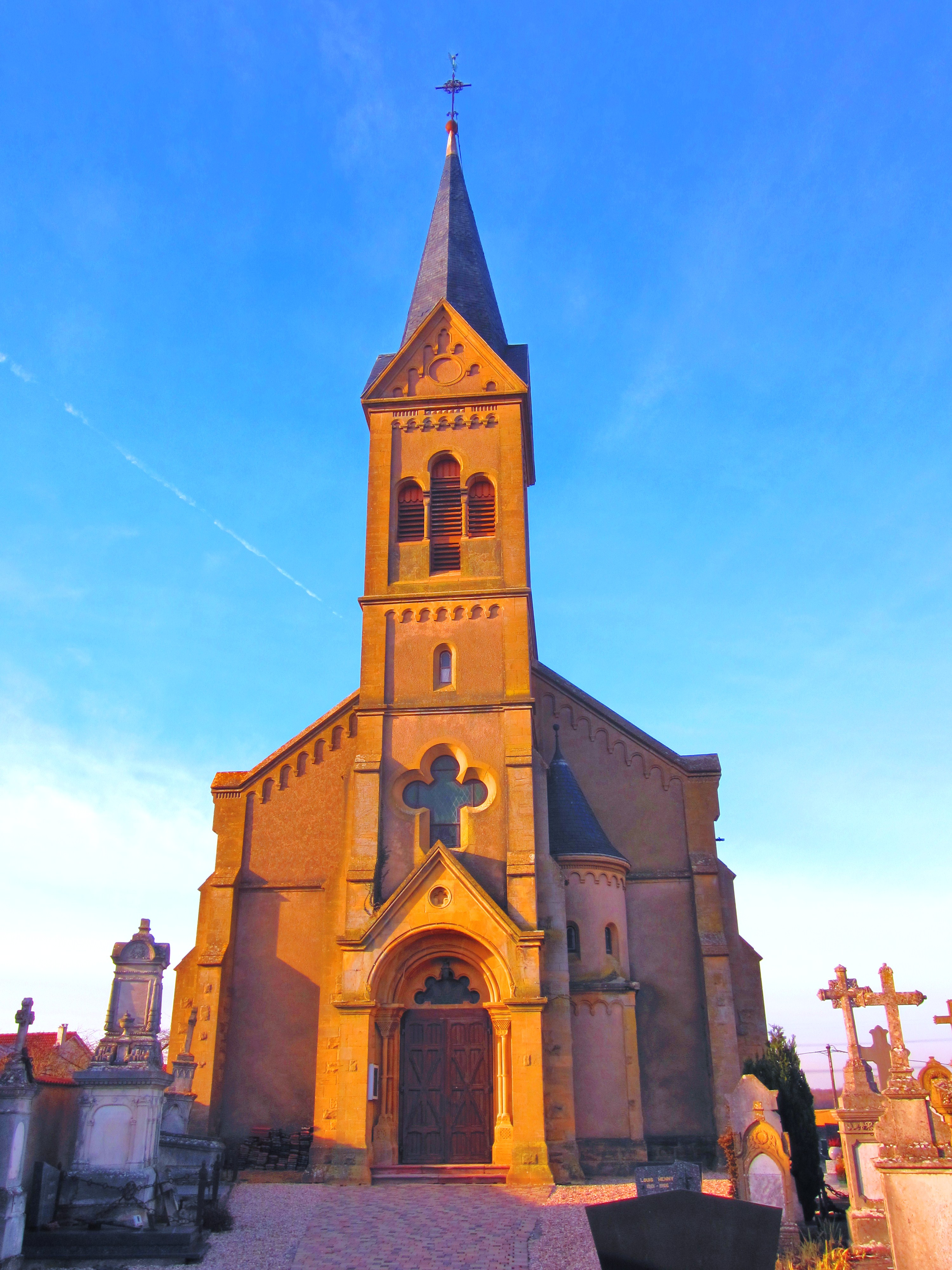
- The church in Vry

- Coat of arms
- Location of Vry
- Location within France Location within Grand Est
- Coordinates: 49°11′26″N 6°19′50″E
- Country: France
- Region: Grand Est
- Department: Moselle
- Arrondissement: Metz
- Canton: Le Pays Messin
- Intercommunality: Haut Chemin-Pays de Pange

Government
  - Mayor (2020–2026): Dominique Mast
- Area^{1}: 15.08 km^{2} (5.82 sq mi)
- Elevation: 290 m (950 ft)
- Highest elevation: 349 m (1,145 ft)
- Lowest elevation: 228 m (748 ft)
- Population (2023): 631
  - Density: 41.8/km^{2} (108/sq mi)
- Time zone: UTC+01:00 (CET)
  - Summer (DST): UTC+02:00 (CEST)
- INSEE/Postal code: 57736 /57640
- ^{1} French Land Register data, which excludes lakes, ponds, glaciers > 1 km^{2} (0.386 sq mi or 247 acres) and river estuaries.

Vry (French pronunciation: [vʁi]; German: Verich) is a commune in the Moselle department in Grand Est in north-eastern France.

== Population ==
Historical population
Year	Pop.	±% p.a.
1968	182	—
1975	184	+0.16%
1982	253	+4.65%
1990	359	+4.47%
1999	439	+2.26%
2007	517	+2.07%
2012	547	+1.13%
2017	595	+1.70%
2023	631	+0.98%
Source: INSEE

== See also ==
- Communes of the Moselle department
