= Peltre =

- Commune
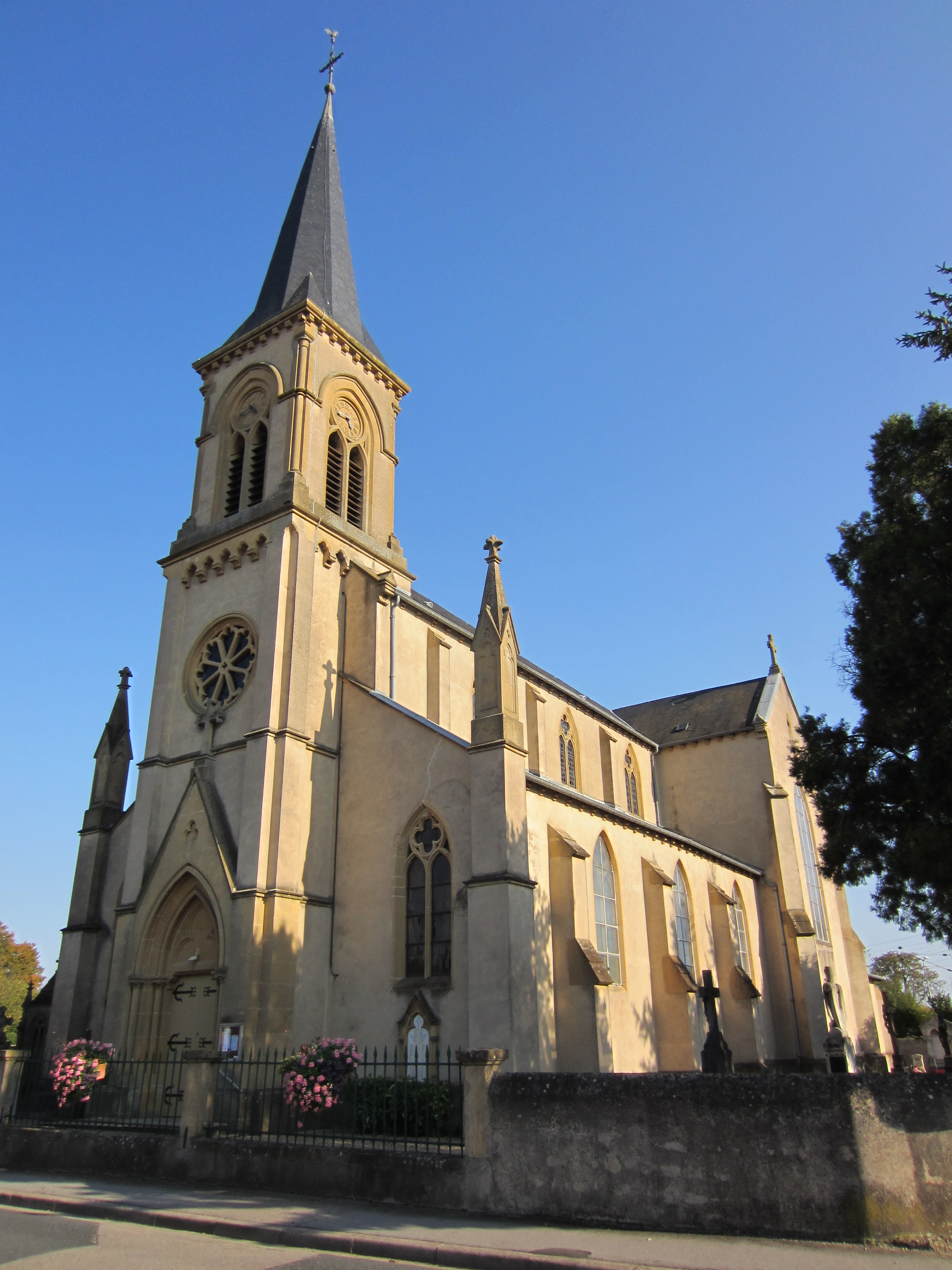
- The church in Peltre

- Coat of arms
- Location of Peltre
- Location within France Location within Grand Est
- Coordinates: 49°04′33″N 6°13′29″E
- Country: France
- Region: Grand Est
- Department: Moselle
- Arrondissement: Metz
- Canton: Le Pays Messin
- Intercommunality: Metz Métropole

Government
  - Mayor (2020–2026): Walter Kurtzmann
- Area^{1}: 8.37 km^{2} (3.23 sq mi)
- Elevation: 190 m (620 ft)
- Highest elevation: 246 m (807 ft)
- Lowest elevation: 179 m (587 ft)
- Population (2023): 1,790
  - Density: 214/km^{2} (554/sq mi)
- Demonym: Peltrois
- Time zone: UTC+01:00 (CET)
  - Summer (DST): UTC+02:00 (CEST)
- INSEE/Postal code: 57534 /57245
- ^{1} French Land Register data, which excludes lakes, ponds, glaciers > 1 km^{2} (0.386 sq mi or 247 acres) and river estuaries.

Peltre (French pronunciation: [pɛltʁ]; German: Pelter) is a commune in the Moselle department in Grand Est in north-eastern France.

== See also ==
- Communes of the Moselle department
