= Chieulles =

- Commune
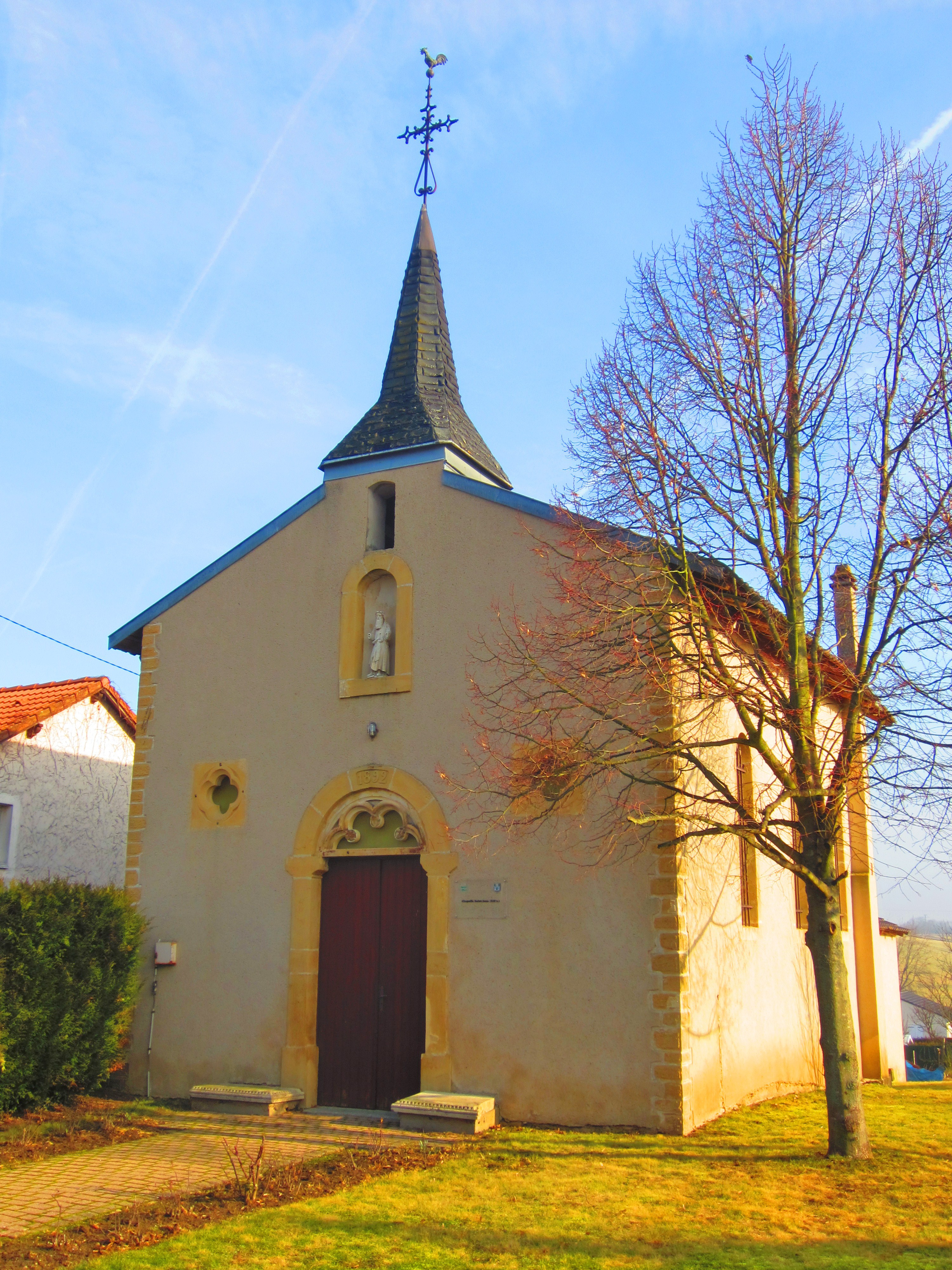
- The chapel in Chieulles

- Coat of arms
- Location of Chieulles
- Location within France Location within Grand Est
- Coordinates: 49°09′33″N 6°13′49″E
- Country: France
- Region: Grand Est
- Department: Moselle
- Arrondissement: Metz
- Canton: Le Pays Messin
- Intercommunality: Metz Métropole

Government
  - Mayor (2020–2026): Jean-Louis Ballarini
- Area^{1}: 2.61 km^{2} (1.01 sq mi)
- Elevation: 190 m (620 ft)
- Highest elevation: 223 m (732 ft)
- Lowest elevation: 162 m (531 ft)
- Population (2023): 408
  - Density: 156/km^{2} (405/sq mi)
- Time zone: UTC+01:00 (CET)
  - Summer (DST): UTC+02:00 (CEST)
- INSEE/Postal code: 57142 /57070
- ^{1} French Land Register data, which excludes lakes, ponds, glaciers > 1 km^{2} (0.386 sq mi or 247 acres) and river estuaries.

Chieulles (French pronunciation: [ʃjœl]; German: Schöllen) is a commune in the Moselle department in Grand Est in north-eastern France.

The town is bordered by the Moselle.

== See also ==
- Communes of the Moselle department
