= Chesny =

- Commune
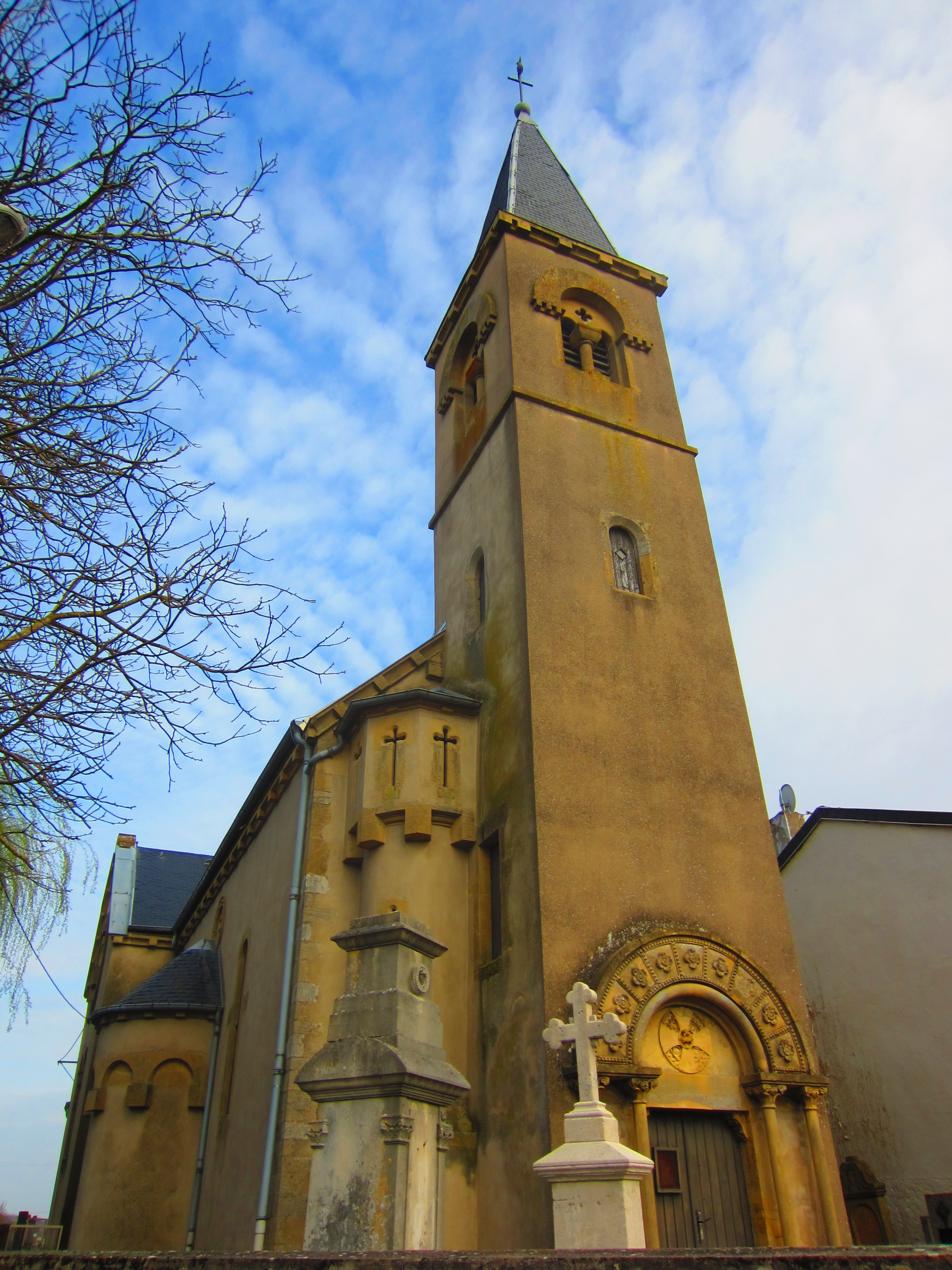
- The church in Chesny

- Coat of arms
- Location of Chesny
- Location within France Location within Grand Est
- Coordinates: 49°03′19″N 6°14′34″E
- Country: France
- Region: Grand Est
- Department: Moselle
- Arrondissement: Metz
- Canton: Le Pays Messin
- Intercommunality: Metz Métropole

Government
  - Mayor (2020–2026): Pascal Huber
- Area^{1}: 4.34 km^{2} (1.68 sq mi)
- Elevation: 120 m (390 ft)
- Highest elevation: 233 m (764 ft)
- Lowest elevation: 190 m (620 ft)
- Population (2023): 553
  - Density: 127/km^{2} (330/sq mi)
- Time zone: UTC+01:00 (CET)
  - Summer (DST): UTC+02:00 (CEST)
- INSEE/Postal code: 57140 /57245
- ^{1} French Land Register data, which excludes lakes, ponds, glaciers > 1 km^{2} (0.386 sq mi or 247 acres) and river estuaries.

Chesny (French pronunciation: [ʃɛni]; German: Kessenach) is a commune in the Moselle department in Grand Est in north-eastern France.

== See also ==
- Communes of the Moselle department
