= Antilly, Moselle =

Antilly
- Commune
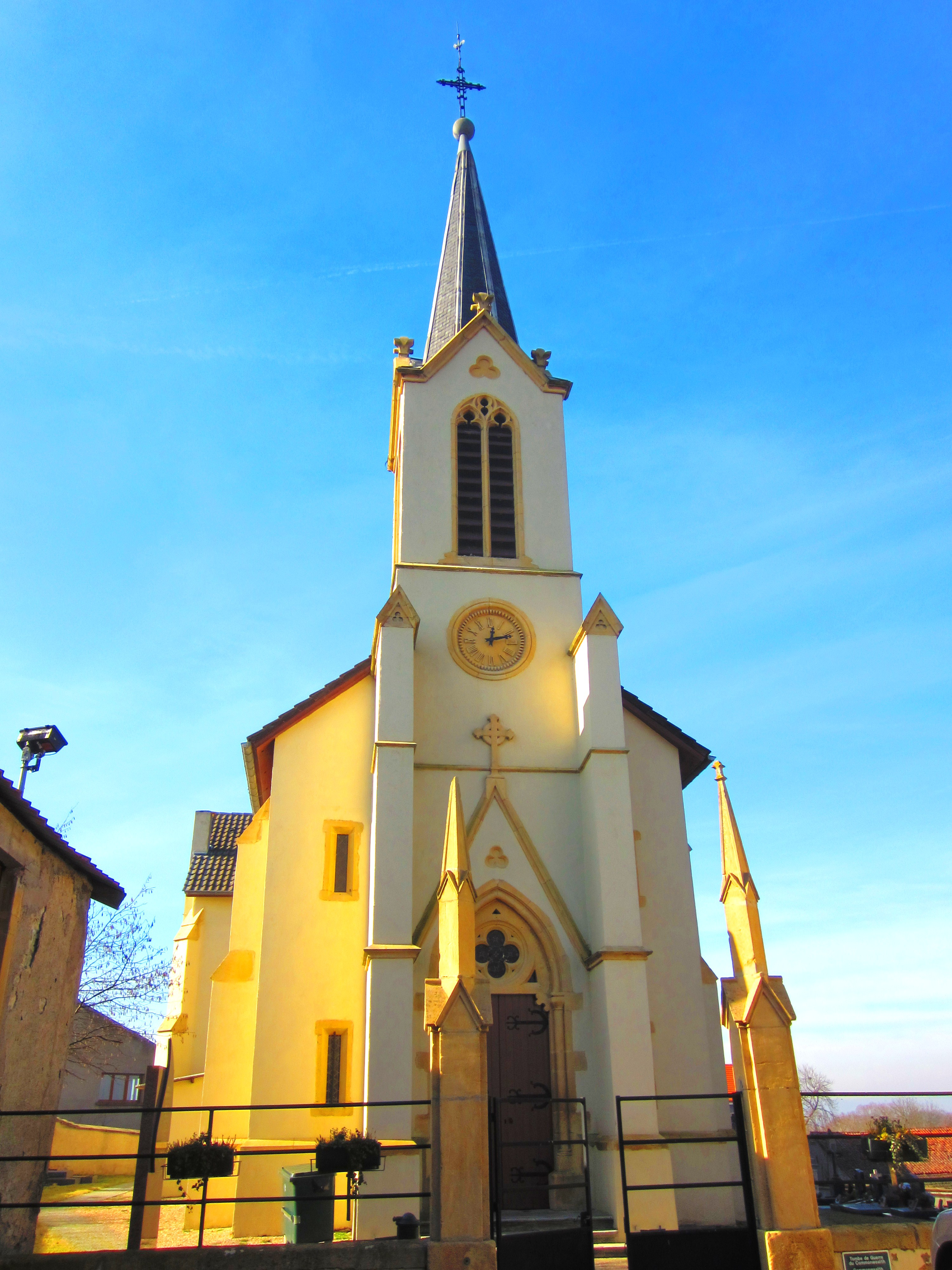
- The church in Antilly

- Coat of arms
- Location of Antilly
- Location within France Location within Grand Est
- Coordinates: 49°11′45″N 6°15′06″E
- Country: France
- Region: Grand Est
- Department: Moselle
- Arrondissement: Metz
- Canton: Le Pays Messin

Government
  - Mayor (2020–2026): Arnaud Demuynck
- Area^{1}: 4.74 km^{2} (1.83 sq mi)
- Elevation: 250 m (820 ft)
- Highest elevation: 224 m (735 ft)
- Lowest elevation: 170 m (560 ft)
- Population (2023): 198
  - Density: 41.8/km^{2} (108/sq mi)
- Time zone: UTC+01:00 (CET)
  - Summer (DST): UTC+02:00 (CEST)
- INSEE/Postal code: 57024 /57640
- ^{1} French Land Register data, which excludes lakes, ponds, glaciers > 1 km^{2} (0.386 sq mi or 247 acres) and river estuaries.

Antilly (German: Antullen) is a commune in the Moselle department in Grand Est in northeastern France.

== Population ==
Historical population
Year	Pop.	±% p.a.
1968	95	—
1975	117	+3.02%
1982	111	−0.75%
1990	94	−2.06%
1999	107	+1.45%
2007	116	+1.01%
2012	133	+2.77%
2017	172	+5.28%
2023	198	+2.37%
Source: INSEE

== See also ==
- Communes of the Moselle department
