= Burtoncourt =

- Commune
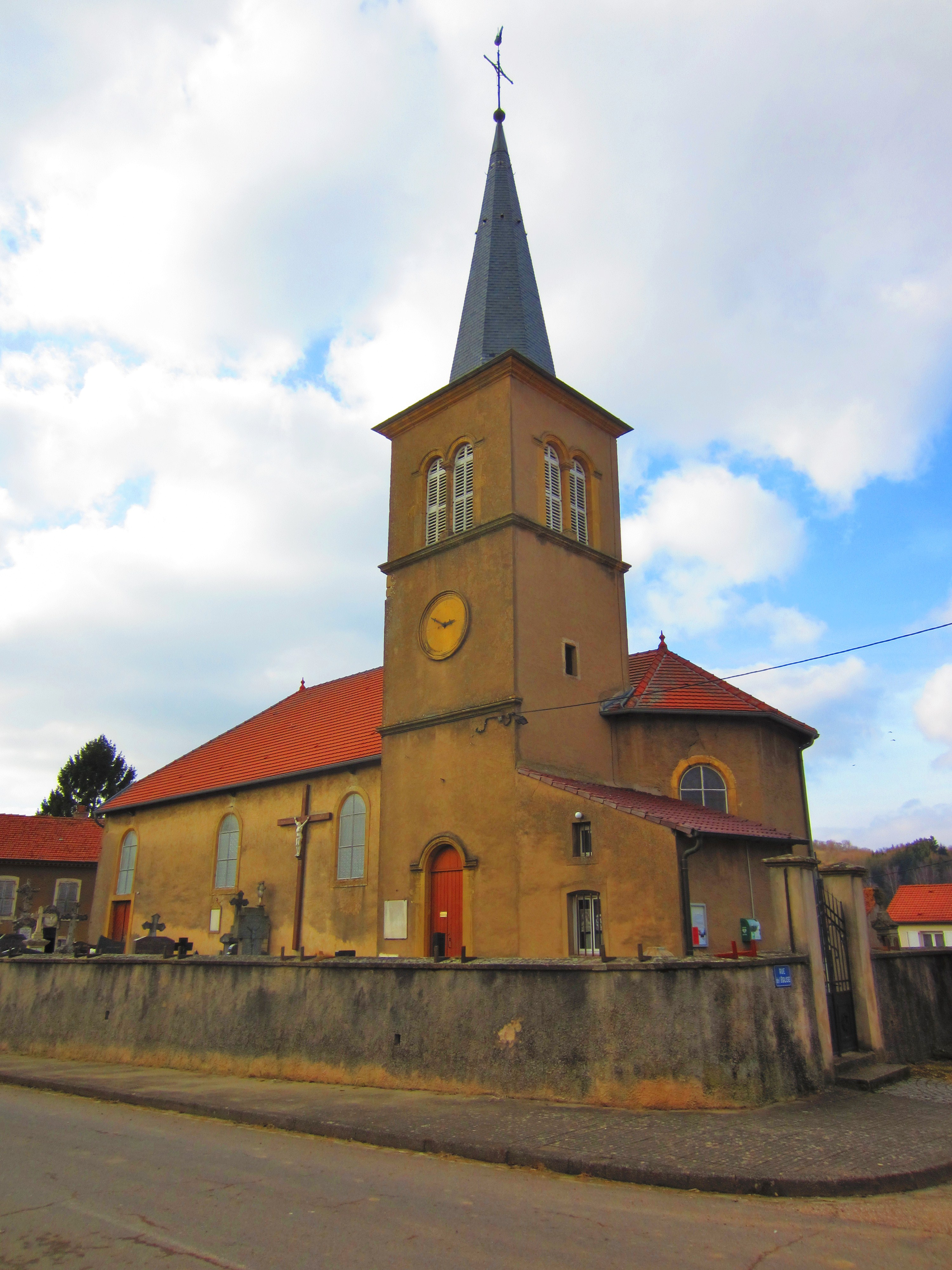
- The church in Burtoncourt

- Coat of arms
- Location of Burtoncourt
- Location within France Location within Grand Est
- Coordinates: 49°13′31″N 6°24′47″E
- Country: France
- Region: Grand Est
- Department: Moselle
- Arrondissement: Metz
- Canton: Le Pays Messin
- Intercommunality: Haut Chemin - Pays de Pange

Government
  - Mayor (2020–2026): André Houpert
- Area^{1}: 5.11 km^{2} (1.97 sq mi)
- Elevation: 300 m (980 ft)
- Highest elevation: 343 m (1,125 ft)
- Lowest elevation: 219 m (719 ft)
- Population (2023): 228
  - Density: 44.6/km^{2} (116/sq mi)
- Time zone: UTC+01:00 (CET)
  - Summer (DST): UTC+02:00 (CEST)
- INSEE/Postal code: 57121 /57220
- ^{1} French Land Register data, which excludes lakes, ponds, glaciers > 1 km^{2} (0.386 sq mi or 247 acres) and river estuaries.

Burtoncourt (French pronunciation: [byʁtɔ̃kuʁ]; Lorrain: Beurtonco; Lorraine Franconian: Brittenduerf/Britendrëf; German: Brittendorf) is a commune in the Moselle department in Grand Est in northeastern France.

== Population ==
Historical population
Year	Pop.	±% p.a.
1968	132	—
1975	106	−3.09%
1982	131	+3.07%
1990	161	+2.61%
1999	173	+0.80%
2007	187	+0.98%
2012	220	+3.30%
2017	196	−2.28%
2023	228	+2.55%
Source: INSEE

== See also ==
- Communes of the Moselle department
