= Mécleuves =

- Commune
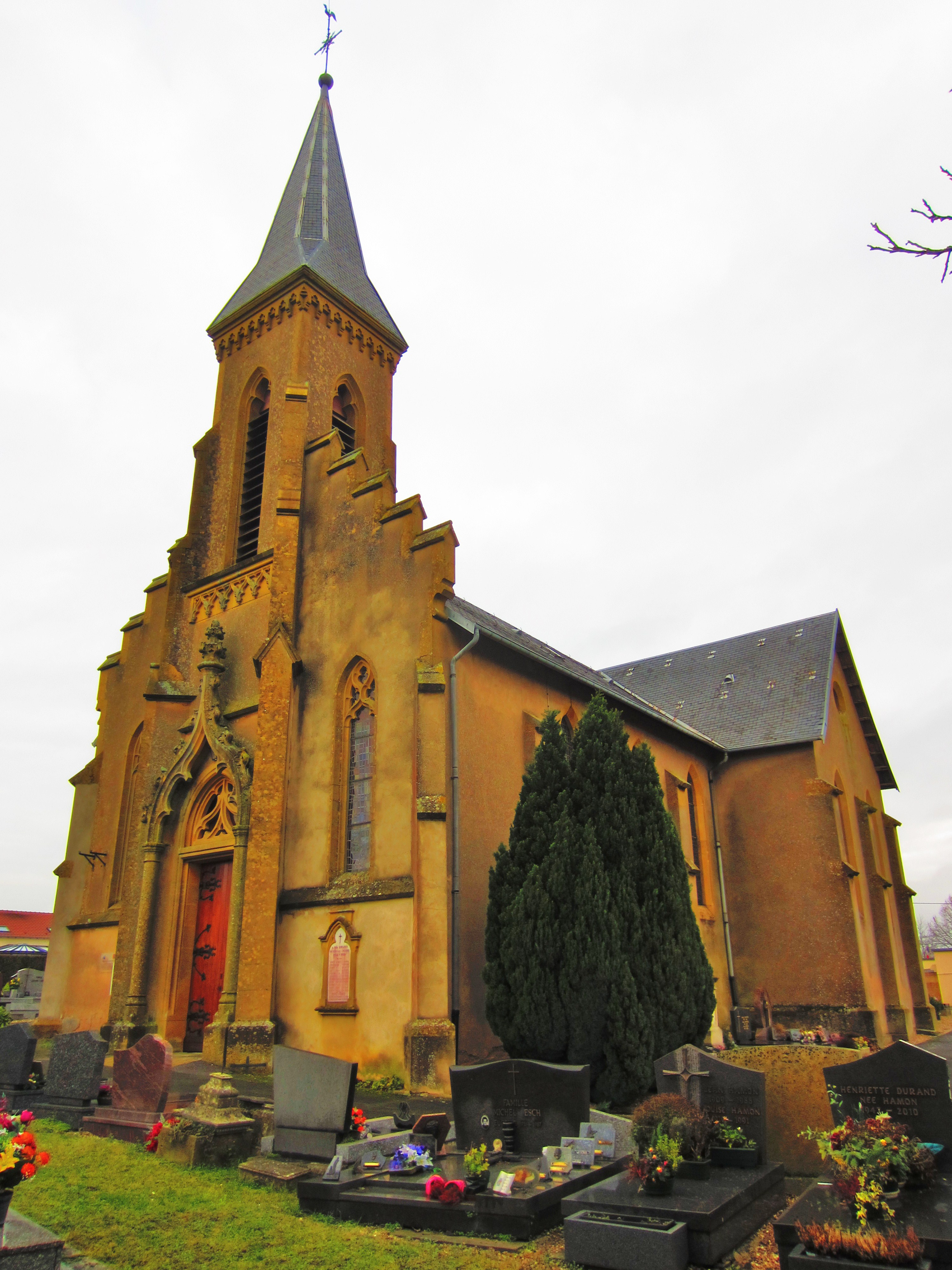
- The church in Mécleuves

- Coat of arms
- Location of Mécleuves
- Location within France Location within Grand Est
- Coordinates: 49°02′36″N 6°16′15″E
- Country: France
- Region: Grand Est
- Department: Moselle
- Arrondissement: Metz
- Canton: Le Pays Messin
- Intercommunality: Metz Métropole

Government
  - Mayor (2020–2026): Philippe Manzano
- Area^{1}: 12.88 km^{2} (4.97 sq mi)
- Elevation: 240 m (790 ft)
- Highest elevation: 292 m (958 ft)
- Lowest elevation: 192 m (630 ft)
- Population (2023): 1,196
  - Density: 92.86/km^{2} (240.5/sq mi)
- Time zone: UTC+01:00 (CET)
  - Summer (DST): UTC+02:00 (CEST)
- INSEE/Postal code: 57454 /57245
- ^{1} French Land Register data, which excludes lakes, ponds, glaciers > 1 km^{2} (0.386 sq mi or 247 acres) and river estuaries.

Mécleuves (French pronunciation: [meklœv]; German: Mekleven) is a commune in the Moselle department in Grand Est in north-eastern France.

== See also ==
- Communes of the Moselle department
