= Charly-Oradour =

- Commune
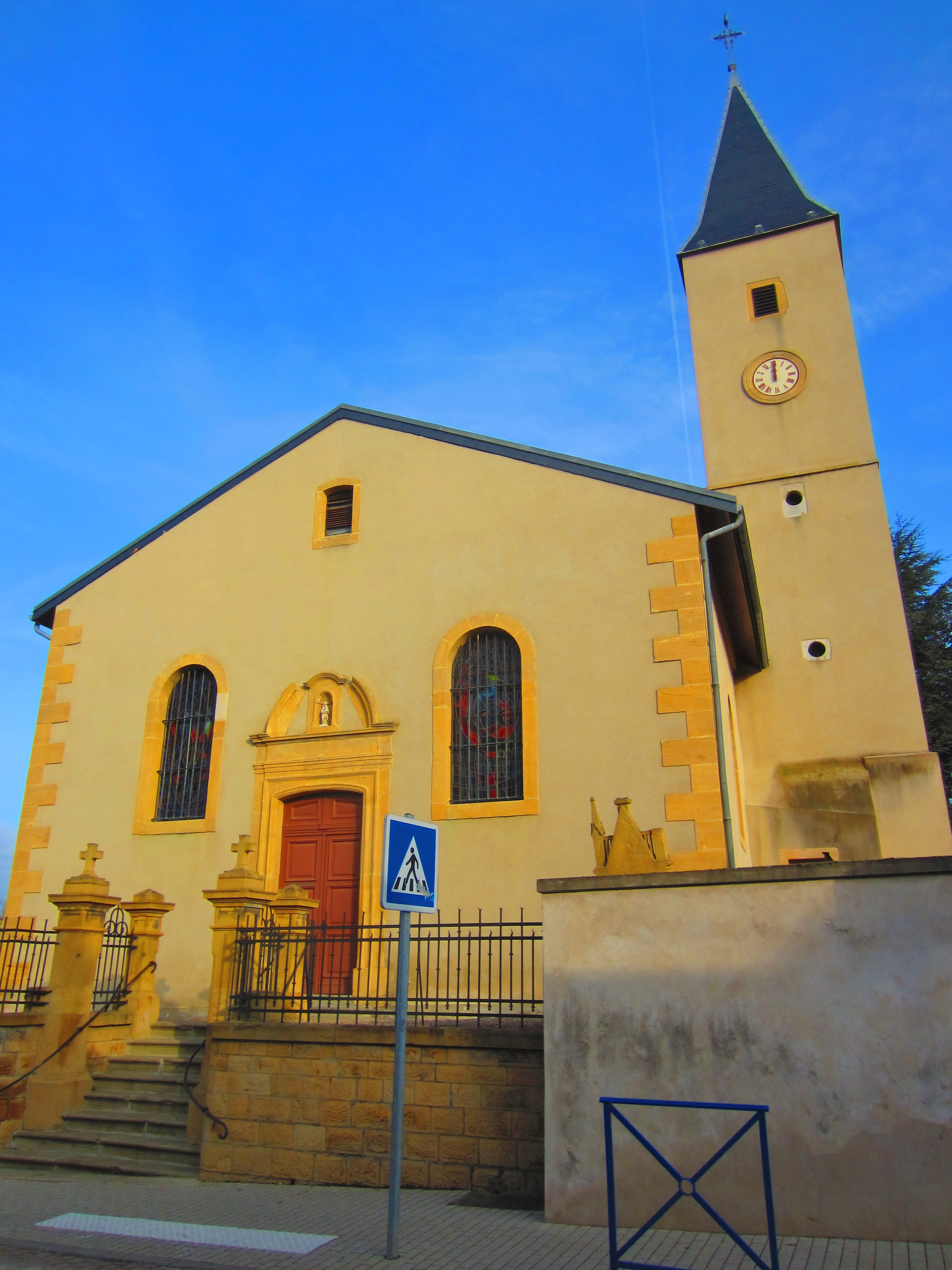
- The church in Charly-Oradour

- Coat of arms
- Location of Charly-Oradour
- Location within France Location within Grand Est
- Coordinates: 49°10′30″N 6°14′24″E
- Country: France
- Region: Grand Est
- Department: Moselle
- Arrondissement: Metz
- Canton: Le Pays Messin
- Intercommunality: CC Rives de Moselle

Government
  - Mayor (2020–2026): René Huberty
- Area^{1}: 6.77 km^{2} (2.61 sq mi)
- Elevation: 190 m (620 ft)
- Highest elevation: 245 m (804 ft)
- Lowest elevation: 177 m (581 ft)
- Population (2023): 810
  - Density: 120/km^{2} (310/sq mi)
- Time zone: UTC+01:00 (CET)
  - Summer (DST): UTC+02:00 (CEST)
- INSEE/Postal code: 57129 /57640
- ^{1} French Land Register data, which excludes lakes, ponds, glaciers > 1 km^{2} (0.386 sq mi or 247 acres) and river estuaries.

Charly-Oradour (French pronunciation: [ʃaʁli ɔʁaduʁ]; German: Karlen) is a commune in the Moselle department in Grand Est in north-eastern France.

== See also ==
- Communes of the Moselle department
