= Laquenexy =

- Commune
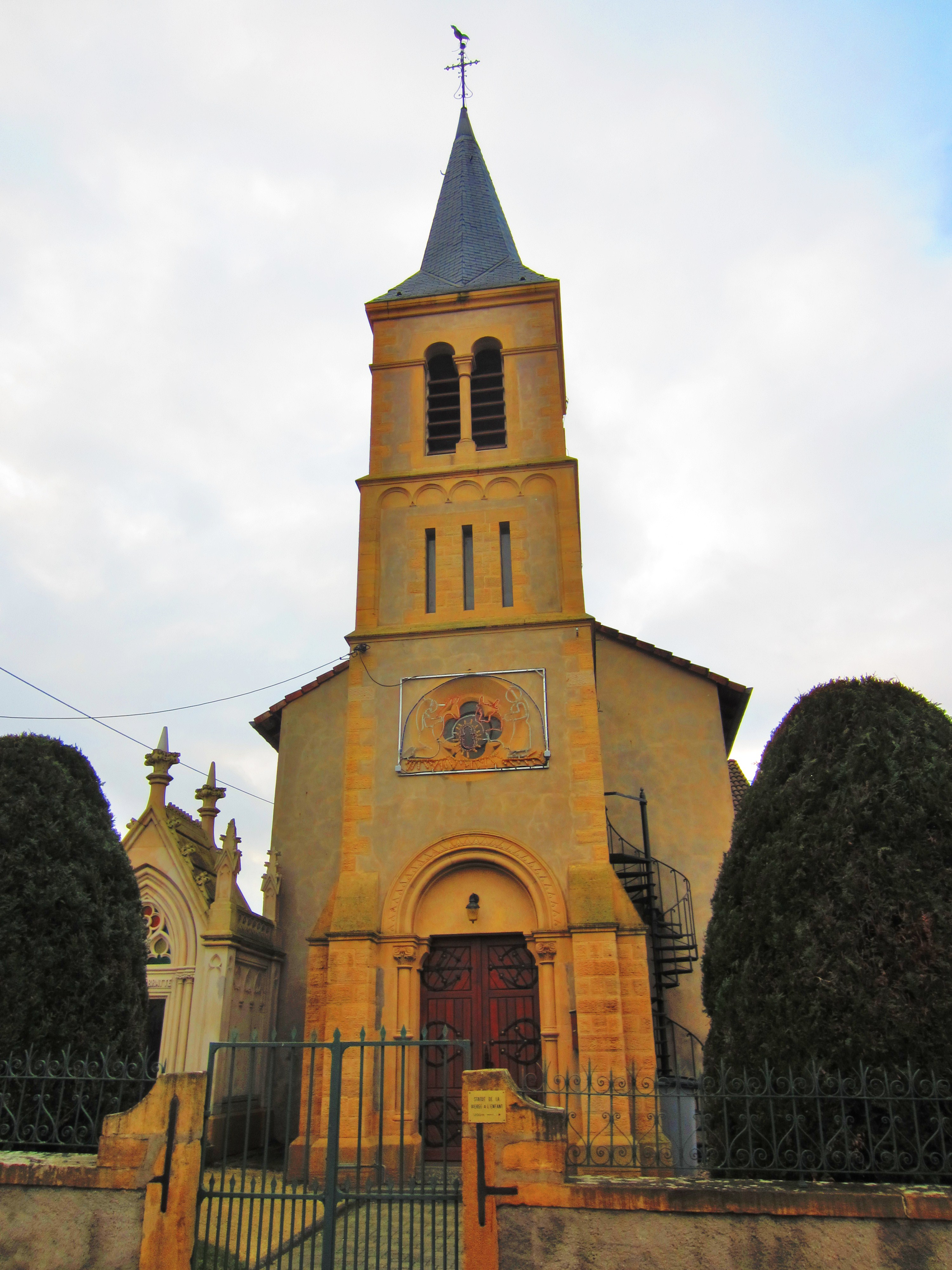
- The church in Laquenexy

- Coat of arms
- Location of Laquenexy
- Location within France Location within Grand Est
- Coordinates: 49°04′59″N 6°18′40″E
- Country: France
- Region: Grand Est
- Department: Moselle
- Arrondissement: Metz
- Canton: Le Pays Messin
- Intercommunality: Metz Métropole

Government
  - Mayor (2020–2026): Patrick Grivel
- Area^{1}: 9.09 km^{2} (3.51 sq mi)
- Elevation: 300 m (980 ft)
- Highest elevation: 270 m (890 ft)
- Lowest elevation: 215 m (705 ft)
- Population (2023): 1,255
  - Density: 138/km^{2} (358/sq mi)
- Time zone: UTC+01:00 (CET)
  - Summer (DST): UTC+02:00 (CEST)
- INSEE/Postal code: 57385 /57530
- ^{1} French Land Register data, which excludes lakes, ponds, glaciers > 1 km^{2} (0.386 sq mi or 247 acres) and river estuaries.

Laquenexy (French pronunciation: [lakənɛksi]; German: Kenchen) is a commune in the Moselle department in Grand Est in north-eastern France.

== See also ==
- Communes of the Moselle department
