= Argancy =

- Commune
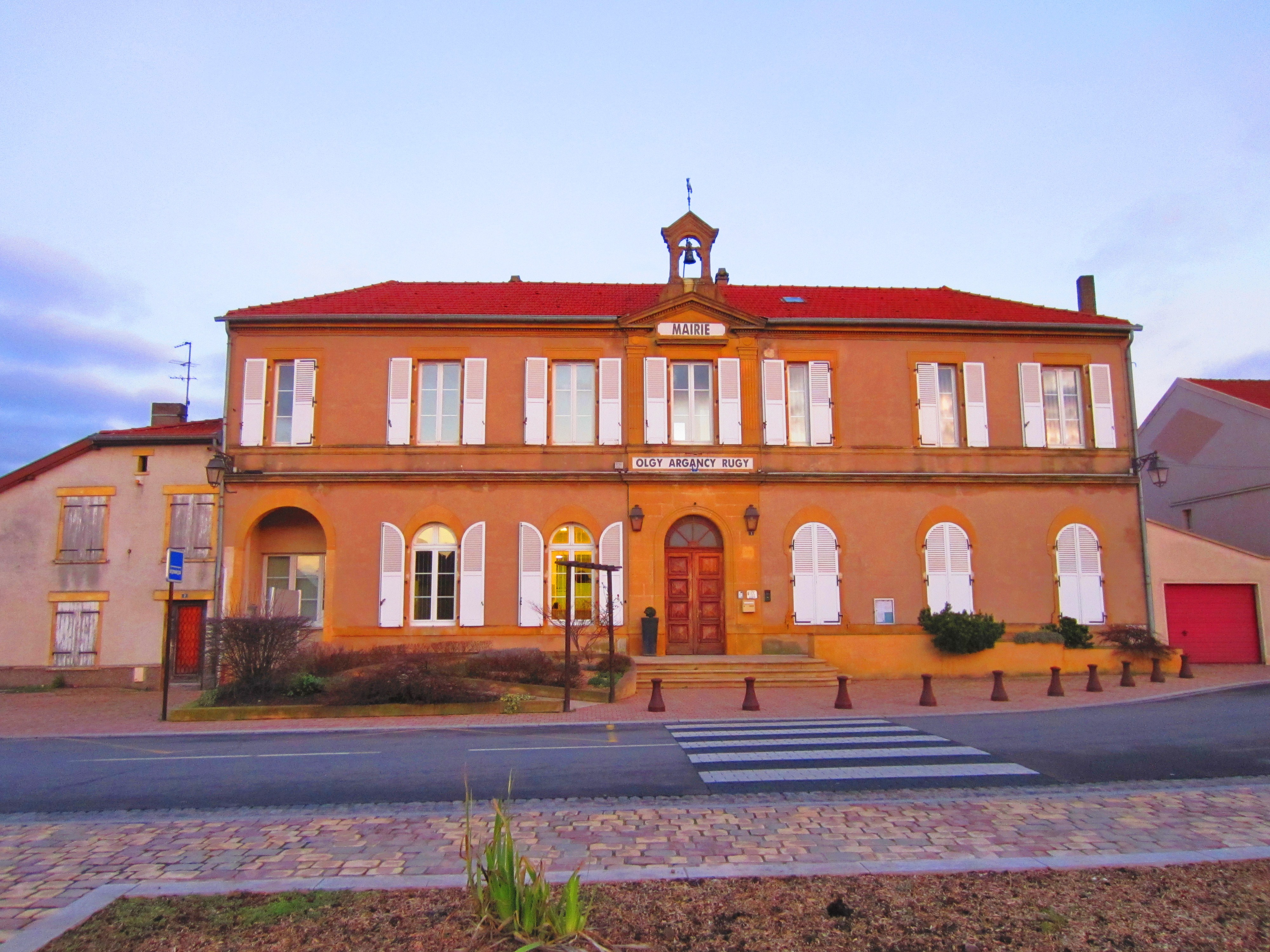
- The town hall in Argancy

- Coat of arms
- Location of Argancy
- Location within France Location within Grand Est
- Coordinates: 49°11′48″N 6°12′12″E
- Country: France
- Region: Grand Est
- Department: Moselle
- Arrondissement: Metz
- Canton: Le Pays Messin

Government
  - Mayor (2020–2026): Jocelyne Emmendoerffer
- Area^{1}: 11.45 km^{2} (4.42 sq mi)
- Elevation: 150 m (490 ft)
- Highest elevation: 210 m (690 ft)
- Lowest elevation: 158 m (518 ft)
- Population (2023): 1,381
  - Density: 120.6/km^{2} (312.4/sq mi)
- Time zone: UTC+01:00 (CET)
  - Summer (DST): UTC+02:00 (CEST)
- INSEE/Postal code: 57028 /57640
- ^{1} French Land Register data, which excludes lakes, ponds, glaciers > 1 km^{2} (0.386 sq mi or 247 acres) and river estuaries.

Argancy (French pronunciation: [aʁɡɑ̃si]; German: Argannen) is a commune in the Moselle department in Grand Est in northeastern France.

== Population ==
Historical population
Year	Pop.	±% p.a.
1968	731	—
1975	758	+0.52%
1982	1,007	+4.14%
1990	1,058	+0.62%
1999	1,103	+0.46%
2007	1,334	+2.41%
2012	1,329	−0.08%
2017	1,343	+0.21%
2023	1,381	+0.47%
Source: INSEE

== See also ==
- Communes of the Moselle department
