= Charleville-sous-Bois =

- Commune
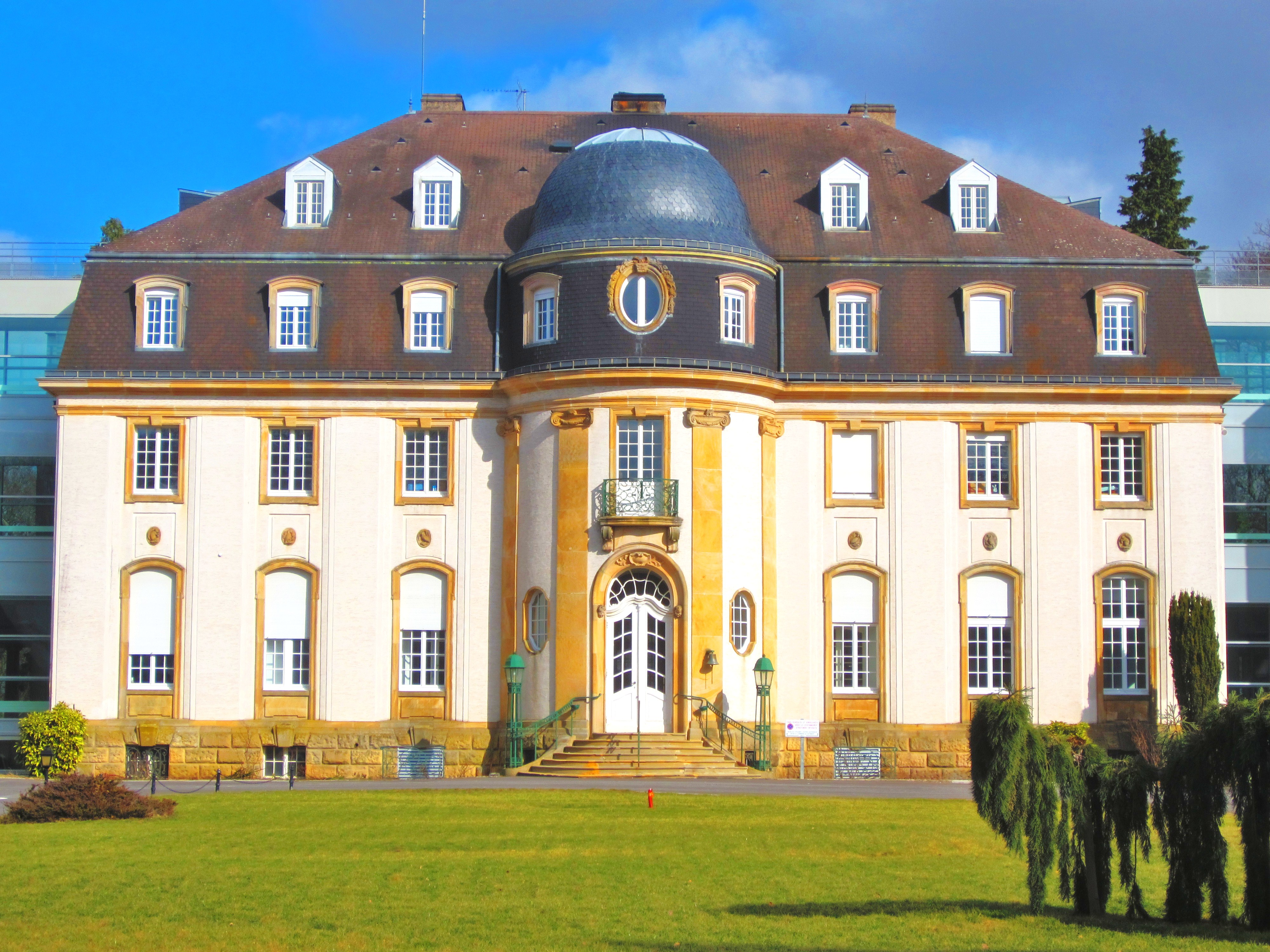
- The chateau in Charleville-sous-Bois

- Coat of arms
- Location of Charleville-sous-Bois
- Location within France Location within Grand Est
- Coordinates: 49°11′25″N 6°24′46″E
- Country: France
- Region: Grand Est
- Department: Moselle
- Arrondissement: Metz
- Canton: Le Pays Messin
- Intercommunality: Haut Chemin - Pays de Pange

Government
  - Mayor (2020–2026): Jérôme Cridelich
- Area^{1}: 12.82 km^{2} (4.95 sq mi)
- Elevation: 245 m (804 ft)
- Highest elevation: 347 m (1,138 ft)
- Lowest elevation: 215 m (705 ft)
- Population (2023): 284
  - Density: 22.2/km^{2} (57.4/sq mi)
- Time zone: UTC+01:00 (CET)
  - Summer (DST): UTC+02:00 (CEST)
- INSEE/Postal code: 57128 /57220
- ^{1} French Land Register data, which excludes lakes, ponds, glaciers > 1 km^{2} (0.386 sq mi or 247 acres) and river estuaries.

Charleville-sous-Bois (French pronunciation: [ʃaʁləvil su bwa]; German: Karlheim) is a commune in the Moselle department in Grand Est in north-eastern France.

Localities of the commune: Épange, Mussy-l’Évêque, Nidange, Rénange, Saint-Michel.

== See also ==
- Communes of the Moselle department
