= Marsilly, Moselle =

Marsilly
- Commune
- Coat of arms
- Location of Marsilly
- Location within France Location within Grand Est
- Coordinates: 49°06′00″N 6°17′50″E
- Country: France
- Region: Grand Est
- Department: Moselle
- Arrondissement: Metz
- Canton: Le Pays Messin
- Intercommunality: Haut Chemin - Pays de Pange

Government
  - Mayor (2020–2026): Bernard Barré
- Area^{1}: 3.22 km^{2} (1.24 sq mi)
- Elevation: 245 m (804 ft)
- Highest elevation: 269 m (883 ft)
- Lowest elevation: 234 m (768 ft)
- Population (2023): 582
  - Density: 181/km^{2} (468/sq mi)
- Time zone: UTC+01:00 (CET)
  - Summer (DST): UTC+02:00 (CEST)
- INSEE/Postal code: 57449 /57530
- ^{1} French Land Register data, which excludes lakes, ponds, glaciers > 1 km^{2} (0.386 sq mi or 247 acres) and river estuaries.

Marsilly (French pronunciation: [maʁsiji]; German: Marzellingen) is a commune in the Moselle department in Grand Est in north-eastern France.

== See also ==
- Communes of the Moselle department
