= Chailly-lès-Ennery =

- Commune
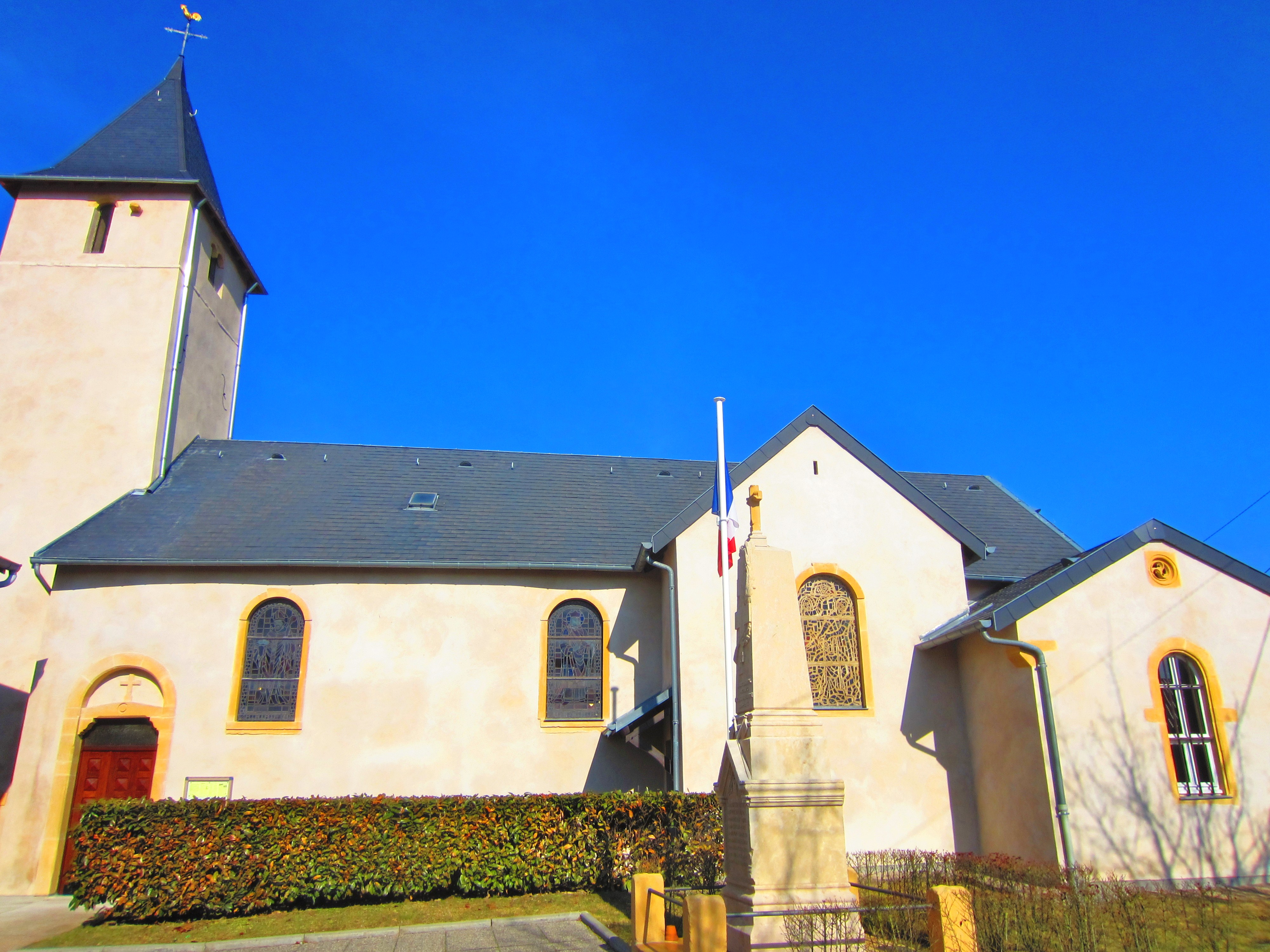
- The church in Chailly-lès-Ennery

- Coat of arms
- Location of Chailly-lès-Ennery
- Location within France Location within Grand Est
- Coordinates: 49°12′26″N 6°14′12″E
- Country: France
- Region: Grand Est
- Department: Moselle
- Arrondissement: Metz
- Canton: Le Pays Messin
- Intercommunality: CC Rives de Moselle

Government
  - Mayor (2020–2026): Gilbert Turck
- Area^{1}: 7.29 km^{2} (2.81 sq mi)
- Elevation: 180 m (590 ft)
- Highest elevation: 244 m (801 ft)
- Lowest elevation: 169 m (554 ft)
- Population (2023): 394
  - Density: 54.0/km^{2} (140/sq mi)
- Time zone: UTC+01:00 (CET)
  - Summer (DST): UTC+02:00 (CEST)
- INSEE/Postal code: 57125 /57365
- ^{1} French Land Register data, which excludes lakes, ponds, glaciers > 1 km^{2} (0.386 sq mi or 247 acres) and river estuaries.

Chailly-lès-Ennery (French pronunciation: [ʃaji lɛ.z‿ɛnʁi], literally Chailly near Ennery; German: Kettenchen) is a commune in the Moselle department in Grand Est in north-eastern France.

== See also ==
- Communes of the Moselle department
