= Arrondissement of Metz-Campagne =

Coordinates: 49.12°N 6.17°E

Metz-Campagne
- Former arrondissement
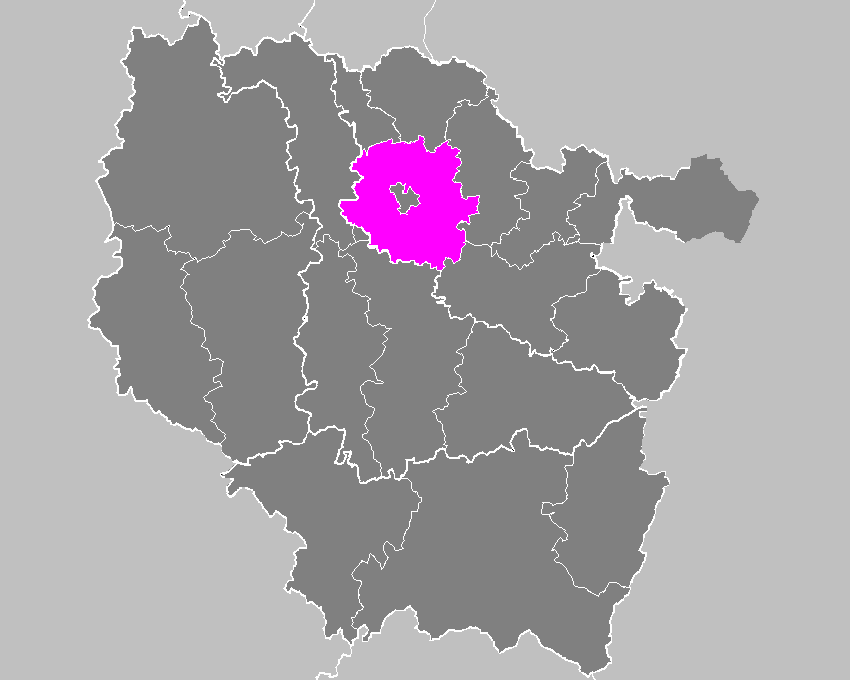
- Location within the former region Lorraine
- Country: France
- Region: Grand Est
- Department: Moselle
- No. of communes: {{{nbcomm}}}
- Disbanded: 2015
- Area: 1,052 km^{2} (406 sq mi)
- Population (2012): 222,352
  - Density: 211.4/km^{2} (547.4/sq mi)

The arrondissement of Metz-Campagne is a former arrondissement of France in the Moselle department in the Lorraine region. In 2015 it was merged into the new arrondissement of Metz. It had 142 communes, and its population was 222,352 (2012).

== Composition ==
The communes of the arrondissement of Metz-Campagne, and their INSEE codes, were:

1. Amanvillers (57017)	2. Amnéville (57019)	3. Ancerville (57020)
4. Ancy-sur-Moselle (57021)	5. Antilly (57024)	6. Argancy (57028)
7. Arry (57030)	8. Ars-Laquenexy (57031)	9. Ars-sur-Moselle (57032)
10. Aube (57037)	11. Augny (57039)	12. Ay-sur-Moselle (57043)
13. Bazoncourt (57055)	14. Beux (57075)	15. Bronvaux (57111)
16. Buchy (57116)	17. Burtoncourt (57121)	18. Béchy (57057)
19. Chailly-lès-Ennery (57125)	20. Chanville (57127)	21. Charleville-sous-Bois (57128)
22. Charly-Oradour (57129)	23. Cheminot (57137)	24. Chesny (57140)
25. Chieulles (57142)	26. Châtel-Saint-Germain (57134)	27. Chérisey (57139)
28. Coin-lès-Cuvry (57146)	29. Coin-sur-Seille (57147)	30. Coincy (57145)
31. Colligny (57148)	32. Corny-sur-Moselle (57153)	33. Courcelles-Chaussy (57155)
34. Courcelles-sur-Nied (57156)	35. Cuvry (57162)	36. Dornot (57184)
37. Ennery (57193)	38. Failly (57204)	39. Fleury (57218)
40. Flocourt (57220)	41. Flévy (57219)	42. Foville (57231)
43. Fèves (57211)	44. Féy (57212)	45. Glatigny (57249)
46. Goin (57251)	47. Gorze (57254)	48. Gravelotte (57256)
49. Hagondange (57283)	50. Hauconcourt (57303)	51. Hayes (57307)
52. Jouy-aux-Arches (57350)	53. Jury (57351)	54. Jussy (57352)
55. La Maxe (57452)	56. Laquenexy (57385)	57. Le Ban-Saint-Martin (57049)
58. Lemud (57392)	59. Les Étangs (57200)	60. Lessy (57396)
61. Liéhon (57403)	62. Longeville-lès-Metz (57412)	63. Lorry-Mardigny (57416)
64. Lorry-lès-Metz (57415)	65. Louvigny (57422)	66. Luppy (57425)
67. Maizeroy (57431)	68. Maizery (57432)	69. Maizières-lès-Metz (57433)
70. Malroy (57438)	71. Marange-Silvange (57443)	72. Marieulles (57445)
73. Marly (57447)	74. Marsilly (57449)	75. Mey (57467)
76. Moncheux (57472)	77. Montigny-lès-Metz (57480)	78. Montois-la-Montagne (57481)
79. Montoy-Flanville (57482)	80. Moulins-lès-Metz (57487)	81. Mécleuves (57454)
82. Noisseville (57510)	83. Norroy-le-Veneur (57511)	84. Nouilly (57512)
85. Novéant-sur-Moselle (57515)	86. Ogy (57523)	87. Orny (57527)
88. Pagny-lès-Goin (57532)	89. Pange (57533)	90. Peltre (57534)
91. Pierrevillers (57543)	92. Plappeville (57545)	93. Plesnois (57546)
94. Pommérieux (57547)	95. Pontoy (57548)	96. Pouilly (57552)
97. Pournoy-la-Chétive (57553)	98. Pournoy-la-Grasse (57554)	99. Raville (57563)
100. Retonfey (57575)	101. Rezonville (57578)	102. Rombas (57591)
103. Roncourt (57593)	104. Rozérieulles (57601)	105. Rémilly (57572)
106. Sailly-Achâtel (57605)	107. Saint-Hubert (57612)	108. Saint-Julien-lès-Metz (57616)
109. Saint-Jure (57617)	110. Saint-Privat-la-Montagne (57622)	111. Sainte-Barbe (57607)
112. Sainte-Marie-aux-Chênes (57620)	113. Sainte-Ruffine (57624)	114. Sanry-lès-Vigy (57626)
115. Sanry-sur-Nied (57627)	116. Saulny (57634)	117. Scy-Chazelles (57642)
118. Secourt (57643)	119. Semécourt (57645)	120. Servigny-lès-Raville (57648)
121. Servigny-lès-Sainte-Barbe (57649)	122. Sillegny (57652)	123. Silly-en-Saulnois (57653)
124. Silly-sur-Nied (57654)	125. Solgne (57655)	126. Sorbey (57656)
127. Talange (57663)	128. Thimonville (57671)	129. Tragny (57676)
130. Trémery (57677)	131. Vantoux (57693)	132. Vany (57694)
133. Vaux (57701)	134. Verny (57708)	135. Vernéville (57707)
136. Vigny (57715)	137. Vigy (57716)	138. Villers-Stoncourt (57718)
139. Vionville (57722)	140. Vry (57736)	141. Vulmont (57737)
142. Woippy (57751)		

== History ==
The arrondissement of Metz-Campagne was created in 1919. It was disbanded in 2015. As a result of the reorganisation of the cantons of France which came into effect in 2015, the borders of the cantons are no longer related to the borders of the arrondissements. The cantons of the arrondissement of Metz-Campagne were, as of January 2015:

1. Ars-sur-Moselle
2. Maizières-lès-Metz
3. Marange-Silvange
4. Montigny-lès-Metz
5. Pange
6. Rombas
7. Verny
8. Vigy
9. Woippy
