= Battle of Noisseville =

Coordinates: 49.1353°N 6.2744°E

- Part of the Franco-Prussian War
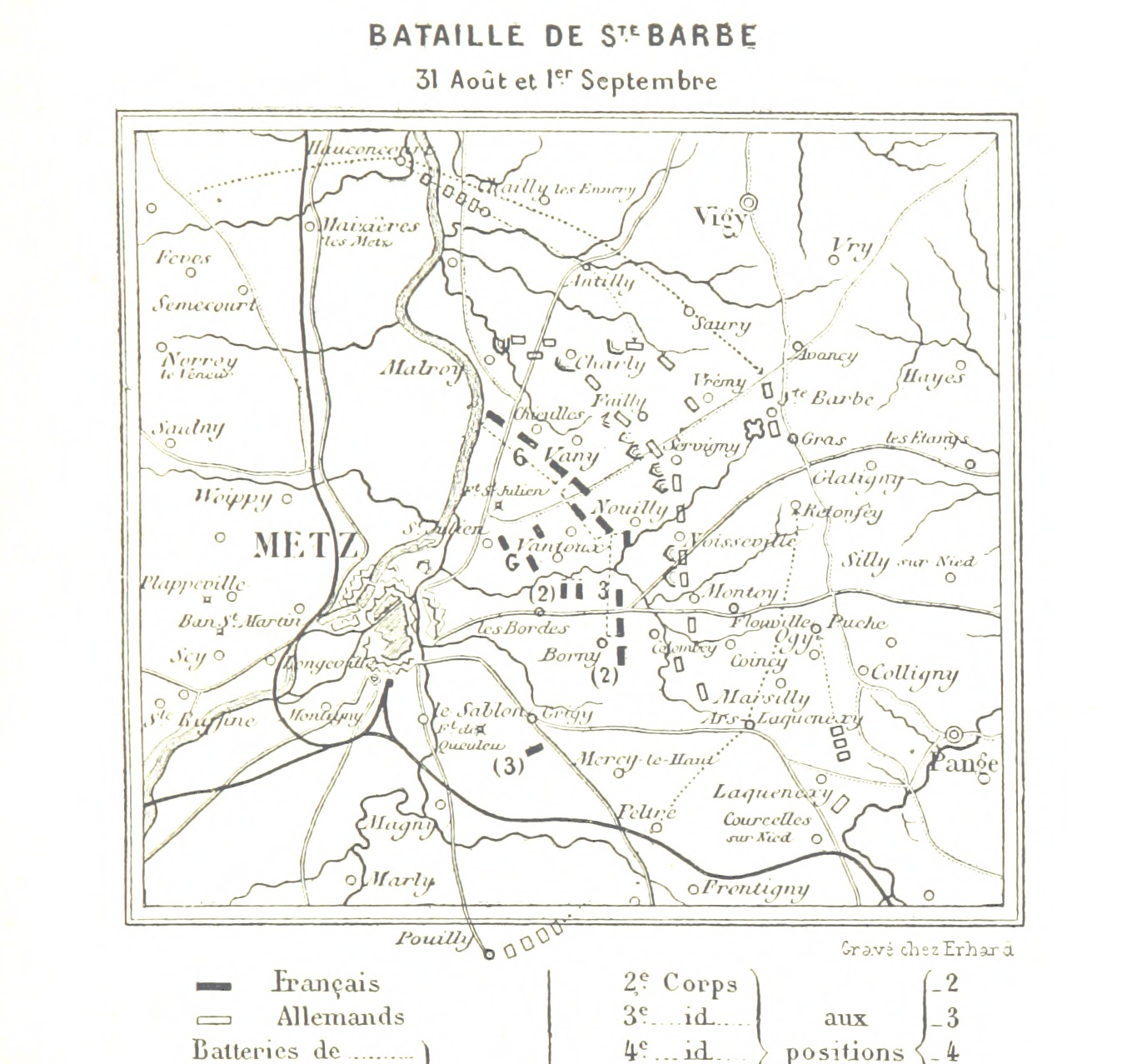
- Battle of Noisseville (theater of war), here named the Battle of Sainte-Barbe
Date	31 August – 1 September 1870
Location	near Noisseville, France
Result	Prussian victory

Belligerents
(Kingdom of Prussia) Prussia; Hesse-Darmstadt	France

Commanders and leaders
(Kingdom of Prussia) Frederick Charles	François Achille Bazaine

Strength
69,000 soldiers 204 guns	95,900 soldiers 288 guns

Casualties and losses
2,850 soldiers 126 officers	3,401 soldiers 146 officers

The Battle of Noisseville on 31 August 1870 was fought during the Franco-Prussian War and ended in a Prussian victory.

Traveling from Metz, the French forces under Marshal François Achille Bazaine attempted to break through the investing line of the Prussian forces under Prince Frederick Charles. At first, the French had slight success, and maintained the ground they won during the day. But on 1 September the French were driven back into Metz, with a loss of 3,379 soldiers and 145 officers. The Prussians lost 2,850 soldiers and 126 officers.
