= Eurométropole de Metz =

Coordinates: 49.12°N 6.18°E

- Métropole

- Location within the Moselle department
- Country: France
- Region: Grand Est
- Department: Moselle
- No. of communes: {{{nbcomm}}}
- Established: January 2014

Government
  - President (2020-2026): François Grosdidier (LR)
- Area: 324.10 km^{2} (125.14 sq mi)
- Population (2020): 228,038
  - Density: 703.60/km^{2} (1,822.3/sq mi)

Eurométropole de Metz (French pronunciation: [øʁɔmetʁɔpɔl də mɛs]) is the métropole, an intercommunal structure, centred on the city of Metz. It is located in the Moselle department, in the Grand Est region, northeastern France. It was created as a communauté d'agglomération in January 2014, and became a métropole in January 2018. Its area is 312.8 km^{2}. Its population was 224,863 in 2019.

== Composition ==
The métropole consists of the following 46 communes:

1. Amanvillers
2. Ars-Laquenexy
3. Ars-sur-Moselle
4. Augny
5. Le Ban-Saint-Martin
6. Châtel-Saint-Germain
7. Chesny
8. Chieulles
9. Coin-lès-Cuvry
10. Coin-sur-Seille
11. Cuvry
12. Féy
13. Gravelotte
14. Jury
15. Jussy
16. Laquenexy
17. Lessy
18. Longeville-lès-Metz
19. Lorry-lès-Metz
20. Lorry-Mardigny
21. Marieulles
22. Marly
23. La Maxe
24. Mécleuves
25. Metz
26. Mey
27. Montigny-lès-Metz
28. Moulins-lès-Metz
29. Noisseville
30. Nouilly
31. Peltre
32. Plappeville
33. Pouilly
34. Pournoy-la-Chétive
35. Roncourt
36. Rozérieulles
37. Sainte-Ruffine
38. Saint-Julien-lès-Metz
39. Saint-Privat-la-Montagne
40. Saulny
41. Scy-Chazelles
42. Vantoux
43. Vany
44. Vaux
45. Vernéville
46. Woippy
