= Jussy =

Jussy may refer to several places:

== France ==
- Jussy, Moselle, in the Moselle département
- Jussy, Yonne, in the Yonne département
- Jussy, Aisne, in the Aisne département
- Jussy-Champagne, in the Cher département
- Jussy-le-Chaudrier, in the Cher département
- Pers-Jussy, in the Haute-Savoie département

== Switzerland ==
- Jussy, Switzerland
