= Coin-lès-Cuvry =

- Commune
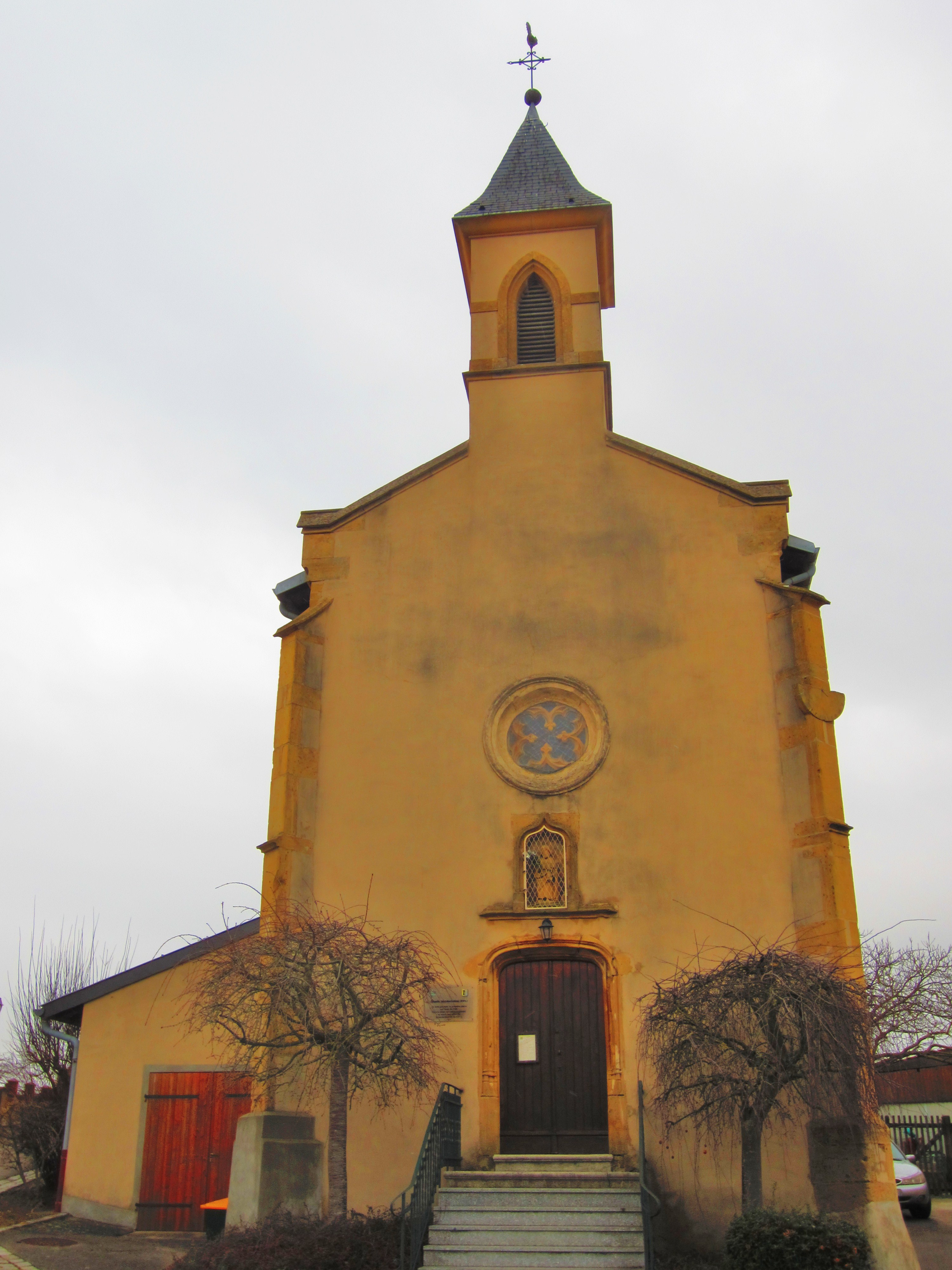
- The church in Coin-lès-Cuvry

- Coat of arms
- Location of Coin-lès-Cuvry
- Location within France Location within Grand Est
- Coordinates: 49°02′05″N 6°09′25″E
- Country: France
- Region: Grand Est
- Department: Moselle
- Arrondissement: Metz
- Canton: Les Coteaux de Moselle
- Intercommunality: Metz Métropole

Government
  - Mayor (2020–2026): Anne-Marie Linden-Guesdon
- Area^{1}: 6.65 km^{2} (2.57 sq mi)
- Elevation: 170 m (560 ft)
- Highest elevation: 235 m (771 ft)
- Lowest elevation: 171 m (561 ft)
- Population (2023): 824
  - Density: 124/km^{2} (321/sq mi)
- Time zone: UTC+01:00 (CET)
  - Summer (DST): UTC+02:00 (CEST)
- INSEE/Postal code: 57146 /57420
- ^{1} French Land Register data, which excludes lakes, ponds, glaciers > 1 km^{2} (0.386 sq mi or 247 acres) and river estuaries.

Coin-lès-Cuvry (French pronunciation: [kwɛ̃ lɛ kyvʁi], literally Corner near Cuvry; German: Kuberneck) is a commune in the Moselle department in Grand Est in north-eastern France.

== See also ==
- Communes of the Moselle department
