= Jouy-aux-Arches =

- Commune
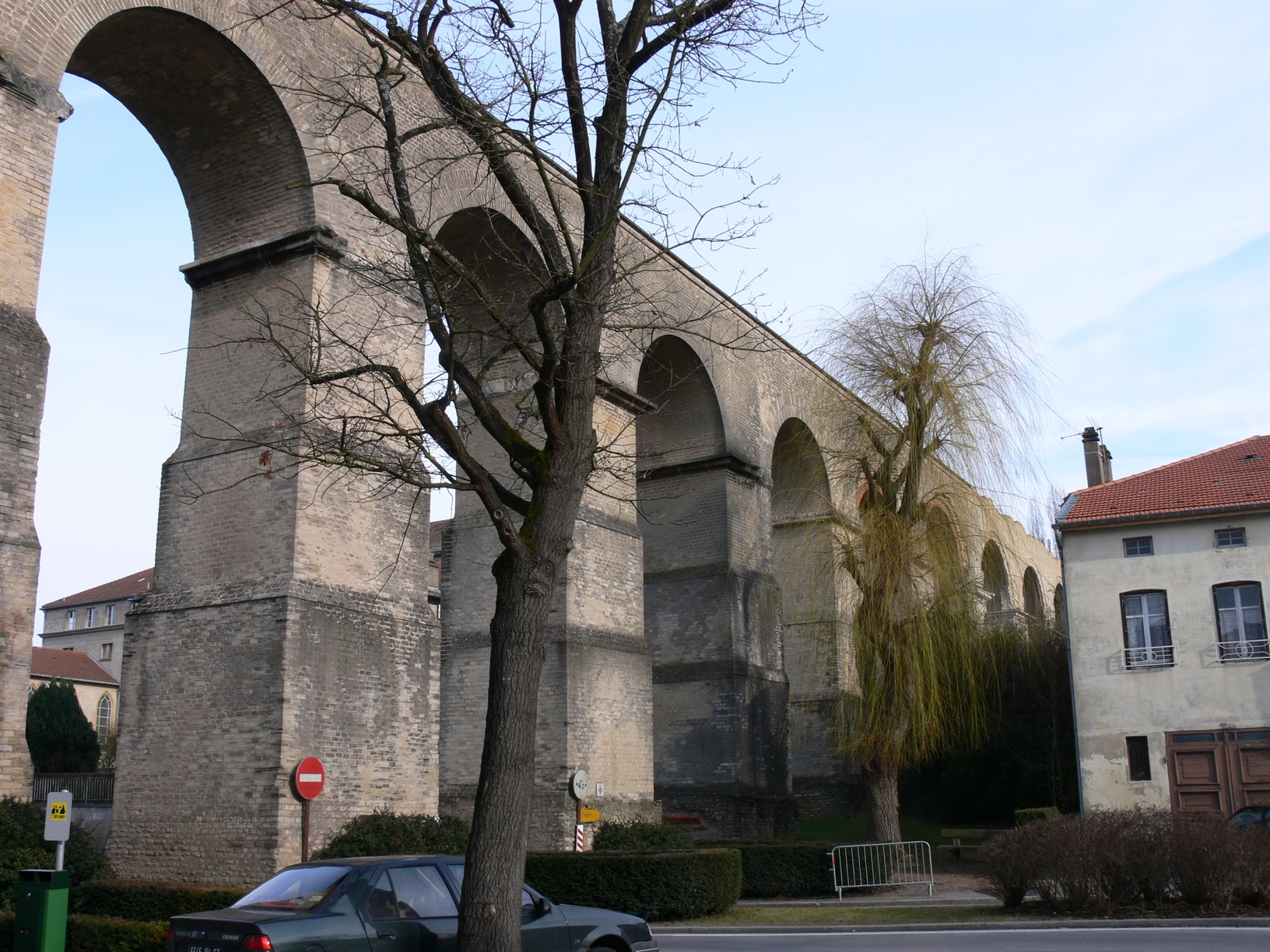
- The remains of the Roman aqueduct in Jouy-aux-Arches

- Coat of arms
- Location of Jouy-aux-Arches
- Location within France Location within Grand Est
- Coordinates: 49°03′44″N 6°04′44″E
- Country: France
- Region: Grand Est
- Department: Moselle
- Arrondissement: Metz
- Canton: Les Coteaux de Moselle
- Intercommunality: Mad et Moselle

Government
  - Mayor (2020–2026): Patrick Bolay
- Area^{1}: 6.01 km^{2} (2.32 sq mi)
- Highest elevation: 314 m (1,030 ft)
- Lowest elevation: 165 m (541 ft)
- Population (2023): 1,430
  - Density: 238/km^{2} (616/sq mi)
- Demonym(s): Gaudassien, Gaudassienne
- Time zone: UTC+01:00 (CET)
  - Summer (DST): UTC+02:00 (CEST)
- INSEE/Postal code: 57350 /57130
- ^{1} French Land Register data, which excludes lakes, ponds, glaciers > 1 km^{2} (0.386 sq mi or 247 acres) and river estuaries.

Jouy-aux-Arches (French pronunciation: [ʒwi o.z‿aʁʃ]; German: Gaudach) is a commune in the Moselle department in Grand Est in north-eastern France. The remains of a Roman aqueduct from the 1st century have been preserved on the territory of Jouy-aux-Arches and the neighbouring commune Ars-sur-Moselle.

== See also ==
- Communes of the Moselle department
