= Arrondissement of Metz-Ville =

Coordinates: 49.09°N 6.19°E

Metz-Ville
- Former arrondissement
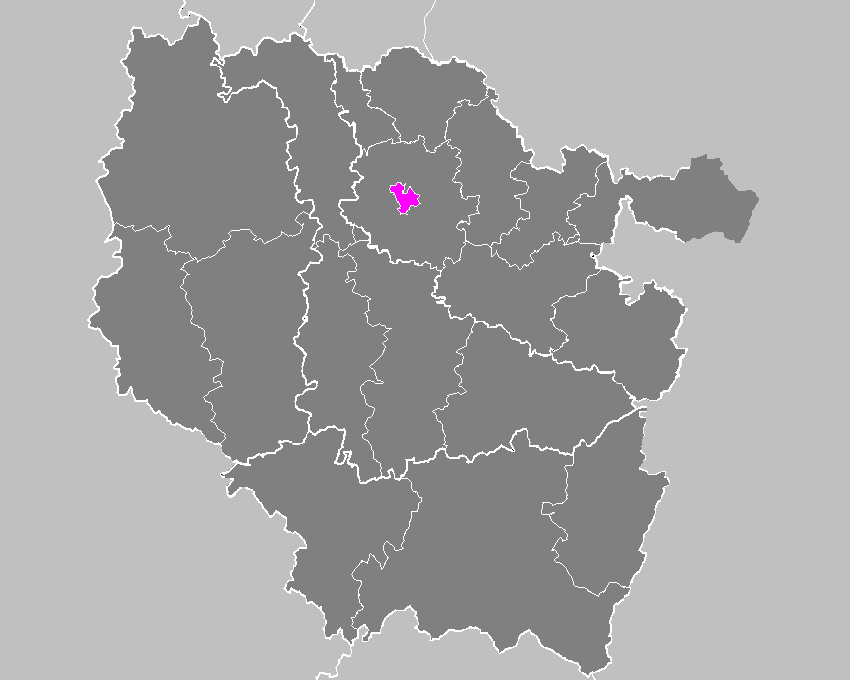
- Location within the former region Lorraine
- Country: France
- Region: Grand Est
- Department: Moselle
- No. of communes: {{{nbcomm}}}
- Disbanded: 2015
- Area: 41.9 km^{2} (16.2 sq mi)
- Population (2012): 119,551
  - Density: 2,850/km^{2} (7,390/sq mi)

The arrondissement of Metz-Ville is a former arrondissement of France in the Moselle department in the Lorraine region. In 2015 it was merged into the new arrondissement of Metz. It had 1 commune, and its population was 119,551 (2012).

== Composition ==
The only commune of the arrondissement of Metz-Ville was Metz (INSEE code 57463).

== History ==
The arrondissement of Metz-Ville was created in 1919. It was disbanded in 2015. As a result of the reorganisation of the cantons of France which came into effect in 2015, the borders of the cantons are no longer related to the borders of the arrondissements. The cantons of the arrondissement of Metz-Ville were, as of January 2015:

1. Metz-Ville 1st Canton
2. Metz-Ville 2nd Canton
3. Metz-Ville 3rd Canton
4. Metz-Ville 4th Canton
