= Arrondissement of Metz =

Coordinates: 49.1°N 6.2°E

Metz
- Arrondissement
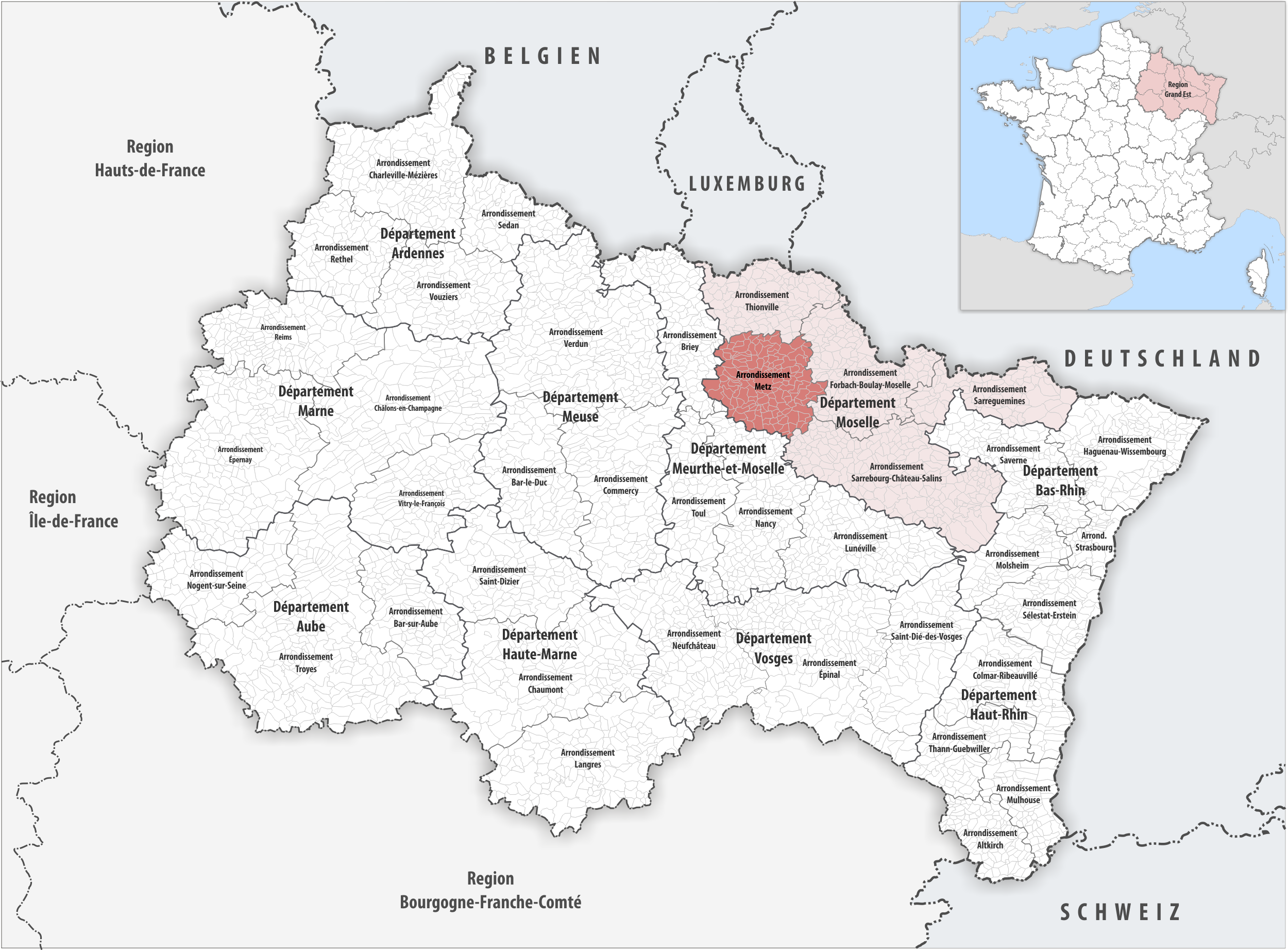
- Location within the region Grand Est
- Country: France
- Region: Grand Est
- Department: Moselle
- No. of communes: {{{nbcomm}}}
- Area: 1,088.7 km^{2} (420.3 sq mi)
- Population (2023): 356,297
  - Density: 327.27/km^{2} (847.62/sq mi)
- INSEE code: 579

The arrondissement of Metz is an arrondissement of France in the Moselle department in the Grand Est region. It has 139 communes. Its population is 352,594 (2021), and its area is 1,088.7 km^{2} (420.3 sq mi).

== Composition ==
The communes of the arrondissement of Metz are:

1. Amanvillers
2. Amnéville
3. Ancerville
4. Ancy-Dornot
5. Antilly
6. Argancy
7. Arry
8. Ars-Laquenexy
9. Ars-sur-Moselle
10. Aube
11. Augny
12. Ay-sur-Moselle
13. Le Ban-Saint-Martin
14. Bazoncourt
15. Béchy
16. Beux
17. Bronvaux
18. Buchy
19. Burtoncourt
20. Chailly-lès-Ennery
21. Chanville
22. Charleville-sous-Bois
23. Charly-Oradour
24. Châtel-Saint-Germain
25. Cheminot
26. Chérisey
27. Chesny
28. Chieulles
29. Coincy
30. Coin-lès-Cuvry
31. Coin-sur-Seille
32. Colligny-Maizery
33. Corny-sur-Moselle
34. Courcelles-Chaussy
35. Courcelles-sur-Nied
36. Cuvry
37. Ennery
38. Les Étangs
39. Failly
40. Fèves
41. Féy
42. Fleury
43. Flévy
44. Flocourt
45. Foville
46. Glatigny
47. Goin
48. Gorze
49. Gravelotte
50. Hagondange
51. Hauconcourt
52. Hayes
53. Jouy-aux-Arches
54. Jury
55. Jussy
56. Laquenexy
57. Lemud
58. Lessy
59. Liéhon
60. Longeville-lès-Metz
61. Lorry-lès-Metz
62. Lorry-Mardigny
63. Louvigny
64. Luppy
65. Maizeroy
66. Maizières-lès-Metz
67. Malroy
68. Marange-Silvange
69. Marieulles
70. Marly
71. Marsilly
72. La Maxe
73. Mécleuves
74. Metz
75. Mey
76. Moncheux
77. Montigny-lès-Metz
78. Montois-la-Montagne
79. Moulins-lès-Metz
80. Noisseville
81. Norroy-le-Veneur
82. Nouilly
83. Novéant-sur-Moselle
84. Ogy-Montoy-Flanville
85. Orny
86. Pagny-lès-Goin
87. Pange
88. Peltre
89. Pierrevillers
90. Plappeville
91. Plesnois
92. Pommérieux
93. Rombas
94. Pontoy
95. Pouilly
96. Pournoy-la-Chétive
97. Pournoy-la-Grasse
98. Raville
99. Rémilly
100. Retonfey
101. Rezonville-Vionville
102. Roncourt
103. Rozérieulles
104. Sailly-Achâtel
105. Sainte-Barbe
106. Sainte-Marie-aux-Chênes
107. Sainte-Ruffine
108. Saint-Hubert
109. Saint-Julien-lès-Metz
110. Saint-Jure
111. Saint-Privat-la-Montagne
112. Sanry-lès-Vigy
113. Sanry-sur-Nied
114. Saulny
115. Scy-Chazelles
116. Secourt
117. Semécourt
118. Servigny-lès-Raville
119. Servigny-lès-Sainte-Barbe
120. Sillegny
121. Silly-en-Saulnois
122. Silly-sur-Nied
123. Solgne
124. Sorbey
125. Talange
126. Thimonville
127. Tragny
128. Trémery
129. Vantoux
130. Vany
131. Vaux
132. Vernéville
133. Verny
134. Vigny
135. Vigy
136. Villers-Stoncourt
137. Vry
138. Vulmont
139. Woippy

== History ==
The arrondissement of Metz was created in 1800 and disbanded in 1871 (ceded to Germany). The arrondissement of Metz was restored in January 2015 by the merger of the former arrondissements of Metz-Campagne and Metz-Ville.
