= Canton of Les Coteaux de Moselle =

Coordinates: 49.10°N 6.11°E

The canton of Les Coteaux de Moselle is an administrative division of the Moselle department, northeastern France. It was created at the French canton reorganisation which came into effect in March 2015. Its seat is in Moulins-lès-Metz.

It consists of the following communes:

1. Ancy-Dornot
2. Arry
3. Ars-sur-Moselle
4. Augny
5. Châtel-Saint-Germain
6. Coin-lès-Cuvry
7. Coin-sur-Seille
8. Corny-sur-Moselle
9. Cuvry
10. Féy
11. Gorze
12. Gravelotte
13. Jouy-aux-Arches
14. Jussy
15. Lessy
16. Lorry-lès-Metz
17. Lorry-Mardigny
18. Marieulles
19. Moulins-lès-Metz
20. Novéant-sur-Moselle
21. Pouilly
22. Pournoy-la-Chétive
23. Rezonville-Vionville
24. Rozérieulles
25. Sainte-Ruffine
26. Vaux
27. Vernéville
