= Abbey of Saint-Symphorien, Metz =

Abbey in Metz, France

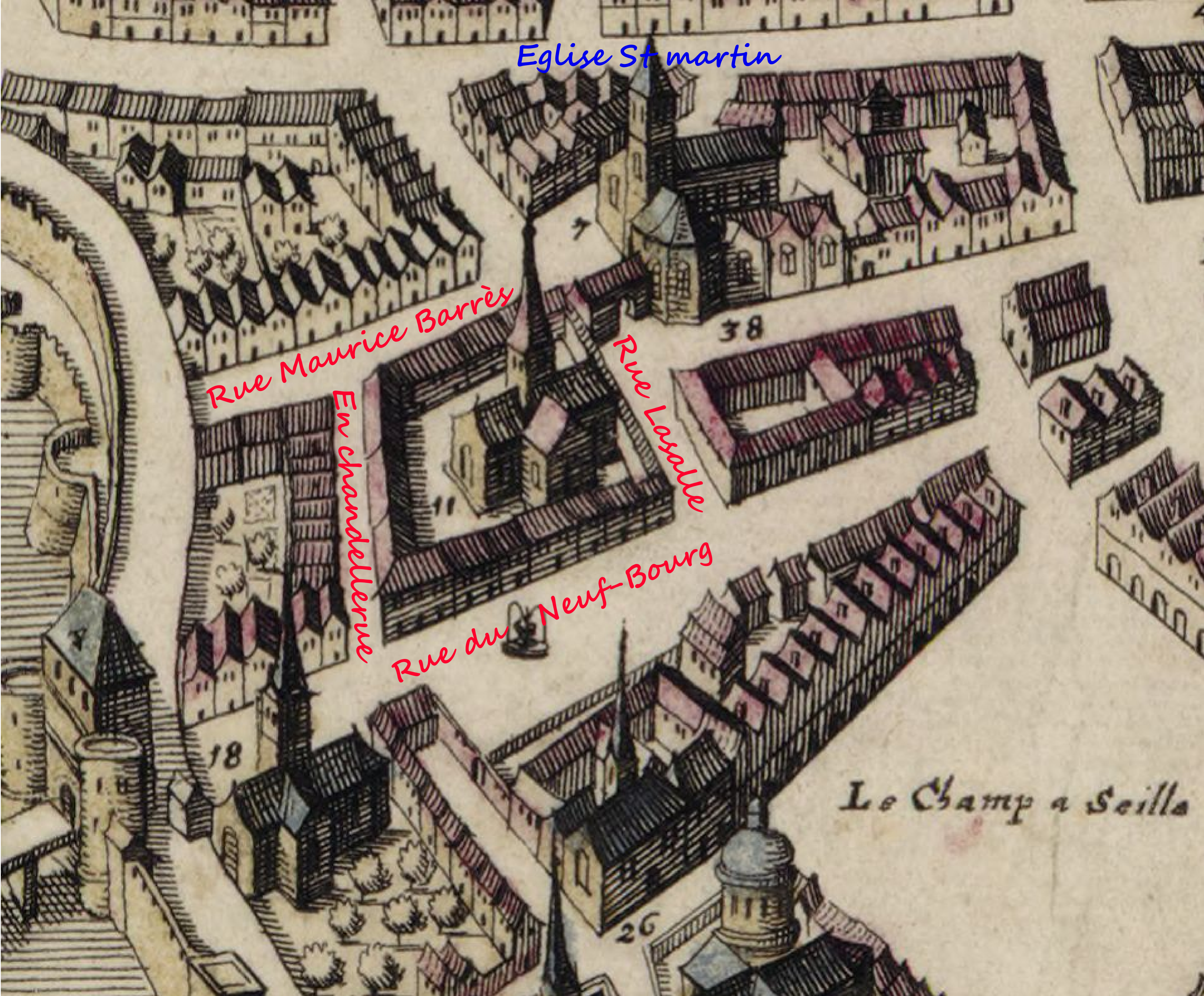
- Artist's view of St Symphorian's Abbey in Metz, from a map by Matthäus Merian, published in 1638

- Location within Grand Est

Religion
- Affiliation: Benedictine
- District: Metz
- Province: Moselle
- Region: Grand Est

Location
- Country: France
- Coordinates: 49°6′49.87″N 6°10′38.31″E

The Abbey of Saint-Symphorien or St Symphorian's Abbey is a former Benedictine monastery founded by Saint Papoul, bishop of Metz, in 609. It was the first Benedictine abbey for men built in Austrasia.

== Saint Symphorian ==
Saint Symphorian (French: Symphorien) was famous in the ancient Gallican liturgy. The transfer of some of his relics to Reims in 801 probably revived his cult in Metz.

== Relics ==
Saint Chrodegang's relics were transferred from Gorze Abbey to the abbey of Saint-Symphorien when Gorze fell into disuse in the 14th century.

In the 10th century, Bishop Theuderic I of Metz donated the relics of Saint Goëri from Saint-Symphorien to the newly built monastery at Épinal.

== History of the abbey ==
The abbey stood outside the city's fortifications near the Porte Serpenoise, on what is now the Avenue Lattre de Tassigny and the Barbot barracks.

Bishop Adalbero II (984–1005) re-established it after it was destroyed by the barbarians under the name of Saint-Symphorien, and appointed monks and an abbot.

On 12 September 1444, the armies of King René, Charles d'Anjou, Artus de Richemont, Constable of France, and Pierre de Brézé, Seneschal of Poitou, laid siege to Metz with 10,000 men. The magistrate of Metz, fearing that the abbey, close to the Serpenoise gate, would be an obstacle to the city's defense, had it burnt down in 1444. The abbey's abbot, Poince de Champel, and his monks retired to a large house known as the Cour (or Maaison) de Morimont, which belonged to Morimond Abbey.

The foundation stone of the new abbey church was laid on 10 May 1481 on the site of the maison de Morimont, which stood where the citadel moats were later built, at the corner of the present-day Palais de Justice.

The abbey was again destroyed and finally re-established in 1564, near the church of Saint-Martin, in the house of Baudoche, on both sides of the present-day Rue Maurice Barrès.

The monks used the Moselle backwater as a fish reserve and the meadows on the island of Saint-Symphorien as pastureland. An 18th-century document mentions that the central part of the island was owned by the abbey, the governor of the citadel owned the meadow facing the île du Saulcy, and Mme de Courcelles owned the land bordering Montigny-lès-Metz.

After the French Revolution, the abbey disappeared and its possessions were dispersed.

On the Monday before Ascension Day, for Rogations, a procession began at Saint-Symphorien, passed through the churches on the left bank of the Moselle and returned to the cathedral via the church of Saint-Vincent.

Since 1960, there has been a new church dedicated to Saint Symphorian in Longeville-lès-Metz, in the middle of the île Saint-Symphorien.

== Possessions ==
- monastery of La Madeleine, in central Metz, abandoned in 1768.
- Vaux
- Angomont and the ban-le-moine (near Badonviller) bordering the abbey of Saint-Sauveur (Croix-Bagué boundary marker).

== Bibliography ==
- Voltz, Eugène. "La dernière abbaye de Saint-Symphorien (1564-1768)". Mémoires de l'Académie nationale de Metz 1963-1964. pp. 139–169.
