= Pommérieux =

- Commune
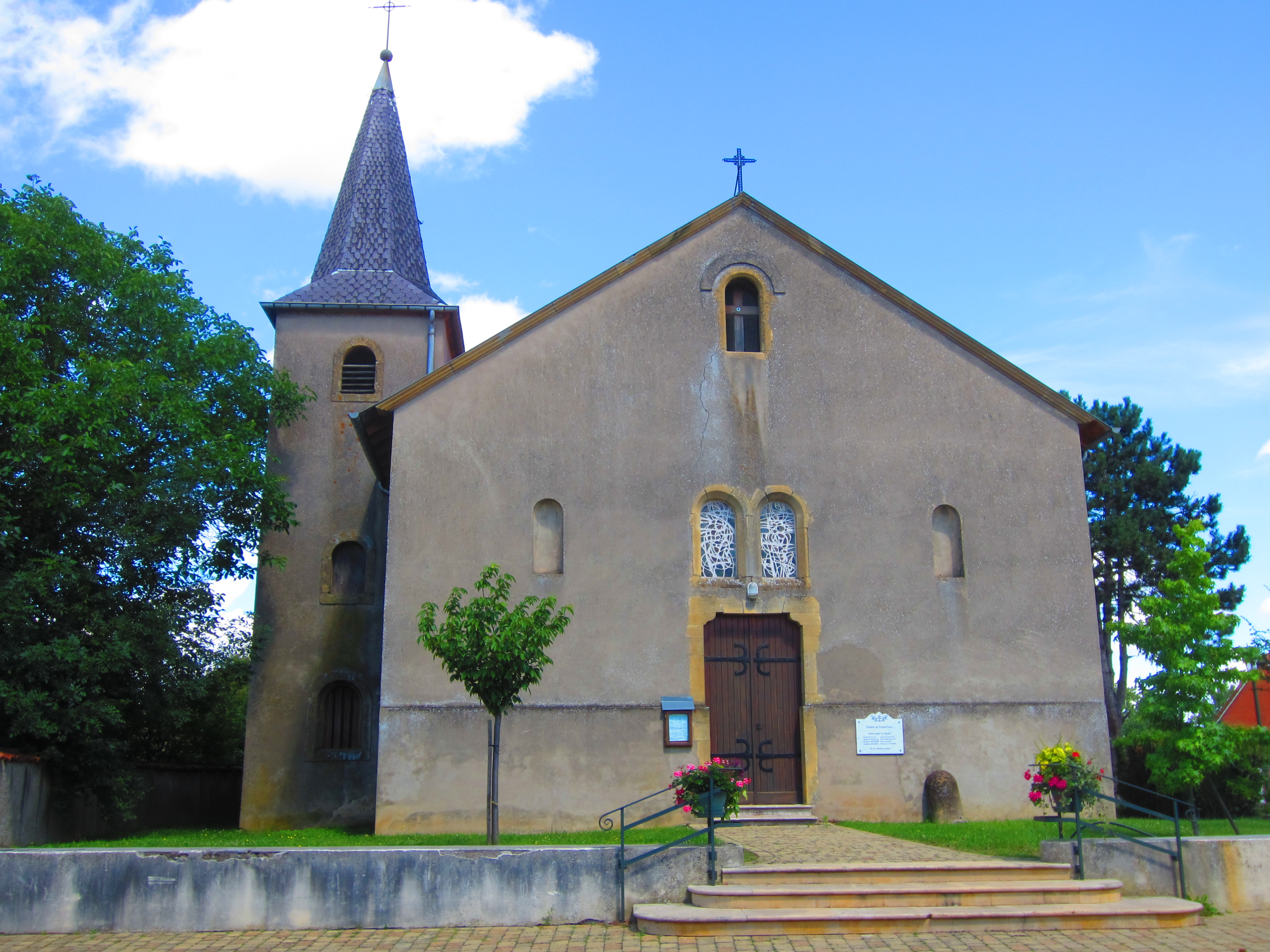
- The church in Pommérieux

- Coat of arms
- Location of Pommérieux
- Location within France Location within Grand Est
- Coordinates: 48°59′49″N 6°10′25″E
- Country: France
- Region: Grand Est
- Department: Moselle
- Arrondissement: Metz
- Canton: Faulquemont
- Intercommunality: Sud Messin

Government
  - Mayor (2020–2026): Raphaël Elin
- Area^{1}: 4.31 km^{2} (1.66 sq mi)
- Elevation: 180 m (590 ft)
- Highest elevation: 213 m (699 ft)
- Lowest elevation: 171 m (561 ft)
- Population (2023): 755
  - Density: 175/km^{2} (454/sq mi)
- Time zone: UTC+01:00 (CET)
  - Summer (DST): UTC+02:00 (CEST)
- INSEE/Postal code: 57547 /57420
- ^{1} French Land Register data, which excludes lakes, ponds, glaciers > 1 km^{2} (0.386 sq mi or 247 acres) and river estuaries.

Pommérieux (French pronunciation: [pɔmeʁjø]; German: Pommeringen) is a commune in the Moselle department in Grand Est in north-eastern France.

== See also ==
- Communes of the Moselle department
