= Vernéville =

- Commune
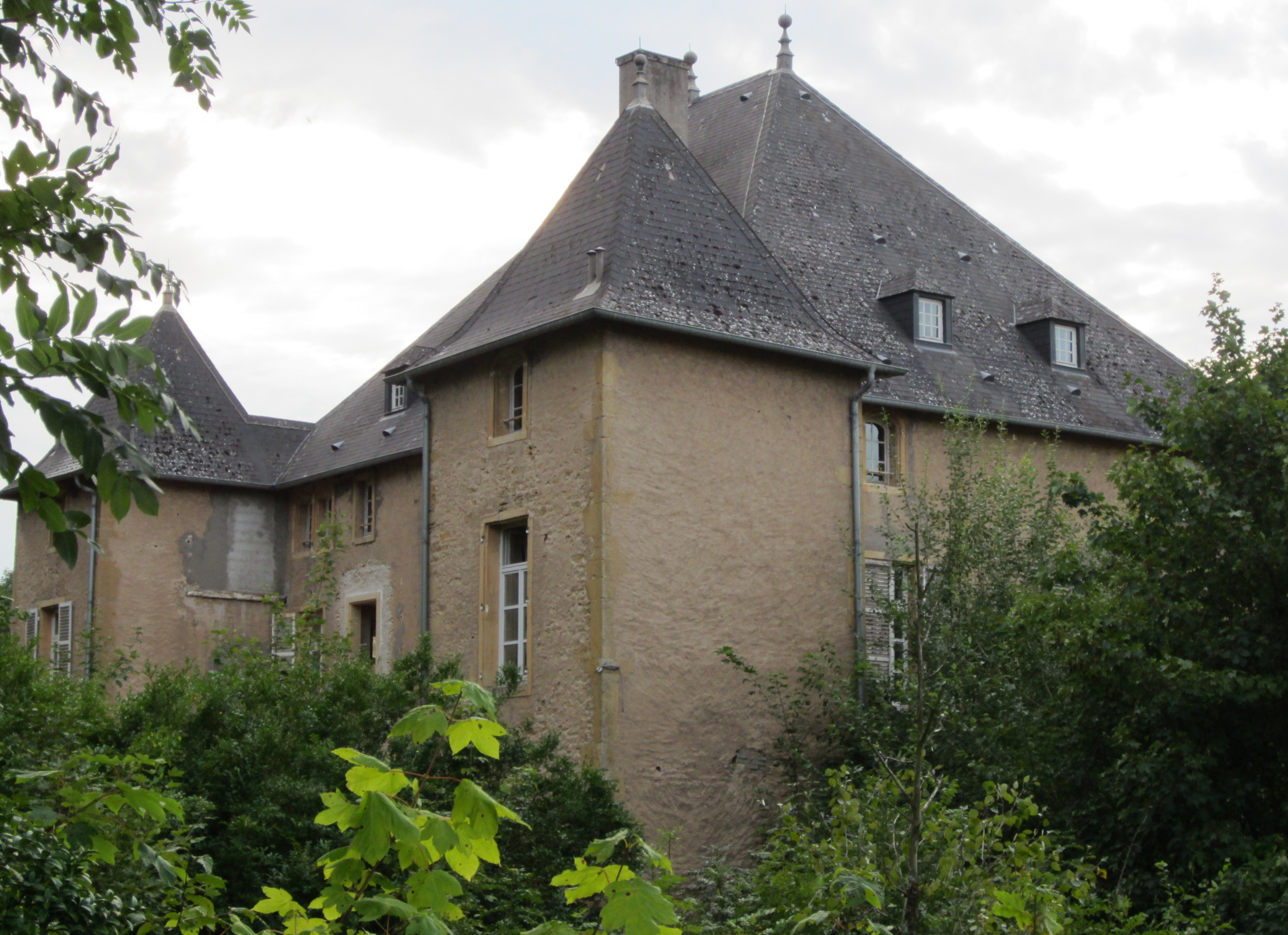
- The chateau in Vernéville

- Coat of arms
- Location of Vernéville
- Location within France Location within Grand Est
- Coordinates: 49°08′50″N 6°00′12″E
- Country: France
- Region: Grand Est
- Department: Moselle
- Arrondissement: Metz
- Canton: Les Coteaux de Moselle
- Intercommunality: Metz Métropole

Government
  - Mayor (2021–2026): Yves Dieudonne
- Area^{1}: 9.18 km^{2} (3.54 sq mi)
- Elevation: 320 m (1,050 ft)
- Highest elevation: 322 m (1,056 ft)
- Lowest elevation: 278 m (912 ft)
- Population (2023): 715
  - Density: 77.9/km^{2} (202/sq mi)
- Time zone: UTC+01:00 (CET)
  - Summer (DST): UTC+02:00 (CEST)
- INSEE/Postal code: 57707 /57130
- ^{1} French Land Register data, which excludes lakes, ponds, glaciers > 1 km^{2} (0.386 sq mi or 247 acres) and river estuaries.

Vernéville (French pronunciation: [vɛʁnevil]; German: Wernheim) is a commune in the Moselle department in Grand Est in north-eastern France.

== See also ==
- Communes of the Moselle department
