= Châtel-Saint-Germain =

- Commune
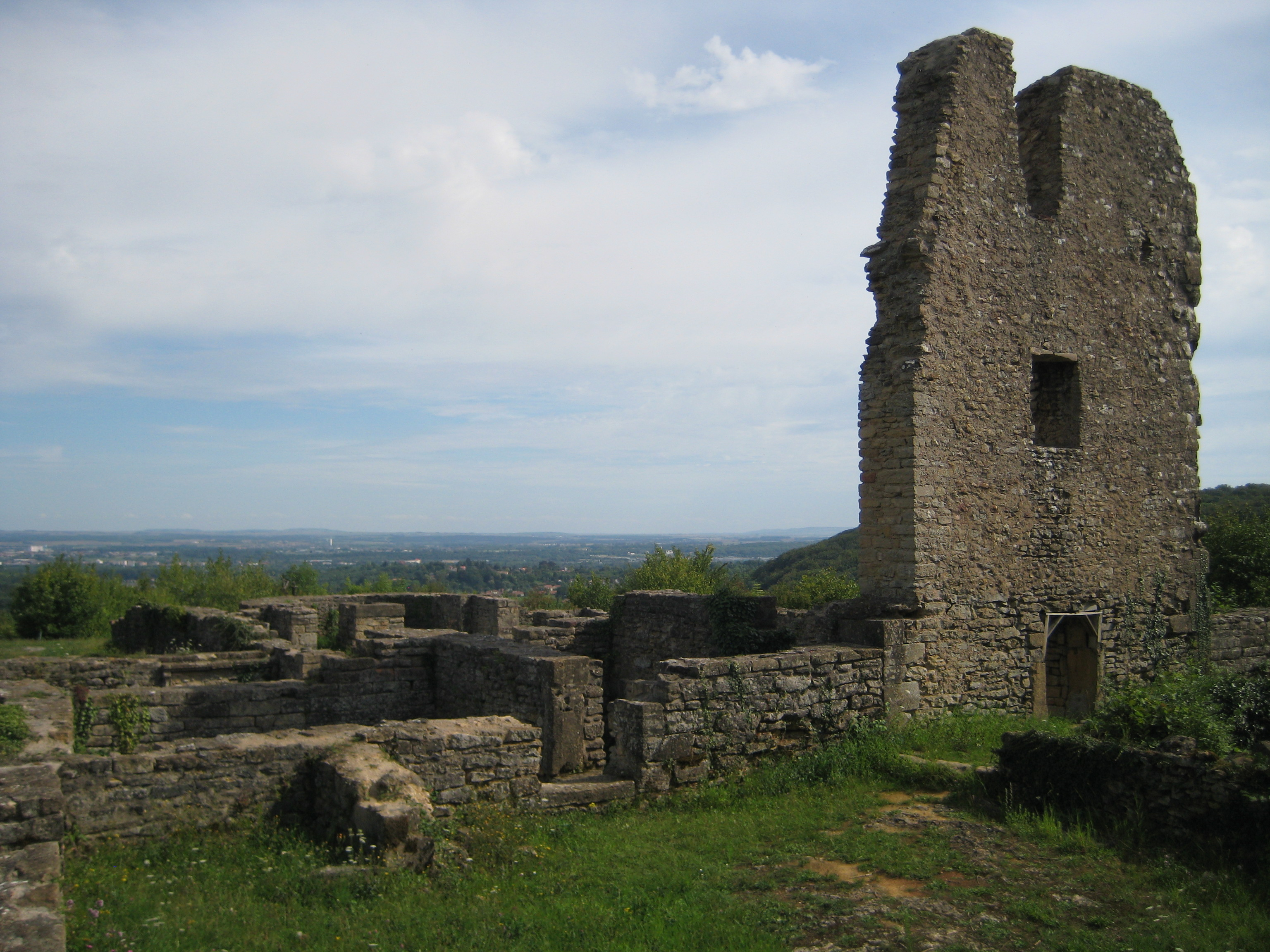
- The remains of the priory in Châtel-Saint-Germain

- Coat of arms
- Location of Châtel-Saint-Germain
- Location within France Location within Grand Est
- Coordinates: 49°07′28″N 6°04′49″E
- Country: France
- Region: Grand Est
- Department: Moselle
- Arrondissement: Metz
- Canton: Les Coteaux de Moselle
- Intercommunality: Metz Métropole

Government
  - Mayor (2020–2026): Claire Ancel
- Area^{1}: 12.88 km^{2} (4.97 sq mi)
- Elevation: 200 m (660 ft)
- Highest elevation: 355 m (1,165 ft)
- Lowest elevation: 176 m (577 ft)
- Population (2023): 1,880
  - Density: 146/km^{2} (378/sq mi)
- Time zone: UTC+01:00 (CET)
  - Summer (DST): UTC+02:00 (CEST)
- INSEE/Postal code: 57134 /57160
- ^{1} French Land Register data, which excludes lakes, ponds, glaciers > 1 km^{2} (0.386 sq mi or 247 acres) and river estuaries.

Châtel-Saint-Germain (French: [ʃɑtɛl sɛ̃ ʒɛʁmɛ̃]; German: Sankt German, (1941-1944) Germannsburg) is a commune in the Moselle department in Grand Est in north-eastern France.

It is situated at the foot of Mount Saint-Germain, which was formerly a strategic location overlooking the Paris-Metz road. The area has been occupied since the Neolithic period.

== See also ==
- Communes of the Moselle department
