= Lorry-lès-Metz =

- Commune
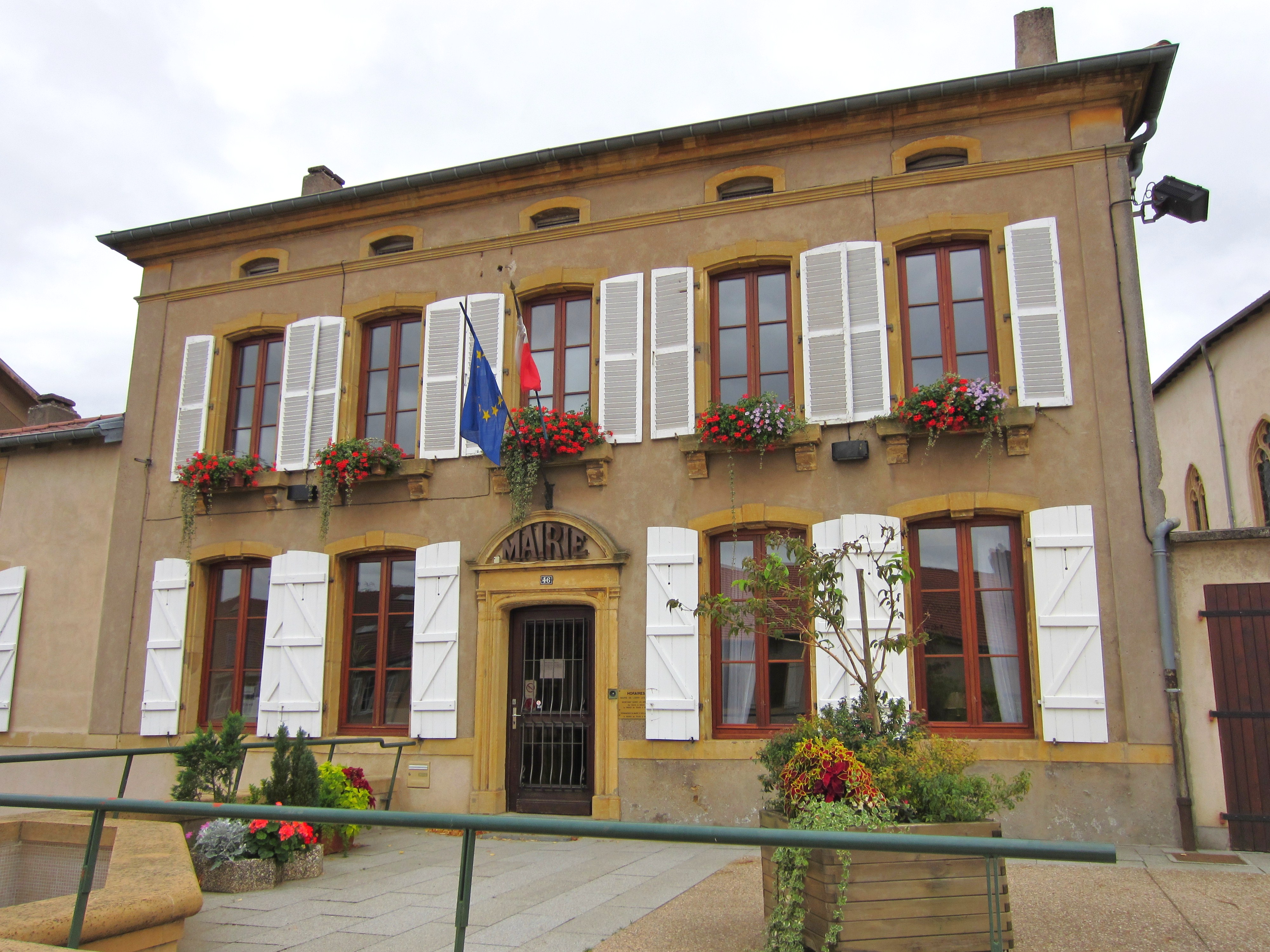
- The town hall in Lorry-lès-Metz

- Coat of arms
- Location of Lorry-lès-Metz
- Location within France Location within Grand Est
- Coordinates: 49°08′33″N 6°07′20″E
- Country: France
- Region: Grand Est
- Department: Moselle
- Arrondissement: Metz
- Canton: Les Coteaux de Moselle
- Intercommunality: Metz Métropole

Government
  - Mayor (2020–2026): Philippe Gleser
- Area^{1}: 6.09 km^{2} (2.35 sq mi)
- Elevation: 240 m (790 ft)
- Highest elevation: 357 m (1,171 ft)
- Lowest elevation: 189 m (620 ft)
- Population (2023): 1,720
  - Density: 282/km^{2} (731/sq mi)
- Time zone: UTC+01:00 (CET)
  - Summer (DST): UTC+02:00 (CEST)
- INSEE/Postal code: 57415 /57050
- ^{1} French Land Register data, which excludes lakes, ponds, glaciers > 1 km^{2} (0.386 sq mi or 247 acres) and river estuaries.

Lorry-lès-Metz (French pronunciation: [lɔʁi lɛ mɛs], literally Lorry near Metz; German: Lorringen) is a commune in the Moselle department in Grand Est in north-eastern France.

== See also ==
- Communes of the Moselle department
