= Liéhon =

- Commune
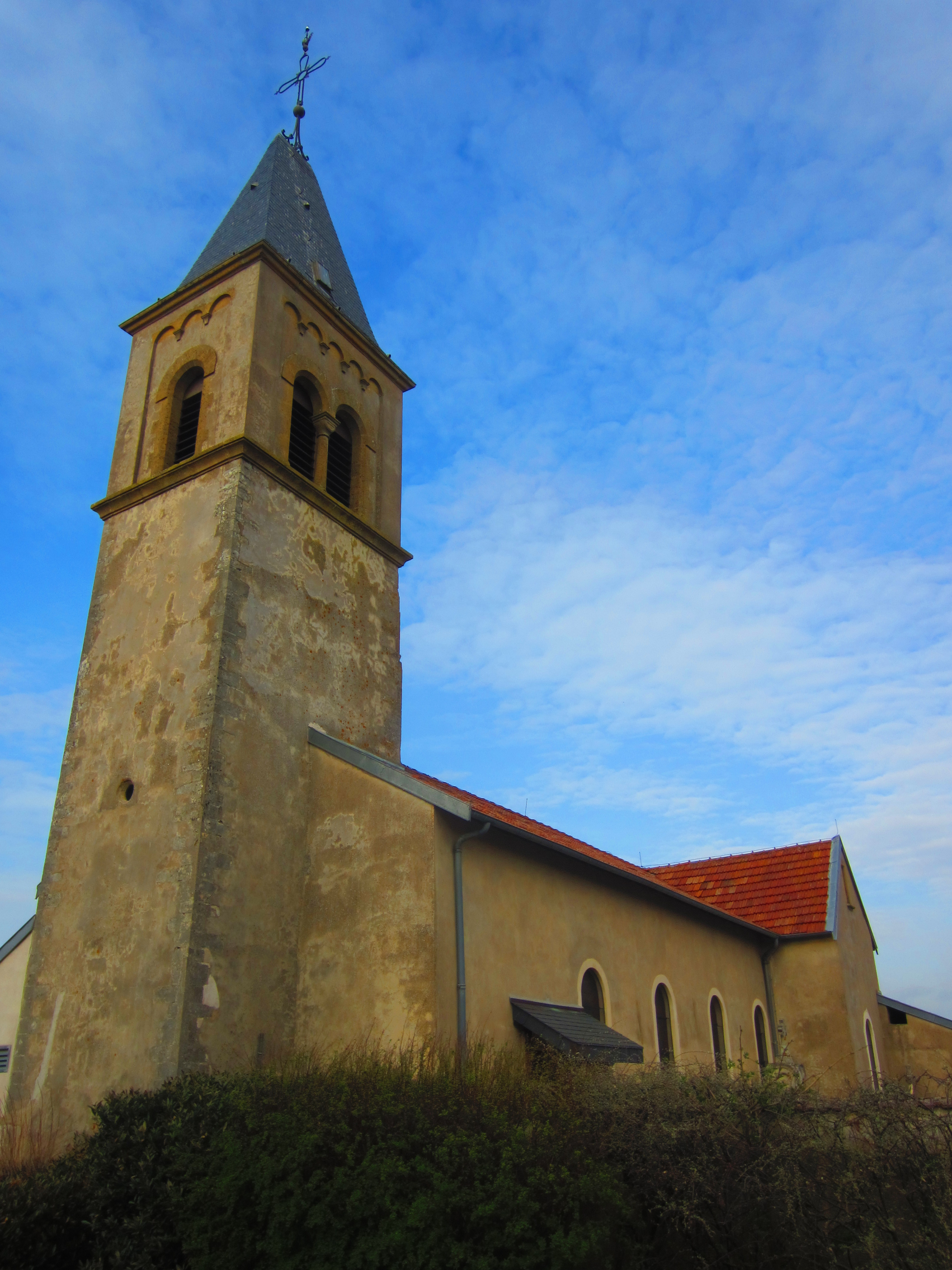
- The church in Liéhon

- Coat of arms
- Location of Liéhon
- Location within France Location within Grand Est
- Coordinates: 49°00′02″N 6°15′31″E
- Country: France
- Region: Grand Est
- Department: Moselle
- Arrondissement: Metz
- Canton: Faulquemont
- Intercommunality: Sud Messin

Government
  - Mayor (2020–2026): Patrick Clause
- Area^{1}: 5.38 km^{2} (2.08 sq mi)
- Elevation: 260 m (850 ft)
- Highest elevation: 291 m (955 ft)
- Lowest elevation: 214 m (702 ft)
- Population (2023): 130
  - Density: 24/km^{2} (63/sq mi)
- Time zone: UTC+01:00 (CET)
  - Summer (DST): UTC+02:00 (CEST)
- INSEE/Postal code: 57403 /57420
- ^{1} French Land Register data, which excludes lakes, ponds, glaciers > 1 km^{2} (0.386 sq mi or 247 acres) and river estuaries.

Liéhon (French pronunciation: [lje.ɔ̃]; German: Lieheim) is a commune in the Moselle department in Grand Est in north-eastern France.

== See also ==
- Communes of the Moselle department
