= Arry, Moselle =

Arry
- Commune
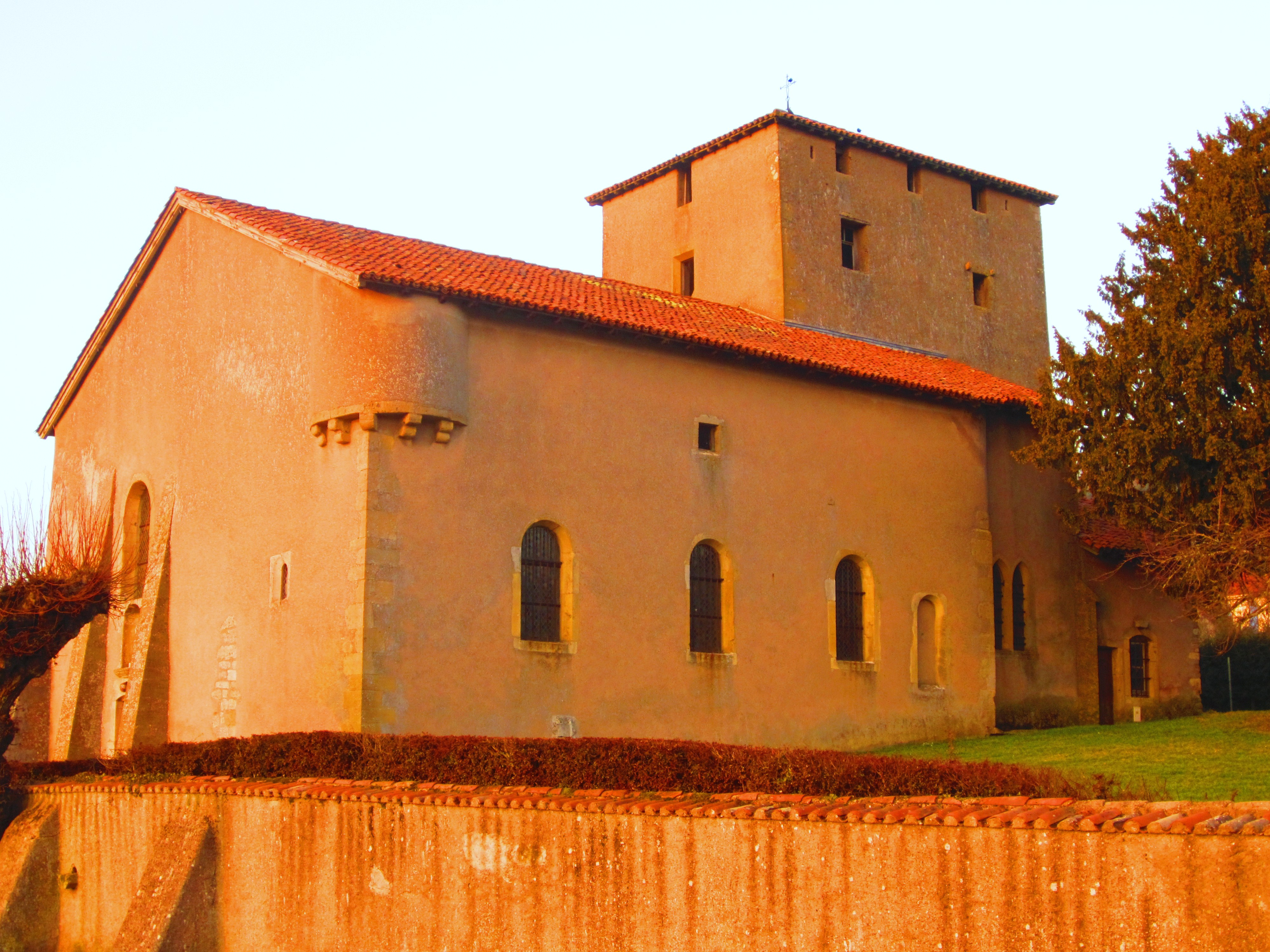
- The church in Arry

- Coat of arms
- Location of Arry
- Location within France Location within Grand Est
- Coordinates: 48°59′42″N 6°03′30″E
- Country: France
- Region: Grand Est
- Department: Moselle
- Arrondissement: Metz
- Canton: Les Coteaux de Moselle
- Intercommunality: CC Mad Moselle

Government
  - Mayor (2020–2026): Philippe Varnier
- Area^{1}: 6.88 km^{2} (2.66 sq mi)
- Elevation: 285 m (935 ft)
- Highest elevation: 386 m (1,266 ft)
- Lowest elevation: 170 m (560 ft)
- Population (2023): 517
  - Density: 75.1/km^{2} (195/sq mi)
- Time zone: UTC+01:00 (CET)
  - Summer (DST): UTC+02:00 (CEST)
- INSEE/Postal code: 57030 /57680
- ^{1} French Land Register data, which excludes lakes, ponds, glaciers > 1 km^{2} (0.386 sq mi or 247 acres) and river estuaries.

Arry (French pronunciation: [aʁi]) is a commune in the Moselle department in Grand Est in northeastern France.

== Population ==
Historical population
Year	Pop.	±% p.a.
1968	324	—
1975	304	−0.91%
1982	358	+2.36%
1990	350	−0.28%
1999	407	+1.69%
2007	463	+1.62%
2012	541	+3.16%
2017	554	+0.48%
2023	517	−1.15%
Source: INSEE

== See also ==
- Communes of the Moselle department
