= Pouilly, Moselle =

Pouilly
- Commune
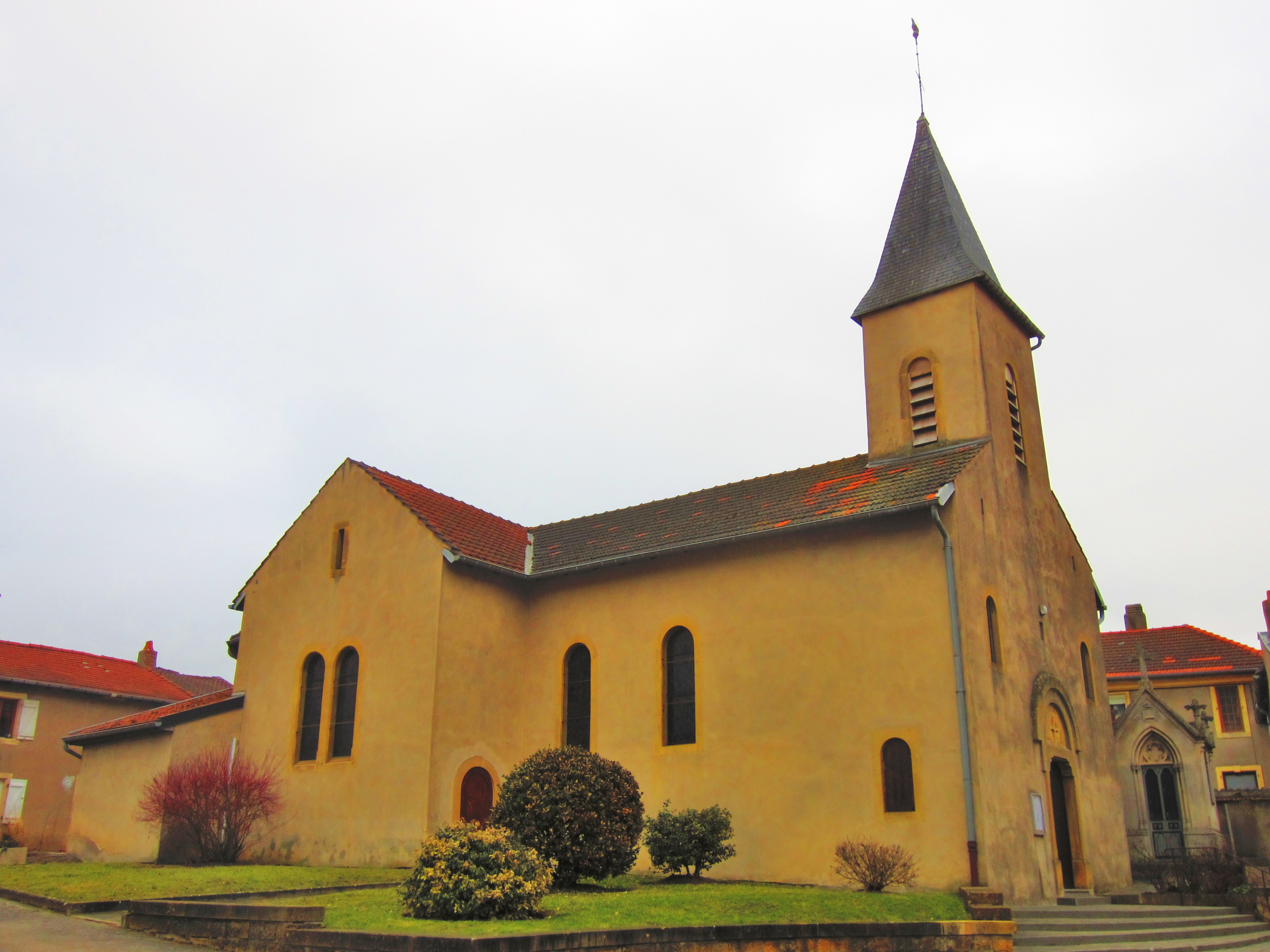
- The church in Pouilly

- Coat of arms
- Location of Pouilly
- Location within France Location within Grand Est
- Coordinates: 49°03′04″N 6°11′12″E
- Country: France
- Region: Grand Est
- Department: Moselle
- Arrondissement: Metz
- Canton: Les Coteaux de Moselle
- Intercommunality: Metz Métropole

Government
  - Mayor (2020–2026): Marilyne Webert
- Area^{1}: 5.11 km^{2} (1.97 sq mi)
- Elevation: 200 m (660 ft)
- Highest elevation: 223 m (732 ft)
- Lowest elevation: 169 m (554 ft)
- Population (2023): 963
  - Density: 188/km^{2} (488/sq mi)
- Time zone: UTC+01:00 (CET)
  - Summer (DST): UTC+02:00 (CEST)
- INSEE/Postal code: 57552 /57420
- ^{1} French Land Register data, which excludes lakes, ponds, glaciers > 1 km^{2} (0.386 sq mi or 247 acres) and river estuaries.

Pouilly (French pronunciation: [puji]; German: Pullingen) is a commune in the Moselle department in Grand Est in north-eastern France.

== See also ==
- Communes of the Moselle department
