= Lessy =

- Commune
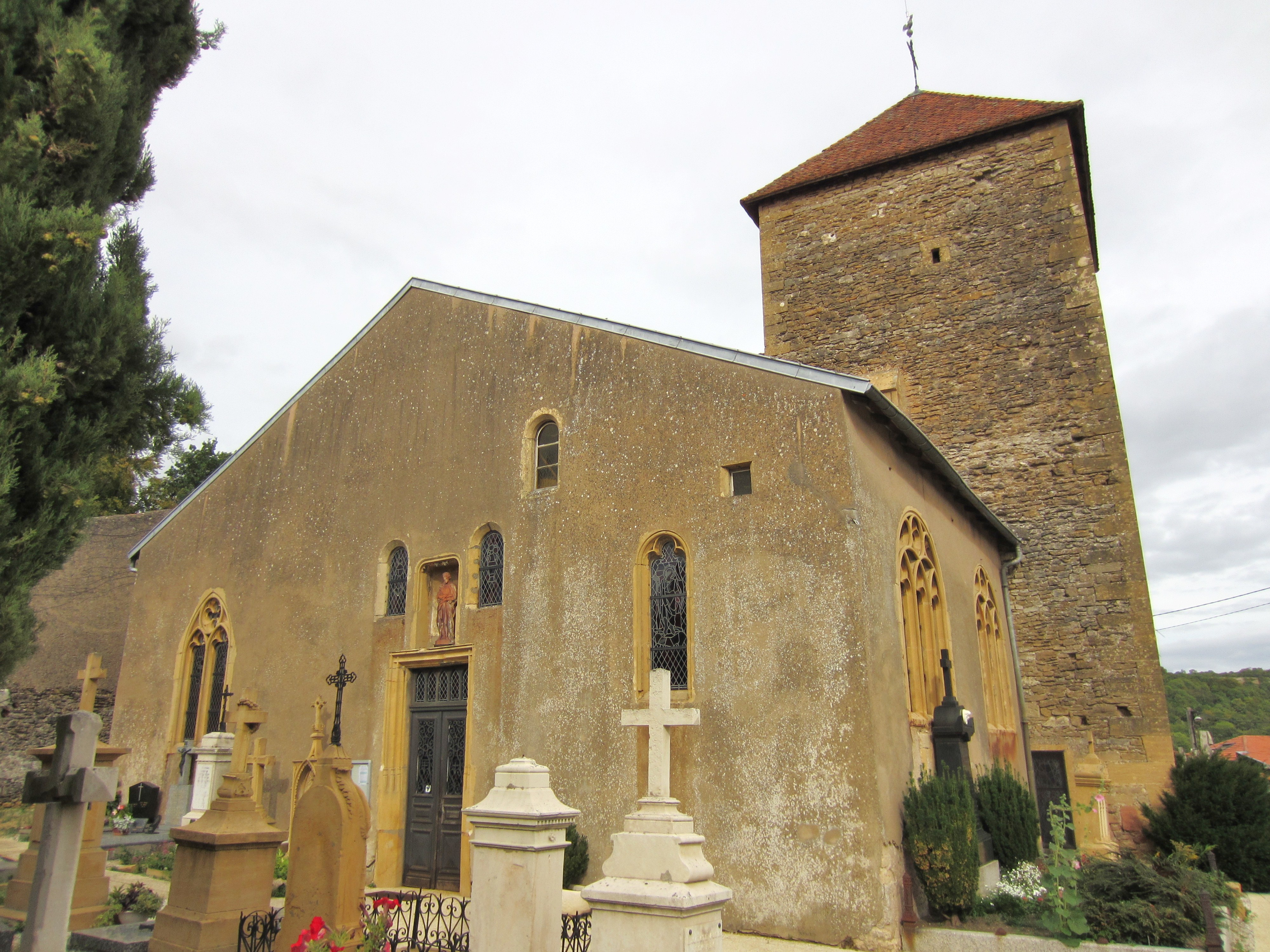
- The church in Lessy

- Coat of arms
- Location of Lessy
- Location within France Location within Grand Est
- Coordinates: 49°07′13″N 6°05′47″E
- Country: France
- Region: Grand Est
- Department: Moselle
- Arrondissement: Metz
- Canton: Les Coteaux de Moselle
- Intercommunality: Metz Métropole

Government
  - Mayor (2025–2026): Jocelyne Bastien
- Area^{1}: 2.85 km^{2} (1.10 sq mi)
- Elevation: 249 m (817 ft)
- Highest elevation: 344 m (1,129 ft)
- Lowest elevation: 183 m (600 ft)
- Population (2023): 794
  - Density: 279/km^{2} (722/sq mi)
- Time zone: UTC+01:00 (CET)
  - Summer (DST): UTC+02:00 (CEST)
- INSEE/Postal code: 57396 /57160
- ^{1} French Land Register data, which excludes lakes, ponds, glaciers > 1 km^{2} (0.386 sq mi or 247 acres) and river estuaries.

Lessy (French pronunciation: [lesi]; German: Lessingen) is a commune in the Moselle department in Grand Est in north-eastern France.

== See also ==
- Communes of the Moselle department
