= Augny =

- Commune
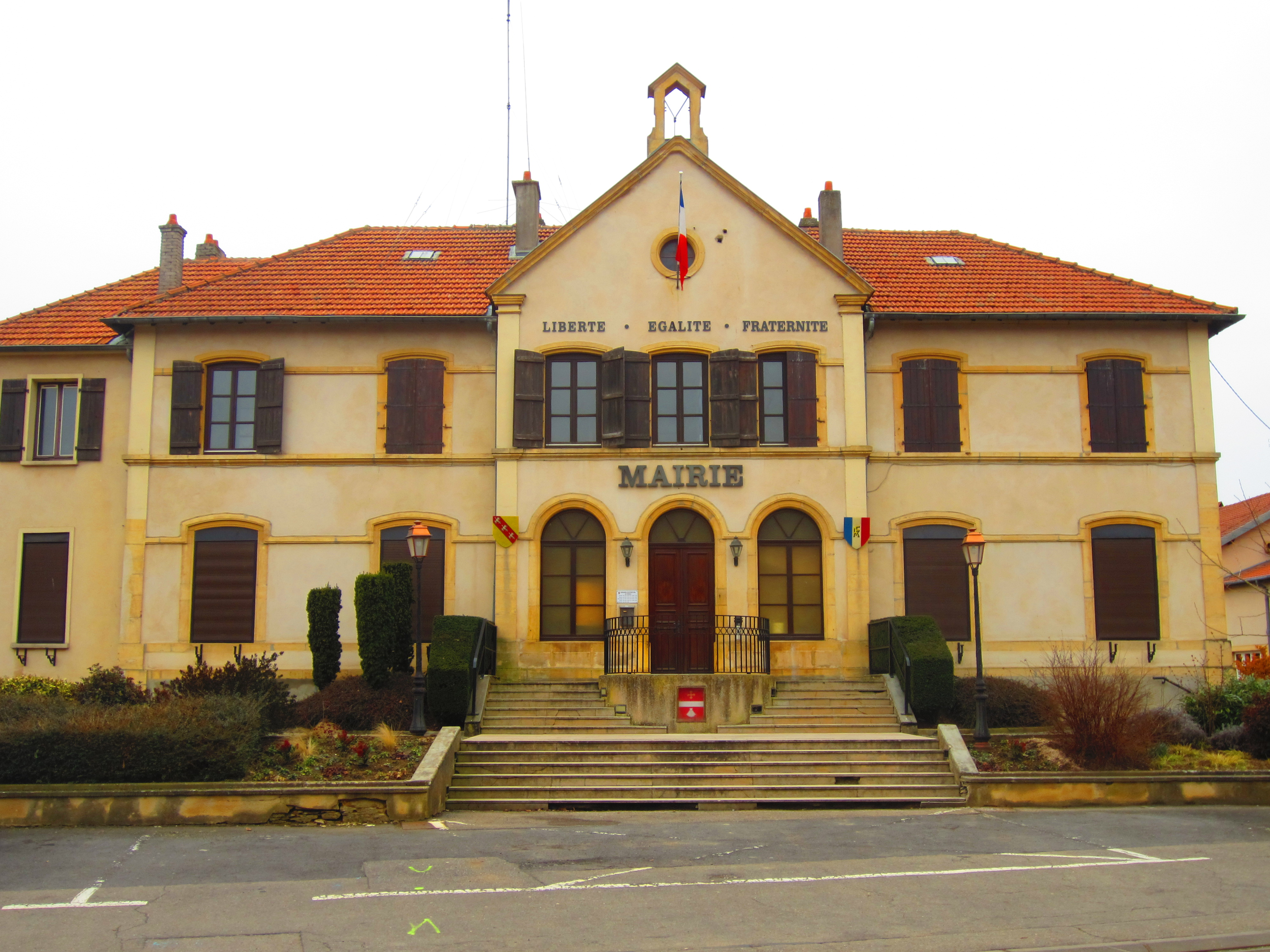
- The town hall in Augny

- Coat of arms
- Location of Augny
- Location within France Location within Grand Est
- Coordinates: 49°03′34″N 6°07′19″E
- Country: France
- Region: Grand Est
- Department: Moselle
- Arrondissement: Metz
- Canton: Les Coteaux de Moselle
- Intercommunality: Metz Métropole

Government
  - Mayor (2020–2026): François Henrion
- Area^{1}: 14.98 km^{2} (5.78 sq mi)
- Elevation: 475 m (1,558 ft)
- Highest elevation: 361 m (1,184 ft)
- Lowest elevation: 165 m (541 ft)
- Population (2023): 2,207
  - Density: 147.3/km^{2} (381.6/sq mi)
- Time zone: UTC+01:00 (CET)
  - Summer (DST): UTC+02:00 (CEST)
- INSEE/Postal code: 57039 /57685
- ^{1} French Land Register data, which excludes lakes, ponds, glaciers > 1 km^{2} (0.386 sq mi or 247 acres) and river estuaries.

Augny (French pronunciation: [oɲi]; German: Auning) is a commune in the Moselle department in Grand Est in northeastern France.

== Population ==
Historical population
Year	Pop.	±% p.a.
1968	1,148	—
1975	1,390	+2.77%
1982	1,503	+1.12%
1990	1,576	+0.59%
1999	1,738	+1.09%
2007	2,403	+4.13%
2012	2,172	−2.00%
2017	1,996	−1.68%
2023	2,207	+1.69%
Source: INSEE

== See also ==
- Communes of the Moselle department
