= Féy, Moselle =

Féy
- Commune
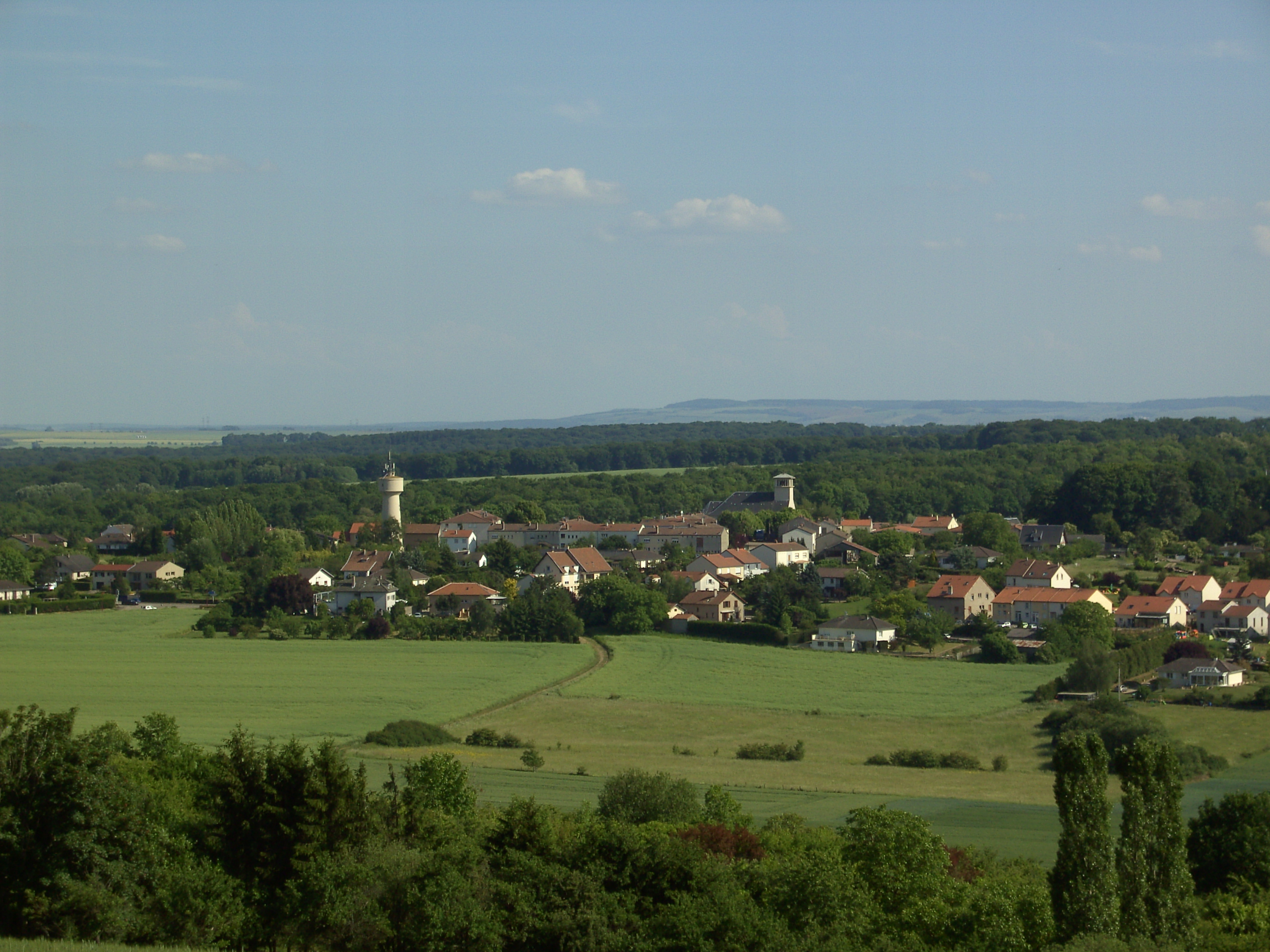
- A general view of Féy

- Coat of arms
- Location of Féy
- Location within France Location within Grand Est
- Coordinates: 49°01′50″N 6°05′52″E
- Country: France
- Region: Grand Est
- Department: Moselle
- Arrondissement: Metz
- Canton: Les Coteaux de Moselle
- Intercommunality: Metz Métropole
- Area^{1}: 5.66 km^{2} (2.19 sq mi)
- Elevation: 215 m (705 ft)
- Highest elevation: 361 m (1,184 ft)
- Lowest elevation: 191 m (627 ft)
- Population (2023): 754
  - Density: 133/km^{2} (345/sq mi)
- Time zone: UTC+01:00 (CET)
  - Summer (DST): UTC+02:00 (CEST)
- INSEE/Postal code: 57212 /57420
- ^{1} French Land Register data, which excludes lakes, ponds, glaciers > 1 km^{2} (0.386 sq mi or 247 acres) and river estuaries.

Féy (French pronunciation: [fei]; German: Buch in Lothringen) is a commune in the Moselle department in Grand Est in north-eastern France.

It lies to the south of Metz.

== History ==
Historically, the village possessed a church (église Saint-Pierre) built in 1859 which was destroyed in 1944 during the Second World War. It has been replaced with a newer church built in a more modern style.

== See also ==
- Communes of the Moselle department
