= Rozérieulles =

- Commune
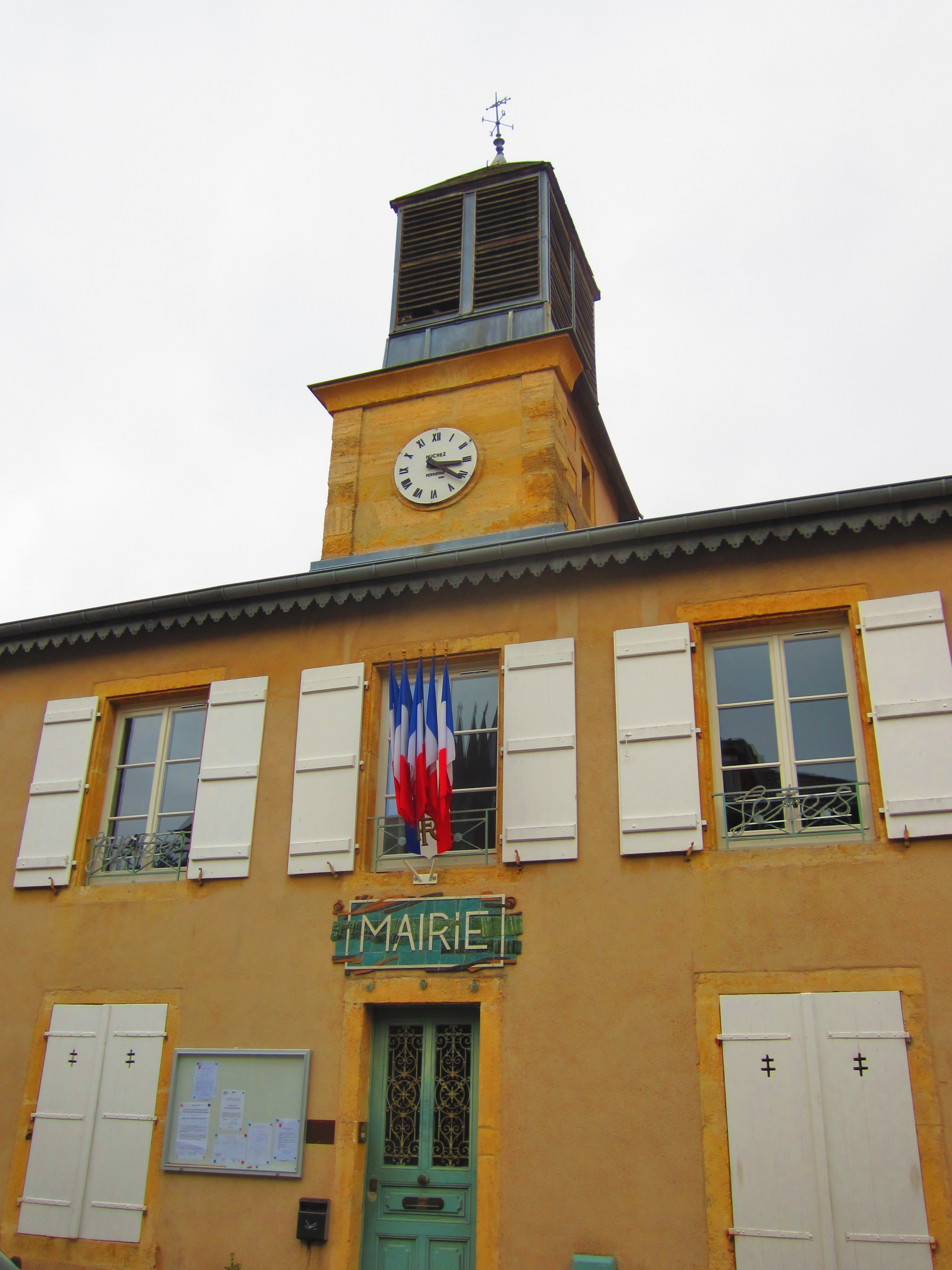
- The town hall in Rozérieulles

- Coat of arms
- Location of Rozérieulles
- Location within France Location within Grand Est
- Coordinates: 49°06′26″N 6°04′58″E
- Country: France
- Region: Grand Est
- Department: Moselle
- Arrondissement: Metz
- Canton: Les Coteaux de Moselle
- Intercommunality: Metz Métropole

Government
  - Mayor (2020–2026): Roger Peultier
- Area^{1}: 6.58 km^{2} (2.54 sq mi)
- Elevation: 234 m (768 ft)
- Highest elevation: 342 m (1,122 ft)
- Lowest elevation: 184 m (604 ft)
- Population (2023): 1,334
  - Density: 203/km^{2} (525/sq mi)
- Time zone: UTC+01:00 (CET)
  - Summer (DST): UTC+02:00 (CEST)
- INSEE/Postal code: 57601 /57160
- ^{1} French Land Register data, which excludes lakes, ponds, glaciers > 1 km^{2} (0.386 sq mi or 247 acres) and river estuaries.

Rozérieulles (French pronunciation: [ʁozeʁjœl]; German: Roseringen) is a commune in the Moselle department in Grand Est in north-eastern France.

== See also ==
- Communes of the Moselle department
