= Sainte-Ruffine =

- Commune
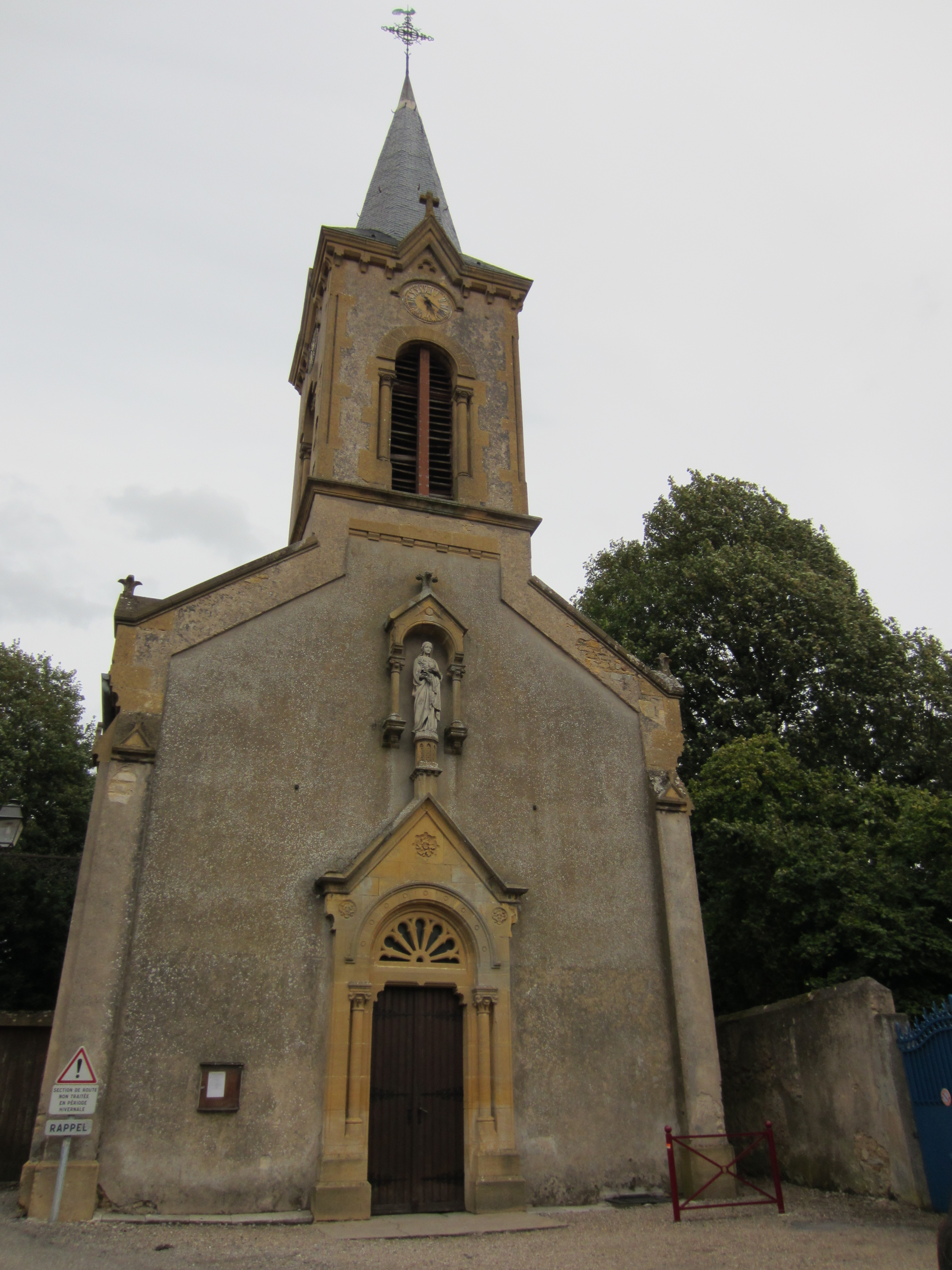
- The church in Sainte-Ruffine

- Coat of arms
- Location of Sainte-Ruffine
- Location within France Location within Grand Est
- Coordinates: 49°06′21″N 6°05′47″E
- Country: France
- Region: Grand Est
- Department: Moselle
- Arrondissement: Metz
- Canton: Les Coteaux de Moselle
- Intercommunality: Metz Métropole

Government
  - Mayor (2020–2026): Daniel Baudouin
- Area^{1}: 0.7 km^{2} (0.27 sq mi)
- Elevation: 230 m (750 ft)
- Highest elevation: 226 m (741 ft)
- Lowest elevation: 166 m (545 ft)
- Population (2023): 623
  - Density: 890/km^{2} (2,300/sq mi)
- Time zone: UTC+01:00 (CET)
  - Summer (DST): UTC+02:00 (CEST)
- INSEE/Postal code: 57624 /57130
- ^{1} French Land Register data, which excludes lakes, ponds, glaciers > 1 km^{2} (0.386 sq mi or 247 acres) and river estuaries.

Sainte-Ruffine (French pronunciation: [sɛ̃t ʁyfin]; German: Sankt Ruffin, (1940–1944) Ruffingen) is a commune in the Moselle department in Grand Est in north-eastern France.

== See also ==
- Communes of the Moselle department
