= Pournoy-la-Chétive =

- Commune
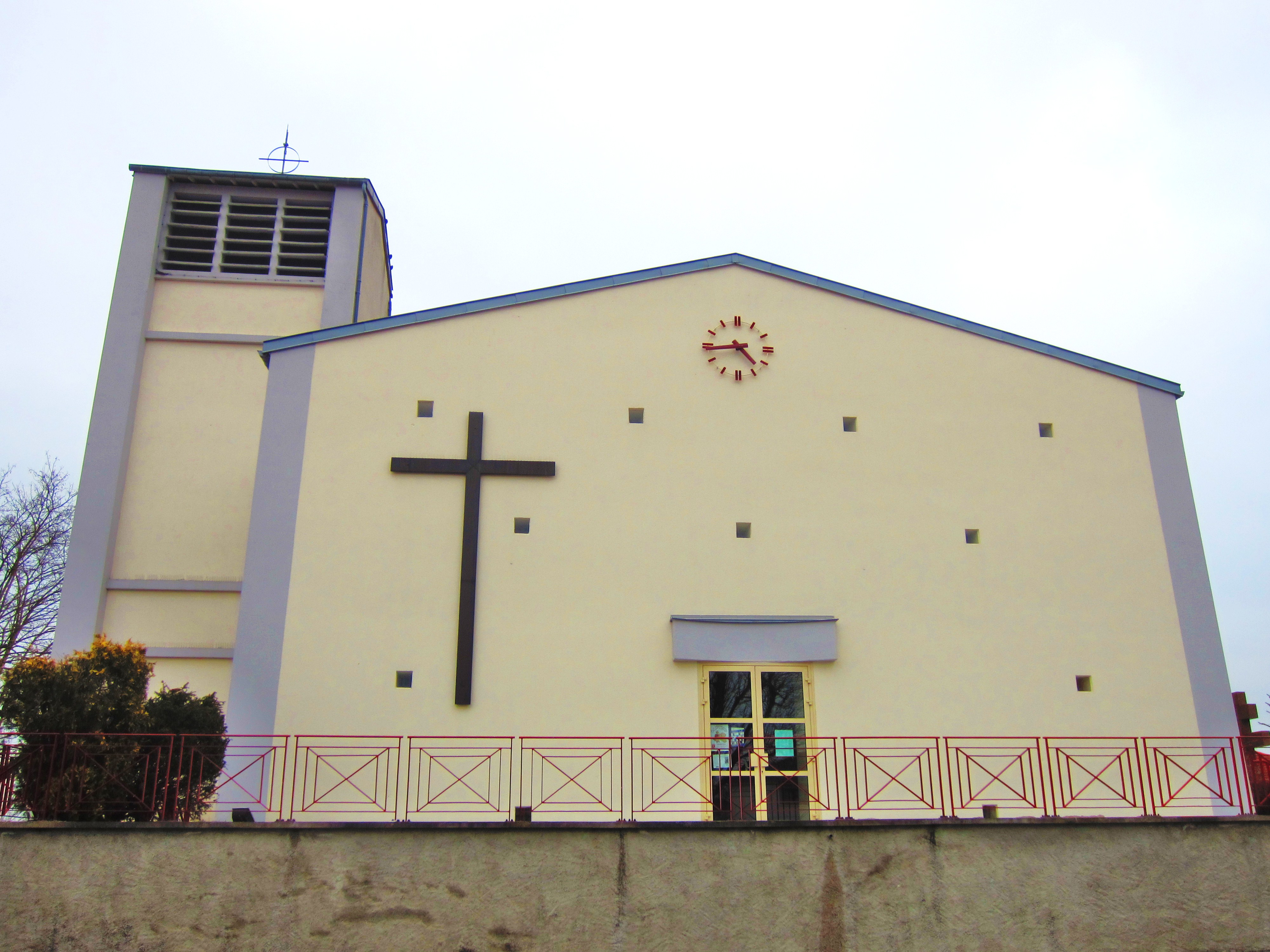
- The church in Pournoy-la-Chétive

- Coat of arms
- Location of Pournoy-la-Chétive
- Location within France Location within Grand Est
- Coordinates: 49°01′14″N 6°09′23″E
- Country: France
- Region: Grand Est
- Department: Moselle
- Arrondissement: Metz
- Canton: Les Coteaux de Moselle
- Intercommunality: Metz Métropole

Government
  - Mayor (2020–2026): Martine Michel
- Area^{1}: 2.56 km^{2} (0.99 sq mi)
- Elevation: 190 m (620 ft)
- Highest elevation: 197 m (646 ft)
- Lowest elevation: 171 m (561 ft)
- Population (2023): 610
  - Density: 240/km^{2} (620/sq mi)
- Time zone: UTC+01:00 (CET)
  - Summer (DST): UTC+02:00 (CEST)
- INSEE/Postal code: 57553 /57420
- ^{1} French Land Register data, which excludes lakes, ponds, glaciers > 1 km^{2} (0.386 sq mi or 247 acres) and river estuaries.

Pournoy-la-Chétive (French pronunciation: [puʁnwa la ʃetiv]; German: Kleinprunach) is a commune in the Moselle department in Grand Est in north-eastern France.

== See also ==
- Communes of the Moselle department
