= Novéant-sur-Moselle =

- Commune
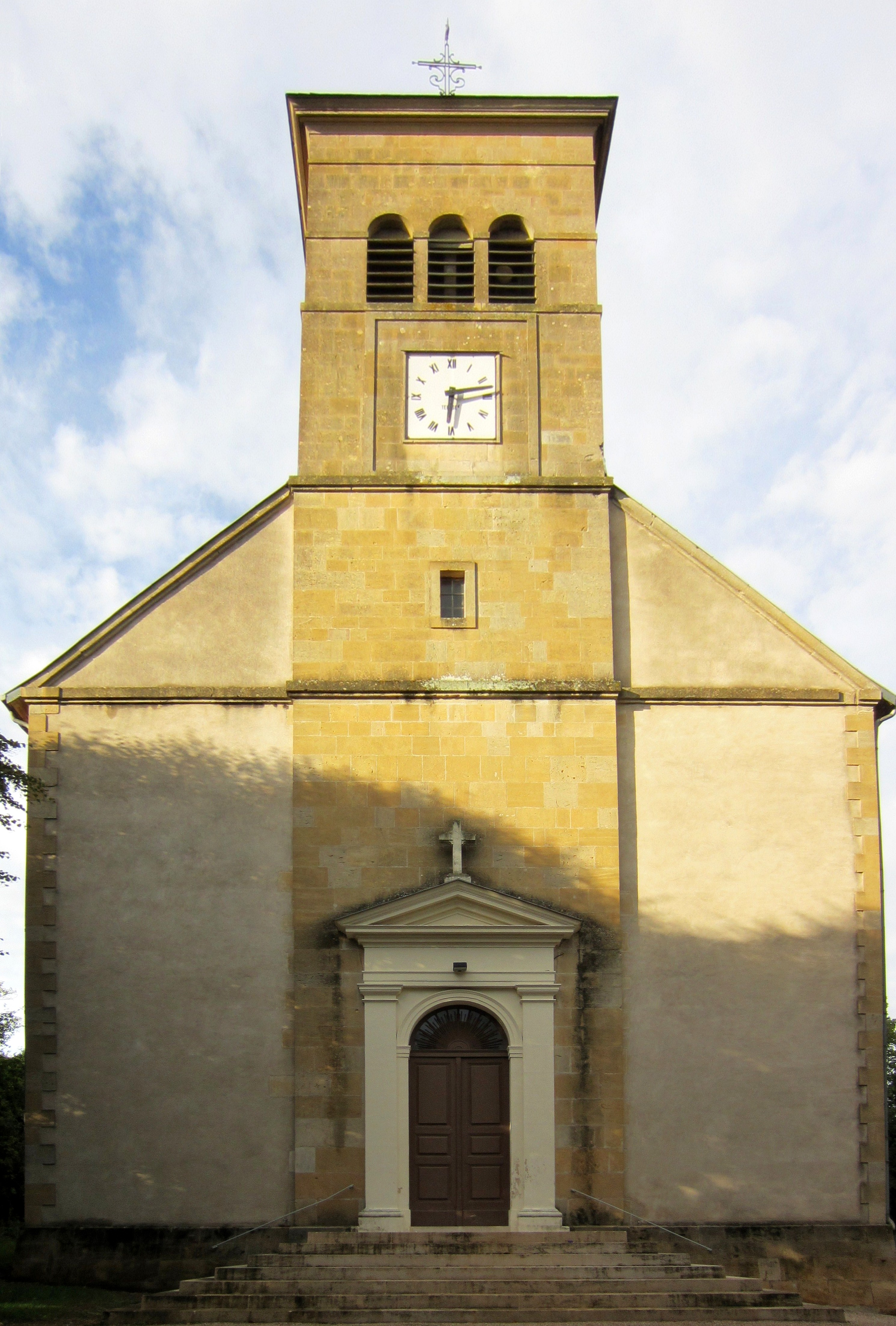
- The church in Novéant-sur-Moselle

- Coat of arms
- Location of Novéant-sur-Moselle
- Location within France Location within Grand Est
- Coordinates: 49°01′20″N 6°02′50″E
- Country: France
- Region: Grand Est
- Department: Moselle
- Arrondissement: Metz
- Canton: Les Coteaux de Moselle
- Intercommunality: Mad et Moselle

Government
  - Mayor (2025–2026): Stéphanie Jacquemot
- Area^{1}: 12.89 km^{2} (4.98 sq mi)
- Elevation: 176 m (577 ft)
- Highest elevation: 371 m (1,217 ft)
- Lowest elevation: 168 m (551 ft)
- Population (2023): 1,844
  - Density: 143.1/km^{2} (370.5/sq mi)
- Time zone: UTC+01:00 (CET)
  - Summer (DST): UTC+02:00 (CEST)
- INSEE/Postal code: 57515 /57680
- ^{1} French Land Register data, which excludes lakes, ponds, glaciers > 1 km^{2} (0.386 sq mi or 247 acres) and river estuaries.

Novéant-sur-Moselle (French pronunciation: [nɔve.ɑ̃ syʁ mɔzɛl]; German: Neuburg in Lothringen, (1940-1944) Neuburg an der Mosel) is a commune in the Moselle department in Grand Est in north-eastern France.

== See also ==
- Communes of the Moselle department
- Parc naturel régional de Lorraine
