= Vaux, Moselle =

Vaux
- Commune
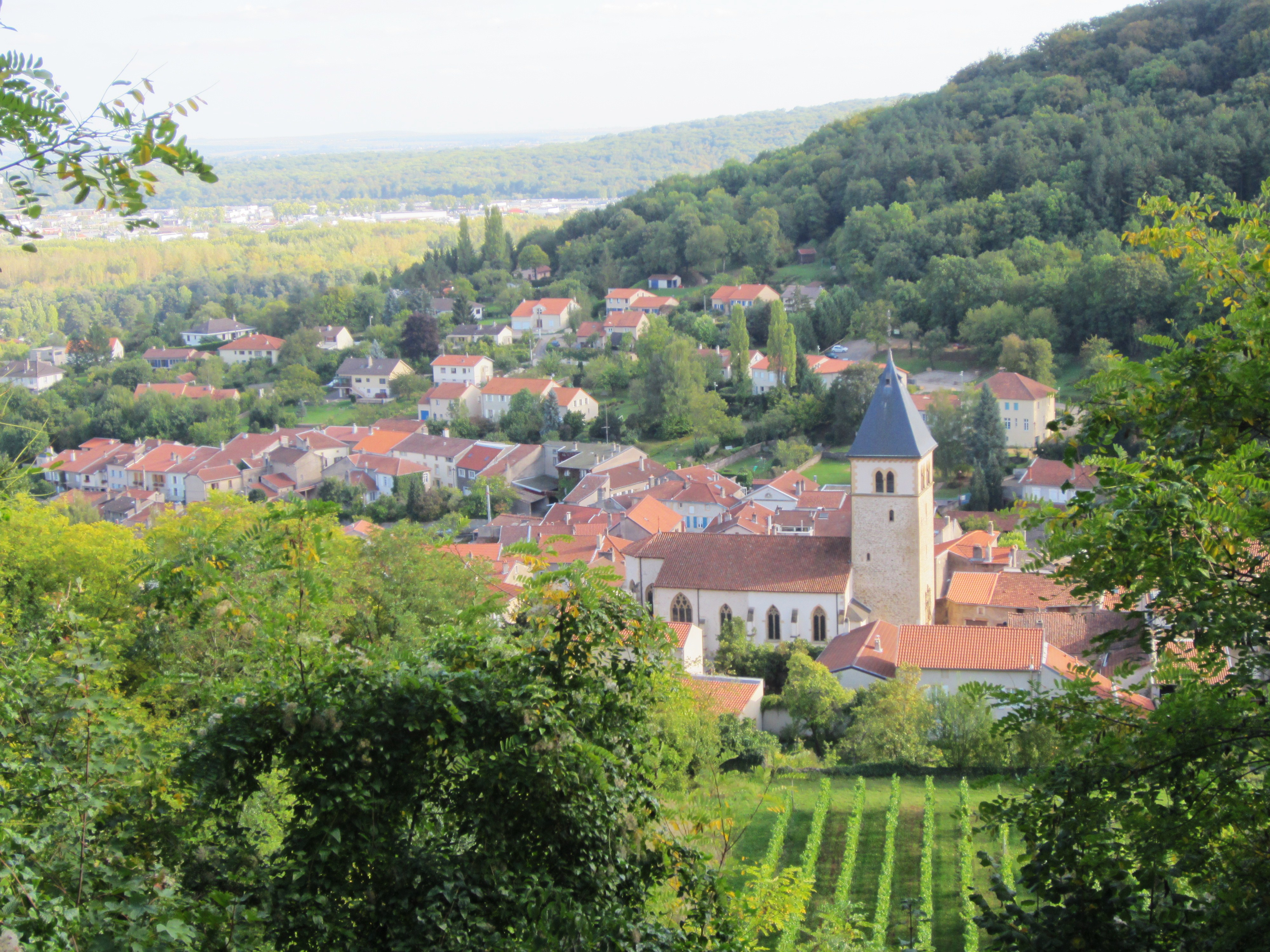
- A general view of Vaux

- Coat of arms
- Location of Vaux
- Location within France Location within Grand Est
- Coordinates: 49°05′39″N 6°04′51″E
- Country: France
- Region: Grand Est
- Department: Moselle
- Arrondissement: Metz
- Canton: Les Coteaux de Moselle
- Intercommunality: Metz Métropole

Government
  - Mayor (2020–2026): Jean Combelles
- Area^{1}: 6.63 km^{2} (2.56 sq mi)
- Elevation: 230 m (750 ft)
- Highest elevation: 353 m (1,158 ft)
- Lowest elevation: 167 m (548 ft)
- Population (2023): 792
  - Density: 119/km^{2} (309/sq mi)
- Time zone: UTC+01:00 (CET)
  - Summer (DST): UTC+02:00 (CEST)
- INSEE/Postal code: 57701 /57130
- ^{1} French Land Register data, which excludes lakes, ponds, glaciers > 1 km^{2} (0.386 sq mi or 247 acres) and river estuaries.

Vaux (French pronunciation: [vo]; German: Wals) is a commune in the Moselle department in Grand Est in north-eastern France.

== See also ==
- Communes of the Moselle department
- Parc naturel régional de Lorraine
- Abbey Saint-Symphorien de Metz
