= Marieulles =

- Commune
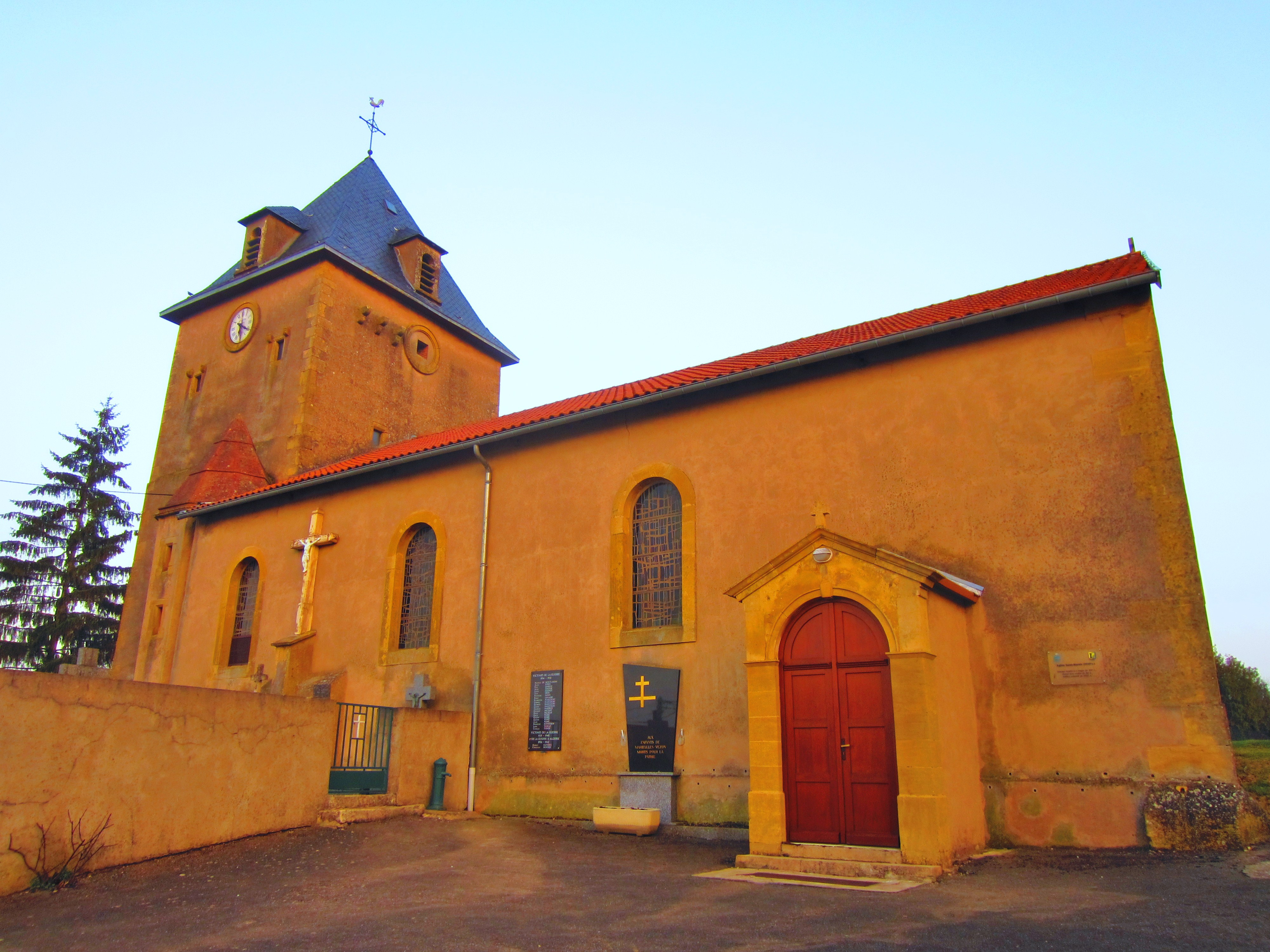
- The church in Marieulles

- Coat of arms
- Location of Marieulles
- Location within France Location within Grand Est
- Coordinates: 48°59′59″N 6°06′03″E
- Country: France
- Region: Grand Est
- Department: Moselle
- Arrondissement: Metz
- Canton: Les Coteaux de Moselle
- Intercommunality: Metz Métropole

Government
  - Mayor (2020–2026): Pierre Muel
- Area^{1}: 8.19 km^{2} (3.16 sq mi)
- Elevation: 250 m (820 ft)
- Highest elevation: 375 m (1,230 ft)
- Lowest elevation: 183 m (600 ft)
- Population (2023): 700
  - Density: 85/km^{2} (220/sq mi)
- Time zone: UTC+01:00 (CET)
  - Summer (DST): UTC+02:00 (CEST)
- INSEE/Postal code: 57445 /57420
- ^{1} French Land Register data, which excludes lakes, ponds, glaciers > 1 km^{2} (0.386 sq mi or 247 acres) and river estuaries.

Marieulles (French pronunciation: [maʁjœl], also: Marieulles-Vezon; German: Mariellen) is a commune in the Moselle department in Grand Est in north-eastern France.

== See also ==
- Communes of the Moselle department
