= Moulins-lès-Metz =

- Commune
- Coat of arms
- Location of Moulins-lès-Metz
- Location within France Location within Grand Est
- Coordinates: 49°06′25″N 6°06′35″E
- Country: France
- Region: Grand Est
- Department: Moselle
- Arrondissement: Metz
- Canton: Les Coteaux de Moselle
- Intercommunality: Metz Métropole

Government
  - Mayor (2020–2026): Jean Bauchez
- Area^{1}: 6.98 km^{2} (2.69 sq mi)
- Elevation: 175 m (574 ft)
- Highest elevation: 196 m (643 ft)
- Lowest elevation: 165 m (541 ft)
- Population (2023): 5,265
  - Density: 754/km^{2} (1,950/sq mi)
- Demonym: Moulinois
- Time zone: UTC+01:00 (CET)
  - Summer (DST): UTC+02:00 (CEST)
- INSEE/Postal code: 57487 /57160
- ^{1} French Land Register data, which excludes lakes, ponds, glaciers > 1 km^{2} (0.386 sq mi or 247 acres) and river estuaries.

Moulins-lès-Metz (French pronunciation: [mulɛ̃ lɛ mɛs], Moulins near Metz; German: Mühlen bei Metz) is a commune in the Moselle department in Grand Est in north-eastern France.

== Population ==
Historical population
Year	Pop.	±% p.a.
1968	4,160	—
1975	5,700	+4.60%
1982	5,034	−1.76%
1990	4,827	−0.52%
1999	4,663	−0.38%
2007	5,040	+0.98%
2012	5,090	+0.20%
2017	5,055	−0.14%
2023	5,265	+0.68%
Source: INSEE

== See also ==
- Communes of the Moselle department
