= Lorry-Mardigny =

- Commune
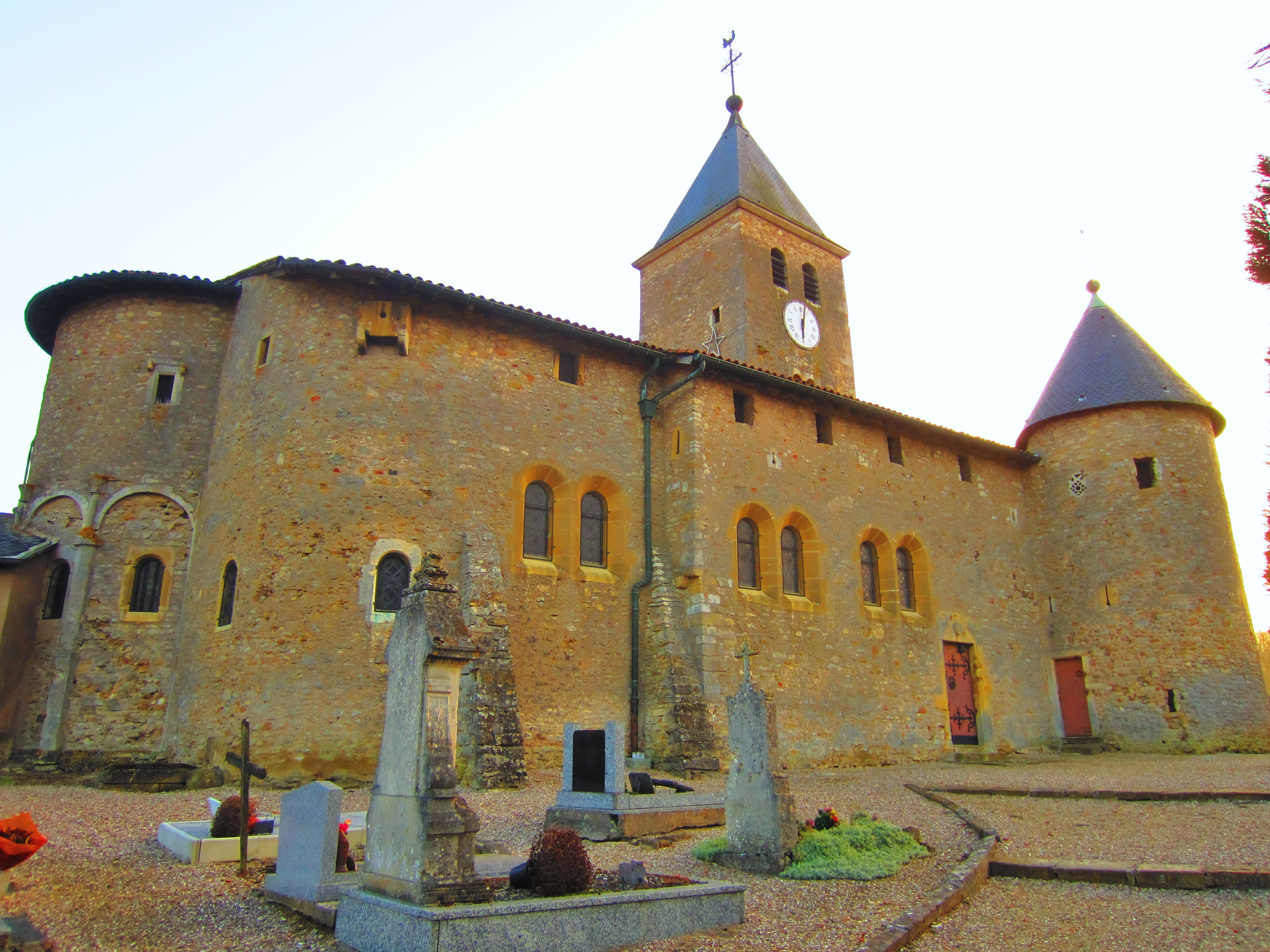
- The church in Lorry-Mardigny

- Coat of arms
- Location of Lorry-Mardigny
- Location within France Location within Grand Est
- Coordinates: 48°59′27″N 6°05′17″E
- Country: France
- Region: Grand Est
- Department: Moselle
- Arrondissement: Metz
- Canton: Les Coteaux de Moselle
- Intercommunality: Mad et Moselle

Government
  - Mayor (2020–2026): Philippe Hardy
- Area^{1}: 11.36 km^{2} (4.39 sq mi)
- Elevation: 260 m (850 ft)
- Highest elevation: 396 m (1,299 ft)
- Lowest elevation: 187 m (614 ft)
- Population (2023): 683
  - Density: 60.1/km^{2} (156/sq mi)
- Time zone: UTC+01:00 (CET)
  - Summer (DST): UTC+02:00 (CEST)
- INSEE/Postal code: 57416 /57420
- ^{1} French Land Register data, which excludes lakes, ponds, glaciers > 1 km^{2} (0.386 sq mi or 247 acres) and river estuaries.

Lorry-Mardigny (French pronunciation: [lɔʁi maʁdiɲi]; German: Lorringen-Mardeningen) is a commune in the Moselle department in Grand Est in north-eastern France.

== See also ==
- Communes of the Moselle department
