= Noisseville =

- Commune
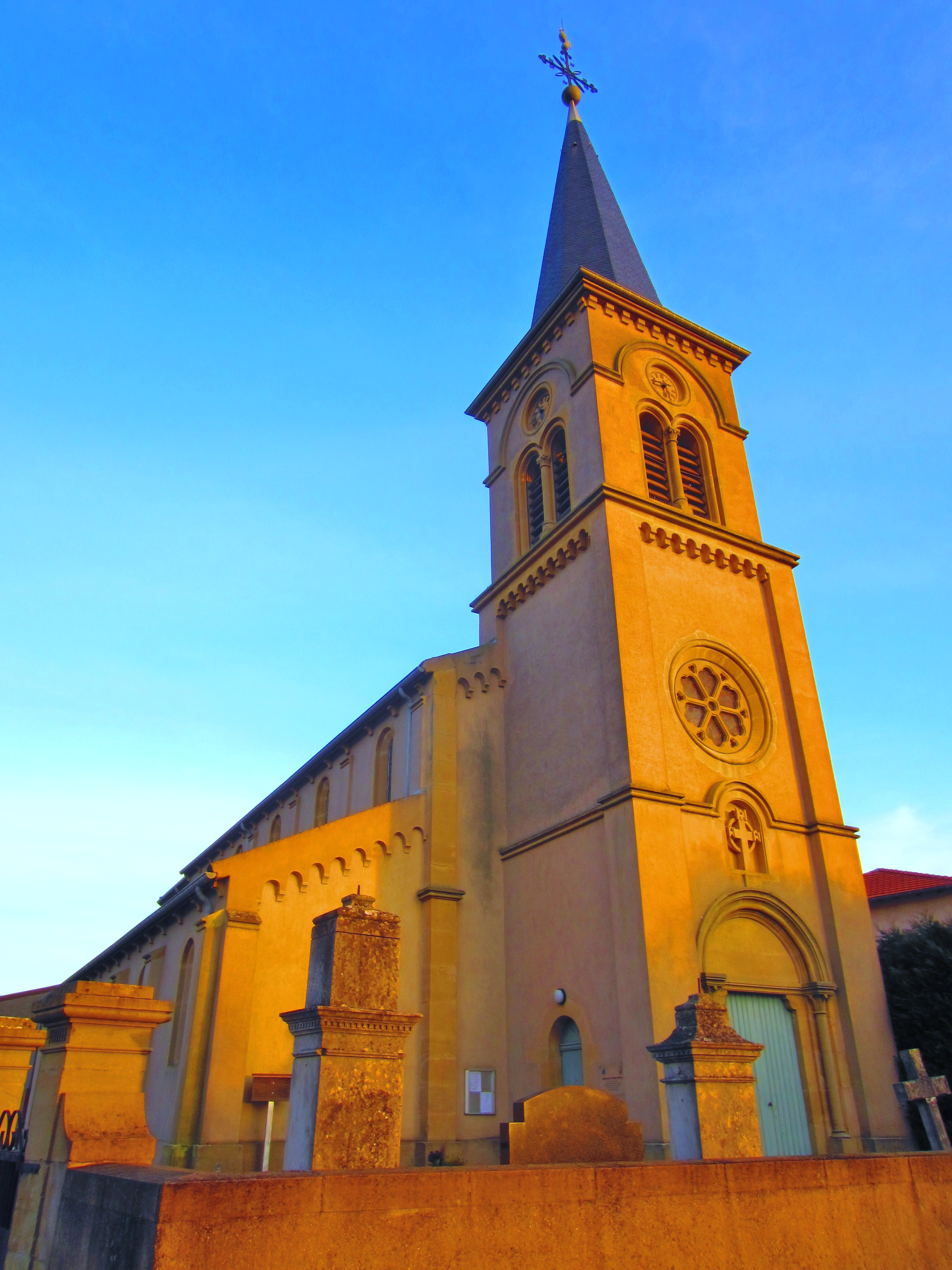
- The church in Noisseville

- Coat of arms
- Location of Noisseville
- Location within France Location within Grand Est
- Coordinates: 49°08′07″N 6°16′28″E
- Country: France
- Region: Grand Est
- Department: Moselle
- Arrondissement: Metz
- Canton: Le Pays Messin
- Intercommunality: Metz Métropole

Government
  - Mayor (2023–2026): Geoffrey Schutz
- Area^{1}: 2.6 km^{2} (1.0 sq mi)
- Elevation: 225 m (738 ft)
- Highest elevation: 254 m (833 ft)
- Lowest elevation: 183 m (600 ft)
- Population (2023): 1,109
  - Density: 430/km^{2} (1,100/sq mi)
- Time zone: UTC+01:00 (CET)
  - Summer (DST): UTC+02:00 (CEST)
- INSEE/Postal code: 57510 /57645
- ^{1} French Land Register data, which excludes lakes, ponds, glaciers > 1 km^{2} (0.386 sq mi or 247 acres) and river estuaries.

Noisseville (French pronunciation: [nwasvil]; German: Neußenheim) is a commune in the Moselle department in Grand Est in north-eastern France.

== History ==
In the 12th century, the commune was known by its name as "Noacivilla". At the same period the Romanesque style church of Saint-Etienne Parish was also built. The parish was under by the Bishopric of Metz until it was passed to the Roman Catholic Diocese of Metz in the 17th century. The area was known for its actual battle of Metz in the series of Franco-Prussian War between the French and Prussian forces in 1870 when the French forces retreated to this area for shelter.

The place is also known for its French memorial against German invasion between 1871 and 1918. And it is also the place of a war memorial for the German troops who died from the battle of Metz in 1870 by a representation of a sleeping lion.

== See also ==
- Communes of the Moselle department
