= Ars-sur-Moselle =

- Commune
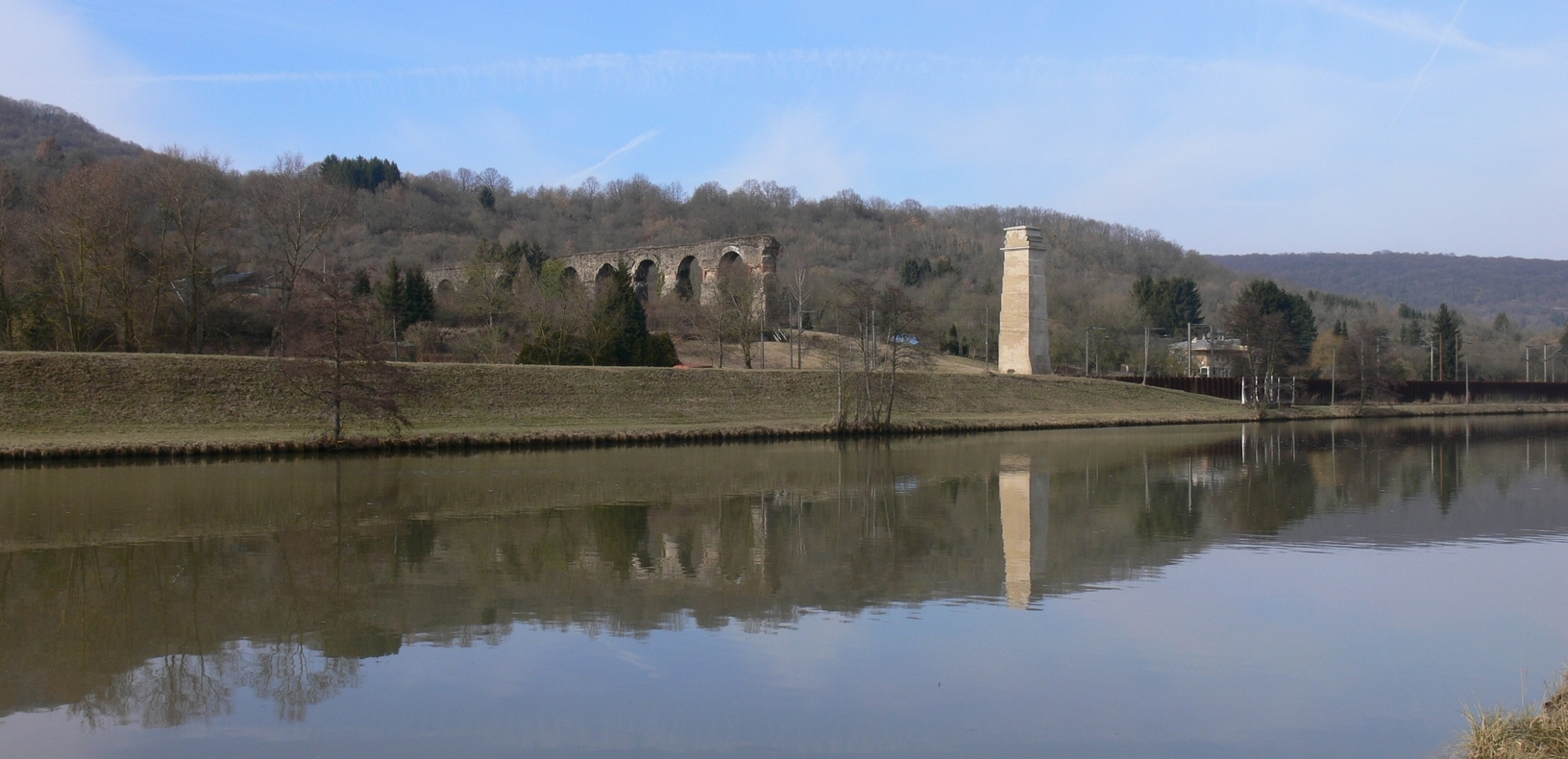
- The river and a section of aqueduct in Ars-sur-Moselle

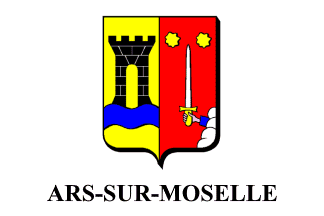
- Flag Coat of arms
- Location of Ars-sur-Moselle
- Location within France Location within Grand Est
- Coordinates: 49°04′44″N 6°04′30″E
- Country: France
- Region: Grand Est
- Department: Moselle
- Arrondissement: Metz
- Canton: Les Coteaux de Moselle
- Intercommunality: Metz Métropole

Government
  - Mayor (2026–32): Laurent Bovi
- Area^{1}: 11.6 km^{2} (4.5 sq mi)
- Elevation: 174 m (571 ft)
- Highest elevation: 344 m (1,129 ft)
- Lowest elevation: 165 m (541 ft)
- Population (2023): 4,616
  - Density: 398/km^{2} (1,030/sq mi)
- Time zone: UTC+01:00 (CET)
  - Summer (DST): UTC+02:00 (CEST)
- INSEE/Postal code: 57032 /57130
- ^{1} French Land Register data, which excludes lakes, ponds, glaciers > 1 km^{2} (0.386 sq mi or 247 acres) and river estuaries.

Ars-sur-Moselle (French pronunciation: [aʁs syʁ mɔzɛl], literally Ars on Moselle; German: Ars an der Mosel) is a commune in the Moselle department in Grand Est in northeastern France.

== History ==
Ars-sur-Moselle was a part of Germany, in the imperial territory of Alsace-Lorraine, from 1871 to 1918. It was called Ars-an-der-Mosel in German.

== Sights ==
The town has a handsome Roman Catholic church. In the vicinity are the remains of a Roman aqueduct, which formerly spanned the valley.

== Population ==
Historical population

Year	Pop.	±% p.a.
1793	1,171	—
1821	1,307	+0.39%
1841	1,453	+0.53%
1871	5,371	+4.45%
1900	4,081	−0.94%
1926	3,274	−0.84%
1946	2,524	−1.29%
1962	5,182	+4.60%
1968	5,393	+0.67%

Year	Pop.	±% p.a.
1975	5,469	+0.20%
1982	5,039	−1.16%
1990	5,084	+0.11%
1999	5,001	−0.18%
2007	4,669	−0.85%
2012	4,782	+0.48%
2017	4,723	−0.25%
2023	4,616	−0.38%

Source: EHESS and INSEE (1968-2023)

== See also ==
- Communes of the Moselle department
