= Jussy, Moselle =

Jussy
- Commune
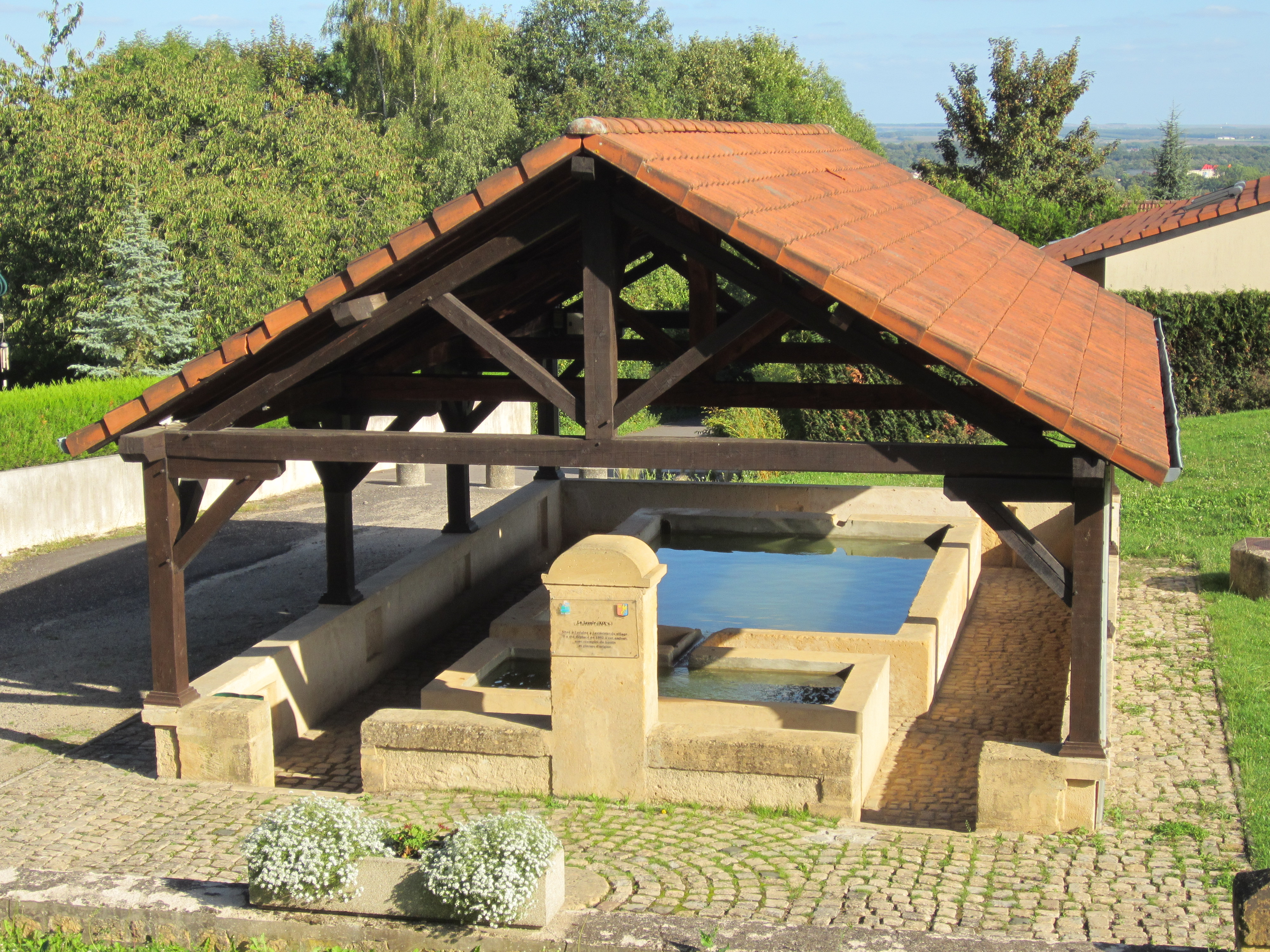
- The washhouse in Jussy

- Coat of arms
- Location of Jussy
- Location within France Location within Grand Est
- Coordinates: 49°06′07″N 6°05′13″E
- Country: France
- Region: Grand Est
- Department: Moselle
- Arrondissement: Metz
- Canton: Les Coteaux de Moselle
- Intercommunality: Metz Métropole

Government
  - Mayor (2020–2026): Pierre Fachot
- Area^{1}: 2.91 km^{2} (1.12 sq mi)
- Elevation: 280 m (920 ft)
- Highest elevation: 345 m (1,132 ft)
- Lowest elevation: 165 m (541 ft)
- Population (2023): 466
  - Density: 160/km^{2} (415/sq mi)
- Time zone: UTC+01:00 (CET)
  - Summer (DST): UTC+02:00 (CEST)
- INSEE/Postal code: 57352 /57130
- ^{1} French Land Register data, which excludes lakes, ponds, glaciers > 1 km^{2} (0.386 sq mi or 247 acres) and river estuaries.

Jussy (French pronunciation: [ʒysi]; German: Jussingen) is a commune in the Moselle department in Grand Est in north-eastern France.

== See also ==
- Communes of the Moselle department
