= Cuvry =

- Commune
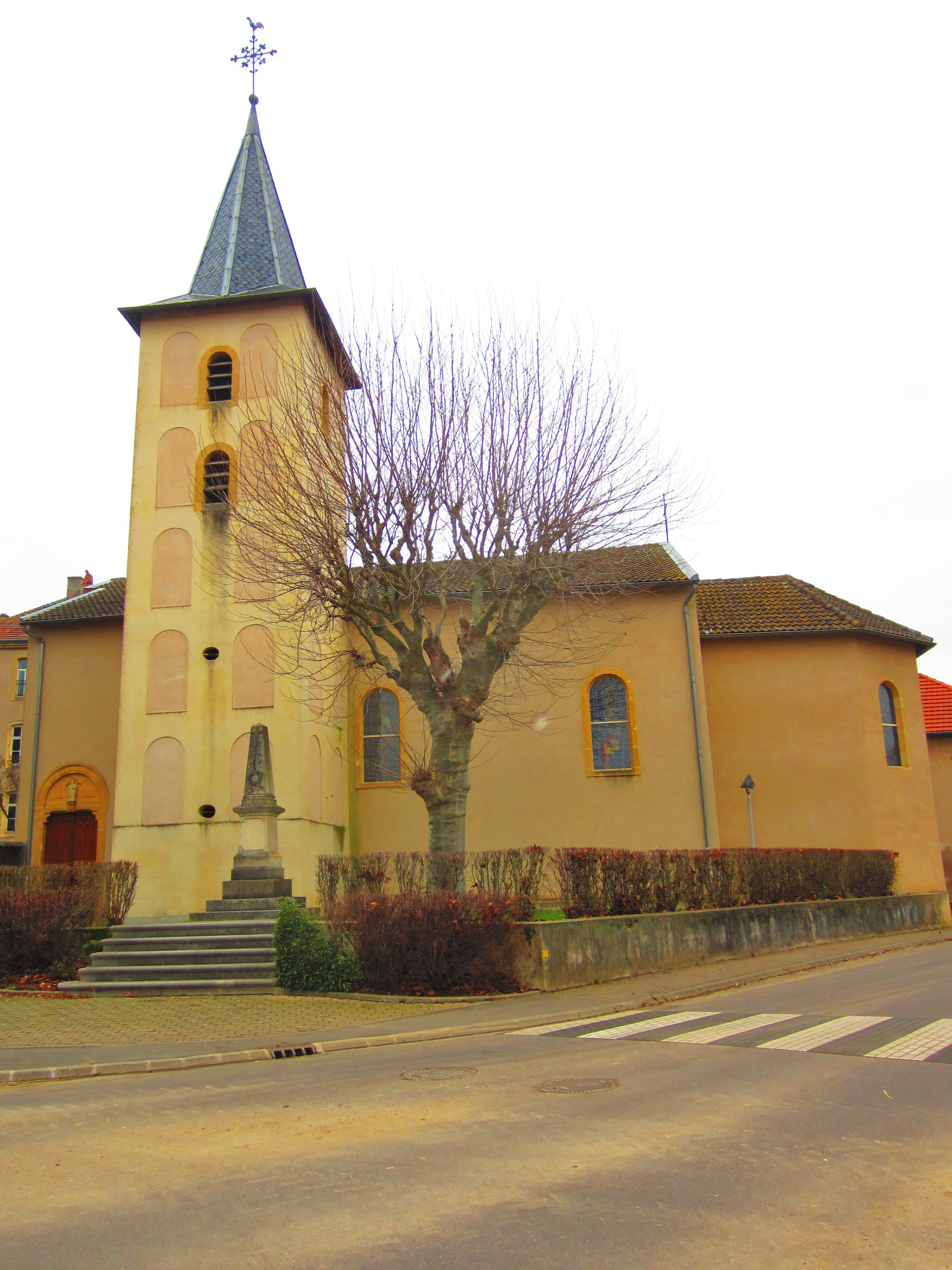
- The church in Cuvry

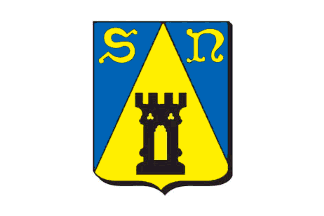
- Flag Coat of arms
- Location of Cuvry
- Location within France Location within Grand Est
- Coordinates: 49°02′38″N 6°09′36″E
- Country: France
- Region: Grand Est
- Department: Moselle
- Arrondissement: Metz
- Canton: Les Coteaux de Moselle
- Intercommunality: Metz Métropole

Government
  - Mayor (2020–2026): François Carpentier
- Area^{1}: 5.44 km^{2} (2.10 sq mi)
- Elevation: 175 m (574 ft)
- Highest elevation: 198 m (650 ft)
- Lowest elevation: 167 m (548 ft)
- Population (2023): 1,096
  - Density: 201/km^{2} (522/sq mi)
- Demonym(s): Cuvréiens, Cuvréiennes
- Time zone: UTC+01:00 (CET)
  - Summer (DST): UTC+02:00 (CEST)
- INSEE/Postal code: 57162 /57420
- ^{1} French Land Register data, which excludes lakes, ponds, glaciers > 1 km^{2} (0.386 sq mi or 247 acres) and river estuaries.

Cuvry (French pronunciation: [kyvʁi]; German: Kubern) is a commune in the Moselle department in Grand Est in north-eastern France.

== See also ==
- Communes of the Moselle department
