= List of châteaux in Lorraine =

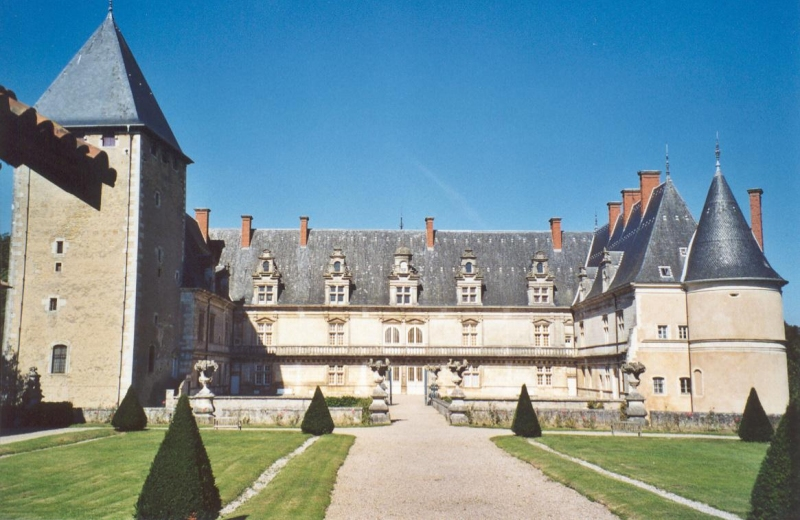
Château de Fléville

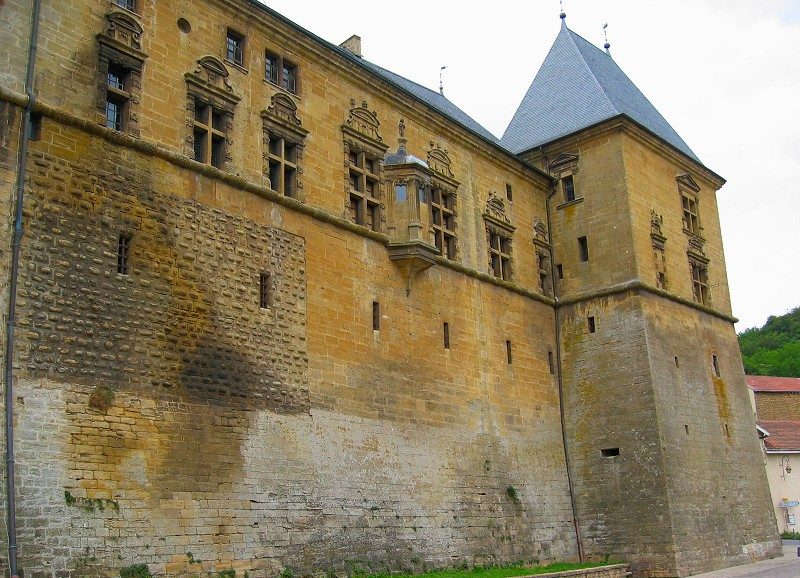
château de Cons-la-Grandville

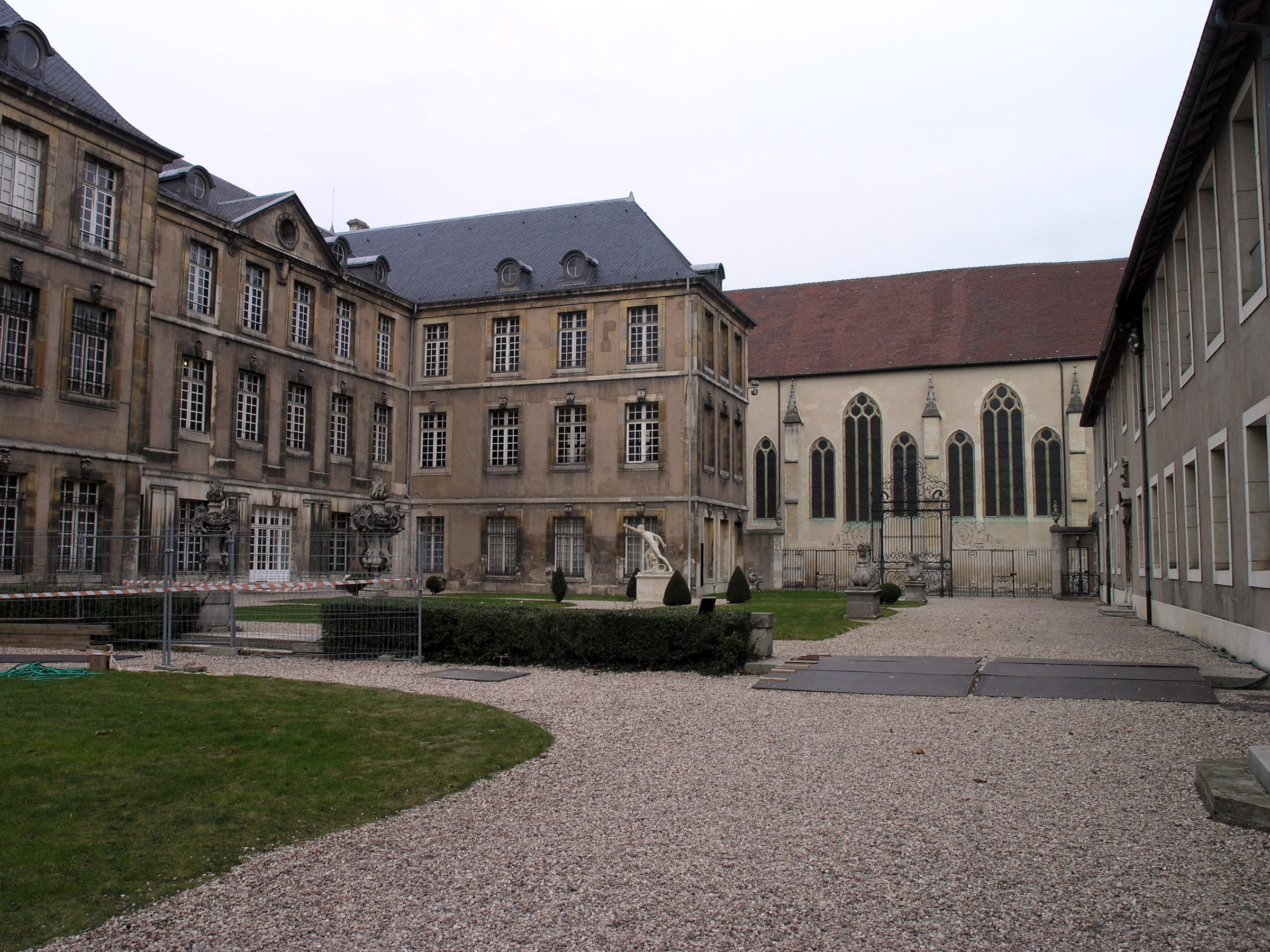
Palace of the Dukes of Lorraine in Nancy

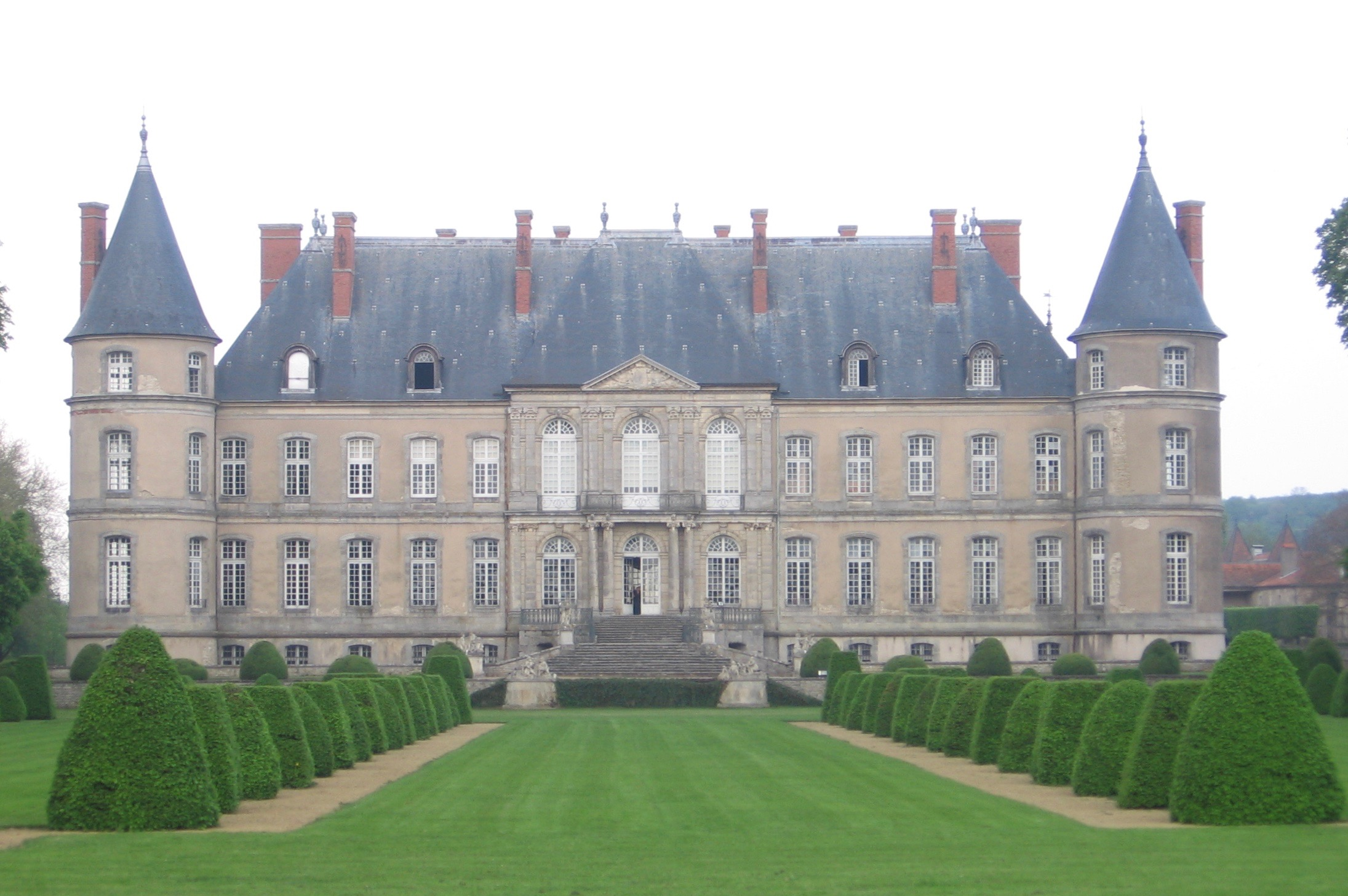
Château d'Haroué

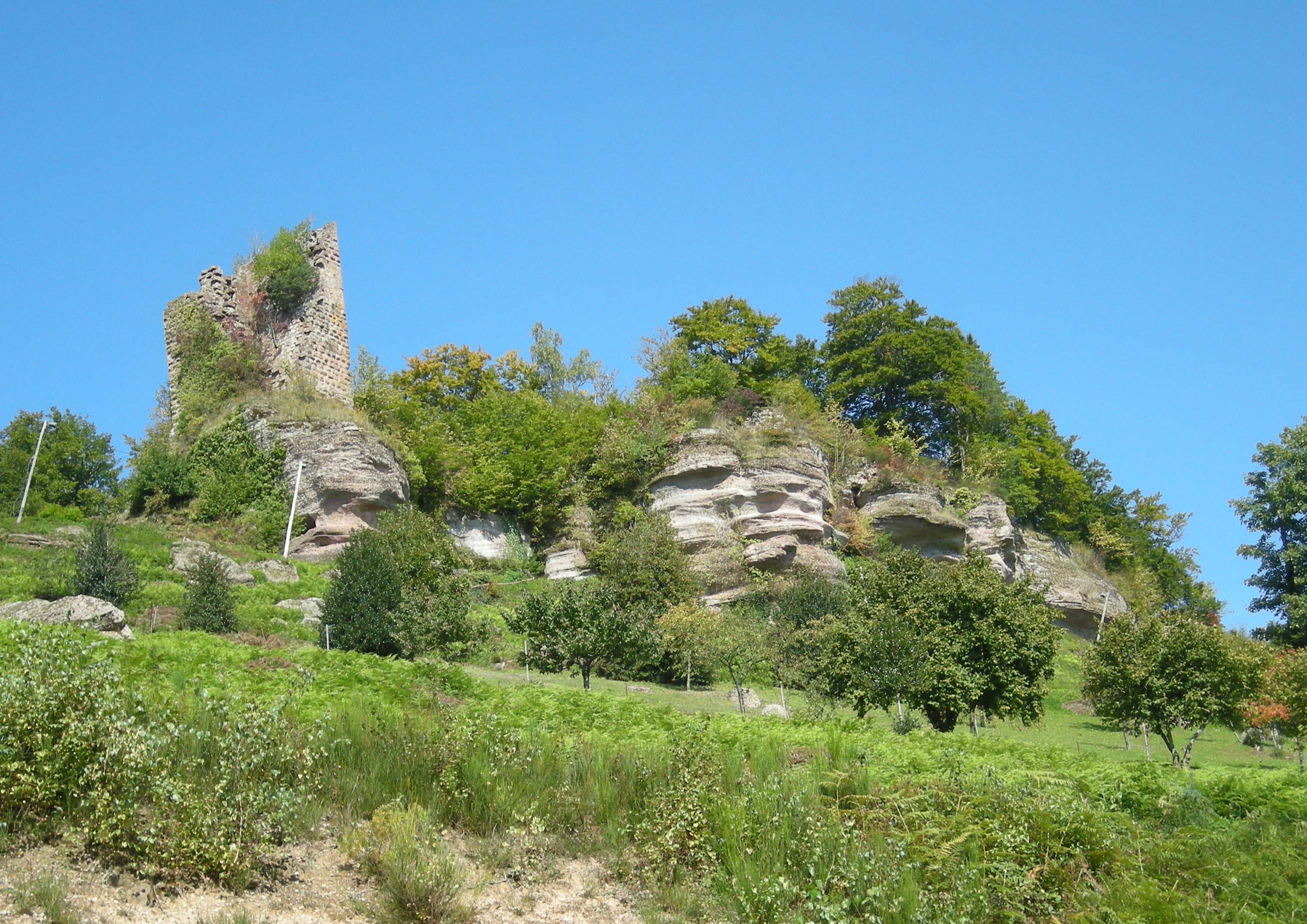
Château de Pierre-Percée

This is a list of châteaux in the former French region of Lorraine.

== Meurthe-et-Moselle ==
- Château Anthoine in Vandœuvre-lès-Nancy
- Château d'Adoménil in Rehainviller
- Château de Bainville-aux-Miroirs in Bainville-aux-Miroirs
- Maison-forte de Barisey in Barisey-au-Plain
- Château de Blâmont in Blâmont
- Maison-forte médiévale in Boucq
- Château médiéval in Bouvron, Meurthe-et-Moselle
- Château de Brabois in Villers-lès-Nancy
- Château de Clémery in Clémery
- Château de Cons-la-Grandville in Cons-la-Grandville
- Château de Dieulouard in Dieulouard
- Palais des Ducs de Lorraine in Nancy (Palace)
- Château d'Euvezin in Euvezin
- Château de Fléville in Fléville-devant-Nancy
- Château de Gerbéviller in Gerbéviller
- Château d'Haroué aka Palais d'Haroué in Haroué (Palace)
- Château d'Hausen in Hombourg-Haut
- Château d'Haussonville in Haussonville
- Château de Jaillon in Jaillon
- Château de Jaulny in Jaulny
- Château de Longwy in Longwy, (Ruins) now the Citadelle Vauban
- Château de Lunéville in Lunéville (Palace)
- Château de Madame de Graffigny in Villers-lès-Nancy
- Château de Mailly in Mailly-sur-Seille
- Château de Manoncourt in Manoncourt-sur-Seille (Palace)
- Château de Montaigu in Laneuveville-devant-Nancy
- Château de Morey in Belleau
- Château de Mousson in Mousson
- Château de Moyen in Moyen
- Château de Neuviller-sur-Moselle in Neuviller-sur-Moselle
- Château de Nomeny in Nomeny
- Château de Pierrefort in Martincourt
- Château de Pierre-Percée in Pierre-Percée
- Château de Prény in Prény
- Château de Pierre-Percée (castle of the Counts of Salm) in Pierre-Percée
- Château de Rémicourt in Villers-lès-Nancy
- Château de Vaudémont (castle of the Counts of Vaudémont) in Vaudémont
- Château de Vandeléville in Vandeléville (Palace)
- Château de Ville-au-Val in Ville-au-Val
- Château de la Franche-Moitresse (residence of the architect Emmanuel Héré de Corny) in Eulmont
- Château de la Rochotte in Pierre-la-Treiche
- Château des comtes de Ludres in Ludres.
- Château du Montet in Vandœuvre-lès-Nancy
- Maison-forte de Tumejus in Bulligny
- Maison-forte de Sexey-aux-Forges in Sexey-aux-Forges
- Maison-forte de Villey-Saint-Étienne in Villey-Saint-Étienne

== Meuse ==
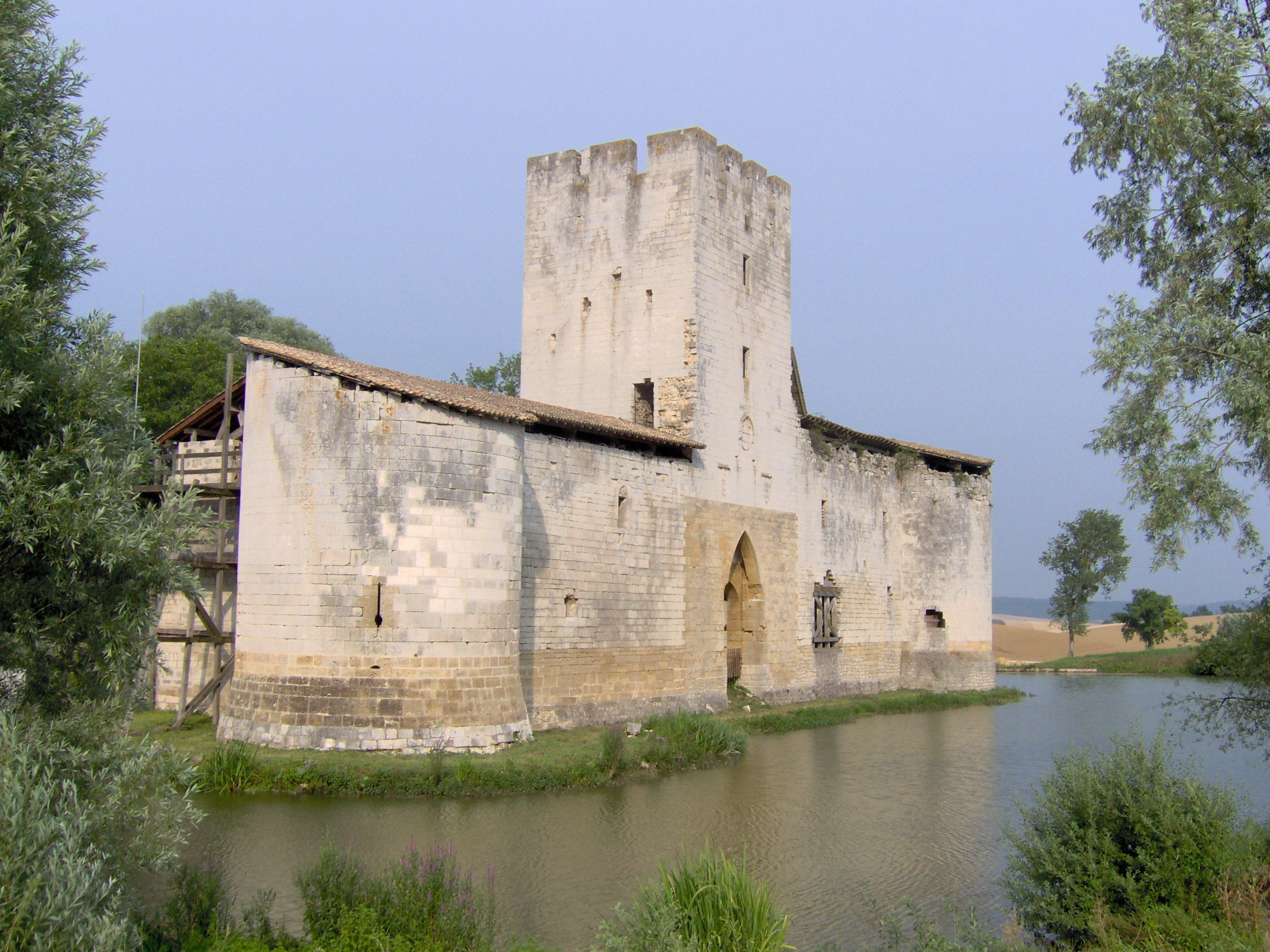
Château de Gombervaux

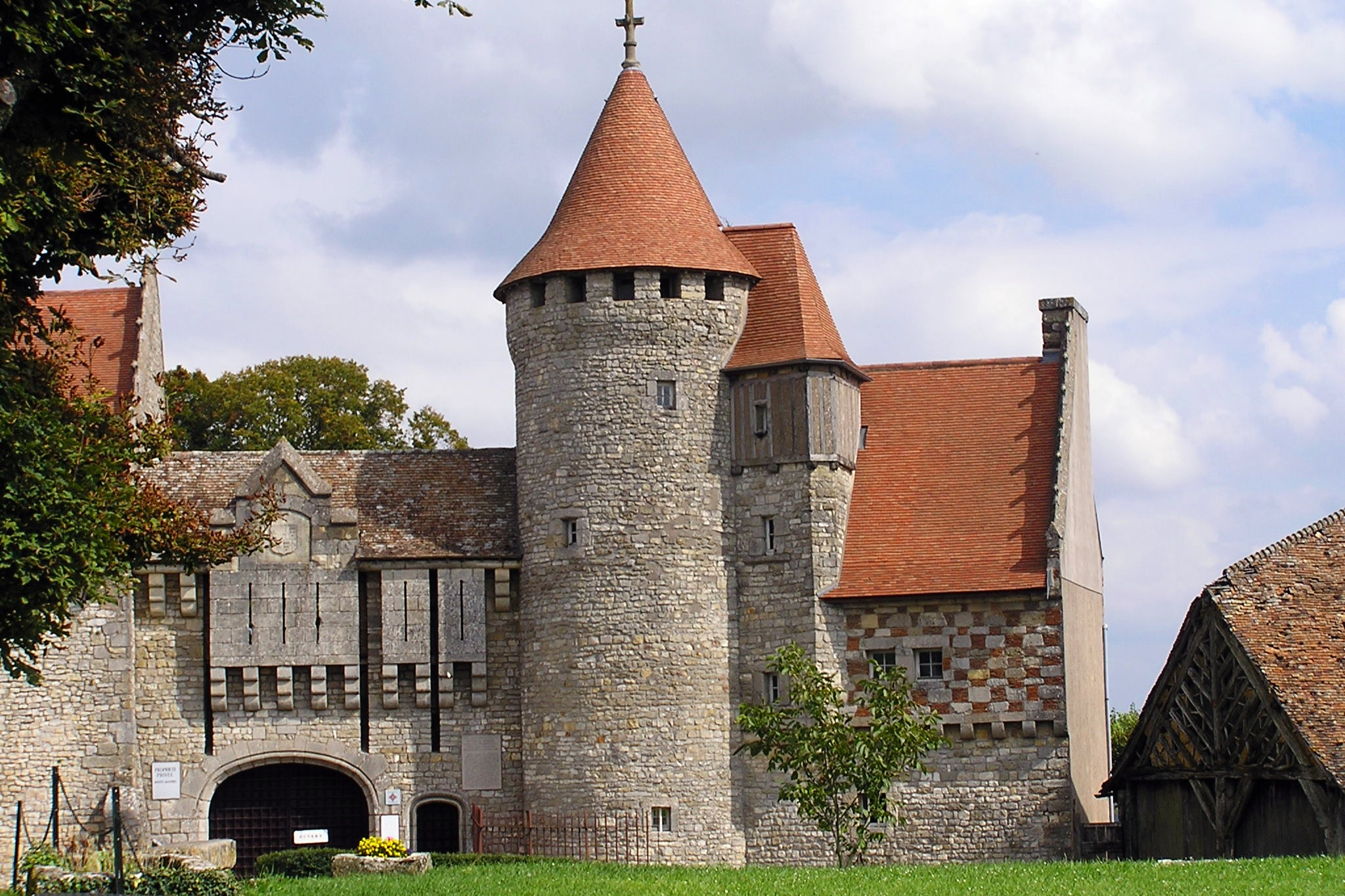
Château de Hattonchâtel

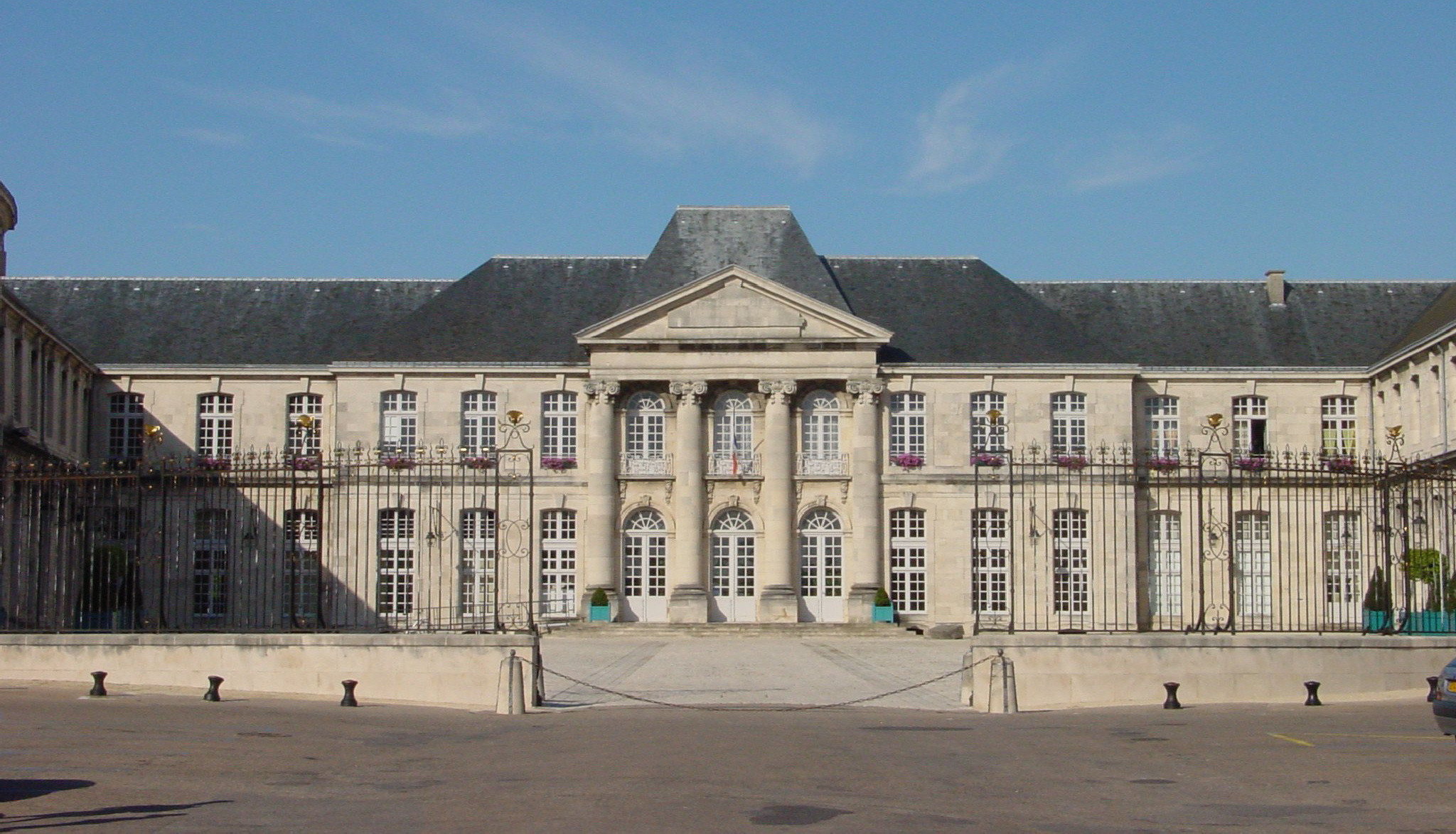
Château de Commercy

- Château Claudot in Beurey-sur-Saulx
- Château du Clos in Sampigny
- Château de Commercy in Commercy
- Château des ducs de Bar in Bar-le-Duc
- Château de Fresnois in Montmédy
- Château de Gombervaux in Vaucouleurs
- Château de Hattonchâtel in Vigneulles-lès-Hattonchâtel
- Château de la Malpierre in Rigny-la-Salle
- Château de Ligny-en-Barrois in Ligny-en-Barrois
- Château de Louppy-sur-Loison in Louppy-sur-Loison
- Château de Montbras in Montbras
- Château des Monthairons, in Monthairons
- Château de Montmédy in Montmédy
- Château de Sampigny in Sampigny
- Château de Thillombois in Thillombois
- Château de la Varenne in Haironville
- Château de Vaucouleurs in Vaucouleurs
- Château de Ville-sur-Saulx, Ville-sur-Saulx

== Moselle ==
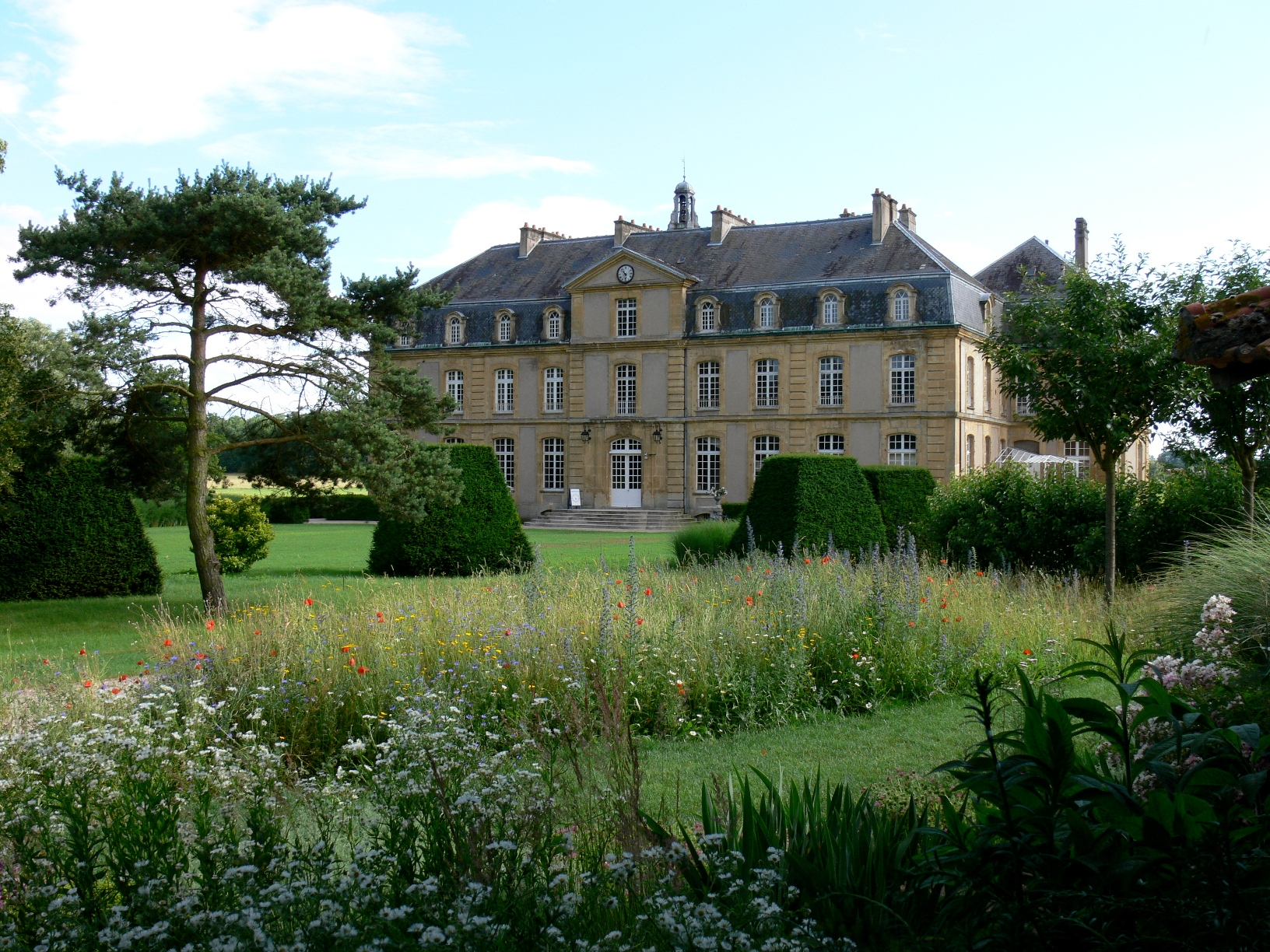
Château de Pange

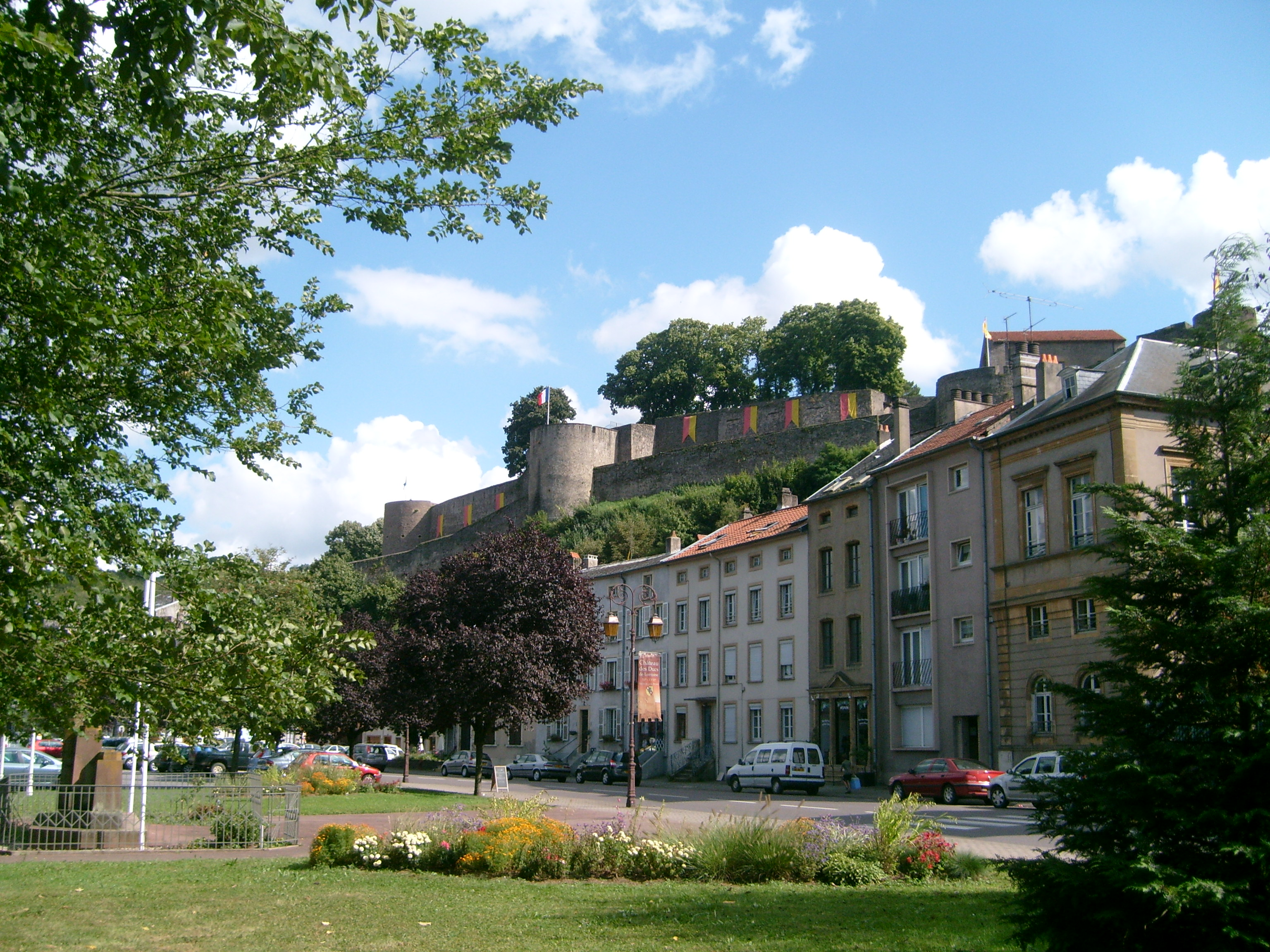
Fortress of Sierck-les-Bains

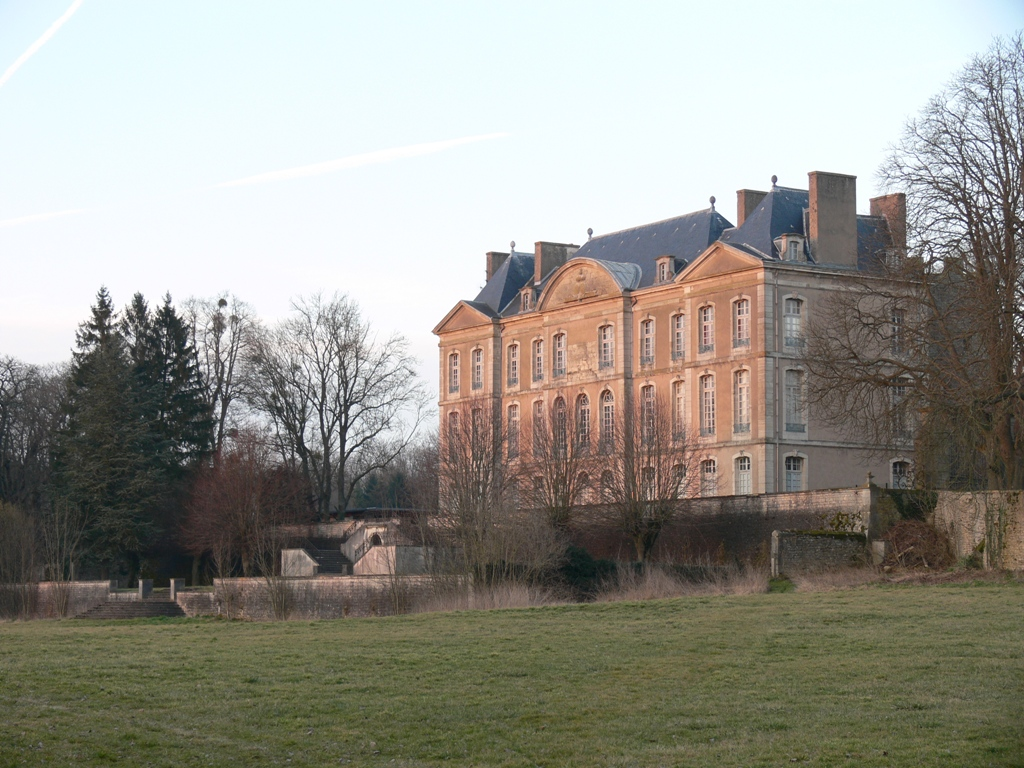
Château d'Aulnois-sur-Seille

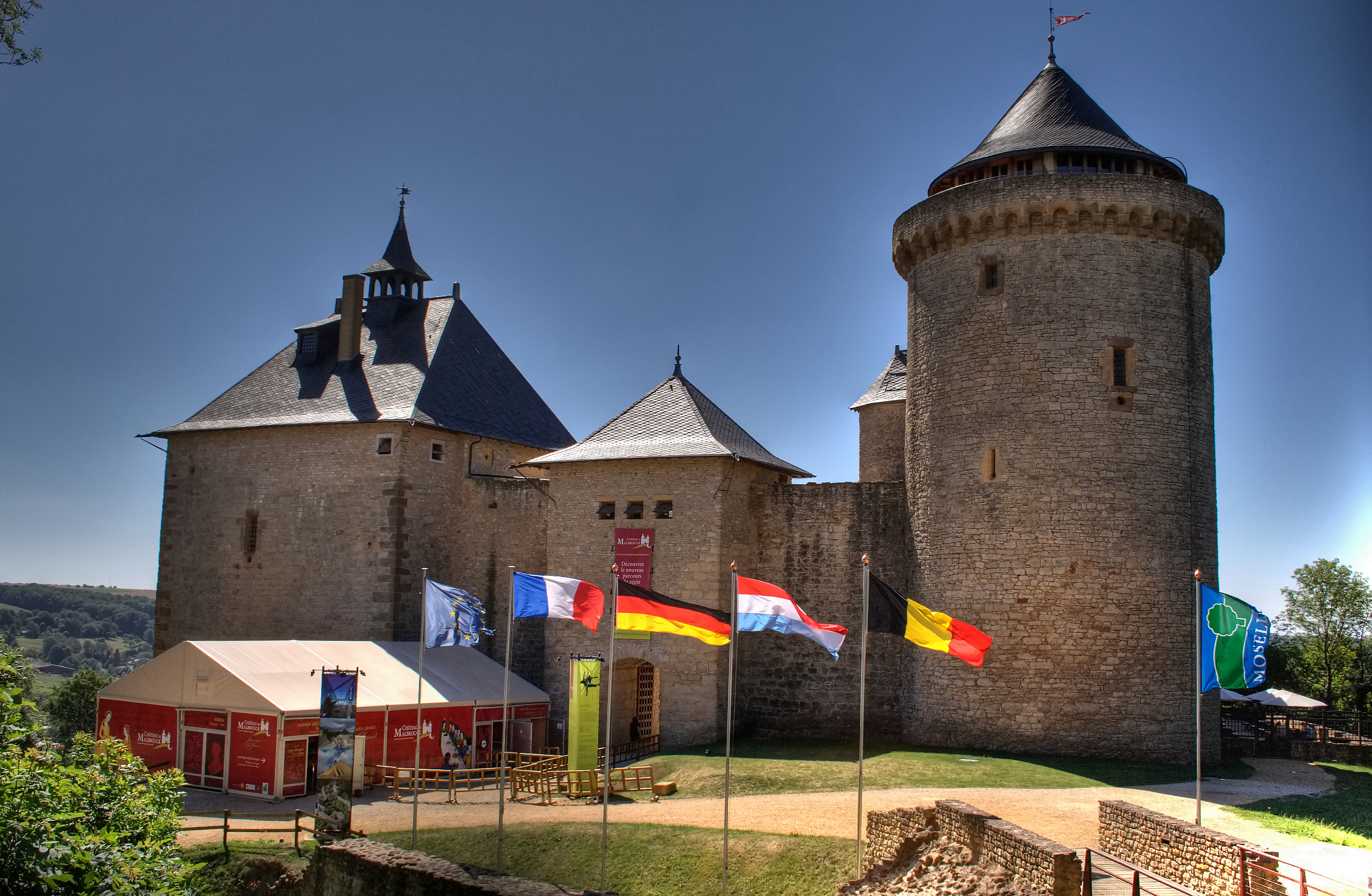
Château de Malbrouck

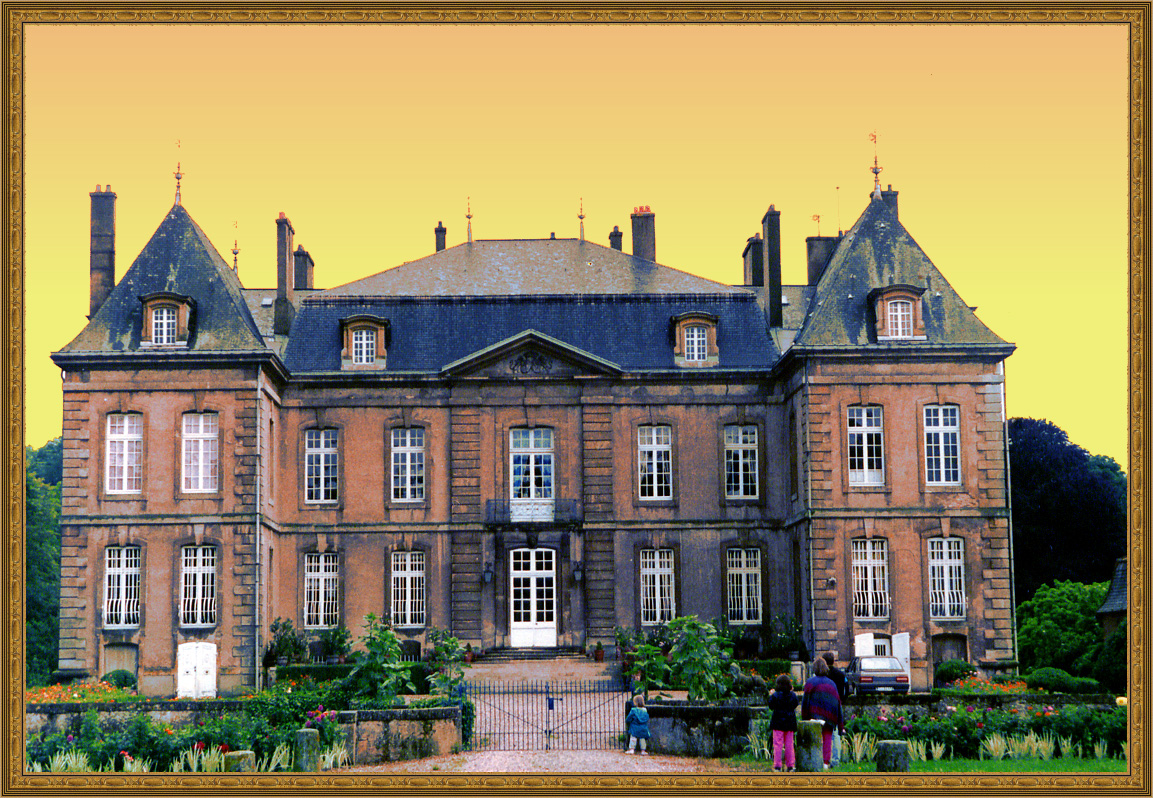
Château de La Grange

- Château d'Alteville in Tarquimpol
- Château d'Ancerville in Ancerville
- Château d'Arry in Arry
- Château d'Aubigny in Coincy
- Château d'Aulnois in Aulnois-sur-Seille
- Château de Berg-sur-Moselle in Berg-sur-Moselle
- Citadelle de Bitche in Bitche
- Château de Blettange in Bousse
- Château de Bourg-Esch in Schwerdorff
- Château de Burthécourt in Salonnes
- Château de Buy in Antilly
- Château de Charlesville-sous-bois
- Château de Chérisey in Chérisey
- Château de Colombey in Coincy
- Château de Courcelles in Montigny-lès-Metz
- Château de Craincourt in Craincourt
- Château des ducs de Lorraine in Sierck-les-Bains
- Château des Étangs, Les Étangs
- Château Fabert in Moyeuvre
- Château du Falkenstein in Philippsbourg
- Château de Fénétrange in Fénétrange
- Château de Gentersberg in Hanviller
- Château du Grand-Arnsberg in Baerenthal
- Château de Ramstein in Baerenthal
- Château des Hayes in Hayes
- Château d'Helfedange in Guinglange
- Château de Helfenstein in Philippsbourg
- Château de Hellering in Hombourg-Haut
- Château d’Henriette de Lorraine in Saint-Avold
- Château de Hingsange in Grostenquin
- Château du Hohe Weyersberg in Mouterhouse
- Château de Hombourg-Budange in Hombourg-Budange
- Château de Hombourg-Haut in Hombourg-Haut
- Château de La Grange in Manom (Renaissance castle)
- Château des Lanzy in Meisenthal
- Château de Logne in Rurange-lès-Thionville
- Château de Lue in Hayes
- Château de Luttange in Luttange
- Château de Lutzelbourg in Lutzelbourg
- Château de Malbrouck in Manderen
- Château de Mardigny in Lorry-Mardigny
- Château de Meinsberg in Manderen
- Château de Mercy in Ars-Laquenexy
- Château de Montoy, à Montoy-Flanville
- Château de Moulins-lès-Metz in Moulins-lès-Metz
- Château de Mouterhouse in Mouterhouse
- Château d'Oriocourt in Oriocourt
- Château d'Ottange in Ottange
- Château de Pange in Pange
- Château de Preiche in Basse-Rentgen
- Château de Rahling in Rahling
- Château du Ramstein in Baerenthal
- Château de Réhicourt in Réhicourt-le-Château
- Cité fortifiée de Rodemack in Rodemack
- Château de Romécourt in Azoudange
- Château de Rothenbourg in Philippsbourg
- Château de Roussy-le-Bourg in Roussy-le-Bourg
- Château de Rudlingen in Sierck-les-Bains
- Château Saint-Oswald in Beckerholz (Filstroff)
- Château Saint-Sixte in Freistroff
- Château de Sarreck in Oberstinzel
- Château du Schlossberg in Forbach
- Château de Sierck in Sierck (Ruins)
- Château de Sonis in Mouterhouse
- Château de Thionville in Thionville
- Château de Turquestein in Turquestein-Blancrupt
- Château de Vernéville in Vernéville
- Château fort de Vry in Vry
- Château de Waldeck in Eguelshardt
- Château de Woippy in Woippy
- Palais abbatial de Gorze in Gorze
- Le Hoff in Guentrange (Thionville)

== Vosges ==
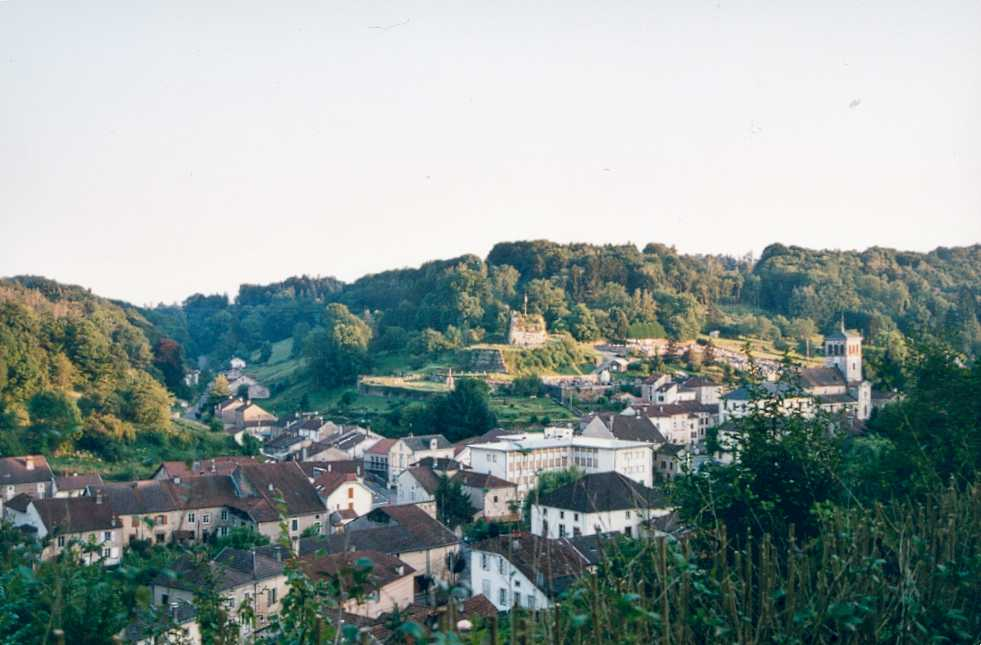
Ruines of the Château de Fontenoy-le-Château

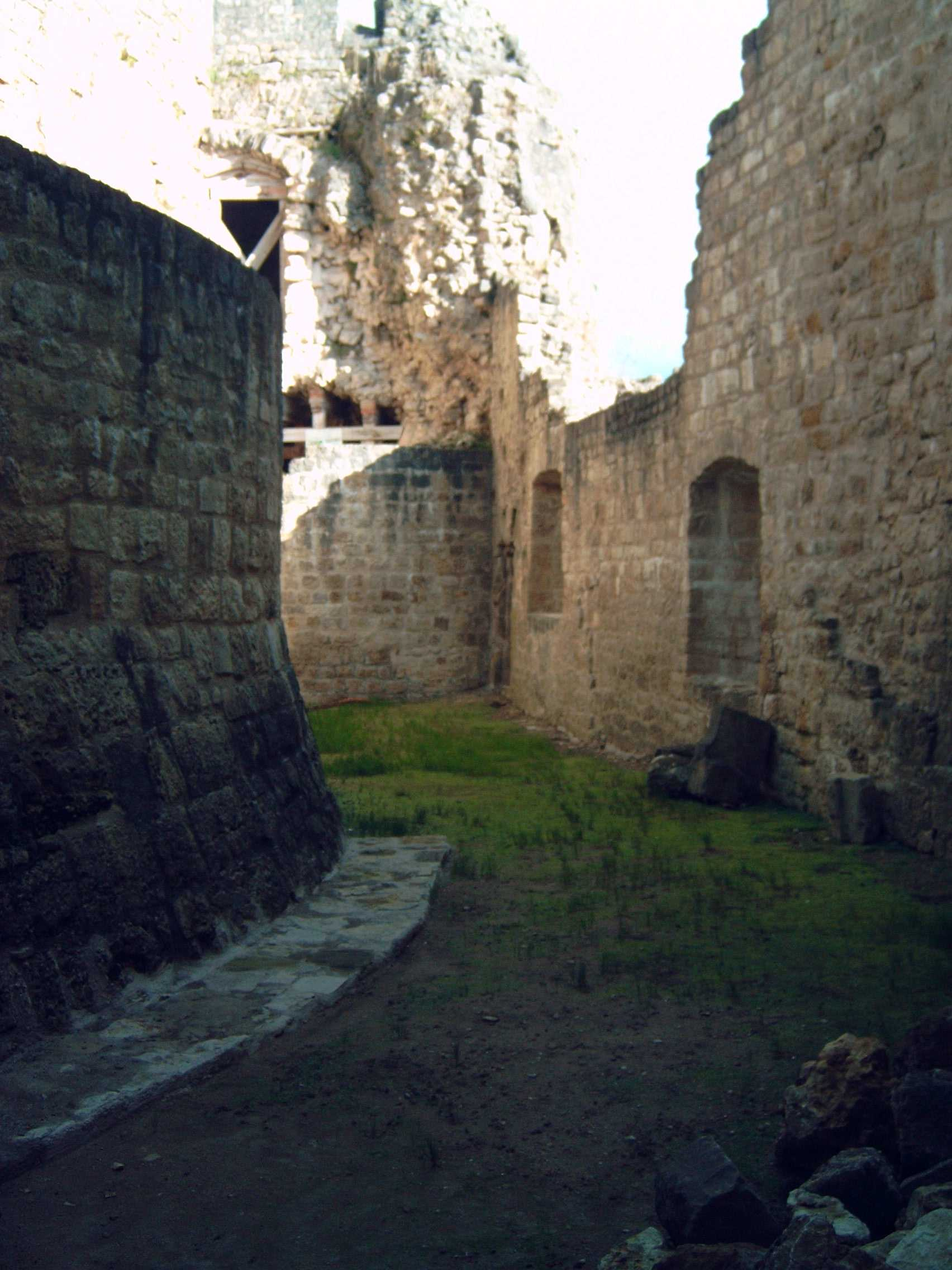
Forteresse de Châtel-sur-Moselle

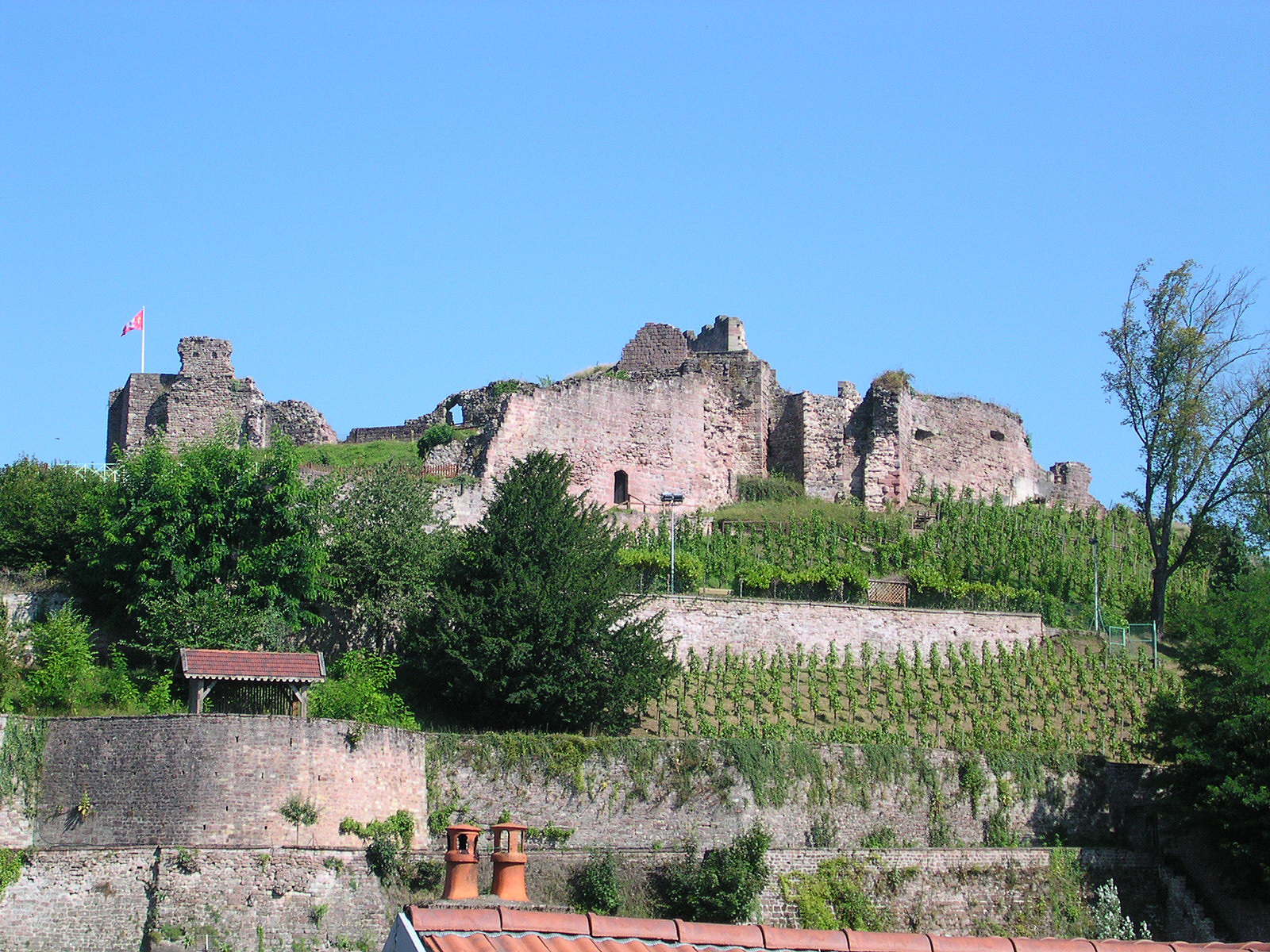
Château d'Épinal

- Château d'Autigny in Autigny-la-Tour
- Château de Beaufremont in Beaufremont
- Château de Bourlémont in Frebécourt
- Château de Bruyères in Bruyères
- Forteresse de Châtel-sur-Moselle in Châtel-sur-Moselle
- Château d'Épinal in Épinal
- Château de Failloux in Jeuxey
- Château de Fontenoy-le-Château in Fontenoy-le-Château
- Château de Girecourt-sur-Durbion in Girecourt-sur-Durbion
- Chateau de Lichecourt in Relanges,
- Château de Saint-Baslemont in Saint-Baslemont
- Château de Saint-Jean-du-Marché in La Neuveville-devant-Lépanges
- Château de Thuillières in Thuillières
- Château des Brasseurs in Xertigny
- Maison-forte de Bulgnéville in Bulgnéville
- Versailles vosgien in Saulxures-sur-Moselotte
- Châteaux des comtes de Salm-Salm in Senones

== See also ==
- List of castles in France
