= Château de Thillombois =

Coordinates: 48.9564°N 5.3986°E

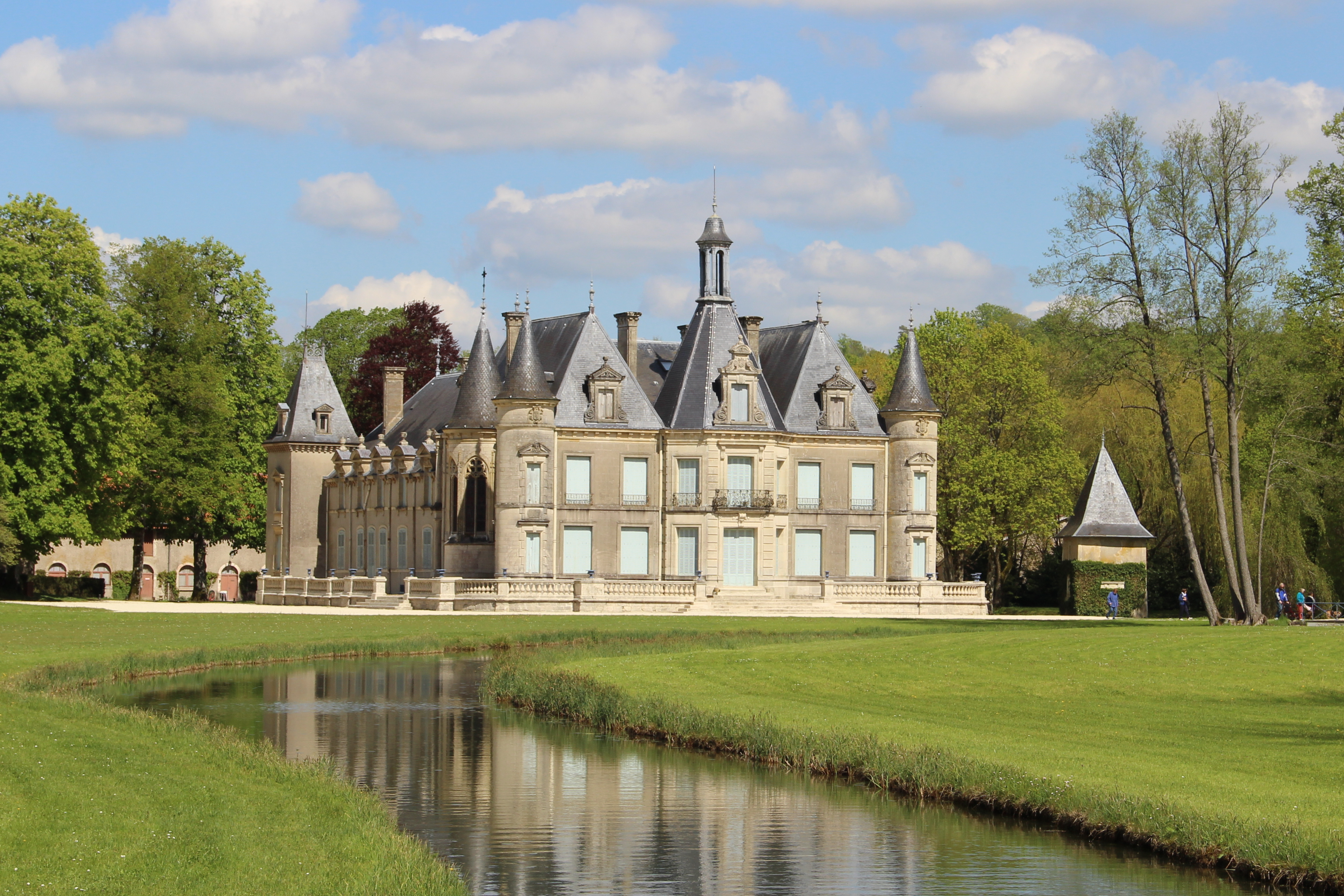
- Château de Thillombois
- Interactive map of the Château de Thillombois area

General information
- Type: Château
- Architectural style: Renaissance
- Location: Rue de Chateau 55260, Thillombois, France

The Château de Thillombois is a Renaissance château located in Thillombois, in the department of Meuse; it was significantly remodeled in the 19th century. It was admitted into the Monument historique registration on March 6, 1995.

== Description ==
The original château dates from the 12th century. Its size at the time was much larger than the current one that stands today. It was one of the largest medieval domains of the area, owned by a French noble family who also possessed, among others, the Château de Jarny, located in what is now known as Jarny in the department of Meurthe-et-Moselle. Heavily damaged in the 17th century during the Thirty years War, the château managed to retain a tower and a wing, while the surrounding villages were pillaged by Croats. Restored by successive generations, emptied of all of its goods during the Reign of Terror, the castle found a new life in the 19th century when the heiress of the estate, the Countess d'Oryot-Apremont, married the Count of Nettancourt-Vaubécourt which then allowed a sufficient capital contribution to add a new main building and to restore the existing rooms around 1873.

The château remained within the Nettancourt-Vaubécourt family until 1961, where it was then acquired by the commune of Mantes-la-Ville into a summer camp center. The center fell into disuse in the 1980s. It was left to fate, until it was rented in the early 1990s by the Connaissance de la Meuse cultural association, who continued to make renovations and improvements. In 2010, the association became the official owner so that the château could remain in the public domain.

== See also ==
- List of châteaux in Lorraine
