= Jacques Viot =

French diplomat (1921–2012)

S. E. Jacques Viot (English: /viːˈoʊ/ vee-OH, French: [ʒak vjo]; 25 August 1921 – 4 July 2012) was a French academic and diplomat.

The son of Edmond Viot, a civil servant, he was educated at Lycée Louis-le-Grand before attending ENS Paris.

Formerly a lecturer at Trinity College Dublin and a professor of ENA in Paris, he served as French Ambassador to the United Kingdom from 1984 until 1986, before being granted the title of Ambassadeur de France.

In 1950 he married Jeanne de Martimprey de Romécourt.

== Honours ==
- Commandeur, Légion d'honneur
- Commandeur, Ordre national du Mérite

== See also ==
- List of Ambassadors of France to the United Kingdom
