= Château de Ville-sur-Saulx =

Château in Meuse, Grand Est, France

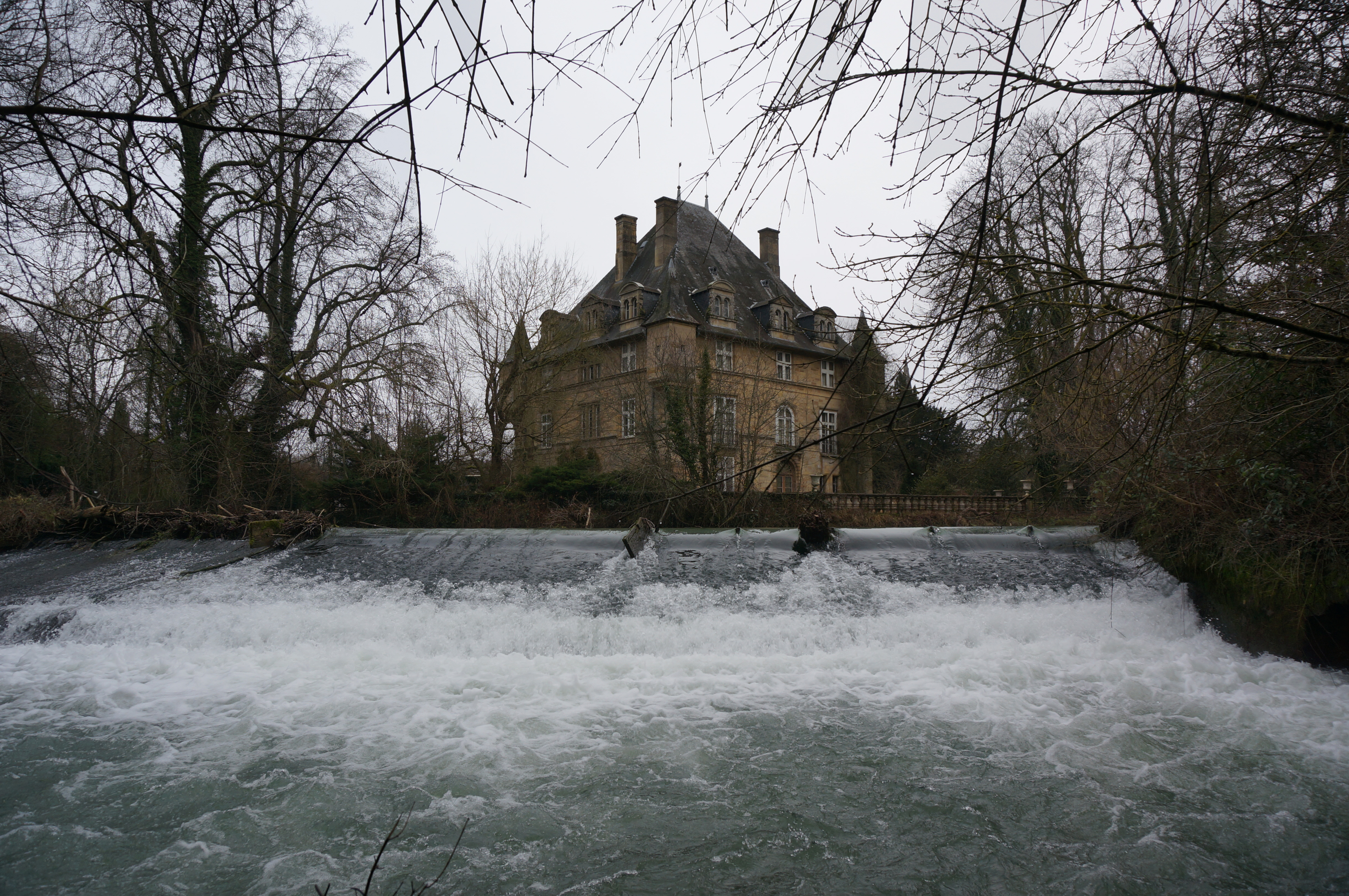
- Château de Ville-sur-Saulx

General information
- Type: Château
- Architectural style: Renaissance
- Address: 7-9 Route de Lisle 55000
- Town or city: Ville-sur-Saulx
- Country: France

The Château de Ville-sur-Saulx (commonly referred to locally as the Château de Gilles de Trèves after its first owner) is a Renaissance château located in Ville-sur-Saulx in the French department of Meuse that was built in 1550. It was admitted into the Monument historique registration on March 6, 1995.

== Description ==
The original château was built on a square base by Ligier Richier in 1550 on order of the local lord, Gilles de Trèves. The domain was expanded by the purchase of a paper mill and a mill attested from the 14th century over the Saulx river near the village of Lisle-en-Rigault.

Acquired in 1892 by the Claudel family, an English garden was built on the grounds. Today, the garden is classified, along with the Cast iron bridge on the Saulx. It was here where Paul Claudel wrote one of his greatest plays called "Le Partage de Midi".

A part of the park is located within the municipality of Lisle-en-Rigault.

== See also ==
- List of châteaux in Lorraine
