= Château de Pierrefort =

Ruined castle in Meurthe-et-Moselle, France

Coordinates: 48°50′29″N 5°56′19″E

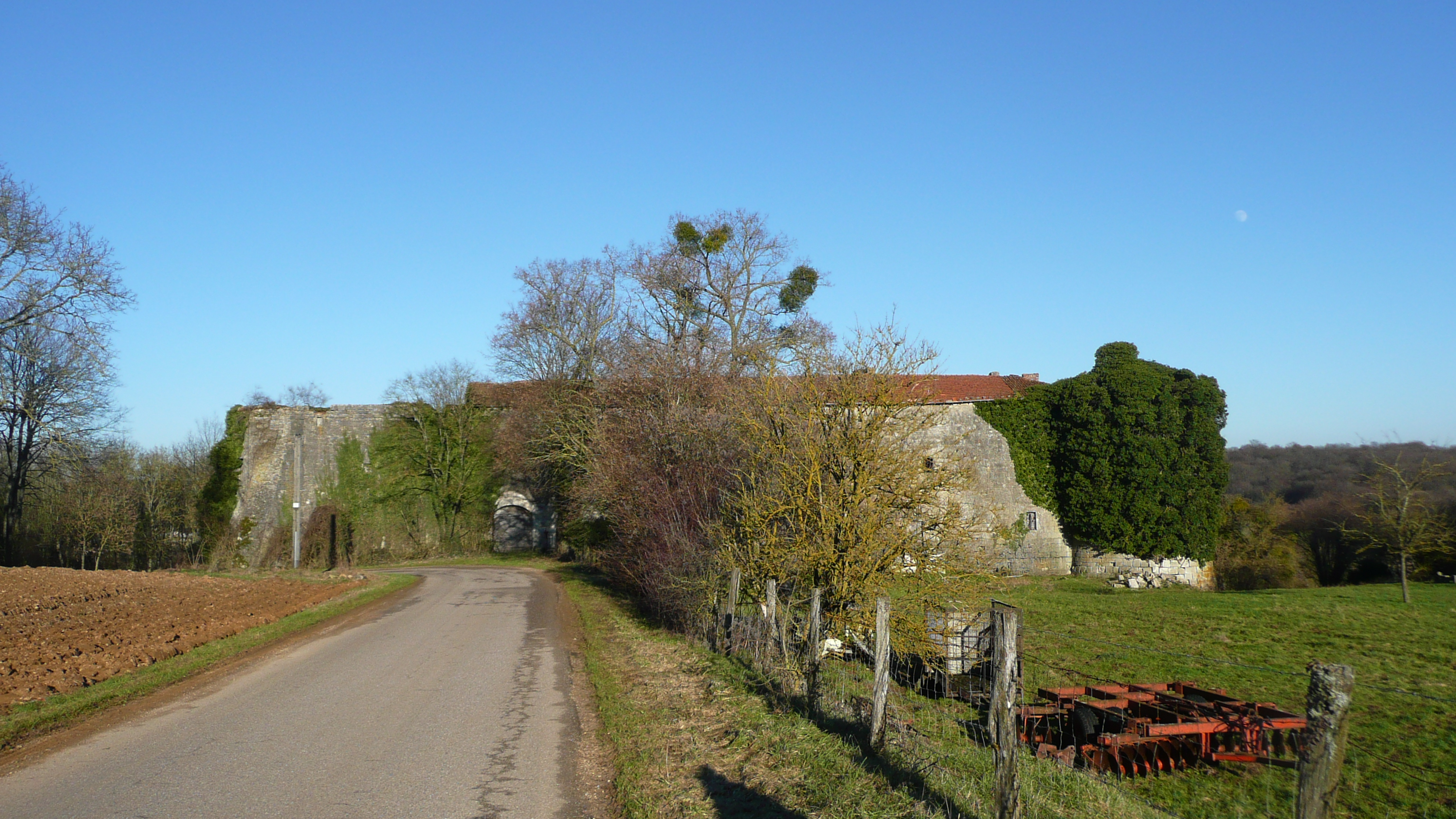
General view of the Château de Pierrefort. Main entrance.

The Château de Pierrefort is a ruined mediaeval castle in the commune of Martincourt in the Meurthe-et-Moselle département of France.

== History ==
The earliest recorded mention of the castle is in a work by Richard de Wissembourg, Antiquitez de la Gaule Belgique, Royaume de France, Austrasie et Lorraine, which says that before the present castle there was an older one "tout ruyné et démoly" ("completely ruined and demolished").

The new fortress was built in 1306. In 1300, Pierre de Bar, younger son (among 13 siblings) of Theobald II, Count of Bar, received from his older brother Henri III de Bar among other estates, the lands of Martincourt and Mamey. In 1306, his legal documents mention : "A savoir, le chastel que je fais dessour Martincourt et la forteresse et les appendises toutes entièrement dou dit chastel."

It has been listed since 1862 as a monument historique by the French Ministry of Culture.

== See also ==
- List of castles in France
- List of châteaux in Lorraine
