= Château de Fléville =

Castle in Meurthe-et-Moselle, Lorraine, France

Coordinates: 48°37′35″N 6°12′08″E

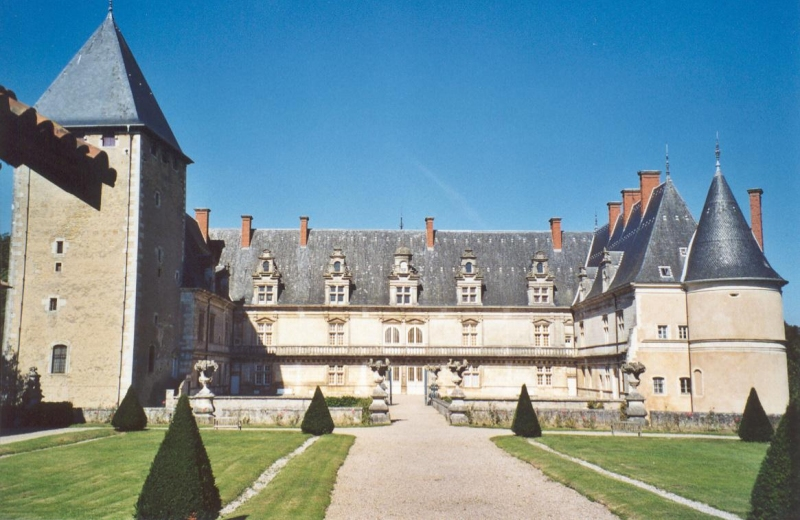
Château de Fléville

The Château de Fléville is a castle located in the commune of Fléville-devant-Nancy, Meurthe-et-Moselle, in Lorraine, France.

The current structure was completed in 1533 in the French Renaissance architecture style, but includes a donjon built in 1320. Fléville was one of the few châteaux in Lorraine spared by Cardinal Richelieu (acting on the orders of Louis XIII) after the Thirty Years' War.

== The Château ==
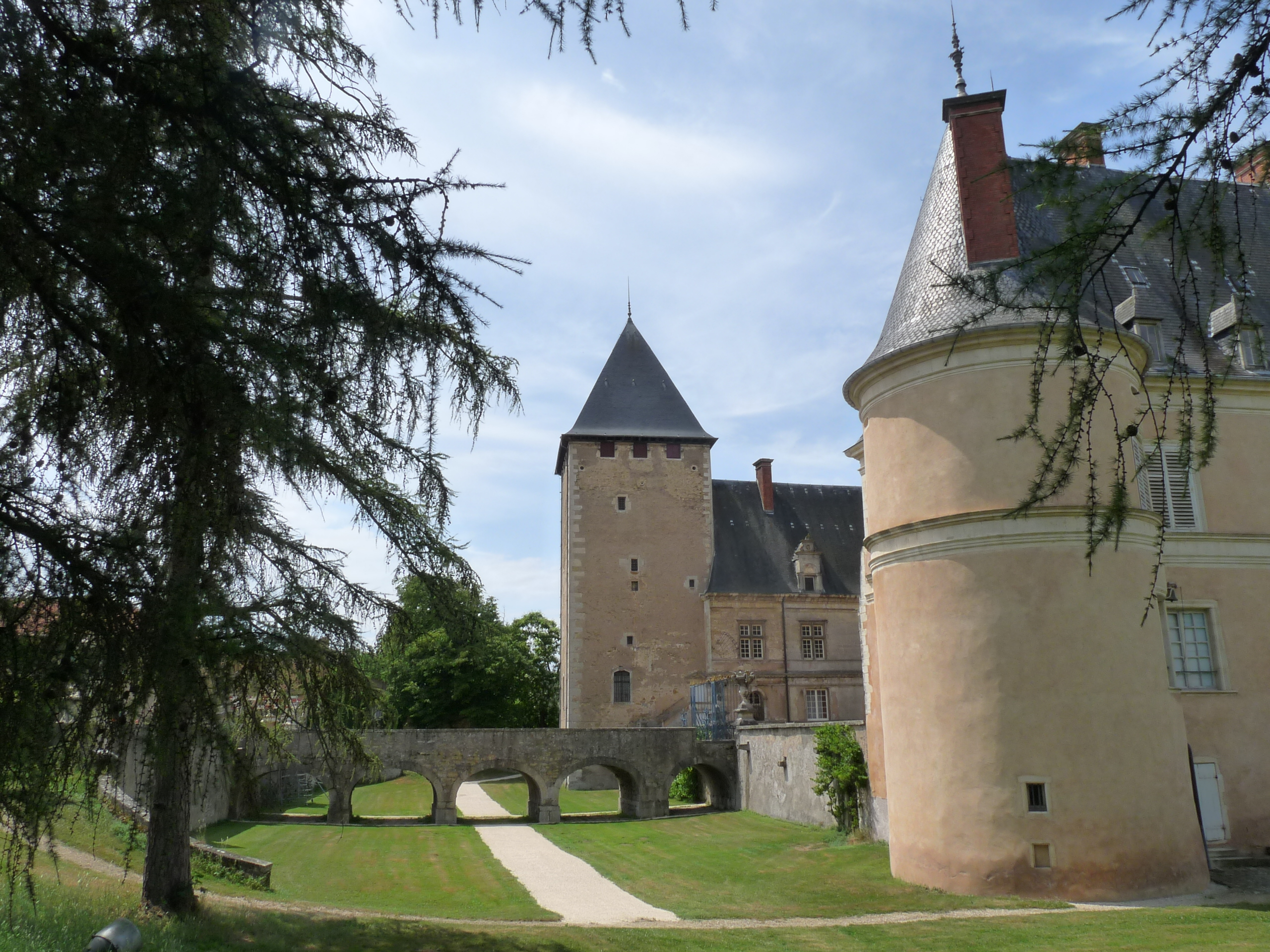
The original, square donjon and the drained moat

Fléville's architecture is mostly typical of the early French Renaissance architecture – however, it includes an unusual balcony running along the entire façade that reflects the influence of Italian architecture of the time on Lorraine. It was built around the ruins of an earlier feudal castle, including a moat that has long since been drained. The entire Château, including the furnished interior, is open to the public and includes several rooms dedicated to the history of Lorraine.

The Lambel family has owned Fléville since 1812. It was designated a historic monument in 1982.

== Notes and references ==
=== Bibliography ===
- Galerie des Ducs de Lorraine au Château de Fléville, Vagner, Nancy, 1857, 101 p.
- Victor-Melchior Jacques (abbé), Cérutti et le salon de la duchesse de Brancas à Fléville (1778-1784), impr. de Berger-Levrault, Nancy, 1888, 53 p. (from Annales de l'Est)
- Georges Poull, Fléville : son histoire et ses seigneurs, XIII^{e}-XIX^{e} s. : histoire détaillée de cette demeure et de ses possesseurs, les Fléville, les Lutzelbourg et les Beauvau, G. Poull, Rupt-sur-Moselle, 1988, 143 p.
