= Château de Romécourt =

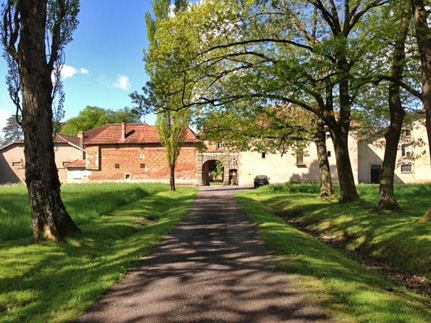
- Entrance of the château
- Location: Lorraine, France
- Coordinates: 48.713°N 6.8312°E
- Completion date: 1976

The Château de Romécourt is located in Azoudange in Moselle, and in the Lorraine Regional Natural Park (French: parc naturel régional de Lorraine) in the middle of the forest and the lakes of Sarrebourg. The castle has been registered in the French list of historical monuments since December 28, 1976.

== Construction ==
The castle was built by Michel l’Enfant in 1564. It was then completed in the 17th and 19th centuries by the addition of stables and chapel.

== Architecture ==
The façades, the well and roofs of the château are registered in the French list of historical monuments.

The buildings are made of bricks. Inspired by the Renaissance, the façade displays diamond shapes. The access is guarded by two doors "French" and "German" built in stone.

== Park and forests ==
The lands of Romécourt include 300 hectares (740 acres) of forests, fields and nature.

== See also ==
- List of châteaux in Lorraine
