= Hayes, Moselle =

Hayes
- Commune
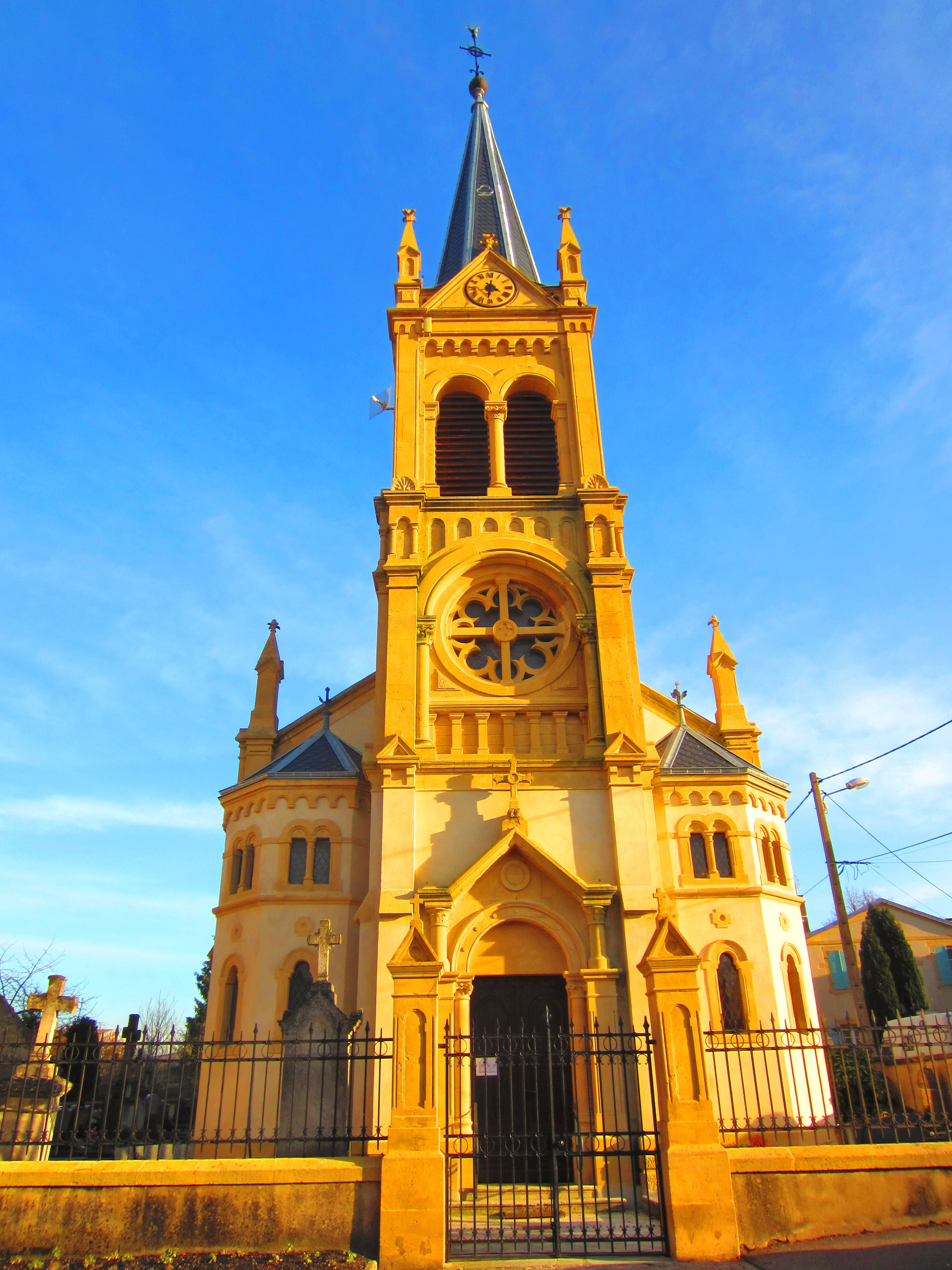
- The church in Hayes

- Coat of arms
- Location of Hayes
- Location within France Location within Grand Est
- Coordinates: 49°10′03″N 6°22′01″E
- Country: France
- Region: Grand Est
- Department: Moselle
- Arrondissement: Metz
- Canton: Le Pays Messin
- Intercommunality: Haut Chemin - Pays de Pange

Government
  - Mayor (2020–2026): André Keil
- Area^{1}: 11.99 km^{2} (4.63 sq mi)
- Elevation: 211 m (692 ft)
- Highest elevation: 307 m (1,007 ft)
- Lowest elevation: 207 m (679 ft)
- Population (2023): 251
  - Density: 20.9/km^{2} (54.2/sq mi)
- Time zone: UTC+01:00 (CET)
  - Summer (DST): UTC+02:00 (CEST)
- INSEE/Postal code: 57307 /57530
- ^{1} French Land Register data, which excludes lakes, ponds, glaciers > 1 km^{2} (0.386 sq mi or 247 acres) and river estuaries.

Hayes (German: Haiß) is a commune in the Moselle department in Grand Est in north-eastern France.

== See also ==
- Communes of the Moselle department
