= Cons-la-Grandville =

- Commune
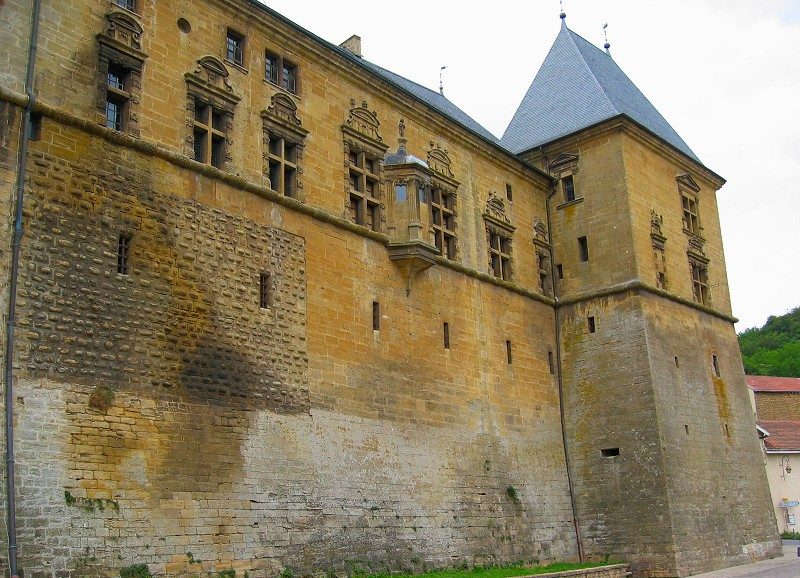
- The castle

- Coat of arms
- Location of Cons-la-Grandville
- Location within France Location within Grand Est
- Coordinates: 49°29′06″N 5°42′07″E
- Country: France
- Region: Grand Est
- Department: Meurthe-et-Moselle
- Arrondissement: Val-de-Briey
- Canton: Mont-Saint-Martin
- Intercommunality: Grand Longwy Agglomération

Government
  - Mayor (2021–2026): Véronique Castronovo
- Area^{1}: 8.25 km^{2} (3.19 sq mi)
- Elevation: 249 m (817 ft)
- Highest elevation: 388 m (1,273 ft)
- Lowest elevation: 228 m (748 ft)
- Population (2023): 522
  - Density: 63.3/km^{2} (164/sq mi)
- Time zone: UTC+01:00 (CET)
  - Summer (DST): UTC+02:00 (CEST)
- INSEE/Postal code: 54137 /54870
- ^{1} French Land Register data, which excludes lakes, ponds, glaciers > 1 km^{2} (0.386 sq mi or 247 acres) and river estuaries.

Cons-la-Grandville is a commune in the Meurthe-et-Moselle department in north-eastern France.

The Château de Cons-la-Grandville is situated in the middle of the village.

== Population ==
Historical population
Year	Pop.	±% p.a.
1968	828	—
1975	769	−1.05%
1982	669	−1.97%
1990	593	−1.50%
1999	608	+0.28%
2007	575	−0.70%
2012	582	+0.24%
2017	523	−2.12%
2023	522	−0.03%
Source: INSEE

== See also ==
- Communes of the Meurthe-et-Moselle department
