= Coincy, Moselle =

Coincy
- Commune
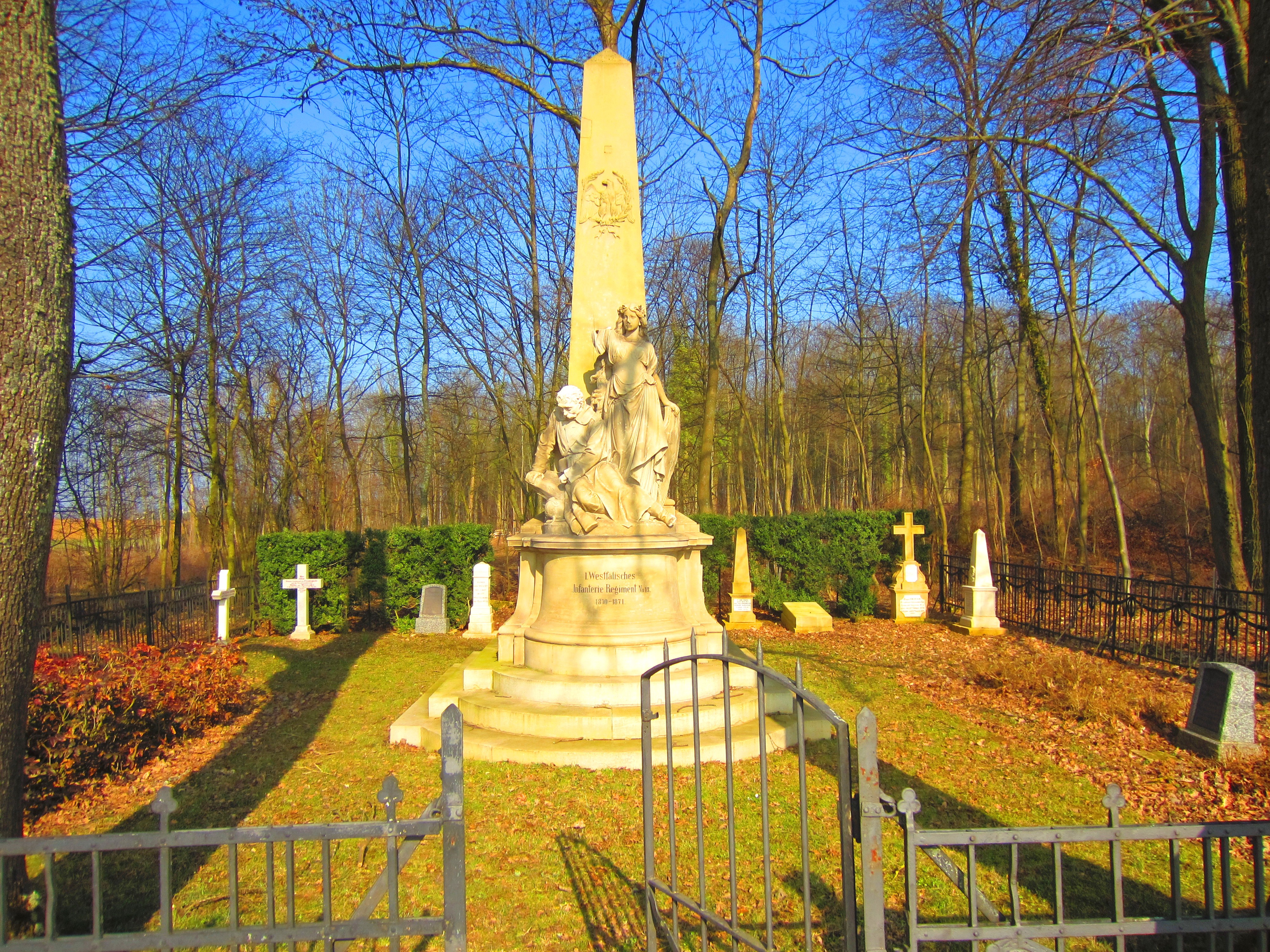
- The Prussian military cemetery in Colombey

- Coat of arms
- Location of Coincy
- Location within France Location within Grand Est
- Coordinates: 49°06′36″N 6°17′01″E
- Country: France
- Region: Grand Est
- Department: Moselle
- Arrondissement: Metz
- Canton: Le Pays Messin
- Intercommunality: Haut Chemin - Pays de Pange

Government
  - Mayor (2020–2026): Michel Herencia
- Area^{1}: 7.15 km^{2} (2.76 sq mi)
- Highest elevation: 259 m (850 ft)
- Lowest elevation: 194 m (636 ft)
- Population (2023): 334
  - Density: 46.7/km^{2} (121/sq mi)
- Time zone: UTC+01:00 (CET)
  - Summer (DST): UTC+02:00 (CEST)
- INSEE/Postal code: 57145 /57530
- ^{1} French Land Register data, which excludes lakes, ponds, glaciers > 1 km^{2} (0.386 sq mi or 247 acres) and river estuaries.

Coincy (French pronunciation: [kwɛ̃si]; German: Konzich) is a commune in the Moselle department in Grand Est in north-eastern France.

== See also ==
- Communes of the Moselle department
