= Château de Pierre-Percée =

Ruined castle in Meurthe-et-Moselle, France

Coordinates: 48°28′13″N 6°55′49″E

The Château de Pierre-Percée ('pierced rock castle') is a ruined castle found in the commune of Pierre-Percée in the département of Meurthe-et-Moselle, France.

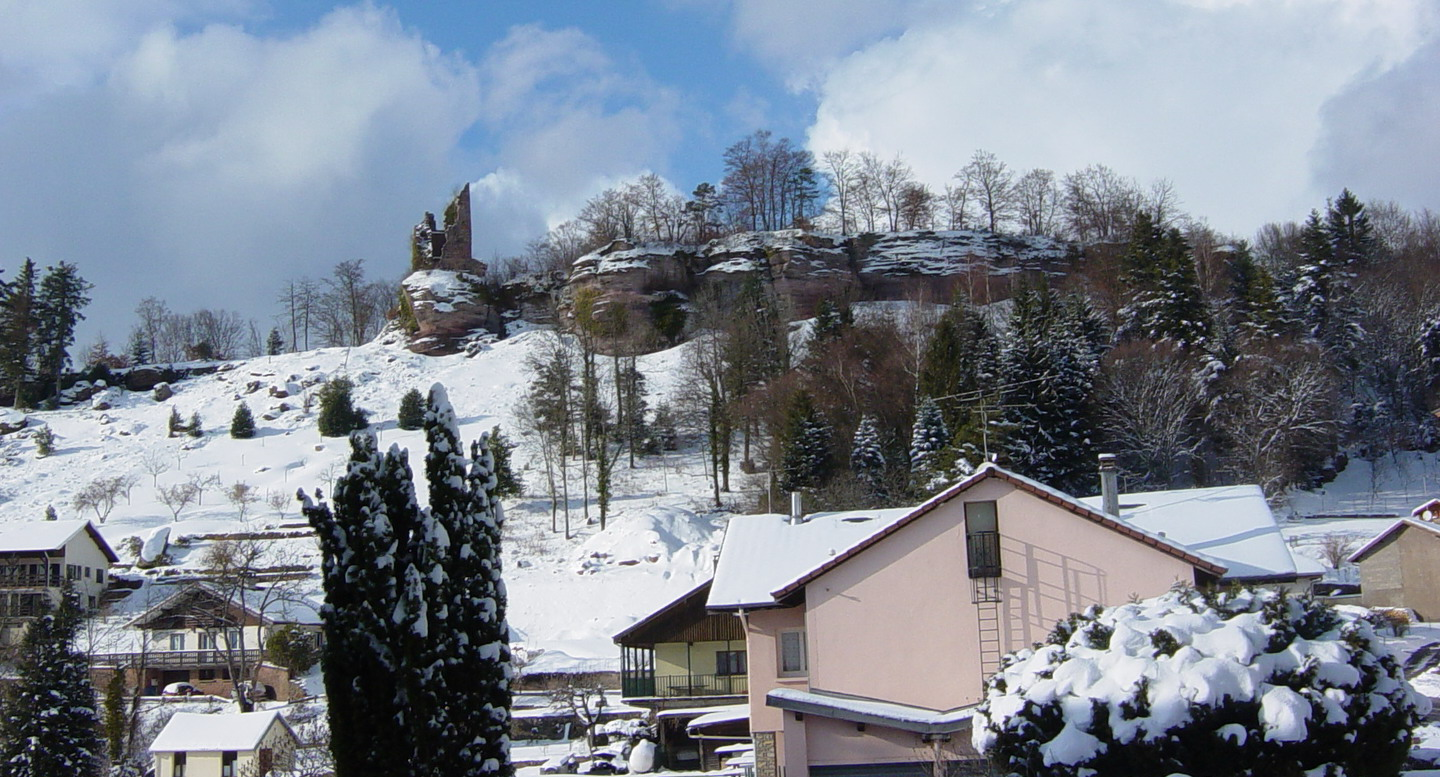
Château de Pierre-Percée

The site in the early 12th century was in possession of Agnès, countess of Bar and widow of the count of Langenstein. She married Hermann II, Count of Salm and son of Hermann I, King of Germania (Eastern Francia). A well dug 100 ft (~30 m) into the rock gives the village and the castle their name. The territory, which included the towns of Badonviller (which became the capital of the county) and Blâmont, became for several hundred years part of the hereditary property of the Counts of Salm. Around 1134, Hermann II went to war allied to the Duke of Lorraine against the Count of Bar and Stephan of Bar, the Bishop of Metz, himself a member of the Bar family. Hermann was killed on the battlefield outside the Château de Frouard. The castle at Pierre-Percée was besieged for a year and fell into the hands of the bishop of Metz with the death of Hermann's eldest son.

The castle was not besieged again until the Thirty Years' War (1618-1648) when, being deserted, it was destroyed by Franco-Swedish troops.

State property, the Château de Pierre-Percée is listed as a monument historique by the French Ministry of Culture.

== See also ==
- List of castles in France
