= Château de Cons-la-Grandville =

Castle in Lorraine, France

Coordinates: 49°29′1″N 5°42′3″E

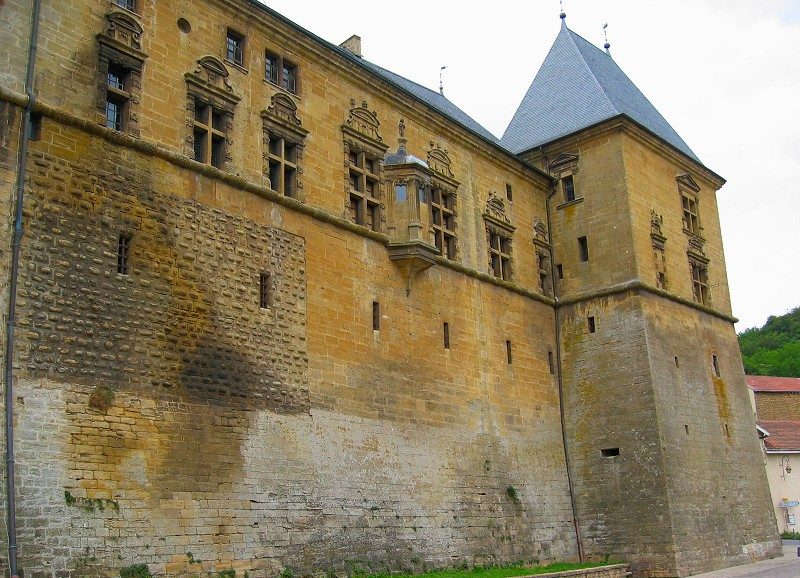
Château de Cons-la-Grandville, July 2004

The Château de Cons-la-Grandville is a castle situated in the commune of Cons-la-Grandville in the French département of Meurthe-et-Moselle.

== Description ==
The castle represents in a single building an architectural synthesis from the Romanesque to the Classical periods.

The first castle on the site was built at the end of the 11th century for Dudon de Cons. It was rebuilt before 1248 for Jacques de Cons: a round tower and part of the curtain wall remain from this period.

The present castle is built on the remains of the medieval castle, on a rocky promontory surrounded by the village and wooded hills. It was rebuilt for Martin de Custine using Pierre de Jaumont, a yellow limestone during the Renaissance, starting in 1572 (the north face has windows dated 1572, 1573, 1574, 1575).

The castle was partly reconstructed in the Classical style after the Thirty Years War. The north face was restored again in 1688 (the dates on the 9th and 10th windows provide evidence for this). Further rebuilding and modification took place in 1717, the 1730s and at the end of the 19th century.

The complex is completed with an 18th-century barn with rich woodwork in oak as well as a garden.

At the side of the castle is a Benedictine priory, reconstructed in the Classical period but built on a Romanesque style crypt from the 11th century, whose vaults are decorated with gothic frescoes dating from the 14th century.

Open to the public, the castle and its grounds have been restored since 1984. It was added to the inventory of national monuments (monument historique) in 1947 and has been classified since 1987.

== See also ==
- List of castles in France
