= Martincourt, Meurthe-et-Moselle =

Martincourt
- Commune
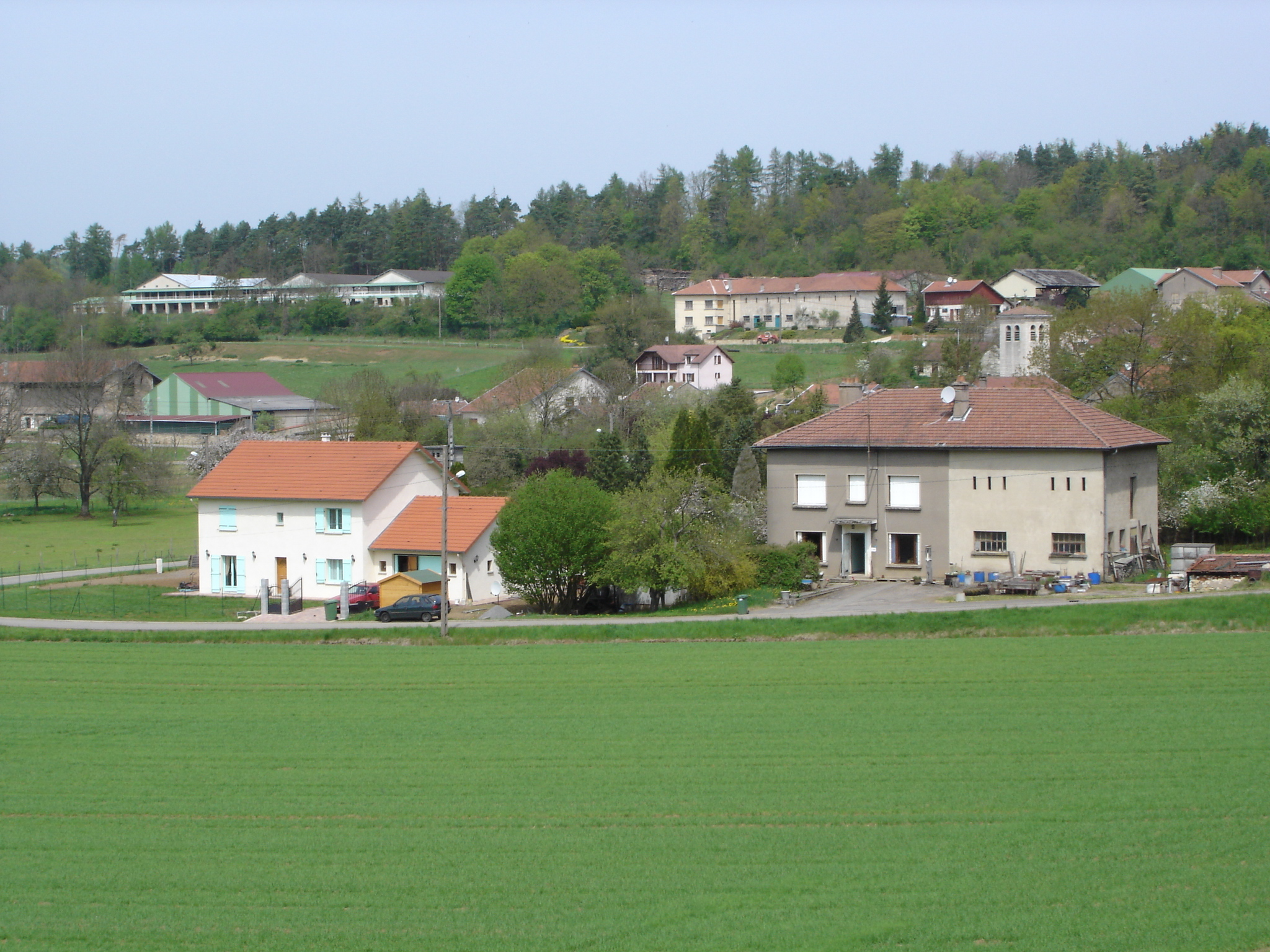
- A general view of Martincourt

- Coat of arms
- Location of Martincourt
- Location within France Location within Grand Est
- Coordinates: 48°50′51″N 5°56′50″E
- Country: France
- Region: Grand Est
- Department: Meurthe-et-Moselle
- Arrondissement: Nancy
- Canton: Le Nord-Toulois
- Intercommunality: CC du Bassin de Pont-à-Mousson

Government
  - Mayor (2020–2026): Patrice Poirel
- Area^{1}: 10.66 km^{2} (4.12 sq mi)
- Elevation: 217 m (712 ft)
- Highest elevation: 325 m (1,066 ft)
- Lowest elevation: 209 m (686 ft)
- Population (2023): 89
  - Density: 8.3/km^{2} (22/sq mi)
- Time zone: UTC+01:00 (CET)
  - Summer (DST): UTC+02:00 (CEST)
- INSEE/Postal code: 54355 /54380
- ^{1} French Land Register data, which excludes lakes, ponds, glaciers > 1 km^{2} (0.386 sq mi or 247 acres) and river estuaries.

Martincourt is a commune in the Meurthe-et-Moselle department in north-eastern France.

== Sights and monuments ==
- Château de Pierrefort - ruined 14th-century castle protected as a monument historique by the French Ministry of Culture

== See also ==
- Communes of the Meurthe-et-Moselle department
- Parc naturel régional de Lorraine
