= Rahling =

- Commune
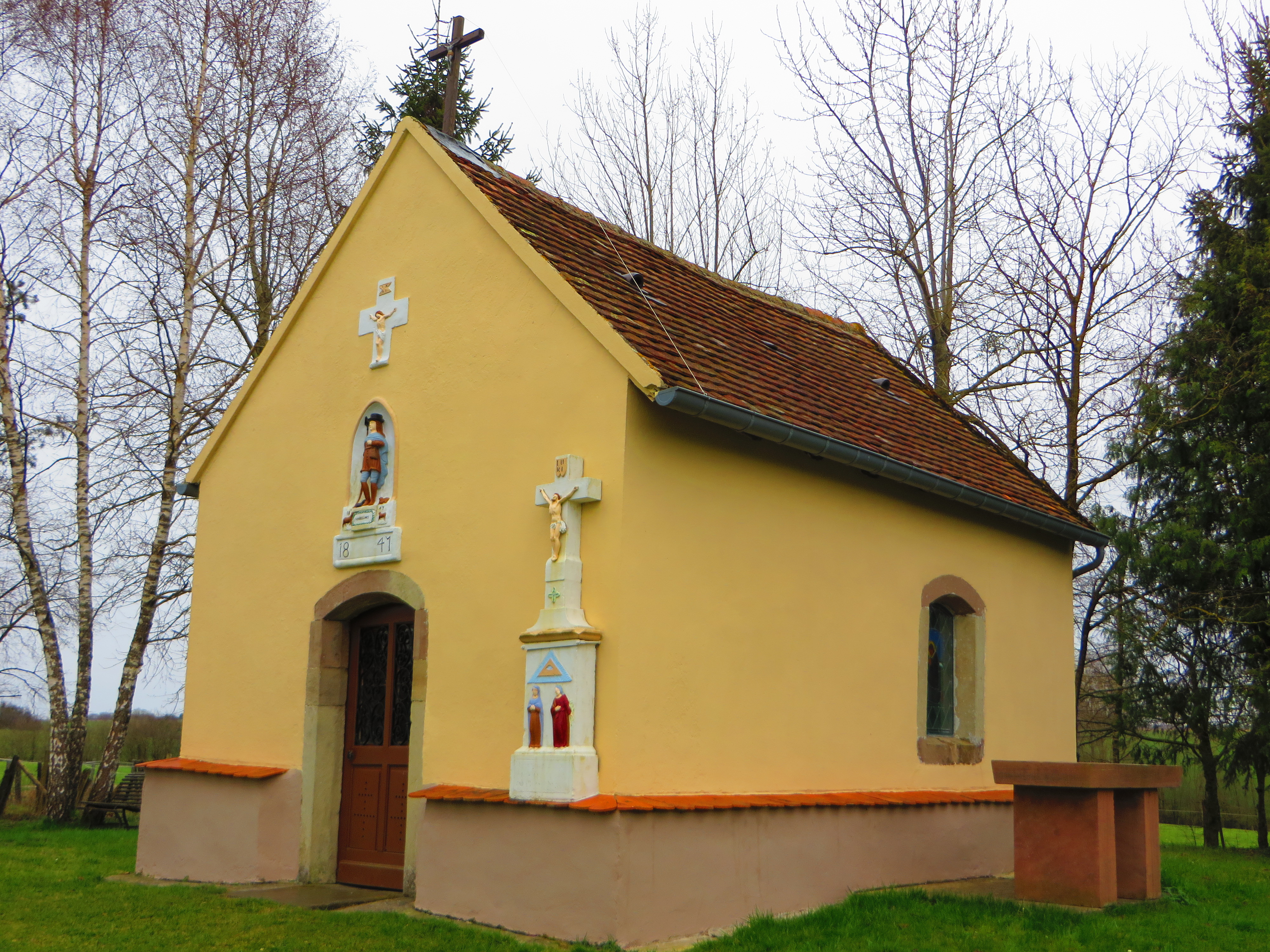
- The chapel in Rahling

- Coat of arms
- Location of Rahling
- Location within France Location within Grand Est
- Coordinates: 48°59′34″N 7°12′55″E
- Country: France
- Region: Grand Est
- Department: Moselle
- Arrondissement: Sarreguemines
- Canton: Bitche
- Intercommunality: CC du Pays de Bitche

Government
  - Mayor (2020–2026): Marie-Claude Bach
- Area^{1}: 21.3 km^{2} (8.2 sq mi)
- Elevation: 242 m (794 ft)
- Highest elevation: 366 m (1,201 ft)
- Lowest elevation: 234 m (768 ft)
- Population (2023): 707
  - Density: 33.2/km^{2} (86.0/sq mi)
- Time zone: UTC+01:00 (CET)
  - Summer (DST): UTC+02:00 (CEST)
- INSEE/Postal code: 57561 /57410
- ^{1} French Land Register data, which excludes lakes, ponds, glaciers > 1 km^{2} (0.386 sq mi or 247 acres) and river estuaries.

Rahling (French pronunciation: [ʁalɛ̃]; German: Rahlingen; Lorraine Franconian: Rahlinge) is a commune in the Moselle department of the Grand Est administrative region in north-eastern France.

The village belongs to the Pays de Bitche and to the Northern Vosges Regional Nature Park.

In 2010 the commune had 813 inhabitants (density: 38.2 people per km^{2}).

== See also ==
- Communes of the Moselle department
