= Pierre-Percée =

- Commune
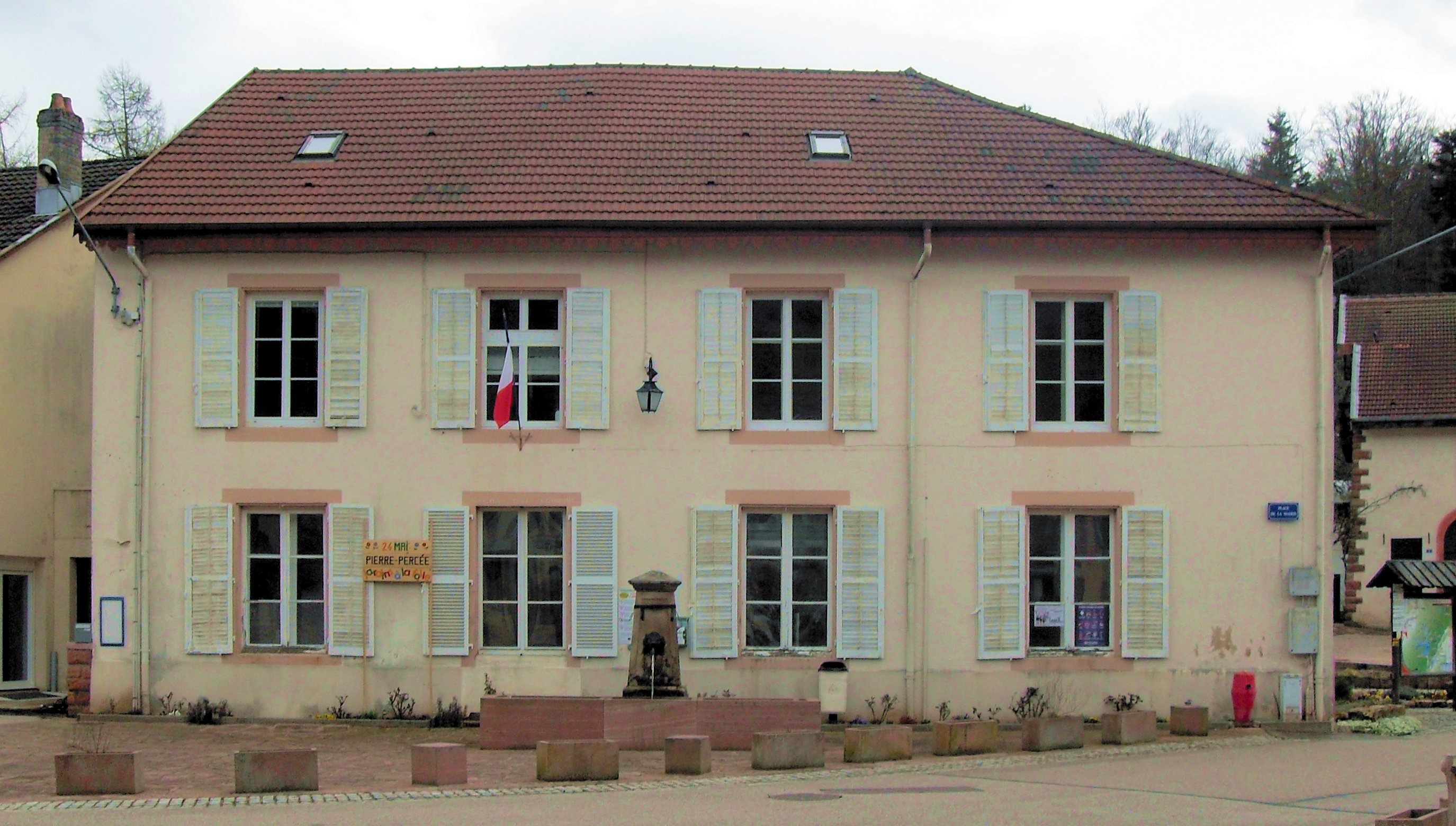
- The town hall in Pierre-Percée

- Coat of arms
- Location of Pierre-Percée
- Location within France Location within Grand Est
- Coordinates: 48°28′10″N 6°55′59″E
- Country: France
- Region: Grand Est
- Department: Meurthe-et-Moselle
- Arrondissement: Lunéville
- Canton: Baccarat
- Intercommunality: CA Saint-Dié-des-Vosges

Government
  - Mayor (2020–2026): Denis Guyon
- Area^{1}: 9.93 km^{2} (3.83 sq mi)
- Highest elevation: 2,570 m (8,430 ft)
- Lowest elevation: 301 m (988 ft)
- Population (2023): 90
  - Density: 9.1/km^{2} (23/sq mi)
- Time zone: UTC+01:00 (CET)
  - Summer (DST): UTC+02:00 (CEST)
- INSEE/Postal code: 54427 /54540
- ^{1} French Land Register data, which excludes lakes, ponds, glaciers > 1 km^{2} (0.386 sq mi or 247 acres) and river estuaries.

Pierre-Percée (French pronunciation: [pjɛʁ pɛʁse]) is a commune in the Meurthe-et-Moselle department in north-eastern France.

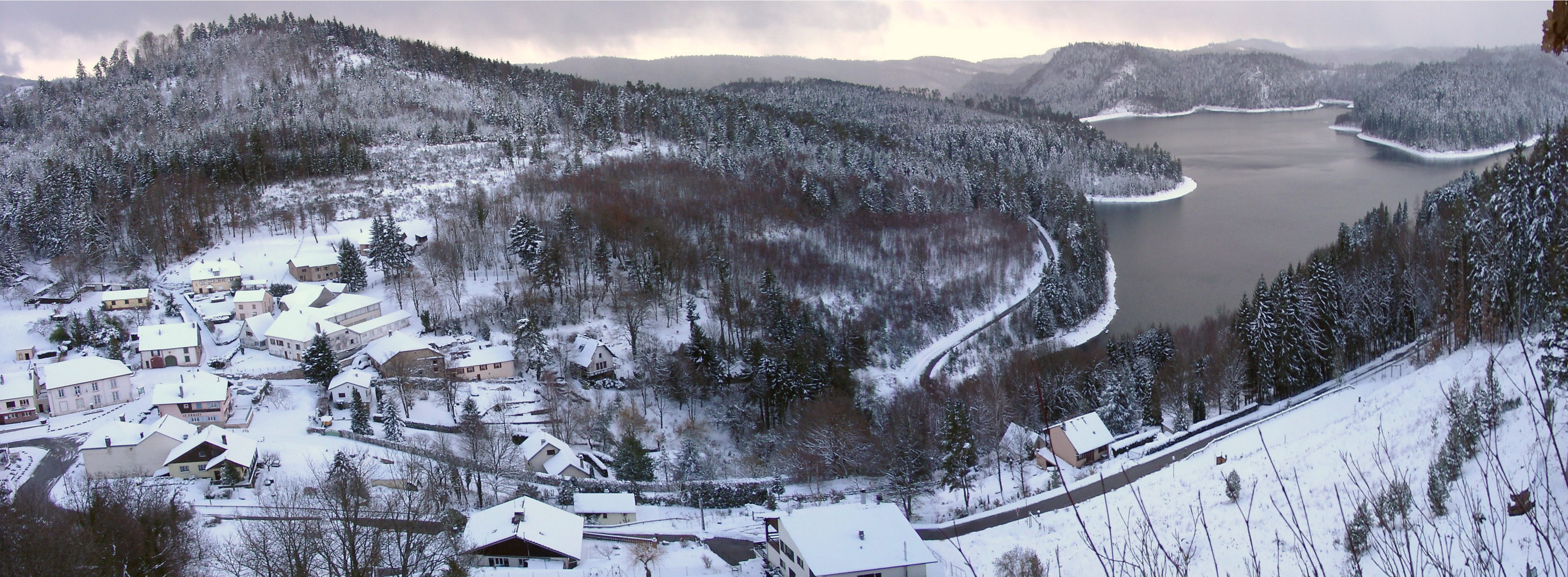
Pierre-Percée and Vieux Pré lake

== Sites and monuments ==
- Château de Pierre-Percée ruins
- Lake of Pierre-Percée

== See also ==
- Communes of the Meurthe-et-Moselle department
- Antoine Sartorio
