= Bulligny =

- Commune
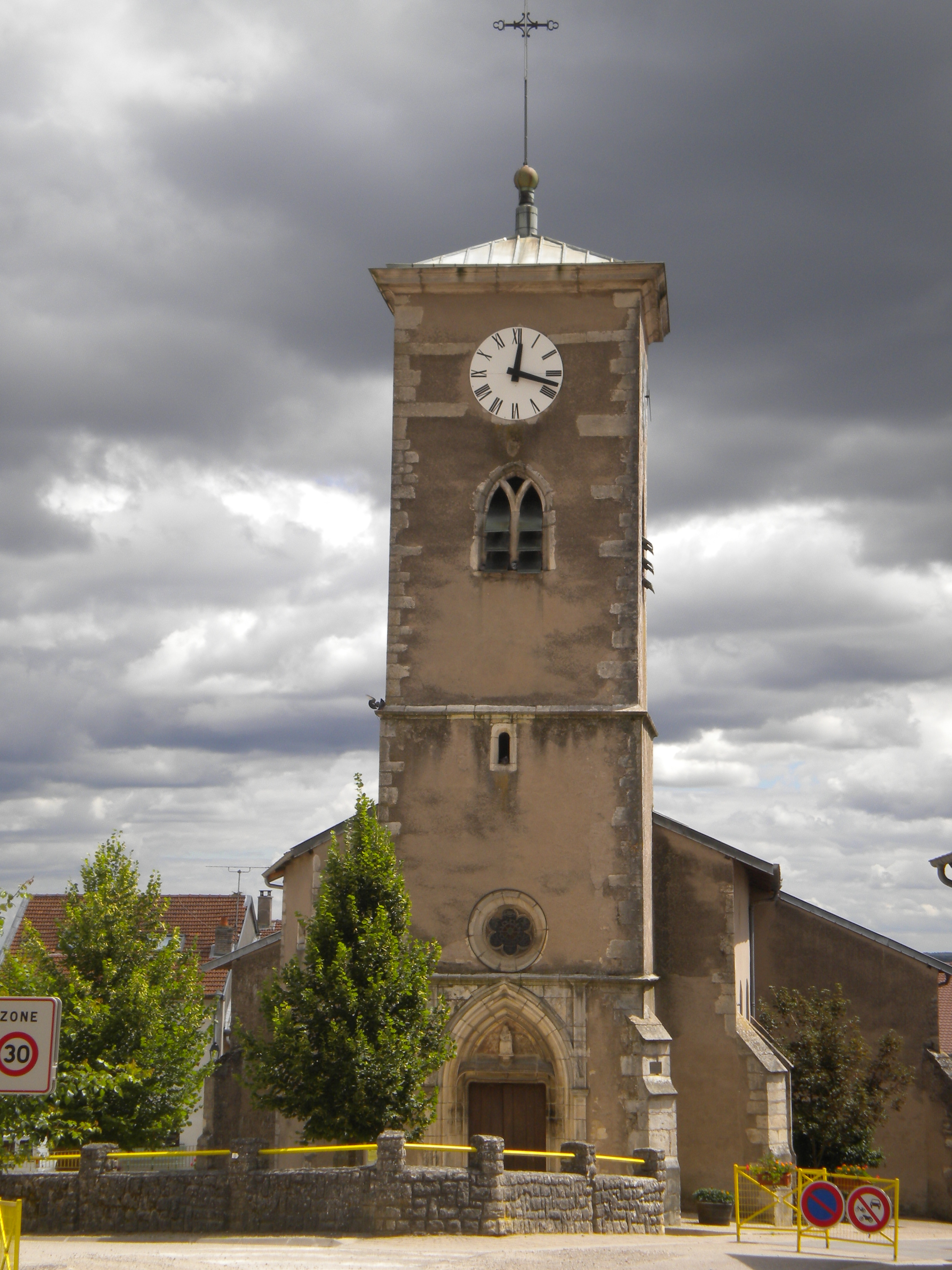
- The church in Bulligny

- Coat of arms
- Location of Bulligny
- Location within France Location within Grand Est
- Coordinates: 48°34′40″N 5°51′03″E
- Country: France
- Region: Grand Est
- Department: Meurthe-et-Moselle
- Arrondissement: Toul
- Canton: Meine au Saintois
- Intercommunality: CC Pays de Colombey et Sud Toulois

Government
  - Mayor (2020–2026): Alain Gris
- Area^{1}: 10.49 km^{2} (4.05 sq mi)
- Elevation: 280 m (920 ft)
- Highest elevation: 425 m (1,394 ft)
- Lowest elevation: 249 m (817 ft)
- Population (2023): 538
  - Density: 51.3/km^{2} (133/sq mi)
- Time zone: UTC+01:00 (CET)
  - Summer (DST): UTC+02:00 (CEST)
- INSEE/Postal code: 54105 /54113
- ^{1} French Land Register data, which excludes lakes, ponds, glaciers > 1 km^{2} (0.386 sq mi or 247 acres) and river estuaries.

Bulligny (French pronunciation: [byliɲi]) is a commune in the Meurthe-et-Moselle department in northeastern France.

== Population ==
Historical population
Year	Pop.	±% p.a.
1968	461	—
1975	423	−1.22%
1982	458	+1.14%
1990	459	+0.03%
1999	462	+0.07%
2007	510	+1.24%
2012	479	−1.25%
2017	531	+2.08%
2023	538	+0.22%
Source: INSEE

== See also ==
- Communes of the Meurthe-et-Moselle department
