= Fléville-devant-Nancy =

- Commune
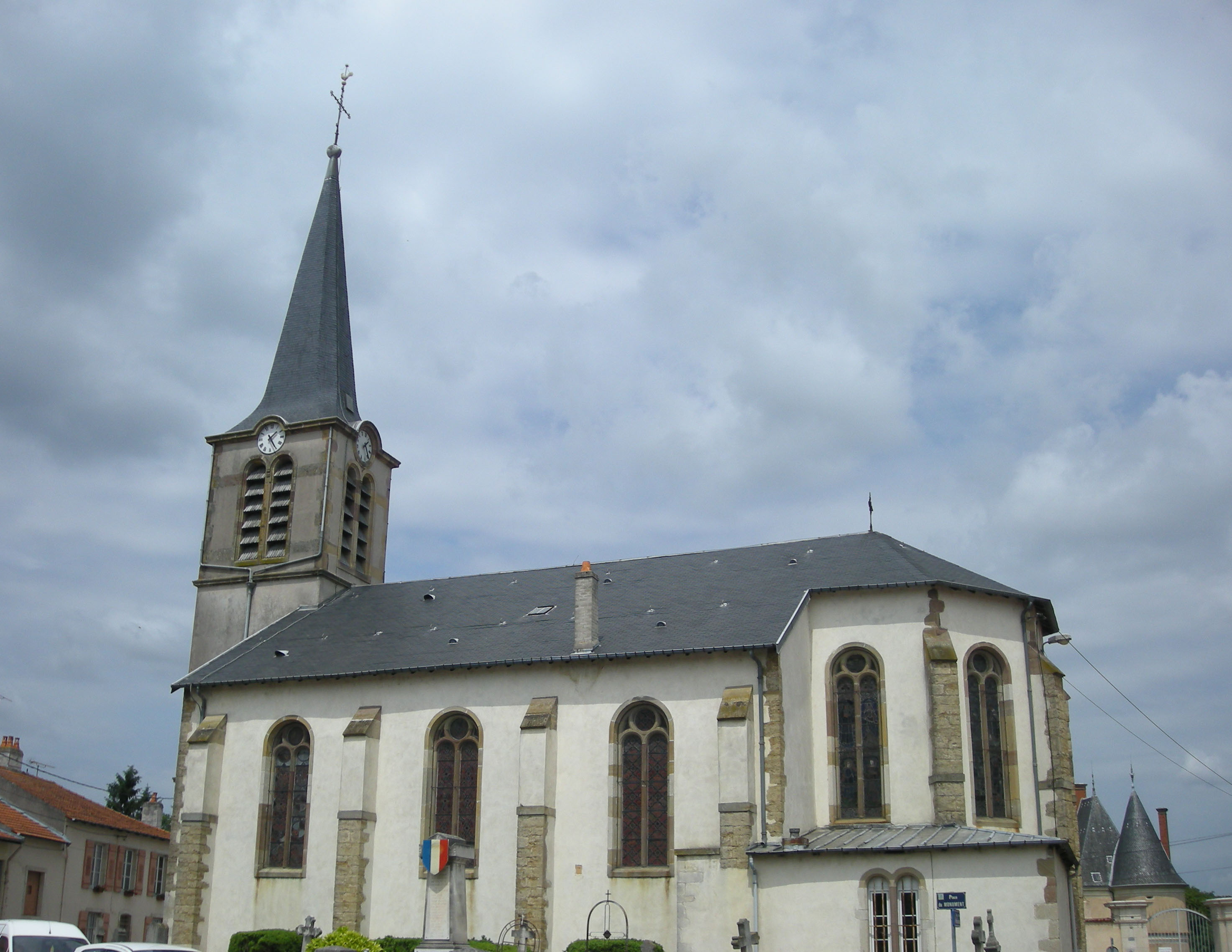
- The church of Fléville-devant-Nancy

- Coat of arms
- Location of Fléville-devant-Nancy
- Location within France Location within Grand Est
- Coordinates: 48°37′33″N 6°12′15″E
- Country: France
- Region: Grand Est
- Department: Meurthe-et-Moselle
- Arrondissement: Nancy
- Canton: Jarville-la-Malgrange
- Intercommunality: Métropole du Grand Nancy

Government
  - Mayor (2020–2026): Alain Boulanger
- Area^{1}: 7.40 km^{2} (2.86 sq mi)
- Elevation: 220 m (720 ft)
- Highest elevation: 281 m (922 ft)
- Lowest elevation: 206 m (676 ft)
- Population (2023): 2,171
  - Density: 293/km^{2} (760/sq mi)
- Time zone: UTC+01:00 (CET)
  - Summer (DST): UTC+02:00 (CEST)
- INSEE/Postal code: 54197 /54710
- ^{1} French Land Register data, which excludes lakes, ponds, glaciers > 1 km^{2} (0.386 sq mi or 247 acres) and river estuaries.

Fléville-devant-Nancy (French pronunciation: [flevil dəvɑ̃ nɑ̃si], literally Fléville before Nancy) is a commune in the Meurthe-et-Moselle department in north-eastern France.

== Population ==
Historical population
Year	Pop.	±% p.a.
1968	323	—
1975	1,578	+25.43%
1982	2,009	+3.51%
1990	2,751	+4.01%
1999	2,624	−0.52%
2007	2,416	−1.03%
2012	2,347	−0.58%
2017	2,263	−0.73%
2023	2,171	−0.69%
Source: INSEE

== See also ==
- Communes of the Meurthe-et-Moselle department
