= Ville-sur-Saulx =

- Commune
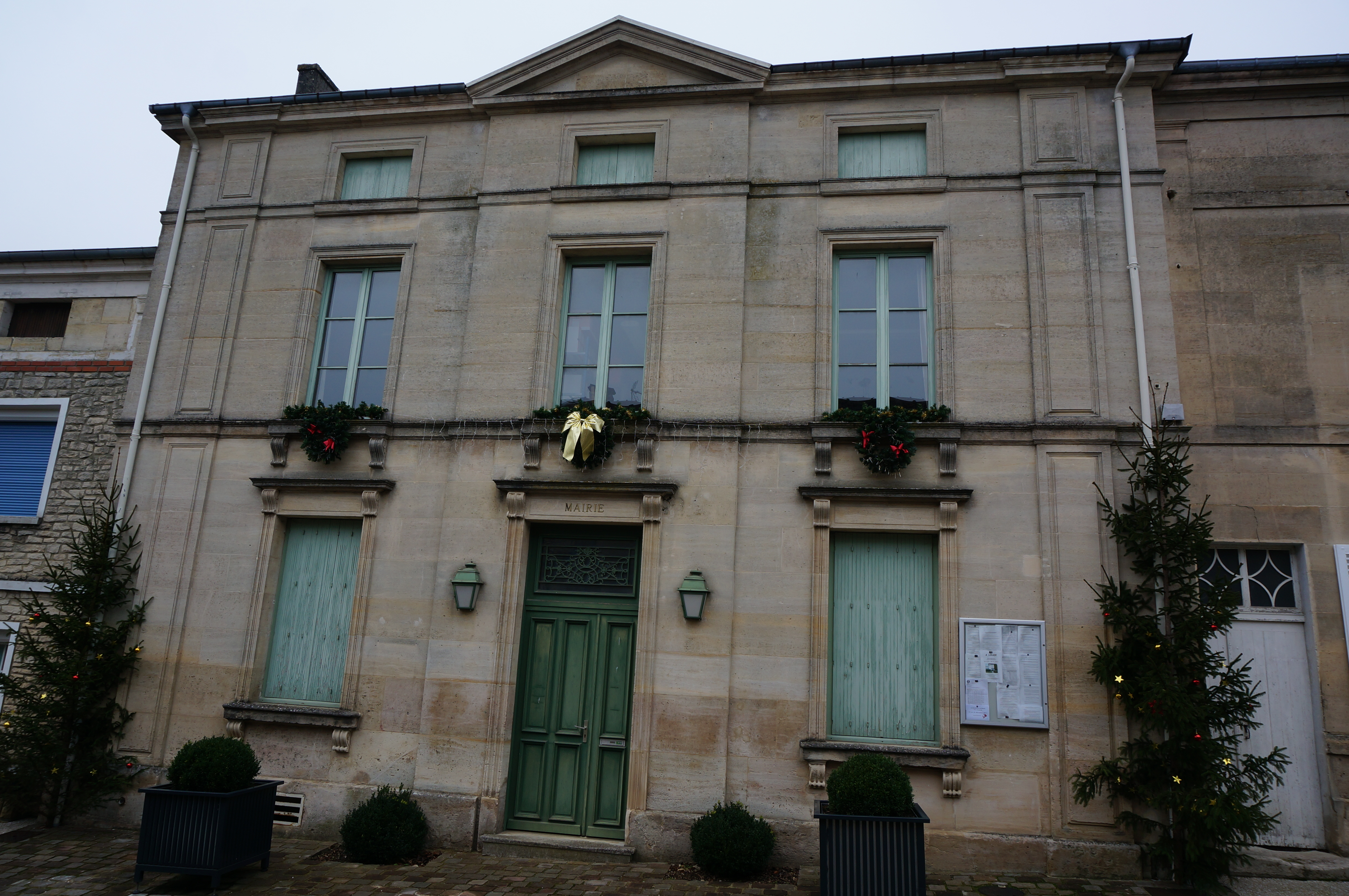
- The town hall in Ville-sur-Saulx

- Coat of arms
- Location of Ville-sur-Saulx
- Location within France Location within Grand Est
- Coordinates: 48°42′50″N 5°03′36″E
- Country: France
- Region: Grand Est
- Department: Meuse
- Arrondissement: Bar-le-Duc
- Canton: Ancerville
- Intercommunality: CC Portes de Meuse

Government
  - Mayor (2020–2026): Didier Ménétrier
- Area^{1}: 4.07 km^{2} (1.57 sq mi)
- Elevation: 160 m (520 ft)
- Highest elevation: 242 m (794 ft)
- Lowest elevation: 172 m (564 ft)
- Population (2023): 276
  - Density: 67.8/km^{2} (176/sq mi)
- Time zone: UTC+01:00 (CET)
  - Summer (DST): UTC+02:00 (CEST)
- INSEE/Postal code: 55568 /55000
- ^{1} French Land Register data, which excludes lakes, ponds, glaciers > 1 km^{2} (0.386 sq mi or 247 acres) and river estuaries.

Ville-sur-Saulx (French pronunciation: [vil syʁ so], literally Ville on Saulx) is a commune in the Meuse department in Grand Est in north-eastern France.

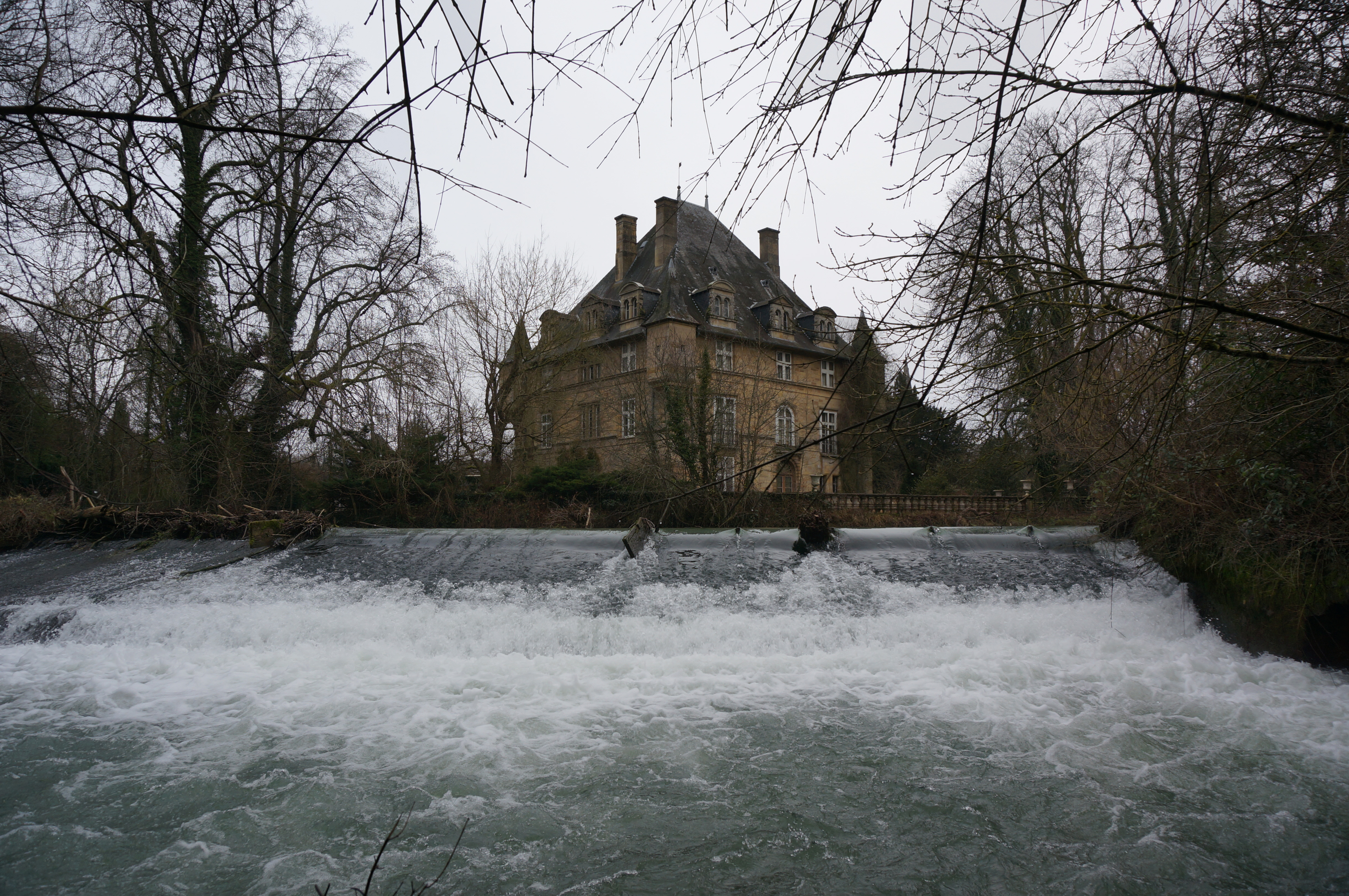
Château de Trêves.

== See also ==
- Communes of the Meuse department
