= Azoudange =

- Commune
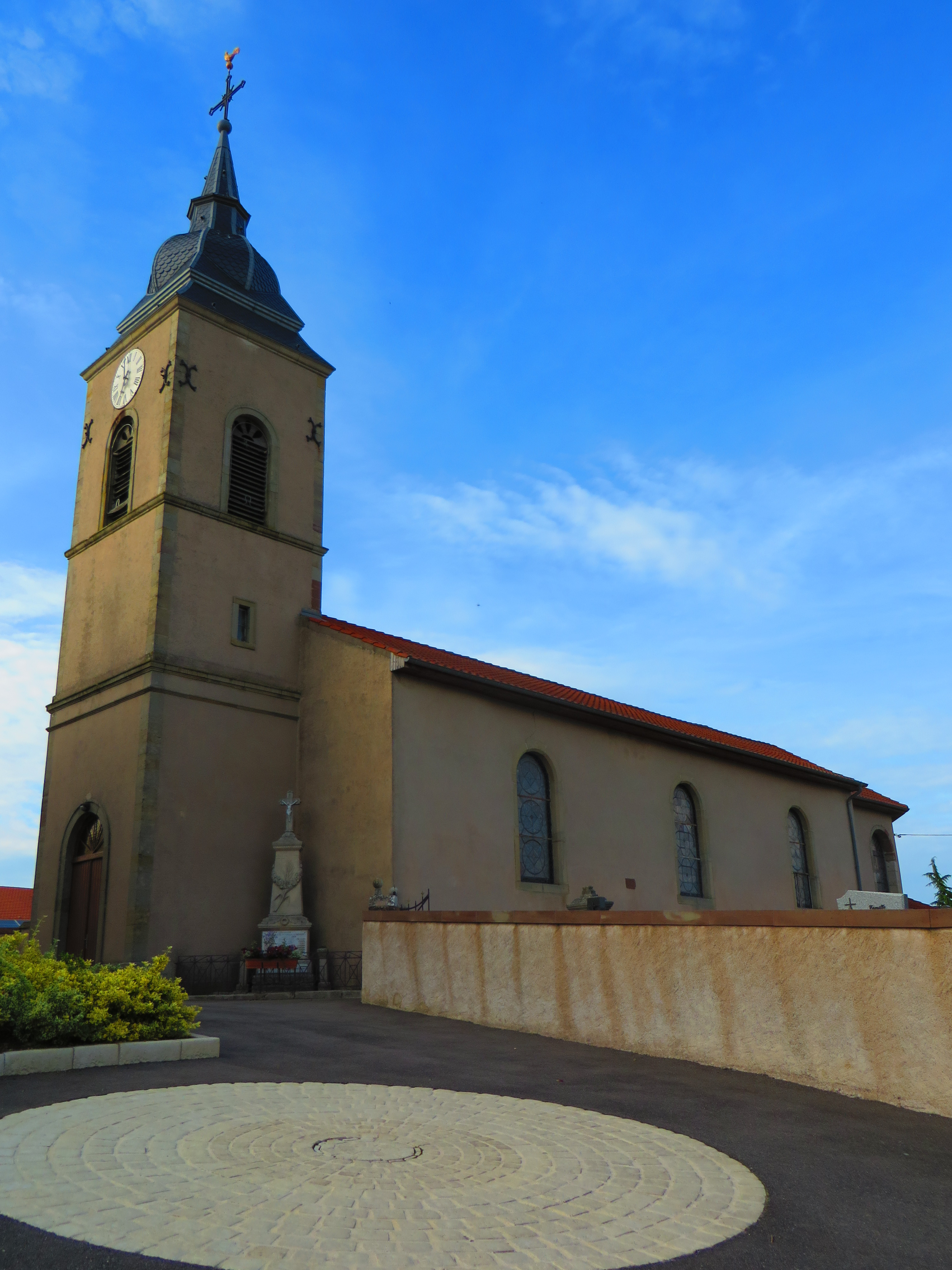
- The church in Azoudange

- Coat of arms
- Location of Azoudange
- Location within France Location within Grand Est
- Coordinates: 48°44′24″N 6°48′46″E
- Country: France
- Region: Grand Est
- Department: Moselle
- Arrondissement: Sarrebourg-Château-Salins
- Canton: Sarrebourg
- Intercommunality: Sarrebourg - Moselle Sud

Government
  - Mayor (2020–2026): Marc Bartel
- Area^{1}: 15.73 km^{2} (6.07 sq mi)
- Elevation: 243 m (797 ft)
- Highest elevation: 302 m (991 ft)
- Lowest elevation: 217 m (712 ft)
- Population (2023): 89
  - Density: 5.7/km^{2} (15/sq mi)
- Time zone: UTC+01:00 (CET)
  - Summer (DST): UTC+02:00 (CEST)
- INSEE/Postal code: 57044 /57810
- ^{1} French Land Register data, which excludes lakes, ponds, glaciers > 1 km^{2} (0.386 sq mi or 247 acres) and river estuaries.

Azoudange (French pronunciation: [azudɑ̃ʒ]; German: Anslingen) is a commune in the Moselle department in Grand Est in northeastern France.

== Population ==
Historical population
Year	Pop.	±% p.a.
1968	182	—
1975	154	−2.36%
1982	123	−3.16%
1990	103	−2.19%
1999	106	+0.32%
2007	114	+0.91%
2012	117	+0.52%
2017	118	+0.17%
2023	89	−4.59%
Source: INSEE

== See also ==
- Communes of the Moselle department
- Parc naturel régional de Lorraine
