= Thillombois =

- Commune
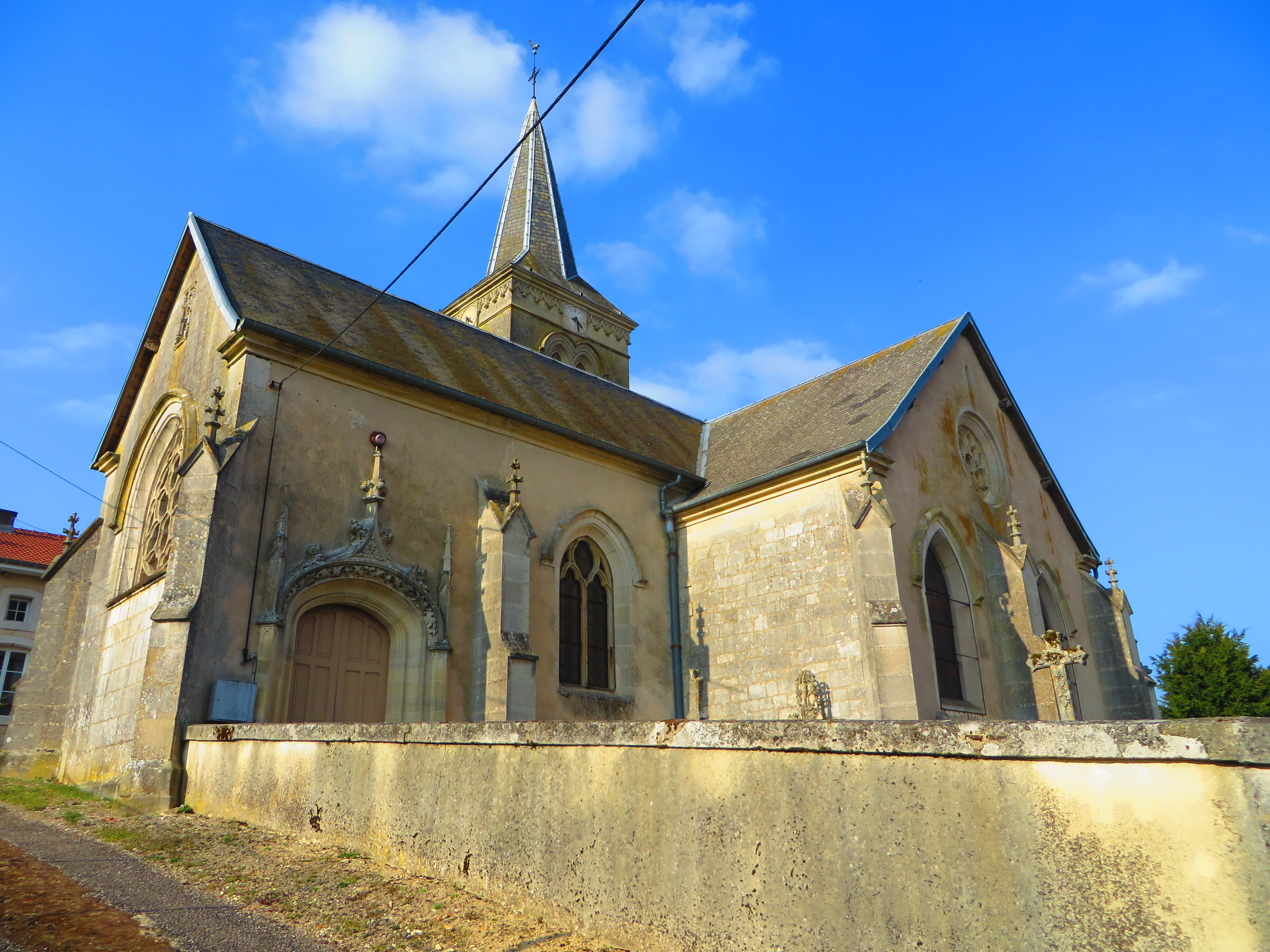
- The church in Thillombois

- Coat of arms
- Location of Thillombois
- Location within France Location within Grand Est
- Coordinates: 48°57′27″N 5°24′02″E
- Country: France
- Region: Grand Est
- Department: Meuse
- Arrondissement: Commercy
- Canton: Dieue-sur-Meuse
- Intercommunality: CC de l'Aire à l'Argonne

Government
  - Mayor (2020–2026): Jean-Marie Huraut
- Area^{1}: 13.03 km^{2} (5.03 sq mi)
- Elevation: 246 m (807 ft)
- Highest elevation: 352 m (1,155 ft)
- Lowest elevation: 234 m (768 ft)
- Population (2023): 28
  - Density: 2.1/km^{2} (5.6/sq mi)
- Time zone: UTC+01:00 (CET)
  - Summer (DST): UTC+02:00 (CEST)
- INSEE/Postal code: 55506 /55260
- ^{1} French Land Register data, which excludes lakes, ponds, glaciers > 1 km^{2} (0.386 sq mi or 247 acres) and river estuaries.

Thillombois (French pronunciation: [tijɔ̃bwa]) is a commune in the Meuse department in Grand Est in north-eastern France.

== See also ==
- Communes of the Meuse department
