= Mining in France =

Mining industry in France

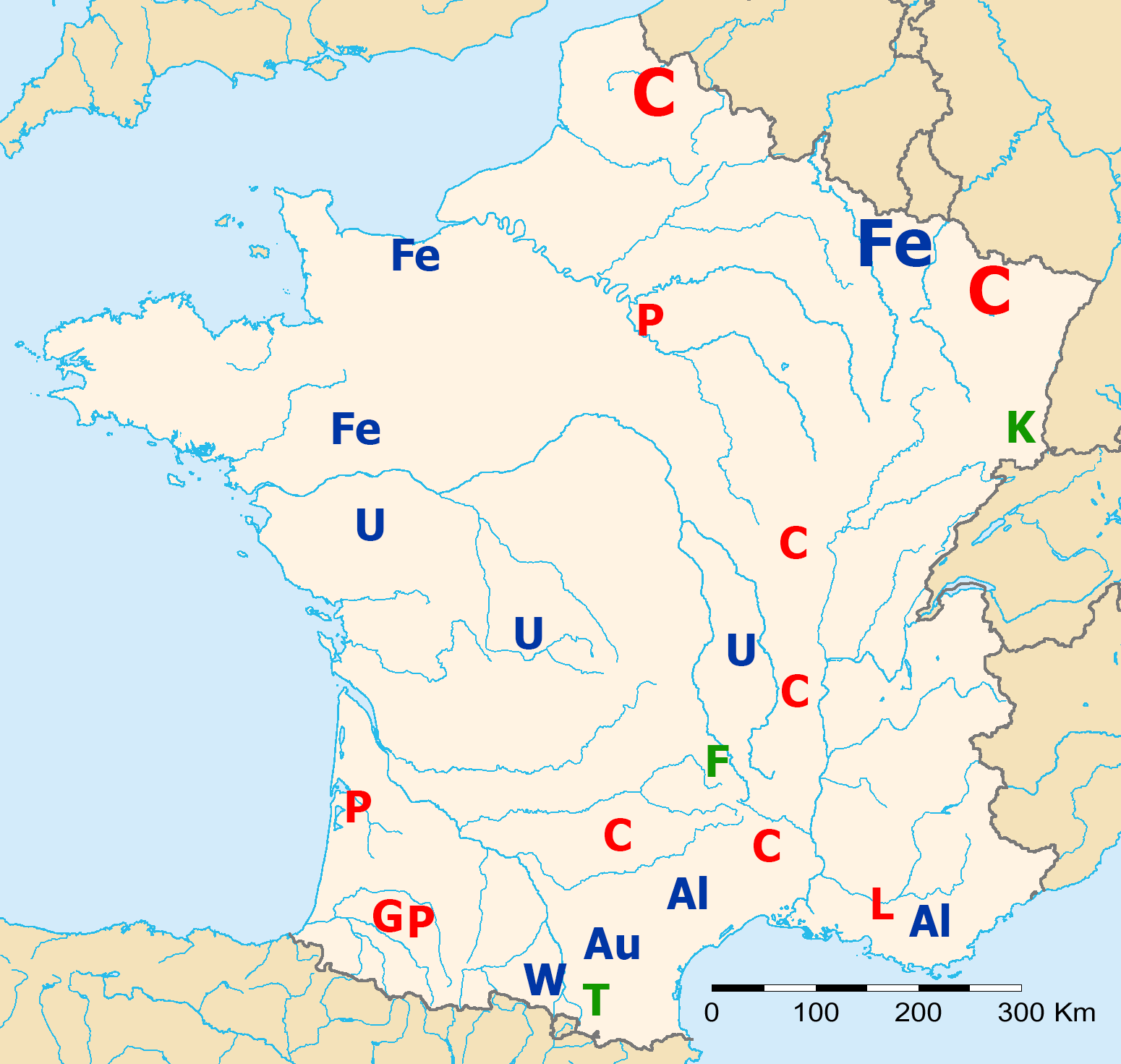
Natural resources of France: Al – Aluminium, Fe – Iron, W – Tungsten, Au – Gold, U – Uranium, C – Coal, L – Lignite, P – Petroleum, G – Natural gas, F – Fluorine, K – Potash, T – Talc.

Mining in France is based solely on the nature of the material, whether extracted from the surface or underground. These include fuels (coal, hydrocarbons, gas), metals (iron, copper) and a few other minerals (salt, sulfur).

The inventory of mining resources is relatively well known for surface and subsurface deposits. It is less well known for deep-seated resources, and needs to be regularly updated to take into account the discovery of new resources and the depletion of certain deposits.

Products not included in the list of mines are referred to as quarries, and include building materials such as sand, clay, gypsum and limestone. They are subject to ICPE (installations classées pour la protection de l'environnement) legislation.

While, under the French Civil Code, the subsoil belongs to the owner of the soil, the management of the mining subsoil is the responsibility of the State, which may grant a concession to a mining company.

Mining always leaves its mark on the environment and human health, particularly when it comes to metal and metalloid deposits, and especially in naturally acidic regions prone to runoff, and even more so in the case of acid mine drainage.

Major mines and deposits also exist overseas, including in French Guiana and New Caledonia.

== The history of French mining ==
Like the United Kingdom and Germany, France drew on its vast fossil fuel resources (especially coal), which in the 19th and 20th centuries enabled its industrial and commercial development, in particular thanks to the coal-iron pairing that made the Industrial Revolution possible. This was followed by the construction of Europe (the Coal and Steel Community), but ended in a major industrial crisis in the 1970s and 1980s, with the rapid closure of pits and mines following the exhaustion of resources that could be exploited at reasonable cost and in the face of competition from other countries.

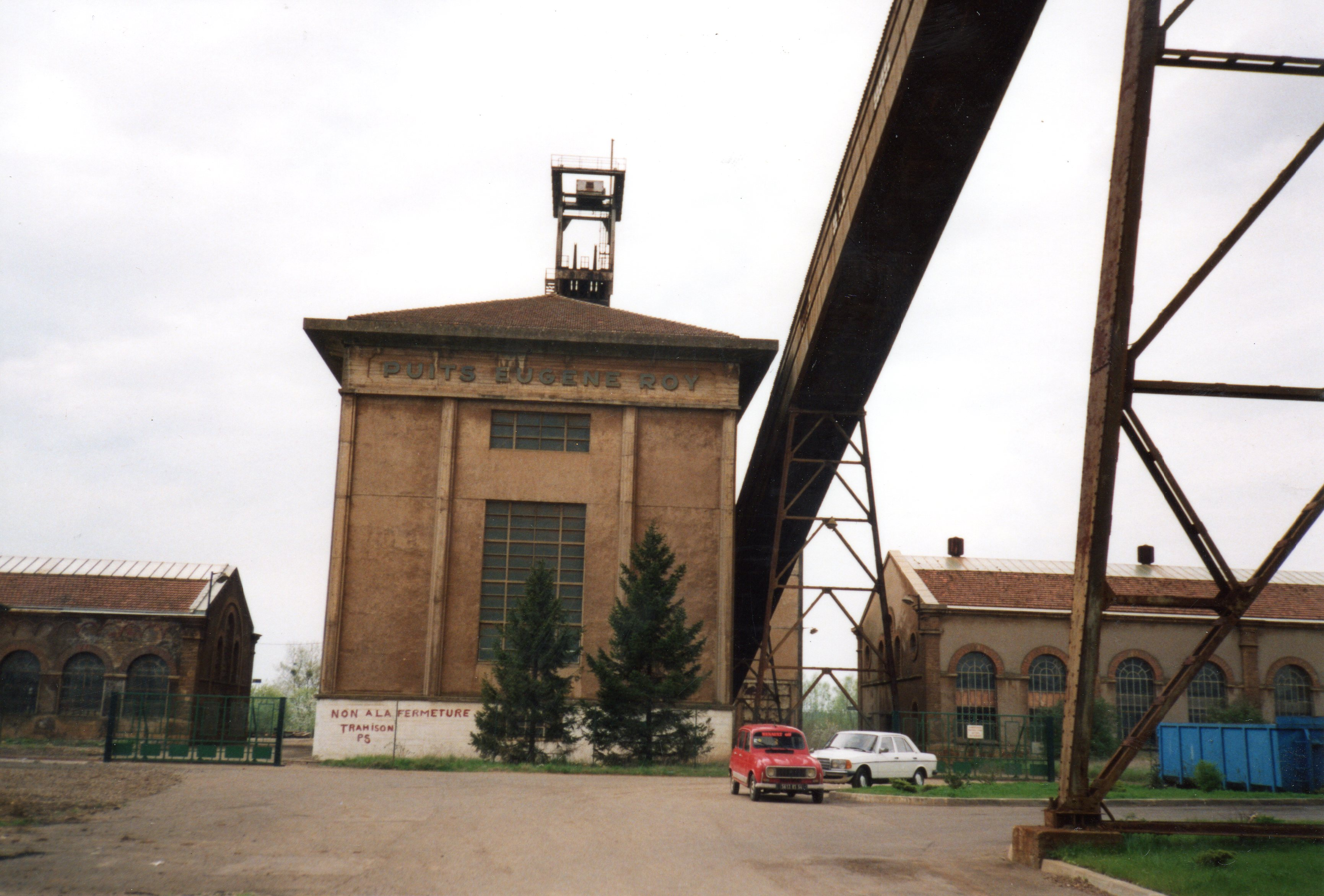
Former shaft of the Tucquegnieux iron mine in Meurthe-et-Moselle, shortly after it was shut down, now dismantled (Eugène Roy shaft).

These products are fuels (coal and lignite), ores (iron, lead, zinc, some antimony, manganese, copper, etc.) and industrial substances (salt, potash, oil shale, fluorite, uranium, etc.).

Contrary to popular belief, France has never been self-sufficient in either fuel or minerals, except for a few years in the case of iron ore. In particular, it has always had to import its coal, even in the 1960s, when production reached its maximum capacity.

In general, the development of the mining industry is subject to many vagaries: expansion or recession of the industry, variations in raw material prices, environmental pressures, etc. This is one of the reasons why the industry remains highly irregular. It is not uncommon, for example, for a mine to close just after it has begun operating. For example, following a fall in stock market prices. Then again, it may reopen many years later, or close again (repeatedly). We must also take into account geological hazards, not always discernible at the time of research. For example, it has often been the case that a mine on which hopes were pinned quickly proved to be inoperable due to numerous faults (major water infiltrations, firedamp, etc.). Last but not least, technological progress has also played a role: phosphorus-bearing mines in Lorraine, which were unusable before the invention of Bessemer steels, have now proved unsuitable for hematite casting.

While a mine, like a quarry, is by definition ephemeral, certain environmental after-effects can last for centuries or millennia after closure (acid mine drainage or neutral mine drainage, for example, sometimes combined with mine subsidence and then rising groundwater in a subsoil destructured by mining, particularly in the iron and coal mines of Eastern France (Lorraine) and the Nord-Pas-de-Calais coalfield.

=== Overseas ===
Nickel is mined in New Caledonia. Gold deposits are mined in French Guiana.

=== Coal and lignite ===
Location of French coalfields.

The mining of coal (as opposed to charcoal) dates back at least as far as the Middle Ages, but underwent significant development at the end of the 18th century and especially during the Industrial Revolution in the second half of the 19th century. Despite its wealth, France has never been self-sufficient in coal, and even at the peak of production in the 1960s, it always imported foreign coal (from Belgium, the UK, Germany, the Soviet Union, Poland, etc.).

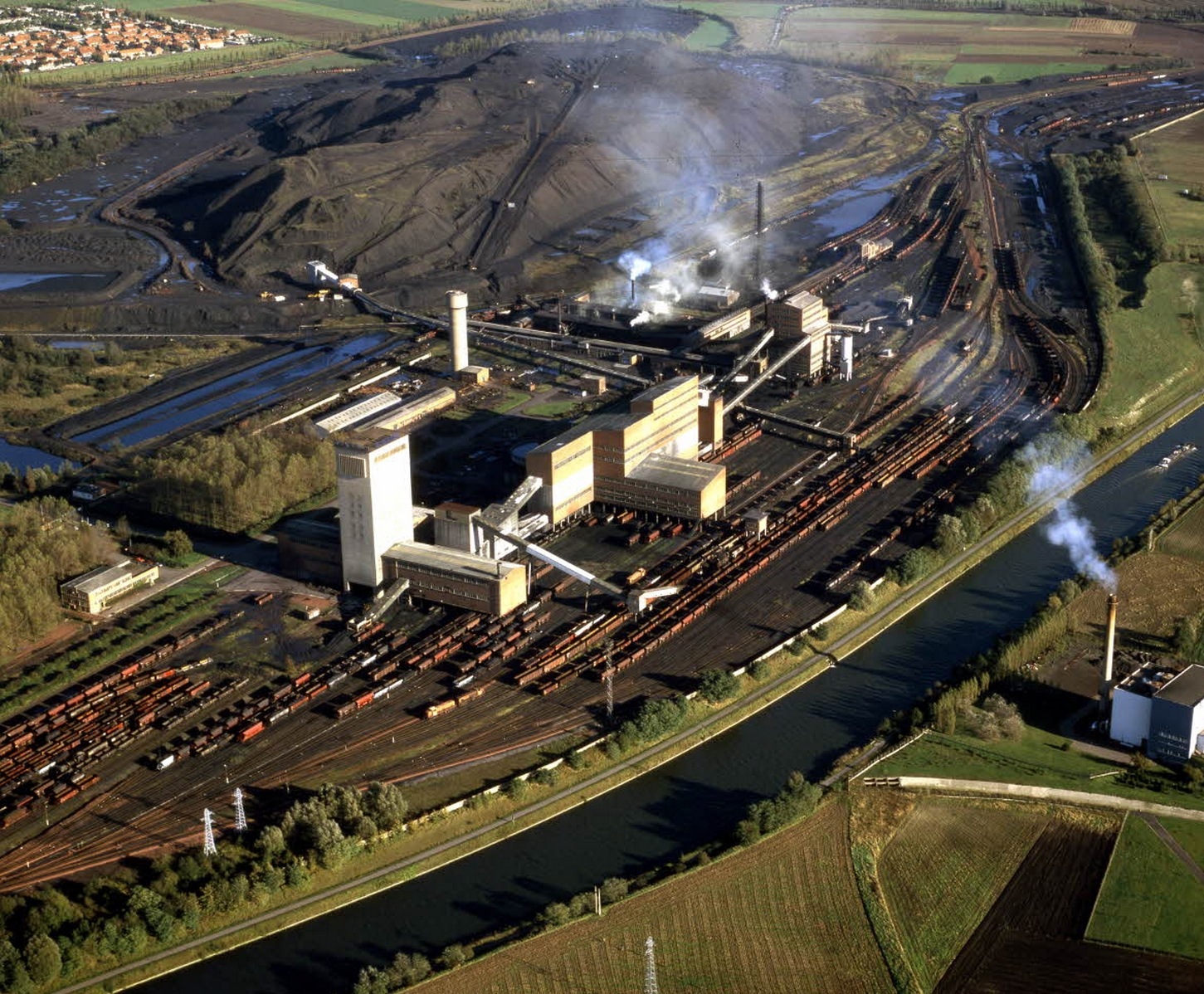
Pit no. 10 of the Oignies Group.

Coal mining was nationalized by Law no. 46-1072 of May 17, 1946, which created the Établissement public Charbonnages de France, and its implementing decrees, which created the various Houillères de bassin (Houillères Nord-Pas-de-Calais, Houillères de Lorraine, Houillères d'Auvergne, Houillères de la Loire, Houillères de Blanzy, Houillères du Dauphiné, Houillères de Provence, Houillères d'Aquitaine and Houillères des Cévennes). But more than 200 small operations escaped nationalization, the main ones being Faymoreau (Vendée), mines de Lavaveix, (Creuse), Manosque-Bois d'Asson (Basses-Alpes), le bassin du Briançonnais (Hautes-Alpes), and so on. The last private mine in France (Cruéjouls in Aveyron) closed in 1988. The Ronchamp coal mines (Haute-Saône) were an exception, as they were handed over to EDF in 1946.

The decree of April 16, 1968, transferred the assets of the various coal mines in central and southern France: Auvergne, Loire, Provence, Dauphiné, Blanzy, Cévennes and Aquitaine to Houillères du Bassin du Centre et du Midi (HBCM), although Houillères de Bassin Nord-Pas-de-Calais (HBNPC) and Houillères de Lorraine (HBL) were retained. All French coalfields are listed in the article Mines de charbon de France.

=== Iron ore ===
France has exploited numerous iron ore mines from prehistoric times to the end of the 20th century.

==== Lorraine ====
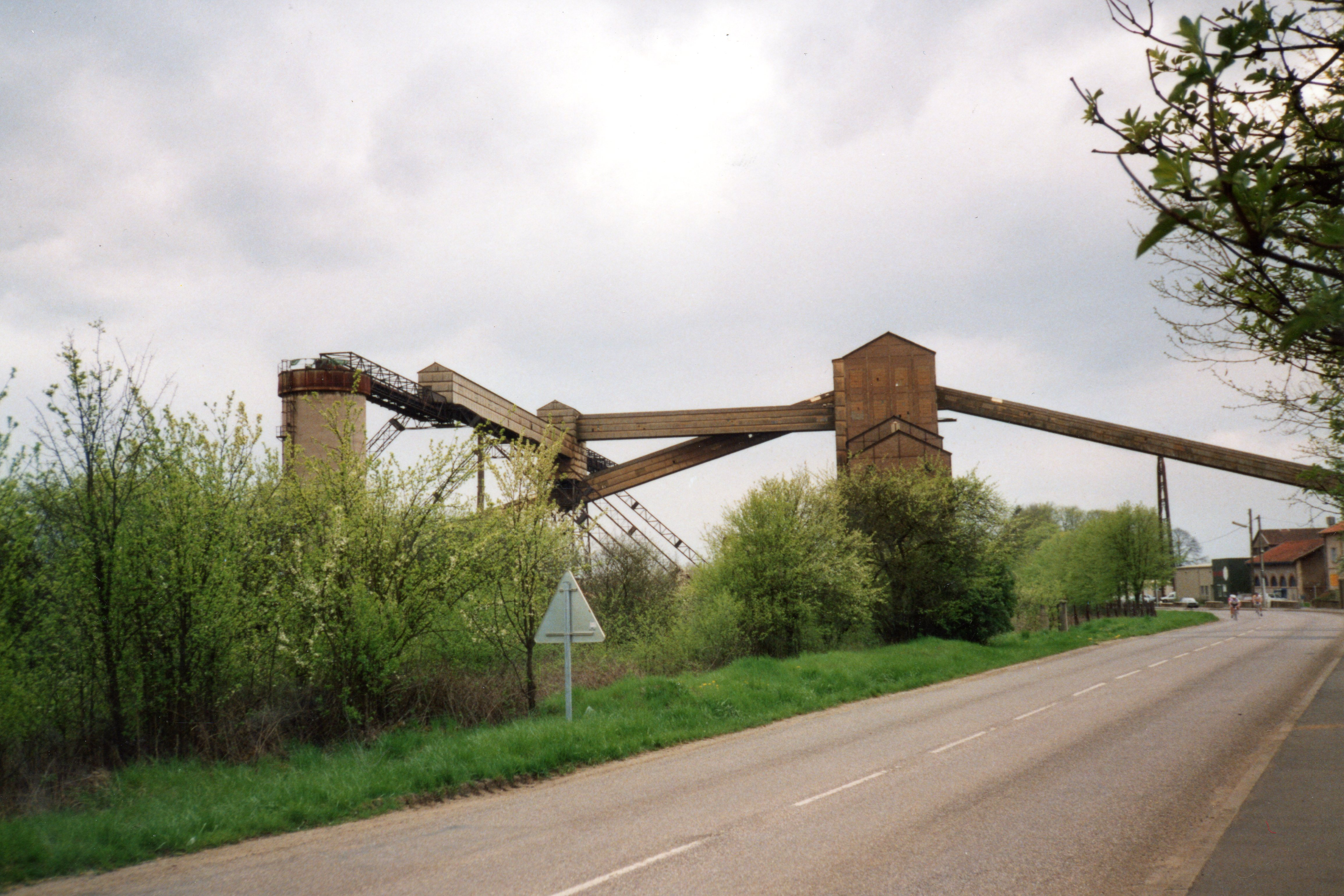
Tucquegnieux iron mine: The headframe as it looked in the late 1980s.

Ore of the same name has been mined in Lorraine since the Iron Age. Numerous archaeological traces attest to this. Most of the Lorraine iron basin is closely linked to the de Wendel family, who exploited most of the mines in the north of the region (Neufchef and Aumetz mines, Auboué mines, etc.) and used them for their steel mills. In fact, the presence of iron in local rocks (Pierre de Jaumont) gives it an ochre hue.

Lorraine boasts three iron mining ecomuseums, each presenting a complementary history of iron mining in the region. Through guided tours, you can discover the human adventure of the gueules jaunes and the mining of minette in Lorraine.

- Val de Fer mine in Neuves-Maisons
- Aumetz Iron Mine Museum
- Neufchef Iron Mine museum

==== Iron mines in Lorraine after 1945 ====
- Meurthe-et-Moselle North
  - Anderny-Chevillon mine at Tucquegnieux closed 1984
  - Auboué Colliery closed 1949
  - Aubrives-Villerupt mine closed 1962
  - Bazailles mine closed in 1981
  - Droitaumont mine at Jarny closed 1986
  - Errouville mine at Crusnes closed 1973
  - Giraumont mine closed 1978
  - Godbrange mine closed 1978
  - Homécourt mine closed 1981
  - Hussigny Colliery closed 1967
  - Jarny Colliery closed 1983
  - Jœuf mine closed 1968
  - La Mourière mine at Piennes closed 1967
  - Landres mine at Piennes closed 1968
  - Longwy mine closed 1983
  - Mairy mine at Mainville closed 1992
  - Micheville-Bréhain mine at Villerupt closed 1981
  - Moulaine mine closed 1962
  - Moutiers mine closed 1980
  - Murville mine at Mont-Bonvillers closed 1967
  - Paradis mine at Moineville closed 1981
  - Piennes mine at Joudreville closed 1984
  - Saint-Pierremont mine at Mancieulles closed 1978
  - Sancy mine at Trieux closed 1968
  - Serrouville mine closed 1987
  - Tiercelet mine at Thil closed 1965
  - Tucquegnieux mine closed 1988
  - Valleroy mine closed 1968
- Meurthe-et-Moselle Sud
  - Bois-du-Four mine at Sexey-aux-Forges closed 1966
  - Marbache mine closed 1957
  - Maron-Val-de-Fer mine at Neuves-Maisons closed 1968
  - Maxéville mine closed 1966
  - Saizerais mine at Dieulouard closed 1981
- Meuse
  - Amermont-Dommary mine at Bouligny closed 1985
  - Joudreville mine at Bouligny closed 1985
- Moselle
  - Aachen d'Ottange mine closed 1963
  - Angevillers mine at Algrange closed 1979
  - Aumetz mine closed 1983
  - Boulange mine closed 1969
  - Burbach mine at Algrange closed 1973
  - Bure mine closed 1973
  - Ferdinand mine at Tressange closed 1995
  - Fontoy mine closed 1952
  - Haut-Pont mine at Fontoy closed 1966
  - Havange mine at Fontoy closed 1983
  - Hayange mine closed 1989
  - Hettange-Grande mine at Entrange closed 1979
  - Heydt mine at Rédange closed 1966
  - Ida mine at Sainte-Marie-aux-Chênes closed 1972
  - Kraemer mine at Volmerange-les-Mines closed1977
  - Langenberg mine at Volmerange-les-Mines closed 1963
  - Montrouge mine at Audun-le-Tiche closed 1997
  - Moyeuvre mine closed 1995
  - Ottange I and III mine closed in 1971
  - Ottange II mine closed 1966
  - Pauline mine at Montois-la-Montagne closed 1969
  - Rédange mine closed 1972
  - Rochonvillers mine at Algrange closed 1981
  - Roncourt mine closed 1992
  - Sainte-Barbe mine at Algrange closed 1983
  - Sainte-Marie mine at Sainte-Marie-aux-Chênes closed 1971

==== Iron mines in Lorraine closed before 1945 ====
- Moselle
  - Hamevillers Neufchef mine closed in 1935
  - Marange Ternel mine at Marange-Silvange closed 1931
  - Pierrevillers mine closed 1931
  - La Paix mine Nilvange closed 1923

==== Normandy ====
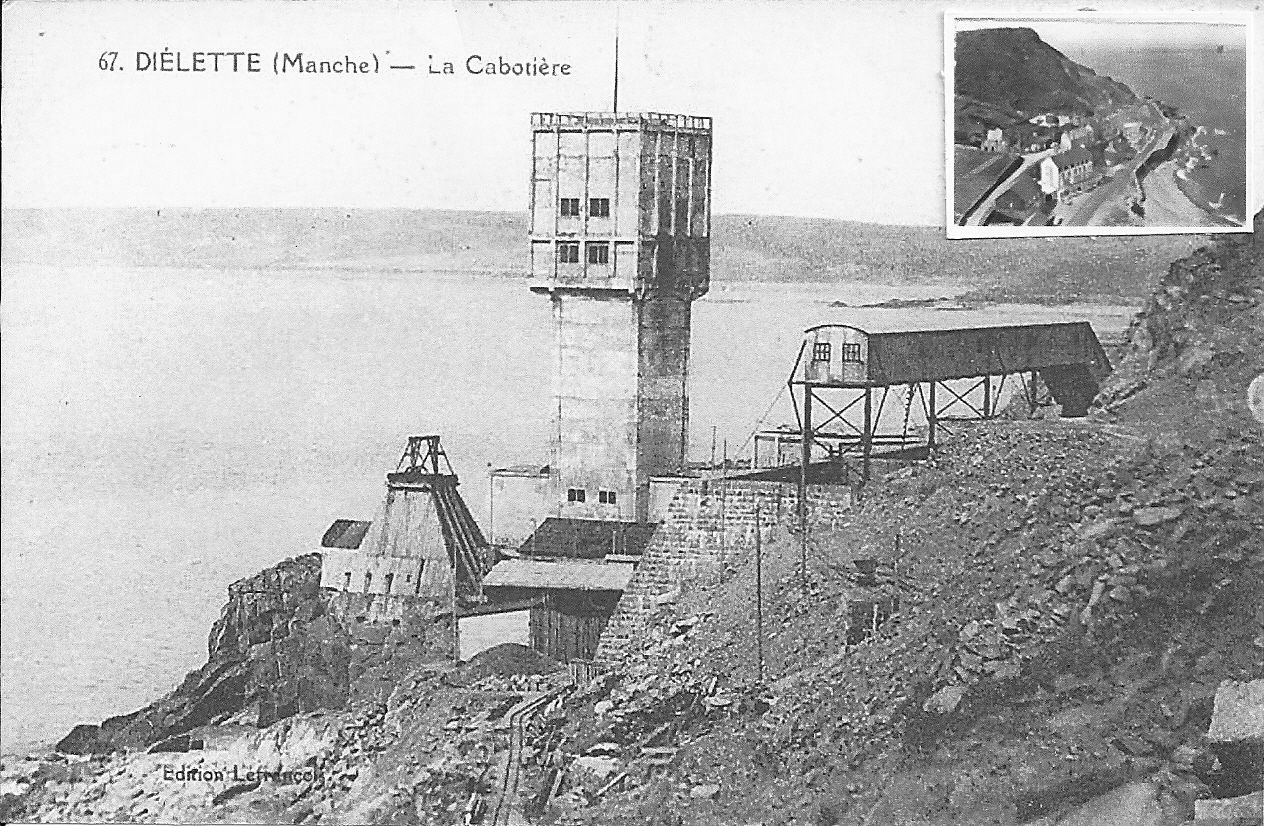
Flamanville mine.

There are essentially seven main iron ore mining sites in Normandy, active during the 20th century:

- 7 km south of Caen, Saint-André-sur-Orne and May-sur-Orne (Calvados): active from 1893 to 1968;
- Urville-Gouvix (Calvados): active from 1896 to 1968;
- Soumont, in the communes of Soumont-Saint-Quentin, Potigny and Saint-Germain-le-Vasson (Calvados): active from 1899 to 1989;
- Saint-Rémy (Calvados): active from 1875 to 1968;
- Diélette, commune of Flamanville (Manche), closed 1962;
- Halouze, commune of Saint-Clair-de-Halouze (Orne), active from 1905 to 1980;
- La Ferrière-aux-Étangs (Orne): active from 1903 to 1970.

==== Western Anjou and Brittany ====
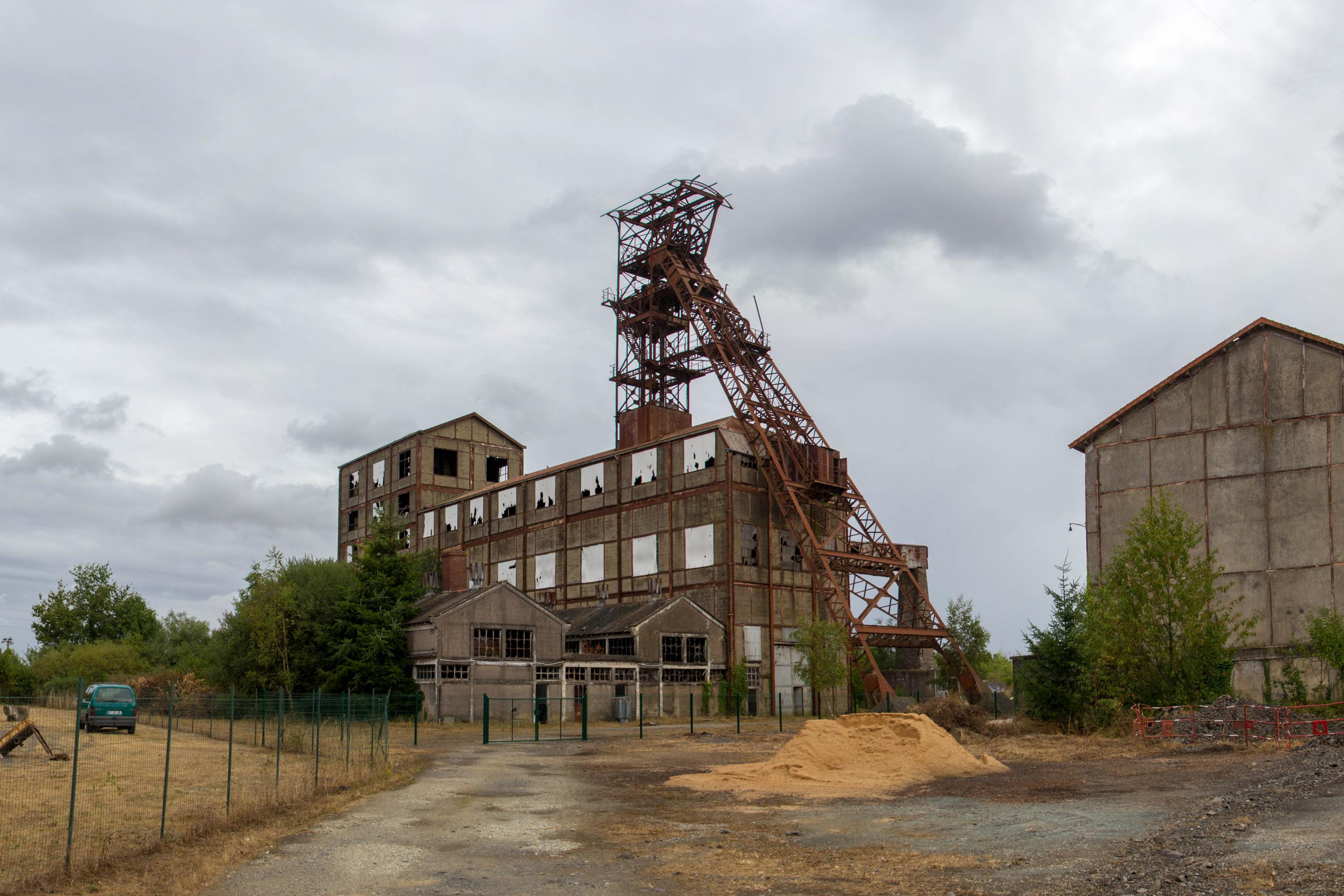
Chevalement du Puits de Bois 3 (1935), Nyoiseau.

Iron mining in the region between Châteaubriant and Segré really took off at the beginning of the 20th century. Germany's annexation of the Lorraine deposits and the development of the railroads enabled this long-established but underdeveloped industry to take on an industrial dimension.

Main mining sites in the region:

- Between 1907 and 1985, the Société des Mines de Fer de Segré operated five mining sites around Segré. The largest, and the last to close in 1985, was the site known as Bois 2, in the commune of Nyoiseau.
- Limèle mine, Sion-les-Mines, whose activity was interrupted several times and then relaunched until its closure in 1966.
- Brutz mine, between Teillay and Soulvache, active between 1920 and 1952.
- Mazuraie mine, Chazé-Henry, active between 1929 and 1963.
- Rougé mine, an open-cast mine in the Chateaubriand area of Bain-de-Bretagne, whose activity had slowed considerably since the 1970s. It officially closed in 2003.

=== Silver mining ===
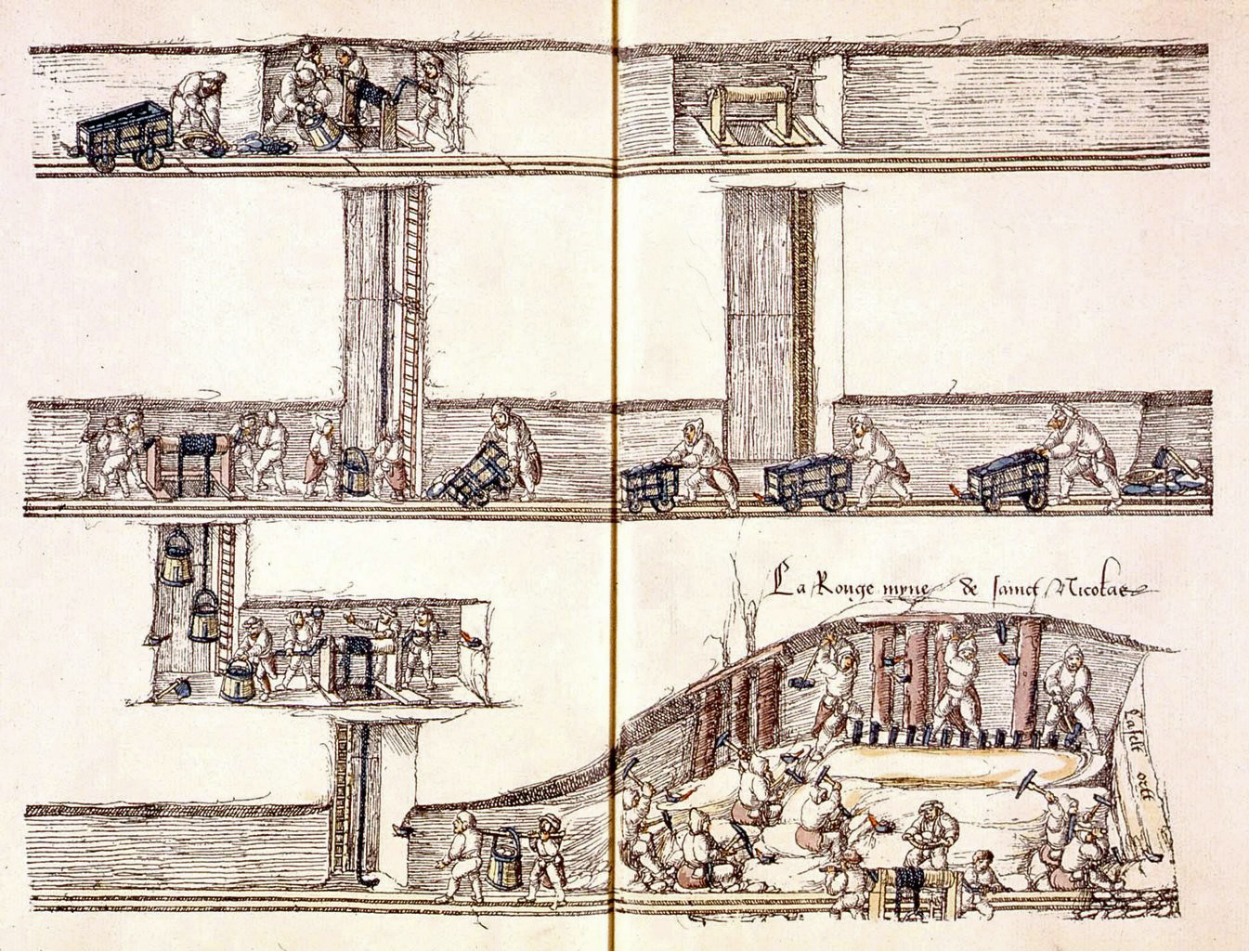
The galleries of the Saint-Nicolas Mine (La Croix-aux-Mines).

Silver mines as such were rare in Europe, most deposits often combining lead, zinc and silver, the exploitation of which gave rise to a chain of activities that were particularly polluting due to the toxicity and ecotoxicity of lead (often associated with equally toxic arsenic or antimony). In France, the main source of silver production was the processing of argentiferous lead (argentiferous galena) (Pontgibaud mines, Puy de Dôme, Pont-Péan mine, Ille-et-Vilaine); La Baume mine at Villefranche-de-Rouergue, Aveyron) and, to a lesser extent, silver-bearing coppers at Chalanches (Allemond, Isère), Giromagny (Territoire de Belfort), Plancher-les-Mines (Haute-Saône), La Croix-aux-Mines (Vosges) and Sainte-Marie-aux-Mines (Haut-Rhin). Silver was also mined at Melle (Deux-Sèvres), and at Largentière as a by-product of lead in galènes argentifères (Ardèche).

=== Andalusite ===
The Glomel andalusite mine is a French mining site located in Côtes-d'Armor (Brittany). Andalusite, has been extracted there since 1970 and is mainly used for the manufacture of refractory materials due to its resistance to high temperatures. The mine operator, Imerys, extracts 65,000 tonnes of andalusite each year, representing 20 to 25% of global production.

=== Other deposits ===
France has been a major producer of non-ferrous metals (ZnS-blende and PbS-galena) as well as non-metallic raw materials (BaSO_{4}-baryte, CaF_{2}-fluorite), which are particularly abundant in deposits at the interface between ancient basement and transgressive sedimentary series. These zones of fluid circulation have trapped mineral solutions. Examples of such deposits include mines in the Upper Maurienne valley, Fontsante in the Alpes Maritimes, Montagne Noire, Cévennes, Arize massif in Ariège and Massif de Mouthoumet in Aude.

==== Hydrocarbons ====
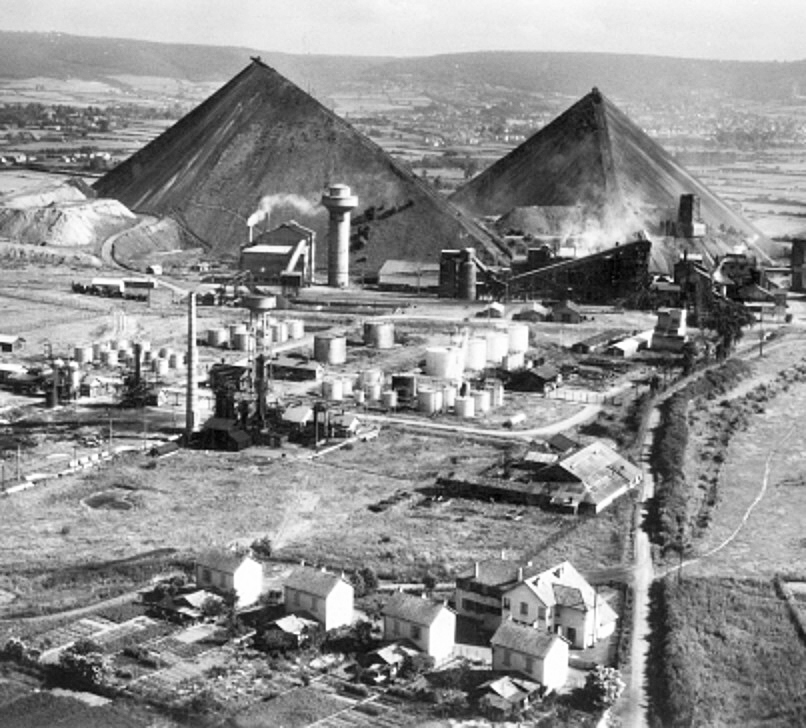
Télots mine.

France has never been a major oil producer. Oil production, currently on the order of 18,000 barrels per day, or barely 1% of national consumption, is divided between two regions, the Paris Basin and Aquitaine. Gas production has historically been higher, thanks to the Lacq field (Pyrénées-Atlantiques).

Oil shale mines:

- Télots mine
- Creveney shale mining
- Saint-Ambroix

Other:

- Pechelbronn oil mine
- Dallet bituminous limestone

==== Uranium ====
Uranium occurs naturally in France, including in the granite massifs of Brittany and especially the Massif Central. Uranium was mined at 200 sites in France between the end of the Second World War and May 2001, when the last French mine at Jouac, Haute-Vienne, closed.

==== Lead-zinc ====
The Saint-Salvy-de-la-Balme (Tarn), Les Malines (Gard) and Largentière (Ardèche) mines were the main deposits exploited in mainland France in the 20th century. All from La Société minière et métallurgique de Penarroya.

==== Copper ====
The Pioch Farrus mine in Cabrières (Hérault) is one of the oldest copper mining sites in France. Like many metal mines, it was exploited intermittently from prehistoric times (around 3000 BC), in Antiquity, in the Middle Ages. Excavations continued into the 19th century. Also mined in Antiquity, the Gallo-Roman Goutil copper mine at La Bastide-de-Sérou (Ariège) underwent similar developments in later centuries. In the 19th century, the Croix-sur-Roudoule site (Alpes-Maritimes) was also mined, and a copper museum was established in the hamlet of Léouvé.

In Le Pradet, Var, the Cap Garonne mine was mined from 1857 to 1917, and today houses a museum.

At Le Thillot in the Vosges, copper mines were exploited from 1560 to 1761 by the Dukes of Lorraine. Today, the Hautes-Mynes site provides an opportunity to discover these former mines.

In a strategic move, France is revitalizing its dormant copper mining industry, essential for connecting solar and wind farms and building power interconnections with neighboring countries.

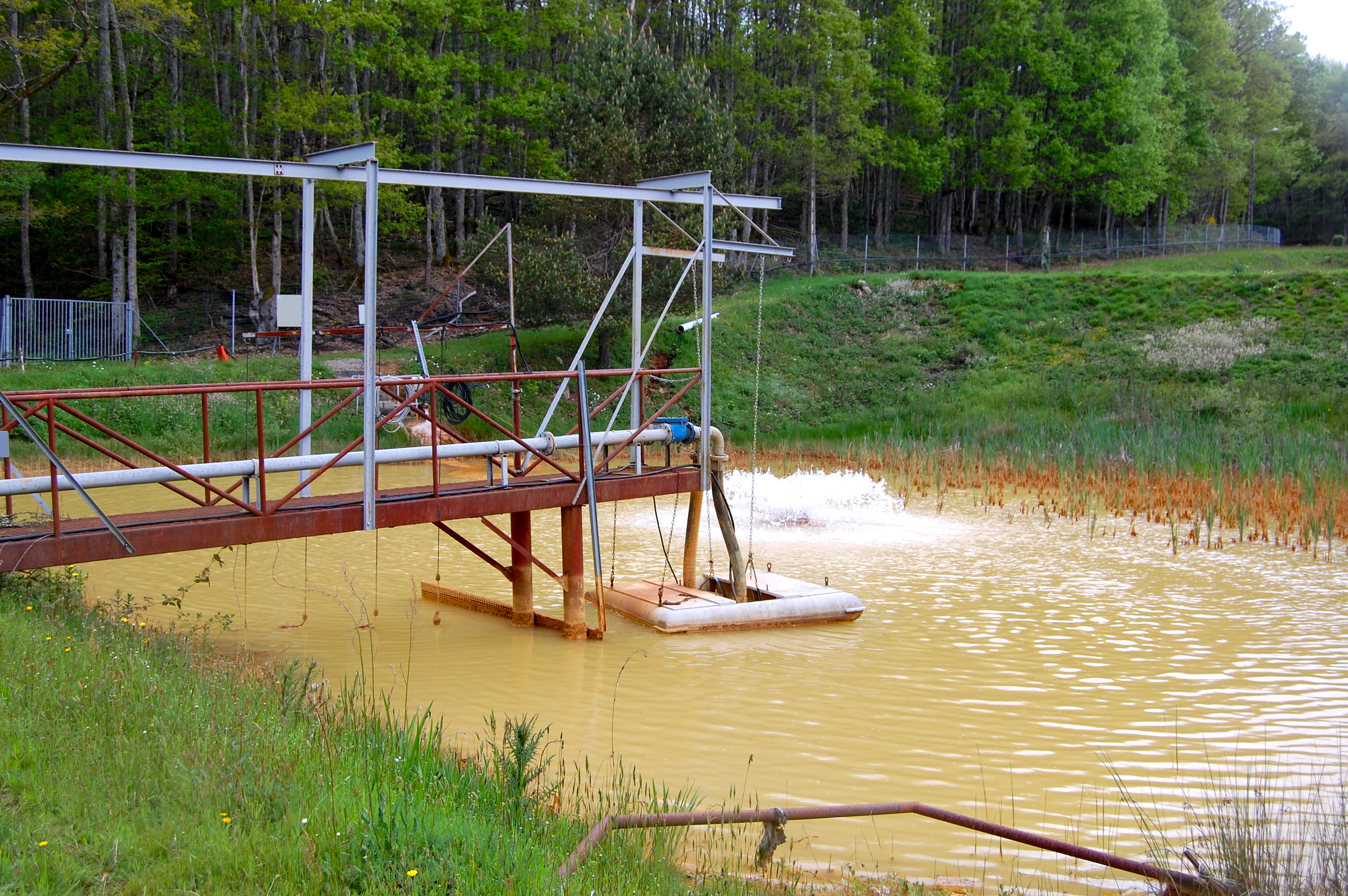
Former Bourneix gold mine (Jumilhac-le-Grand), processing basin.

==== Gold ====
The Châtelet gold mine in Creuse produced 15 tonnes of gold between 1905 and 1955. However, the main French gold mine is the Salsigne gold mine (Aude), which closed in 2004. The Bourneix mine (Haute-Vienne) also closed in 2001.

==== Bauxite ====
Provence is rich in clay and bauxite. The Mazaugues mines, to the west of Brignoles, have provided an enormous amount of ore. There are also bauxite mines in Villeveyrac (from 1991 to October 2009, with 2,000,000 tonnes mined in open-cast). Underground mines are in preparation, with production due to start in early 2010, targeting 250,000 / 300,000 tonnes per year. Villeveyrac is located 18 km from the port of Sète for export sales. Deposit quality: Al_{2}O_{3} from 53 to 75%, SiO_{2} from 0.5% to 15%, Fe_{2}O_{3} from 4% to 27%.

There are also the mines and ores of Languedoc, where bauxite has been mined for decades and is still exploitable: this ore is used in additives for cement manufacturers, and also transits through Sète.

==== Tungsten ====
It can be extracted from scheelite, for example at Salau in the Ariège region of France.

==== Magnesium, talc ====
The major talc deposit is the Trimouns talc quarry, near Luzenac (Ariège), the largest in the world (400,000 tons extracted per year), which also produces remarkable groups of crystals associated with rare-earth crystallizations.

==== Pyrites ====
The old Saint-Pierre-la-Palud pyrite mine, whose Musée de la Mine de Saint-Pierre-la-Palud can be visited today, was exploited to produce sulfuric acid, and was the origin of Lyon's entire Chemical Valley.

=== Rock salt and salt springs ===
The Varangéville salt mines (Lorraine) are still exploited today for their halite (rock salt).

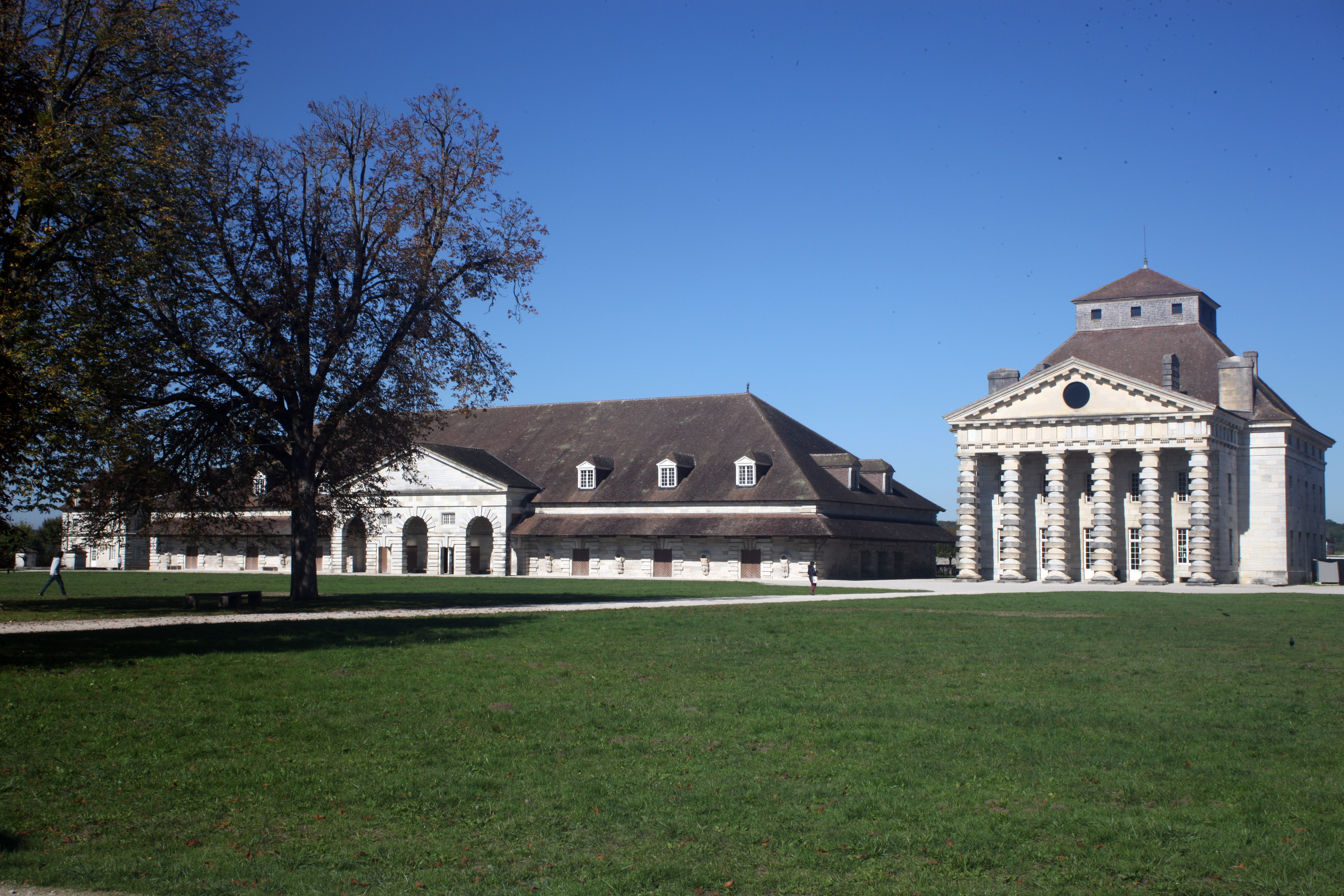
Royal Saltworks of Arc-et-Senans.

==== Doubs ====
- Royal Saltworks of Arc-et-Senans
- Châtillon-le-Duc saltworks
- Miserey saltworks
- Montferrand saltworks
- Pouilley saltworks
- Saint-Hippolyte saltworks
- Serre-les-Sapins saltworks
- Soulce saltworks

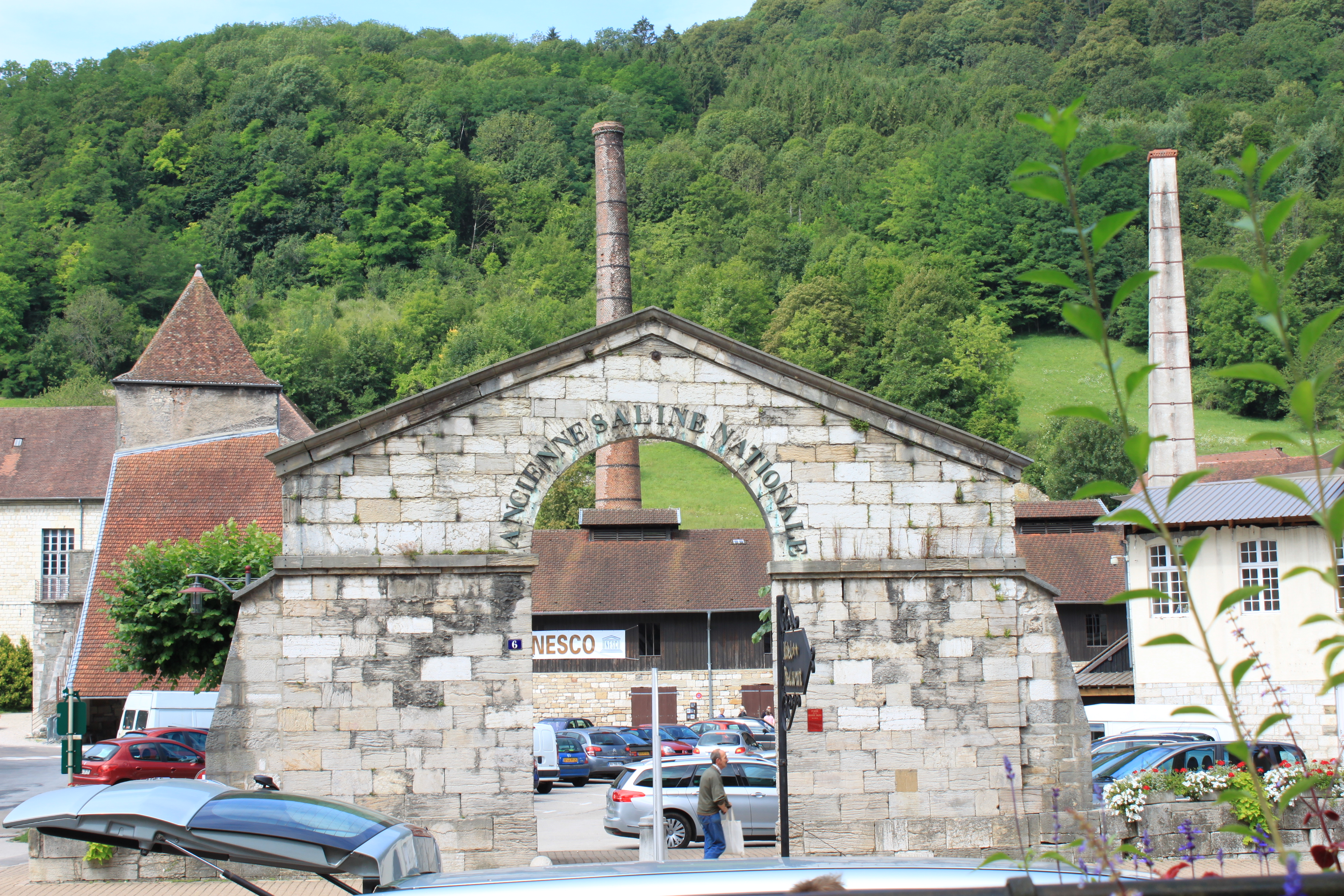
Salins-les-Bains saltworks.

==== Jura ====
- Salins-les-Bains saltworks
- Lons-le-Saunier saltworks
- Montmorot saltworks
- Montaigu saltworks
- Grozon saltworks
- Poligny saltworks

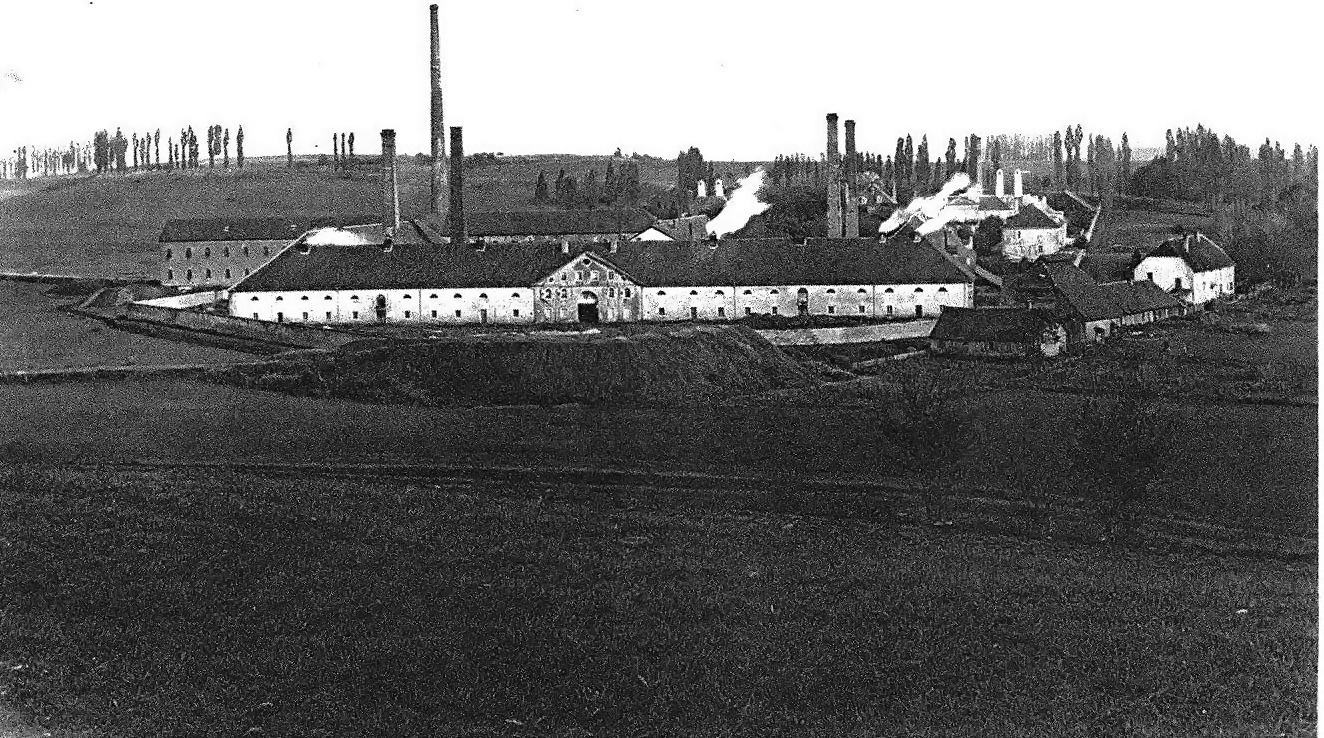
Gouhenans saltworks.

==== Haute-Saône ====
- Gouhenans saltworks
- Saulnot saltworks
- Mélecey saltworks
- Athesans-Etroitefontaine saltworks
- Scey-sur-Saône saltworks

==== Meurthe-et-Moselle ====
- Art-sur-Meurthe saltworks
- Crévic saltworks
- Dombasle-sur-Meurthe saltworks
- Einville-au-Jard saltworks
- Laneuveville-devant-Nancy saltworks
- Maixe saltworks
- Rosières-aux-Salines saltworks
- Sommerviller saltworks
- Tomblaine saltworks
- Varangéville saltworks

==== Moselle ====
- Chambrey saltworks
- Château-Salins saltworks
- Dieuze saltworks
- Marsal saltworks
- Moyenvic saltworks
- Saléaux saltworks in Ley
- Salonnes saltworks
- Vic-sur-Seille saltworks

==== Salt mines ====
- Saint-Laurent mine at Einville-au-Jard
- Rosières-aux-Salines-Varangéville mine
- Saint-Nicolas mine in Varangéville

==== Mines and saltworks still in operation ====
- Mines
  - Saint-Nicolas mine in Varangéville
- Salt works
  - Dombasle-sur-Meurthe saltworks
  - Einville-au-Jard saltworks
  - Varangéville saltworks
- Soudières (soda work)
  - Dombasle-sur-Meurthe soda works
  - La Madeleine soda works in Laneuveville-devant-Nancy

==== Potash ====
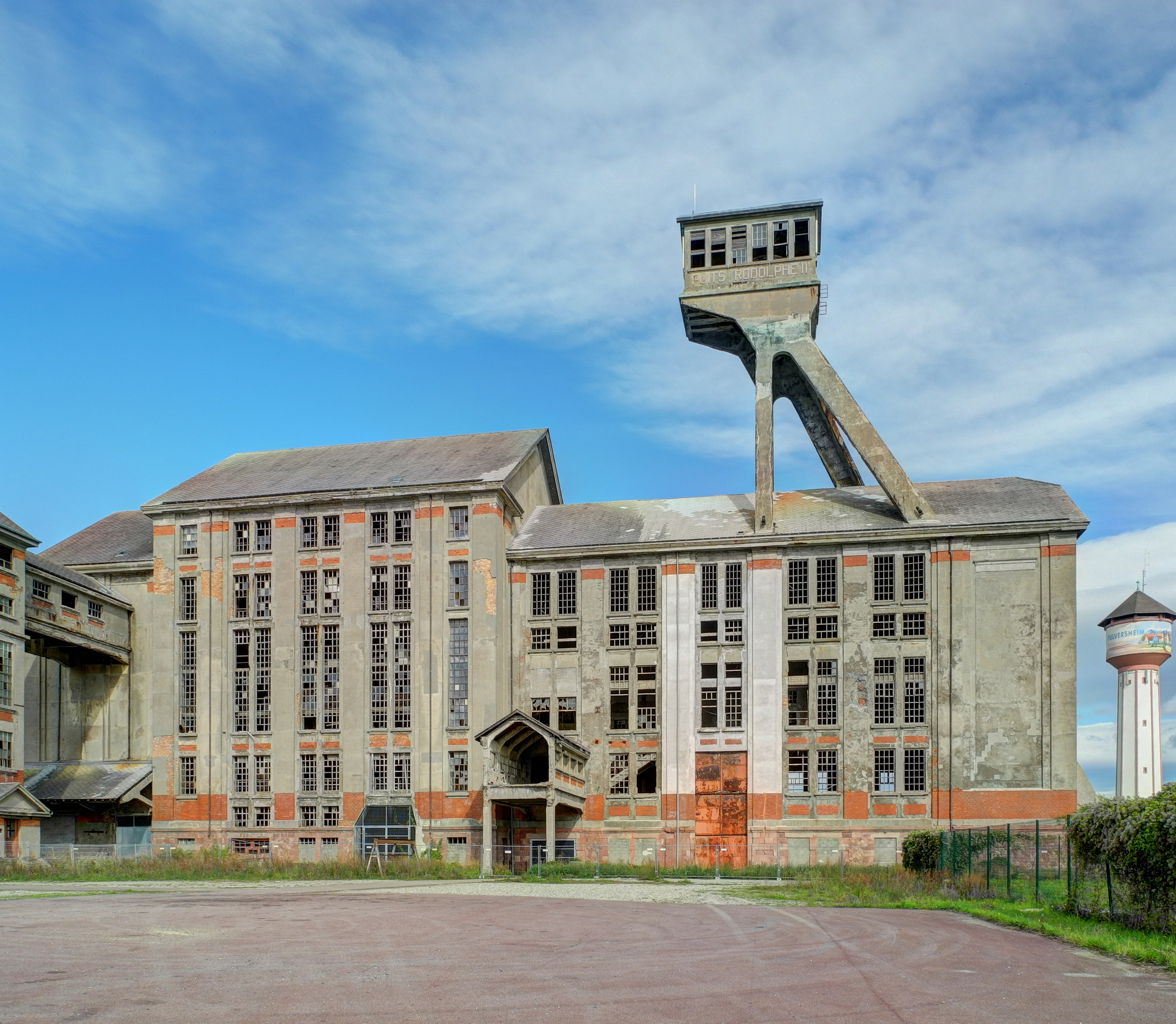
Rodolphe II well.

Potash resources are mainly located in eastern France. The potash mines of Alsace, located in the Haut-Rhin department in the area between Cernay, Mulhouse and Ensisheim, supplied potash in large quantities between 1910 and 2002.

A total of 567 million tonnes of raw salt were extracted during this period. 11 mines and 24 shafts were in operation over a basin covering 20,000 ha.

==== Fluorite ====
Fluorite is associated with barite and was mined at Chaillac (Indre). It has not been mined at Mont-Roc (Tarn) since 2005. It has been mined at Langeac and Sainte-Marguerite (Haute-Loire), as well as in Saône-et-Loire, where reserves are still very significant.

Other sites include the Saint-Laurent-les-Bains mines in Ardèche. The last mining campaign was brought to an abrupt halt in 1959, following the accidental detour of thermal water in one of the galleries. Extensive sealing operations restored the situation.

== French mines in operation in the 21st century ==
Following the closure of the Lorraine iron mine (1998), the coal mine (2004), the uranium mine, the potash mine and the goldmine (Salsigne closed in 2004), the international Sogerem/Alcan group (formerly Pechiney) closed the Tarn fluorite mines in 2006: the Mont-Roc and Moulinal open-pit mines (in the communes of Paulinet and Rayssac) and the Burg underground mine (Paulinet). The barite quarries at Chaillac (Indre) are also due to close. The only remaining mines in mainland France will be salt mines in Lorraine, Varangéville and various other deposits used mainly as underground storage for hydrocarbons (notably at Manosque and Étrez), a small open-pit bauxite mine at Villeveyrac (Hérault), whose ore is not used foralumina production, bitumen at Orbagnoux (Ain), asphaltic limestone at Rébesou (Gard), hydrocarbons (Île-de-France, Aquitaine, Alsace) and the Trélazé slate mine (closed in 2014) in Maine-et-Loire.

In response to the historical closures of traditional mines and the dwindling diversity of operational mines in France, the government is actively revitalizing the mining sector with a focus on developing critical resources, such as copper and lithium, as well as geothermal energy. To overcome historical bureaucratic delays, measures have been introduced to halve the time required for securing research and operational permits for mining and geothermal projects. This initiative aims to enhance operational efficiency, shift focus towards sustainable and strategically vital resources, and align the mining sector with broader environmental and economic goals.

== Prospects and potential ==
France is home to significant rock and mineral resources for the communications and electrical storage industries, as well as numerous metals (tungsten, antimony, gold, lead, zinc, germanium, copper, lithium and molybdenum).

However, the need for rare earths, essential for technological change, has led to the opening up of new mines. For example, France could be self-sufficient in lithium, a strategic metal used in rechargeable batteries, from hard rock in the Massif Central (e.g. Montebras mine in Creuse) and geothermal brine in Alsace. The potential is in excess of 200,000 t of lithium metal. This is also the case for a project to reopen the Salau tungsten mine at Couflens in Ariège.

To accompany extraction, ore treatment processes need to be designed and developed in France and Europe.

France is actively pursuing advancements in its mining and geothermal energy sectors, recognizing their potential to contribute significantly to the country's energy strategy. The exploration of lithium by notable companies such as Imerys SA, Eramet SA, and Arverne Group SA is projected to meet two-thirds of the nation's requirements for electric vehicle batteries by 2035. In parallel, the national geothermal action plan is set to enhance the production of renewable heat, targeting an increase to 6 terawatt hours from deep geothermal sources by 2028 and aiming for 10 terawatt hours from geothermal heat pumps by 2030. These initiatives are crucial components of France's broader strategy to achieve energy self-sufficiency and to meet its climate objectives, demonstrating a committed shift towards sustainable energy resources.

== See also ==
- Mining
- Natural resource
- Courrières mine disaster
- Saint-Charles shaft
- Creveney shale mining operation

== Bibliography ==
- Couriot (2002). Musée de la mine de Saint-Étienne. Patrimoine du bassin de la Loire no 1 (in French).
- L'héritage industriel de Saint-Étienne et de son territoire. Patrimoines du bassin de la Loire no 2 (in French). Musée de la mine de Saint-Étienne. 2006.
- Bedoin, M. (1985). Le patrimoine minier stéphanois Guide de promenade (in French). Roche-La-Molière.
- Lauff, André (1950–2006). Le Sous-Sol Lorrain. Mineurs au quotidien (in French). Fensch-Vallée Éditions.
- Ministère de l'industrie (1980). Les ressources minières françaises (in French). FRA. pp. 1–192.
- DGRST. Gisements français de Pb, Zn, W, Sn, Au, As, barytine, fluorine, talc (in French). FRA.
- BRGM. Les résidus miniers français: typologie et principaux impacts environnementaux potentiels (in French).
