= Gravelotte =

- Commune
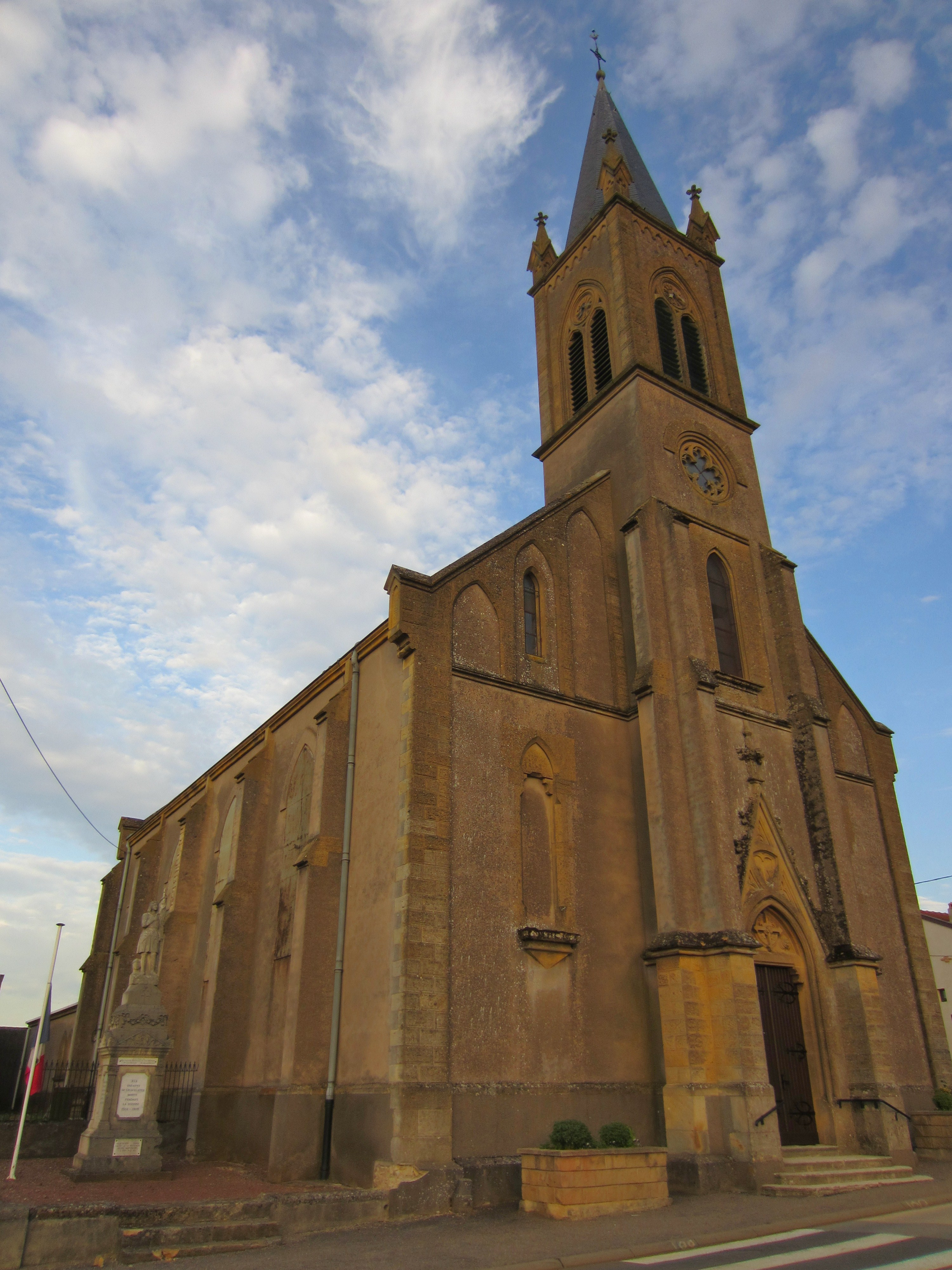
- The church in Gravelotte

- Coat of arms
- Location of Gravelotte
- Location within France Location within Grand Est
- Coordinates: 49°06′38″N 6°01′50″E
- Country: France
- Region: Grand Est
- Department: Moselle
- Arrondissement: Metz
- Canton: Les Coteaux de Moselle
- Intercommunality: Metz Métropole

Government
  - Mayor (2020–2026): Michel Torloting
- Area^{1}: 5.66 km^{2} (2.19 sq mi)
- Highest elevation: 325 m (1,066 ft)
- Lowest elevation: 221 m (725 ft)
- Population (2023): 817
  - Density: 144/km^{2} (374/sq mi)
- Demonym(s): Gravelottin, Gravelottine
- Time zone: UTC+01:00 (CET)
  - Summer (DST): UTC+02:00 (CEST)
- INSEE/Postal code: 57256 /57130
- Website: www.gravelotte.org
- ^{1} French Land Register data, which excludes lakes, ponds, glaciers > 1 km^{2} (0.386 sq mi or 247 acres) and river estuaries.

Gravelotte (French pronunciation: [ɡʁavlɔt]; German: Gravelotte) is a commune in the Moselle department in Grand Est in north-eastern France, 11 km west of Metz. It is part of the functional area (aire d'attraction) of Metz. Its population is 827 (2019).

From 1871 until the end of World War I in 1918, it was the westernmost city of Germany.

== History ==
Gravelotte is located between Metz and the former French-German frontier, as it was between 1870 and 1918. It was famous as the scene of the battle of 18 August 1870 between the Germans under King William of Prussia and the French under Marshal Bazaine. The battlefield extends from the woods which border the Moselle above Metz to Roncourt, near the river Orne. Other villages which played an important part in the battle of Gravelotte were Saint-Privat, Amanvillers and Sainte-Marie-aux-Chênes, all lying to the north of Gravelotte.

During WW1, the village was spared from the fighting. After the Armistice of 1918 and the signing of the Treaty of Versailles in June 1919, the village of Gravelotte became French again.

Between 1940 and 1944, as in the rest of the annexed Moselle, many young people, who were forcibly enlisted into the German army, were sent to the Eastern Front, some of them never returned. The commune was liberated by General Patton's troops in 1944, during the battle of Metz.

== Sights ==
=== Military sites and buildings ===
- Military cemetery: nearly 8,000 people are buried there.
- Musée de la Guerre de 1870 et de l'Annexion : a museum dedicated to the Franco-Prussian War and the annexation of Alsace-Lorraine.

== See also ==
- Communes of the Moselle department
- Parc naturel régional de Lorraine
- Schirwindt - easternmost point of Germany before 1945
