= Battle of Gravelotte =

1870 battle of the Franco-Prussian War

- Part of the Franco-Prussian War
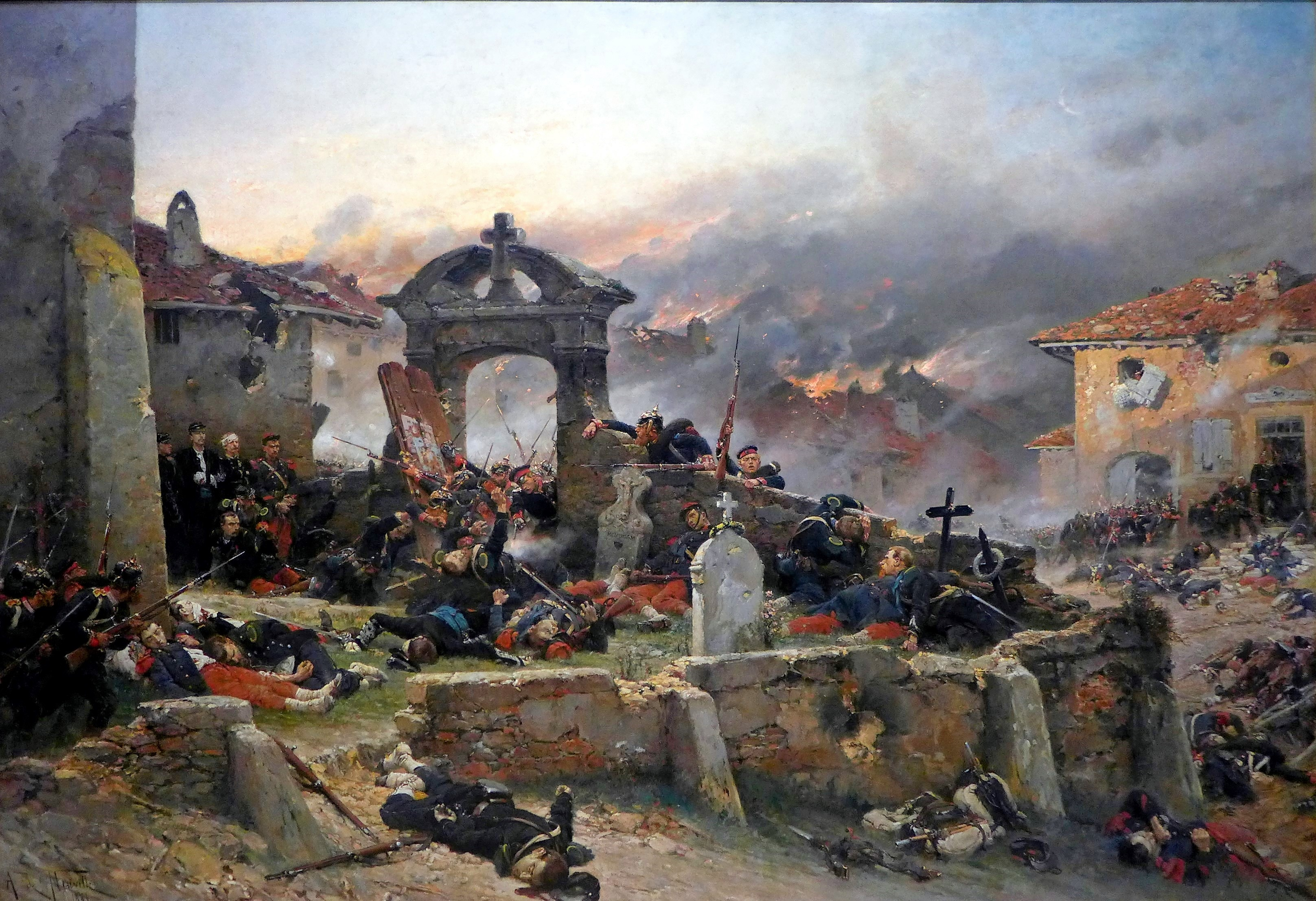
- The Cemetery of St. Privat by Alphonse-Marie-Adolphe de Neuville c. 1881
| Date | 18 August 1870 |
| Location | Gravelotte, France 49°09′N 6°01′E |
| Result | Prussian strategic victory |

Belligerents
| (German Empire) North German Confederation (Kingdom of Prussia) Prussia Saxony | (Second French Empire) French Empire |

Commanders and leaders
| (Kingdom of Prussia) Wilhelm I (Kingdom of Prussia) Helmuth von Moltke (Kingdom of Prussia) Karl Friedrich von Steinmetz (Kingdom of Prussia) Prince Friedrich Karl | (Second French Empire) François Achille Bazaine (Second French Empire) François Certain de Canrobert |

Units involved
| (Kingdom of Prussia) First Army (Kingdom of Prussia) Second Army | (Second French Empire) Army of the Rhine |

Strength
| 188,332; 732 guns | 112,800; 520 guns |

Casualties and losses
| 20,160 5,237 killed 14,430 wounded 493 captured or missing | 12,275 1,146 killed 6,709 wounded 4,420 captured or missing |

The Battle of Gravelotte (or Battle of Gravelotte–St. Privat) on 18 August 1870 was the largest battle of the Franco-Prussian War. Named after Gravelotte, a village in Lorraine, it was fought about 6 miles (9.7 km) west of Metz, where on the previous day, having intercepted the French army's retreat to the west at the Battle of Mars-la-Tour, the Prussians were now closing in to complete the destruction of the French forces.

The combined German forces under King Wilhelm I were the Prussian First and Second Armies of the North German Confederation with 210 infantry battalions, 133 cavalry squadrons, and 732 heavy cannons totaling 188,332 officers and men. The French Army of the Rhine, commanded by Marshal François Achille Bazaine, dug in along high ground with their southern left flank at the town of Rozerieulles, and their northern right flank at St. Privat.

On 18 August, the Prussian First Army under General Karl Friedrich von Steinmetz launched its VII and VIII Corps in repeated assaults against the French positions, backed by artillery and cavalry support. All attacks failed with enormous casualties in the face of French infantry and mitrailleuse firepower. The French did not counter-attack Steinmetz's weakened army. On the Prussian left, the Prussian Guards attacked the French position at St. Privat at 16:50 hours. With the support of the Prussian II and Saxon XII Corps of Prince Friedrich Karl's Second Army, the Guards conquered St. Privat by 20:00 hours after heavy losses, pushing back the French right wing.

Bazaine's Army of the Rhine withdrew into Metz fortress on the morning of 19 August. The German victory at Gravelotte ended Bazaine's army's last chance of retreating west to Verdun. After a siege lasting over two months, the Army of the Rhine surrendered on 27 October 1870.

== Background ==
The German Second Army, commanded by Prince Friedrich Karl of Prussia had met the right wing of the French Army of the Rhine, commanded by Marshal Bazaine, at the Battle of Mars-La-Tour — both sides claimed victory. Marshal Bazaine's four corps of the French Army of the Rhine retreated in vile weather along the road toward Verdun. The Germans were on their heels, pressing hard to prevent the Army of the Rhine from linking up with French forces at Sedan.

The pursuing Prussian First and Second Armies had more artillery, men, and ammunition than Bazaine's four corps. Their pressure forced Bazaine to occupy the crests of the gently rolling hilltops east of the Moselle, with his southern left flank at the town of Rozerieulles, and his northern right flank at St. Privat. They lacked efficient digging tools, but Bazaine regarded the position as virtually impregnable, with the defenders sheltered behind hedges and low walls and anchored in villages and farmhouses.

The battlefield extended from the woods bordering the Moselle above Metz to Roncourt, near the river Orne. Other villages that played an important part in the battle were Saint Privat, Amanweiler or Amanvillers and Sainte-Marie-aux-Chênes, all lying to the north of Gravelotte.

== Battle ==
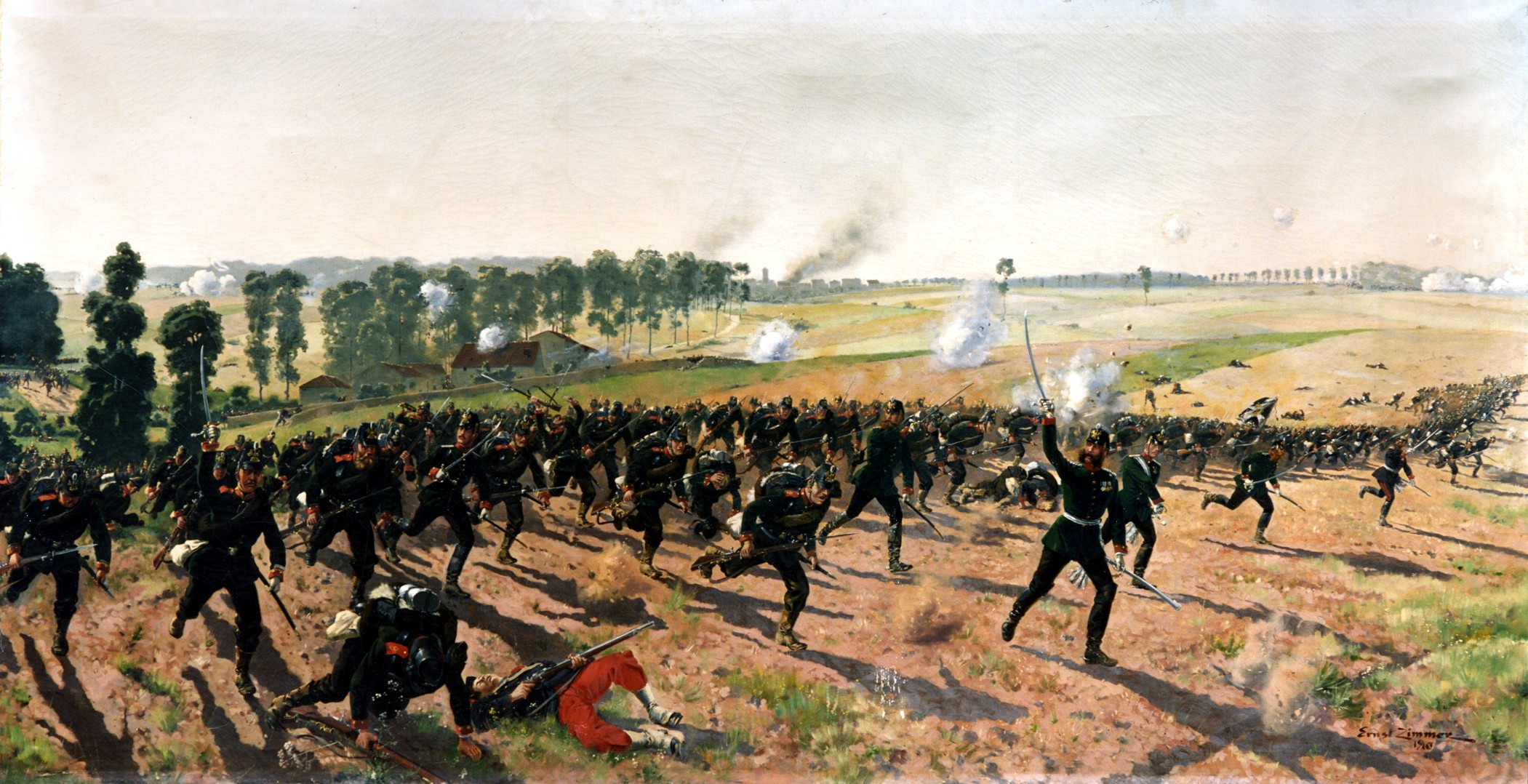
The "Rifle Battalion 9 from Lauenburg" at Gravelotte, painting by Ernst Zimmer

The French cavalry failed to detect the strength of the Prussian pursuit. On 18 August at 08:00 Wilhelm I, whose chief of staff was Moltke, ordered the First and Second Armies to advance against the French positions. By 12:00, General Manstein with artillery from the Hessian 25th Infantry Division was advancing toward the village of Amanvillers. The mass of advancing Germans was met with murderous fire from the superior French Chassepot rifle and their rapid-firing mitrailleuses, before they were within range to retaliate with their shorter-ranged needle-guns. At 14:30, General Steinmetz, the commander of the First Army, launched his VIII Corps across the Mance Ravine but they were soon pinned down by rifle and mitrailleuse fire. At 15:00, the massed new Krupp all-steel breech-loading guns of the German VII and VIII Corps opened fire to support the attack. But with the attack still failing, at 16:00 Steinmetz ordered the VII Corps forward, followed by the 1st Cavalry Division.

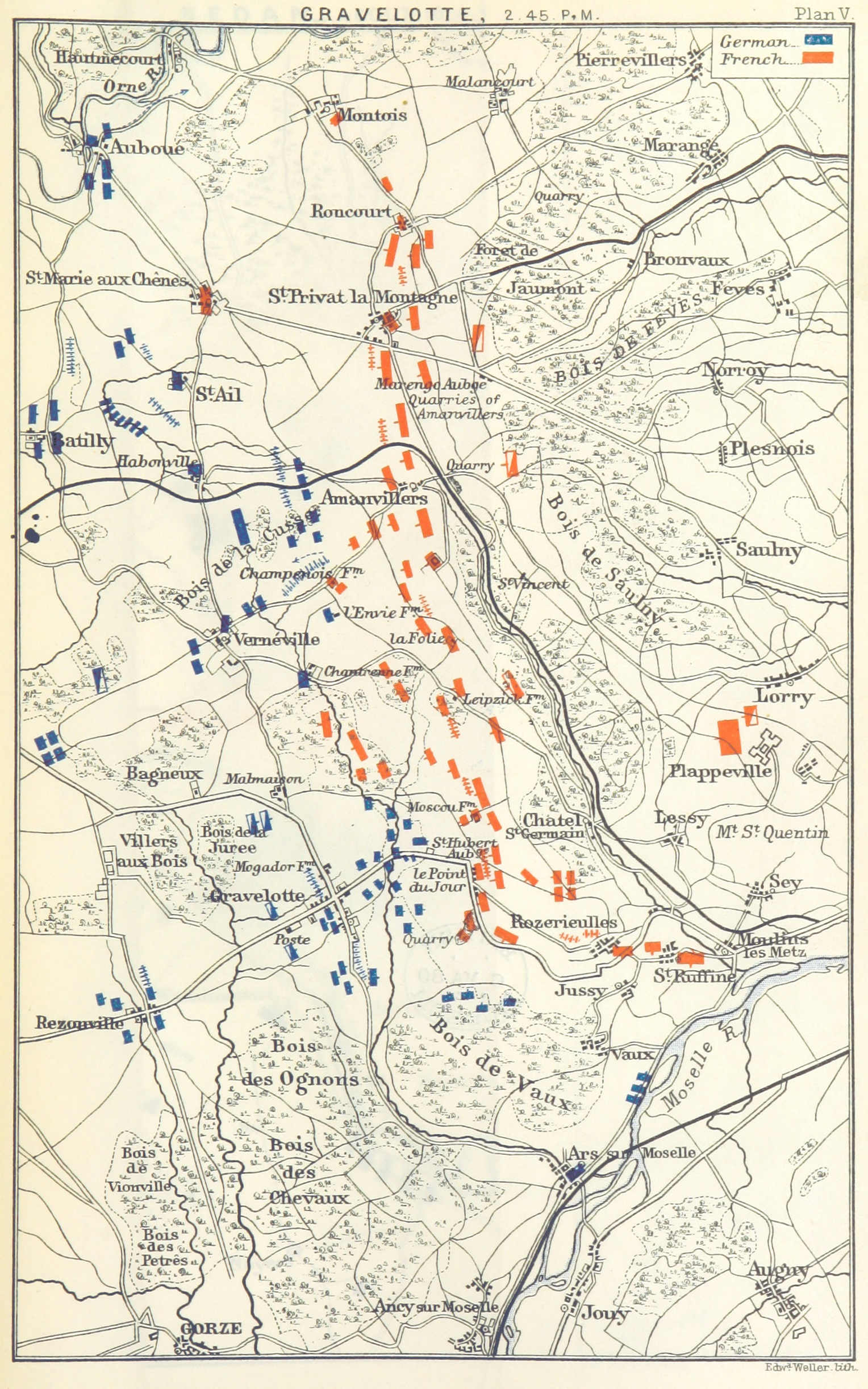
French and German forces at 14:45.

At 16:50, with the Prussian southern attacks stalling, the Prussian 3rd Guards Infantry Brigade of the Second Army opened an attack against the French positions at St. Privat, which were commanded by Marshal Canrobert. At 17:15, the Prussian 4th Guards Infantry Brigade joined the advance followed at 17:45 by the Prussian 1st Guards Infantry Brigade. All of the Prussian Guard attacks were pinned down on the slopes by lethal French gunfire. At 18:00 King William ordered a renewed advance. At 18:15 the Prussian 2nd Guards Infantry Brigade, the last of the 1st Guards Infantry Division, was committed to the attack on St. Privat, while Steinmetz ordered the last unit in the reserves of the First Army across the Mance Ravine. By 18:30, a considerable portion of the VII and VIII Corps panicked and disengaged from the fighting without attaining their objective and withdrew towards the Prussian positions at Rezonville.

With the partial withdrawal of the First Army, Prince Frederick Charles ordered a mass artillery barrage against Canrobert's position at St. Privat to prevent the Guards attack from failing too. At 19:00 the 3rd Division of Eduard von Fransecky's II Corps of the Second Army advanced across Ravine while the Saxon XII Corps cleared out the nearby town of Roncourt, along with the survivors of the 1st Guards Infantry Division, launched a fresh attack against the ruins of St. Privat. At 20:00, the arrival of the Prussian 4th Infantry Division of the II Corps and with the Prussian right flank on Mance Ravine, the line stabilized. Then, the Prussians of the 1st Guards Infantry Division and the XII and II Corps captured St. Privat, forcing the decimated French forces to withdraw. Some French officers incorrectly thought the Prussians were exhausted, so they urged a counter-attack. General Bourbaki, however, refused to commit the reserves of the French Old Guard to the battle because, by that time, he rightfully considered the overall situation a 'defeat' having run out of ammunition, being outflanked by Prussian artillery, and losing 1/4 of his men. By 22:00, firing largely died down across the battlefield for the night.

== Aftermath ==
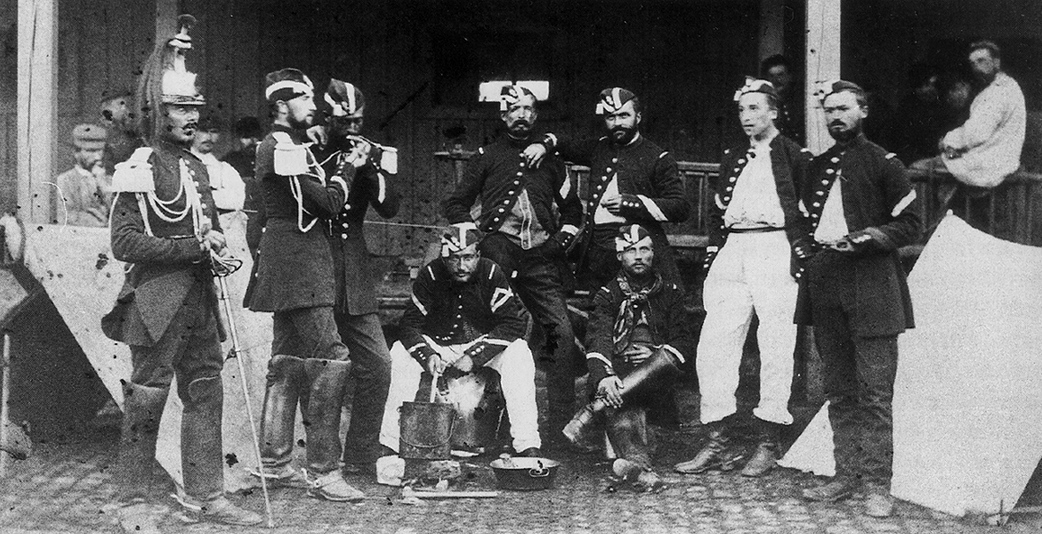
French Cuirassiers in Metz

The next morning, the exhausted French Army of the Rhine retreated to Metz where they were besieged and forced to surrender two months later.

=== Analysis ===
The battle was a Prussian victory in that it succeeded in blocking Bazaine's way to Verdun. In a short time the Prussians trapped Bazaine in the city and the Siege of Metz ensued.

=== Casualties ===
The casualties were severe. The combined Prussian and Hessian force had 20,163 troops killed, wounded or missing in action during the 18 August battle. The French losses were 1,146 killed along with 6,709 wounded and 4,420 prisoners of war (half of these were wounded) for a total of 12,275. Howard qualifies the French casualty records as 'incomplete'. While most Prussians fell to the French Chassepot rifle, most French fell to the Krupp shells of the Prussian artillery. In a breakdown of the casualties, Steinmetz's Prussian First Army lost 4,300 men before the Pointe du Jour, while the French forces opposing him had casualties of 2,155. Losses of the Prussian Guards Corps were even more staggering, with 8,000 casualties out of 18,000 men. The Guards Jäger Battalion lost 19 officers, a surgeon and 431 men killed, wounded, or missing out of a total of 700. The 2nd Guards Infantry Brigade lost 39 officers and 1,076 men. The 3rd Guards Infantry Brigade lost 36 officers and 1,060 men. On the French side, the units holding St. Privat lost more than half their number in the village.
