= Fèves =

- Commune
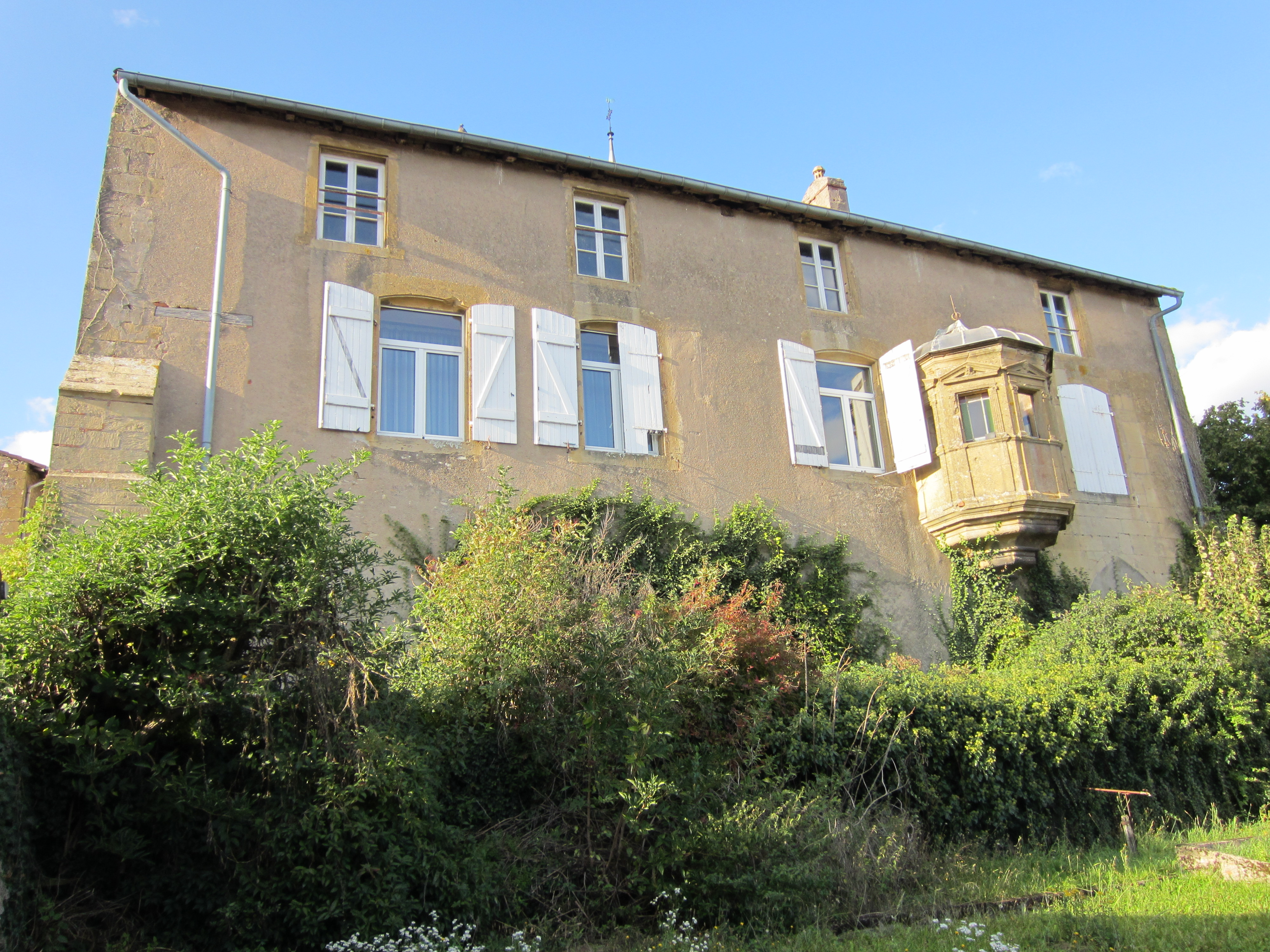
- The old priory in Fèves

- Coat of arms
- Location of Fèves
- Location within France Location within Grand Est
- Coordinates: 49°11′46″N 6°07′14″E
- Country: France
- Region: Grand Est
- Department: Moselle
- Arrondissement: Metz
- Canton: Rombas
- Intercommunality: CC Rives de Moselle

Government
  - Mayor (2020–2026): Armand Patrignani
- Area^{1}: 4.8 km^{2} (1.9 sq mi)
- Elevation: 292 m (958 ft)
- Highest elevation: 373 m (1,224 ft)
- Lowest elevation: 167 m (548 ft)
- Population (2023): 1,193
  - Density: 250/km^{2} (640/sq mi)
- Time zone: UTC+01:00 (CET)
  - Summer (DST): UTC+02:00 (CEST)
- INSEE/Postal code: 57211 /57280
- ^{1} French Land Register data, which excludes lakes, ponds, glaciers > 1 km^{2} (0.386 sq mi or 247 acres) and river estuaries.

Fèves (French pronunciation: [fɛv]; German: Fewen from 1915-1918 and 1940–1944, before 1915: Feves) is a commune in the Moselle department in Grand Est in north-eastern France.

== See also ==
- Communes of the Moselle department
