= Saulny =

- Commune
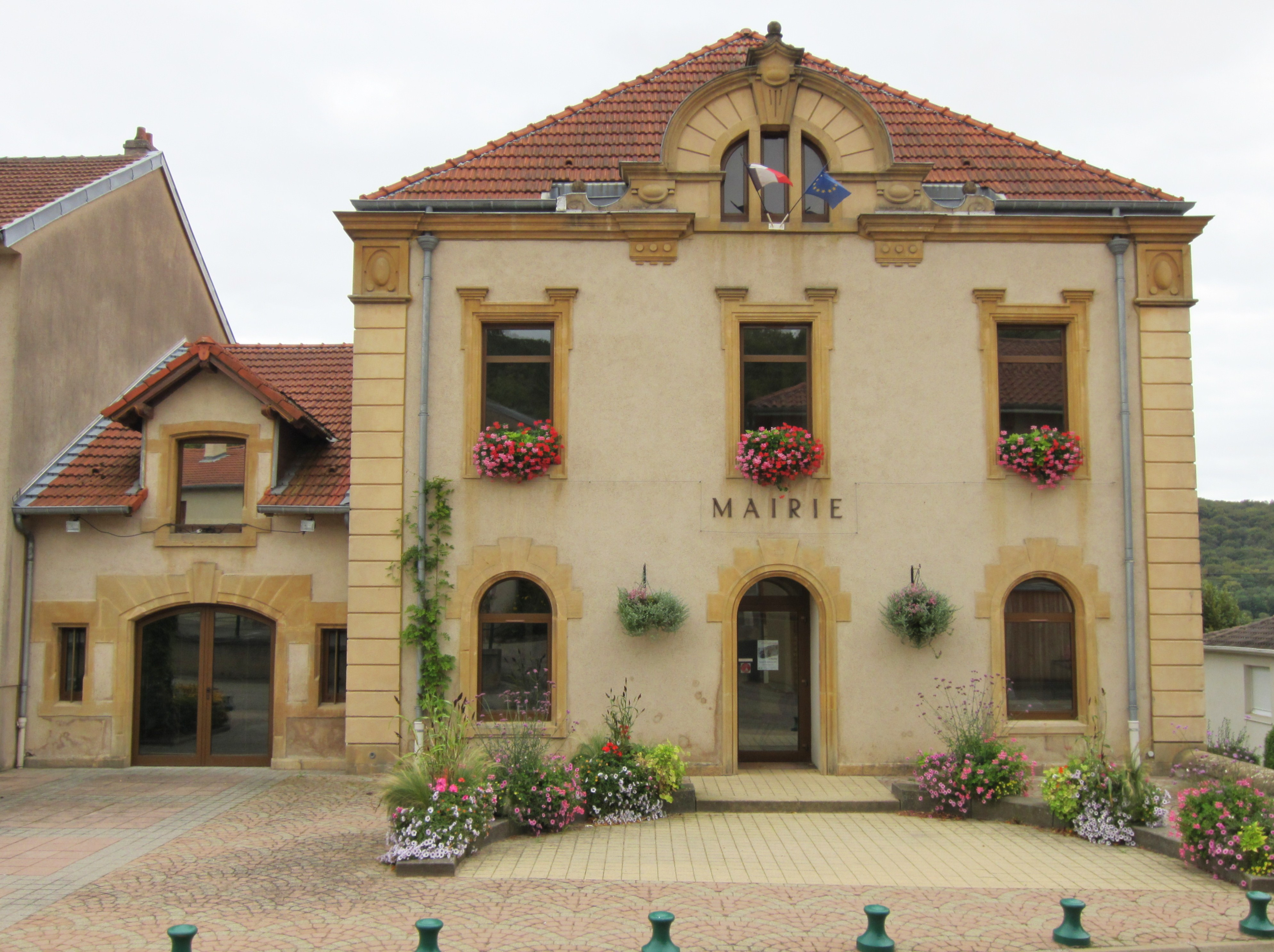
- The town hall in Saulny

- Coat of arms
- Location of Saulny
- Location within France Location within Grand Est
- Coordinates: 49°09′35″N 6°06′22″E
- Country: France
- Region: Grand Est
- Department: Moselle
- Arrondissement: Metz
- Canton: Rombas
- Intercommunality: Metz Métropole

Government
  - Mayor (2020–2026): Nathalie Spormeyeur
- Area^{1}: 9.79 km^{2} (3.78 sq mi)
- Elevation: 300 m (980 ft)
- Highest elevation: 377 m (1,237 ft)
- Lowest elevation: 185 m (607 ft)
- Population (2023): 1,590
  - Density: 162/km^{2} (421/sq mi)
- Time zone: UTC+01:00 (CET)
  - Summer (DST): UTC+02:00 (CEST)
- INSEE/Postal code: 57634 /57140
- ^{1} French Land Register data, which excludes lakes, ponds, glaciers > 1 km^{2} (0.386 sq mi or 247 acres) and river estuaries.

Saulny (French pronunciation: [so(l)ni]; German: Salnach) is a commune in the Moselle department in Grand Est in north-eastern France.

== See also ==
- Communes of the Moselle department
