= Plesnois =

- Commune
- Coat of arms
- Location of Plesnois
- Location within France Location within Grand Est
- Coordinates: 49°10′23″N 6°06′24″E
- Country: France
- Region: Grand Est
- Department: Moselle
- Arrondissement: Metz
- Canton: Rombas
- Intercommunality: CC Rives de Moselle

Government
  - Mayor (2020–2026): Marcel Jacques
- Area^{1}: 3.11 km^{2} (1.20 sq mi)
- Elevation: 240 m (790 ft)
- Highest elevation: 376 m (1,234 ft)
- Lowest elevation: 188 m (617 ft)
- Population (2023): 772
  - Density: 248/km^{2} (643/sq mi)
- Demonym(s): Plesnoissiens, Plesnoissiennes
- Time zone: UTC+01:00 (CET)
  - Summer (DST): UTC+02:00 (CEST)
- INSEE/Postal code: 57546 /57140
- Website: http://www.plesnois.com
- ^{1} French Land Register data, which excludes lakes, ponds, glaciers > 1 km^{2} (0.386 sq mi or 247 acres) and river estuaries.

Plesnois (French pronunciation: [plɛnwa]; German: Plenach) is a commune in the Moselle department in Grand Est in north-eastern France.

== See also ==
- Communes of the Moselle department
