= Norroy-le-Veneur =

- Commune
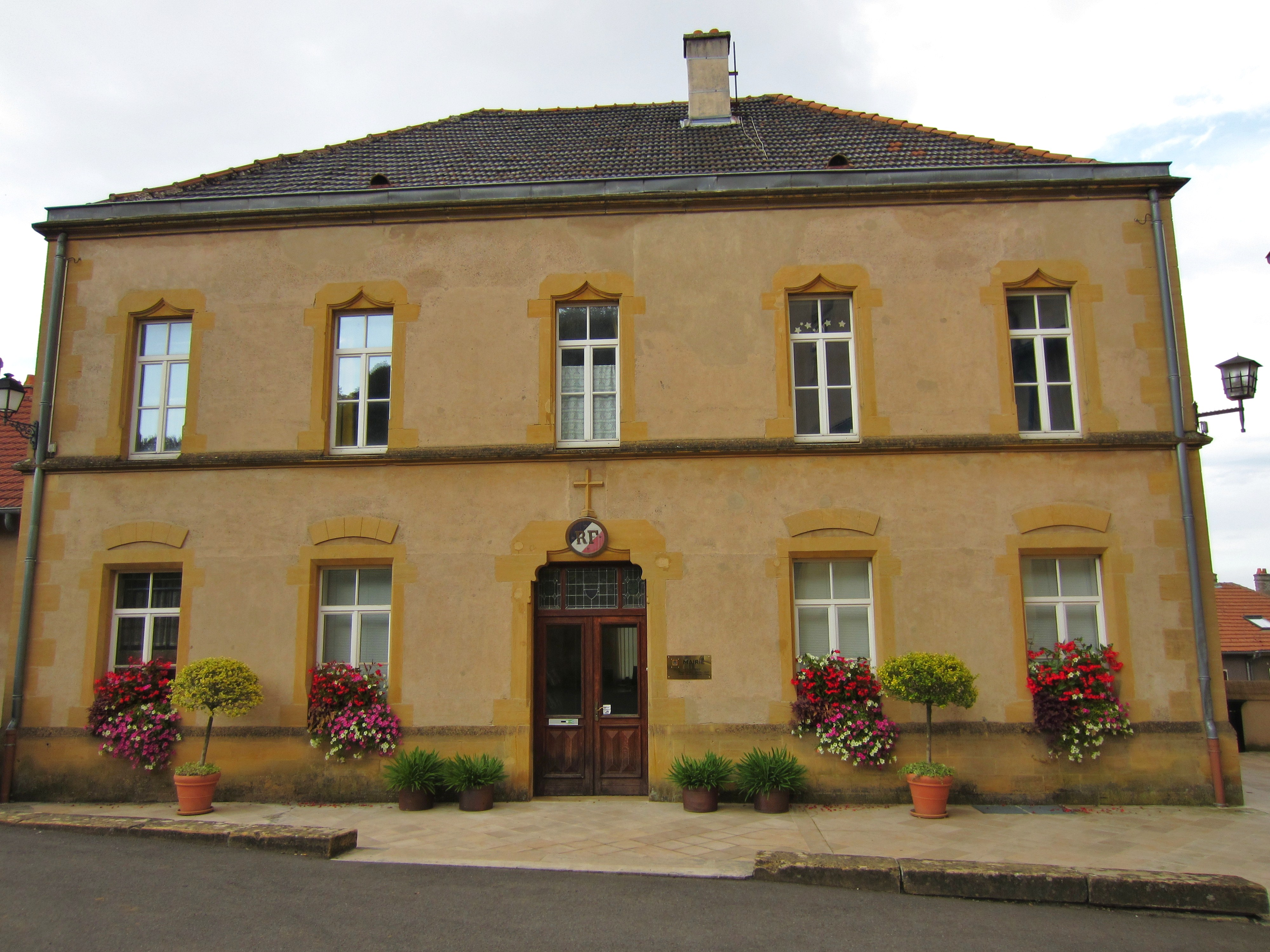
- The town hall in Norroy-le-Veneur

- Coat of arms
- Location of Norroy-le-Veneur
- Location within France Location within Grand Est
- Coordinates: 49°10′59″N 6°06′15″E
- Country: France
- Region: Grand Est
- Department: Moselle
- Arrondissement: Metz
- Canton: Rombas
- Intercommunality: CC Rives de Moselle

Government
  - Mayor (2020–2026): Nathalie Rousseau
- Area^{1}: 8.45 km^{2} (3.26 sq mi)
- Elevation: 240 m (790 ft)
- Highest elevation: 370 m (1,210 ft)
- Lowest elevation: 167 m (548 ft)
- Population (2023): 993
  - Density: 118/km^{2} (304/sq mi)
- Time zone: UTC+01:00 (CET)
  - Summer (DST): UTC+02:00 (CEST)
- INSEE/Postal code: 57511 /57140
- ^{1} French Land Register data, which excludes lakes, ponds, glaciers > 1 km^{2} (0.386 sq mi or 247 acres) and river estuaries.

Norroy-le-Veneur (French pronunciation: [nɔʁwa lə vənœʁ]; German: Norringen) is a commune in the Moselle department in Grand Est in north-eastern France.

== See also ==
- Communes of the Moselle department
