= Canton of Rombas =

Coordinates: 49.25°N 6.09°E

The canton of Rombas is an administrative division of the Moselle department, northeastern France. Its borders were modified at the French canton reorganisation which came into effect in March 2015. Its seat is in Rombas.

It consists of the following communes:

1. Amanvillers
2. Amnéville
3. Bronvaux
4. Fèves
5. Marange-Silvange
6. Montois-la-Montagne
7. Norroy-le-Veneur
8. Pierrevillers
9. Plesnois
10. Rombas
11. Roncourt
12. Sainte-Marie-aux-Chênes
13. Saint-Privat-la-Montagne
14. Saulny
