= Saint-Privat-la-Montagne =

- Commune
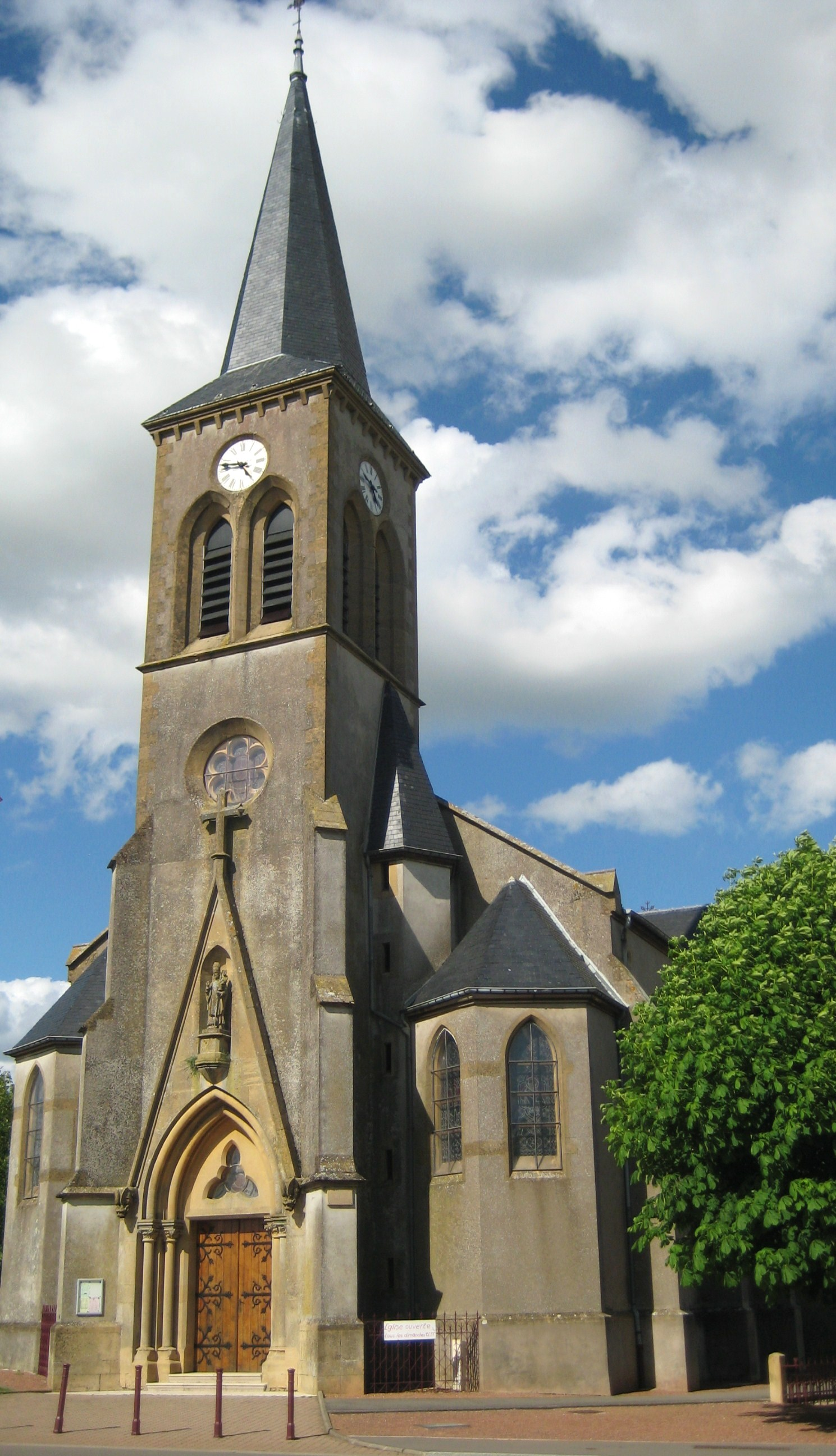
- The church in Saint-Privat-la-Montagne

- Coat of arms
- Location of Saint-Privat-la-Montagne
- Location within France Location within Grand Est
- Coordinates: 49°11′23″N 6°02′13″E
- Country: France
- Region: Grand Est
- Department: Moselle
- Arrondissement: Metz
- Canton: Rombas
- Intercommunality: Metz Métropole

Government
  - Mayor (2020–2026): Jean-Claude Walter
- Area^{1}: 5.84 km^{2} (2.25 sq mi)
- Elevation: 334 m (1,096 ft)
- Highest elevation: 342 m (1,122 ft)
- Lowest elevation: 280 m (920 ft)
- Population (2023): 1,878
  - Density: 322/km^{2} (833/sq mi)
- Time zone: UTC+01:00 (CET)
  - Summer (DST): UTC+02:00 (CEST)
- INSEE/Postal code: 57622 /57855
- ^{1} French Land Register data, which excludes lakes, ponds, glaciers > 1 km^{2} (0.386 sq mi or 247 acres) and river estuaries.

Saint-Privat-la-Montagne (French pronunciation: [sɛ̃ pʁiva la mɔ̃taɲ]; German: Sankt Privat) is a commune in the Moselle department in Grand Est in north-eastern France.

Saint-Privat was the scene of the battle of 18 August 1870 between the Germans under Prince Friedrich Karl of Prussia and the French under General Francois Certain Canrobert.

== See also ==
- Gravelotte
- Communes of the Moselle department
