= Marange-Silvange =

- Commune
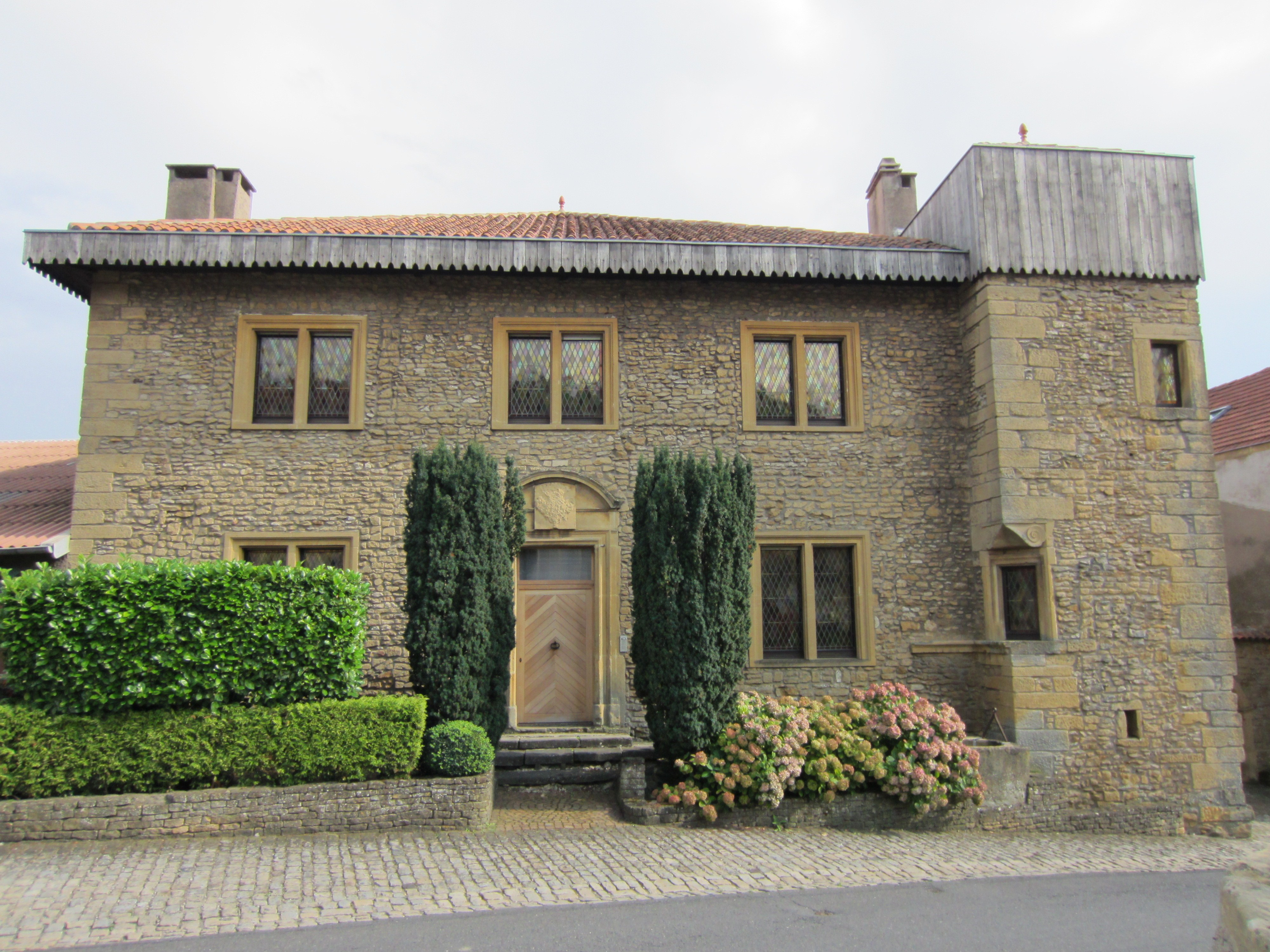
- The chateau in Marange

- Coat of arms
- Location of Marange-Silvange
- Location within France Location within Grand Est
- Coordinates: 49°12′57″N 6°07′00″E
- Country: France
- Region: Grand Est
- Department: Moselle
- Arrondissement: Metz
- Canton: Rombas
- Intercommunality: CC du Pays Orne Moselle

Government
  - Mayor (2020–2026): Yves Muller
- Area^{1}: 15.24 km^{2} (5.88 sq mi)
- Highest elevation: 377 m (1,237 ft)
- Lowest elevation: 168 m (551 ft)
- Population (2023): 6,539
  - Density: 429.1/km^{2} (1,111/sq mi)
- Time zone: UTC+01:00 (CET)
  - Summer (DST): UTC+02:00 (CEST)
- INSEE/Postal code: 57443 /57535
- ^{1} French Land Register data, which excludes lakes, ponds, glaciers > 1 km^{2} (0.386 sq mi or 247 acres) and river estuaries.

Marange-Silvange (French pronunciation: [maʁɑ̃ʒ silvɑ̃ʒ]; German: Maringen-Silvingen; Lorraine Franconian: Märéngen-Silwéngen) is a commune in the Moselle department in Grand Est in north-eastern France.

== Population ==
Historical population
Year	Pop.	±% p.a.
1968	5,033	—
1975	6,510	+3.74%
1982	5,538	−2.28%
1990	5,674	+0.30%
1999	5,402	−0.54%
2007	5,795	+0.88%
2012	5,810	+0.05%
2017	6,179	+1.24%
2023	6,539	+0.95%
Source: INSEE

== See also ==
- Communes of the Moselle department
