= Montois-la-Montagne =

- Commune
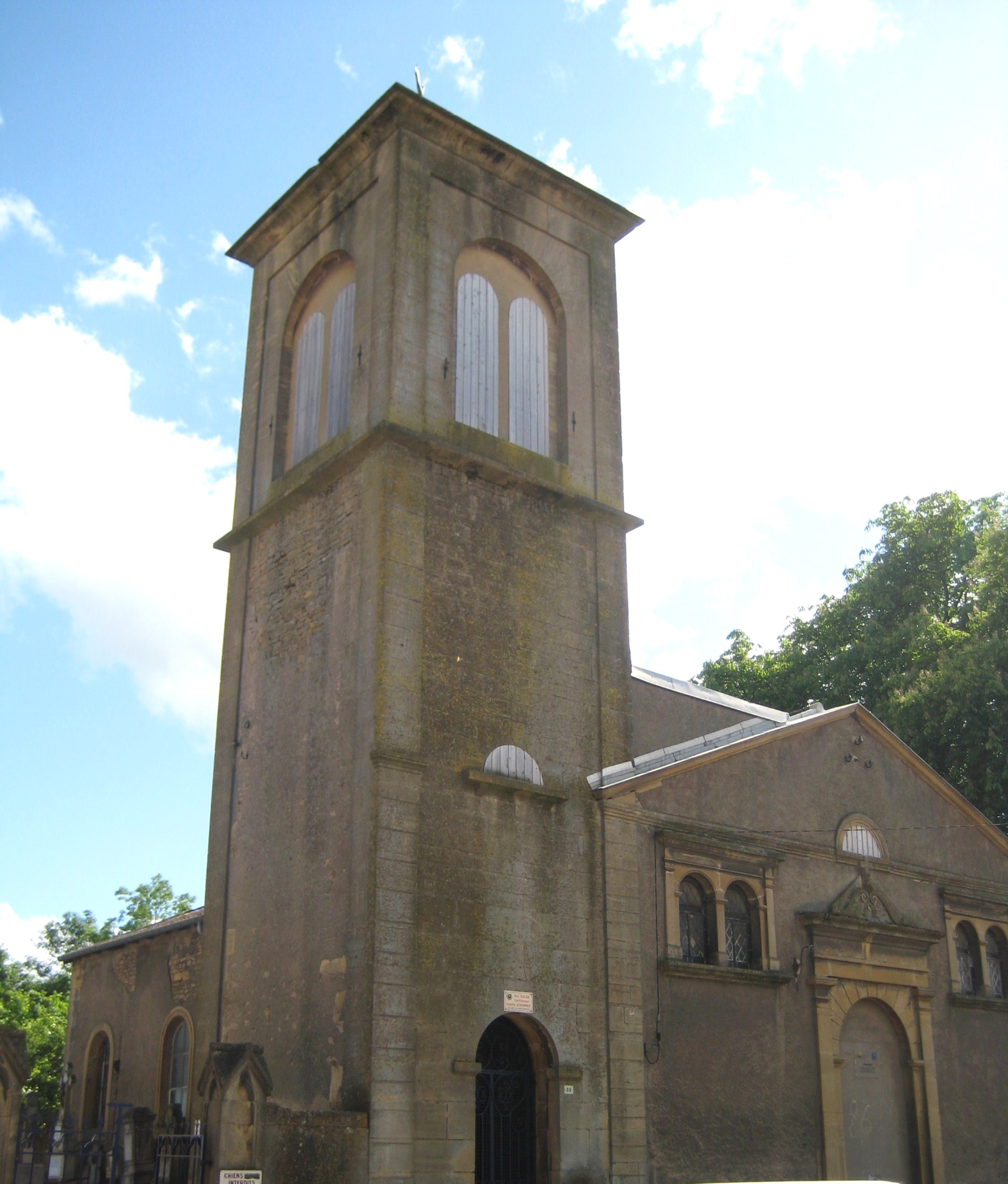
- The church in Montois-la-Montagne

- Coat of arms
- Location of Montois-la-Montagne
- Location within France Location within Grand Est
- Coordinates: 49°13′05″N 6°01′23″E
- Country: France
- Region: Grand Est
- Department: Moselle
- Arrondissement: Metz
- Canton: Rombas
- Intercommunality: CC du Pays Orne Moselle

Government
  - Mayor (2020–2026): Sophie Vanni
- Area^{1}: 7.1 km^{2} (2.7 sq mi)
- Elevation: 270 m (890 ft)
- Highest elevation: 330 m (1,080 ft)
- Lowest elevation: 174 m (571 ft)
- Population (2023): 2,711
  - Density: 380/km^{2} (990/sq mi)
- Time zone: UTC+01:00 (CET)
  - Summer (DST): UTC+02:00 (CEST)
- INSEE/Postal code: 57481 /57860
- ^{1} French Land Register data, which excludes lakes, ponds, glaciers > 1 km^{2} (0.386 sq mi or 247 acres) and river estuaries.

Montois-la-Montagne (French pronunciation: [mɔ̃twa la mɔ̃taɲ]) is a commune in the Moselle department in Grand Est in north-eastern France.

== Population ==
Historical population
Year	Pop.	±% p.a.
1968	2,654	—
1975	2,660	+0.03%
1982	2,291	−2.11%
1990	2,759	+2.35%
1999	2,616	−0.59%
2007	2,392	−1.11%
2012	2,380	−0.10%
2017	2,710	+2.63%
2023	2,711	+0.01%
Source: INSEE

== See also ==
- Communes of the Moselle department
