= Varangéville =

- Commune
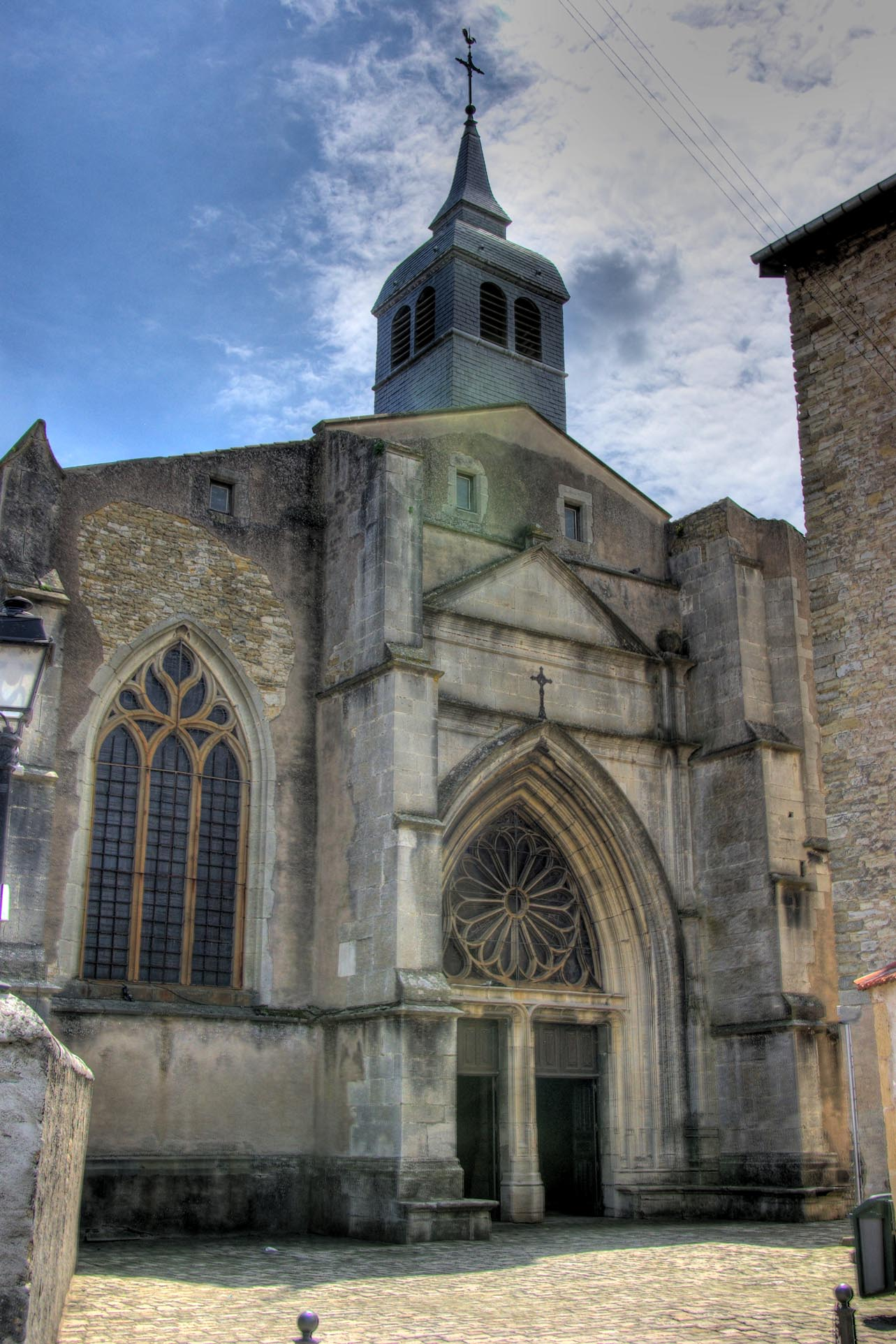
- The church in Varangéville

- Coat of arms
- Location of Varangéville
- Location within France Location within Grand Est
- Coordinates: 48°38′02″N 6°18′49″E
- Country: France
- Region: Grand Est
- Department: Meurthe-et-Moselle
- Arrondissement: Nancy
- Canton: Lunéville-1
- Intercommunality: CC Pays du Sel et du Vermois

Government
  - Mayor (2020–2026): Christopher Varin
- Area^{1}: 12.04 km^{2} (4.65 sq mi)
- Elevation: 207 m (679 ft)
- Highest elevation: 323 m (1,060 ft)
- Lowest elevation: 197 m (646 ft)
- Population (2023): 3,536
  - Density: 293.7/km^{2} (760.6/sq mi)
- Time zone: UTC+01:00 (CET)
  - Summer (DST): UTC+02:00 (CEST)
- INSEE/Postal code: 54549 /54110
- ^{1} French Land Register data, which excludes lakes, ponds, glaciers > 1 km^{2} (0.386 sq mi or 247 acres) and river estuaries.

Varangéville (French pronunciation: [vaʁɑ̃ʒevil]) is a commune in the Meurthe-et-Moselle département in north-eastern France.

== Population ==
Historical population
Year	Pop.	±% p.a.
1968	4,385	—
1975	4,301	−0.28%
1982	4,126	−0.59%
1990	4,001	−0.38%
1999	4,241	+0.65%
2007	4,103	−0.41%
2012	3,861	−1.21%
2017	3,652	−1.11%
2023	3,536	−0.54%
Source: INSEE

Inhabitants of Varangéville are known as Varangévillois(e)s in French.

== Social Housing ==
In 1963, many social housing projects were built to accommodate repatriates from Algeria, following the independence of many former French possessions around the world.

== See also ==
- Communes of the Meurthe-et-Moselle department
