= Roncourt =

- Commune
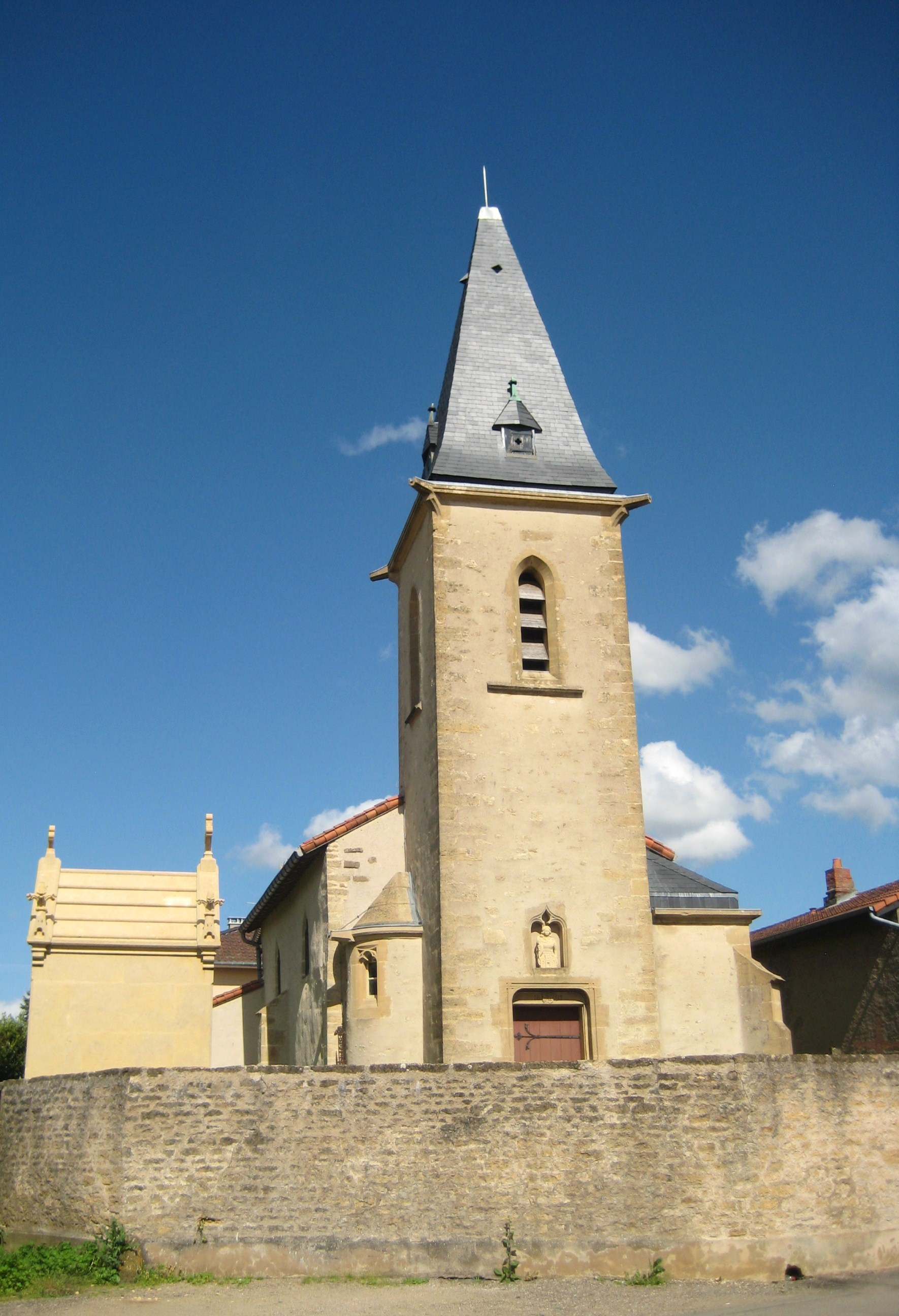
- The church in Roncourt

- Coat of arms
- Location of Roncourt
- Location within France Location within Grand Est
- Coordinates: 49°12′08″N 6°02′32″E
- Country: France
- Region: Grand Est
- Department: Moselle
- Arrondissement: Metz
- Canton: Rombas
- Intercommunality: Metz Métropole

Government
  - Mayor (2020–2026): Antoine Postera
- Area^{1}: 6.73 km^{2} (2.60 sq mi)
- Highest elevation: 357 m (1,171 ft)
- Lowest elevation: 249 m (817 ft)
- Population (2023): 1,058
  - Density: 157/km^{2} (407/sq mi)
- Time zone: UTC+01:00 (CET)
  - Summer (DST): UTC+02:00 (CEST)
- INSEE/Postal code: 57593 /57860
- ^{1} French Land Register data, which excludes lakes, ponds, glaciers > 1 km^{2} (0.386 sq mi or 247 acres) and river estuaries.

Roncourt (French pronunciation: [ʁɔ̃kuʁ]; German: Ronhofen) is a commune in the Moselle department in Grand Est in north-eastern France.

== See also ==
- Communes of the Moselle department
