= Amanvillers =

- Commune
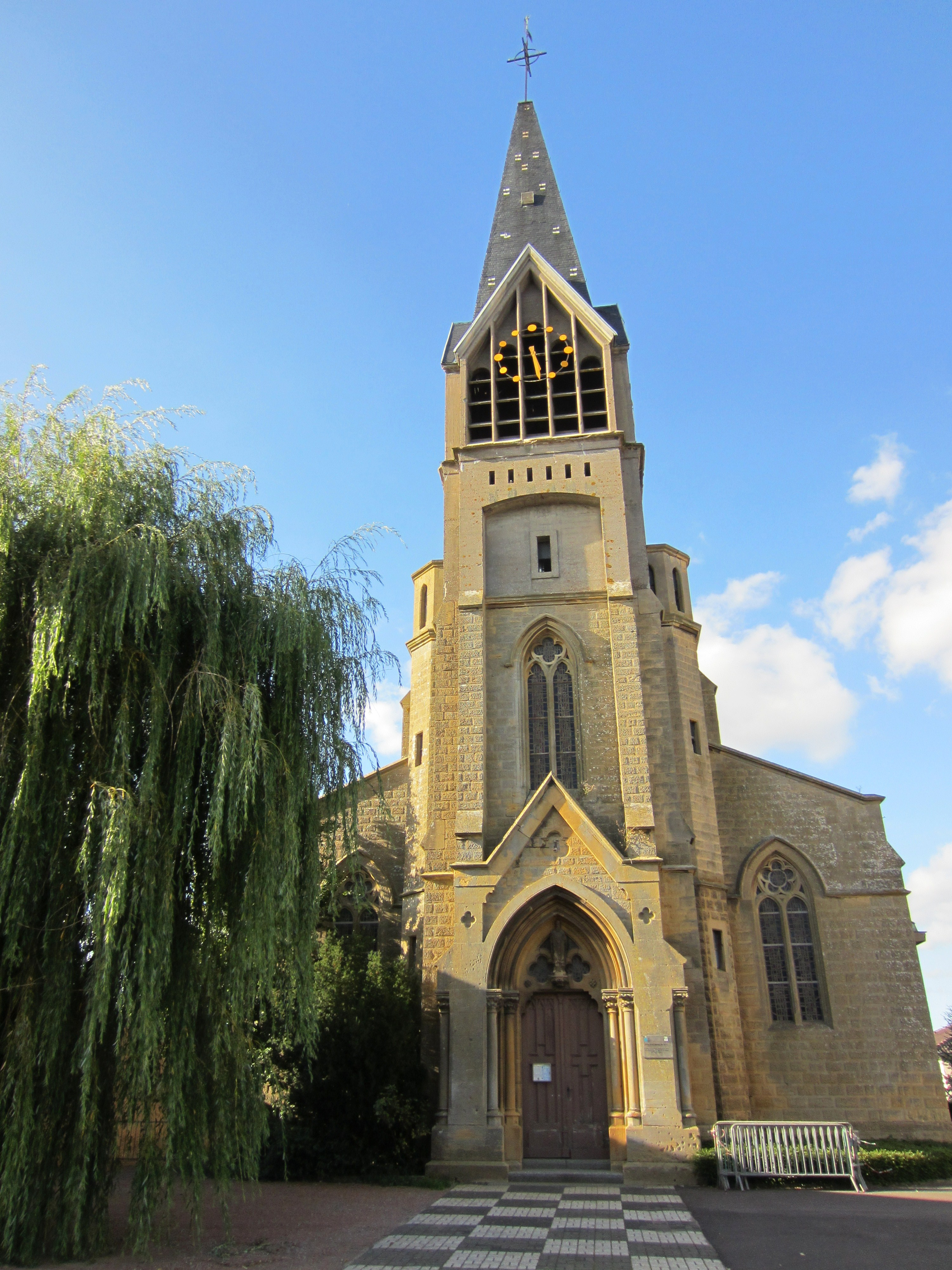
- The church in Amanvillers

- Coat of arms
- Location of Amanvillers
- Location within France Location within Grand Est
- Coordinates: 49°10′03″N 6°02′37″E
- Country: France
- Region: Grand Est
- Department: Moselle
- Arrondissement: Metz
- Canton: Rombas
- Intercommunality: Metz Métropole

Government
  - Mayor (2020–2026): Frédérique Login
- Area^{1}: 9.76 km^{2} (3.77 sq mi)
- Elevation: 325 m (1,066 ft)
- Highest elevation: 362 m (1,188 ft)
- Lowest elevation: 245 m (804 ft)
- Population (2023): 2,188
  - Density: 224/km^{2} (581/sq mi)
- Time zone: UTC+01:00 (CET)
  - Summer (DST): UTC+02:00 (CEST)
- INSEE/Postal code: 57017 /57865
- ^{1} French Land Register data, which excludes lakes, ponds, glaciers > 1 km^{2} (0.386 sq mi or 247 acres) and river estuaries.

Amanvillers (French pronunciation: [amɑ̃vile]; German: Amanweiler) is a commune in the Moselle department in Grand Est in northeastern France.

== Population ==
Historical population
Year	Pop.	±% p.a.
1968	1,043	—
1975	1,235	+2.44%
1982	1,456	+2.38%
1990	1,784	+2.57%
1999	1,934	+0.90%
2007	2,143	+1.29%
2012	2,196	+0.49%
2017	2,161	−0.32%
2023	2,188	+0.21%
Source: INSEE

== See also ==
- Communes of the Moselle department
