= Sainte-Marie-aux-Chênes =

- Commune
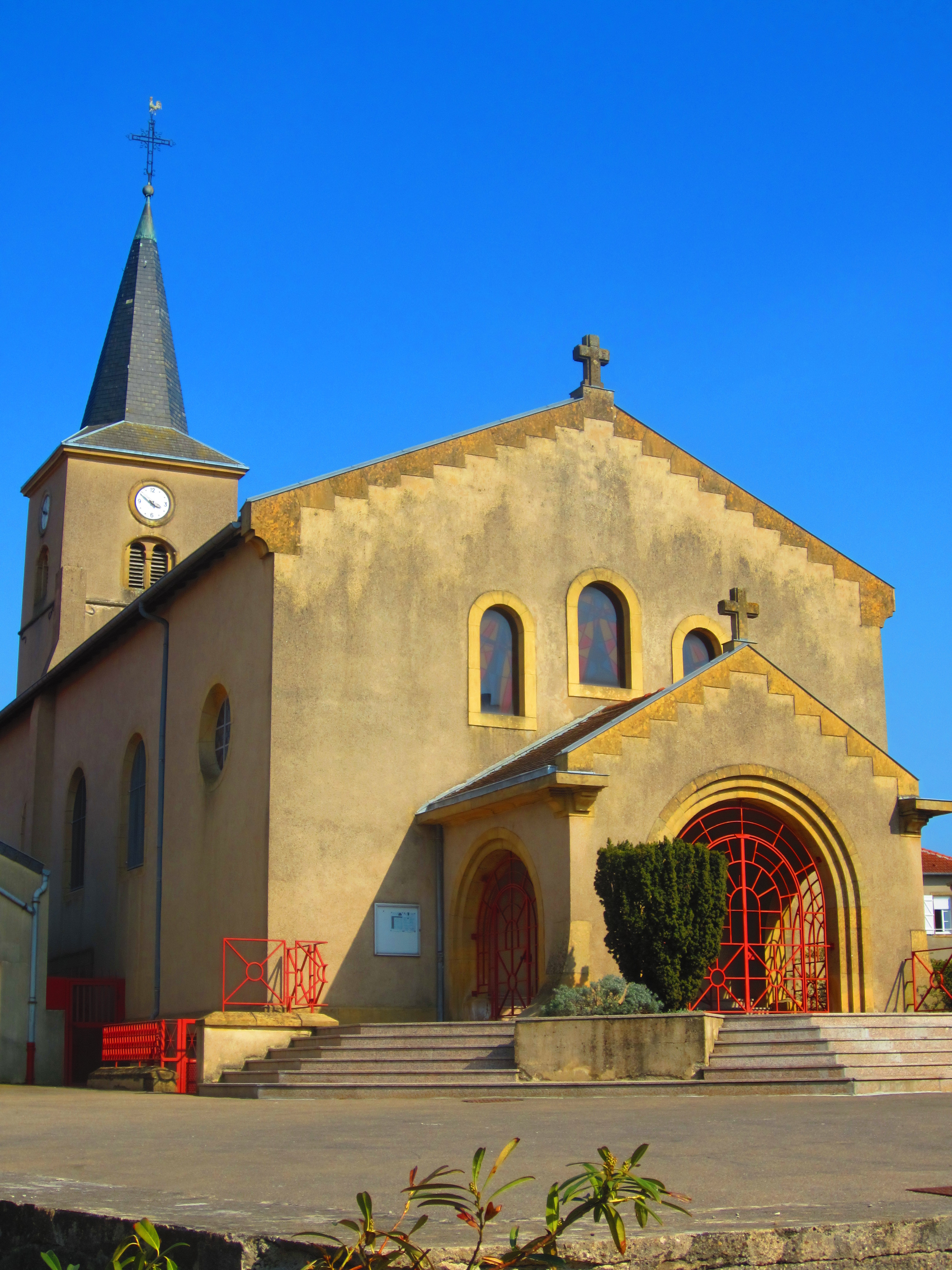
- The church in Sainte-Marie-aux-Chênes

- Coat of arms
- Location of Sainte-Marie-aux-Chênes
- Location within France Location within Grand Est
- Coordinates: 49°11′32″N 6°00′11″E
- Country: France
- Region: Grand Est
- Department: Moselle
- Arrondissement: Metz
- Canton: Rombas
- Intercommunality: Pays Orne-Moselle

Government
  - Mayor (2020–2026): Sylvie Lamarque
- Area^{1}: 10.19 km^{2} (3.93 sq mi)
- Elevation: 290 m (950 ft)
- Highest elevation: 323 m (1,060 ft)
- Lowest elevation: 205 m (673 ft)
- Population (2023): 4,519
  - Density: 443.5/km^{2} (1,149/sq mi)
- Time zone: UTC+01:00 (CET)
  - Summer (DST): UTC+02:00 (CEST)
- INSEE/Postal code: 57620 /57255
- ^{1} French Land Register data, which excludes lakes, ponds, glaciers > 1 km^{2} (0.386 sq mi or 247 acres) and river estuaries.

Sainte-Marie-aux-Chênes (French: [sɛ̃t maʁi o ʃɛːn]; German: Marieneichen) is a commune in the Moselle department in Grand Est in north-eastern France.

== Population ==
Historical population
Year	Pop.	±% p.a.
1968	3,365	—
1975	3,326	−0.17%
1982	3,317	−0.04%
1990	3,302	−0.06%
1999	3,328	+0.09%
2007	3,589	+0.95%
2012	3,959	+1.98%
2017	4,216	+1.27%
2023	4,519	+1.16%
Source: INSEE

== Coat of arms ==
The town's name means "Saint Mary at the oaks" in French, and the town's coat of arms can be described as canting: Azure an oak tree eradicated or, between two letters S and M of the last.

== See also ==
- Communes of the Moselle department
