= Canton of Volmunster =

Former canton in Moselle, France

Coordinates: 49°06′54″N 7°19′40″E

- Former canton
- Location of the canton in the arrondissement of Sarreguemines
- Country: France
- Region: Grand Est
- Department: Moselle
- No. of communes: {{{nbcomm}}}
- Disbanded: 2015

Government
  - Representatives: David Suck (NC)
- Area: 132.52 km^{2} (51.17 sq mi)
- Population (2012): 6,185
  - Density: 46.67/km^{2} (120.9/sq mi)

The canton of Volmunster (French: Canton de Volmunster) is a former French canton located in the department of Moselle in the Lorraine region (now part of Grand Est). This canton was organized around Volmunster in the arrondissement of Sarreguemines. It is now part of the canton of Bitche.

The last general councillor from this canton was David Suck (NC), elected in 2008.

== Composition ==
The canton of Volmunster grouped together 16 municipalities and had 6,185 inhabitants (2012 census without double counts).

1. Bousseviller
2. Breidenbach
3. Epping
4. Erching
5. Hottviller
6. Lengelsheim
7. Loutzviller
8. Nousseviller-lès-Bitche
9. Obergailbach
10. Ormersviller
11. Rimling
12. Rolbing
13. Schweyen
14. Volmunster
15. Waldhouse
16. Walschbronn
