= Canton of Rohrbach-lès-Bitche =

Former canton in Moselle, France

Coordinates: 49°02′18″N 7°13′51″E

- Former canton
- Location of the canton in the arrondissement of Sarreguemines
- Country: France
- Region: Grand Est
- Department: Moselle
- No. of communes: {{{nbcomm}}}
- Disbanded: 2015

Government
  - Representatives: Daniel Zintz
- Area: 182.18 km^{2} (70.34 sq mi)
- Population (2012): 15,892
  - Density: 87.232/km^{2} (225.93/sq mi)

The canton of Rohrbach-lès-Bitche (French: Canton de Rohrbach-lès-Bitche) is a former French canton located in the department of Moselle in the Lorraine region (now part of Grand Est). This canton was organized around Rohrbach-lès-Bitche in the arrondissement of Sarreguemines. It is now part of the canton of Bitche.

The last general councillor from this canton was Daniel Zintz (UMP), elected in 2001.

== Composition ==
The canton of Rohrbach-lès-Bitche grouped together 15 municipalities and had 15,892 inhabitants (2012 census without double counts).

1. Achen
2. Bettviller
3. Bining
4. Enchenberg
5. Etting
6. Gros-Réderching
7. Kalhausen
8. Lambach
9. Montbronn
10. Petit-Réderching
11. Rahling
12. Rohrbach-lès-Bitche
13. Schmittviller
14. Siersthal
15. Soucht
