= Montbronn =

- Commune
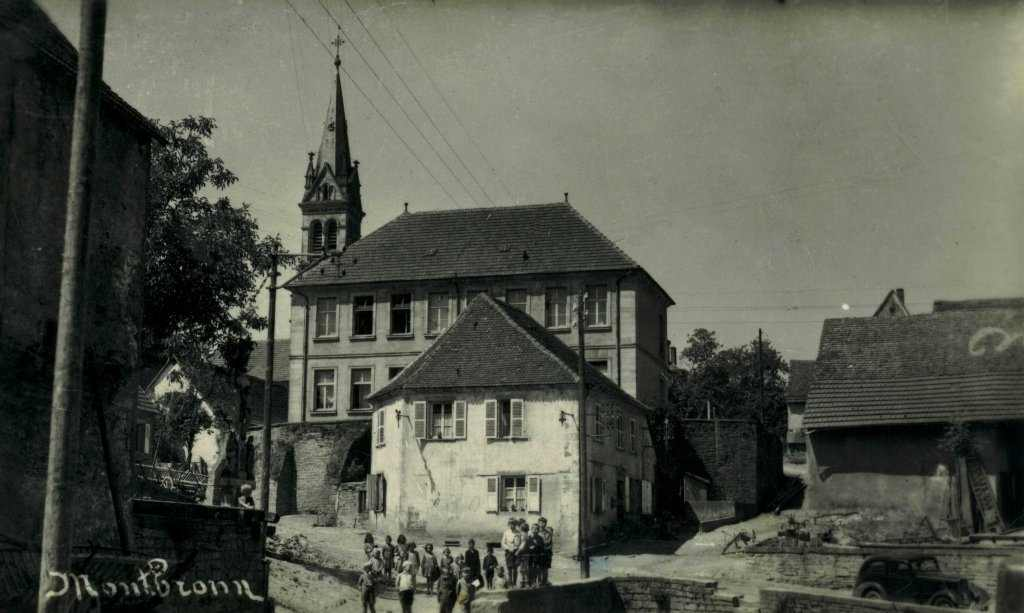
- Village view

- Coat of arms
- Location of Montbronn
- Location within France Location within Grand Est
- Coordinates: 48°59′42″N 7°18′38″E
- Country: France
- Region: Grand Est
- Department: Moselle
- Arrondissement: Sarreguemines
- Canton: Bitche
- Intercommunality: CC du Pays de Bitche

Government
  - Mayor (2020–2026): Manuel Mayer
- Area^{1}: 14.99 km^{2} (5.79 sq mi)
- Elevation: 360 m (1,180 ft)
- Highest elevation: 381 m (1,250 ft)
- Lowest elevation: 238 m (781 ft)
- Population (2023): 1,578
  - Density: 105.3/km^{2} (272.6/sq mi)
- Time zone: UTC+01:00 (CET)
  - Summer (DST): UTC+02:00 (CEST)
- INSEE/Postal code: 57477 /57415
- Website: montbronn.fr
- ^{1} French Land Register data, which excludes lakes, ponds, glaciers > 1 km^{2} (0.386 sq mi or 247 acres) and river estuaries.

Montbronn (French pronunciation: [mɔ̃bʁɔn]; German: Mombronn; Lorraine Franconian: Mumere) is a commune in the Moselle department of the Grand Est administrative region in north-eastern France.

The village belongs to the Pays de Bitche and to the Northern Vosges Regional Nature Park.

== Geography ==
=== Location ===
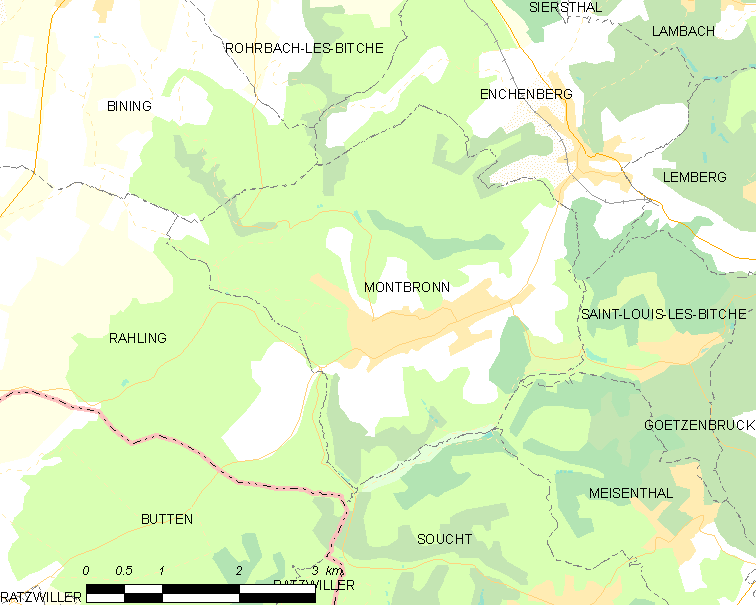
Montbronn's municipal territory

Located east of the Moselle department, the commune is part of the Pays de Bitche; It borders the neighboring Bas-Rhin department, a territory also known as Alsace bossue.

The village is located 11 kilometres (6.8 mi) south-west of Bitche, the county's chief town, 21.8 kilometres (13.5 mi) south-east of Sarreguemines, the arrondissement's subprefecture, about 83 kilometres (52 mi) east of Metz, the department's prefecture and about 56 kilometres (35 mi) north-west of Strasbourg, the region's prefecture. Neighboring communes include Rahling to the west, Bining, Rohrbach-lès-Bitche and Enchenberg to the north, Saint-Louis-lès-Bitche and Meisenthal to the east, and Soucht to the south.

=== Neighbouring communes and villages ===
Source:

=== Communications ===
==== Road network ====
The town is crossed from west to east (Main Street) by the D83 which connects Kalhausen to Enchenberg. This road crosses both the D110F and the D36A in the village, linking it to respectively Rohrbach-lès-Bitche and Lemberg. Thoses roads are later extended by several county roads. The nearest entrance to the Autoroute de L'Est (A4 autoroute) is via the D83 through the Sarre-Union interchange at Thal-Drulingen.

==== Public transport ====
The Sarreguemines–Bitche railway line has passed through the neighboring commune of Enchenberg from 1869 to 2014. The railway line is now disused and has been replaced by a TER Grand Est bus line. Today, the nearest SNCF station is in Diemeringen, served by the Sarreguemines–Strasbourg railway line.

School buses to the Lemberg collège (middle school) and to the collèges and lycées (middle and high schools) of Bitche are available during school terms.

== Administration ==
Situation of Montbronn (red) in the Bitche canton.

=== Canton and intercommunality ===
Montbronn is one of 46 communes in the canton of Bitche. Its general counsels since the French legislative election of 2012 are Anne Mazuy-Harter (DVD) and David Suck (UDI).

The town is part of the Pays de Bitche federation of municipalities which as of 1 January 2017 consists of the same 46 communes as the canton. This grouping is headed by Francis Vogt, municipal counsel of Bitche.

=== List of successive mayors ===
From	To	Name	Party
1977	2020	Francis Sidot	independent
2020	2026	Manuel Mayer	

== Population ==
The inhabitants of the commune are known as Montbronnois or Montbronnoises in French.

Historical population

Year	Pop.	±% p.a.
1793	960	—
1800	959	−0.01%
1806	1,323	+5.51%
1821	1,500	+0.84%
1836	1,595	+0.41%
1841	1,711	+1.41%
1861	1,739	+0.08%
1866	1,708	−0.36%
1871	1,618	−1.08%
1875	1,533	−1.34%
1880	1,430	−1.38%
1885	1,486	+0.77%
1890	1,538	+0.69%
1895	1,612	+0.94%
1900	1,623	+0.14%
1905	1,742	+1.43%
1910	1,757	+0.17%

Year	Pop.	±% p.a.
1921	1,652	−0.56%
1926	1,657	+0.06%
1931	1,643	−0.17%
1936	1,673	+0.36%
1946	1,627	−0.28%
1954	1,540	−0.68%
1962	1,649	+0.86%
1968	1,755	+1.04%
1975	1,791	+0.29%
1982	1,743	−0.39%
1990	1,698	−0.33%
1999	1,668	−0.20%
2007	1,671	+0.02%
2012	1,661	−0.12%
2017	1,630	−0.38%
2023	1,578	−0.54%

Source: EHESS and INSEE

== Local life ==
=== Language ===
The majority of the inhabitants can speak and/or understand German and also speak French. The local dialect is known as Lorraine Franconian. Lorraine Franconian is a dialect of German that has been spoken and developed in the region for over a thousand years.

=== Education ===
Montbronn depends on the Academy of Nancy-Metz.

The village is provided with a preschool (French: école maternelle) and a primary school (French: école primaire).

Studies then go on at the collège La Paraison in Lemberg. To pursue their studies in high school, young Montbronnois mainly go to Bitche or Sarreguemines.

=== Health ===
Two general practitioners reside in Montbronn. Thus, both a medical home and a pharmacy are located in the village. As for hospitals, they are located in Bitche, Ingwiller, Sarreguemines, Saverne, Haguenau and Strasbourg.

== See also ==
=== Bibliography ===
- Beck, Joël (1988). Rohrbach-lès-Bitche et son canton (in French) (Éditions Pierron ed.). Sarreguemines.
- Beck, Joël (1999). Moulins : huileries, tailleries, scieries du pays de Bitche (in French) (Éditions Pierron ed.). Sarreguemines.
- Beck, Joël (2004). Le canton de Rohrbach-lès-Bitche (in French) (Éditions Sutton ed.).
- Beck, Joël (2005). Le Pays de Bitche 1900-1939 (in French) (Éditions Sutton ed.).
- Conrad, Joseph (2000). Jung, Peter (ed.). Les habitants de Montbronn (in French).
- Glath, Paul-Édouard (1997). Du pays de Bitche en Charente-Maritime : Souvenirs de 1939-40 (in French).
- Jacops, Marie-France; Guillaume, Jacques; Hemmert, Didier (1998). Le Pays de Bitche (Moselle) (in French) (Éditions Serpenoise ed.). Metz. pp. 81–82.
- Kochert, Francis; Michaux, Laurette; Michaux, Gérard (2008). Moselle : Metz et le pays messin, pays de Bitche, Nied, Sarrebourg, Saulnois, trois frontières et bassin houiller (in French).
- Marcus, Adolphe (1887). Les verreries du comté de Bitche [essai historique] (in French) (imprimerie de Berger-Levrault ed.). Nancy. pp. 155–156.
- Mazerang, Albert (2013). Les cloches de Montbronn (in French).
- Charpentier, Nöelle-Vix (2011). Plan local d'urbanisme de Montbronn [Rapport de présentation] (PDF) (in French). Metz. Archived from the original (PDF) on 31 May 2016.
- Schaefer, Joseph (2004). Le Pays de Bitche, passionnément (in French).
- Schutz, André (1992). Bitche et son pays (in French).

=== Related articles ===
- Communes of the Moselle department
- Pays de Bitche
