= Pays de Bitche =

Pays de Bitche Bitscherland / Bitcherland
- Natural region
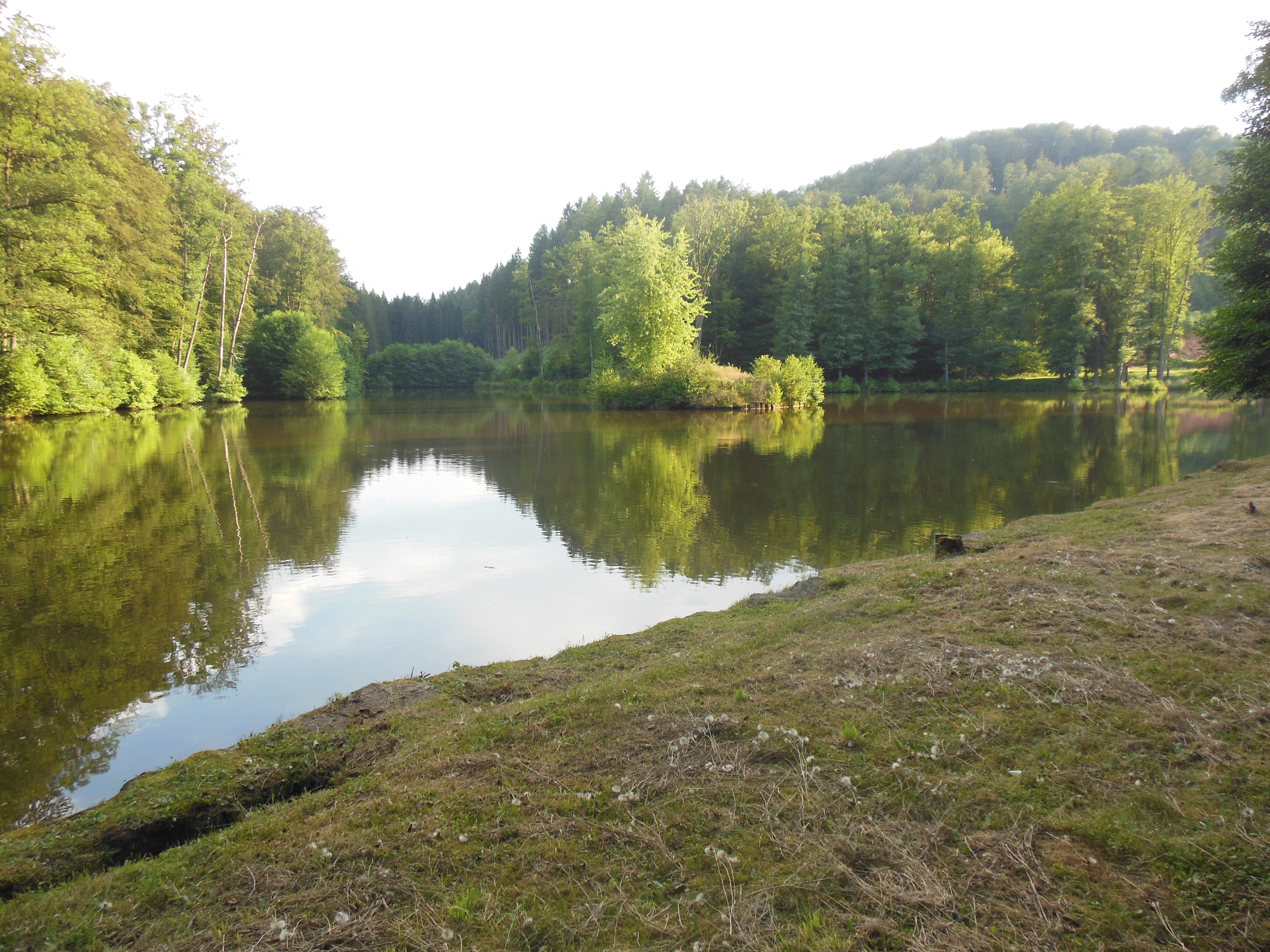
- Pond between Lambach and Lemberg

- Location within France
- Coordinates: 49.0525°N 7.42583333333°E
- Country: France
- Region: Grand Est
- Department: Moselle
- Arrondissement: Sarreguemines
- Capital: Bitche

Area
  - Total: 61,589 km^{2} (23,780 sq mi)

Population (1999)
  - Total: 35,873
  - Density: 0.58246/km^{2} (1.5086/sq mi)
- Demonym: Bitscherlänner / Bitcherlänner
- Vehicle registration: 57
- Website: tourisme-paysdebitche.fr

The Pays de Bitche (French pronunciation: [pe.i də bitʃ], literally Land of Bitche, German: Bitscherland or Bitcherland) is a natural region in the Moselle department of the Grand Est region of France. It corresponds to the present French part of the former principality of Zweibrücken-Bitsch and to the part of the Northern Vosges that lies within Lorraine.

The Pays de Bitche has a total of 47 municipalities. 46 of them are gathered into the Bitche canton and the remaining one, Kalhausen, is a part of the Sarreguemines canton.

== Geography ==
The Pays de Bitche has a total of 47 municipalities and covers the part of the Northern Vosges Regional Nature Park that lies within Lorraine. In the west and southwest it forms part of the agriculturally dominated Westrich Plateau. To the south it borders the so-called Alsace bossue (German: Krumme Elsass), which belongs to the arrondissement of Saverne. To the east is the canton of Wissembourg. To the north it is adjoined by the German states of Rhineland-Palatinate and the Saarland, whilst to the west it is bounded by the cantons of Sarralbe and Sarreguemines, both of the arrondissement of Sarreguemines, to which the Pays de Bitche also belongs. To the west it also reaches the River Saar. The north-south line from Liederschiedt to Rahling delineates the very sharp divide between its different landscapes. West of this line, the bedrock is almost exclusively characterised by limestone, whilst east of the line, stretch forested bunter sandstone hills, dissected by deep valleys. Since the 16th century many ponds and lakes have been laid out in this area, mostly for agricultural and industrial purposes.

The main streams—the Schwalb, Bickenalb and Horn—run predominantly in a south to north direction and drain via the Blies into the Saar.

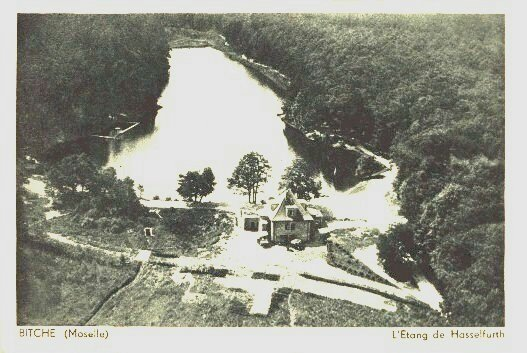
The Hasselfurth pond in eastern Pays de Bitche dating from the period before the Second World War

The Falkensteinerbach and the Zinsel du Nord, which have their sources in the region around Lemberg, run southeast towards the Rhine. To the west flows the Achen, which discharges into the Saar near Kalhausen. The lowest point in the Pays de Bitche is Baerenthal on the Zinsel du Nord (190 m). The highest point, at 510 metres above sea level - is not far from it at Garnfirst near Philippsbourg right on the boundary with the canton of Niederbronn-les-Bains.

== History ==
=== Middle Ages ===
As in the whole surrounding region, there are numerous traces of Roman times in the Pays de Bitche, for example, around Bettviller. Its actual recorded history began, however, with the Treaty of Verdun in 843 A.D., which resulted in the founding of the princedom of Lotharingia in 855. In the 13th century, in view of its scattered territory, Eberhard I of Zweibrücken, co-regent Walram I and Simon II organized an exchange of land with the Duchy of Lorraine that was enshrined in the treaties of 13 May 1297 and 1 Jul 1302 and sealed the rearrangement of territorial lordship in the area.

=== County of Zweibrücken-Bitsch to 1604 ===
In 1333, the House of Zweibrücken-Bitsch was established when Eberhard and his brother, Walram II, agreed on a division of the County of Zweibrücken into two fairly homogeneous areas. This may be considered as the birth of the Pays de Bitche as a historical region, albeit at that time it encompassed a larger area that today has become the Saarland municipalities of Gersheim and Blieskastel and the collective municipality of Pirmasens-Land in the Zweibrücken Hills that belongs to the German state of Rhineland-Palatinate. Even in the 19th century, the term "German-Lorraine" was common for this landscape. The seat of this new domain was initially in Lemberg, but soon afterwards it moved to Bitche. In 1447, Bitsch was occupied by Lords James and William of Lützelstein. This occupation generated general disapproval in the territory and eventually led to the extinction of the Barony of Lützelstein in 1452. At the beginning of the 16th century the Peasants' War broke out in the area around Bitche, Hans Zoller from the village of Rimling being the regional ringleader of the movement. The castles in Bitche and Lemberg, as well as Sturzelbronn Abbey went up in flames. However, the Peasants' War ended with the defeat of the peasants and their massacre by the princes who put the rebellion down.

In 1559, Count James inherited the Barony of Ochsenstein, which had been ruled by the branch line of Zweibrücken-Bitsch-Ochsenstein since 1485. He was the last Count of Zweibrücken-Bitsch and, with him, the line died out in 1570. Entitled to inherit were his daughter and his niece, the former marrying Count Philip I of Leiningen-Westerburg, the latter marrying Count Philip V of Hanau-Lichtenberg. As a result, Lorraine recognized the inheritance rights of Hanau-Lichtenberg. In 1572, Philip V introduced the Reformation, however, and all his estates had to convert to the Lutheran confession. In 1572, because of complaints by the Abbot of Stürzelbronn, he was summoned to the Duke of Lorraine. When he refused to appear, the southern part of the Pays de Bitche – the area of the three present cantons and a few municipalities in present-day Saarland – were occupied by Lorraine and returned to the Catholic faith. Philip, who could not match the military might of Lorraine, then took legal action, taking his case to the Imperial Chamber Court. However, he was unsuccessful because, in the treaties of 1297/1302, Lorraine had been granted suzerainty.

In the early 17th century, Lorraine was involved in border agreements with neighbouring states. As early as 1601 its border with the Duchy of Palatinate-Zweibrücken was established at a meeting in Hornbach and led to the establishment of surveying (Aussteinung). This surveying is still carried out today at certain intervals by representatives of the arrondissement of Sarreguemines and the county of Südwestpfalz. On 6 Feb 1604 this was followed by a border treaty with the County of Hanau-Lichtenberg. In the Lorraine part of the Pays de Bitche there are still 68 villages. For the most part this established the present border between France and Germany in this area.

=== The Lorraine Pays de Bitche ===
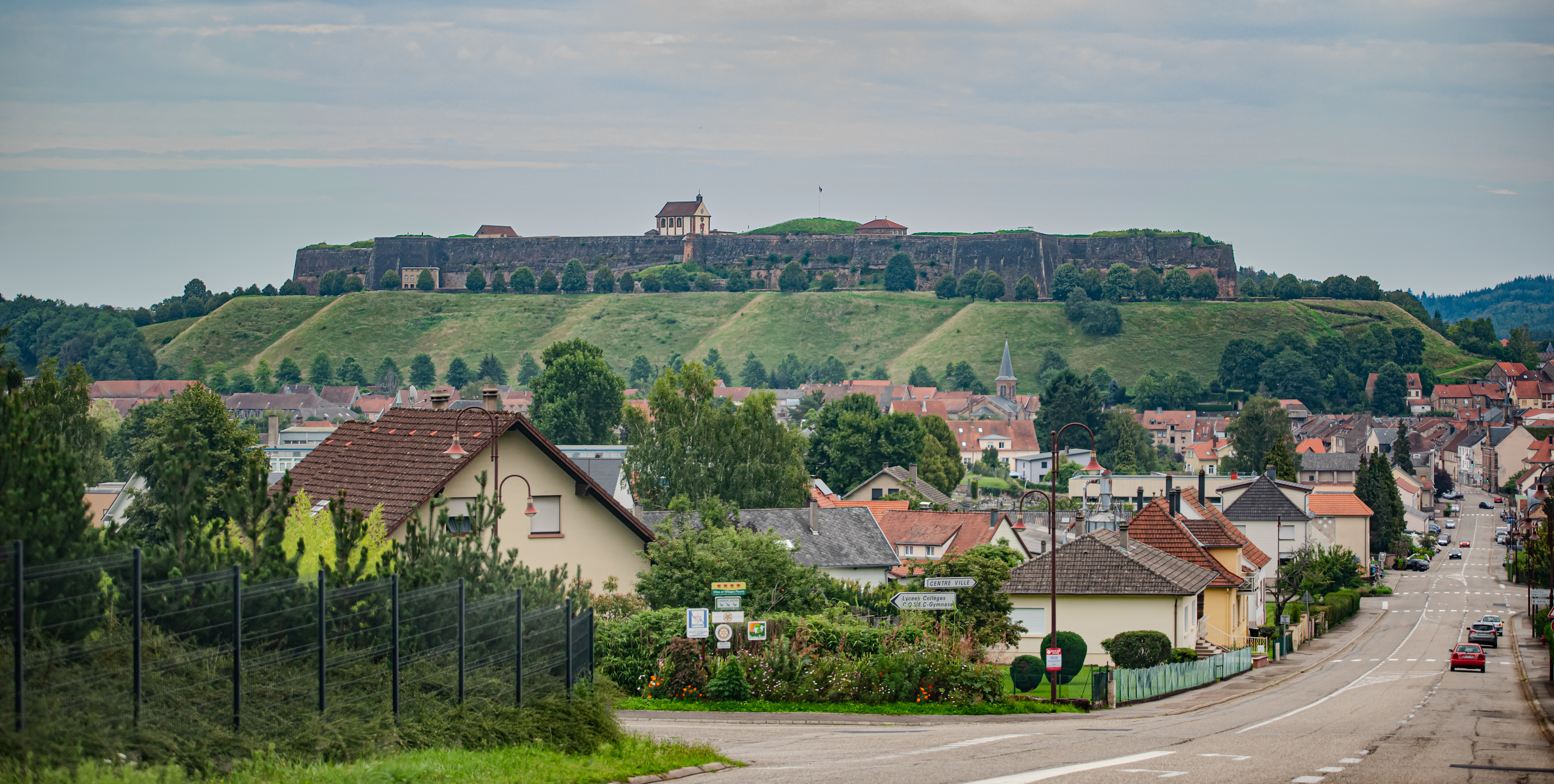
Citadel of Bitche

Its administration was modernised, its jurisdiction re-regulated and there was then initially a definite economic boom that had, however, turned into a long-lasting recession in the 2nd quarter of the 17th century.

== Communes ==
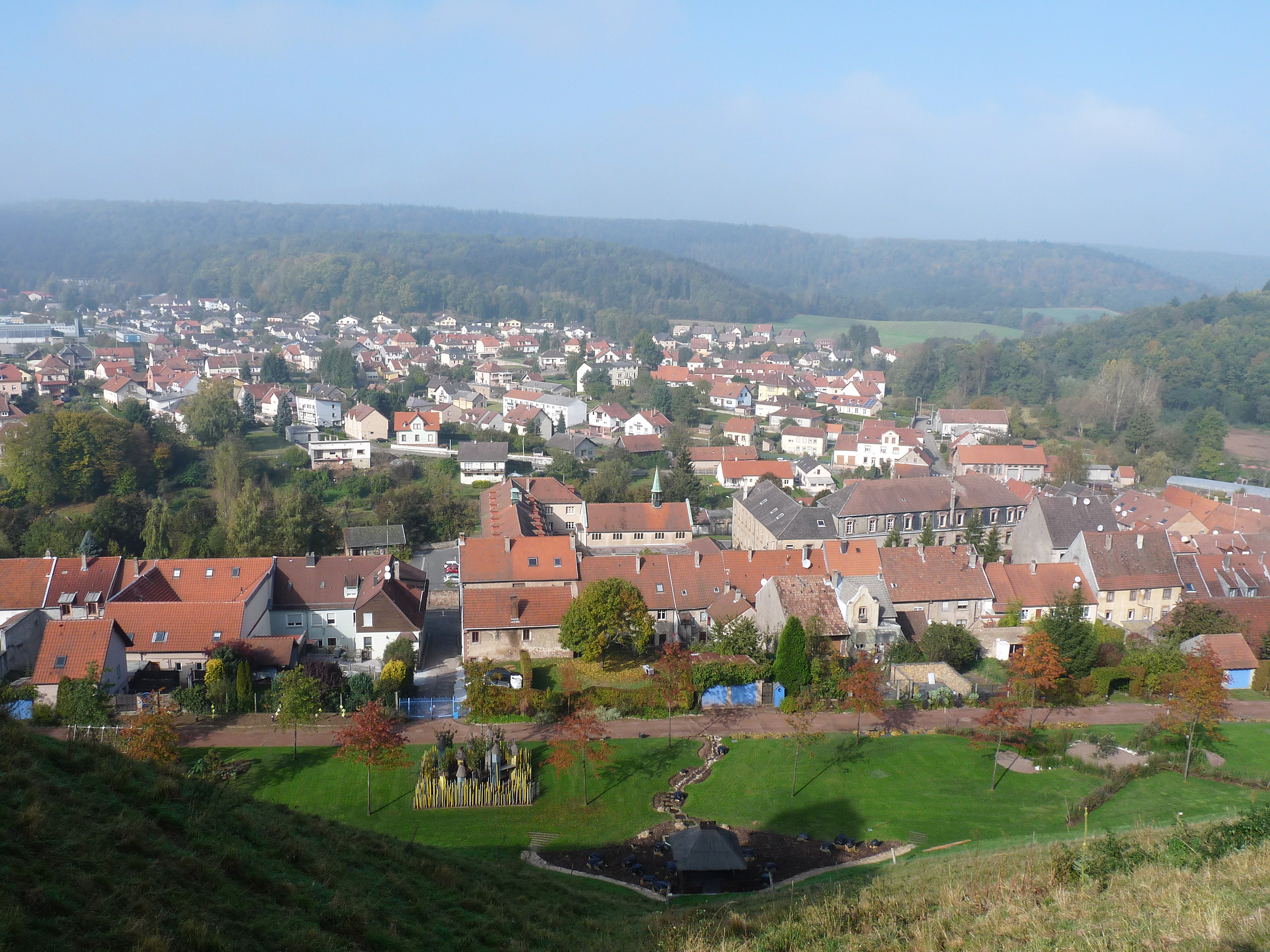
Bitche view from the citadel

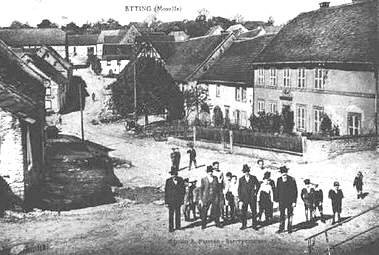
Etting at the beginning of the 20th century

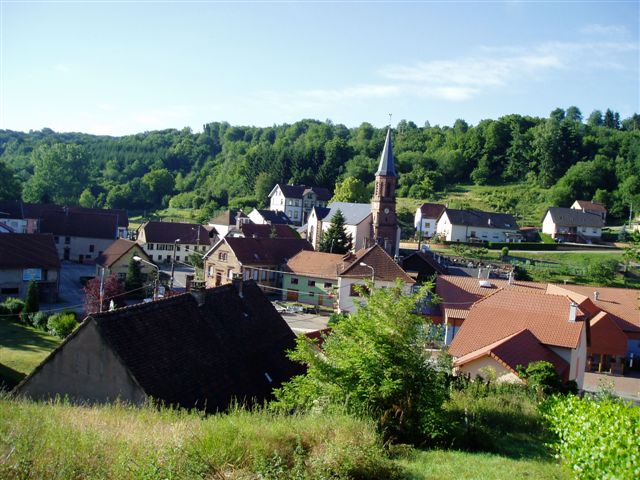
Hottviller

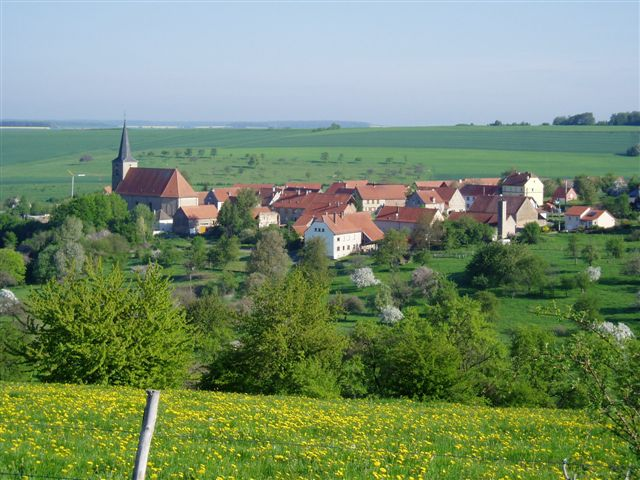
Loutzviller

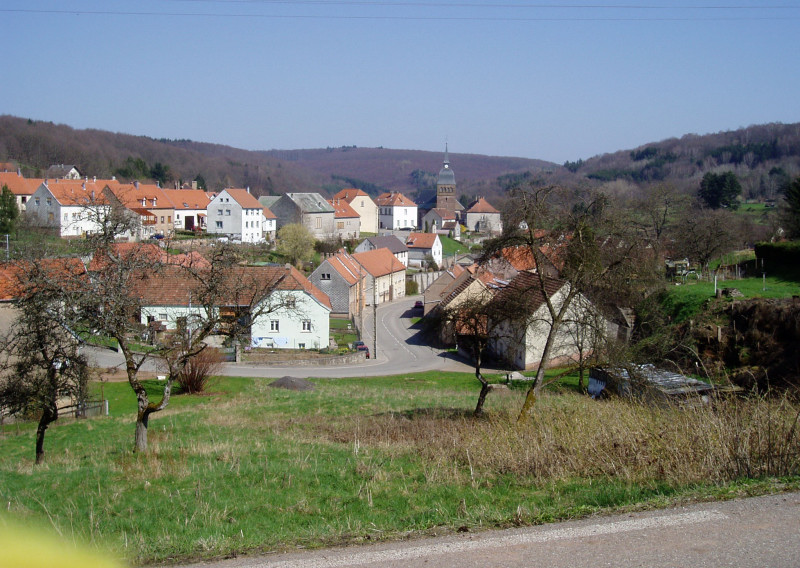
Schorbach

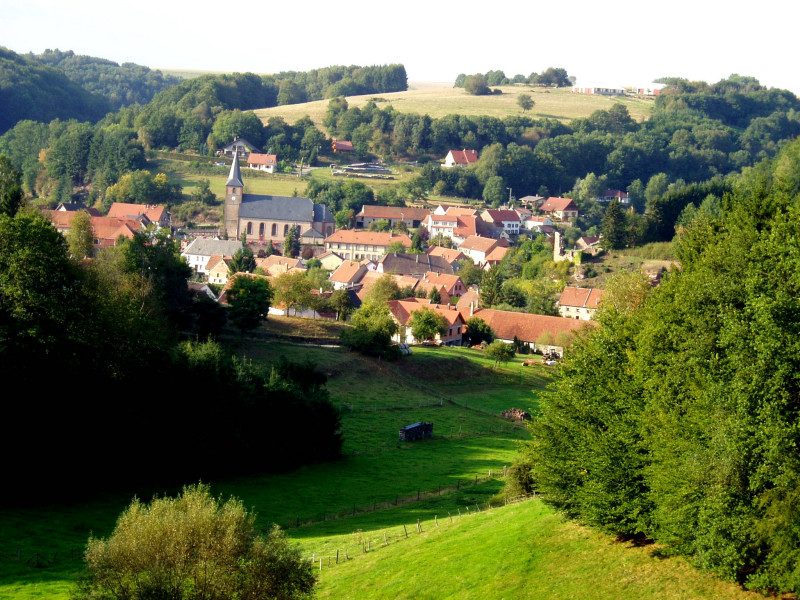
Walschbronn

Communes of the Pays de Bitche
French	Lorraine Franconian	German
Achen	Ache	Achen
Baerenthal	Bäredal	Bärenthal
Bettviller	Bettwiller	Bettweiler
Bining	Bininge	Biningen
Bitche	Bitsch	Bitsch
Bousseviller	Busswiller	Busweiler
Breidenbach	Breidebach or Breirebach	Breidenbach
Éguelshardt	Egelshad or Egelshat	Egelshardt
Enchenberg	Enschebärsch	Enchenberg
Epping	Eppinge	Eppingen
Erching	Erschinge	Erchingen
Etting	Ettinge	Ettingen
Goetzenbruck	Getzebrikk	Götzenbrück
Gros-Réderching	Grossrederschinge	Großrederchingen
Hanviller	Honnwiller	Hanweiler
Haspelschiedt	Haschbelschitt	Haspelscheidt
Hottviller	Hottwiller	Hottweiler
Kalhausen	Kalhuse	Kalhausen
Lambach	Lambach	Lambach
Lemberg	Lembärsch	Lemberg
Lengelsheim	Lengelse	Lengelsheim
Liederschiedt	Liderschid or Lirerschidt	Liederscheidt
Loutzviller	Lutzwiller	Lutzweiler
Meisenthal	Meisedal	Meisenthal
Montbronn	Mumere	Mombronn
Mouterhouse	Muterhüse or Muderhüse	Mutterhausen
Nousseviller-lès-Bitche	Nusswiller	Nussweiler
Obergailbach	Owergäälbach	Obergailbach
Ormersviller	Ormerschwiller	Ormersweiler
Petit-Réderching	Kläänrederschinge	Kleinrederchingen
Philippsbourg	Phillipsburch or Fillipsbueri	Philippsburg
Rahling	Rahlinge	Rahlingen
Reyersviller	Reierschwiller	Reyersweiler
Rimling	Rimlinge	Rimlingen
Rohrbach-lès-Bitche	Roerbach	Rohrbach
Rolbing	Rolwinge	Rolbingen
Roppeviller	Roppwiller	Roppweiler
Saint-Louis-lès-Bitche	Minzdal	Münzthal
Schmittviller	Schmittwiller	Schmittweiler
Schorbach	Schorbach	Schorbach
Schweyen	Schweije	Schweyen
Siersthal	Siirschel	Siersthal
Soucht	Sucht	Sucht
Sturzelbronn	Stirzelbrunn	Stürzelbronn
Volmunster	Wolminschter	Wolmünster
Waldhouse	Waldhuse or Walthuse	Waldhausen
Walschbronn	Walschbronn	Walschbronn
