= Communauté de communes du Pays de Bitche =

Federation of municipalities in Grand Est, France

Coordinates: 49°03′20.4″N 7°26′03.7″E

Pays de Bitche
- Communauté de communes
- Situation in the Moselle department
- Country: France
- Region: Grand Est
- Department: Moselle
- No. of communes: {{{nbcomm}}}
- Established: December 15, 2009

Government
  - President: David Suck
- Area: 602.4 km^{2} (232.6 sq mi)
- Population (2019): 33,840
  - Density: 56.18/km^{2} (145.5/sq mi)
- Website: www.cc-paysdebitche.fr

The communauté de communes du Pays de Bitche (French for "Land of Bitche community of communes", German: Gemeindeverband Bitscherland) is a federation of municipalities (communauté de communes), located in the Moselle department of the Grand Est administrative region in north-eastern France. Its seat is the town Bitche.

== History ==
The Pays de Bitche community of communes was established on December 15, 2009 by a prefectoral decree dating from December 2. It resulted from the merging of 3 of the 4 former Pays de Bitche communauté de communes : Bitche et environs, Volmunster et environs and Pays du Verre et du Cristal.

The last one of the four, the communauté de communes de Rohrbach-lès-Bitche, has merged on January 1, 2017. Since then, every commune of the Bitche canton has been part of the same intercommunality.

== Communes ==
The communauté de communes consists of the following 46 communes:

1. Achen
2. Baerenthal
3. Bettviller
4. Bining
5. Bitche
6. Bousseviller
7. Breidenbach
8. Éguelshardt
9. Enchenberg
10. Epping
11. Erching
12. Etting
13. Goetzenbruck
14. Gros-Réderching
15. Hanviller
16. Haspelschiedt
17. Hottviller
18. Lambach
19. Lemberg
20. Lengelsheim
21. Liederschiedt
22. Loutzviller
23. Meisenthal
24. Montbronn
25. Mouterhouse
26. Nousseviller-lès-Bitche
27. Obergailbach
28. Ormersviller
29. Petit-Réderching
30. Philippsbourg
31. Rahling
32. Reyersviller
33. Rimling
34. Rohrbach-lès-Bitche
35. Rolbing
36. Roppeviller
37. Saint-Louis-lès-Bitche
38. Schmittviller
39. Schorbach
40. Schweyen
41. Siersthal
42. Soucht
43. Sturzelbronn
44. Volmunster
45. Waldhouse
46. Walschbronn

== See also ==
- Communes of the Moselle department
- Canton of Bitche
- Pays de Bitche
