= Enchenberg =

- Commune
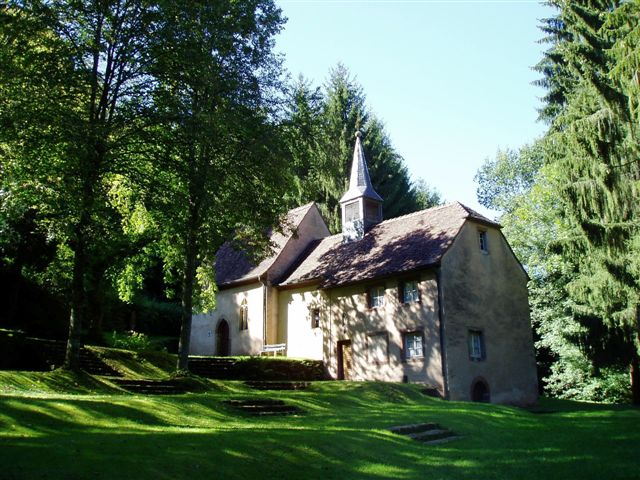
- St. Verena's Chapel

- Coat of arms
- Location of Enchenberg
- Location within France Location within Grand Est
- Coordinates: 49°01′00″N 7°20′00″E
- Country: France
- Region: Grand Est
- Department: Moselle
- Arrondissement: Sarreguemines
- Canton: Bitche
- Intercommunality: CC du Pays de Bitche

Government
  - Mayor (2020–2026): Veronique Wittmann
- Area^{1}: 9.73 km^{2} (3.76 sq mi)
- Elevation: 380 m (1,250 ft)
- Highest elevation: 408 m (1,339 ft)
- Lowest elevation: 252 m (827 ft)
- Population (2023): 1,206
  - Density: 124/km^{2} (321/sq mi)
- Time zone: UTC+01:00 (CET)
  - Summer (DST): UTC+02:00 (CEST)
- INSEE/Postal code: 57192 /57415
- Website: www.enchenberg.fr
- ^{1} French Land Register data, which excludes lakes, ponds, glaciers > 1 km^{2} (0.386 sq mi or 247 acres) and river estuaries.

Enchenberg (French pronunciation: [ɑ̃ʃɑ̃bɛʁ] or [ɛnʃənbɛʁɡ]; Lorraine Franconian: Enschebärsch) is a commune in the Moselle department of the Grand Est administrative region in north-eastern France.

The village belongs to the Pays de Bitche and to the Northern Vosges Regional Nature Park.

== Geography ==
=== Location ===
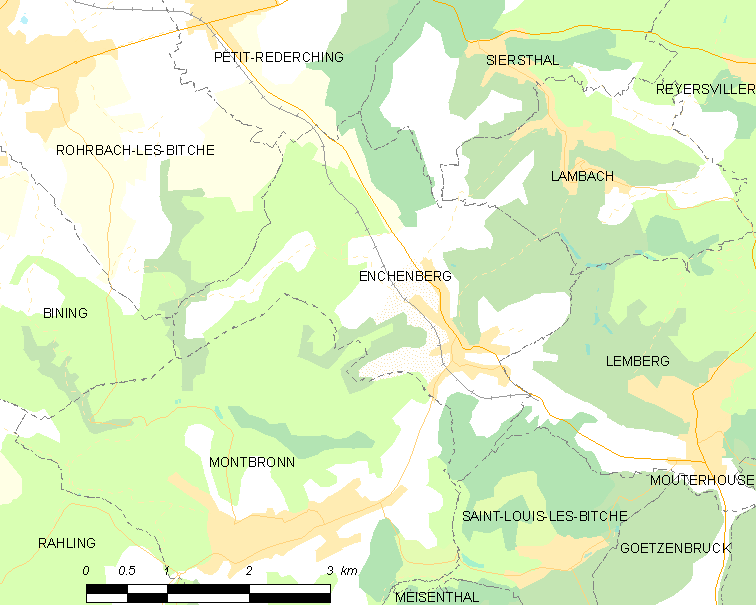
Enchenberg's municipal territory

Located east of the Moselle department, the village is part of the Pays de Bitche. It is located 8 kilometres (5.0 mi) south-west of Bitche, the county's chief town, 22.5 kilometres (14.0 mi) south-east of Sarreguemines, the arrondissement's subprefecture, about 85 kilometres (53 mi) east of Metz, the department's prefecture and about 57 kilometres (35 mi) north-west of Strasbourg, the region's prefecture. Neighboring communes include Bining and Rohrbach-lès-Bitche to the west, Petit-Réderching, Siersthal and Lambach to the north, Lemberg to the east, and Montbronn and Saint-Louis-lès-Bitche to the south.

=== Neighbouring communes and villages ===
Source:

== Administration ==
Situation of Enchenberg (red) in the Bitche canton.

=== Canton and intercommunality ===
Enchenberg is one of 46 communes in the canton of Bitche. Its general counsels since the French legislative election of 2012 are Anne Mazuy-Harter (DVD) and David Suck (UDI).

The town is part of the Pays de Bitche federation of municipalities which as of 1 January 2017 consists of the same 46 communes as the canton. This grouping is headed by Francis Vogt, municipal counsel of Bitche.

=== List of successive mayors ===
From	To	Name	Party	Position
1989	2008	Raymond Rimlinger	DVG	General counsel
2008	2011	Thierry Beck		
2011	2014	Laurent Hen		
2014	2020	Bernard Fath		
2020	2026	Veronique Wittmann		

== Population ==
The inhabitants of the commune are known as Enchenbergeois or Enchenbergeoises in French.

Historical population
Year	Pop.	±% p.a.
1968	1,277	—
1975	1,214	−0.72%
1982	1,142	−0.87%
1990	1,197	+0.59%
1999	1,192	−0.05%
2007	1,217	+0.26%
2012	1,277	+0.97%
2017	1,239	−0.60%
2023	1,206	−0.45%
Source: INSEE

== Local life ==
=== Language ===
The majority of the inhabitants can speak and/or understand German and also speak French. The local dialect is known as Lorraine Franconian. Lorraine Franconian is a dialect of German that has been spoken and developed in the region for over a thousand years.

=== Education ===
Enchenberg depends on the Academy of Nancy-Metz.

The village is provided with a preschool (French: école maternelle) and a primary school (French: école primaire).

Studies then go on at the collège La Paraison in Lemberg. To pursue their studies in high school, young Enchenbergeois mainly go to Bitche or Sarreguemines.

=== Health ===
Nearby hospitals are located in Bitche, Ingwiller, Sarreguemines, Saverne, Haguenau and Strasbourg.

== See also ==
=== Bibliography ===
- Beck, Joël (1988). Rohrbach-lès-Bitche et son canton (in French) (Éditions Pierron ed.). Sarreguemines.
- Beck, Joël (1999). Moulins : huileries, tailleries, scieries du pays de Bitche (in French) (Éditions Pierron ed.). Sarreguemines.
- Beck, Joël (2004). Le canton de Rohrbach-lès-Bitche (in French) (Éditions Sutton ed.).
- Beck, Joël (2005). Le Pays de Bitche 1900-1939 (in French) (Éditions Sutton ed.).
- Cochet, Jean Didier (2008). Plan local d'urbanisme d'Enchenberg [Rapport de présentation] (PDF) (in French). Laxou. Archived from the original (PDF) on 17 June 2016.
- Glath, Paul-Édouard (1997). Du pays de Bitche en Charente-Maritime : Souvenirs de 1939-40 (in French).
- Hiegel, Henri (1971). "Les noms de localités d'Enchenberg, Glasenberg, Lemberg et Mouterhouse". Le Pays de Bitche (in French). Vol. num. 3. pp. 8–11.
- Jacops, Marie-France; Guillaume, Jacques; Hemmert, Didier (1998). Le Pays de Bitche (Moselle) (in French) (Éditions Serpenoise ed.). Metz. pp. 46–48.
- Kochert, Francis; Michaux, Laurette; Michaux, Gérard (2008). Moselle : Metz et le pays messin, pays de Bitche, Nied, Sarrebourg, Saulnois, trois frontières et bassin houiller (in French).
- Schaefer, Joseph (2004). Le Pays de Bitche, passionnément (in French).
- Schutz, André (1992). Bitche et son pays (in French).

=== Related articles ===
- Communes of the Moselle department
- Pays de Bitche
