= Le Val-de-Guéblange =

- Commune
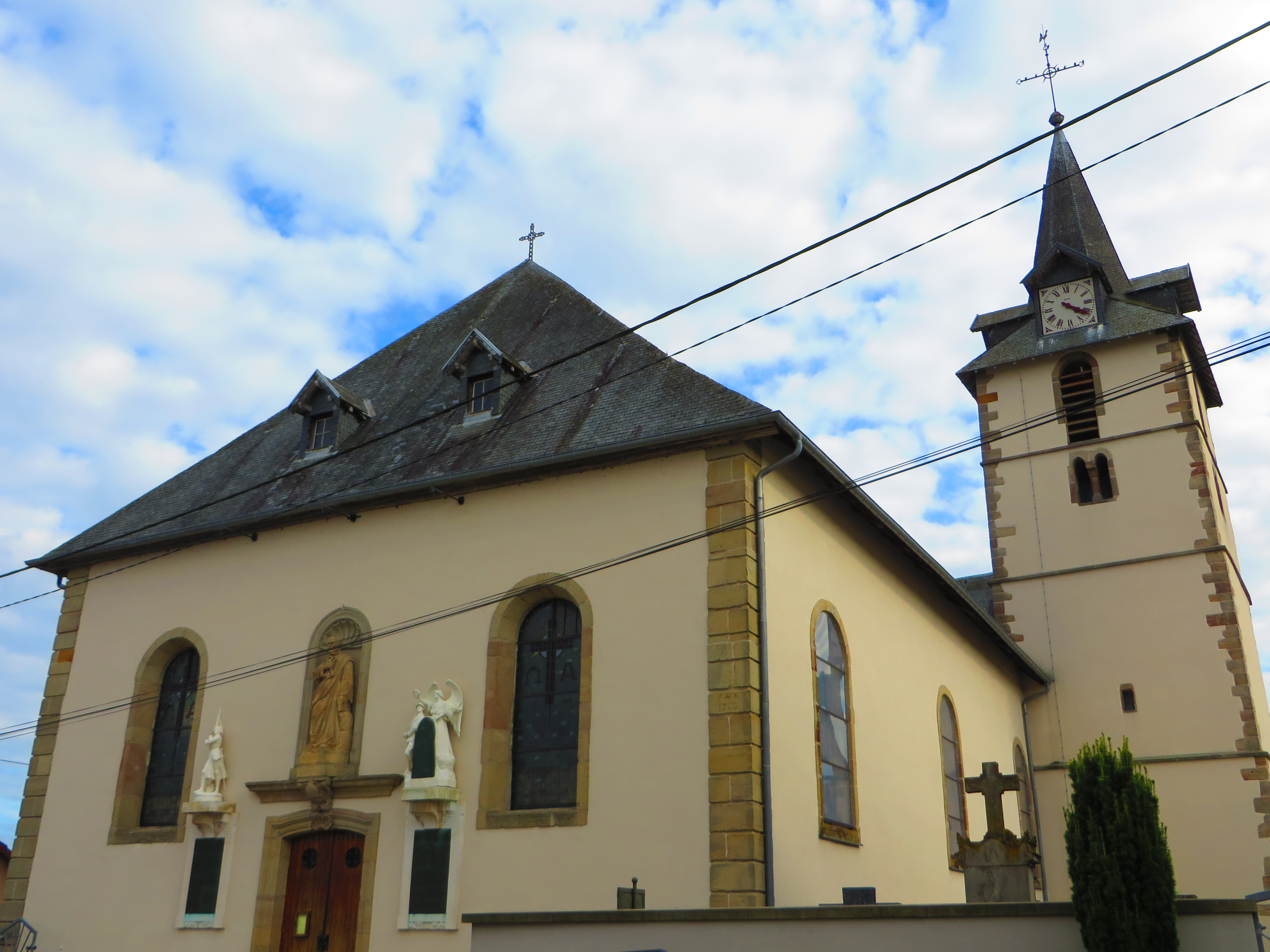
- The church in Le Val-de-Guéblange

- Coat of arms
- Location of Le Val-de-Guéblange
- Location within France Location within Grand Est
- Coordinates: 48°58′49″N 6°57′41″E
- Country: France
- Region: Grand Est
- Department: Moselle
- Arrondissement: Sarreguemines
- Canton: Sarralbe
- Intercommunality: CA Sarreguemines Confluences

Government
  - Mayor (2020–2026): Sonia Bur
- Area^{1}: 19.08 km^{2} (7.37 sq mi)
- Elevation: 187 m (614 ft)
- Highest elevation: 261 m (856 ft)
- Lowest elevation: 211 m (692 ft)
- Population (2023): 789
  - Density: 41.4/km^{2} (107/sq mi)
- Time zone: UTC+01:00 (CET)
  - Summer (DST): UTC+02:00 (CEST)
- INSEE/Postal code: 57267 /57430
- ^{1} French Land Register data, which excludes lakes, ponds, glaciers > 1 km^{2} (0.386 sq mi or 247 acres) and river estuaries.

Le Val-de-Guéblange (French pronunciation: [lə val də ɡeblɑ̃ʒ]; German: Geblingen; Lorraine Franconian Gewlingedal) is a commune in the Moselle department in Grand Est in north-eastern France.

Localities of the commune: Audviller, Schweix, Steinbach, Wentzviller.

== Population ==
Historical population
Year	Pop.	±% p.a.
1968	977	—
1975	916	−0.92%
1982	882	−0.54%
1990	888	+0.08%
1999	904	+0.20%
2007	876	−0.39%
2012	869	−0.16%
2017	856	−0.30%
2023	789	−1.35%
Source: INSEE

== Sites and Monuments ==
- Passage of a Roman road.
- Formerly a castle dominated the valley ( the present church of the valley was built on the location). The squires to fill the moats, had the bad idea to divert Alba. So many frogs settled around the castle and prevented them from sleeping . To not be disturbed in their sleep by these frogs, people did the extermination of the castle... The villagers had to get up at night and suddenly shovels, killed all the frogs . Since frogs found in the emblem of the valley of Guéblange .

== Clubs ==
- Dance club of the foyer Jolival

== See also ==
- Communes of the Moselle department
