= Olsberg =

Olsberg may refer to:

- Olsberg, Germany, a town in Sauerland, North Rhine-Westphalia, Germany
- Olsberg, Switzerland, a municipality in Rheinfelden district in Aargau, Switzerland
- Olsberg, Basel-Landschaft, a former municipality in Basel-Landschaft, Switzerland
- Olsberg, France, a village, part of the commune of Breidenbach, Moselle
