= Ormersviller =

- Commune
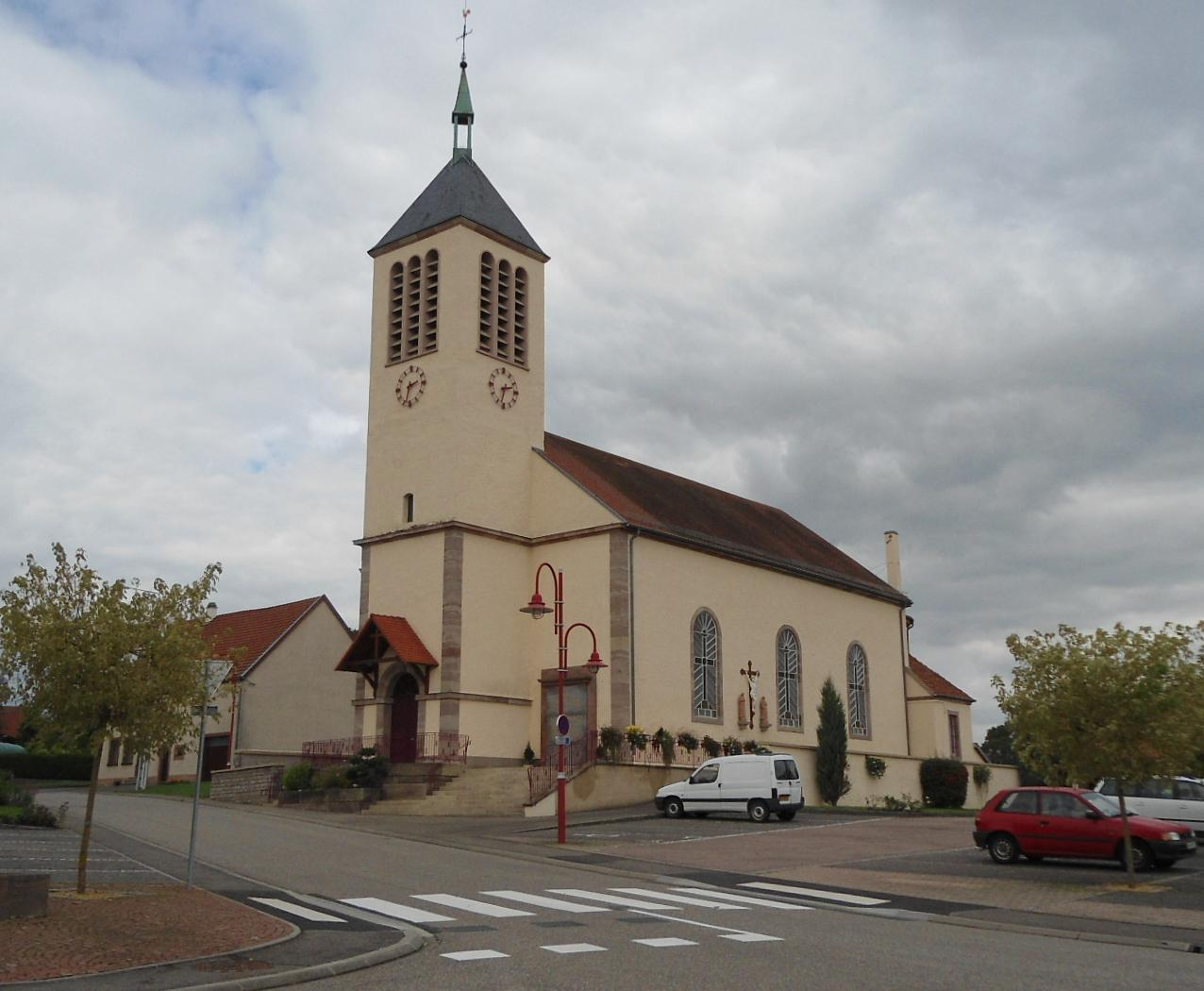
- The church in Ormersviller

- Coat of arms
- Location of Ormersviller
- Location within France Location within Grand Est
- Coordinates: 49°08′05″N 7°19′33″E
- Country: France
- Region: Grand Est
- Department: Moselle
- Arrondissement: Sarreguemines
- Canton: Bitche
- Intercommunality: CC du Pays de Bitche

Government
  - Mayor (2020–2026): Marcel Vogel
- Area^{1}: 7.3 km^{2} (2.8 sq mi)
- Elevation: 312 m (1,024 ft)
- Highest elevation: 376 m (1,234 ft)
- Lowest elevation: 242 m (794 ft)
- Population (2023): 385
  - Density: 53/km^{2} (140/sq mi)
- Time zone: UTC+01:00 (CET)
  - Summer (DST): UTC+02:00 (CEST)
- INSEE/Postal code: 57526 /57720
- ^{1} French Land Register data, which excludes lakes, ponds, glaciers > 1 km^{2} (0.386 sq mi or 247 acres) and river estuaries.

Ormersviller (French pronunciation: [ɔʁmɛʁsvilɛʁ]; German: Ormersweiler; Lorraine Franconian: Ormerschwiller) is a commune in the Moselle department of the Grand Est administrative region in north-eastern France.

The village belongs to the Pays de Bitche and to the Northern Vosges Regional Nature Park.

== See also ==
- Communes of the Moselle department
