= Bousseviller =

- Commune
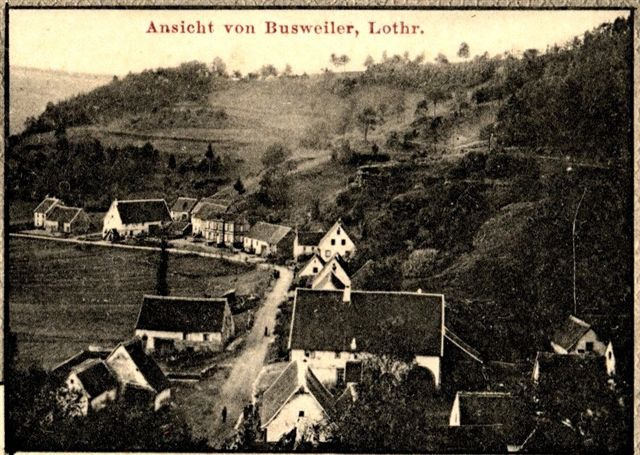
- A postcard view of Bousseviller in 1912

- Coat of arms
- Location of Bousseviller
- Location within France Location within Grand Est
- Coordinates: 49°07′18″N 7°27′54″E
- Country: France
- Region: Grand Est
- Department: Moselle
- Arrondissement: Sarreguemines
- Canton: Bitche
- Intercommunality: CC du Pays de Bitche

Government
  - Mayor (2022–2026): Manuel Leoncini
- Area^{1}: 4.01 km^{2} (1.55 sq mi)
- Elevation: 150 m (490 ft)
- Highest elevation: 384 m (1,260 ft)
- Lowest elevation: 257 m (843 ft)
- Population (2023): 114
  - Density: 28.4/km^{2} (73.6/sq mi)
- Time zone: UTC+01:00 (CET)
  - Summer (DST): UTC+02:00 (CEST)
- INSEE/Postal code: 57103 /57230
- ^{1} French Land Register data, which excludes lakes, ponds, glaciers > 1 km^{2} (0.386 sq mi or 247 acres) and river estuaries.

Bousseviller (French pronunciation: [busvilɛʁ]; German: Busweiler; Lorraine Franconian: Busswiller) is a commune in the Moselle department of the Grand Est administrative region in north-eastern France.

The village belongs to the Pays de Bitche and to the Northern Vosges Regional Nature Park.

== Population ==
Historical population
Year	Pop.	±% p.a.
1968	166	—
1975	178	+1.00%
1982	154	−2.05%
1990	145	−0.75%
1999	150	+0.38%
2007	134	−1.40%
2012	140	+0.88%
2017	125	−2.24%
2023	114	−1.52%
Source: INSEE

== See also ==
- Communes of the Moselle department
