= Rolbing =

- Commune
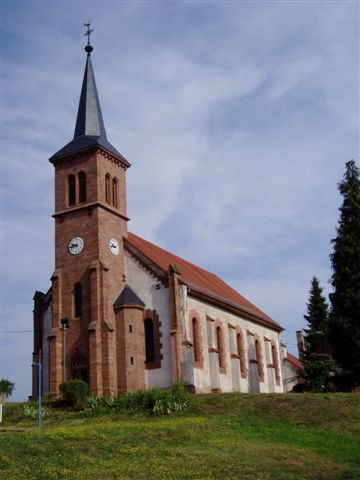
- The church in Rolbing

- Coat of arms
- Location of Rolbing
- Location within France Location within Grand Est
- Coordinates: 49°10′21″N 7°26′25″E
- Country: France
- Region: Grand Est
- Department: Moselle
- Arrondissement: Sarreguemines
- Canton: Bitche
- Intercommunality: CC du Pays de Bitche

Government
  - Mayor (2020–2026): Gaston Leichtnam
- Area^{1}: 5.97 km^{2} (2.31 sq mi)
- Elevation: 300 m (980 ft)
- Highest elevation: 348 m (1,142 ft)
- Lowest elevation: 247 m (810 ft)
- Population (2023): 259
  - Density: 43.4/km^{2} (112/sq mi)
- Time zone: UTC+01:00 (CET)
  - Summer (DST): UTC+02:00 (CEST)
- INSEE/Postal code: 57590 /57720
- ^{1} French Land Register data, which excludes lakes, ponds, glaciers > 1 km^{2} (0.386 sq mi or 247 acres) and river estuaries.

Rolbing (French pronunciation: [ʁɔlbɛ̃]; German: Rolbingen; Lorraine Franconian: Rolwinge) is a commune in the Moselle department of the Grand Est administrative region in north-eastern France.

The village belongs to the Pays de Bitche and to the Northern Vosges Regional Nature Park.

== See also ==
- Communes of the Moselle department
