= Waldhouse =

- Commune
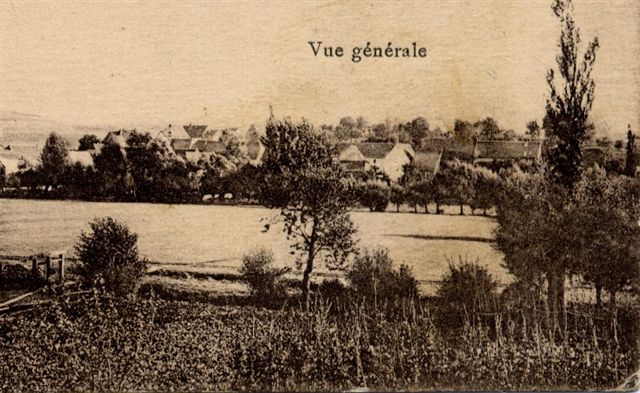
- A view of the village before 1939

- Coat of arms
- Location of Waldhouse
- Location within France Location within Grand Est
- Coordinates: 49°08′41″N 7°28′03″E
- Country: France
- Region: Grand Est
- Department: Moselle
- Arrondissement: Sarreguemines
- Canton: Bitche
- Intercommunality: Pays de Bitche

Government
  - Mayor (2020–2026): Emile Oliger
- Area^{1}: 6.58 km^{2} (2.54 sq mi)
- Elevation: 384 m (1,260 ft)
- Highest elevation: 381 m (1,250 ft)
- Lowest elevation: 248 m (814 ft)
- Population (2023): 347
  - Density: 52.7/km^{2} (137/sq mi)
- Time zone: UTC+01:00 (CET)
  - Summer (DST): UTC+02:00 (CEST)
- INSEE/Postal code: 57738 /57720
- ^{1} French Land Register data, which excludes lakes, ponds, glaciers > 1 km^{2} (0.386 sq mi or 247 acres) and river estuaries.

Waldhouse (French pronunciation: [valduz]; German: Waldhausen; Lorraine Franconian: Walthuse) is a commune in the Moselle department of the Grand Est administrative region in north-eastern France.

The village belongs to the Pays de Bitche and to the Northern Vosges Regional Nature Park.

== Population ==
Historical population
| Year | Pop. | ±% p.a. |
|---|---|---|
| 1968 | 362 | — |
| 1975 | 352 | −0.40% |
| 1982 | 310 | −1.80% |
| 1990 | 344 | +1.31% |
| 1999 | 382 | +1.17% |
| 2007 | 386 | +0.13% |
| 2012 | 390 | +0.21% |
| 2017 | 401 | +0.56% |
| 2023 | 347 | −2.38% |
Source: INSEE

== See also ==
- Communes of the Moselle department
