= Nousseviller-lès-Bitche =

- Commune
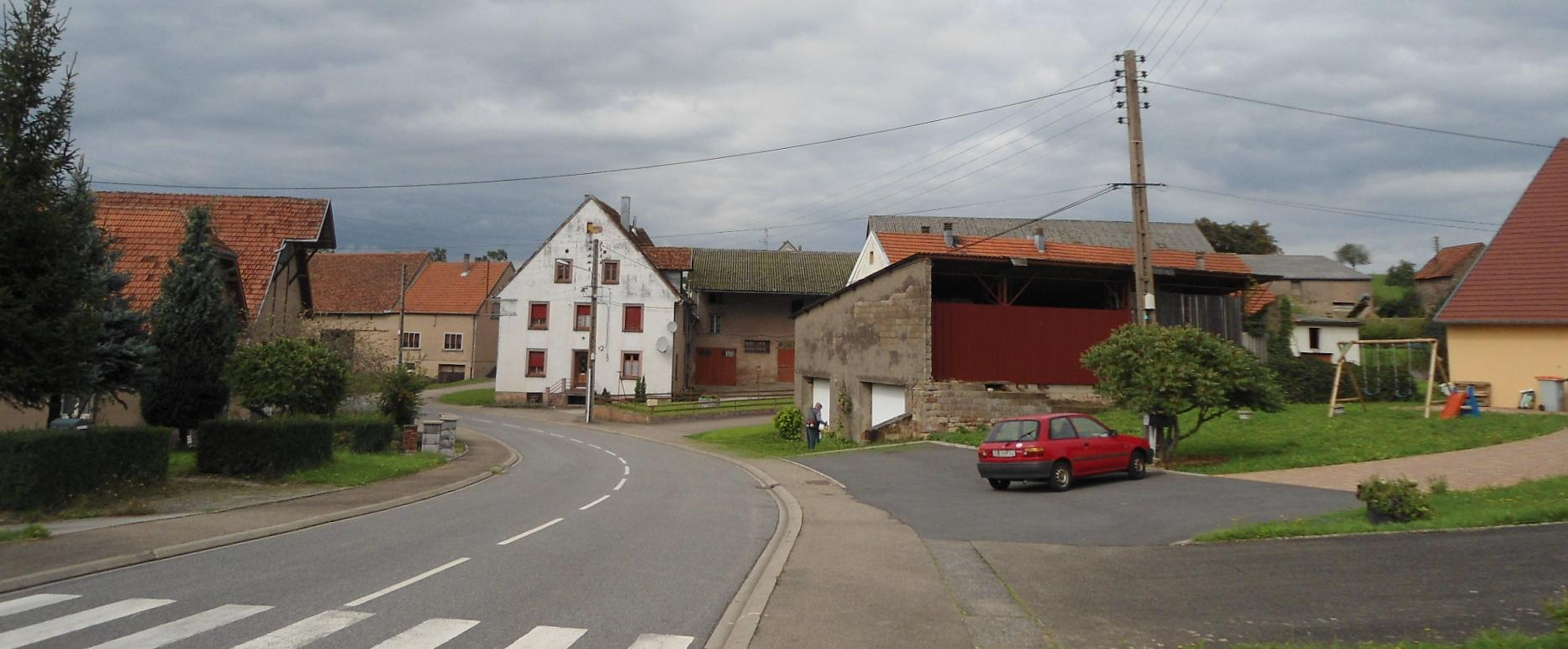
- The centre of Nousseviller-lès-Bitche

- Coat of arms
- Location of Nousseviller-lès-Bitche
- Location within France Location within Grand Est
- Coordinates: 49°06′14″N 7°22′30″E
- Country: France
- Region: Grand Est
- Department: Moselle
- Arrondissement: Sarreguemines
- Canton: Bitche
- Intercommunality: CC du Pays de Bitche

Government
  - Mayor (2020–2026): Jacqueline Glad
- Area^{1}: 4.86 km^{2} (1.88 sq mi)
- Elevation: 345 m (1,132 ft)
- Highest elevation: 374 m (1,227 ft)
- Lowest elevation: 265 m (869 ft)
- Population (2023): 150
  - Density: 31/km^{2} (80/sq mi)
- Time zone: UTC+01:00 (CET)
  - Summer (DST): UTC+02:00 (CEST)
- INSEE/Postal code: 57513 /57720
- ^{1} French Land Register data, which excludes lakes, ponds, glaciers > 1 km^{2} (0.386 sq mi or 247 acres) and river estuaries.

Nousseviller-lès-Bitche (French pronunciation: [nusvilɛʁ lɛ bitʃ], literally Nousseviller near Bitche; German: Nussweiler bei Bitsch; Lorraine Franconian: Nusswiller) is a commune in the Moselle department of the Grand Est administrative region in north-eastern France.

The village belongs to the Pays de Bitche and to the Northern Vosges Regional Nature Park.

== See also ==
- Communes of the Moselle department
