= Meisenthal =

- Commune
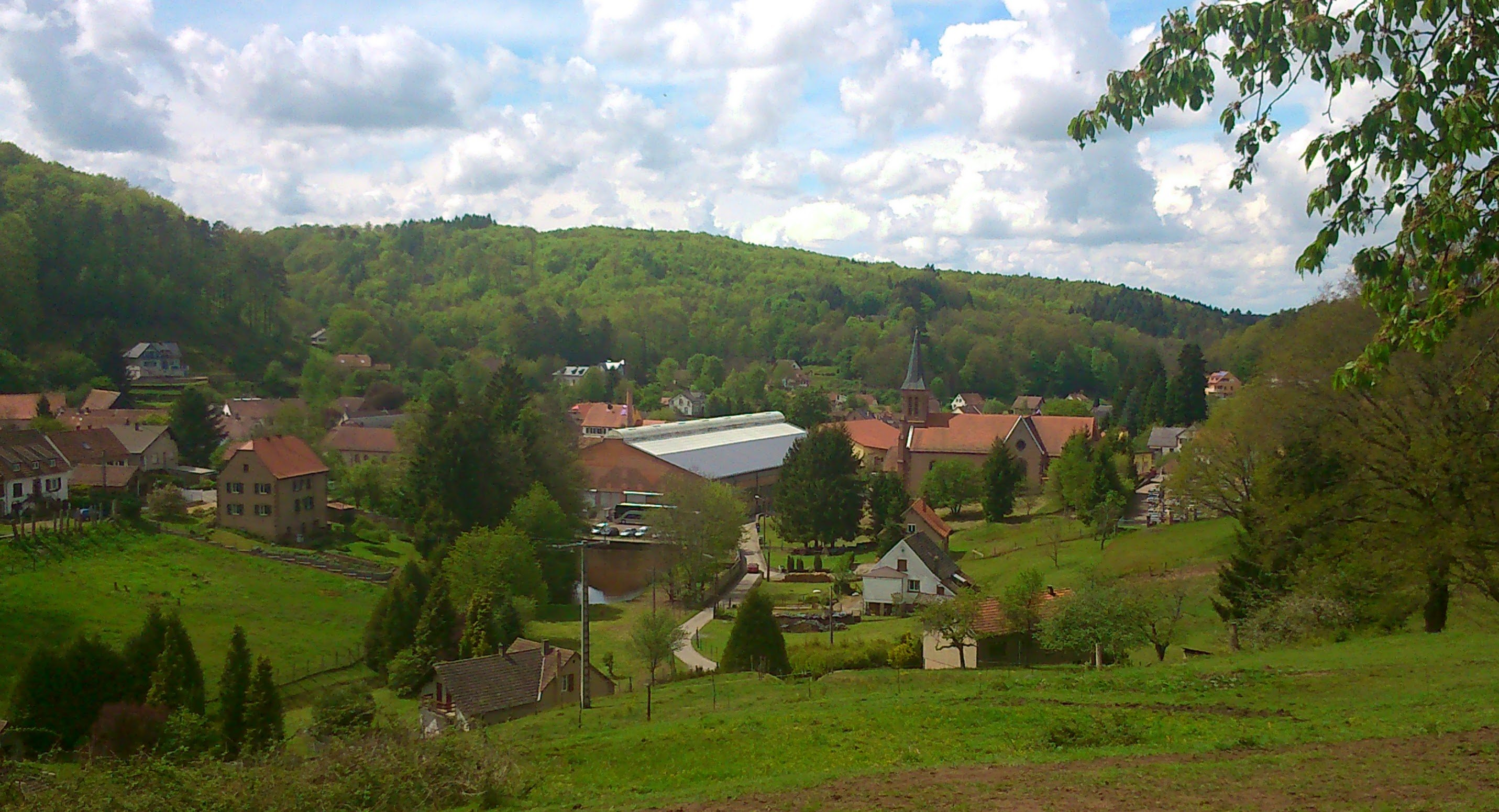
- A general view of Meisenthal

- Coat of arms
- Location of Meisenthal
- Location within France Location within Grand Est
- Coordinates: 48°57′59″N 7°21′11″E
- Country: France
- Region: Grand Est
- Department: Moselle
- Arrondissement: Sarreguemines
- Canton: Bitche
- Intercommunality: CC du Pays de Bitche

Government
  - Mayor (2022–2026): Jénifer Freund
- Area^{1}: 6.36 km^{2} (2.46 sq mi)
- Elevation: 350 m (1,150 ft)
- Highest elevation: 431 m (1,414 ft)
- Lowest elevation: 255 m (837 ft)
- Population (2023): 635
  - Density: 99.8/km^{2} (259/sq mi)
- Time zone: UTC+01:00 (CET)
  - Summer (DST): UTC+02:00 (CEST)
- INSEE/Postal code: 57456 /57960
- ^{1} French Land Register data, which excludes lakes, ponds, glaciers > 1 km^{2} (0.386 sq mi or 247 acres) and river estuaries.

Meisenthal (French pronunciation: [maizəntal]; Lorraine Franconian: Meisedal) is a commune in the Moselle department of the Grand Est administrative region in north-eastern France.

The village belongs to the Pays de Bitche and to the Northern Vosges Regional Nature Park. As of 2020, the village's population is 662. The inhabitants of the commune are known as Val-Mésangeois and Val-Mésangeoises.

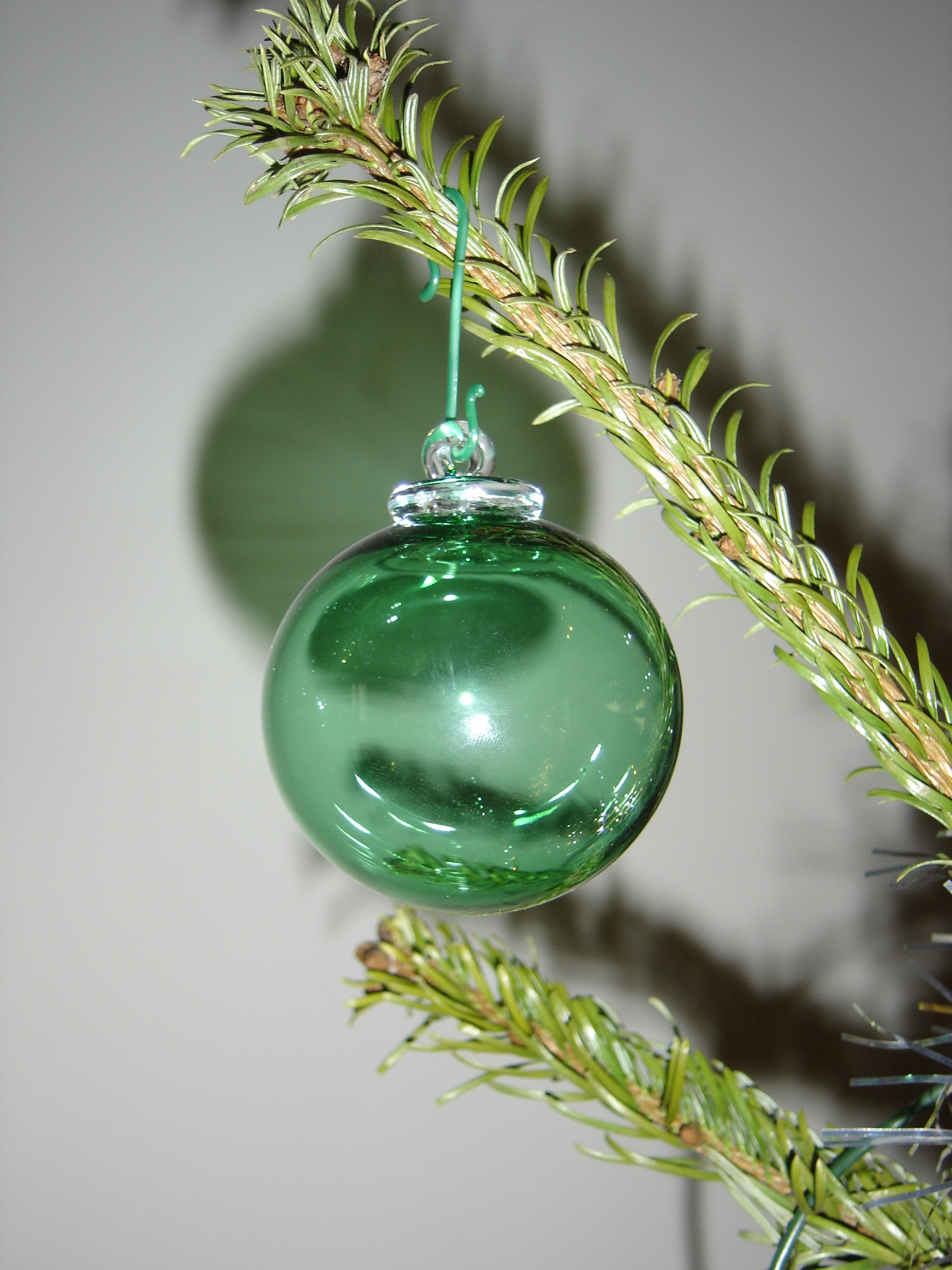
Meisenthal hand-blown Christmas decoration

The village is famous for the Centre International d'Art Verrier (CIAV; international center for studio glass). Glass has been produced in Meisenthal since the early 18th century, and since the 19th century Christmas decorations from Meisenthal were famous. It has been suggested that in the mid 19th century a shortage of apples inspired the local glass blowers to produce baubles to be used as decorations for Christmas trees instead.

== See also ==
- Émile Gallé
- Communes of the Moselle department
