= Volksberg =

- Commune
- Coat of arms
- Location of Volksberg
- Location within France Location within Grand Est
- Coordinates: 48°56′52″N 7°17′58″E
- Country: France
- Region: Grand Est
- Department: Bas-Rhin
- Arrondissement: Saverne
- Canton: Ingwiller
- Intercommunality: Alsace Bossue

Government
  - Mayor (2020–2026): Georges Stoebener
- Area^{1}: 9.45 km^{2} (3.65 sq mi)
- Elevation: 380 m (1,250 ft)
- Highest elevation: 408 m (1,339 ft)
- Lowest elevation: 248 m (814 ft)
- Population (2023): 353
  - Density: 37.4/km^{2} (96.7/sq mi)
- Time zone: UTC+01:00 (CET)
  - Summer (DST): UTC+02:00 (CEST)
- INSEE/Postal code: 67509 /67290
- ^{1} French Land Register data, which excludes lakes, ponds, glaciers > 1 km^{2} (0.386 sq mi or 247 acres) and river estuaries.

Volksberg is a commune in the Bas-Rhin department in Grand Est in north-eastern France.

The village is part of the Northern Vosges Regional Nature Park.

== See also ==
- Communes of the Bas-Rhin department
