= Bining =

- Commune
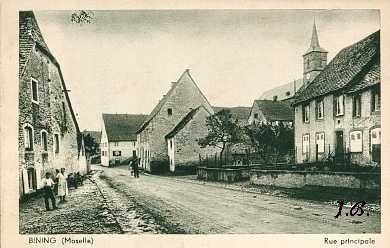
- An early 20th century postcard view of Bining

- Coat of arms
- Location of Bining
- Location within France Location within Grand Est
- Coordinates: 49°02′18″N 7°15′10″E
- Country: France
- Region: Grand Est
- Department: Moselle
- Arrondissement: Sarreguemines
- Canton: Bitche
- Intercommunality: CC du Pays de Bitche

Government
  - Mayor (2020–2026): Monique Ruff
- Area^{1}: 15.91 km^{2} (6.14 sq mi)
- Elevation: 350 m (1,150 ft)
- Highest elevation: 379 m (1,243 ft)
- Lowest elevation: 248 m (814 ft)
- Population (2023): 1,162
  - Density: 73.04/km^{2} (189.2/sq mi)
- Time zone: UTC+01:00 (CET)
  - Summer (DST): UTC+02:00 (CEST)
- INSEE/Postal code: 57083 /57410
- ^{1} French Land Register data, which excludes lakes, ponds, glaciers > 1 km^{2} (0.386 sq mi or 247 acres) and river estuaries.

Bining (French pronunciation: [binɛ̃]; German: Biningen; Lorraine Franconian: Bininge) is a commune in the Moselle department of the Grand Est administrative region in north-eastern France.

The village belongs to the Pays de Bitche.

== Geography ==
The village lies on sloping ground on the border between wooded and open areas, in the centre of the former canton of Rohrbach-lès-Bitche.

== History ==
Ten or so archaeological sites show that the area has been occupied since the Gallo-Roman period. Bining was referred to in 1351 as Biningen, after Bino, a Germanic man's name. The village formed part of the manor of Bitche, and in the mid-14th century, Gérard de Warsberg was granted fiefdom over it.

Within the Roman Catholic Church, the village was organised as a succursal parish of Rohrbach, to which an Archpriest was appointed in 1821. Bining Church, which is dedicated to the Virgin Birth, was constructed shortly afterwards, in order to replace an 18th-century chapel, although the bell-tower was only added in 1846.

The village was bombed in December 1944 and January 1945, although it still contains several ancient dwellings and numerous monumental crosses, including one at the edge of the chemin de Schmittviller that is the oldest in the Pays de Bitche, dating from 1629.

== Population ==
Historical population
Year	Pop.	±% p.a.
1968	1,129	—
1975	1,106	−0.29%
1982	1,117	+0.14%
1990	1,168	+0.56%
1999	1,155	−0.12%
2007	1,182	+0.29%
2012	1,167	−0.26%
2017	1,173	+0.10%
2023	1,162	−0.16%
Source: INSEE

== See also ==
- Communes of the Moselle department
