= Arrondissement of Sarreguemines =

Coordinates: 49°06′N 7°04′E

Sarreguemines
- Arrondissement
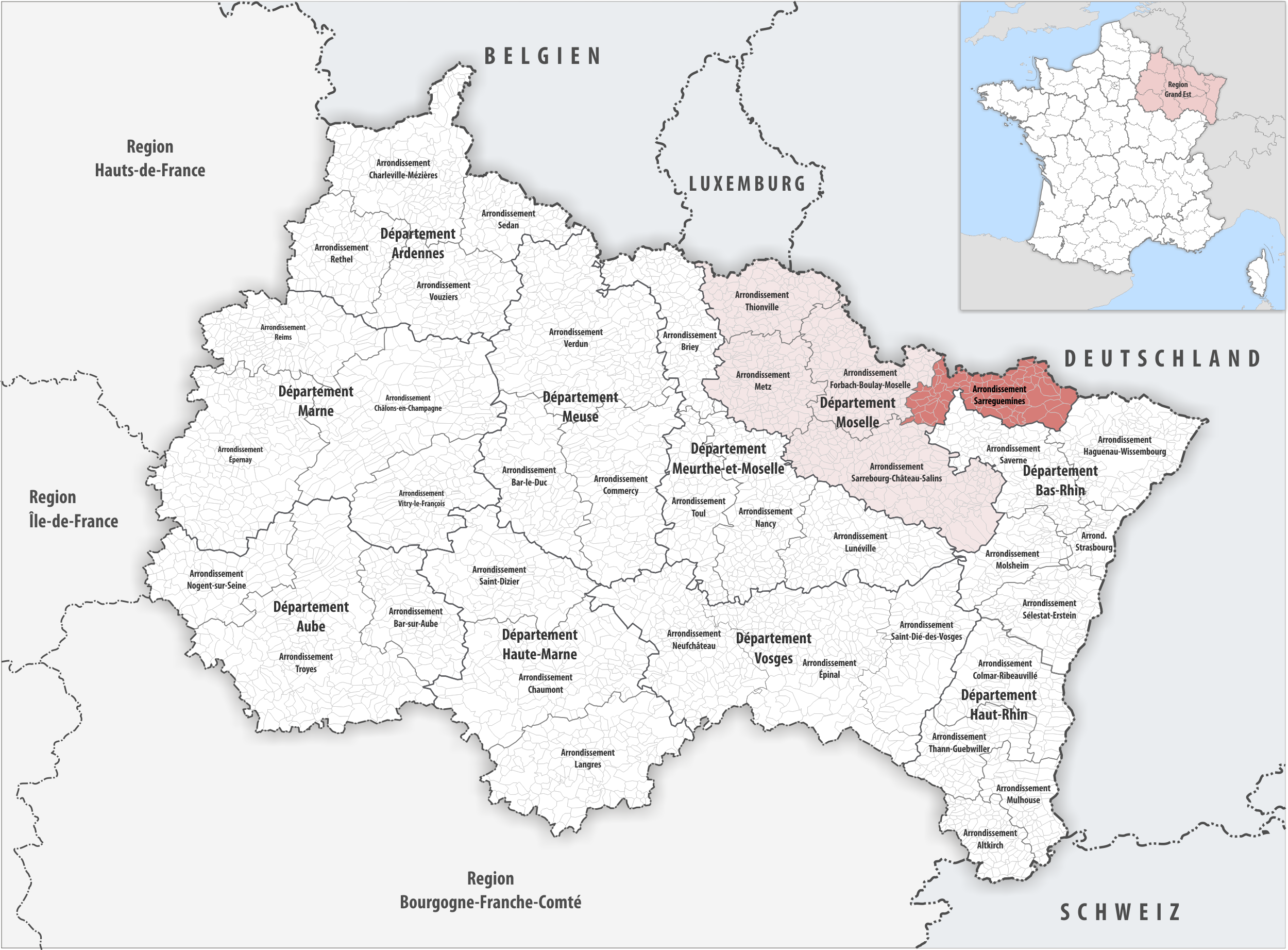
- Location within the region Grand Est
- Country: France
- Region: Grand Est
- Department: Moselle
- No. of communes: {{{nbcomm}}}
- Area: 935.9 km^{2} (361.4 sq mi)
- Population (2023): 95,402
  - Density: 101.9/km^{2} (264.0/sq mi)
- INSEE code: 576

The arrondissement of Sarreguemines is an arrondissement of France in the Moselle department in the Grand Est region. It has 83 communes. Its population is 96,273 (2021), and its area is 935.9 km^{2} (361.4 sq mi).

== Composition ==
The communes of the arrondissement of Sarreguemines, and their INSEE codes, are:

1. Achen (57006)
2. Baerenthal (57046)
3. Bettviller (57074)
4. Bining (57083)
5. Bitche (57089)
6. Bliesbruck (57091)
7. Blies-Ébersing (57092)
8. Blies-Guersviller (57093)
9. Bousseviller (57103)
10. Breidenbach (57108)
11. Éguelshardt (57188)
12. Enchenberg (57192)
13. Epping (57195)
14. Erching (57196)
15. Ernestviller (57197)
16. Etting (57201)
17. Frauenberg (57234)
18. Goetzenbruck (57250)
19. Grosbliederstroff (57260)
20. Gros-Réderching (57261)
21. Grundviller (57263)
22. Guebenhouse (57264)
23. Hambach (57289)
24. Hanviller (57294)
25. Haspelschiedt (57301)
26. Hazembourg (57308)
27. Hilsprich (57325)
28. Holving (57330)
29. Hottviller (57338)
30. Hundling (57340)
31. Ippling (57348)
32. Kalhausen (57355)
33. Kappelkinger (57357)
34. Kirviller (57366)
35. Lambach (57376)
36. Lemberg (57390)
37. Lengelsheim (57393)
38. Liederschiedt (57402)
39. Lixing-lès-Rouhling (57408)
40. Loupershouse (57419)
41. Loutzviller (57421)
42. Meisenthal (57456)
43. Montbronn (57477)
44. Mouterhouse (57489)
45. Nelling (57497)
46. Neufgrange (57499)
47. Nousseviller-lès-Bitche (57513)
48. Obergailbach (57517)
49. Ormersviller (57526)
50. Petit-Réderching (57535)
51. Philippsbourg (57541)
52. Puttelange-aux-Lacs (57556)
53. Rahling (57561)
54. Rémelfing (57568)
55. Rémering-lès-Puttelange (57571)
56. Reyersviller (57577)
57. Richeling (57581)
58. Rimling (57584)
59. Rohrbach-lès-Bitche (57589)
60. Rolbing (57590)
61. Roppeviller (57594)
62. Rouhling (57598)
63. Saint-Jean-Rohrbach (57615)
64. Saint-Louis-lès-Bitche (57619)
65. Sarralbe (57628)
66. Sarreguemines (57631)
67. Sarreinsming (57633)
68. Schmittviller (57636)
69. Schorbach (57639)
70. Schweyen (57641)
71. Siersthal (57651)
72. Soucht (57658)
73. Sturzelbronn (57661)
74. Le Val-de-Guéblange (57267)
75. Volmunster (57732)
76. Waldhouse (57738)
77. Walschbronn (57741)
78. Wiesviller (57745)
79. Willerwald (57746)
80. Wittring (57748)
81. Wœlfling-lès-Sarreguemines (57750)
82. Woustviller (57752)
83. Zetting (57760)

== History ==
The arrondissement of Sarreguemines was created in 1800, disbanded in 1871 (ceded to Germany) and restored in 1919. In January 2000 it absorbed the canton of Sarralbe from the arrondissement of Forbach.

As a result of the reorganisation of the cantons of France which came into effect in 2015, the borders of the cantons are no longer related to the borders of the arrondissements. The cantons of the arrondissement of Sarreguemines were, as of January 2015:

1. Bitche
2. Rohrbach-lès-Bitche
3. Sarralbe
4. Sarreguemines
5. Sarreguemines-Campagne
6. Volmunster
