= Epping, Moselle =

Epping
- Commune
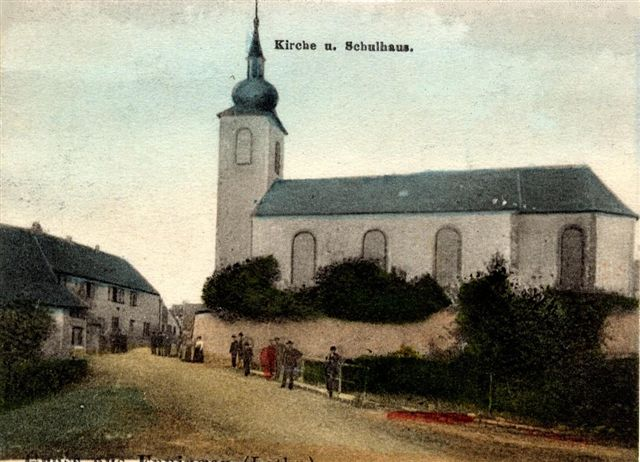
- The church and school in Epping in 1909

- Coat of arms
- Location of Epping
- Location within France Location within Grand Est
- Coordinates: 49°06′46″N 7°19′04″E
- Country: France
- Region: Grand Est
- Department: Moselle
- Arrondissement: Sarreguemines
- Canton: Bitche
- Intercommunality: CC du Pays de Bitche

Government
  - Mayor (2020–2026): Jean-Louis Chudz
- Area^{1}: 10.65 km^{2} (4.11 sq mi)
- Elevation: 280 m (920 ft)
- Highest elevation: 378 m (1,240 ft)
- Lowest elevation: 252 m (827 ft)
- Population (2023): 572
  - Density: 53.7/km^{2} (139/sq mi)
- Time zone: UTC+01:00 (CET)
  - Summer (DST): UTC+02:00 (CEST)
- INSEE/Postal code: 57195 /57720
- ^{1} French Land Register data, which excludes lakes, ponds, glaciers > 1 km^{2} (0.386 sq mi or 247 acres) and river estuaries.

Epping (French pronunciation: [epɛ̃]; German: Eppingen; Lorraine Franconian: Eppinge) is a commune in the Moselle department of the Grand Est administrative region in north-eastern France.

The village belongs to the Pays de Bitche and to the Northern Vosges Regional Nature Park.

== See also ==
- Communes of the Moselle department
