= Achen, Moselle =

Achen
- Commune
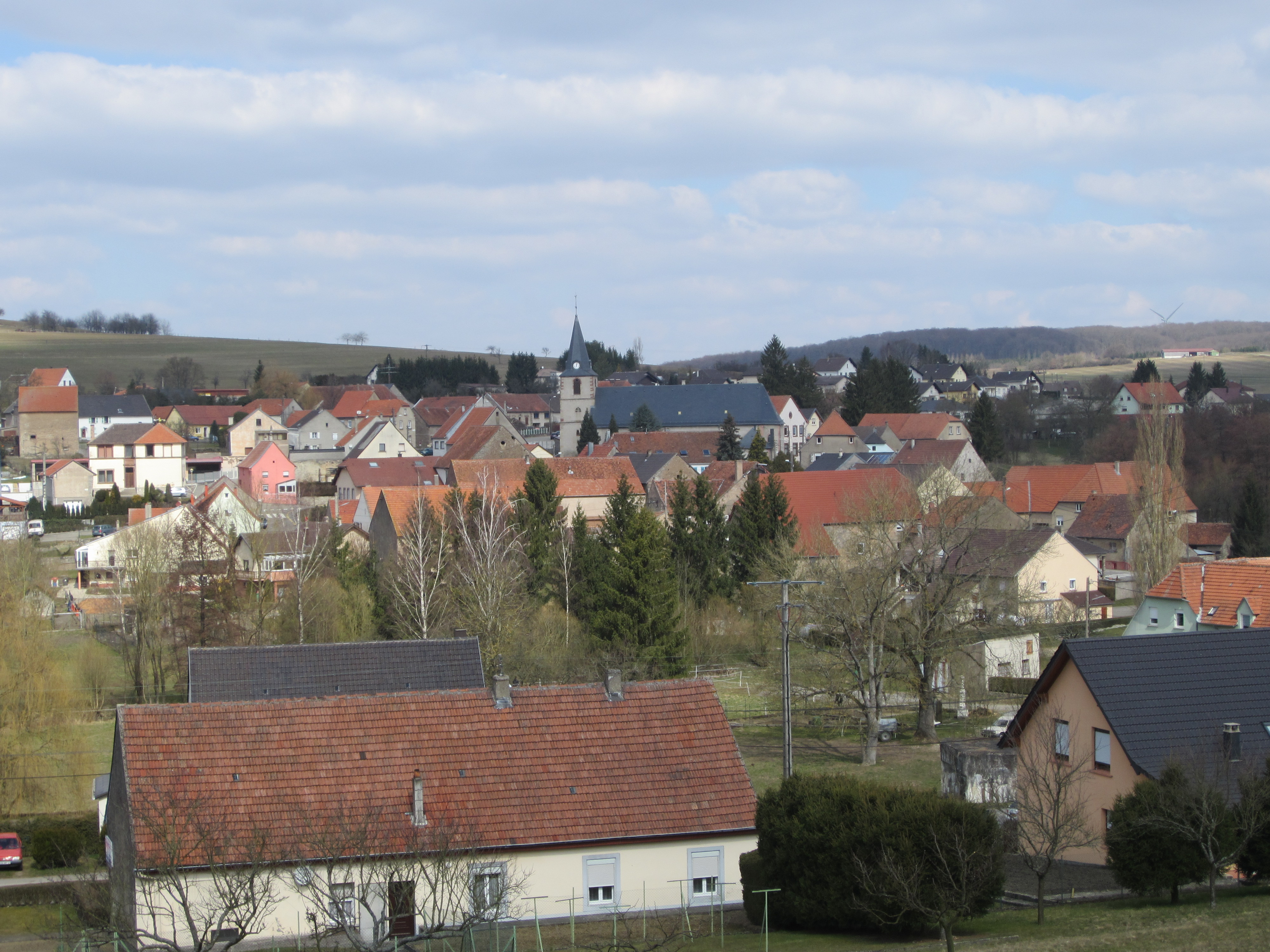
- View of Achen

- Coat of arms
- Location of Achen
- Location within France Location within Grand Est
- Coordinates: 49°02′39″N 7°11′01″E
- Country: France
- Region: Grand Est
- Department: Moselle
- Arrondissement: Sarreguemines
- Canton: Bitche
- Intercommunality: Pays de Bitche

Government
  - Mayor (2020–2026): Laurent Schrub
- Area^{1}: 12.12 km^{2} (4.68 sq mi)
- Elevation: 255 m (837 ft)
- Highest elevation: 336 m (1,102 ft)
- Lowest elevation: 225 m (738 ft)
- Population (2023): 963
  - Density: 79.5/km^{2} (206/sq mi)
- Time zone: UTC+01:00 (CET)
  - Summer (DST): UTC+02:00 (CEST)
- INSEE/Postal code: 57006 /57412
- ^{1} French Land Register data, which excludes lakes, ponds, glaciers > 1 km^{2} (0.386 sq mi or 247 acres) and river estuaries.

Achen (French pronunciation: [axən]; Lorraine Franconian: Ache, German: Achen) is a commune in the Moselle department of the Grand Est administrative region in north-eastern France. The village belongs to the Pays de Bitche.

== Population ==
Historical population
Year	Pop.	±% p.a.
1968	875	—
1975	883	+0.13%
1982	896	+0.21%
1990	929	+0.45%
1999	938	+0.11%
2007	996	+0.75%
2012	1,011	+0.30%
2017	1,011	+0.00%
2023	963	−0.81%
Source: INSEE

== See also ==
- Communes of the Moselle department
