= Erching =

- Commune
- Coat of arms
- Location of Erching
- Location within France Location within Grand Est
- Coordinates: 49°06′43″N 7°15′50″E
- Country: France
- Region: Grand Est
- Department: Moselle
- Arrondissement: Sarreguemines
- Canton: Bitche
- Intercommunality: CC du Pays de Bitche

Government
  - Mayor (2020–2026): Francis Behr
- Area^{1}: 6.76 km^{2} (2.61 sq mi)
- Elevation: 330 m (1,080 ft)
- Highest elevation: 392 m (1,286 ft)
- Lowest elevation: 268 m (879 ft)
- Population (2023): 418
  - Density: 61.8/km^{2} (160/sq mi)
- Time zone: UTC+01:00 (CET)
  - Summer (DST): UTC+02:00 (CEST)
- INSEE/Postal code: 57196 /57720
- ^{1} French Land Register data, which excludes lakes, ponds, glaciers > 1 km^{2} (0.386 sq mi or 247 acres) and river estuaries.

Erching (French pronunciation: [ɛʁʃɛ̃]; German: Erchingen; Lorraine Franconian: Erschinge) is a commune in the Moselle department of the Grand Est administrative region in north-eastern France.

The village belongs to the Pays de Bitche and to the Northern Vosges Regional Nature Park.

== See also ==
- Communes of the Moselle department
