= Schweyen =

- Commune
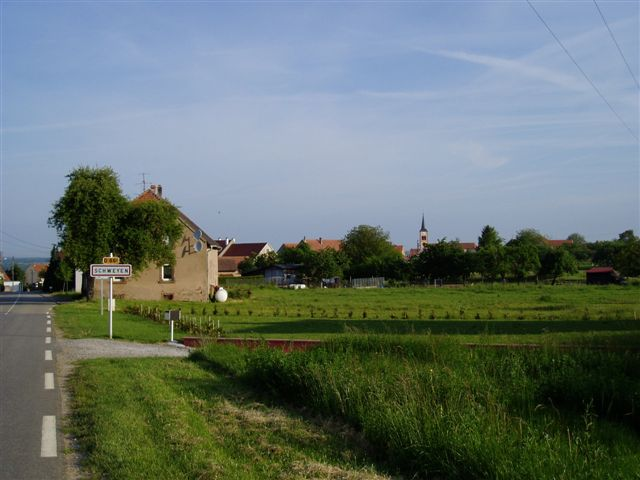
- The road into Schweyen

- Coat of arms
- Location of Schweyen
- Location within France Location within Grand Est
- Coordinates: 49°09′33″N 7°23′28″E
- Country: France
- Region: Grand Est
- Department: Moselle
- Arrondissement: Sarreguemines
- Canton: Bitche
- Intercommunality: CC du Pays de Bitche

Government
  - Mayor (2020–2026): Cathia Heim
- Area^{1}: 11.35 km^{2} (4.38 sq mi)
- Elevation: 300 m (980 ft)
- Highest elevation: 361 m (1,184 ft)
- Lowest elevation: 236 m (774 ft)
- Population (2023): 319
  - Density: 28.1/km^{2} (72.8/sq mi)
- Time zone: UTC+01:00 (CET)
  - Summer (DST): UTC+02:00 (CEST)
- INSEE/Postal code: 57641 /57720
- ^{1} French Land Register data, which excludes lakes, ponds, glaciers > 1 km^{2} (0.386 sq mi or 247 acres) and river estuaries.

Schweyen (French pronunciation: [ʃvajɛn]; Lorraine Franconian: Schweije) is a commune in the Moselle department of the Grand Est administrative region in north-eastern France.

The village belongs to the Pays de Bitche and to the Northern Vosges Regional Nature Park. It is located on the German border between the towns of Bitche, France and Zweibrücken, Germany. It has a population of 319 and an area of 1,135 hectares (2,800 acres).

It was first mentioned in 1322 under the name of "Schweien", which comes from the Old German name "Schweiga", which meant "cow" or "cattle".

Today, this village is noted for its brass band, "Amicale des Sapeurs Pompiers et Batterie Fanfare de Schweyen".

== See also ==
- Communes of the Moselle department
