= Breidenbach, Moselle =

Breidenbach
- Commune
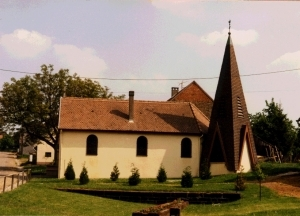
- The chapel of Olsberg

- Coat of arms
- Location of Breidenbach
- Location within France Location within Grand Est
- Coordinates: 49°08′13″N 7°25′25″E
- Country: France
- Region: Grand Est
- Department: Moselle
- Arrondissement: Sarreguemines
- Canton: Bitche
- Intercommunality: CC du Pays de Bitche

Government
  - Mayor (2020–2026): Chris Mathi
- Area^{1}: 10.89 km^{2} (4.20 sq mi)
- Elevation: 310 m (1,020 ft)
- Highest elevation: 376 m (1,234 ft)
- Lowest elevation: 252 m (827 ft)
- Population (2023): 309
  - Density: 28.4/km^{2} (73.5/sq mi)
- Time zone: UTC+01:00 (CET)
  - Summer (DST): UTC+02:00 (CEST)
- INSEE/Postal code: 57108 /57720
- ^{1} French Land Register data, which excludes lakes, ponds, glaciers > 1 km^{2} (0.386 sq mi or 247 acres) and river estuaries.

Breidenbach (French pronunciation: [bʁaidənbax]; Lorraine Franconian: Breidebach; German: Breidenbach) is a commune in the Moselle department of the Grand Est administrative region in north-eastern France.

The village belongs to the Pays de Bitche and to the Northern Vosges Regional Nature Park.

== Population ==
Historical population
Year	Pop.	±% p.a.
1968	421	—
1975	382	−1.38%
1982	376	−0.23%
1990	324	−1.84%
1999	346	+0.73%
2007	371	+0.88%
2012	348	−1.27%
2017	328	−1.18%
2023	309	−0.99%
Source: INSEE

== See also ==
- Communes of the Moselle department
