= Northern Vosges Regional Nature Park =

Regional natural park in Grand Est, France

Northern Vosges Regional Natural Park
- IUCN category V (protected landscape/seascape)
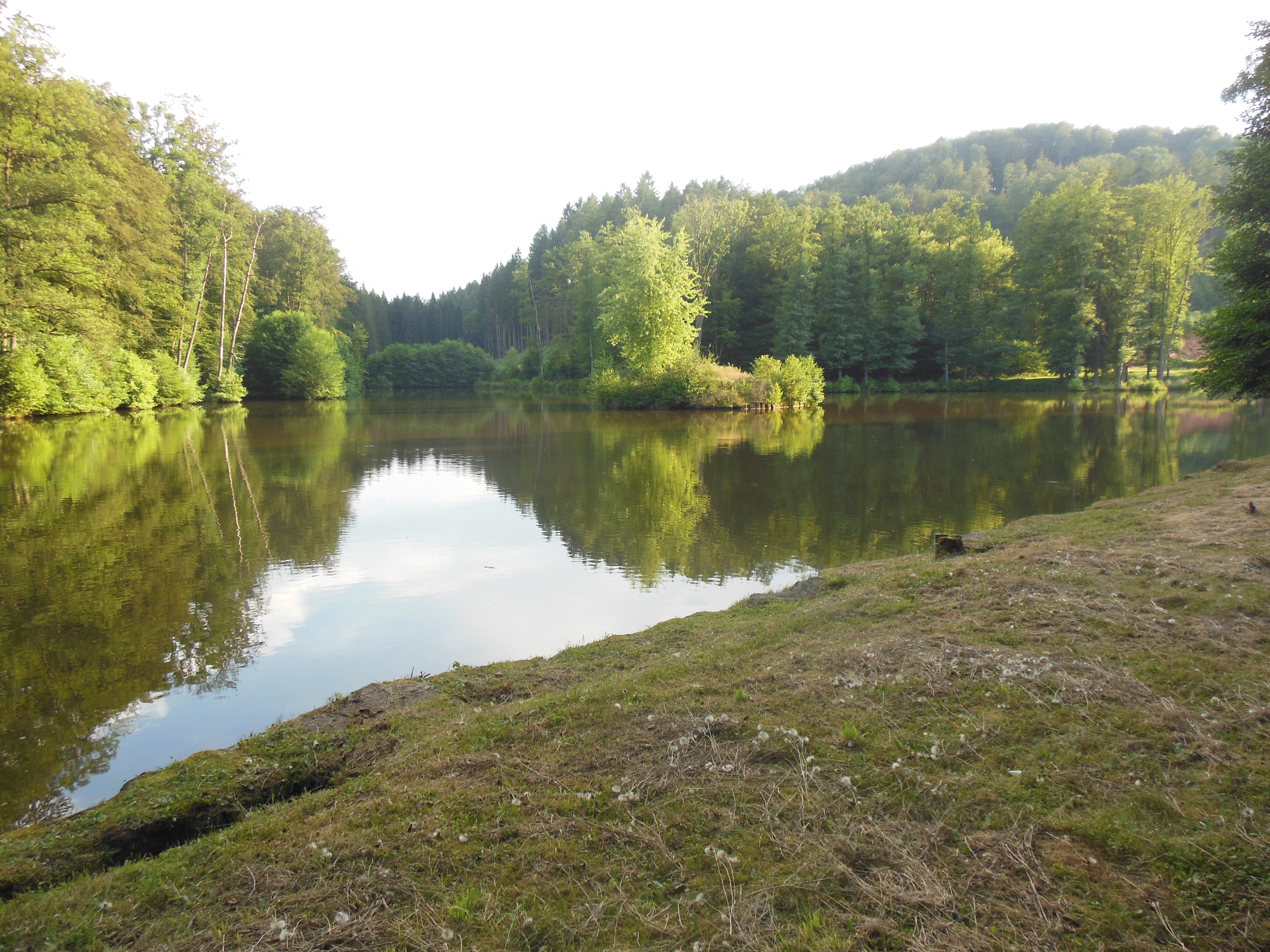
- Pond between Lambach and Lemberg
- Interactive map of Northern Vosges Regional Natural Park
- Location: Bas-Rhin (Alsace); Moselle (Lorraine), Grand Est, France
- Coordinates: 49.005°N 7.49°E
- Area: 1,305 km^{2} (504 sq mi)
- Established: 1976
- Governing body: Fédération des parcs naturels régionaux de France
- Website: www.parc-vosges-nord.fr

The Northern Vosges Regional Natural Park (French: Parc naturel régional des Vosges du Nord) is a protected area of woodland, wetland, farmland and historical sites in the Grand Est region in northeastern France. The area was officially designated as a regional natural park in 1976.

At its inauguration, the park covered 120,000 hectares (300,000 acres), but it has since grown to 130,500 hectares (322,000 acres).

The rich natural landscape has been added to the UNESCO list of international biosphere reserves.

Northern Vosges PNR does not include any of the Vosges Mountains but rather the foothills just north of them. Despite its name, no part of it lies in the department of Vosges but rather it spans two other departments, Bas-Rhin and Moselle.

== Gallery ==
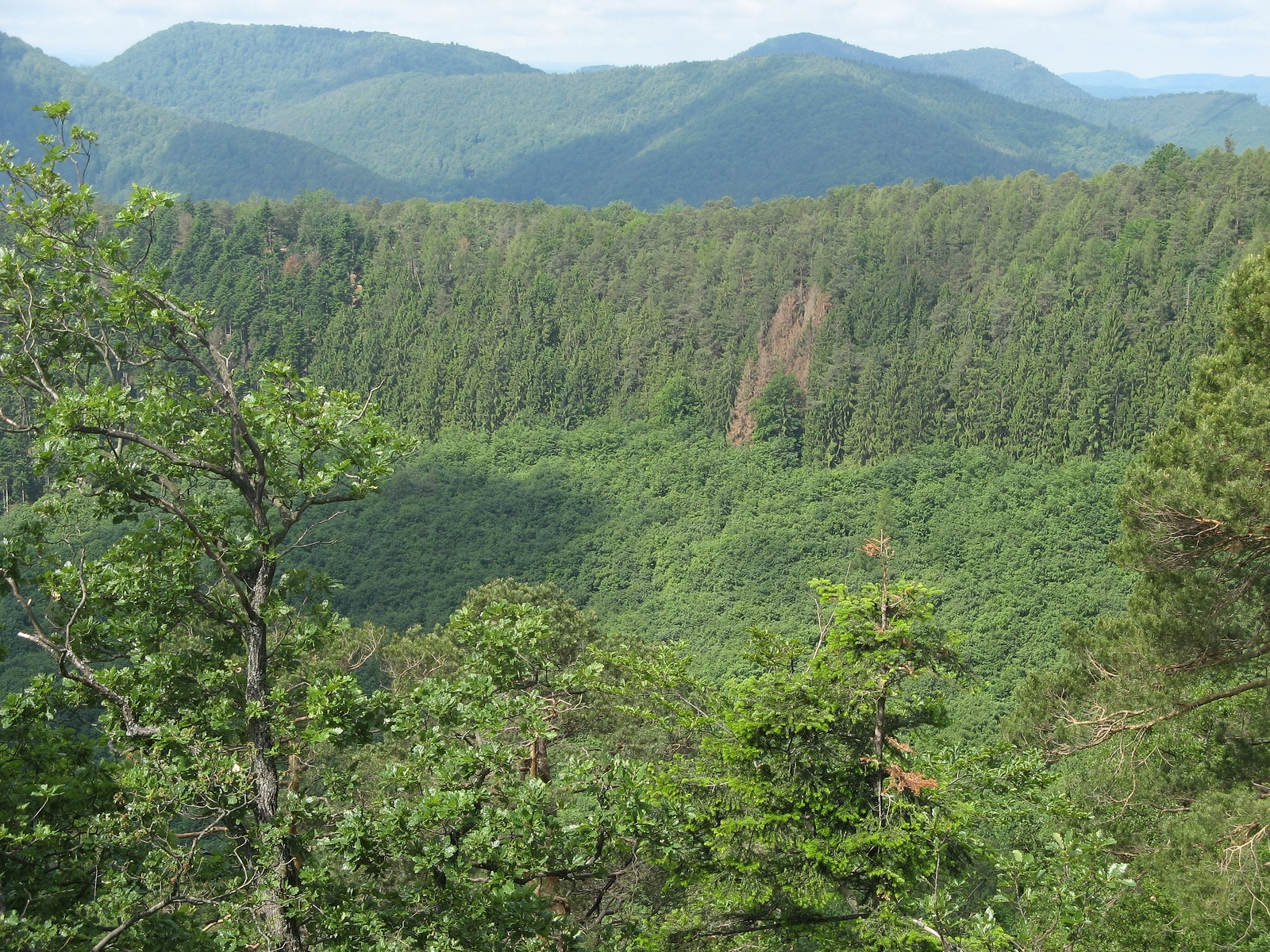
Landscape. Deciduous trees in a mix with conifer.

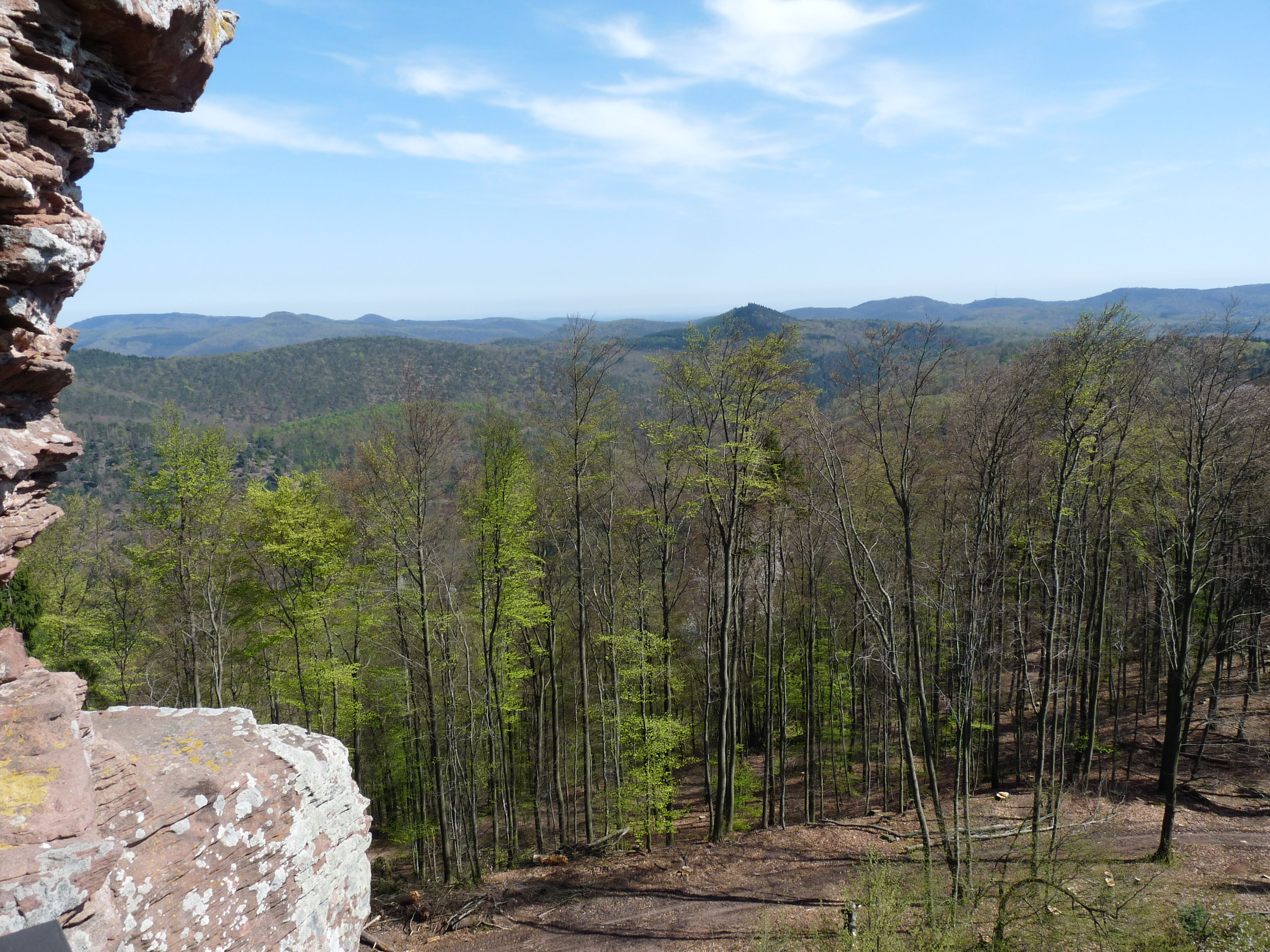
Early spring

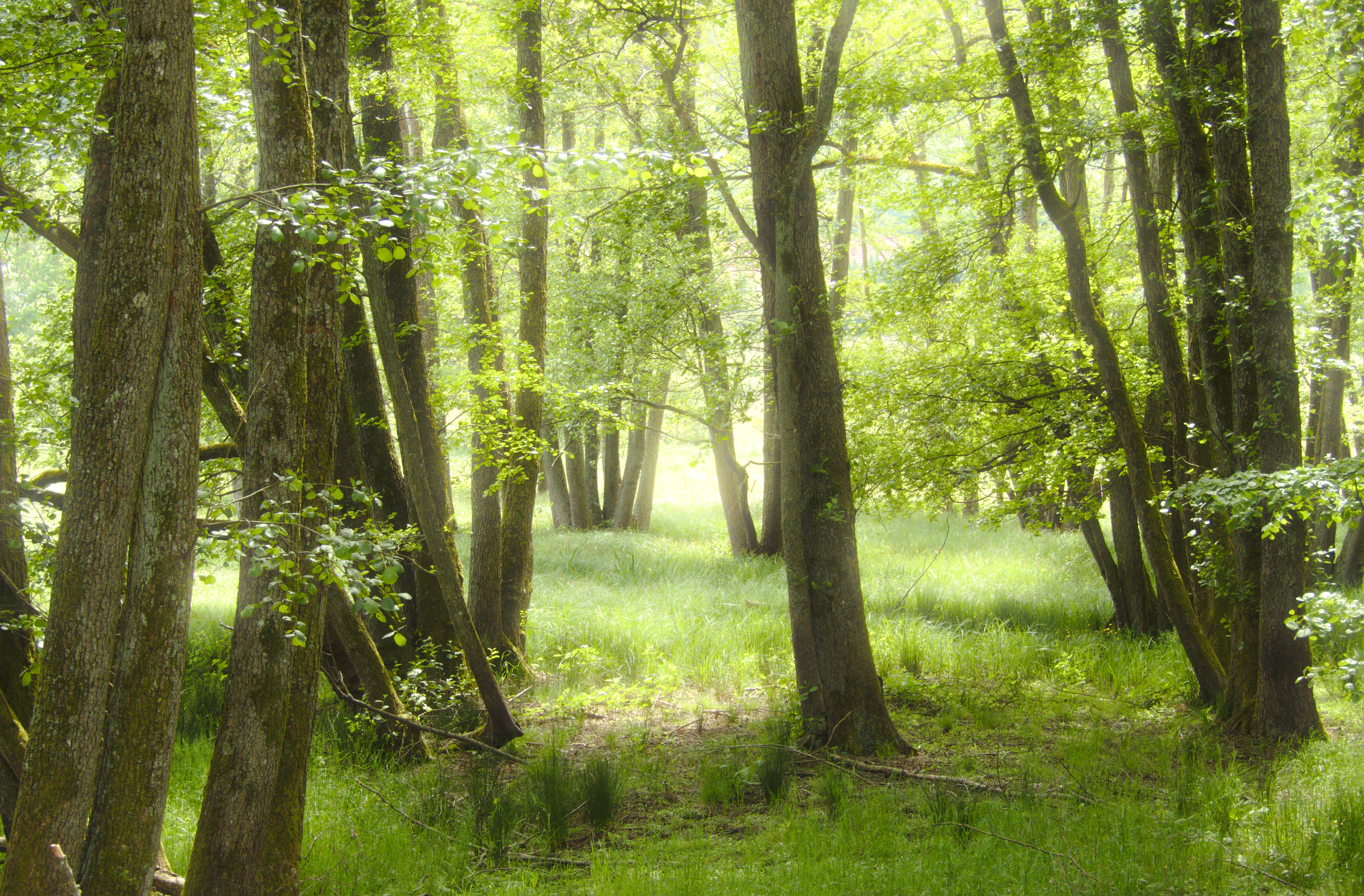
Wooded bogland (alder trees)

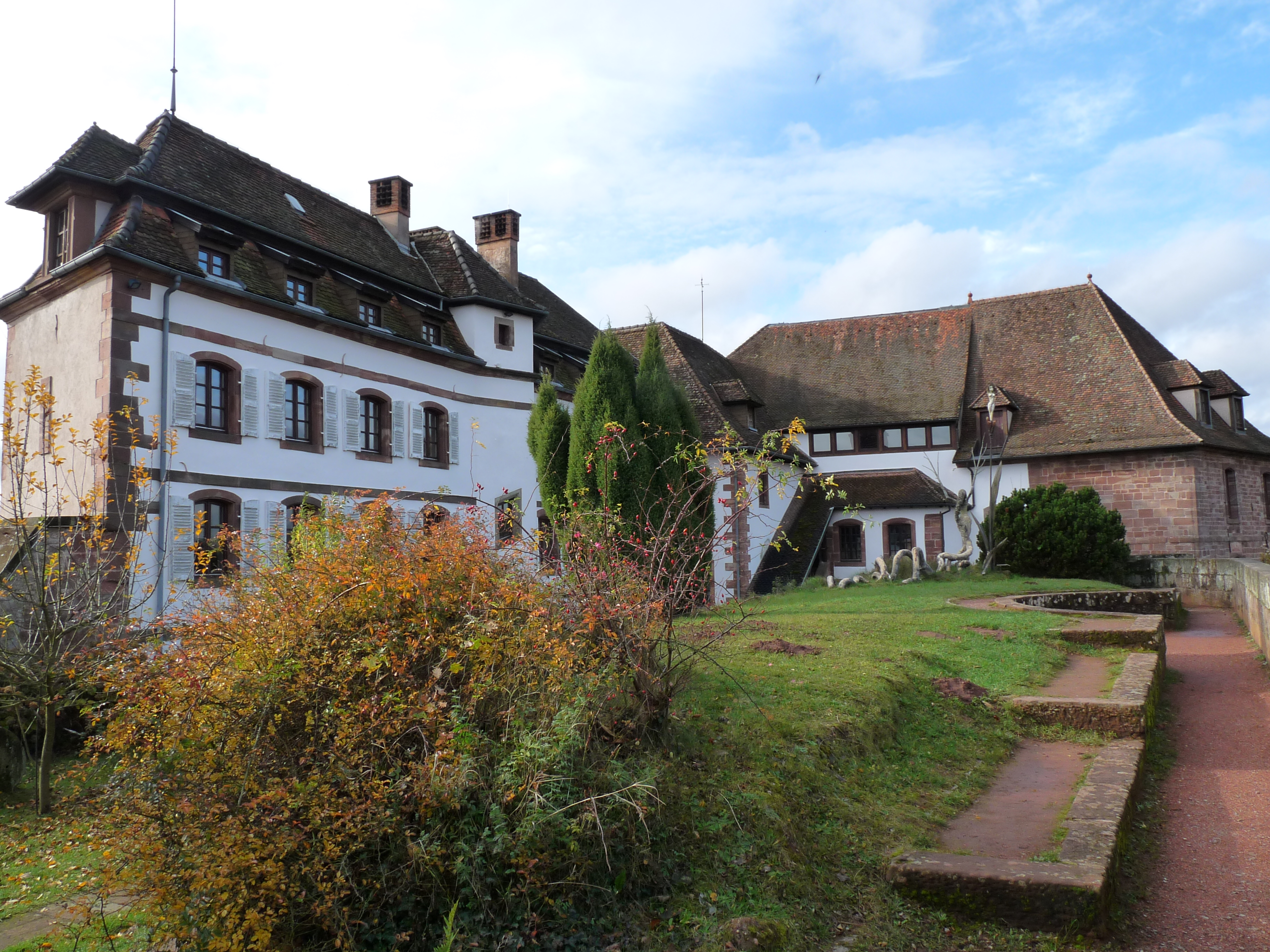
Château de La Petite-Pierre, the maison du Parc

== Member communes ==
The following communes are members of Northern Vosges PNR:

In Bas-Rhin:

- Adamswiller
- Asswiller
- Butten
- Cleebourg
- Climbach
- Dambach
- Dehlingen
- Diemeringen
- Domfessel
- Dossenheim-sur-Zinsel
- Drachenbronn-Birlenbach
- Durstel
- Eckartswiller
- Erckartswiller
- Ernolsheim-lès-Saverne
- Eschbourg
- Frœschwiller
- Frohmuhl
- Gœrsdorf
- Hinsbourg
- Hunspach
- Ingolsheim
- Ingwiller
- Keffenach
- Kutzenhausen
- La Petite-Pierre
- Lampertsloch
- Langensoultzbach
- Lembach
- Lichtenberg
- Lobsann
- Lohr
- Lorentzen
- Memmelshoffen
- Merkwiller-Pechelbronn
- Morsbronn-les-Bains
- Neuwiller-lès-Saverne
- Niederbronn-les-Bains
- Niedersteinbach
- Oberbronn
- Obersteinbach
- Offwiller
- Ottwiller
- Petersbach
- Pfalzweyer
- Preuschdorf
- Puberg
- Ratzwiller
- Reichshoffen
- Reipertswiller
- Retschwiller
- Rosteig
- Rothbach
- Rott
- Saint-Jean-Saverne
- Schœnbourg
- Soultz-sous-Forêts
- Sparsbach
- Struth
- Tieffenbach
- Volksberg
- Waldhambach
- Weinbourg
- Weislingen
- Weiterswiller
- Wimmenau
- Windstein
- Wingen
- Wingen-sur-Moder
- Wissembourg
- Wœrth
- Zinswiller
- Zittersheim

In Moselle:

- Baerenthal
- Bitche
- Bousseviller
- Breidenbach
- Éguelshardt
- Enchenberg
- Epping
- Erching
- Goetzenbruck
- Hanviller
- Haspelschiedt
- Hottviller
- Lambach
- Lemberg
- Lengelsheim
- Liederschiedt
- Loutzviller
- Meisenthal
- Montbronn
- Mouterhouse
- Nousseviller-lès-Bitche
- Obergailbach
- Ormersviller
- Phalsbourg
- Philippsbourg
- Rahling
- Reyersviller
- Rimling
- Rolbing
- Roppeviller
- Saint-Louis-lès-Bitche
- Schorbach
- Schweyen
- Siersthal
- Soucht
- Sturzelbronn
- Volmunster
- Waldhouse
- Walschbronn

== See also ==
- Palatinate Forest-North Vosges Biosphere Reserve
- List of regional natural parks of France
- Flora of the Vosges massif
