= Soucht =

- Commune
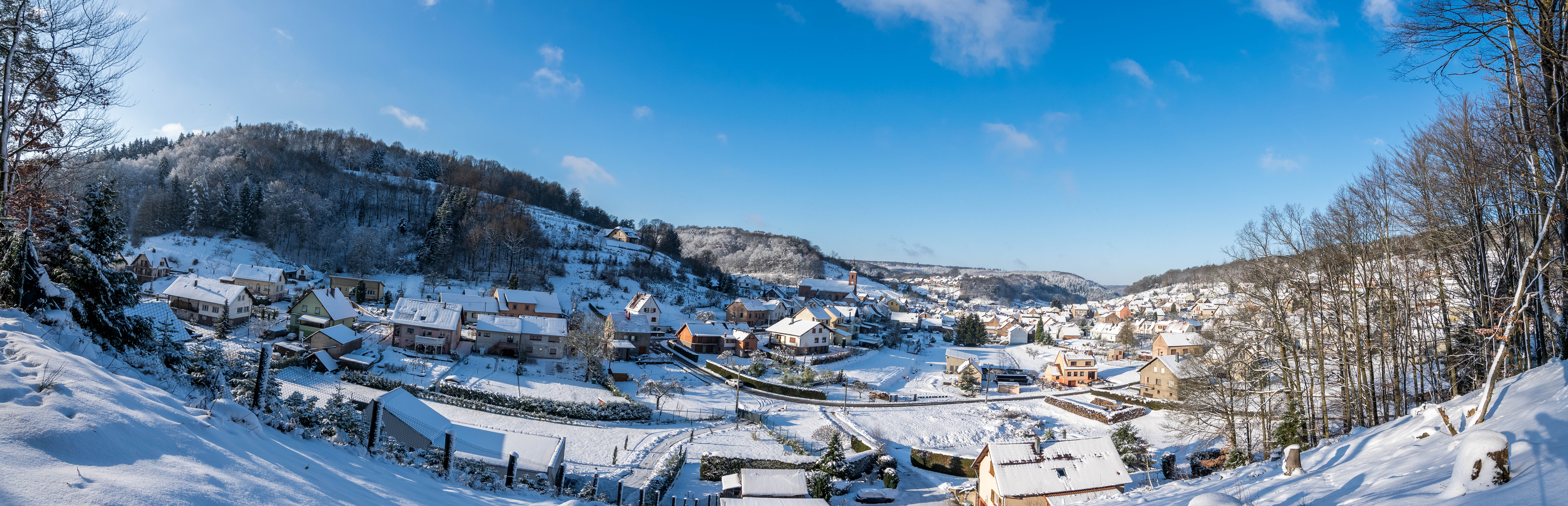
- A general view of Soucht

- Coat of arms
- Location of Soucht
- Location within France Location within Grand Est
- Coordinates: 48°57′33″N 7°20′10″E
- Country: France
- Region: Grand Est
- Department: Moselle
- Arrondissement: Sarreguemines
- Canton: Bitche
- Intercommunality: CC du Pays de Bitche

Government
  - Mayor (2020–2026): Christelle Burgun
- Area^{1}: 10.75 km^{2} (4.15 sq mi)
- Elevation: 351 m (1,152 ft)
- Highest elevation: 398 m (1,306 ft)
- Lowest elevation: 247 m (810 ft)
- Population (2023): 1,013
  - Density: 94.23/km^{2} (244.1/sq mi)
- Time zone: UTC+01:00 (CET)
  - Summer (DST): UTC+02:00 (CEST)
- INSEE/Postal code: 57658 /57960
- ^{1} French Land Register data, which excludes lakes, ponds, glaciers > 1 km^{2} (0.386 sq mi or 247 acres) and river estuaries.

Soucht (French pronunciation: [suxt]; German and Lorraine Franconian: Sucht) is a commune in the Moselle department of the Grand Est administrative region in north-eastern France.

The village is part of the Pays de Bitche and to the Northern Vosges Regional Nature Park. As of the 2013 France census, the village's population is 1,080. The inhabitants of the commune are known as Souchtois and Souchtoises.

== See also ==
- Communes of the Moselle department
