= Schmittviller =

- Commune
- Coat of arms
- Location of Schmittviller
- Location within France Location within Grand Est
- Coordinates: 49°00′21″N 7°11′02″E
- Country: France
- Region: Grand Est
- Department: Moselle
- Arrondissement: Sarreguemines
- Canton: Bitche
- Intercommunality: CC du Pays de Bitche

Government
  - Mayor (2020–2026): Olivier Hubrecht
- Area^{1}: 2.33 km^{2} (0.90 sq mi)
- Elevation: 370 m (1,210 ft)
- Highest elevation: 356 m (1,168 ft)
- Lowest elevation: 285 m (935 ft)
- Population (2023): 335
  - Density: 144/km^{2} (372/sq mi)
- Time zone: UTC+01:00 (CET)
  - Summer (DST): UTC+02:00 (CEST)
- INSEE/Postal code: 57636 /57412
- ^{1} French Land Register data, which excludes lakes, ponds, glaciers > 1 km^{2} (0.386 sq mi or 247 acres) and river estuaries.

Schmittviller (French pronunciation: [ʃmitvilɛʁ]; German: Schmittweiler; Lorraine Franconian: Schmittwiller) is a commune in the Moselle department of the Grand Est administrative region in north-eastern France.

The village belongs to the Pays de Bitche.

== See also ==
- Communes of the Moselle department
