= Rohrbach-lès-Bitche =

- Commune
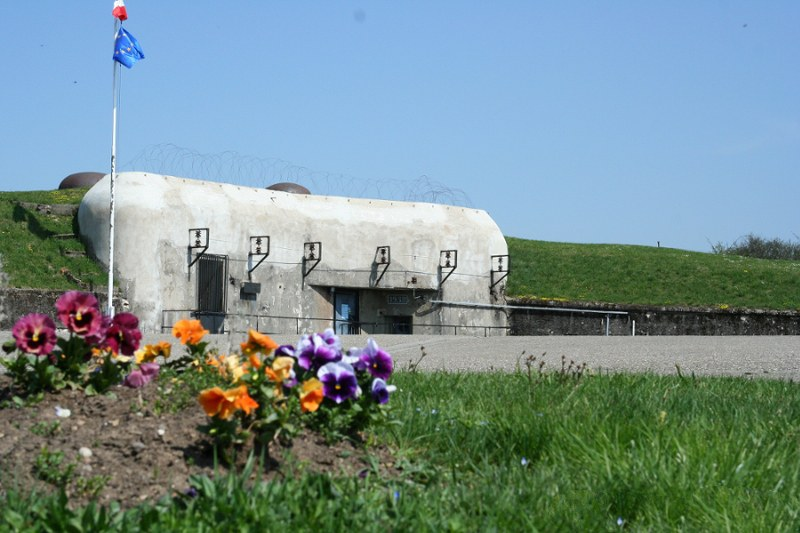
- The Ouvrage Rohrbach

- Coat of arms
- Location of Rohrbach-lès-Bitche
- Location within France Location within Grand Est
- Coordinates: 49°02′46″N 7°15′56″E
- Country: France
- Region: Grand Est
- Department: Moselle
- Arrondissement: Sarreguemines
- Canton: Bitche
- Intercommunality: CC du Pays de Bitche

Government
  - Mayor (2022–2026): Gabriel Scheh
- Area^{1}: 13.28 km^{2} (5.13 sq mi)
- Elevation: 306 m (1,004 ft)
- Highest elevation: 384 m (1,260 ft)
- Lowest elevation: 252 m (827 ft)
- Population (2023): 2,301
  - Density: 173.3/km^{2} (448.8/sq mi)
- Time zone: UTC+01:00 (CET)
  - Summer (DST): UTC+02:00 (CEST)
- INSEE/Postal code: 57589 /57410
- ^{1} French Land Register data, which excludes lakes, ponds, glaciers > 1 km^{2} (0.386 sq mi or 247 acres) and river estuaries.

Rohrbach-lès-Bitche (French pronunciation: [ʁɔʁbak lɛ bitʃ], lit. 'Rohrbach near Bitche'; German: Rohrbach bei Bitsch; Lorraine Franconian: Roerbach) is a commune in the Moselle department of the Grand Est administrative region in north-eastern France.

The village belongs to the Pays de Bitche.

== Geography ==
Rohrbach-lès-Bitche is crossed from west to east by the road connecting Sarreguemines to Bitche. The road towards Sarre-Union branches off in the centre of the village.

Located in the open country, at an elevation of around 260 metres, the village is dominated to the west by the 360-metre-tall Guckenberg, the last hill of the Lorraine plateau. It is one of the earliest villages of the Pays de Bitche. The Vosges pink sandstone appears on the outskirts of the commune, but is mostly covered by forest.

== Population ==
Historical population
Year	Pop.	±% p.a.
1968	1,623	—
1975	1,797	+1.47%
1982	2,019	+1.68%
1990	2,113	+0.57%
1999	2,115	+0.01%
2007	2,153	+0.22%
2012	2,079	−0.70%
2017	2,283	+1.89%
2023	2,301	+0.13%
Source: INSEE

== See also ==
- Communes of the Moselle department
