= Canton of Bitche =

Coordinates: 49.05°N 7.43°E

Bitche
- Canton
- Interactive map of Bitche
- Country: France
- Region: Grand Est
- Department: Moselle
- No. of communes: {{{nbcomm}}}

Government
  - Representatives (2021–2028): David Suck; Sophie Pastor
- Area: 588.89 km^{2} (227.37 sq mi)
- Population (2023): 33,136
  - Density: 56.269/km^{2} (145.73/sq mi)
- INSEE code: 57 02

The canton of Bitche is a canton of France, located in the Moselle department and the Grand Est region. Since the French canton reorganisation which came into effect in March 2015, the communes of the canton of Bitche are:

1. Achen
2. Baerenthal
3. Bettviller
4. Bining
5. Bitche
6. Bousseviller
7. Breidenbach
8. Éguelshardt
9. Enchenberg
10. Epping
11. Erching
12. Etting
13. Goetzenbruck
14. Gros-Réderching
15. Hanviller
16. Haspelschiedt
17. Hottviller
18. Lambach
19. Lemberg
20. Lengelsheim
21. Liederschiedt
22. Loutzviller
23. Meisenthal
24. Montbronn
25. Mouterhouse
26. Nousseviller-lès-Bitche
27. Obergailbach
28. Ormersviller
29. Petit-Réderching
30. Philippsbourg
31. Rahling
32. Reyersviller
33. Rimling
34. Rohrbach-lès-Bitche
35. Rolbing
36. Roppeviller
37. Saint-Louis-lès-Bitche
38. Schmittviller
39. Schorbach
40. Schweyen
41. Siersthal
42. Soucht
43. Sturzelbronn
44. Volmunster
45. Waldhouse
46. Walschbronn

== See also ==
- Cantons of the Moselle department
- Communes of the Moselle department
