= Lorraine Franconian =

West Central German dialect spoken in Lorraine

- Lottrìnger Plàtt
- Native to: France
- Region: Moselle
- Native speakers: (c. 360,000 cited 1962)
- Language family: Indo-European: Germanic; West Germanic; Weser-Rhine Germanic; Central German; West Central German; Rhenish Franconian; Pfälzisch–Lothringisch; Lorraine Franconian

Official status
- Recognised minority language in: France
- Regulated by: No official regulation

Language codes
- ISO 639-3: –
- Glottolog: loth1238 Lothringisch
- IETF: gmw-u-sd-fr57
- Dialects of Moselle. Those in purple areas are lumped under the term "Lorraine Franconian" when spoken in France.

- Luxembourgish, Moselle Franconian & Rhenish Franconian are all classified as Vulnerable by the UNESCO Atlas of the World's Languages in Danger (2010)

The language border around 1630

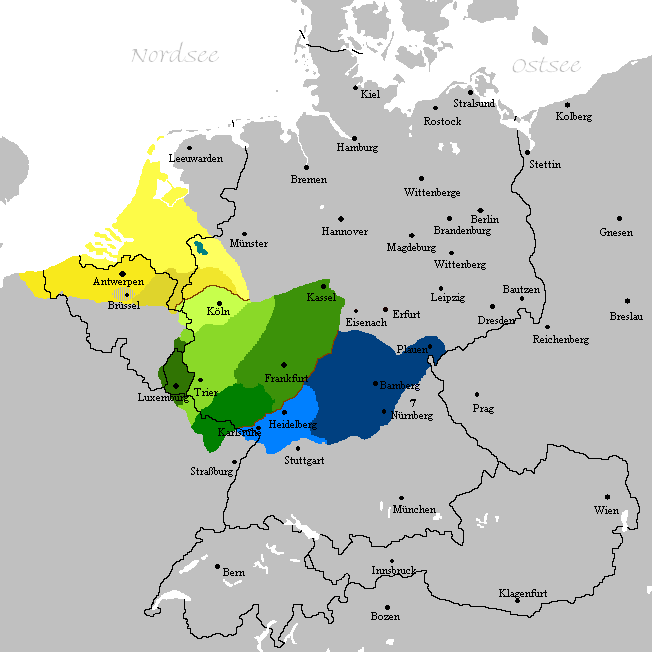
Franconian languages area: Central Franconian dialects in green.

Lorraine Franconian (native name: Plàtt or lottrìnger Plàtt; French: francique lorrain or platt lorrain; German: Lothringisch) is an ambiguous designation for dialects of West Central German (German: Westmitteldeutsch), a group of High German dialects spoken in the Moselle department of the former northeastern French region of Lorraine (See Linguistic boundary of Moselle).

== Description ==
The term Lorraine Franconian has multiple denotations. Some scholars use it to refer to the entire group of West Central German dialects spoken in the French Lorraine region. Others use it more narrowly to refer to the Moselle Franconian dialect spoken in the valley of the river Nied (in Pays de Nied, whose largest town is Boulay-Moselle), to distinguish it from the other two Franconian dialects spoken in Lorraine, Luxembourgish to the west and Rhine Franconian to the east.

The German term Lothringisch refers to Rhine Franconian spoken in Lorraine.

In 1806 there were 218,662 speakers of Lorraine Franconian in Moselle and 41,795 speakers in Meurthe.

In part due to the ambiguity of the term, estimates of the number of Lorraine Franconian speakers in France vary widely, ranging from 30,000 to 400,000 (which would make it the third most-spoken regional language in France, after Occitan and Alsatian).

The most reliable data comes from the Enquête famille carried out by INSEE (360,000 in the 1962 census) as part of the 1999 census, but it gives a somewhat indirect picture of the current situation (see Languages in France for discussion of this survey). About 78,000 people were reported to speak Lorraine Franconian, but fewer than 50,000 passed basic knowledge of the language on to their children. Another statistic illustrating the same point is that of all adult men who used Franconian regularly when they were 5, less than 30% use (or used) the language regularly with their own children.

== Bilingual signs ==
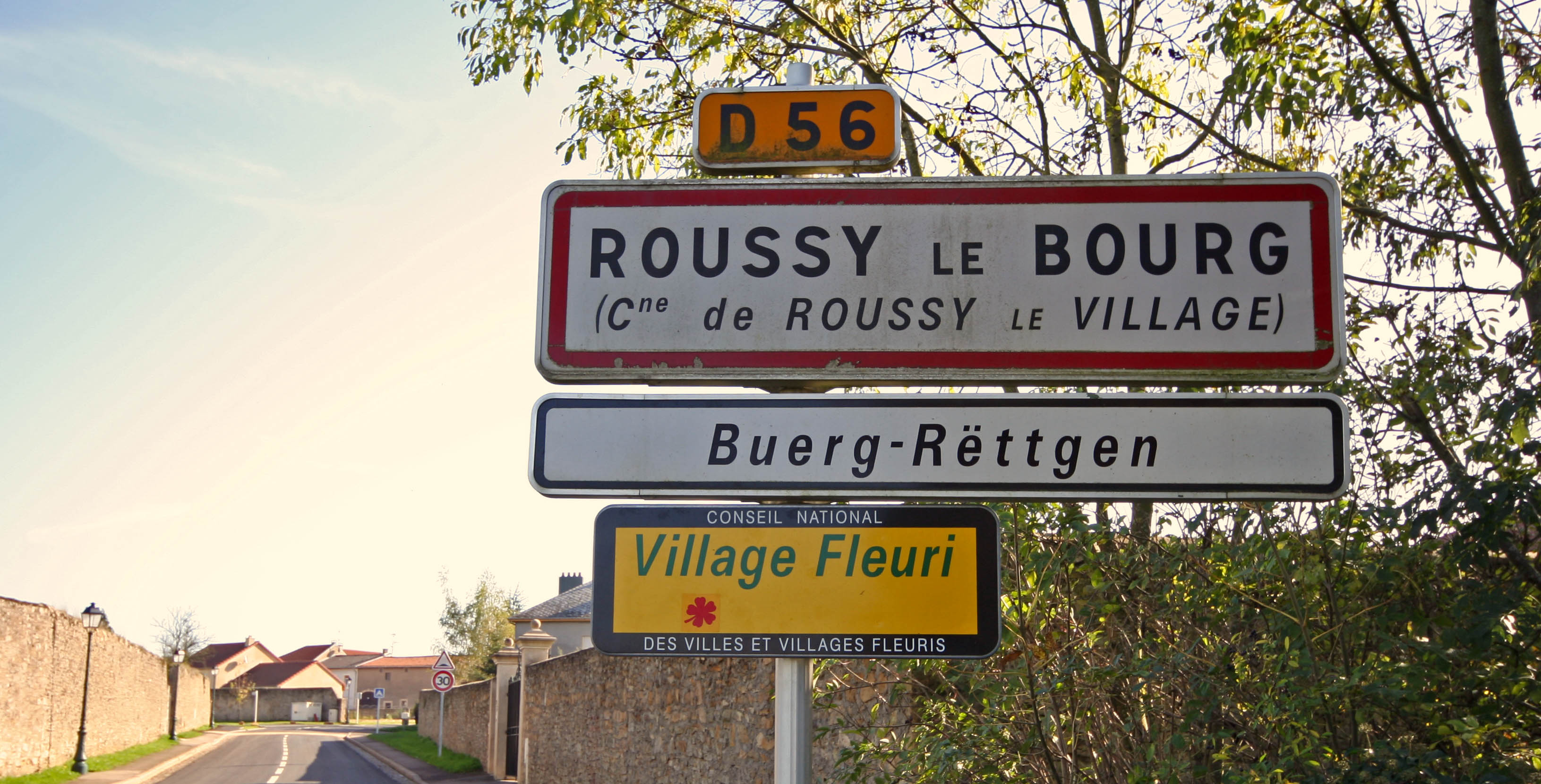

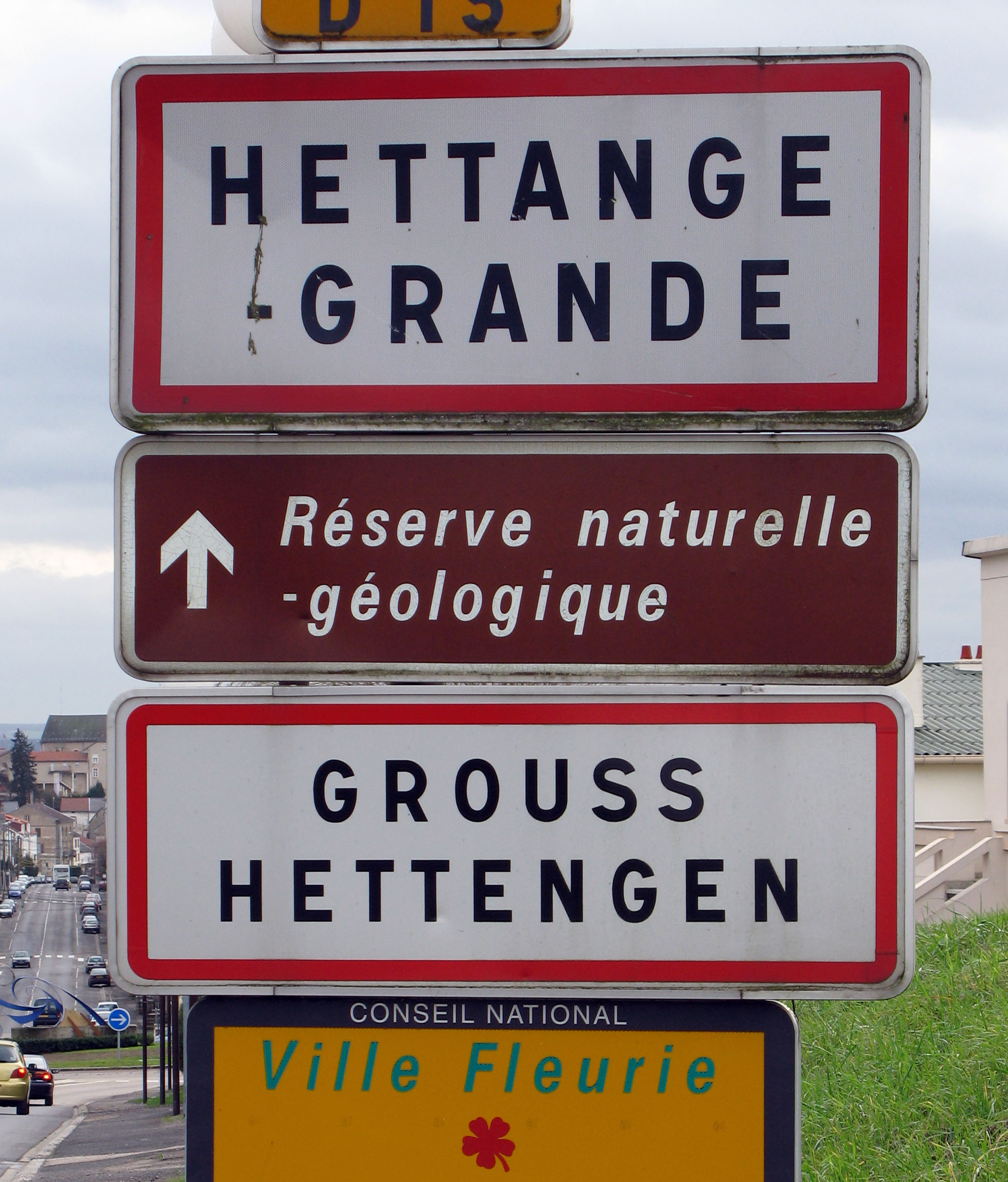

== Sources ==
- Auburtin, Éric. 2002. "Langues régionales et relations transfrontalières dans l’espace Saar-Lor-Lux". Hérodote 105, pp. 102–122.
- Héran, François, et al. 2002. "La dynamique des langues en France au fil du XX^{e} siècle". Population et sociétés 376. Paris: Institut National d'Études Démographiques (INED).
- Hughes, Stephanie. 2005. Bilingualism in North-East France with specific reference to Rhenish Franconian spoken by Moselle Cross-border (or frontier) workers. In Preisler, Bent, et al., eds. The Consequences of Mobility: Linguistic and Sociocultural Contact Zones. Roskilde, Denmark: Roskilde Universitetscenter: Institut for Sprog og Kultur. ISBN 87-7349-651-0.
- Kieffer, Jean-Louis. 2006. Le Platt Lorrain de poche. Assimil. ISBN 2-7005-0374-0
