= Canton of Sarreguemines-Campagne =

Former canton in Moselle, France

Coordinates: 49°03′33″N 7°01′20″E

- Former canton
- Location of the canton in the arrondissement of Sarreguemines
- Country: France
- Region: Grand Est
- Department: Moselle
- No. of communes: {{{nbcomm}}}
- Disbanded: 2015

Government
  - Representatives: Jean Karmann
- Area: 149.60 km^{2} (57.76 sq mi)
- Population (2012): 26,719
  - Density: 178.60/km^{2} (462.58/sq mi)

The canton of Sarreguemines-Campagne (French: Canton de Sarreguemines-Campagne) is a former French canton located in the department of Moselle in the Lorraine region (now part of Grand Est). It was one of the rare French cantons whose capital was not located in the canton. It is now part of the canton of Sarreguemines.

The last general councillor from this canton was Jean Karmann (DVD), elected in 1998.

== Composition ==
The canton of Sarreguemines-Campagne grouped together 21 municipalities and had 26,719 inhabitants (2012 census without double counts).

1. Bliesbruck
2. Blies-Ébersing
3. Blies-Guersviller
4. Frauenberg
5. Grosbliederstroff
6. Grundviller
7. Guebenhouse
8. Hambach
9. Hundling
10. Ippling
11. Lixing-lès-Rouhling
12. Loupershouse
13. Neufgrange
14. Remelfing
15. Rouhling
16. Sarreinsming
17. Wiesviller
18. Wittring
19. Woelfling-lès-Sarreguemines
20. Woustviller
21. Zetting
