= Annexations of Alsace–Lorraine =

Region between the Meuse and Rhine rivers

Located between the Meuse and Rhine rivers, Alsace and Lorraine were at the center of the Carolingian Empire during the Middle Ages. The territories were initially part of the Western Roman Empire and later annexed by the Holy Roman Empire. In the 16th century, they were annexed by the Kingdom of France. Part of these same territories were then annexed by the German Empire in the 19th century, before returning to France at the end of World War I. During World War II (1940-1945), they were annexed again by the Third Reich, before final return to French rule at the end of the war.

== Historical context ==

The name "Lorraine" comes from the Frank King "Lothair", grandson of Charlemagne. The territory has been at the center of the Carolingian Empire during the 8th and 9th centuries. Before the Middle Ages, the historical regions of Lorraine and Alsace were at the Eastern border of the Western Roman Empire, along the Rhine river, and later became part of the fragmented Holy Roman Empire. During the 16th century, the territories of the Three Bishoprics, Strasbourg the cities of the Décapole, and the Duchy of Lorraine joined the Kingdom of France.

From 1871 to 1918, and then from 1940 to 1945, part of these territories were annexed by the newly created German Empire and by the Third Reich.

== French annexations (16th–18th centuries) ==
=== Austrasian March ===
The fragmentation of the territories of the Holy Roman Empire, corresponding today to the historical regions of Lorraine and Alsace, made it relatively easy for the Kingdom of France to pursue a policy of annexation based on a "natural" frontier, the Rhine. The territories of the Three Bishoprics, Strasbourg, and the cities of the Décapole, then those of the Duchy of Bar and the Duchy of Lorraine were annexed to France.

=== Annexation of Alsace (1648–1697) ===
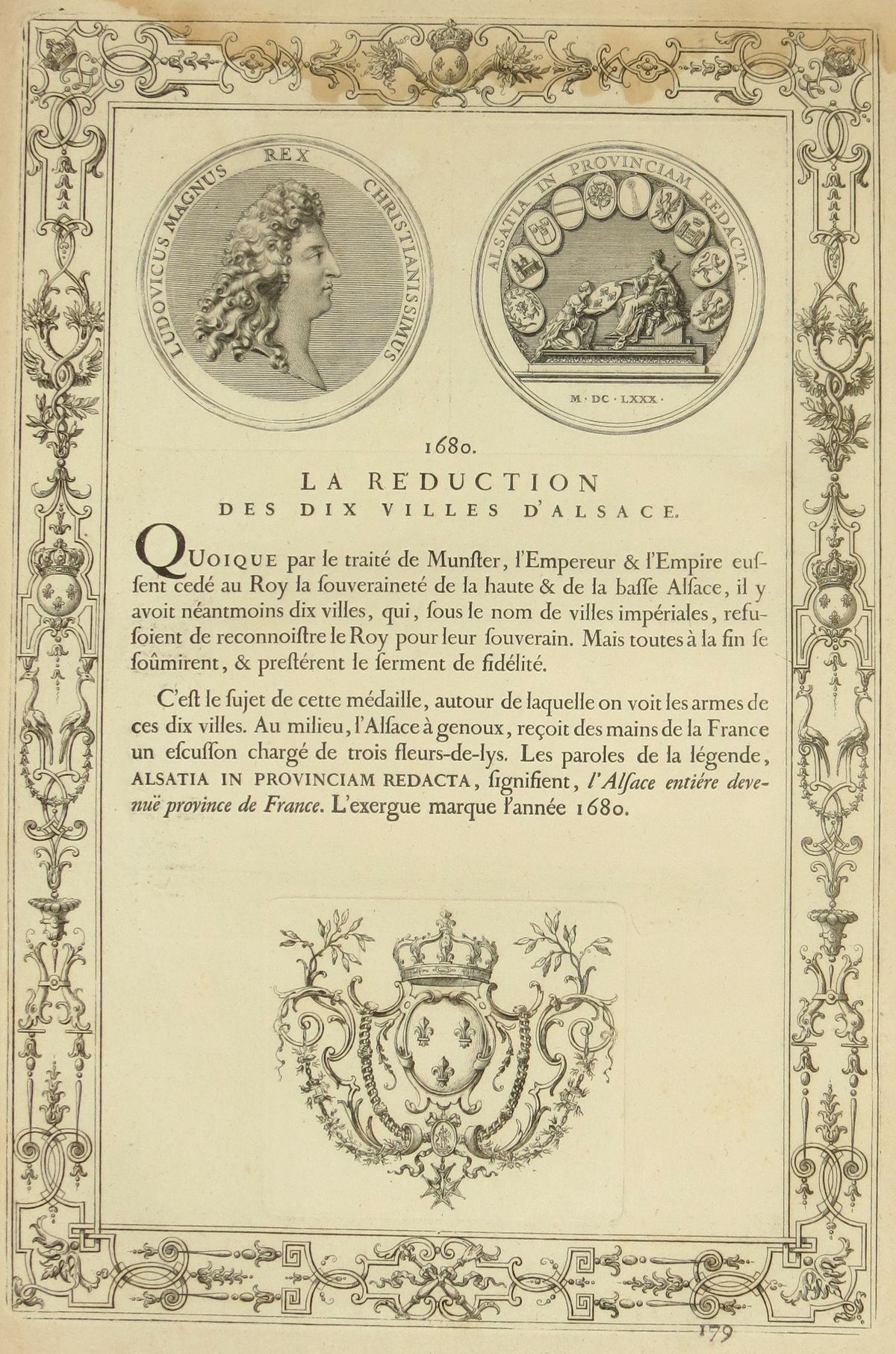
Document describing the creation of the medal commemorating the "Reduction of the ten towns of Alsace in 1680", from Médailles sur les principaux évènements du règne entier de Louis le Grand, avec des explications historiques by the Académie des inscriptions et belles-lettres, 1723.

On October 24, 1648, the rivalry between the House of Austria and the Bourbons led to the Treaty of Westphalia, which ended the Thirty Years' War. France, the great victor of this long conflict, expanded its territory eastward: Metz, Toul, and Verdun were recognized as de jure French after a century of de facto protectorate.

France annexed part of Alsace, in particular the Landgraviate of Upper Alsace (formerly the County of Sundgau) and the cities of the Alsatian Décapole.

In 1675, the Battle of Turckheim, lost by the Imperials, allowed France to annex new territories in Alsace.

By creating Chambres de Reunion in Metz, Besançon, and Brisach, Louis XIV was able to annex new territories without fighting: this was the Politique des Réunions. Thus, by a decree of March 22, 1680, the Council of Alsace annexed to the Kingdom of France the bailiwicks of Kutzenhausen, Bergzabern, Annweiler, Guttemberg, Gossersweiler, Vogelbourg, Otbourg, Cleebourg, Falkenbourg, the villages of Rechtenbach, half of the village of Dambach, and the castle and village of Riedseltz.

By decree of August 9, 1680, the Council of Alsace united the Counties of Hanau-Lichtenberg and Oberbrunn, the Barony of Fleckenstein, the bailiwicks of Gressenstein, Wafslen, Barr, Illkirch, Marlem, Bischwiller and Reichshoffen, and the bailiwicks of Sulz, Guebwiller, Rouffach, Marckolsheim and Marmoutier, the county of Dagsbourg (Linange-Dabo), the principality of La Petite-Pierre and Murbach, the county of Horbourg, the seigneury of Riquewihr, the Ban de la Roche, the lands and seigneuries of the bishopric of Strasbourg and Saint-Hippolyte.

In September 1697, with the signing of the Treaty of Ryswick, Louis XIV definitively annexed four-fifths of Alsace to France, including Strasbourg and the towns of the Décapole.

=== Annexation of Lorraine (1552–1766) ===
In 1301, because of his opposition to the King of France, the Count of Bar was forced to pay tribute to the French sovereign for the part of his county on the left bank of the Meuse, henceforth known as the Barrois mouvants. The eastern part of the County of Bar and the Duchy of Lorraine remained part of the Holy Roman Empire.

As an integral part of the Holy Roman Empire, the free cities of Metz, Toul, and Verdun and the adjoining episcopal principalities were de facto annexed to France in April 1552 by King Henry II of France, who was allied with the German Protestants.

Henri II also imposed a francophone regent on the young Duke of Lorraine and Bar, Charles III, who was subsequently elevated to the French court. In 1633, despite an earlier commitment to respect the particular customs of the Messins, Toulois, and Verdunois, the Kingdom of France established a parliament in Metz with jurisdiction over the Three Bishoprics.

In 1648, the Treaty of Westphalia annexed the bishoprics and imperial cities de jure.

In February 1661, with the Treaty of Vincennes, the King of France returned the Duchy of Bar to the Duke of Lorraine in exchange for several villages in Lorraine, to create a passage that would allow him to reach Alsace directly without passing through a foreign country. The capital and the duchy were occupied again from 1670 to 1697.

The annexationist policy of the Réunions continued in Lorraine.

The Chamber of Metz successively united:

- By a decree of April 12, 1680, the castle and county of Veldenz.
- By a first decree of April 15, 1680, the lands and castellanies of Condé-sur-Moselle and Conflans-en-Jarnisy.
- By a second decree of April 15, 1680, the town, castle, and land of Commercy.
- By a decree of April 30, 1680, the county of Vaudémont, the county of Chaligny, and the castellany of Turquestein-Blancrupt.
- By a first decree of May 6, 1680, the town and castle of Épinal.
- By a second decree of May 6, 1680, the town and castellany of Sarrebourg.
- By a decree of May 10, 1680, the castle, town, and seigneury of Nomeny and the land and ban of Delme.
- By a first decree of May 20, 1680, the castle and town of Hombourg and the town of Saint-Avold.
- By a second decree of May 20, 1680, the town, castle, castellany, and seigneury of Albe (Sarralbe).
- By a decree of May 23, 1680, the town, lands, and seigneury of Marsal.
- By a first decree of May 29, 1680, the castle and seigneury of Sampigny.
- By a second decree of May 29, 1680, the castle, town, castellany and provostry of Hattonchâtel.
- By a decree of June 6, 1680, the lands and seigneuries of Salm and Pierre-Percée.
- By decree of June 12, 1680, the town, castle, and barony of Apremont.
- By decree of June 13, 1680, the land and seigneury of Mars-la-Tour.
- By decree of June 14, 1680, the town of Blâmont and the lands and seigneuries of Mandres-aux-Quatre-Tours, Deneuvre, and Amermont.
- By decree of June 21, 1680, the castle of Lutzelbourg.
- By a decree of June 27, 1680, the land and seigneury of Briey.
- By a first decree of June 28, 1680, the county of Deux-Ponts.
- By a second decree of June 28, 1680, the castle, county, and seigneury of Castres.
- By a decree of July 4, 1680, the town and seigneury of Dieuze.
- By a decree of July 8, 1680, the castle, town and county of Sarrebruck.
- By a first decree of July 11, 1680, the county of Sarrewerden and Bouquenom.
- By a second decree of July 11, 1680, the town, land and seigneury of Ottwiller.
- By a first decree of July 15, 1680, the land and seigneury of Bousseviller.
- By a second decree of July 15, 1680, the lands and seigneuries of La Marck, Marmonstier and Ochsenstein.
- By a third decree of July 15, 1680, the castle and seigneury of Trognon.
- By a decree of August 16, 1680, the seigneury of Sierck and the town of Port (Saint-Nicolas).
- By a decree of September 16, 1680, the castle, land and seigneury of Créhange.
- By a first decree of October 24, 1680, the town, land and seigneury of Virton.
- By a second decree of October 24, 1680, the castle, land, and manor of Bitche.
- By a first decree of November 7, 1680, the castle, land, and manor of Oberstein.
- By a second decree of November 7, 1680, the castle, land and seigneury of Rembercourt-aux-Pots.
- By a decree of November 28, 1680, the castle and town of Mussey.
- By decree of December 5, 1680, the castle, land and manor of Réchicourt.
- By decree of December 9, 1680, the town of Étain.
- By decree of December 12, 1680, the county of Morhange.
- By decree of December 23, 1680, the land and seigneury of Domèvre.
- By decree of December 26, 1680, the town and seigneury of Gondreville.
- By decree of March 6, 1681, the town and seigneury of Neufcastle.
- By decree of March 10, 1681, the towns and seigneuries of Arrancy and Pierrevillers.
- By decree of April 21, 1681, the county of Chiny.
- By decree of May 16, 1683, the county of Vaudémont.
- By decree of June 2, 1683, the lordships, provostships and castellanies of Pont-à-Mousson, Saint-Mihiel, and others.

The Treaty of Ryswick gave the Barrois and Lorraine their independence and their rightful sovereign, Leopold I. The young Duke, the Emperor's nephew, married a niece of Louis XIV, Elisabeth Charlotte d'Orléans, who paradoxically became the driving force behind resistance to French annexation.

In 1702, the War of the Spanish Succession was the pretext for a fourth French occupation of the duchies of Bar and Lorraine. In 1733, the War of the Polish Succession had the same effect.

To facilitate his marriage and election as head of the Holy Roman Empire, Duke François III of Lorraine agreed, despite his mother's objections, to exchange his patrimonial duchies for Tuscany. The Duchy of Bar and the Duchy of Lorraine were given for life to Stanislas Leszczynski, father-in-law of Louis XV, the dethroned King of Poland. It was agreed that upon the death of the sovereign, Barrois and Lorraine would become French. Stanislas left the administration of the duchy to his son-in-law and he died in 1766.

=== Annexations of principalities and enclaves (1766–1814) ===
From 1769 to 1786, a series of treaties between France and the princes of the Empire gradually regularized the border. In many places, watercourses marked the boundary; many enclaves on either side disappeared, but the border still did not consist of a single boundary.

During the French Revolution, the following territories became part of France (year of annexation in parentheses):

- County of Kriechingen (1793).
- County of Dagsburg (1793).
- County of Saarwerden (1793).
- Obersteinbach, part of the Landgraviate of Hesse-Darmstadt (1793).
- County of Montbéliard (1793).
- Principality of Salm-Salm (1793).
- Lordship of Lixing (1795).
- Austrian enclave of Manderen (1795).
- Zetting-Dieding, an exclave of the Empire (1795 or 1797).
- Hundling, an exclave of the Empire (1797).
- Rouhling, an exclave of the Empire (1797 or 1798).
- Republic of Mulhouse, allied with the Swiss Confederacy (1798).

== German annexations (19th–20th centuries) ==
=== Treaties of Paris (1814 and 1815) ===
In Lorraine, under the Treaty of Paris (1814), Moselle lost several communes and hamlets to Prussia, including the Canton of Tholey and seven communes in the Canton of Sierck-les-Bains.

In 1815, part of the Moselle cantons of Relling and Sarrelouis and all of the cantons of Saarbrücken and Saint-Jean became Prussian. Certain communes and hamlets in these cantons later returned to French territory under the demarcation treaty of October 23, 1829.

In Alsace, the Bas-Rhin lost all its territories north of the Lauter in 1815. Some of these territories had been gained first by the Treaty of Paris in 1814. This included the 4 cantons of Bergzabern, Candel, Dahn, and Landau.

=== German annexation of Alsace-Moselle (1871–1919) ===
In 1871, following the Franco-Prussian War of 1870, part of these territories, corresponding to the modern departments of Bas-Rhin, Haut-Rhin, and Moselle, became part of the German Empire. These territories, considered strategic by the Germans as they extended the border beyond the Rhine and included the strongholds of Metz and Strasbourg, were ceded in two stages.

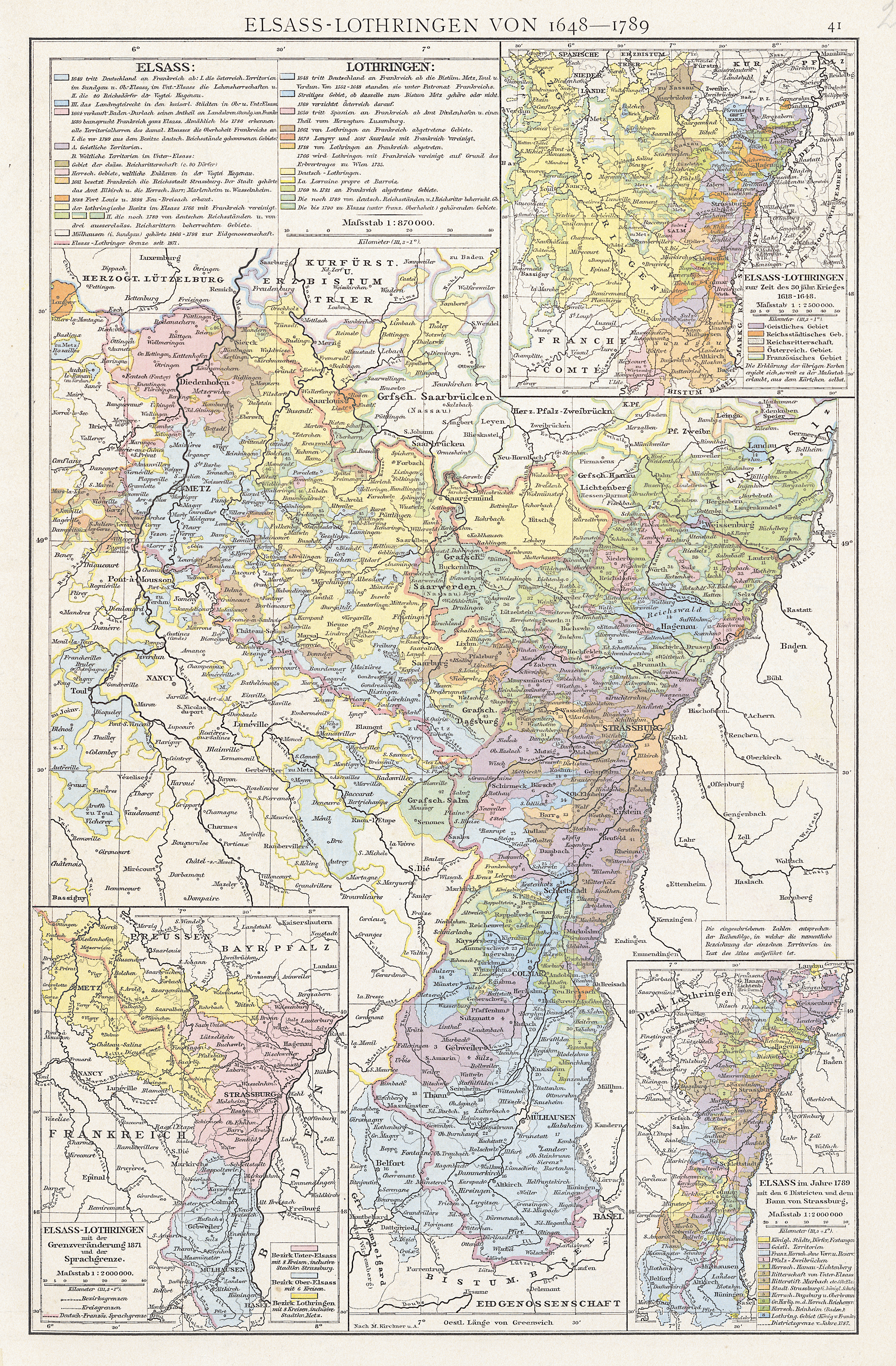
Territory ceded to Germany in 1871 and its pre-1790 administrative entities.

In a letter justifying the decision to annex these territories to a unified Germany, Emperor William explained to Empress Eugenie that the real motivation was strictly military, using the annexed territories as a military glacis to keep the French border away from the Rhine and Meuse rivers. Thus, the Welches valleys of Alsace and the Metz region, not following the linguistic border, found themselves "imperial territory" under the official name of "Alsace-Lorraine" and the direct administration of Emperor William.

The preliminary peace treaty of February 26, 1871, put an end to the fighting between France and Germany. The Treaty of Frankfurt (May 10, 1871) established the terms of peace. In addition to a substantial indemnity, France had to cede part of its territory to the Reich. In Alsace, the departments of Bas-Rhin and Haut-Rhin became German, except for the arrondissement of Belfort. In Lorraine, the former department of Moselle, except for Briey, the arrondissements of Château-Salins and Sarrebourg, which belonged to the former department of Meurthe, and the cantons of Saales and Schirmeck became German.

Until the adoption of the Constitution of 1911, Alsace-Moselle was governed directly by the Emperor and there were many tensions, the most famous of which was the Zabern Affair, which revealed the tensions between the inhabitants and the central power. From November 1918 until the signing of the Treaty of Versailles on June 28, 1919, the region was occupied by France in the application of the provisions of the Armistice of November 11, 1918, before becoming an integral part of the French nation again under article 27 of the Peace Treaty.

=== De facto annexation of Alsace-Moselle (1940–1945) ===
After the defeat of the French armies and the withdrawal of the British troops, the signing of the Armistice on June 22, 1940 provided for the occupation of northern France by the armies of the Third Reich.

The Nazi regime seized the opportunity to occupy Alsace and Moselle, despite the inviolability of the French borders, as stipulated in the armistice. Germany therefore expelled French citizens who were too demonstrative in their refusal, and foreigners whom they considered to be German citizens. They proceeded to conscript young Alsatians-Mosellans under the Nazi flag, leading to the tragedy of the Malgré-nous. The victory of the Allies and the liberation of France at the end of 1944 and the beginning of 1945 put an end to this last annexation.

== See also ==
=== Bibliography ===
- Parisot, Robert (1922). Histoire de Lorraine : duché de Lorraine, duché de Bar, trois Evêchés, de 1552 à 1789 (in French). Vol. 2. Auguste Picard.
- Cabourdin, Guy (1993). Histoire de la Lorraine : Les temps modernes, de la Renaissance à la guerre de Trente ans (in French). Vol. 1. Presses Universitaires de Nancy. ISBN 978-2-86480-344-7.
- Cabourdin, Guy (1993). Histoire de la Lorraine : Les temps modernes, de la paix de Westphalie à la fin de l'ancien régime (in French). Vol. 2. Presses Universitaires de Nancy. ISBN 978-2-86480-539-7.
- Roth, François (1993). Histoire de la Lorraine: L'époque contemporaine, de la Révolution à la Grande Guerre (in French). Presses Universitaires de Nancy. ISBN 978-2864805809.
- Poole, Marion (1917). Les problèmes de l'Alsace-Lorraine après l'annexion chez quelques romanciers contemporains (in French).
- Goeuriot, Kévin (21 February 2023). "Comment la Lorraine a été annexée par la France". Le Lorraine (in French).

=== Related articles ===
- Alsace–Lorraine: the Reichsland established in 1871.
