= Rémering-lès-Puttelange =

- Commune
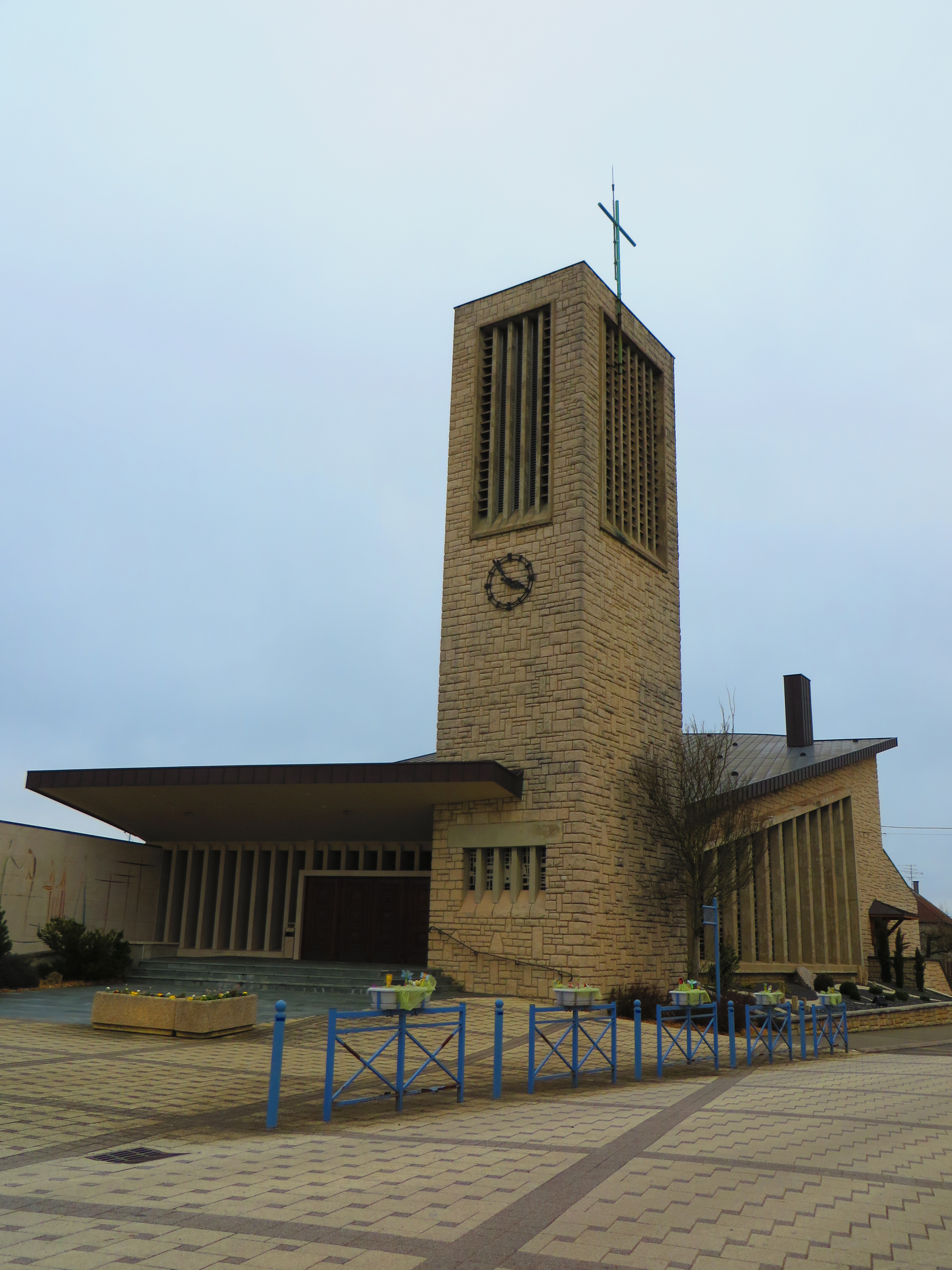
- The church in Rémering-lès-Puttelange

- Coat of arms
- Location of Rémering-lès-Puttelange
- Location within France Location within Grand Est
- Coordinates: 49°02′10″N 6°56′25″E
- Country: France
- Region: Grand Est
- Department: Moselle
- Arrondissement: Sarreguemines
- Canton: Sarralbe
- Intercommunality: CA Sarreguemines Confluences

Government
  - Mayor (2020–2026): Jean-Luc Echivard
- Area^{1}: 9.24 km^{2} (3.57 sq mi)
- Elevation: 200 m (660 ft)
- Highest elevation: 263 m (863 ft)
- Lowest elevation: 219 m (719 ft)
- Population (2023): 1,050
  - Density: 114/km^{2} (294/sq mi)
- Time zone: UTC+01:00 (CET)
  - Summer (DST): UTC+02:00 (CEST)
- INSEE/Postal code: 57571 /57510
- ^{1} French Land Register data, which excludes lakes, ponds, glaciers > 1 km^{2} (0.386 sq mi or 247 acres) and river estuaries.

Rémering-lès-Puttelange (French pronunciation: [ʁemʁɛ̃ lɛ pytlɑ̃ʒ], literally Rémering near Puttelange; German: Remeringen) is a commune in the Moselle department in Grand Est in north-eastern France.

== See also ==
- Communes of the Moselle department
