= Lucien Schmitthäusler =

French writer (1935–2020)

- Born: 5 February 1935; Sarreguemines, France
- Died: 6 April 2020 (aged 85); Rouhling, France
- Occupation: Writer

Lucien Schmitthäusler (5 February 1935 – 6 April 2020) was a French writer and educator.

== Biography ==
Schmitthäusler's mother tongue was Rhenish Francic. He wrote poetry and stories in this language, with other works in French and German.

Like many people in Moselle his age, Schmitthäusler learned German in primary school, and French after the Liberation of Paris. He worked as a nurse and a specialized doctor in Alsace. After retirement he lived in Weyersheim and Sarreinsming.

His works were often published by magazine Paraple via the association Gau un Griis. His books, many of which were published in multiple languages, are widely available in France and Germany.

Lucien Schmitthäusler died on 6 April 2020 in Rouhling at the age of 85.
