= Nelling =

- Commune
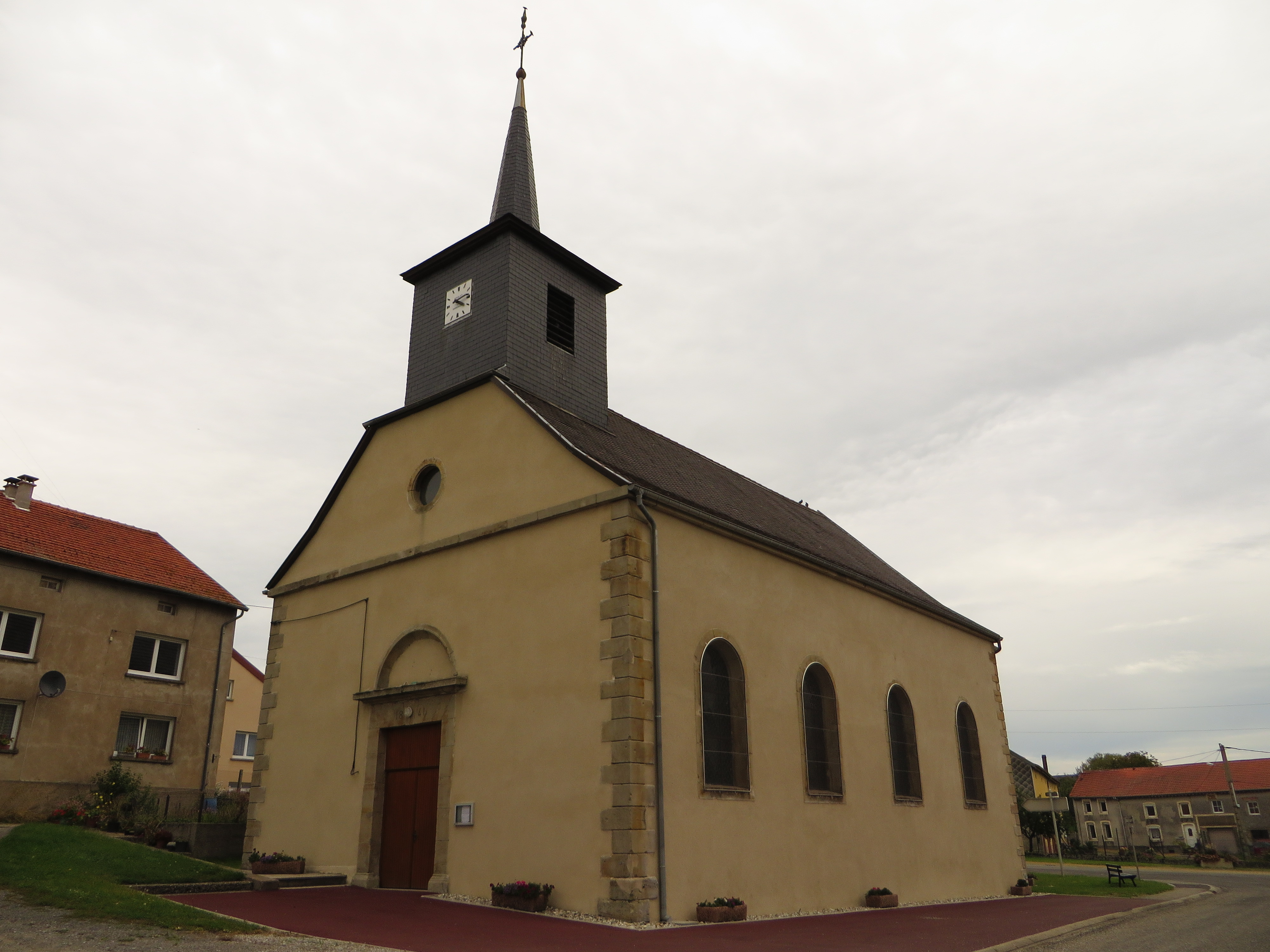
- The church in Nelling

- Coat of arms
- Location of Nelling
- Location within France Location within Grand Est
- Coordinates: 48°57′55″N 6°52′04″E
- Country: France
- Region: Grand Est
- Department: Moselle
- Arrondissement: Sarreguemines
- Canton: Sarralbe
- Intercommunality: CA Sarreguemines Confluences

Government
  - Mayor (2020–2026): Christophe Thiel
- Area^{1}: 7.4 km^{2} (2.9 sq mi)
- Elevation: 220 m (720 ft)
- Highest elevation: 252 m (827 ft)
- Lowest elevation: 215 m (705 ft)
- Population (2023): 266
  - Density: 36/km^{2} (93/sq mi)
- Time zone: UTC+01:00 (CET)
  - Summer (DST): UTC+02:00 (CEST)
- INSEE/Postal code: 57497 /57670
- ^{1} French Land Register data, which excludes lakes, ponds, glaciers > 1 km^{2} (0.386 sq mi or 247 acres) and river estuaries.

Nelling (French pronunciation: [nɛlɛ̃]; German: Nellingen) is a commune in the Moselle department in Grand Est in north-eastern France.

== See also ==
- Communes of the Moselle department
