= Holving =

- Commune
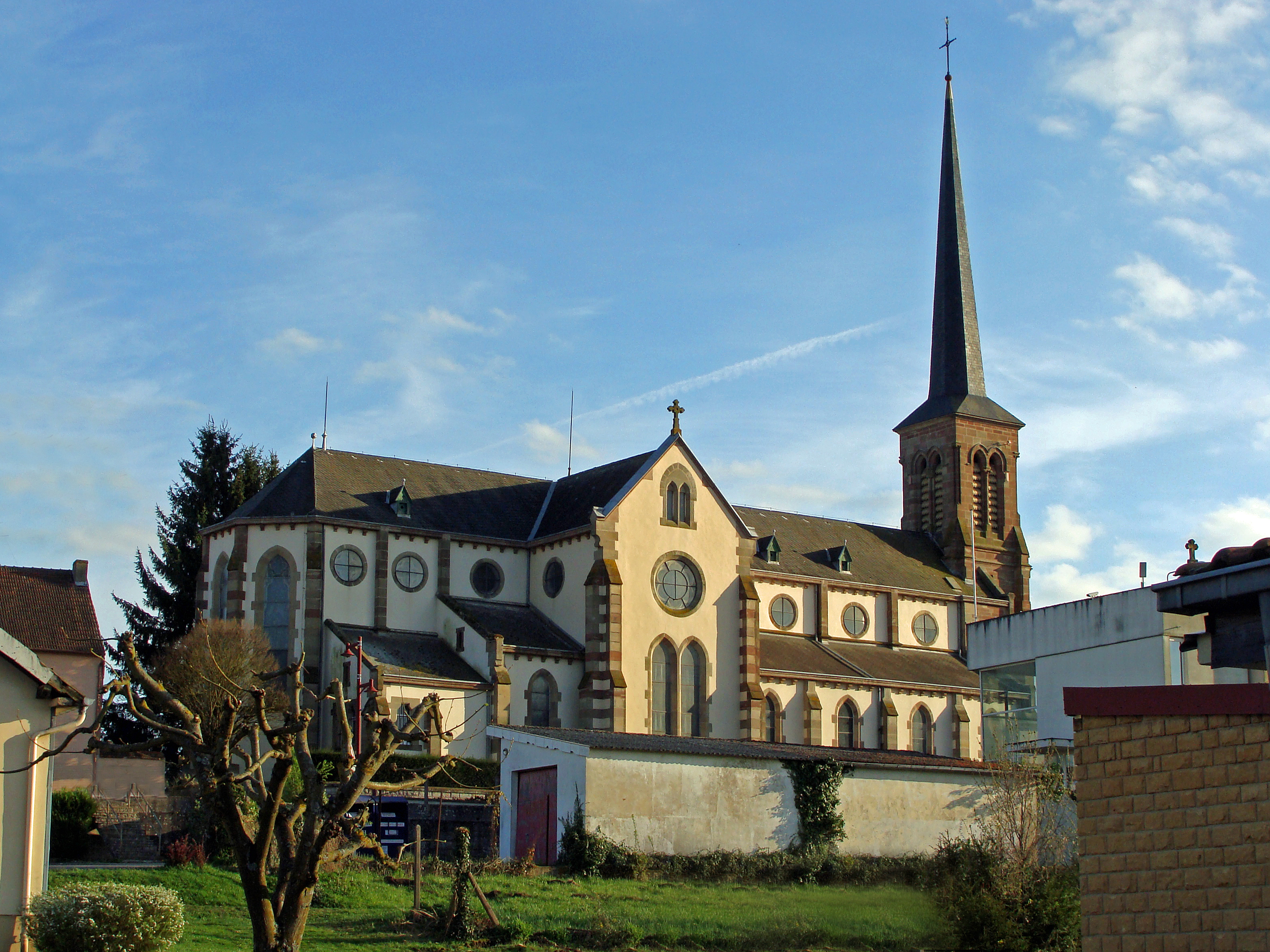
- The church in Holving

- Coat of arms
- Location of Holving
- Location within France Location within Grand Est
- Coordinates: 49°00′40″N 6°57′52″E
- Country: France
- Region: Grand Est
- Department: Moselle
- Arrondissement: Sarreguemines
- Canton: Sarralbe
- Intercommunality: CA Sarreguemines Confluences

Government
  - Mayor (2020–2026): Bernard Clavé
- Area^{1}: 10.75 km^{2} (4.15 sq mi)
- Elevation: 232 m (761 ft)
- Highest elevation: 263 m (863 ft)
- Lowest elevation: 214 m (702 ft)
- Population (2023): 1,268
  - Density: 118.0/km^{2} (305.5/sq mi)
- Time zone: UTC+01:00 (CET)
  - Summer (DST): UTC+02:00 (CEST)
- INSEE/Postal code: 57330 /57510
- ^{1} French Land Register data, which excludes lakes, ponds, glaciers > 1 km^{2} (0.386 sq mi or 247 acres) and river estuaries.

Holving (French pronunciation: [ɔlvɛ̃]) is a commune in the Moselle department in Grand Est in north-eastern France.

Localities of the commune: Ballering, Bettring, Diederfing, Hinsing, Hirbach, Netzwinkel, Schmalhof, Weiherfeld.

== See also ==
- Communes of the Moselle department
