= Hilsprich =

- Commune
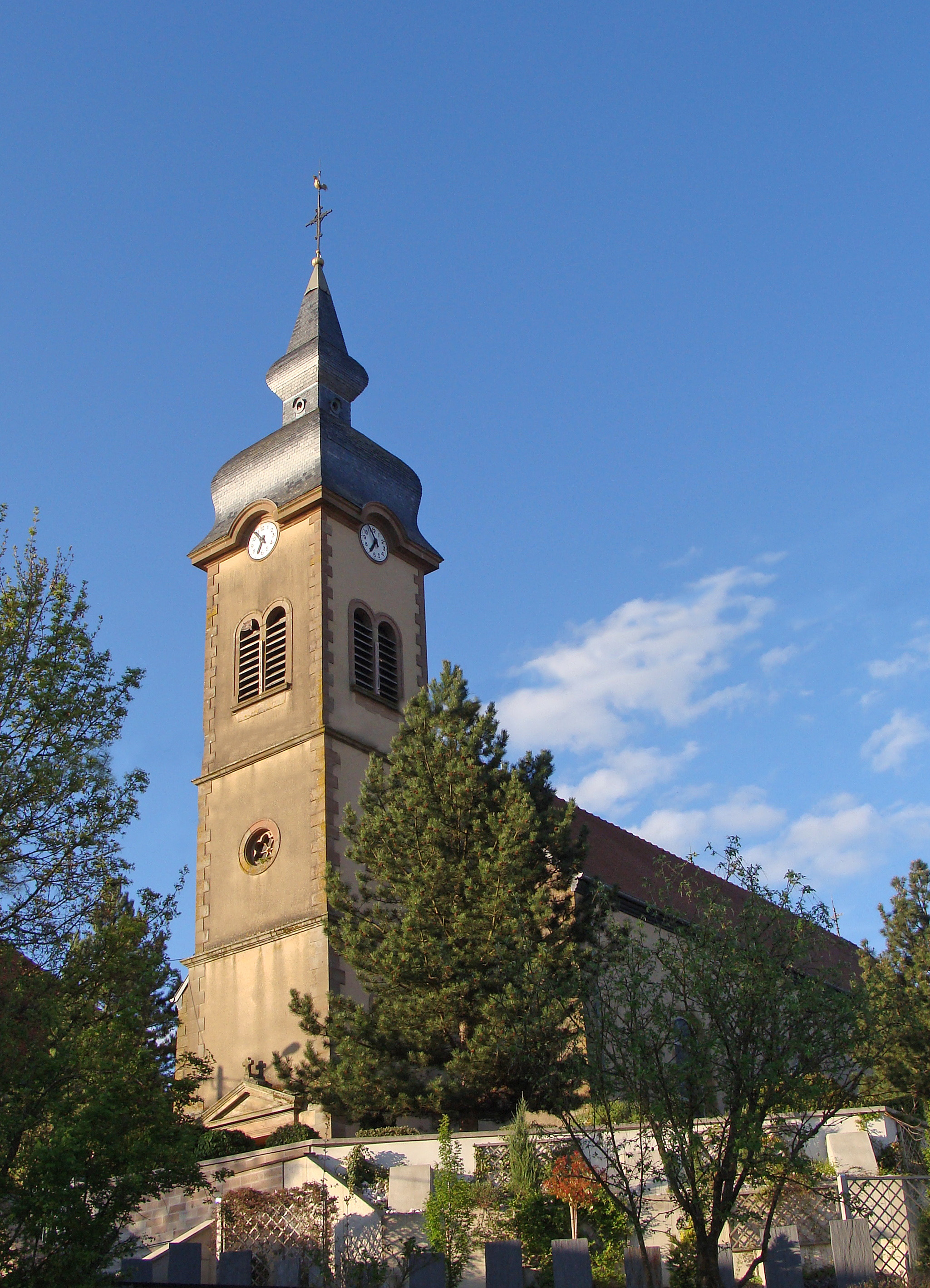
- The church in Hilsprich

- Coat of arms
- Location of Hilsprich
- Location within France Location within Grand Est
- Coordinates: 49°00′50″N 6°54′48″E
- Country: France
- Region: Grand Est
- Department: Moselle
- Arrondissement: Sarreguemines
- Canton: Sarralbe
- Intercommunality: CA Sarreguemines Confluences

Government
  - Mayor (2020–2026): Armand Gillet
- Area^{1}: 10.34 km^{2} (3.99 sq mi)
- Elevation: 235 m (771 ft)
- Highest elevation: 253 m (830 ft)
- Lowest elevation: 215 m (705 ft)
- Population (2023): 847
  - Density: 81.9/km^{2} (212/sq mi)
- Time zone: UTC+01:00 (CET)
  - Summer (DST): UTC+02:00 (CEST)
- INSEE/Postal code: 57325 /57510
- ^{1} French Land Register data, which excludes lakes, ponds, glaciers > 1 km^{2} (0.386 sq mi or 247 acres) and river estuaries.

Hilsprich (French pronunciation: [ilspʁiʃ]; German: Hilsprich) is a commune in the Moselle department in Grand Est in north-eastern France.

== See also ==
- Communes of the Moselle department
