= Willerwald =

- Commune
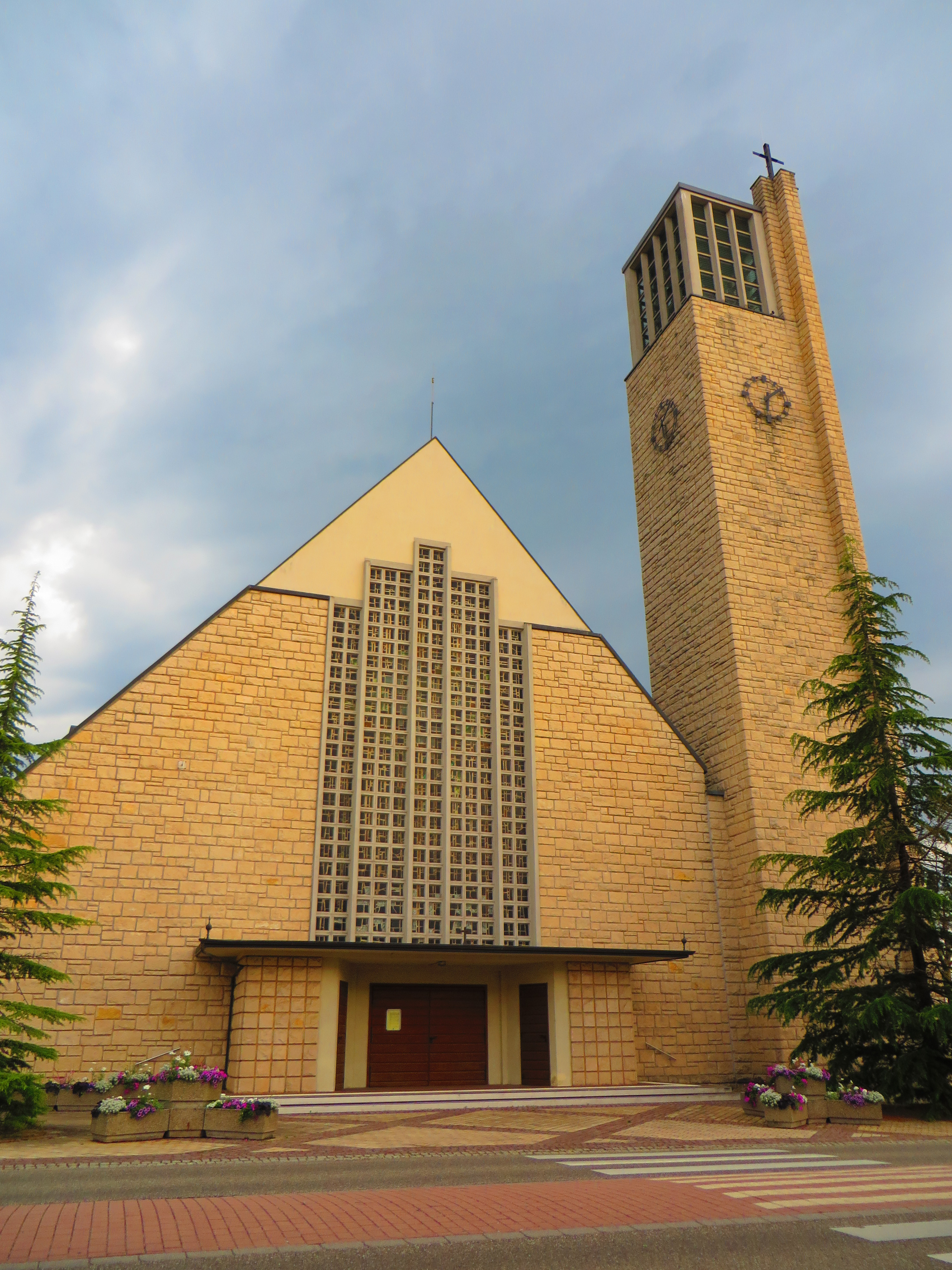
- The church in Willerwald

- Coat of arms
- Location of Willerwald
- Location within France Location within Grand Est
- Coordinates: 49°01′40″N 7°02′09″E
- Country: France
- Region: Grand Est
- Department: Moselle
- Arrondissement: Sarreguemines
- Canton: Sarreguemines
- Intercommunality: CA Sarreguemines Confluences

Government
  - Mayor (2020–2026): Henri Haxaire
- Area^{1}: 6.31 km^{2} (2.44 sq mi)
- Highest elevation: 265 m (869 ft)
- Lowest elevation: 206 m (676 ft)
- Population (2023): 1,517
  - Density: 240/km^{2} (623/sq mi)
- Time zone: UTC+01:00 (CET)
  - Summer (DST): UTC+02:00 (CEST)
- INSEE/Postal code: 57746 /57430
- ^{1} French Land Register data, which excludes lakes, ponds, glaciers > 1 km^{2} (0.386 sq mi or 247 acres) and river estuaries.

Willerwald (French pronunciation: [vilœʁvald]) is a commune in the Moselle department in Grand Est in north-eastern France.

== Geography ==
Willerwald is a town of about 1,500 inhabitants located 12 km south of Sarreguemines. The A4 motorway is 1 km from Willerwald. Located on a hill between Sarralbe and Hambach, the village developed along a north–south axis represented today by the RN 61. A dozen streets are perpendicular to this axis. This weft pattern weaves an original but widely dispersed urban morphology. In parallel to the RN 61 but bypassing the village, the railway line serving the Hambach Europole crosses the town.

Despite its name, the municipality does not have a forest. Three streams cross the town: the Hoppbach, the Waldscheingraben and the Dorrenbach. The town is also crossed by the channel of the Saar and Sarre coal mines.

== History ==
A first village named Weiler / Alberweiller or Albweiler was known as early as the 13th century. It was destroyed in the sixteenth century. Since 1601, a new village began to rise on the old ban cleared. In 1766 Willerwald passed with the Duchy of Lorraine under the sovereignty of France, and the Prince of Saarbrücken surrendered to France the property which he possessed at Willer.

A first church, dedicated to Saint Nicholas, was built in 1777. A new Gothic church, with a 60-meter belfry, was built between 1910 and 1911, and was solemnly consecrated on May 15, 1911. On June 6, 1940, the church was damaged when French artillery fired on it, believing that it was being used by the Germans as an observation post. In 1941, during the occupation, the remaining structure was demolished using explosives. The current church, also dedicated to Saint Nicholas, was built to replace it in 1955

During the Second World War, the population of the village was evacuated on September 1, 1939 to the department of Charente (first to Salles-d'Angles, then to Châteaubernard and Saint-Félix). The village was bombed on June 14, 1940 and occupied by German troops a day later. During the Lorraine campaign in late 1944 the village was bombed on December 4, which completely destroyed 47 houses and severely damaged the remaining buildings. It was liberated by the US Army the next day.

== Politics and administration ==
List of mayors
Name	Start of term	End of term
Emile Staub	?	?
Emile Tousch	?	?
René Staub	?	March 1995
Alfred Manns	March 1995	March 2008
Albert Masslo	March 2008	March 2020
Henri Haxaire	March 2020	Incumbent

== Population ==
Historical population

Year	Pop.	±% p.a.
1793	431	—
1821	634	+1.39%
1841	808	+1.22%
1861	659	−1.01%
1880	779	+0.88%
1900	818	+0.24%
1926	771	−0.23%
1946	805	+0.22%
1954	841	+0.55%
1962	935	+1.33%

Year	Pop.	±% p.a.
1968	934	−0.02%
1975	988	+0.81%
1982	1,132	+1.96%
1990	1,173	+0.45%
1999	1,225	+0.48%
2007	1,432	+1.97%
2012	1,519	+1.19%
2017	1,544	+0.33%
2023	1,517	−0.29%

Source: EHESS and INSEE (1968-2023)

== See also ==
- Communes of the Moselle department
