= Hazembourg =

- Commune
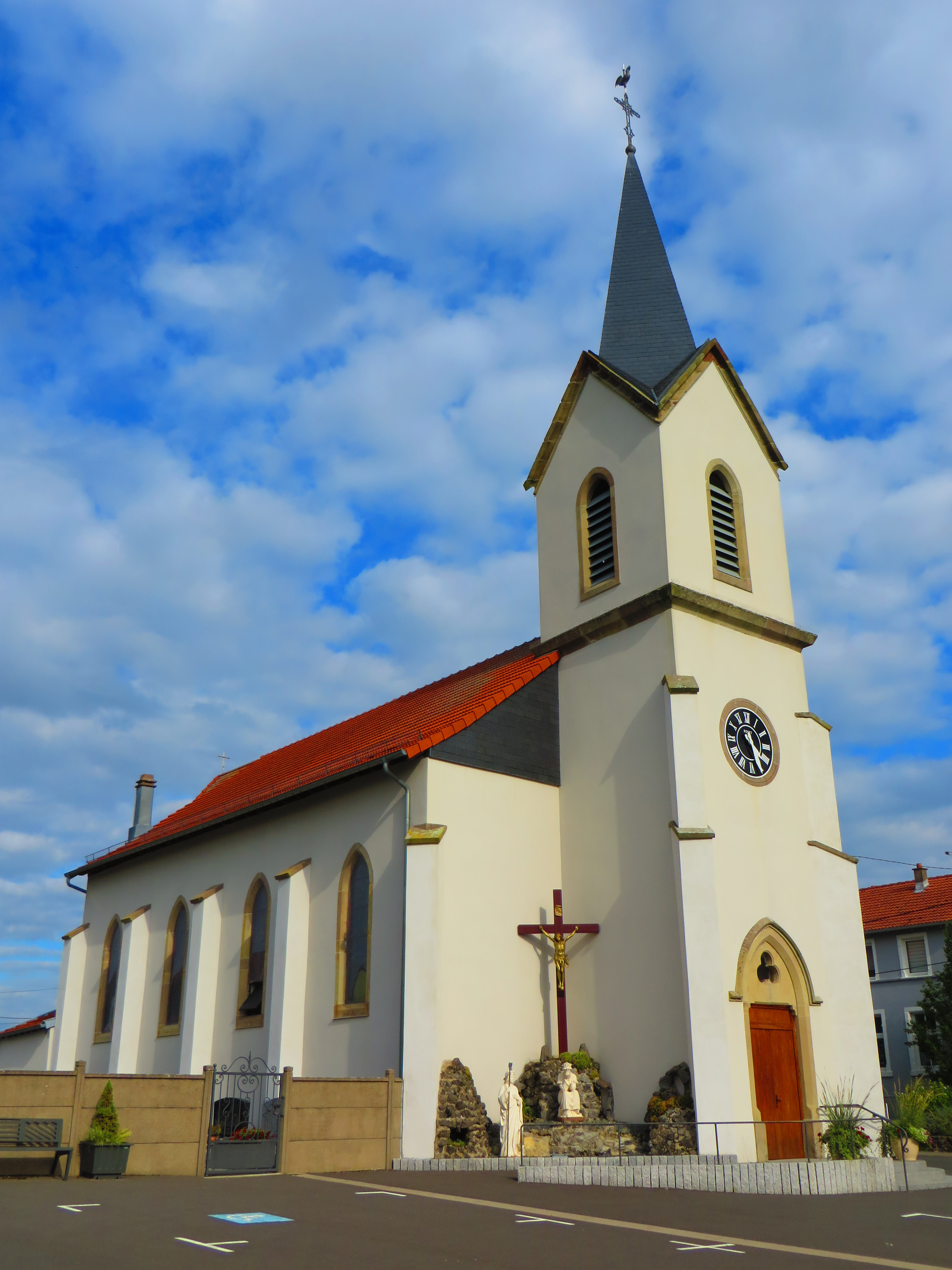
- The church in Hazembourg

- Coat of arms
- Location of Hazembourg
- Location within France Location within Grand Est
- Coordinates: 48°58′04″N 6°56′01″E
- Country: France
- Region: Grand Est
- Department: Moselle
- Arrondissement: Sarreguemines
- Canton: Sarralbe
- Intercommunality: CA Sarreguemines Confluences

Government
  - Mayor (2020–2026): Jean-Pierre Muller
- Area^{1}: 1.72 km^{2} (0.66 sq mi)
- Elevation: 225 m (738 ft)
- Highest elevation: 246 m (807 ft)
- Lowest elevation: 213 m (699 ft)
- Population (2023): 152
  - Density: 88.4/km^{2} (229/sq mi)
- Time zone: UTC+01:00 (CET)
  - Summer (DST): UTC+02:00 (CEST)
- INSEE/Postal code: 57308 /57430
- ^{1} French Land Register data, which excludes lakes, ponds, glaciers > 1 km^{2} (0.386 sq mi or 247 acres) and river estuaries.

Hazembourg (French pronunciation: [azɑ̃buʁ]; German: Hassenburg) is a commune in the Moselle department in Grand Est in north-eastern France.

== See also ==
- Communes of the Moselle department
