= Kirviller =

- Commune
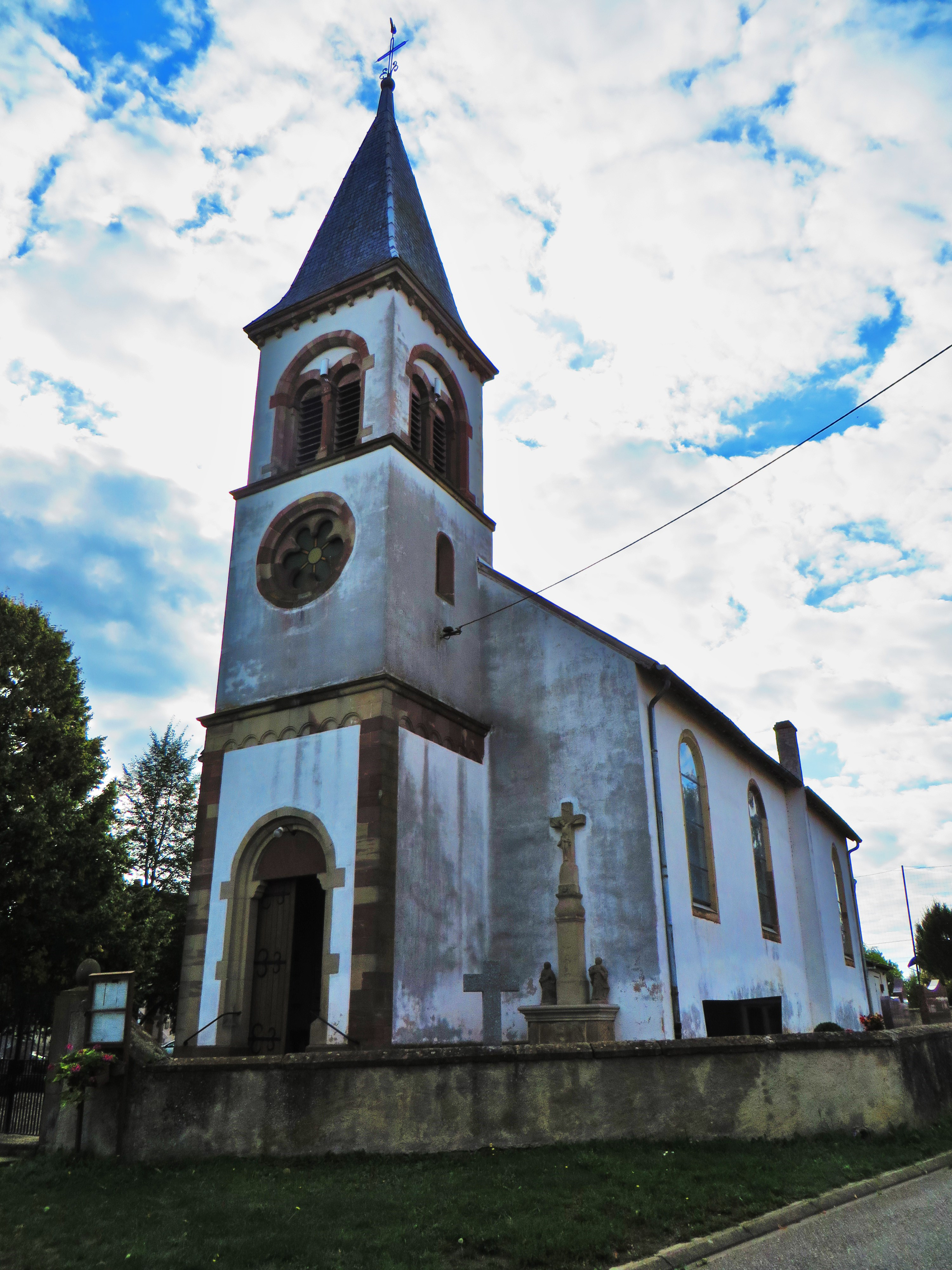
- The church in Kirviller

- Coat of arms
- Location of Kirviller
- Location within France Location within Grand Est
- Coordinates: 48°57′12″N 6°59′04″E
- Country: France
- Region: Grand Est
- Department: Moselle
- Arrondissement: Sarreguemines
- Canton: Sarralbe
- Intercommunality: CA Sarreguemines Confluences

Government
  - Mayor (2020–2026): Ludovic Estreich
- Area^{1}: 2.54 km^{2} (0.98 sq mi)
- Elevation: 220 m (720 ft)
- Highest elevation: 246 m (807 ft)
- Lowest elevation: 213 m (699 ft)
- Population (2023): 142
  - Density: 55.9/km^{2} (145/sq mi)
- Time zone: UTC+01:00 (CET)
  - Summer (DST): UTC+02:00 (CEST)
- INSEE/Postal code: 57366 /57430
- ^{1} French Land Register data, which excludes lakes, ponds, glaciers > 1 km^{2} (0.386 sq mi or 247 acres) and river estuaries.

Kirviller (French pronunciation: [kiʁvilɛʁ]; German: Kirweiler) is a commune in the Moselle department in Grand Est in north-eastern France.

== See also ==
- Communes of the Moselle department
