= Canton of Sarreguemines =

Coordinates: 49.05°N 7.43°E

Sarreguemines
- Canton
- Interactive map of Sarreguemines
- Country: France
- Region: Grand Est
- Department: Moselle
- No. of communes: {{{nbcomm}}}

Government
  - Representatives (2021–2028): Jean-Claude Cunat; Évelyne Firtion
- Area: 169.67 km^{2} (65.51 sq mi)
- Population (2023): 43,356
  - Density: 255.53/km^{2} (661.82/sq mi)
- INSEE code: 57 22

The canton of Sarreguemines is a canton of France, located in the Moselle department and the Grand Est region. Since the French canton reorganisation which came into effect in March 2015, the communes of the canton of Sarreguemines are:

1. Bliesbruck
2. Blies-Ébersing
3. Blies-Guersviller
4. Frauenberg
5. Grosbliederstroff
6. Hambach
7. Hundling
8. Ippling
9. Kalhausen
10. Lixing-lès-Rouhling
11. Neufgrange
12. Rémelfing
13. Rouhling
14. Sarreguemines
15. Sarreinsming
16. Wiesviller
17. Willerwald
18. Wittring
19. Wœlfling-lès-Sarreguemines
20. Zetting

== See also ==
- Cantons of the Moselle department
- Communes of the Moselle department
