= Rémelfing =

- Commune
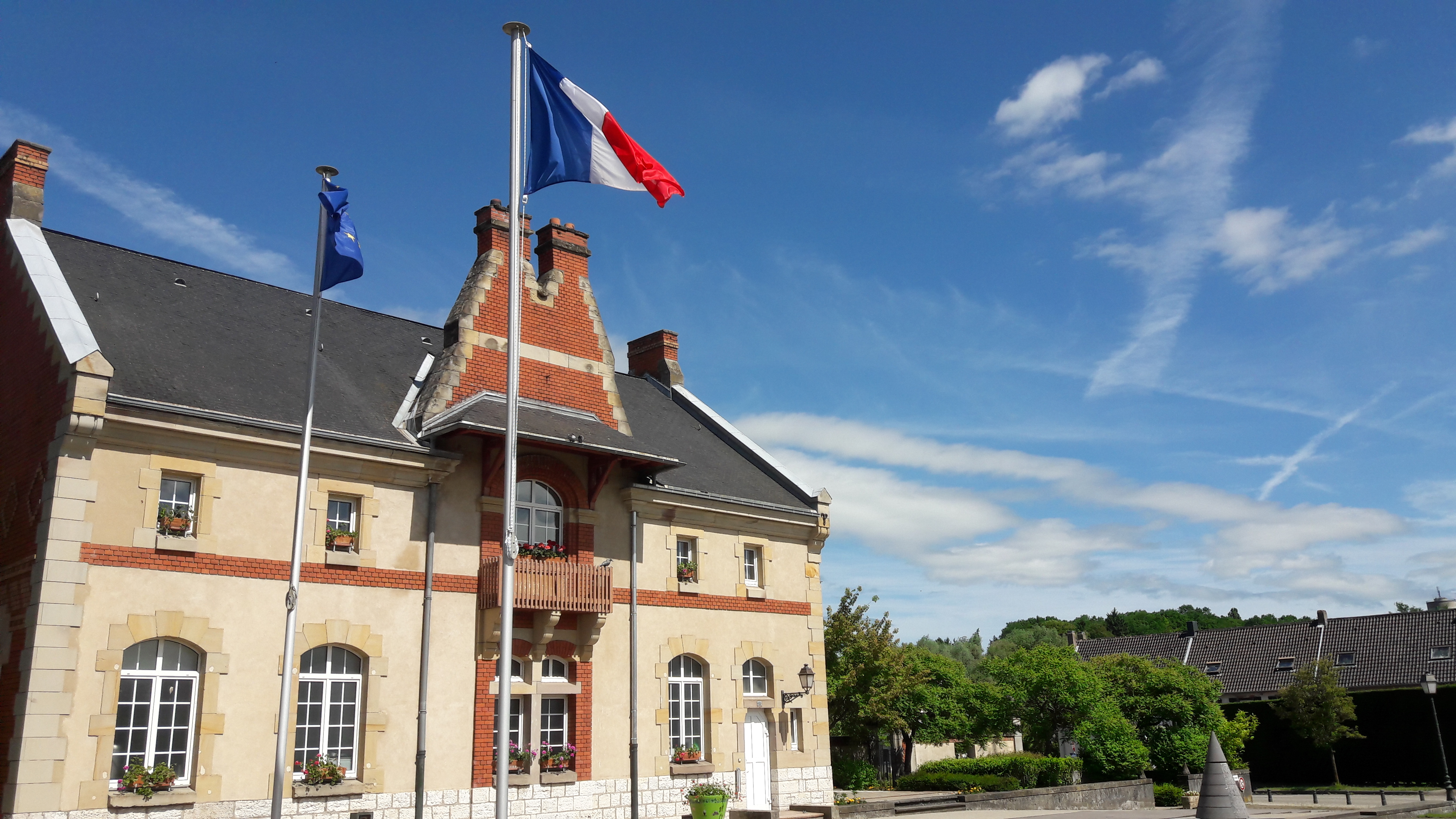
- The chateau and town hall in Rémelfing

- Coat of arms
- Location of Rémelfing
- Location within France Location within Grand Est
- Coordinates: 49°05′31″N 7°05′34″E
- Country: France
- Region: Grand Est
- Department: Moselle
- Arrondissement: Sarreguemines
- Canton: Sarreguemines
- Intercommunality: CA Sarreguemines Confluences

Government
  - Mayor (2020–2026): Hubert Bouring
- Area^{1}: 2.62 km^{2} (1.01 sq mi)
- Highest elevation: 263 m (863 ft)
- Lowest elevation: 195 m (640 ft)
- Population (2023): 1,305
  - Density: 498/km^{2} (1,290/sq mi)
- Time zone: UTC+01:00 (CET)
  - Summer (DST): UTC+02:00 (CEST)
- INSEE/Postal code: 57568 /57200
- ^{1} French Land Register data, which excludes lakes, ponds, glaciers > 1 km^{2} (0.386 sq mi or 247 acres) and river estuaries.

Rémelfing (French pronunciation: [ʁemɛlfɛ̃]; German: Remelfingen) is a commune in the Moselle department in Grand Est in north-eastern France.

== See also ==
- Communes of the Moselle department
