= Wittring =

- Commune
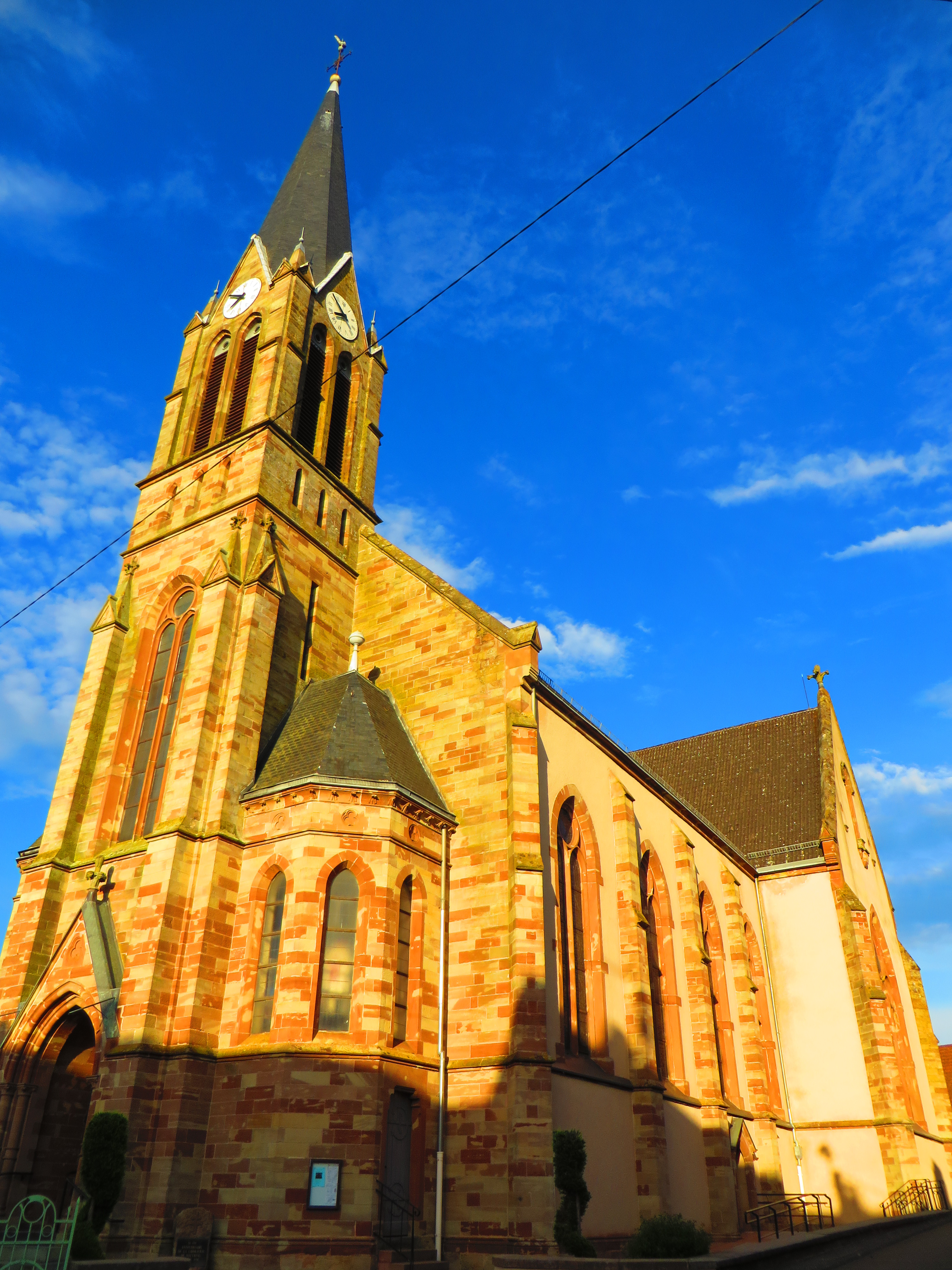
- The church in Wittring

- Coat of arms
- Location of Wittring
- Location within France Location within Grand Est
- Coordinates: 49°03′19″N 7°08′48″E
- Country: France
- Region: Grand Est
- Department: Moselle
- Arrondissement: Sarreguemines
- Canton: Sarreguemines
- Intercommunality: CA Sarreguemines Confluences

Government
  - Mayor (2023–2026): Bernard Rohr
- Area^{1}: 8.09 km^{2} (3.12 sq mi)
- Highest elevation: 336 m (1,102 ft)
- Lowest elevation: 199 m (653 ft)
- Population (2023): 736
  - Density: 91.0/km^{2} (236/sq mi)
- Time zone: UTC+01:00 (CET)
  - Summer (DST): UTC+02:00 (CEST)
- INSEE/Postal code: 57748 /57905
- ^{1} French Land Register data, which excludes lakes, ponds, glaciers > 1 km^{2} (0.386 sq mi or 247 acres) and river estuaries.

Wittring (French pronunciation: [vitʁɛ̃]; Lorraine Franconian: Wittringe) is a commune in the Moselle department in Grand Est in north-eastern France.

== Population ==
Historical population
Year	Pop.	±% p.a.
1968	874	—
1975	907	+0.53%
1982	844	−1.02%
1990	840	−0.06%
1999	821	−0.25%
2007	826	+0.08%
2012	818	−0.19%
2017	790	−0.69%
2023	736	−1.17%
Source: INSEE

== World War II V-2 facility ==
Following the August 1943 decision to move production of the German V-2 rocket underground, the biggest liquid oxygen factory with a planned total of 12 machines and a monthly capacity of 3600 tons was built in a tunnel system at Wittring, codenamed "Kalk" (chalk). At the time of the start of the rocket blitz in September 1944 five machines were operating. The site was captured by Allied troops in early December 1944.

== See also ==
- Communes of the Moselle department
