= Woustviller =

- Commune
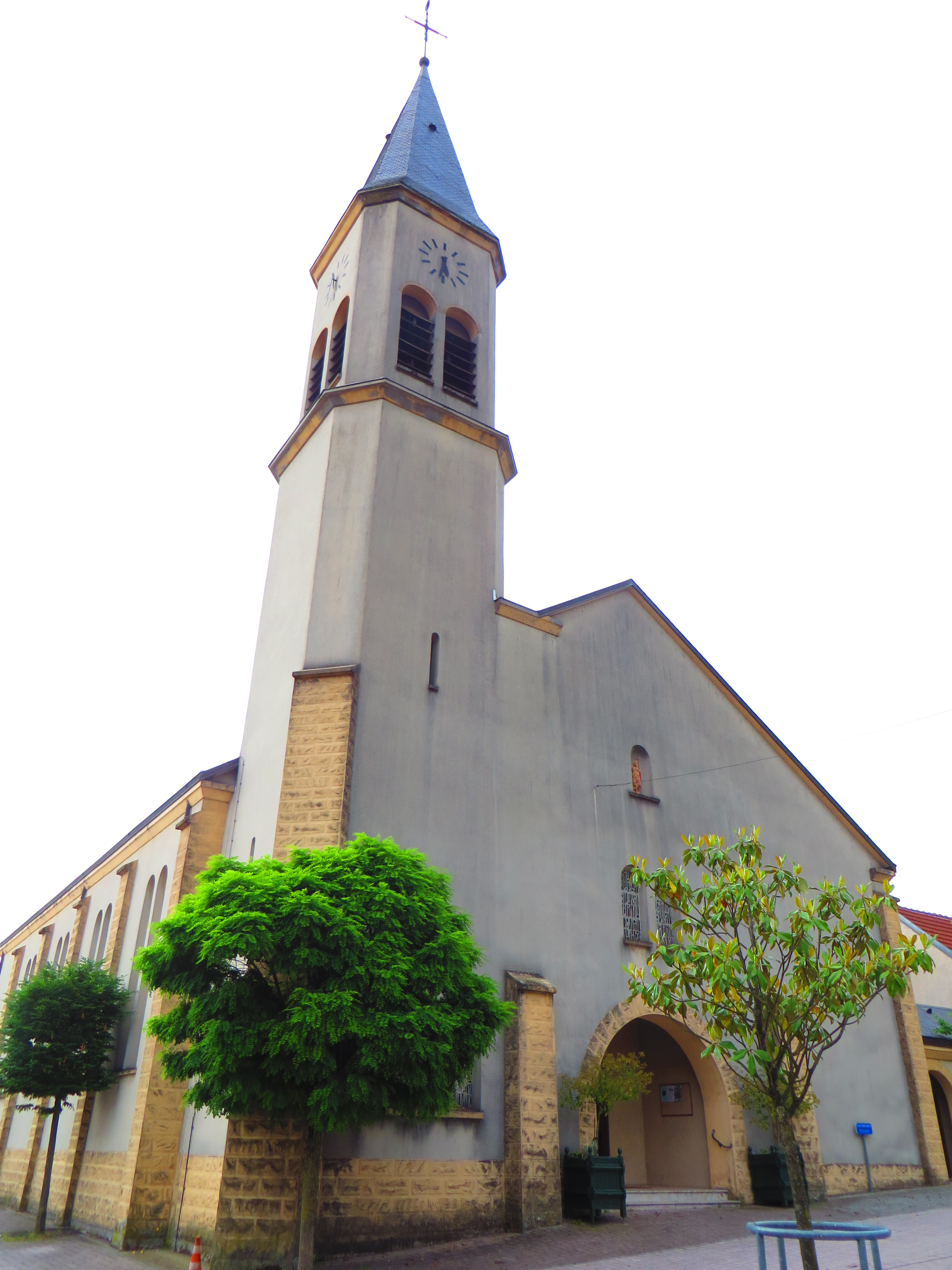
- The church in Woustviller

- Coat of arms
- Location of Woustviller
- Location within France Location within Grand Est
- Coordinates: 49°04′36″N 7°00′37″E
- Country: France
- Region: Grand Est
- Department: Moselle
- Arrondissement: Sarreguemines
- Canton: Sarralbe
- Intercommunality: CA Sarreguemines Confluences

Government
  - Mayor (2020–2026): Sonya Cristinelli-Fraiboeuf
- Area^{1}: 10.97 km^{2} (4.24 sq mi)
- Highest elevation: 275 m (902 ft)
- Lowest elevation: 209 m (686 ft)
- Population (2023): 2,786
  - Density: 254.0/km^{2} (657.8/sq mi)
- Time zone: UTC+01:00 (CET)
  - Summer (DST): UTC+02:00 (CEST)
- INSEE/Postal code: 57752 /57915
- ^{1} French Land Register data, which excludes lakes, ponds, glaciers > 1 km^{2} (0.386 sq mi or 247 acres) and river estuaries.

Woustviller (French pronunciation: [vustvilɛʁ]; German: Wustweiler) is a commune in the Moselle department in Grand Est in north-eastern France.

== Population ==
Historical population
Year	Pop.	±% p.a.
1968	736	—
1975	1,107	+6.00%
1982	1,970	+8.58%
1990	2,875	+4.84%
1999	3,311	+1.58%
2007	3,075	−0.92%
2012	3,252	+1.13%
2017	3,175	−0.48%
2023	2,786	−2.15%
Source: INSEE

== Twin towns ==
- Wustweiler (Germany), since 1996.

== See also ==
- Communes of the Moselle department
