= Blies-Guersviller =

- Commune
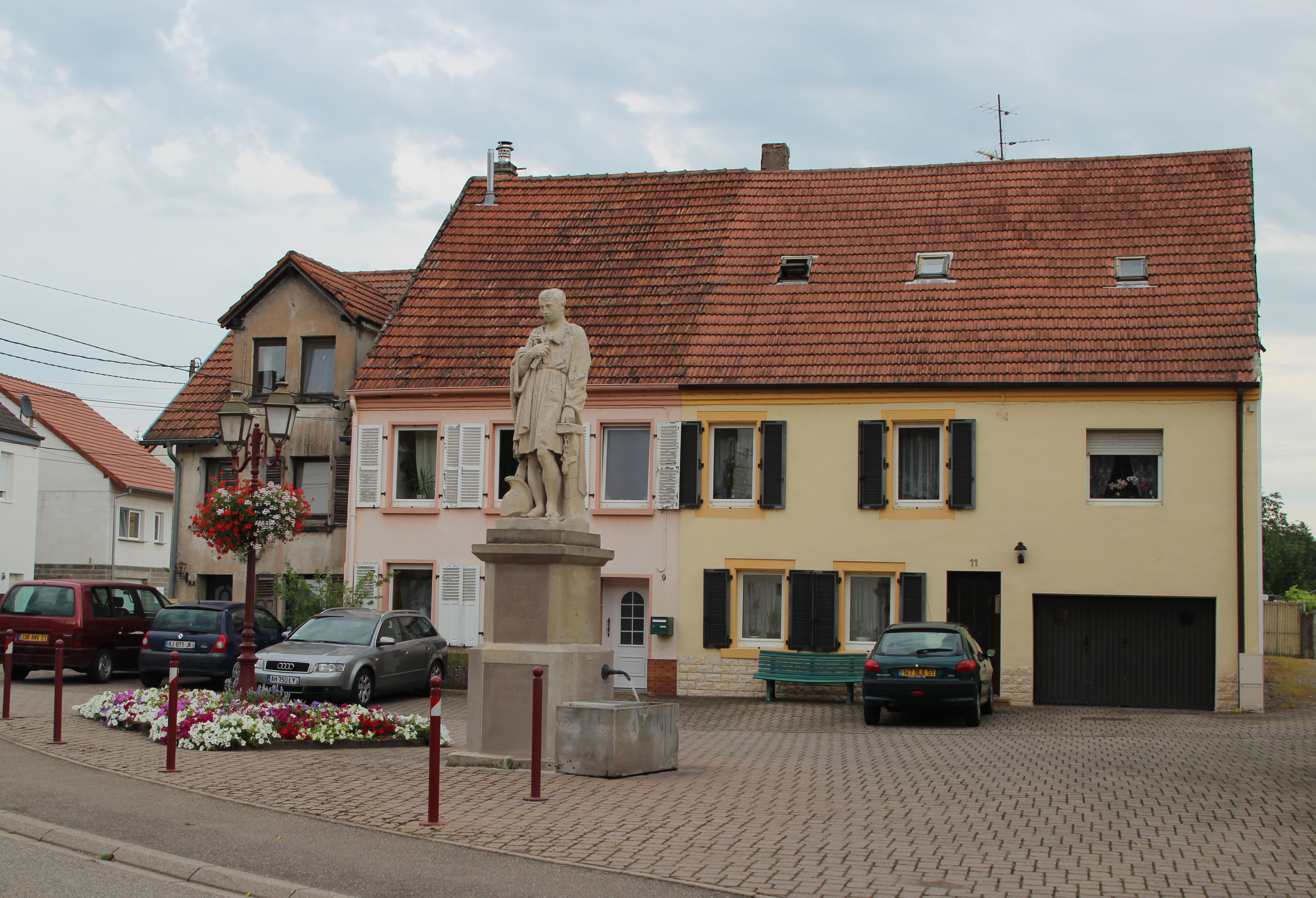
- A statue on the main road in Blies-Guersviller

- Coat of arms
- Location of Blies-Guersviller
- Location within France Location within Grand Est
- Coordinates: 49°08′56″N 7°05′01″E
- Country: France
- Region: Grand Est
- Department: Moselle
- Arrondissement: Sarreguemines
- Canton: Sarreguemines
- Intercommunality: CA Sarreguemines Confluences

Government
  - Mayor (2020–2026): Roland Roth (LR)
- Area^{1}: 3.6 km^{2} (1.4 sq mi)
- Highest elevation: 287 m (942 ft)
- Lowest elevation: 197 m (646 ft)
- Population (2023): 651
  - Density: 180/km^{2} (470/sq mi)
- Time zone: UTC+01:00 (CET)
  - Summer (DST): UTC+02:00 (CEST)
- INSEE/Postal code: 57093 /57200
- ^{1} French Land Register data, which excludes lakes, ponds, glaciers > 1 km^{2} (0.386 sq mi or 247 acres) and river estuaries.

Blies-Guersviller (French pronunciation: [bliz ɡɛʁsvilɛʁ]; German: Bliesgersweiler) is a commune in the Moselle department in Grand Est in northeastern France.

== Population ==
Historical population
Year	Pop.	±% p.a.
1968	373	—
1975	313	−2.47%
1982	542	+8.16%
1990	628	+1.86%
1999	661	+0.57%
2007	609	−1.02%
2012	610	+0.03%
2017	644	+1.09%
2023	651	+0.18%
Source: INSEE

== See also ==
- Communes of the Moselle department
