= Guebenhouse =

- Commune
- Coat of arms
- Location of Guebenhouse
- Location within France Location within Grand Est
- Coordinates: 49°04′32″N 6°56′36″E
- Country: France
- Region: Grand Est
- Department: Moselle
- Arrondissement: Sarreguemines
- Canton: Sarralbe
- Intercommunality: CA Sarreguemines Confluences

Government
  - Mayor (2020–2026): Hervé Ruff
- Area^{1}: 4.46 km^{2} (1.72 sq mi)
- Highest elevation: 288 m (945 ft)
- Lowest elevation: 219 m (719 ft)
- Population (2023): 417
  - Density: 93.5/km^{2} (242/sq mi)
- Time zone: UTC+01:00 (CET)
  - Summer (DST): UTC+02:00 (CEST)
- INSEE/Postal code: 57264 /57510
- ^{1} French Land Register data, which excludes lakes, ponds, glaciers > 1 km^{2} (0.386 sq mi or 247 acres) and river estuaries.

Guebenhouse (French pronunciation: [ɡebənuz]; German: Gebenhausen) is a commune in the Moselle department in Grand Est in north-eastern France.

== See also ==
- Communes of the Moselle department
