= Loupershouse =

- Commune
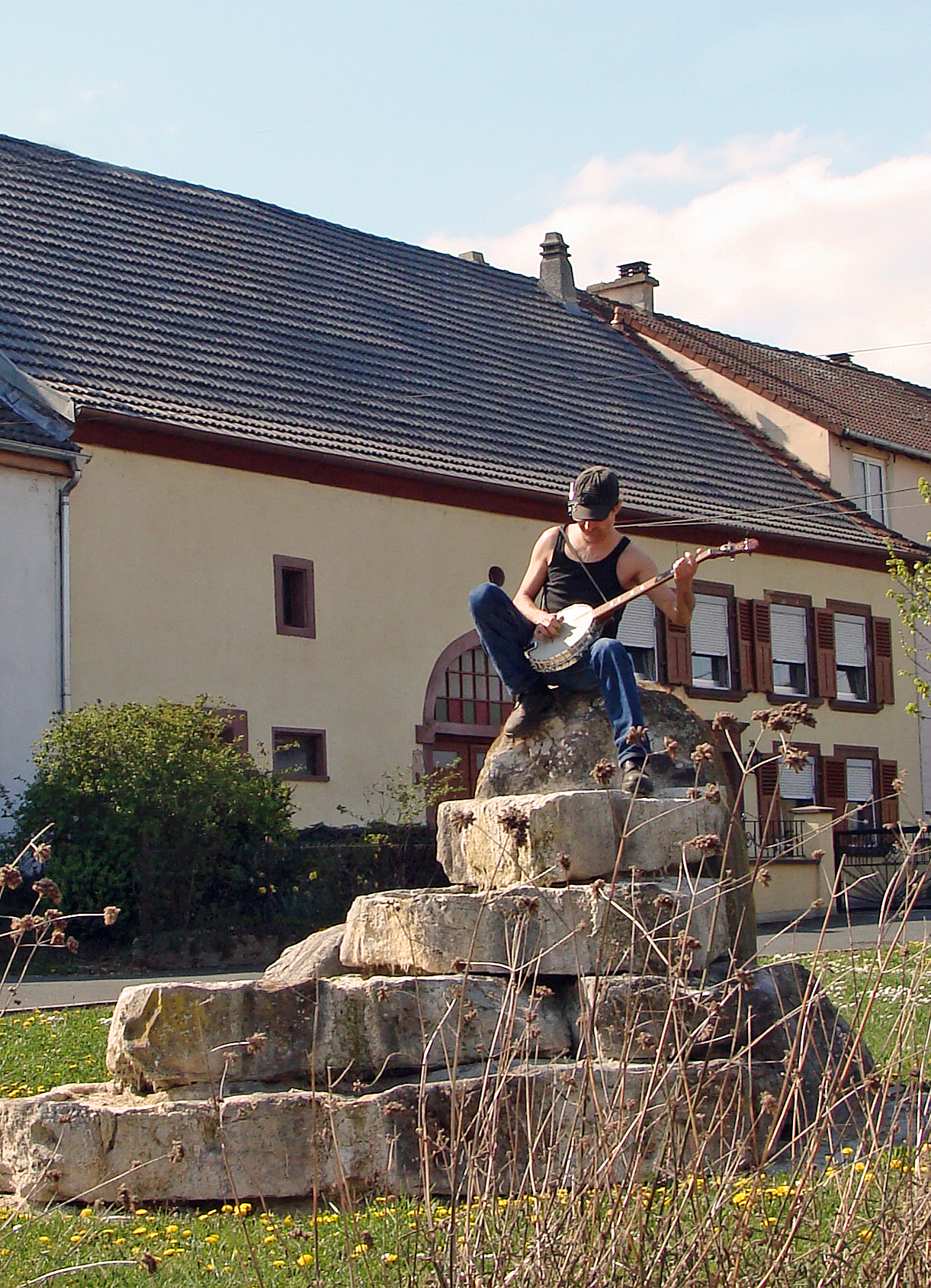
- A banjo player in Ellviller

- Coat of arms
- Location of Loupershouse
- Location within France Location within Grand Est
- Coordinates: 49°04′54″N 6°54′51″E
- Country: France
- Region: Grand Est
- Department: Moselle
- Arrondissement: Sarreguemines
- Canton: Sarralbe
- Intercommunality: CA Sarreguemines Confluences

Government
  - Mayor (2020–2026): Jean-Claude Kratz
- Area^{1}: 7.73 km^{2} (2.98 sq mi)
- Highest elevation: 291 m (955 ft)
- Lowest elevation: 225 m (738 ft)
- Population (2023): 904
  - Density: 117/km^{2} (303/sq mi)
- Time zone: UTC+01:00 (CET)
  - Summer (DST): UTC+02:00 (CEST)
- INSEE/Postal code: 57419 /57510
- ^{1} French Land Register data, which excludes lakes, ponds, glaciers > 1 km^{2} (0.386 sq mi or 247 acres) and river estuaries.

Loupershouse (French pronunciation: [lupɛʁʃuz]; German: Lupershausen) is a commune in the Moselle department in Grand Est in north-eastern France.

== See also ==
- Communes of the Moselle department
