= Grundviller =

- Commune
- Coat of arms
- Location of Grundviller
- Location within France Location within Grand Est
- Coordinates: 49°02′40″N 6°58′18″E
- Country: France
- Region: Grand Est
- Department: Moselle
- Arrondissement: Sarreguemines
- Canton: Sarralbe
- Intercommunality: CA Sarreguemines Confluences

Government
  - Mayor (2020–2026): Jacques Sendras
- Area^{1}: 6.27 km^{2} (2.42 sq mi)
- Highest elevation: 272 m (892 ft)
- Lowest elevation: 222 m (728 ft)
- Population (2023): 674
  - Density: 107/km^{2} (278/sq mi)
- Time zone: UTC+01:00 (CET)
  - Summer (DST): UTC+02:00 (CEST)
- INSEE/Postal code: 57263 /57510
- ^{1} French Land Register data, which excludes lakes, ponds, glaciers > 1 km^{2} (0.386 sq mi or 247 acres) and river estuaries.

Grundviller (French pronunciation: [ɡʁundvilɛʁ] or [ɡʁyndvilɛʁ]; German: Grundweiler; Lorraine Franconian: Grendwiller) is a commune in the Moselle department in Grand Est in north-eastern France.

== See also ==
- Communes of the Moselle department
