= Frauenberg, Moselle =

Frauenberg
- Commune
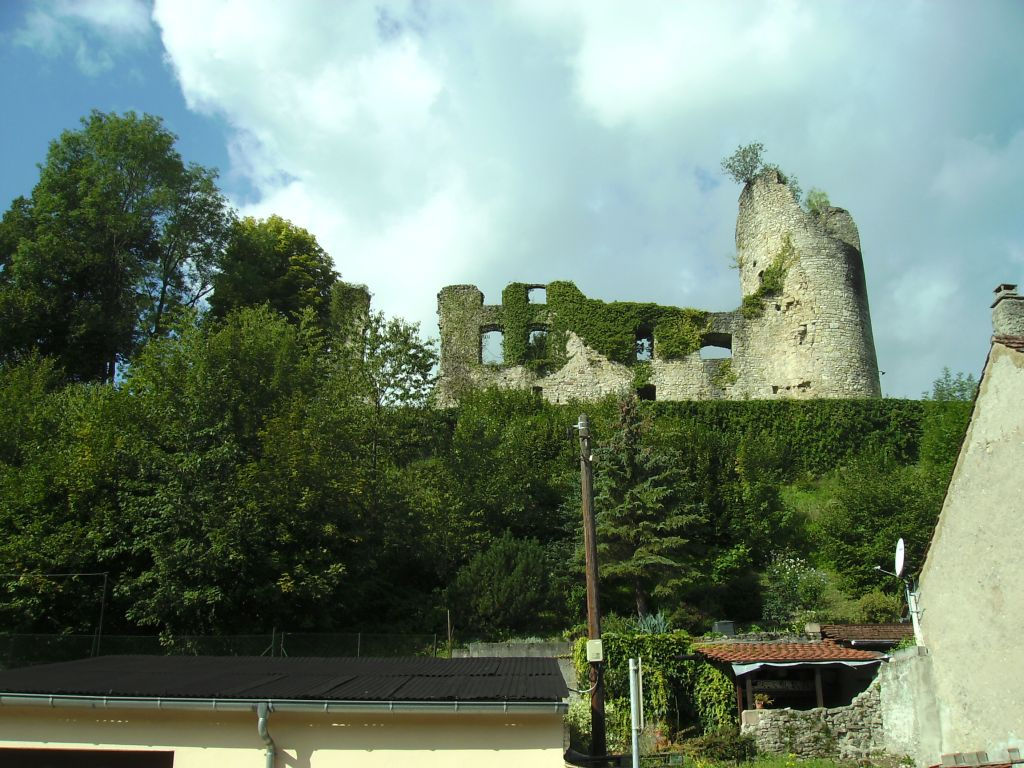
- The ruins in Frauenberg

- Coat of arms
- Location of Frauenberg
- Location within France Location within Grand Est
- Coordinates: 49°08′15″N 7°07′41″E
- Country: France
- Region: Grand Est
- Department: Moselle
- Arrondissement: Sarreguemines
- Canton: Sarreguemines
- Intercommunality: CA Sarreguemines Confluences

Government
  - Mayor (2020–2026): Lucien Dorschner
- Area^{1}: 2.75 km^{2} (1.06 sq mi)
- Highest elevation: 276 m (906 ft)
- Lowest elevation: 198 m (650 ft)
- Population (2023): 603
  - Density: 219/km^{2} (568/sq mi)
- Time zone: UTC+01:00 (CET)
  - Summer (DST): UTC+02:00 (CEST)
- INSEE/Postal code: 57234 /57200
- ^{1} French Land Register data, which excludes lakes, ponds, glaciers > 1 km^{2} (0.386 sq mi or 247 acres) and river estuaries.

Frauenberg (French pronunciation: [fʁauənbɛʁɡ]; German: Frauenberg) is a commune in the Moselle department in Grand Est in north-eastern France.

== See also ==
- Communes of the Moselle department
