= Blies-Ébersing =

- Commune
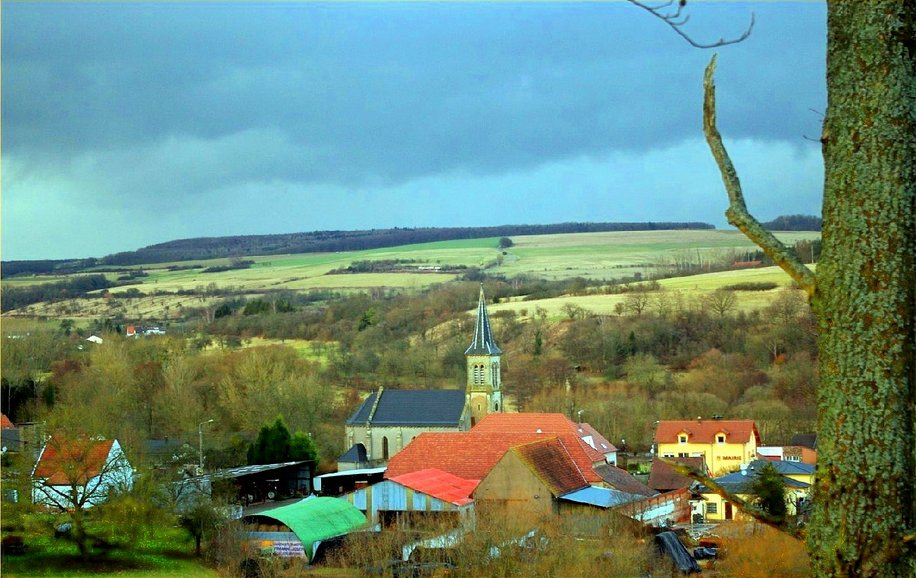
- A general view of Blies-Ébersing

- Coat of arms
- Location of Blies-Ébersing
- Location within France Location within Grand Est
- Coordinates: 49°07′30″N 7°08′45″E
- Country: France
- Region: Grand Est
- Department: Moselle
- Arrondissement: Sarreguemines
- Canton: Sarreguemines
- Intercommunality: CA Sarreguemines Confluences

Government
  - Mayor (2020–2026): Pascal Tarillon
- Area^{1}: 5.24 km^{2} (2.02 sq mi)
- Highest elevation: 326 m (1,070 ft)
- Lowest elevation: 201 m (659 ft)
- Population (2023): 617
  - Density: 118/km^{2} (305/sq mi)
- Time zone: UTC+01:00 (CET)
  - Summer (DST): UTC+02:00 (CEST)
- INSEE/Postal code: 57092 /57200
- ^{1} French Land Register data, which excludes lakes, ponds, glaciers > 1 km^{2} (0.386 sq mi or 247 acres) and river estuaries.

Blies-Ébersing (French pronunciation: [bliz ebɛʁsɛ̃]; German: Bliesebersingen) is a commune in the Moselle department in Grand Est in northeastern France.

== Population ==
Historical population
| Year | Pop. | ±% p.a. |
|---|---|---|
| 1968 | 369 | — |
| 1975 | 423 | +1.97% |
| 1982 | 457 | +1.11% |
| 1990 | 479 | +0.59% |
| 1999 | 529 | +1.11% |
| 2007 | 568 | +0.89% |
| 2012 | 620 | +1.77% |
| 2017 | 646 | +0.82% |
| 2023 | 617 | −0.76% |
Source: INSEE

== See also ==
- Communes of the Moselle department
