= Ippling =

- Commune
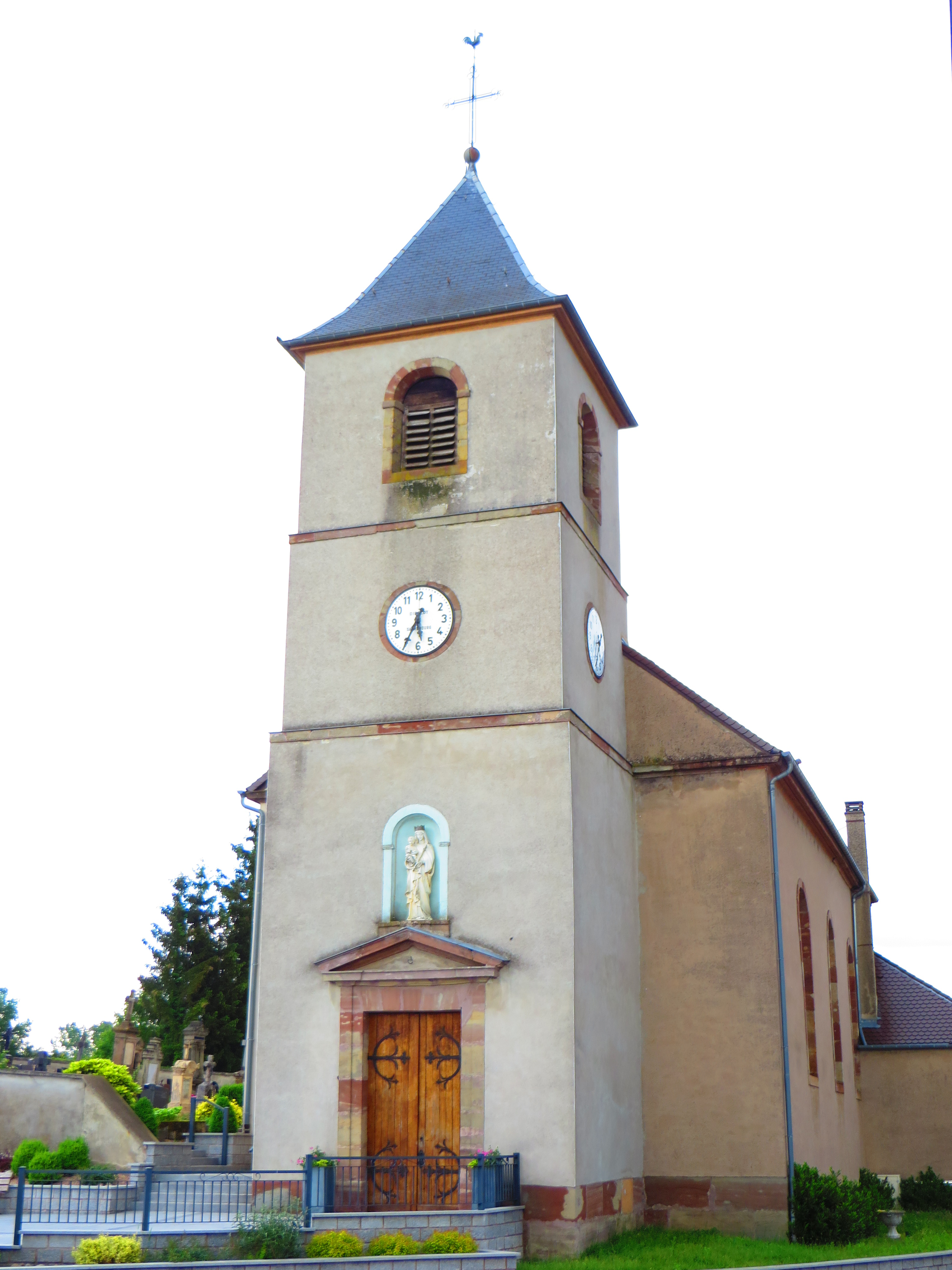
- The church in Ippling

- Coat of arms
- Location of Ippling
- Location within France Location within Grand Est
- Coordinates: 49°06′25″N 7°00′18″E
- Country: France
- Region: Grand Est
- Department: Moselle
- Arrondissement: Sarreguemines
- Canton: Sarreguemines
- Intercommunality: CA Sarreguemines Confluences

Government
  - Mayor (2020–2026): Philippe Legato
- Area^{1}: 3.29 km^{2} (1.27 sq mi)
- Highest elevation: 298 m (978 ft)
- Lowest elevation: 208 m (682 ft)
- Population (2023): 787
  - Density: 239/km^{2} (620/sq mi)
- Time zone: UTC+01:00 (CET)
  - Summer (DST): UTC+02:00 (CEST)
- INSEE/Postal code: 57348 /57990
- ^{1} French Land Register data, which excludes lakes, ponds, glaciers > 1 km^{2} (0.386 sq mi or 247 acres) and river estuaries.

Ippling (French pronunciation: [iplɛ̃]; German: Iplingen; Lorraine Franconian: Iblinge) is a commune in the Moselle department in Grand Est in north-eastern France.

== See also ==
- Communes of the Moselle department
