= Wiesviller =

- Commune
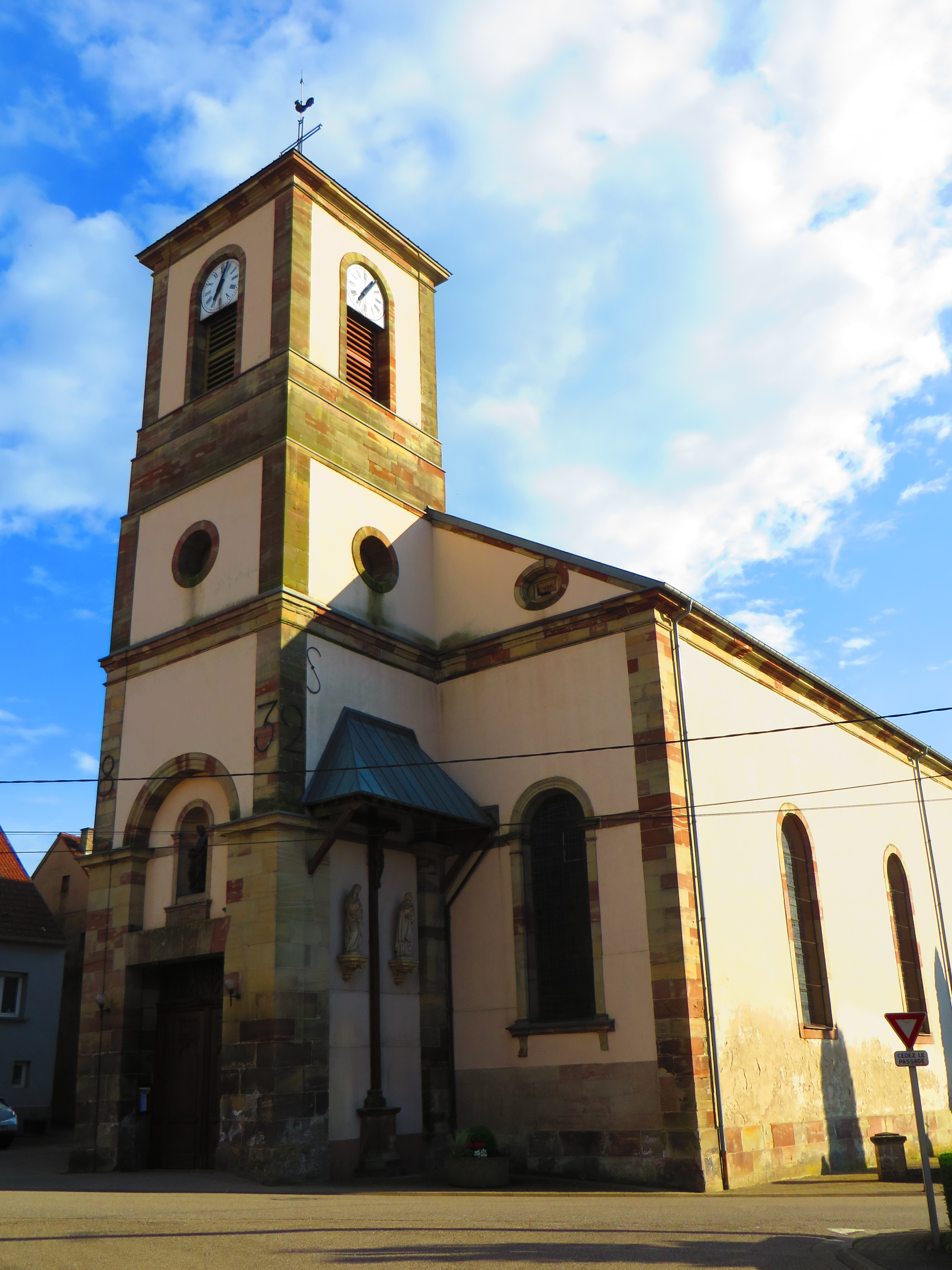
- The church in Wiesviller

- Coat of arms
- Location of Wiesviller
- Location within France Location within Grand Est
- Coordinates: 49°04′52″N 7°09′56″E
- Country: France
- Region: Grand Est
- Department: Moselle
- Arrondissement: Sarreguemines
- Canton: Sarreguemines
- Intercommunality: CA Sarreguemines Confluences

Government
  - Mayor (2020–2026): Franck Philippi
- Area^{1}: 8.83 km^{2} (3.41 sq mi)
- Highest elevation: 342 m (1,122 ft)
- Lowest elevation: 225 m (738 ft)
- Population (2023): 914
  - Density: 104/km^{2} (268/sq mi)
- Time zone: UTC+01:00 (CET)
  - Summer (DST): UTC+02:00 (CEST)
- INSEE/Postal code: 57745 /57200
- ^{1} French Land Register data, which excludes lakes, ponds, glaciers > 1 km^{2} (0.386 sq mi or 247 acres) and river estuaries.

Wiesviller (French pronunciation: [visvilɛʁ]; German: Wiesweiler) is a commune in the Moselle department in Grand Est in north-eastern France.

== Population ==
Historical population
Year	Pop.	±% p.a.
1968	796	—
1975	783	−0.23%
1982	829	+0.82%
1990	920	+1.31%
1999	959	+0.46%
2007	1,033	+0.93%
2012	1,012	−0.41%
2017	968	−0.89%
2023	914	−0.95%
Source: INSEE

== See also ==
- Communes of the Moselle department
