= Neufgrange =

- Commune
- Coat of arms
- Location of Neufgrange
- Location within France Location within Grand Est
- Coordinates: 49°04′39″N 7°04′07″E
- Country: France
- Region: Grand Est
- Department: Moselle
- Arrondissement: Sarreguemines
- Canton: Sarreguemines
- Intercommunality: CA Sarreguemines Confluences

Government
  - Mayor (2020–2026): Sandrine Momper
- Area^{1}: 7.17 km^{2} (2.77 sq mi)
- Highest elevation: 278 m (912 ft)
- Lowest elevation: 214 m (702 ft)
- Population (2023): 1,364
  - Density: 190/km^{2} (493/sq mi)
- Time zone: UTC+01:00 (CET)
  - Summer (DST): UTC+02:00 (CEST)
- INSEE/Postal code: 57499 /57910
- ^{1} French Land Register data, which excludes lakes, ponds, glaciers > 1 km^{2} (0.386 sq mi or 247 acres) and river estuaries.

Neufgrange (French pronunciation: [nœfɡʁɑ̃ʒ]; German: Neuscheuern) is a commune in the Moselle department in Grand Est in north-eastern France.

== See also ==
- Communes of the Moselle department
