= Puttelange-aux-Lacs =

- Commune
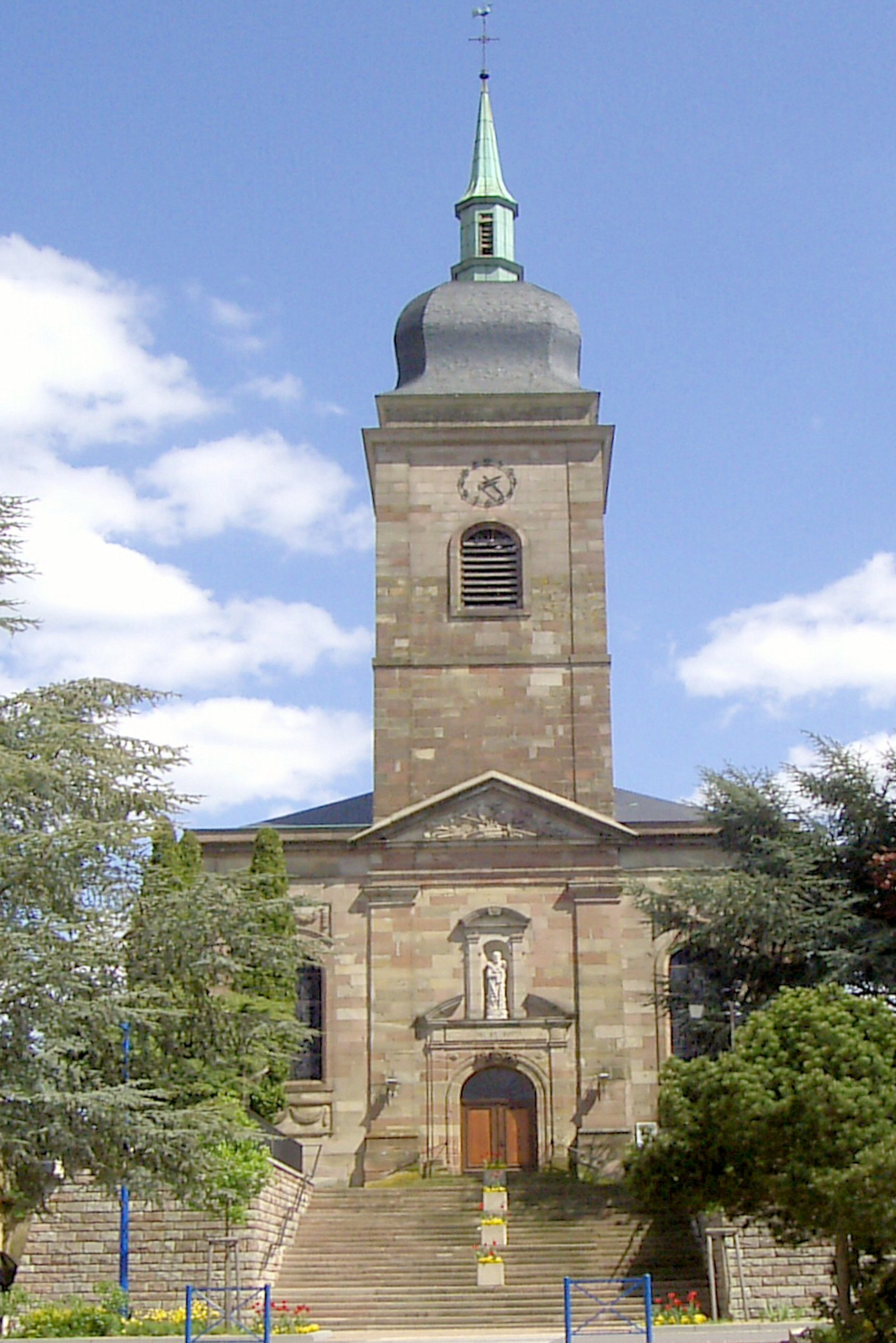
- The church in Puttelange-aux-Lacs

- Coat of arms
- Location of Puttelange-aux-Lacs
- Location within France Location within Grand Est
- Coordinates: 49°03′11″N 6°55′54″E
- Country: France
- Region: Grand Est
- Department: Moselle
- Arrondissement: Sarreguemines
- Canton: Sarralbe
- Intercommunality: CA Sarreguemines Confluences

Government
  - Mayor (2020–2026): Claude Decker
- Area^{1}: 16.66 km^{2} (6.43 sq mi)
- Elevation: 240 m (790 ft)
- Highest elevation: 277 m (909 ft)
- Lowest elevation: 220 m (720 ft)
- Population (2023): 3,016
  - Density: 181.0/km^{2} (468.9/sq mi)
- Time zone: UTC+01:00 (CET)
  - Summer (DST): UTC+02:00 (CEST)
- INSEE/Postal code: 57556 /57510
- ^{1} French Land Register data, which excludes lakes, ponds, glaciers > 1 km^{2} (0.386 sq mi or 247 acres) and river estuaries.

Puttelange-aux-Lacs (French pronunciation: [pytlɑ̃ʒ o lak]; German: Püttlingen) is a commune in the Moselle department in Grand Est in north-eastern France.

The village is situated on the N56 road.

== Population ==
Historical population
Year	Pop.	±% p.a.
1968	2,642	—
1975	2,802	+0.84%
1982	3,016	+1.06%
1990	2,979	−0.15%
1999	3,101	+0.45%
2007	3,185	+0.33%
2012	3,113	−0.46%
2017	3,025	−0.57%
2023	3,016	−0.05%
Source: INSEE

== See also ==
- Communes of the Moselle department
