= Wœlfling-lès-Sarreguemines =

- Commune
- Coat of arms
- Location of Wœlfling-lès-Sarreguemines
- Location within France Location within Grand Est
- Coordinates: 49°05′10″N 7°10′29″E
- Country: France
- Region: Grand Est
- Department: Moselle
- Arrondissement: Sarreguemines
- Canton: Sarreguemines
- Intercommunality: CA Sarreguemines Confluences

Government
  - Mayor (2024–2026): Fabien Peifer
- Area^{1}: 6.24 km^{2} (2.41 sq mi)
- Highest elevation: 357 m (1,171 ft)
- Lowest elevation: 270 m (890 ft)
- Population (2023): 700
  - Density: 110/km^{2} (290/sq mi)
- Time zone: UTC+01:00 (CET)
  - Summer (DST): UTC+02:00 (CEST)
- INSEE/Postal code: 57750 /57200
- ^{1} French Land Register data, which excludes lakes, ponds, glaciers > 1 km^{2} (0.386 sq mi or 247 acres) and river estuaries.

Wœlfling-lès-Sarreguemines (French pronunciation: [vœlflɛ̃ lɛ saʁɡəmin], literally Wœlfling near Sarreguemines; German: Wölflingen bei Bliesbrücken) is a commune in the Moselle department in Grand Est in north-eastern France.

== Population ==
Historical population
Year	Pop.	±% p.a.
1968	488	—
1975	511	+0.66%
1982	557	+1.24%
1990	597	+0.87%
1999	577	−0.38%
2007	644	+1.38%
2012	722	+2.31%
2017	739	+0.47%
2023	700	−0.90%
Source: INSEE

== See also ==
- Communes of the Moselle department
