= Communauté d'agglomération Sarreguemines Confluences =

Sarreguemines Confluences
- Communauté d'agglomération
- Interactive map of Sarreguemines Confluences
- Coordinates: 49°05′N 07°05′E
- Country: France
- Region: Grand Est
- Department: Bas-Rhin, Moselle
- No. of communes: {{{nbcomm}}}
- Established: July 12, 1999
- Area: 340.5 km^{2} (131.5 sq mi)
- Population (2019): 64,271
  - Density: 188.8/km^{2} (488.9/sq mi)
- Website: www.agglo-sarreguemines.fr

Communauté d'agglomération Sarreguemines Confluences is the communauté d'agglomération, an intercommunal structure, centred on the town of Sarreguemines. It is located in the Moselle and Bas-Rhin departments, in the Grand Est region, northeastern France. Founded in 1999 and modified by the RCT law in 2010, its seat is in Sarreguemines. Its area is 340.5 km^{2}. Its population was 64,271 in 2019, of which 20,635 in Sarreguemines proper.

== Composition ==
The communauté d'agglomération consists of the following 38 communes, of which 1 (Siltzheim) in Bas-Rhin:

1. Bliesbruck
2. Blies-Ébersing
3. Blies-Guersviller
4. Ernestviller
5. Frauenberg
6. Grosbliederstroff
7. Grundviller
8. Guebenhouse
9. Hambach
10. Hazembourg
11. Hilsprich
12. Holving
13. Hundling
14. Ippling
15. Kalhausen
16. Kappelkinger
17. Kirviller
18. Lixing-lès-Rouhling
19. Loupershouse
20. Nelling
21. Neufgrange
22. Puttelange-aux-Lacs
23. Rémelfing
24. Rémering-lès-Puttelange
25. Richeling
26. Rouhling
27. Saint-Jean-Rohrbach
28. Sarralbe
29. Sarreguemines
30. Sarreinsming
31. Siltzheim
32. Le Val-de-Guéblange
33. Wiesviller
34. Willerwald
35. Wittring
36. Wœlfling-lès-Sarreguemines
37. Woustviller
38. Zetting
