= Lixing-lès-Rouhling =

- Commune
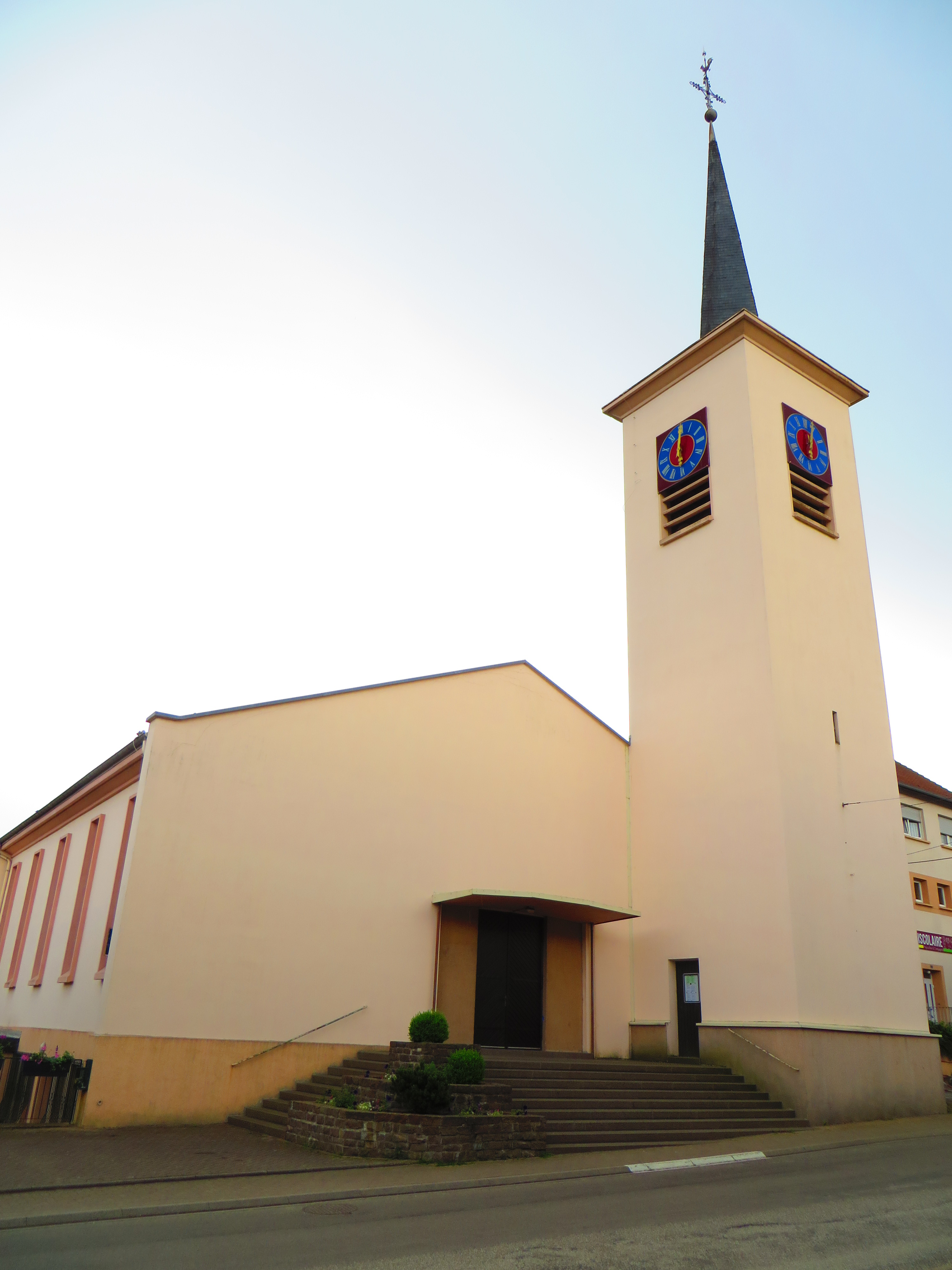
- The church in Lixing-lès-Rouhling

- Coat of arms
- Location of Lixing-lès-Rouhling
- Location within France Location within Grand Est
- Coordinates: 49°09′16″N 6°59′43″E
- Country: France
- Region: Grand Est
- Department: Moselle
- Arrondissement: Sarreguemines
- Canton: Sarreguemines
- Intercommunality: CA Sarreguemines Confluences

Government
  - Mayor (2020–2026): Christiane Mallick
- Area^{1}: 4.22 km^{2} (1.63 sq mi)
- Highest elevation: 343 m (1,125 ft)
- Lowest elevation: 210 m (690 ft)
- Population (2023): 799
  - Density: 189/km^{2} (490/sq mi)
- Time zone: UTC+01:00 (CET)
  - Summer (DST): UTC+02:00 (CEST)
- INSEE/Postal code: 57408 /57520
- ^{1} French Land Register data, which excludes lakes, ponds, glaciers > 1 km^{2} (0.386 sq mi or 247 acres) and river estuaries.

Lixing-lès-Rouhling (French pronunciation: [liksɛ̃ lɛ ʁulɛ̃], literally Lixing near Rouhling; German: Lixingen) is a commune in the Moselle department in Grand Est in north-eastern France.

== Population ==
Historical population
Year	Pop.	±% p.a.
1968	675	—
1975	734	+1.20%
1982	717	−0.33%
1990	789	+1.20%
1999	830	+0.56%
2007	896	+0.96%
2012	915	+0.42%
2017	937	+0.48%
2023	799	−2.62%
Source: INSEE

== See also ==
- Communes of the Moselle department
