= Hundling =

- Commune
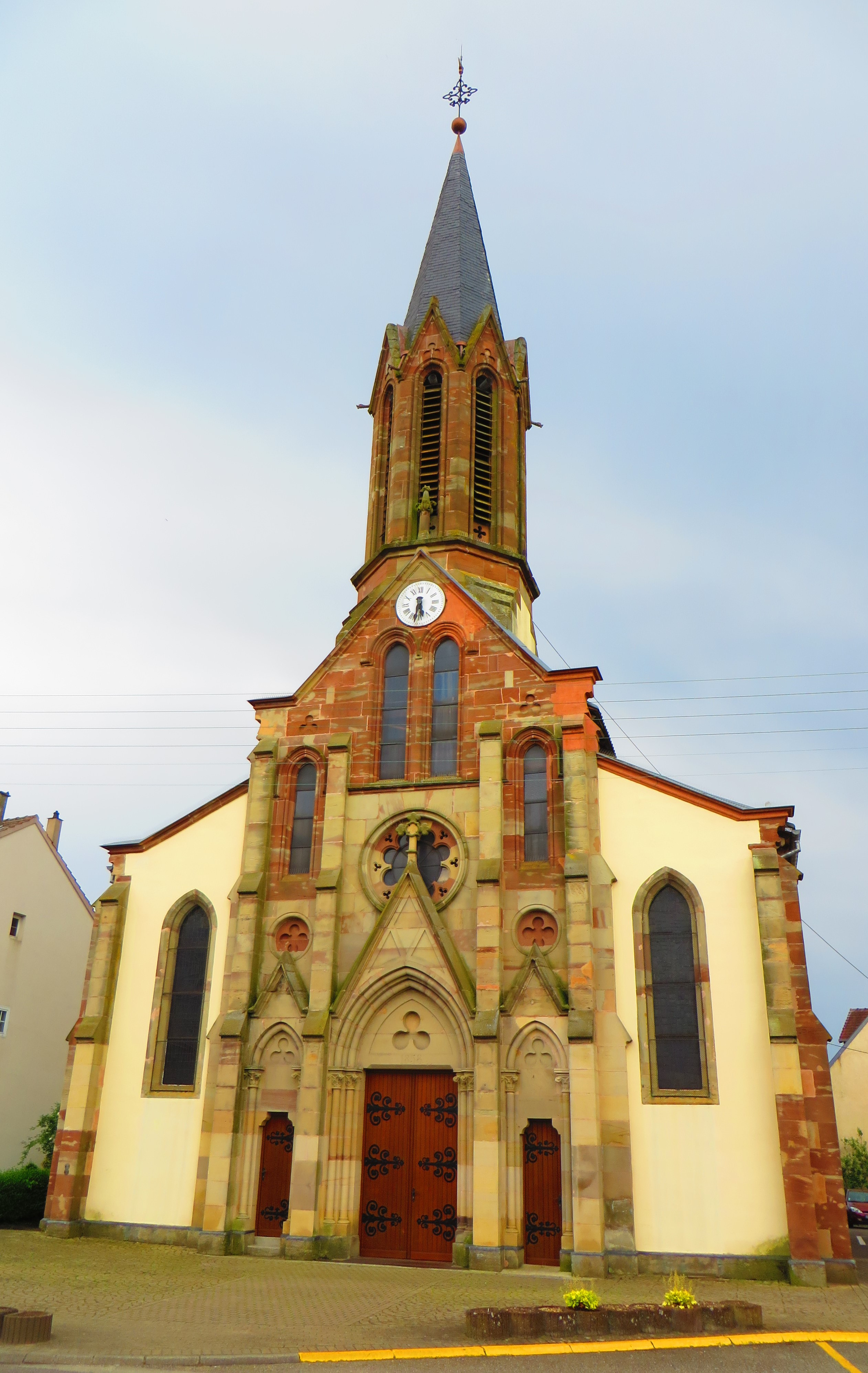
- The church in Hundling

- Coat of arms
- Location of Hundling
- Location within France Location within Grand Est
- Coordinates: 49°06′28″N 6°58′56″E
- Country: France
- Region: Grand Est
- Department: Moselle
- Arrondissement: Sarreguemines
- Canton: Sarreguemines
- Intercommunality: CA Sarreguemines Confluences

Government
  - Mayor (2020–2026): Patricia Momper
- Area^{1}: 6.63 km^{2} (2.56 sq mi)
- Highest elevation: 321 m (1,053 ft)
- Lowest elevation: 209 m (686 ft)
- Population (2023): 1,339
  - Density: 202/km^{2} (523/sq mi)
- Time zone: UTC+01:00 (CET)
  - Summer (DST): UTC+02:00 (CEST)
- INSEE/Postal code: 57340 /57990
- ^{1} French Land Register data, which excludes lakes, ponds, glaciers > 1 km^{2} (0.386 sq mi or 247 acres) and river estuaries.

Hundling (French pronunciation: [undlɛ̃]; German: Hundlingen) is a commune in the Moselle department in Grand Est in north-eastern France.

== See also ==
- Communes of the Moselle department
