= Zetting =

- Commune
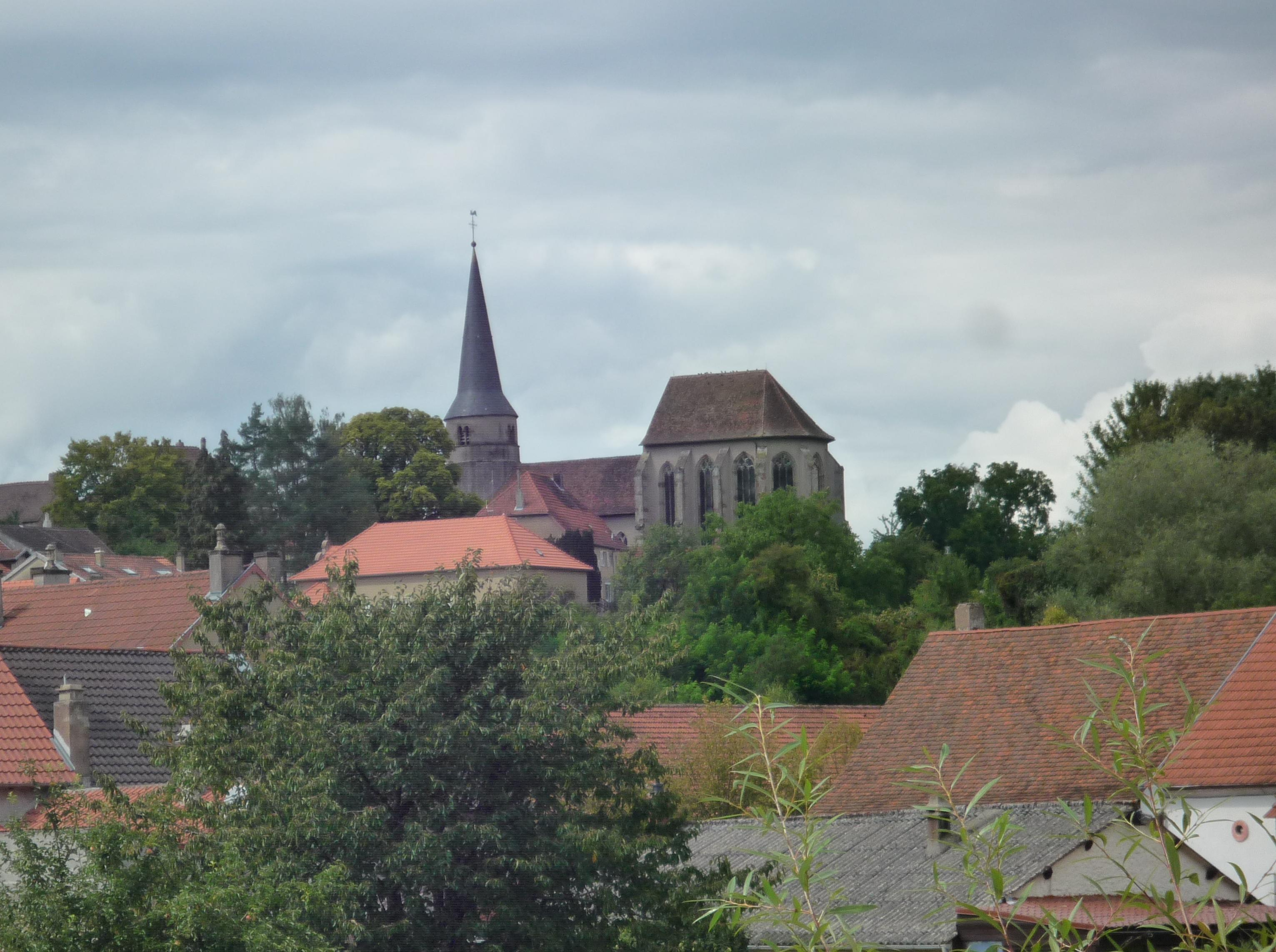
- Church St. Marcel in Zetting

- Coat of arms
- Location of Zetting
- Location within France Location within Grand Est
- Coordinates: 49°04′53″N 7°07′52″E
- Country: France
- Region: Grand Est
- Department: Moselle
- Arrondissement: Sarreguemines
- Canton: Sarreguemines
- Intercommunality: CA Sarreguemines Confluences

Government
  - Mayor (2020–2026): Bernard Fouilhac-Gary
- Area^{1}: 6.94 km^{2} (2.68 sq mi)
- Highest elevation: 293 m (961 ft)
- Lowest elevation: 195 m (640 ft)
- Population (2023): 875
  - Density: 126/km^{2} (327/sq mi)
- Demonym(s): Zettingeois, Zettingeoises
- Time zone: UTC+01:00 (CET)
  - Summer (DST): UTC+02:00 (CEST)
- INSEE/Postal code: 57760 /57905
- ^{1} French Land Register data, which excludes lakes, ponds, glaciers > 1 km^{2} (0.386 sq mi or 247 acres) and river estuaries.

Zetting (French pronunciation: [zɛtɛ̃]; German: Settingen) is a commune in the Moselle department in Grand Est in north-eastern France.

== Population ==
Historical population

Year	Pop.	±% p.a.
1806	539	—
1821	548	+0.11%
1836	563	+0.18%
1841	600	+1.28%
1861	620	+0.16%
1866	687	+2.07%
1871	679	−0.23%
1875	698	+0.69%
1880	712	+0.40%
1885	683	−0.83%
1890	672	−0.32%
1895	740	+1.95%
1900	734	−0.16%
1905	733	−0.03%
1910	723	−0.27%
1921	699	−0.31%

Year	Pop.	±% p.a.
1926	675	−0.70%
1931	700	+0.73%
1936	725	+0.70%
1946	748	+0.31%
1954	744	−0.07%
1962	836	+1.47%
1968	859	+0.45%
1975	865	+0.10%
1982	839	−0.44%
1990	849	+0.15%
1999	864	+0.19%
2007	769	−1.45%
2012	853	+2.10%
2017	825	−0.67%
2023	875	+0.99%

Source: EHESS (1793-1999) and INSEE

== See also ==
- Communes of the Moselle department
