= Sarreinsming =

- Commune
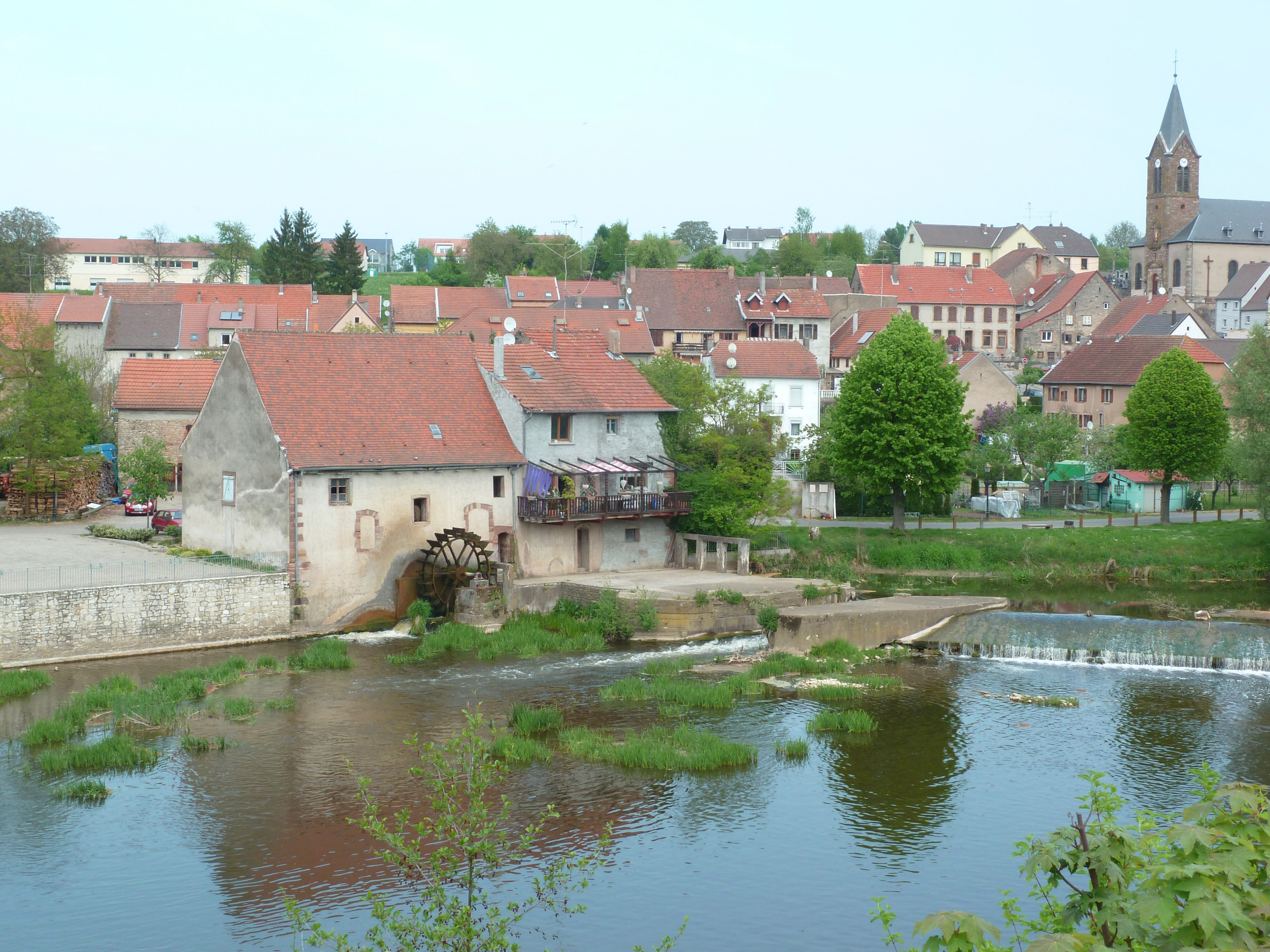
- The mill in Sarreinsming
- Location of Sarreinsming
- Location within France Location within Grand Est
- Coordinates: 49°05′23″N 7°06′34″E
- Country: France
- Region: Grand Est
- Department: Moselle
- Arrondissement: Sarreguemines
- Canton: Sarreguemines
- Intercommunality: CA Sarreguemines Confluences

Government
  - Mayor (2020–2026): Yves Zins
- Area^{1}: 6.98 km^{2} (2.69 sq mi)
- Highest elevation: 310 m (1,020 ft)
- Lowest elevation: 194 m (636 ft)
- Population (2023): 1,178
  - Density: 169/km^{2} (437/sq mi)
- Time zone: UTC+01:00 (CET)
  - Summer (DST): UTC+02:00 (CEST)
- INSEE/Postal code: 57633 /57905
- ^{1} French Land Register data, which excludes lakes, ponds, glaciers > 1 km^{2} (0.386 sq mi or 247 acres) and river estuaries.

Sarreinsming (French pronunciation: [saʁɛ̃smɛ̃]; German: Saareinsmingen; Lorraine Franconian: Äänsminge) is a commune in the Moselle department in Grand Est in north-eastern France.

== See also ==
- Communes of the Moselle department
