= Rouhling =

- Commune
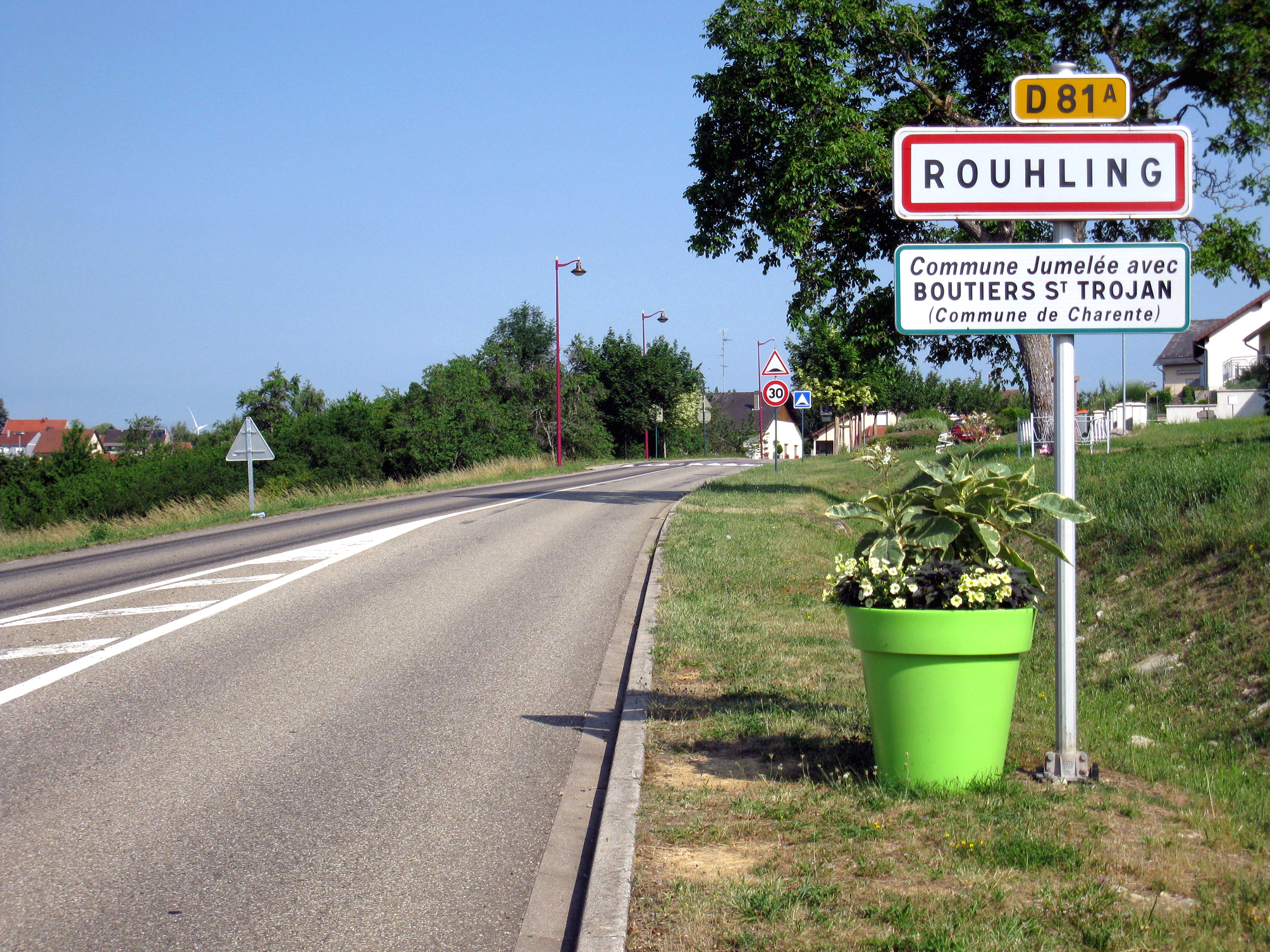
- The road into Rouhling

- Coat of arms
- Location of Rouhling
- Location within France Location within Grand Est
- Coordinates: 49°08′17″N 7°00′12″E
- Country: France
- Region: Grand Est
- Department: Moselle
- Arrondissement: Sarreguemines
- Canton: Sarreguemines
- Intercommunality: CA Sarreguemines Confluences

Government
  - Mayor (2020–2026): Jean Luc Eberhart
- Area^{1}: 6.02 km^{2} (2.32 sq mi)
- Highest elevation: 344 m (1,129 ft)
- Lowest elevation: 241 m (791 ft)
- Population (2023): 1,981
  - Density: 329/km^{2} (852/sq mi)
- Time zone: UTC+01:00 (CET)
  - Summer (DST): UTC+02:00 (CEST)
- INSEE/Postal code: 57598 /57520
- ^{1} French Land Register data, which excludes lakes, ponds, glaciers > 1 km^{2} (0.386 sq mi or 247 acres) and river estuaries.

Rouhling (French pronunciation: [ʁulɛ̃]; German: Ruhlingen) is a commune in the Moselle department in Grand Est in north-eastern France.

== See also ==
- Communes of the Moselle department
