= Cantons of France =

Territorial subdivisions of France

Canton
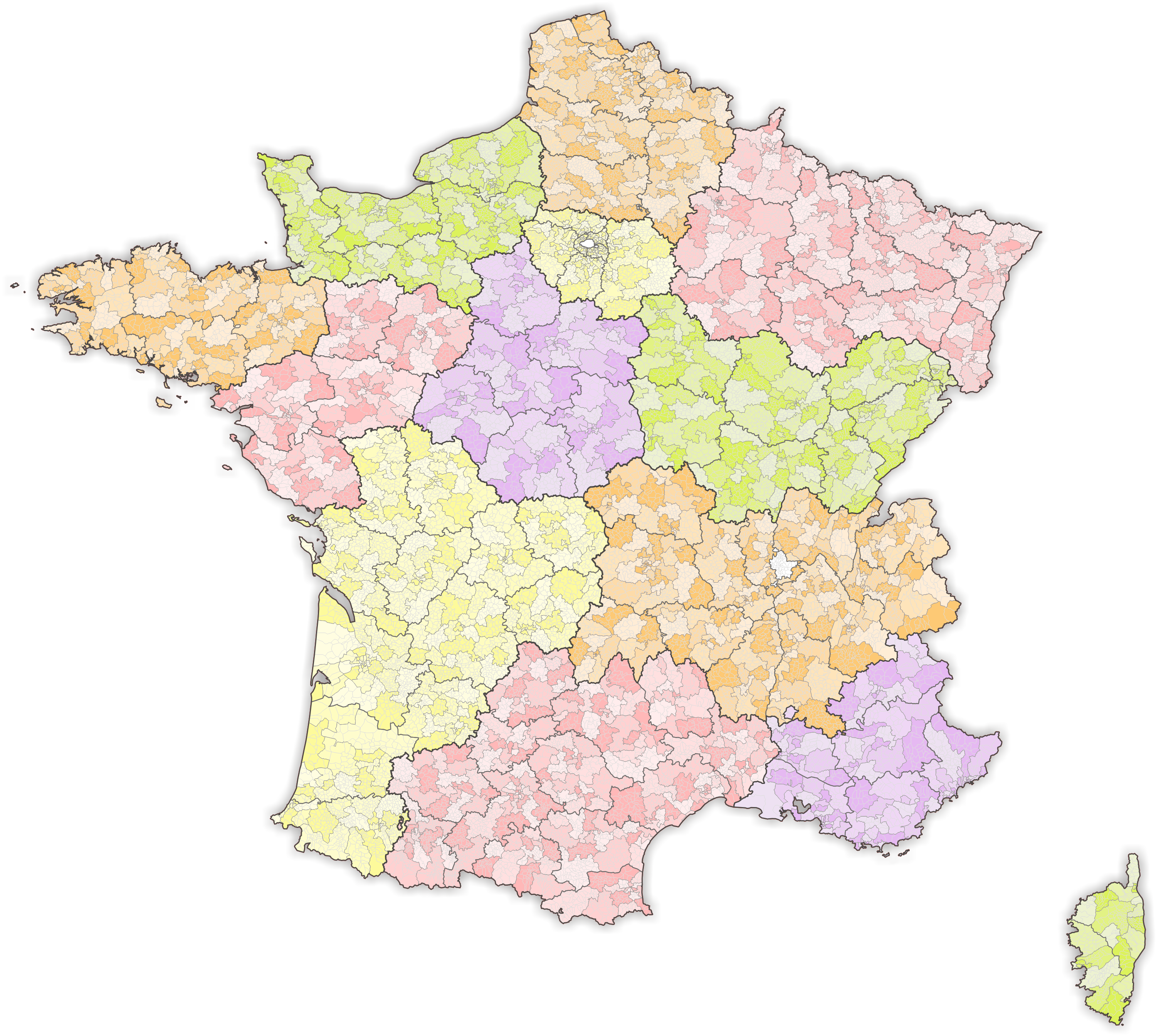
- Cantons of metropolitan France
- Category: Fourth-level administrative division
- Location: Regions of France
- Number: 2,054 (as of 2015)
- Government: Departmental council

The cantons of France (French pronunciation: [kɑ̃tɔ̃]) are territorial subdivisions of the French Republic's departments and arrondissements.

Apart from their role as organizational units in relation to certain aspects of the administration of public services and justice, the chief purpose of the cantons today is to serve as constituencies for the election of members of the representative assemblies established in each of France's territorial departments (departmental councils, formerly general councils). For this reason, such elections were known in France as "cantonal elections", until 2015 when their name was changed to "departmental elections" to match the departmental councils' name.

There are 2,054 cantons in France.

Most of them group together a number of communes (the lowest administrative division of the French Republic), although larger communes may be included in more than one canton, since the cantons – in marked contrast to the communes, which have between more than two million inhabitants (Paris) and just one person (Rochefourchat) – are intended to be roughly equal in size of population for electoral purposes.

== Role and administration ==
The role of the canton is, essentially, to provide a framework for departmental elections. Each canton elects a woman and a man to represent it at the conseil départemental du département – or departmental council for the department, which is the principal administrative division of the French Republic.

In urban areas, a single commune generally includes several cantons. Conversely, in rural areas, a canton may comprise several smaller communes. In the latter case, administrative services, the gendarmerie headquarters for example, are often situated in the principal town (chef-lieu) of the canton, although there are exceptions, such as cantons Gaillon-Campagne and Sarreguemines-Campagne, which have in common a "chief-town" which does not belong to either canton.

For statistical (INSEE) purposes, the twenty arrondissements of Paris – the administrative subdivisions of that city – are sometimes considered cantons, but they serve no greater electoral function.

Cantons also form legal districts, as seats of Tribunaux d'instance (TI) or Courts of First Instance. Historically, the cantons are called justices de paix or "district courts".

== History ==
The cantons were created in 1790 at the same time as the départements by the Revolutionary Committee for the Division of Territory (Comité de division). They were more numerous than today (between 40 and 60 to each département). Cantons were, at first, grouped into what were called districts. After the abolition of the district in 1800, they were reorganized by the Consulate into arrondissements. The number of cantons was then drastically reduced (between 30 and 50 units) by the Loi du 8 pluviôse an IX (28 January 1801), or the "Law for the Reduction of the Number of District Courts", or Loi portant réduction du nombre de justices de paix in French. The département prefects were told by the government to group the communes within newly established cantons. The département lists, once approved by the government, were published in the Bulletin des lois in 1801 and 1802; these lists were the basis of the administrative divisions of France from then until 2015, although cantons with small populations were eliminated and new cantons created in areas of strong demographic growth. On the whole, their number increased appreciably.

In May 2013 a law was adopted that reduced the number of cantons drastically. This law came into effect at the French departmental elections in March 2015. Before the cantonal reform, there were 4,032 cantons; afterwards there were 2,054, with the cantons in Martinique and Guyana abolished. The 2013 reform law also changed the representation of the cantons in the departmental councils: each canton is now represented by a man and a woman.

== Statistics ==
The number of cantons varies from one département to another. The Territoire de Belfort has the fewest at 9, while Nord has the most at 41. The average figure is about 21.

== See also ==
- Administrative divisions of France
- Canton (administrative division)
- List of cantons of France
