= Lambach (disambiguation) =

Lambach is a market town in the Wels-Land district of Upper Austria.

Lambach may also refer to:

== Populated places ==
- Lambach, Moselle, a commune in the Moselle department in north-eastern France
- Neukirchen bei Lambach, a municipality in the district of Wels-Land in the Austrian state of Upper Austria
- Edt bei Lambach, a municipality in the district of Wels-Land in the Austrian state of Upper Austria

== Rivers ==
- Lambach (Loper Bach), a river of North Rhine-Westphalia, Germany, tributary of the Loper Bach
- Lambach (Eickumer Mühlenbach), a river of North Rhine-Westphalia, Germany, tributary of the Eickumer Mühlenbach

== Aviation ==
- Lambach HL.I, a trainer aircraft designed and built by the Delft Student Aeroclub in the Netherlands in the 1930s
- Lambach HL.II, a single seat aerobatic biplane designed and built in the Netherlands in the 1930s
- SSVOBB "Lambach Aircraft", an aircraft student society at TU Delft in the Netherlands

== Military ==
- Helmut Lambach (1918–2000), Hauptmann in the Wehrmacht during World War II
- Battle of Lambach, a minor French victory during the Napoleonic Wars

== Other ==
- Lambach Abbey, a Benedictine monastery in Lambach in the Wels-Land district of Upper Austria
- Old Lambach Symphony, Symphony, K. 45a written by Mozart
