= Canton of Lemberg =

Lemberg
- Former canton
- Location within the district of Bitche in 1790
- Country: France
- Region: {{{region}}}
- Department: Moselle
- No. of communes: {{{nbcomm}}}
- Established: 1790
- Disbanded: 1802
- Area: 124.07 km^{2} (47.90 sq mi)
- Population (1800): 6,269
  - Density: 50.53/km^{2} (130.9/sq mi)

The canton of Lemberg is a former canton of France, located in the Moselle department. It was created in 1790 and disbanded in 1802.

Its municipalities are today all part of the canton of Bitche.

1. Althorn
2. Enchenberg
3. Goetzenbruck
4. Holbach
5. Lambach
6. Lemberg (with Saint-Louis)
7. Meisenthal
8. Montbronn
9. Mouterhouse
10. Sarreinsberg
11. Siersthal
12. Soucht

== See also ==
- Cantons of the Moselle department
- Communes of the Moselle department
