= Ramstein Castle =

Ramstein Castle is the name of the following ruined castles:

France

- Château de Ramstein, Bas-Rhin, near Scherwiller, department of Bas-Rhin, Region Grand Est
- Château de Ramstein, Moselle, near Baerenthal, department of Moselle, Region Grand Est

Germany

- Ramstein Castle (Kordel) near Kordel, county of Trier-Saarburg, Rhineland-Palatinate
- Ramstein Castle (Schramberg) near Tennenbronn (Schramberg), county of Rottweil, Baden-Württemberg

Switzerland

- Ramstein Castle (Bretzwil) near Bretzwil, district of Waldenburg, canton of Basel-Landschaft
