= Ramstein =

Ramstein or Rammstein may refer to:

== Places ==
- Ramstein-Miesenbach, Rhineland-Palatinate, Germany, a town
- Ramstein Air Base, a U.S. Air Force base near the town
- Ramstein Castle (Kordel), Germany, a castle
- Château de Ramstein, Bas-Rhin, France, a castle
- Château de Ramstein, Moselle, France, a castle

== Art, entertainment, and media ==
- Rammstein, a German heavy metal band
- "Rammstein" (song), a song by Rammstein, commemorating the Ramstein airshow disaster
- Untitled Rammstein album, a 2019 album, also known as Rammstein

== Other ==
- 110393 Rammstein, an asteroid named after the German band
- Ramstein (wrestler), the ring name of a Mexican professional wrestler
- Ramstein air show disaster, a 1988 mid-air collision at the Ramstein Air Force Base
- Ramstein Group, alternative name of the Ukraine Defense Contact Group
