= Glasenberg =

Glasenberg may refer to:

- Glasenberg, district of Lambach, Moselle
- Ivan Glasenberg (born 1957), businessman
