= Étang de Hanau =

Lake in France

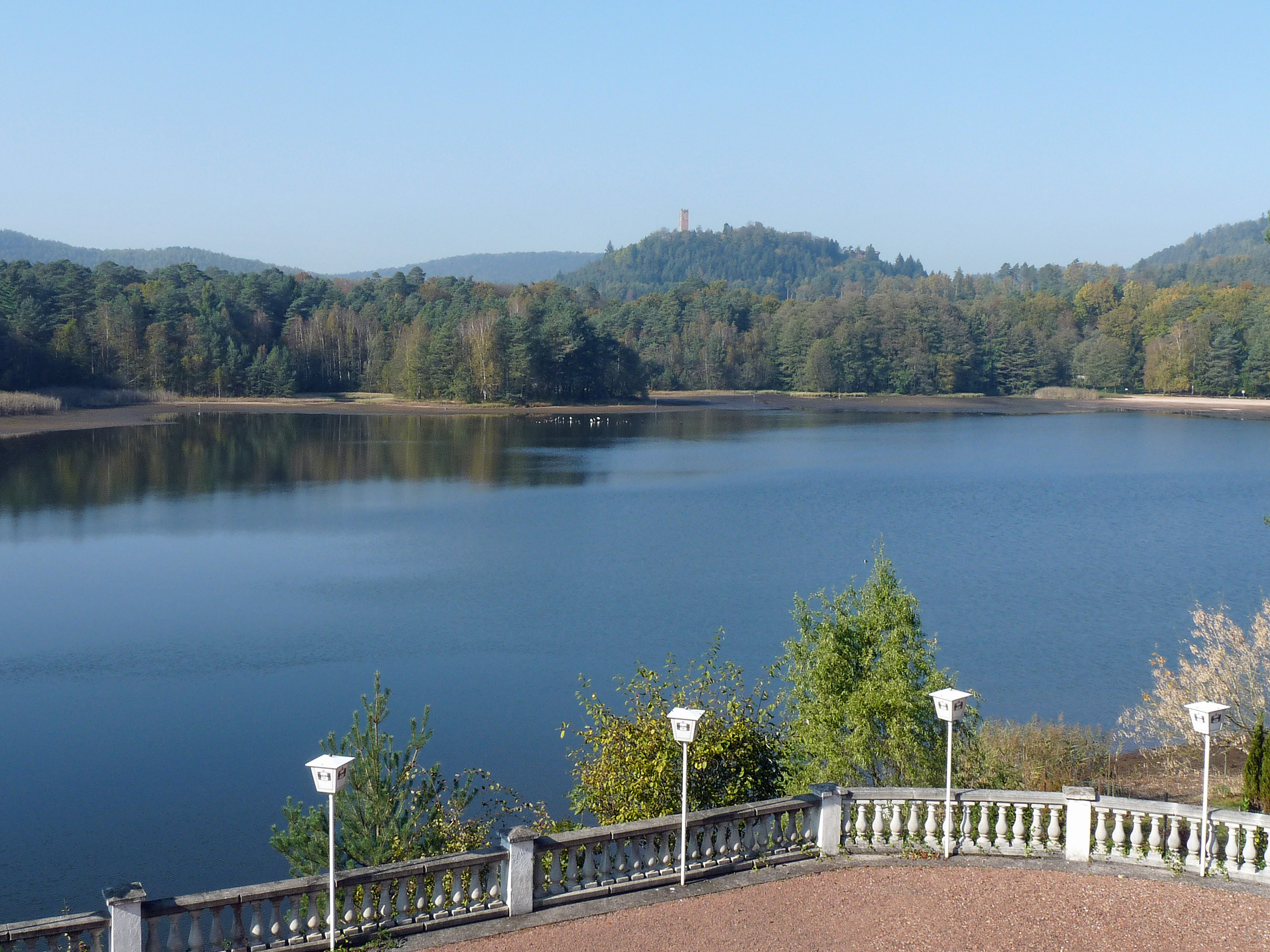
- Pond and Waldeck Castle in the background

- Location within France
- Location: Moselle
- Coordinates: 49°0′37″N 7°32′16″E
- Primary outflows: Waldeck Brook
- Basin countries: France
- Surface area: 0.16 km^{2} (0.062 sq mi)
- Surface elevation: 234 m (768 ft)
- Settlements: Waldeck

Étang de Hanau (German: Hanauer Weiher, literally "Hanau Pond") is a lake in Moselle, France.

The lake is located in the commune of Philippsbourg, near the small hamlet of Waldeck and its castle.

== Fishing ==
The lake has a variety of fish, which include perch, carp, tuna, roach, salmon, bream and tench. As a result, it is a major fishing spot for fisherman and anglers.
