= Lambach (Loper Bach) =

River in North Rhine-Westphalia, Germany

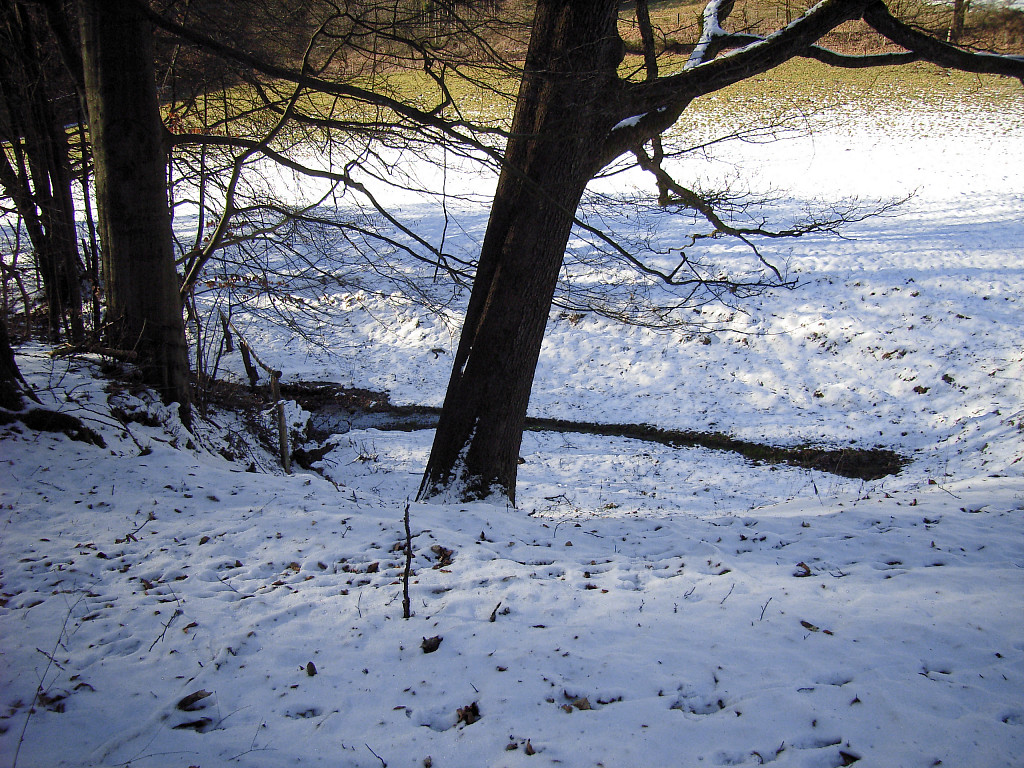

Location
- Country: Germany
- States: North Rhine-Westphalia

Physical characteristics
- Mouth
  - location: Loper Bach
  - coordinates: 50.9966°N 7.5004°E

Basin features
- Progression: Loper Bach→ Agger→ Sieg→ Rhine→ North Sea

Lambach is a small river of North Rhine-Westphalia, Germany. It is 6.2 km long and a right tributary of the Loper Bach. It is one of three streams in North Rhine-Westphalia named Lambach.

== See also ==
- List of rivers of North Rhine-Westphalia
