= La Selve, Aisne =

La Selve
- Commune
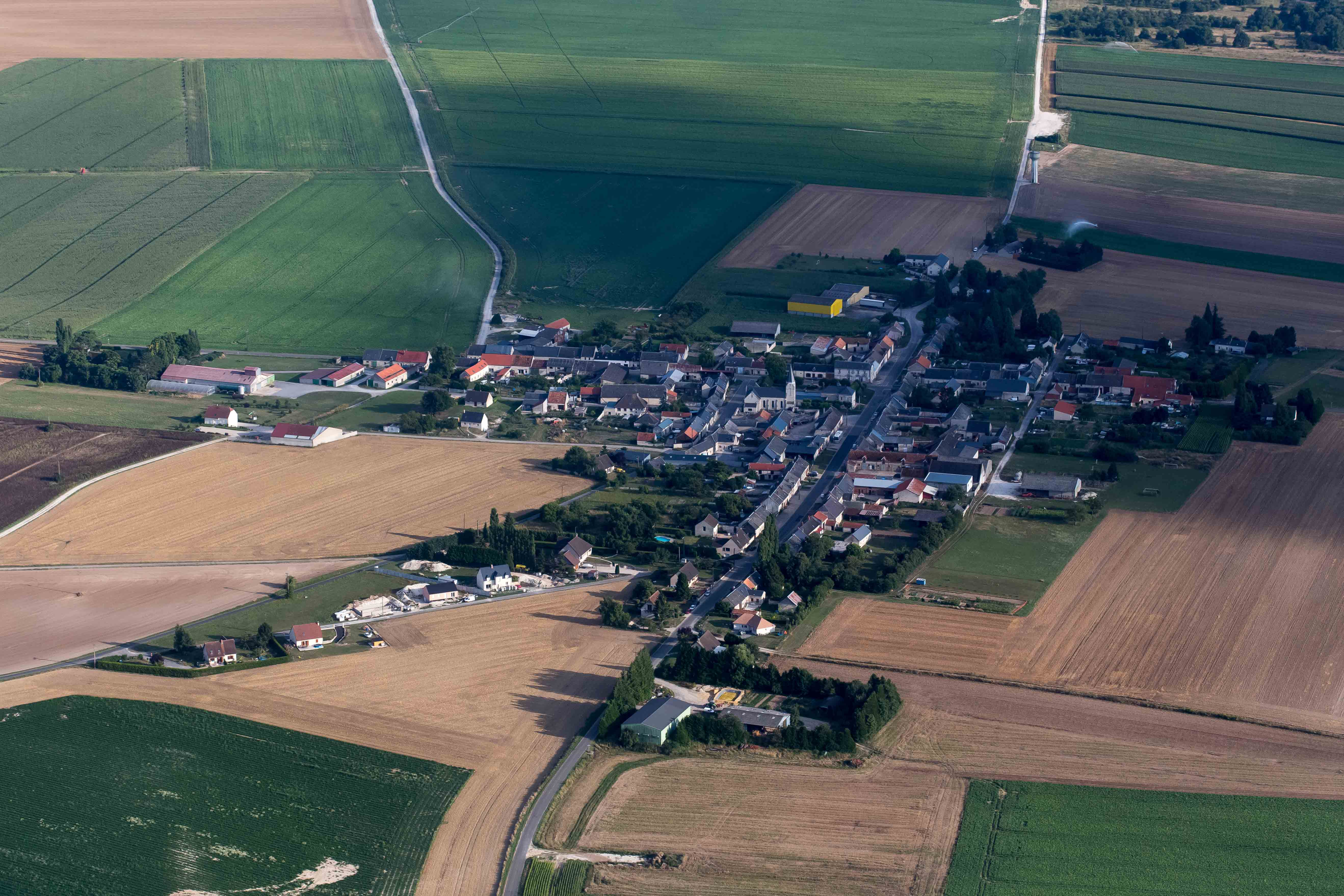
- An aerial view of La Selve
- Location of La Selve
- Location within France Location within Hauts-de-France
- Coordinates: 49°34′15″N 3°59′53″E
- Country: France
- Region: Hauts-de-France
- Department: Aisne
- Arrondissement: Laon
- Canton: Villeneuve-sur-Aisne
- Intercommunality: Champagne Picarde

Government
  - Mayor (2026–32): Alain Lorain
- Area^{1}: 4.77 km^{2} (1.84 sq mi)
- Elevation: 94 m (308 ft)
- Highest elevation: 117 m (384 ft)
- Lowest elevation: 84 m (276 ft)
- Population (2023): 201
  - Density: 42.1/km^{2} (109/sq mi)
- Time zone: UTC+01:00 (CET)
  - Summer (DST): UTC+02:00 (CEST)
- INSEE/Postal code: 02705 /02150
- ^{1} French Land Register data, which excludes lakes, ponds, glaciers > 1 km^{2} (0.386 sq mi or 247 acres) and river estuaries.

La Selve (French pronunciation: [la sɛlv]) is a commune in the Aisne department in Hauts-de-France in northern France.

== Population ==
Historical population
Year	Pop.	±% p.a.
1968	212	—
1975	172	−2.94%
1982	179	+0.57%
1990	186	+0.48%
1999	190	+0.24%
2007	203	+0.83%
2012	209	+0.58%
2017	217	+0.75%
2023	201	−1.27%
Source: INSEE

== See also ==
- Communes of the Aisne department
