= Château de Ramstein, Moselle =

Ruined castle in Moselle, France

Coordinates: 48°59′05″N 7°31′22″E

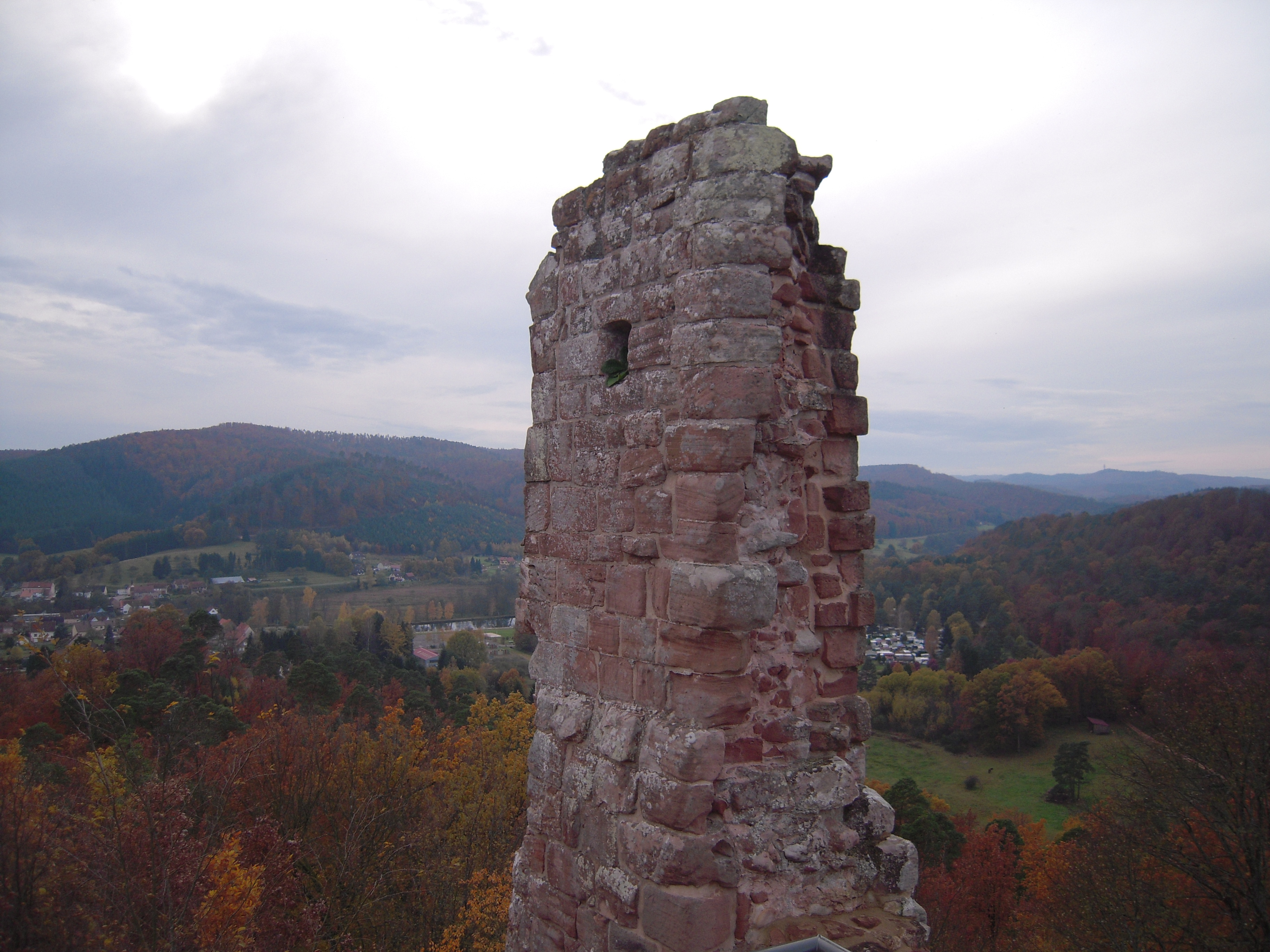
The ruined Château de Ramstein overlooking the village

The Château de Ramstein is a ruined castle in the commune of Baerenthal, in the Moselle département of France.

== History ==
This 13th-century castle was built by the lords of Falkenstein on the instructions of the bishop of Strasbourg to control the Zinselbach valley, probably in 1292. During the course of the 14th century, the lords of Ramstein transformed it into a den of brigands and it was destroyed in 1355 during a punitive expedition by the Strasbourgeois and their allies from Bern.

Below the castle can be seen two underground passages dug in 1936 by French military engineers as part of the Maginot Line. They were used as shelter by the local population during the battles of winter 1944-45. This site is currently closed to protect a colony of bats.

The site is protected since 1938 by the French Ministry of Culture.

== See also ==
- List of castles in France
