= Château de Helfenstein =

Ruined castle in Moselle, Grand Est, France

Coordinates: 49°00′23″N 7°34′10″E

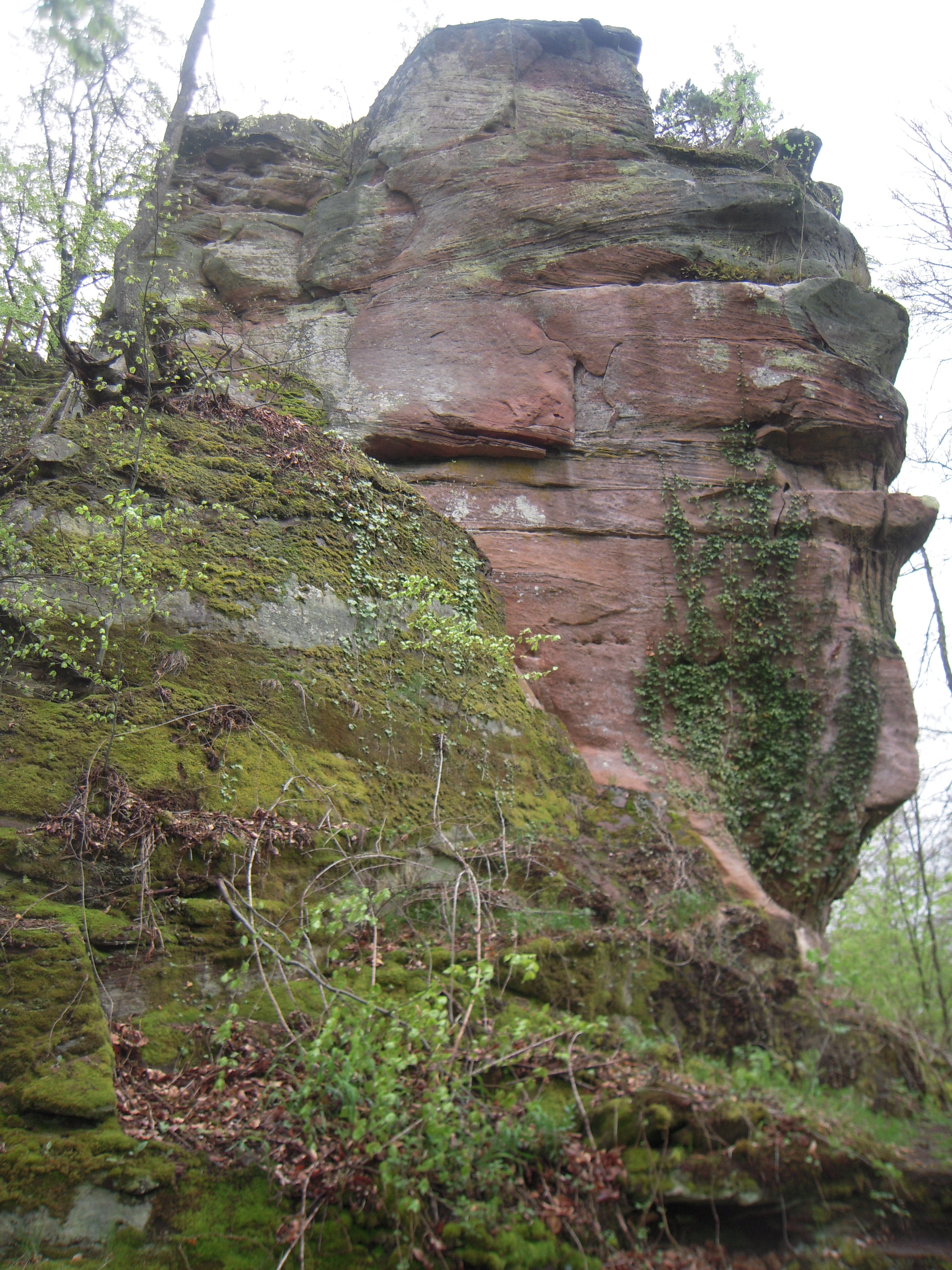
Helfenstein Castle's rock

The Château de Helfenstein (German: Burg Helfenstein) is a ruined castle in the commune of Philippsbourg in the Moselle département of France.

== History ==
The castle is located 100 m from another castle, the Château du Falkenstein. The castle was mentioned in the 14th century as the property of the Dukes of Lorraine. It passed as a fief to the Wasselonne family and was destroyed around 1435. In 1437, the Bishop of Strasbourg settled a difference between Guillaume de Falkenstein and Frédéric de Thann concerning the demolished fortress, zerbrochene Feste, of Helfenstein.

Following its destruction, the castle effectively disappeared from view and was virtually unknown until 1928 when Ad. Malye discovered and excavated it following research in documents and on the ground.

Today, the site makes an agreeable sporting promenade. The site exhibits very little in the way of remains - among other finds, a well was discovered in 1928. The ruins are state property.

== See also ==
- List of castles in France
