= SSVOBB "Lambach Aircraft" =

SSVOBB is the acronym for Stichting Studenten Vliegtuigontwikkeling, -bouw en -beheer which is Dutch for Foundation for Students in Airplane development, manufacturing and management.

== The Foundation ==
The SSVOBB is a non-profit-foundation of students in Aerospace Engineering at the Delft University of Technology in Delft, Netherlands dedicated to giving students practical experience in the design, manufacture and flight of fixed-wing aircraft. The organisation was founded on January 19, 1990, when students of the faculty organised the building of their first aircraft the Lambach HL II.

== Lambach HL II ==
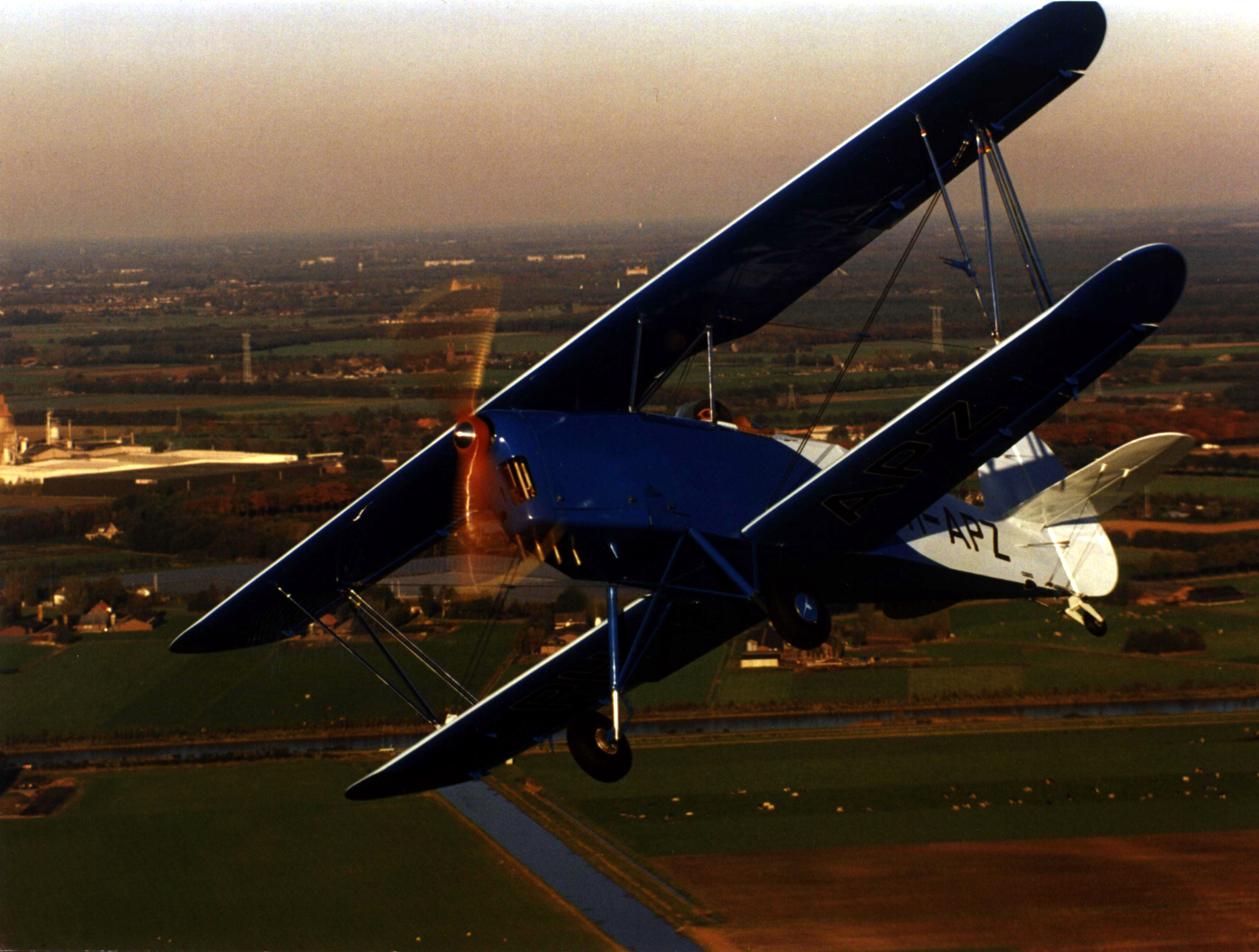
Lambach HL II replica in-flight

=== The original ===
The original Lambach HL.II was commissioned by Dutch aviation enthusiasts to try to beat the superior German aerobatics aircraft in aerobatics contests. It was completely designed and built within six months by the Dutch engineer and Delft University of Technology graduate Hugo Lambach. The biplane had a steel tube, cloth-covered fuselage, wooden wings and tail and was powered by a Gipsy Major Mk.1. After test flights the aircraft was successful at several air shows where it proved to be a unique aerobatics aircraft, although the German aircraft continued to win. The aircraft was destroyed during a German bombing raid on the Ypenburg Airport near The Hague on May 10, 1940.

=== Hugo Lambach ===
Hugo Lambach was a Delft graduate in applied physics. During his study he designed and built his first aircraft, the Lambach HL.I. After graduation he worked with Koolhoven Vliegtuigfabrieken. With the commissioning of the Lambach HL II, he started his own aircraft factory, Lambach Vliegtuigfabrieken, which ultimately only produced one aircraft. After the war, Lambach worked with Fokker for several years and had his own engineering company. Hugo Lambach died July 8, 1972.

=== Replica ===
The replica started out as a student's joke in 1989 to organise a stunt in honour of the 45th anniversary of the Society of Aerospace Students 'Leonardo da Vinci'. Thanks to a complete set of drawings found in the Aviodrome museum and the help of Hugo Lambach's main engineer Willem de Koo, the students managed to complete the aircraft in six years. Its first flight took place on September 18, 1995. The aircraft was demonstrated at several air shows in the Netherlands and Belgium during 1996. In 1997, inspection showed the need for heavy maintenance which has grounded the aircraft since.

Maintenance continued on the replica while it was stored at the aviation museum Aviodrome, at Lelystad Airport. Maintenance was required to reinforce the engine mount to better handle engine vibrations and update the instrument panel. The panel needed to be updated to comply with modern regulation, as such the replica will, unlike the original, be equipped with radio and transponder.

On May 6, 2017, ownership of the aircraft was transferred to the Early Birds Foundation for further restoration, and the aircraft was re-entered into the Dutch aircraft register. Although it continues to be restored to flightworthy condition, Lambach Aircraft is no longer heavily involved in the project.

== The Impuls ==
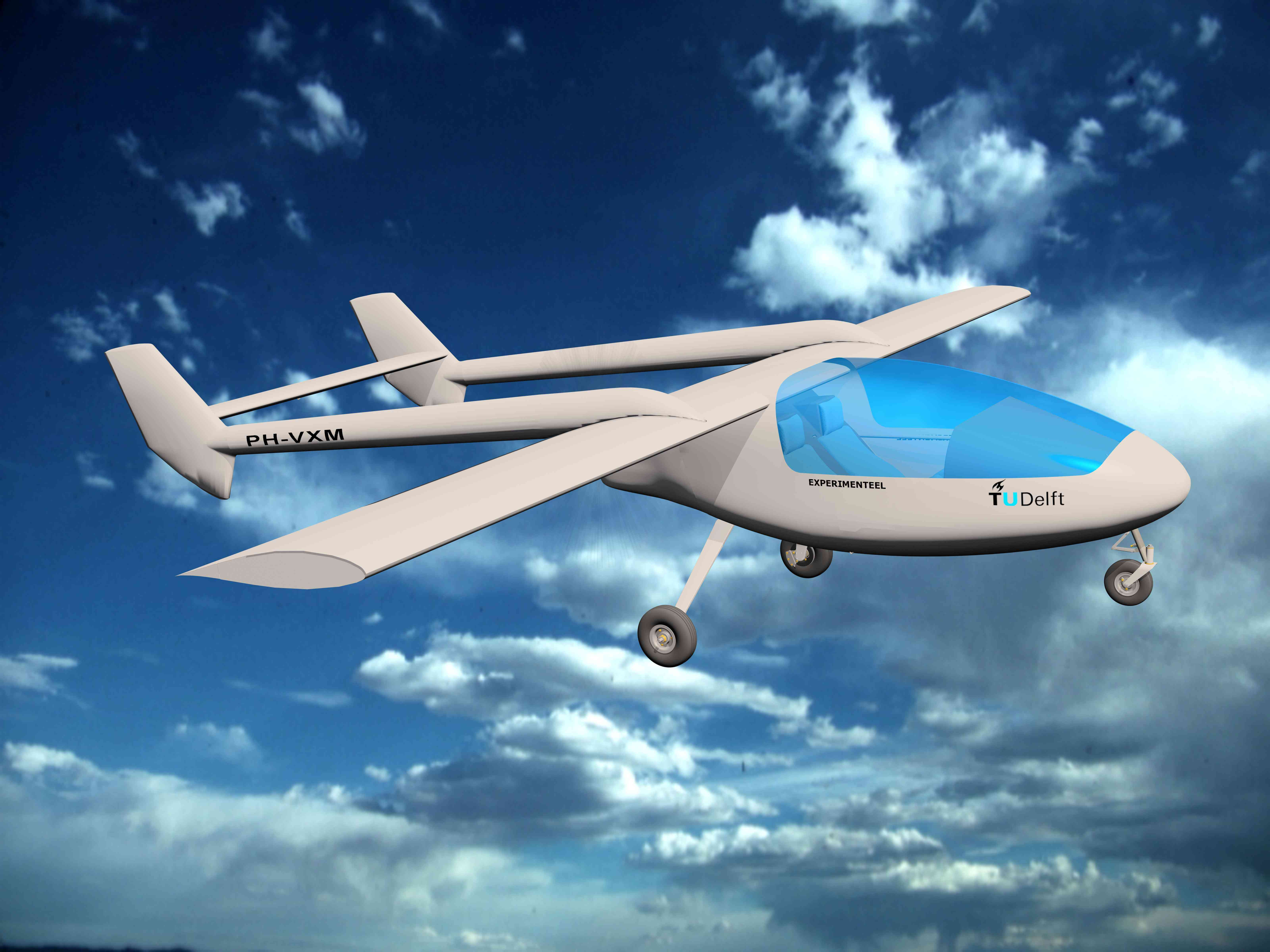
A 2004 artist impression of the Impuls

In 1994 the society started working on their second project: the Impuls (Dutch for momentum, registration PH-VXM (velocity times mass)), which was designed by the society's students only. The design started in 1994, but by the summer of 2010 the society decided to freeze the project.

The Impuls concept consisted of a 2-seat FAR-23 certified aircraft, propelled by an engine in a pusher configuration. Other distinctive characteristics were the two tail booms and the large windows ensuring a broad view. Materials characterising the Impuls, were the (then state of the art) glass fibre composite used in wings, tail booms and outer fuselage shell. The inner fuselage however, still consisted of a load carrying steel inner frame as monocoque composite constructions were still very rare back in the '90s.

== The S-Vision ==
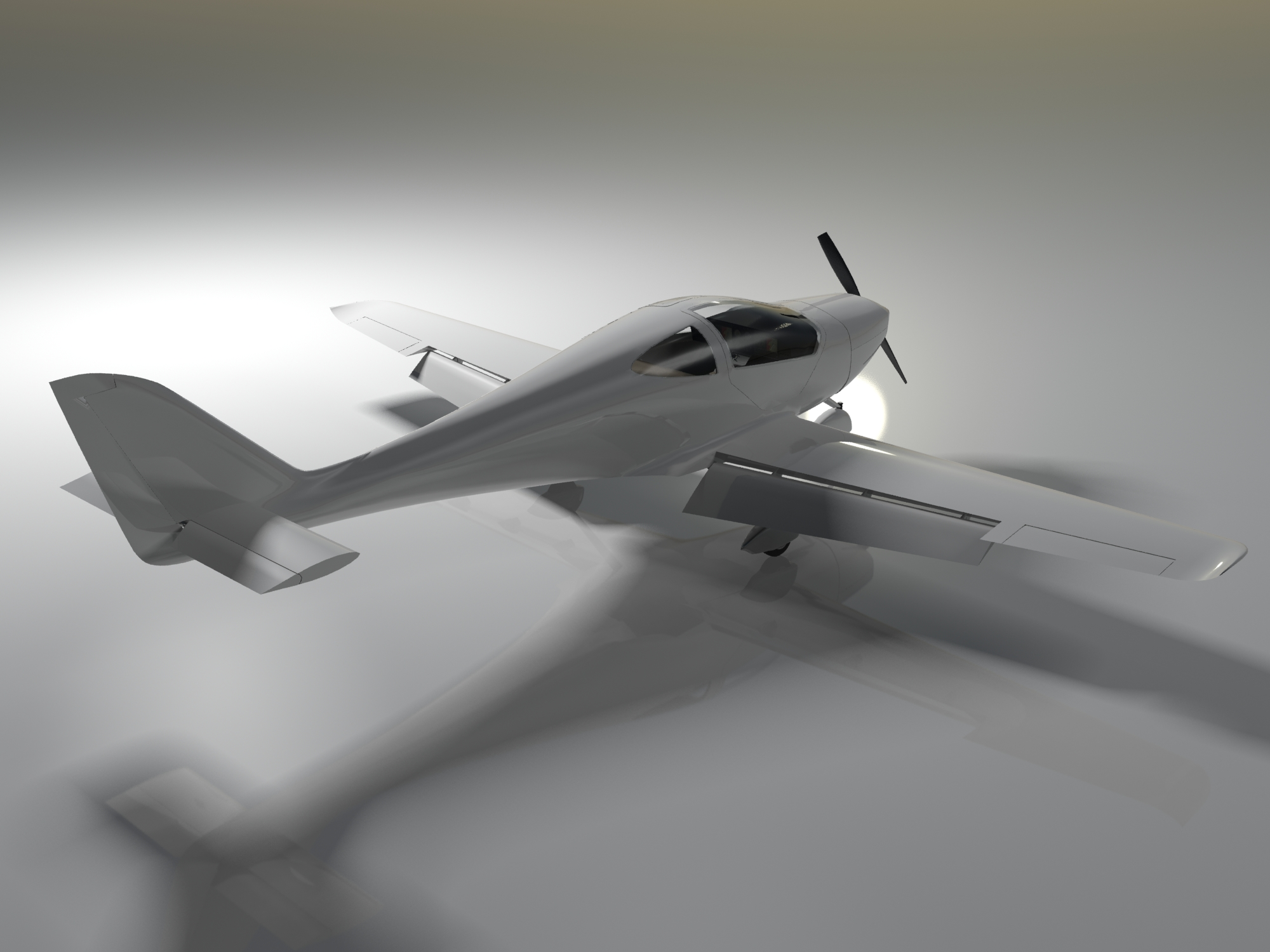
A preliminary design render of the S-Vision

In December 2009, SSVOBB Lambach Aircraft decided to freeze the Impuls-project and the remaining time of that academic year was used to make a thorough evaluation of the project. By the summer of 2010, after having conducted a feasibility study, the society decided to make a second attempt at building an own designed aircraft, which would later be named: S-Vision.

Unlike the design of the Impuls, that of the S-Vision was substantially more conventional. The S- Vision was to have a low wing, fixed gear and single tail boom. The aircraft was to be certified according to EASA CS-VLA, which was introduced in 2003. Power will be generated by a four-cylinder opposing engine providing 130Hp driving the pull-prop. As the society gained experience in the manufacturing of composites and aluminium during the Impuls-project, these were chosen to be the main materials used in the S-Vision.

Design on the S-Vision started in September 2010 and in the following three years the conceptual and preliminary design were fully completed. By the spring of 2014 volunteers started working on material testing. Work ceased in 2016, as resources were focused on the restoration of the Lambach HL II replica.

== UAVs ==
Lambach Aircraft transitioned to the design and construction of UAVs. Since 2018, the association has competed in BMFA Payload and Quantity Challenges, seeing varying success. In 2023, the association constructed an entry to the Vertical Flying Society (VFS) Student Design Competition, although did not ultimately compete. Lambach Aircraft is currently also developing 'Project ATTIS', a long-range UAV for imaging of conservation reserves, and conducting research into UAV wing manufacturing techniques. The association also runs its own 'Introduction to RC UAV Manufacturing' course for first-year Delft University of Technology aerospace engineering students.
