= Bettviller =

- Commune
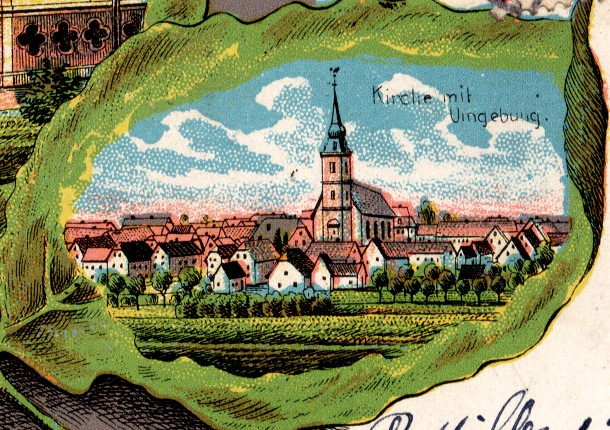
- A depiction of Bettviller in 1904

- Coat of arms
- Location of Bettviller
- Location within France Location within Grand Est
- Coordinates: 49°04′43″N 7°17′12″E
- Country: France
- Region: Grand Est
- Department: Moselle
- Arrondissement: Sarreguemines
- Canton: Bitche
- Intercommunality: CC du Pays de Bitche

Government
  - Mayor (2020–2026): Stéphan Muller
- Area^{1}: 18.41 km^{2} (7.11 sq mi)
- Elevation: 305 m (1,001 ft)
- Highest elevation: 376 m (1,234 ft)
- Lowest elevation: 252 m (827 ft)
- Population (2023): 815
  - Density: 44.3/km^{2} (115/sq mi)
- Time zone: UTC+01:00 (CET)
  - Summer (DST): UTC+02:00 (CEST)
- INSEE/Postal code: 57074 /57410
- ^{1} French Land Register data, which excludes lakes, ponds, glaciers > 1 km^{2} (0.386 sq mi or 247 acres) and river estuaries.

Bettviller (French pronunciation: [bɛtvilɛʁ]; German: Bettweiler) is a commune in the Moselle department of the Grand Est administrative region in north-eastern France.

The village belongs to the Pays de Bitche. It is mentioned for the first time in 1157, in the forms "Bedebur" and "Bedeviller" in 1496 (oratory). The present village was built in the 16th century.

== Population ==
Historical population
Year	Pop.	±% p.a.
1968	826	—
1975	752	−1.33%
1982	729	−0.44%
1990	697	−0.56%
1999	743	+0.71%
2007	845	+1.62%
2012	844	−0.02%
2017	831	−0.31%
2023	815	−0.32%
Source: INSEE

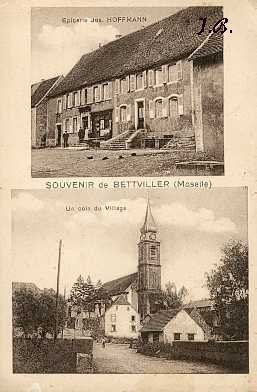
Bettviller, old postcard

== See also ==
- Communes of the Moselle department
