= Gumbrechtshoffen =

Gumbrechtshoffen Gumbertshoffe
- Commune
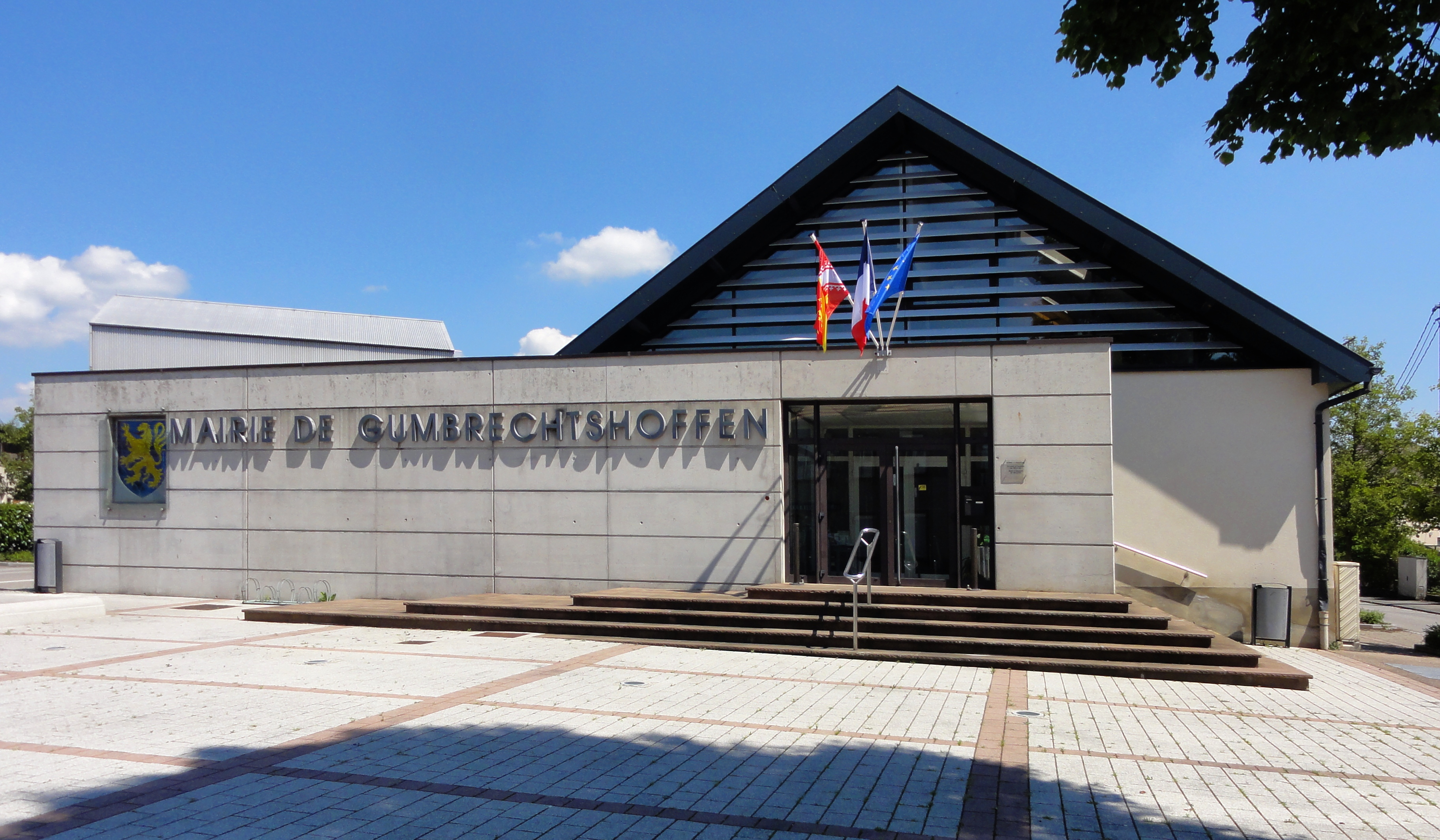
- The town hall in Gumbrechtshoffen

- Coat of arms
- Location of Gumbrechtshoffen
- Location within France Location within Grand Est
- Coordinates: 48°54′21″N 7°37′51″E
- Country: France
- Region: Grand Est
- Department: Bas-Rhin
- Arrondissement: Haguenau-Wissembourg
- Canton: Reichshoffen

Government
  - Mayor (2020–2026): Estelle Duchmann
- Area^{1}: 5.74 km^{2} (2.22 sq mi)
- Highest elevation: 271 m (889 ft)
- Lowest elevation: 167 m (548 ft)
- Population (2023): 1,113
  - Density: 194/km^{2} (502/sq mi)
- Time zone: UTC+01:00 (CET)
  - Summer (DST): UTC+02:00 (CEST)
- INSEE/Postal code: 67174 /67110
- ^{1} French Land Register data, which excludes lakes, ponds, glaciers > 1 km^{2} (0.386 sq mi or 247 acres) and river estuaries.

Gumbrechtshoffen (German: Gumprechtshofen) is a commune in the Bas-Rhin department in Grand Est in north-eastern France, approximately 18 kilometres (eleven miles) northwest of Haguenau.

On 1 September 1945 the villages of Gumbrechtshoffen-Oberbronn (Obergumbrechtshoffen in Alsatian) and Gumbrechtshoffen-Niederbronn (Niedergumbrechtshoffen) merged.

== Geography ==
The commune is positioned between Niederbronn and Haguenau, a couple of kilometres to the west of the main road that connects the two. It is traversed by the river River Zinsel.

== See also ==
- Communes of the Bas-Rhin department
