= Zinsel du Nord =

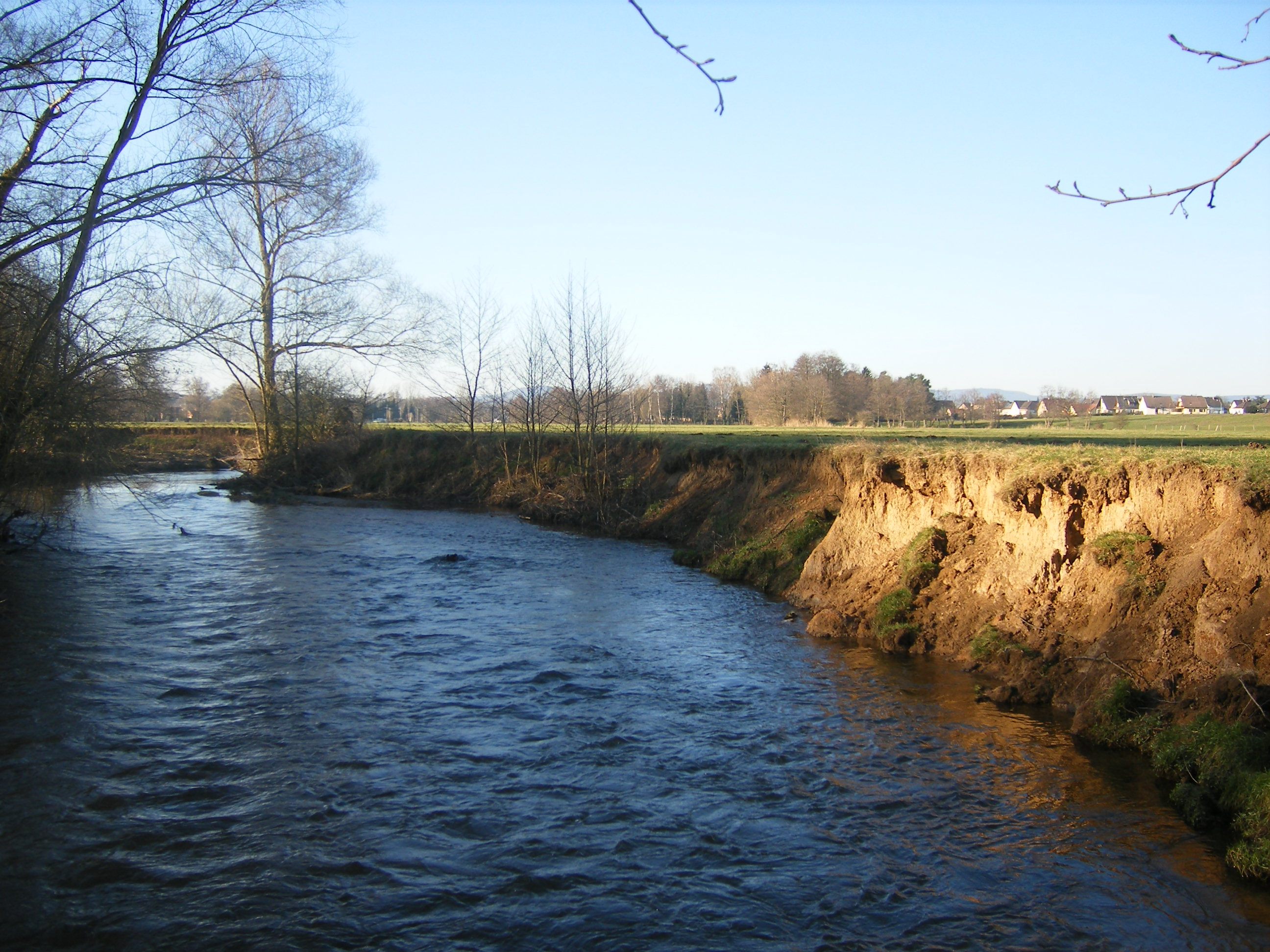
- The Northern Zinsel in Mertzwiller

- Location within France Location within Grand Est

Location
- Country: France
- Region: Grand Est
- Department: Moselle
- Reference no.: FR: "A32-0200" (in French). Sandre.

Physical characteristics
- Source
  - location: The source of the Moderbach near Mouterhouse
  - coordinates: 48°58′57″N 7°23′03″E
  - elevation: ca. 285 m
- Mouth
  - location: near Schweighouse-sur-Moder into the Moder
  - coordinates: 48°49′25″N 7°44′25″E
  - elevation: ca. 145 m
- Length: 43 km (27 mi)
- Basin size: 338.7 km^{2} (130.8 mi^{2})
- Discharge
  - location: mouth
  - average: 3.28 m^{3}/s (116 cu ft/s)

Basin features
- Progression: Moder→ Rhine→ North Sea
- Tributaries
  - left: Falkensteinerbach

The Zinsel du Nord (German: Nördliche Zinsel, also Moderbach), also called the North Zinsel or Northern Zinsel in English, is a left tributary of the river Moder, which is 43 kilometres (27 mi) long from the source of the Moderbach stream. The Zinsel du Nord and its tributaries drain northwest in the North Vosges, especially in the Pays de Bitche in the east of the department of Moselle. Its catchment area is 339 square kilometres (131 mi^{2}).

== Course ==
The Northern Zinsel begins at a height of about 225 metres above sea level at the confluence of the Breidenbach and Moderbach, in the village of Mouterhouse. Whilst the Breidenbach rises at the Breitenstein aka Pierre des douze Apôtres near Goetzenbruck, the source of the Moderbach is at the Wasserfelsen (fr. Cascade des Ondines), on the eastern edge of Lemberg. Its largest tributary is the Falkensteinerbach, which joins it at Uttenhofen from the left.

The Northern Zinsel then flows through a very wide valley, surrounded by the endless Mouterhouse State Forest, in a south-easterly direction towards the Schmalenthal Pond aka Baerenthal Pond and the popular holiday resort of the same name. At its exit from the Northern Vosges into the Upper Rhine Plain is the Lower Alsatian village of Zinswiller. Near Gumbrechtshoffen it leaves the Northern Vosges Regional Nature Park and, from Uttenhoffen, follows the N 62 road and the Niederbronn-les-Bains – Haguenau railway line, crossing the Hagenau Forest from Mertzwiller.

Near Schweighouse-sur-Moder in the canton of Haguenau it empties into the Moder in the middle of an industrial estate.

== History ==
In 1196 the river was called the Cinzele. Other references are thought by Albrecht Greule to relate to the Southern Zinsel or the gunsinus rivus, a stream that has not been clearly identified, and which appear in old boundary descriptions recorded by Maursmünster Abbey.

In the 19th century, there was a lot of iron industry along the Northern Zinsel, that were owned by the De Dietrich industrial dynasty. This led to heavy deforestation which has since been recovered.
