= Missy-lès-Pierrepont =

- Commune
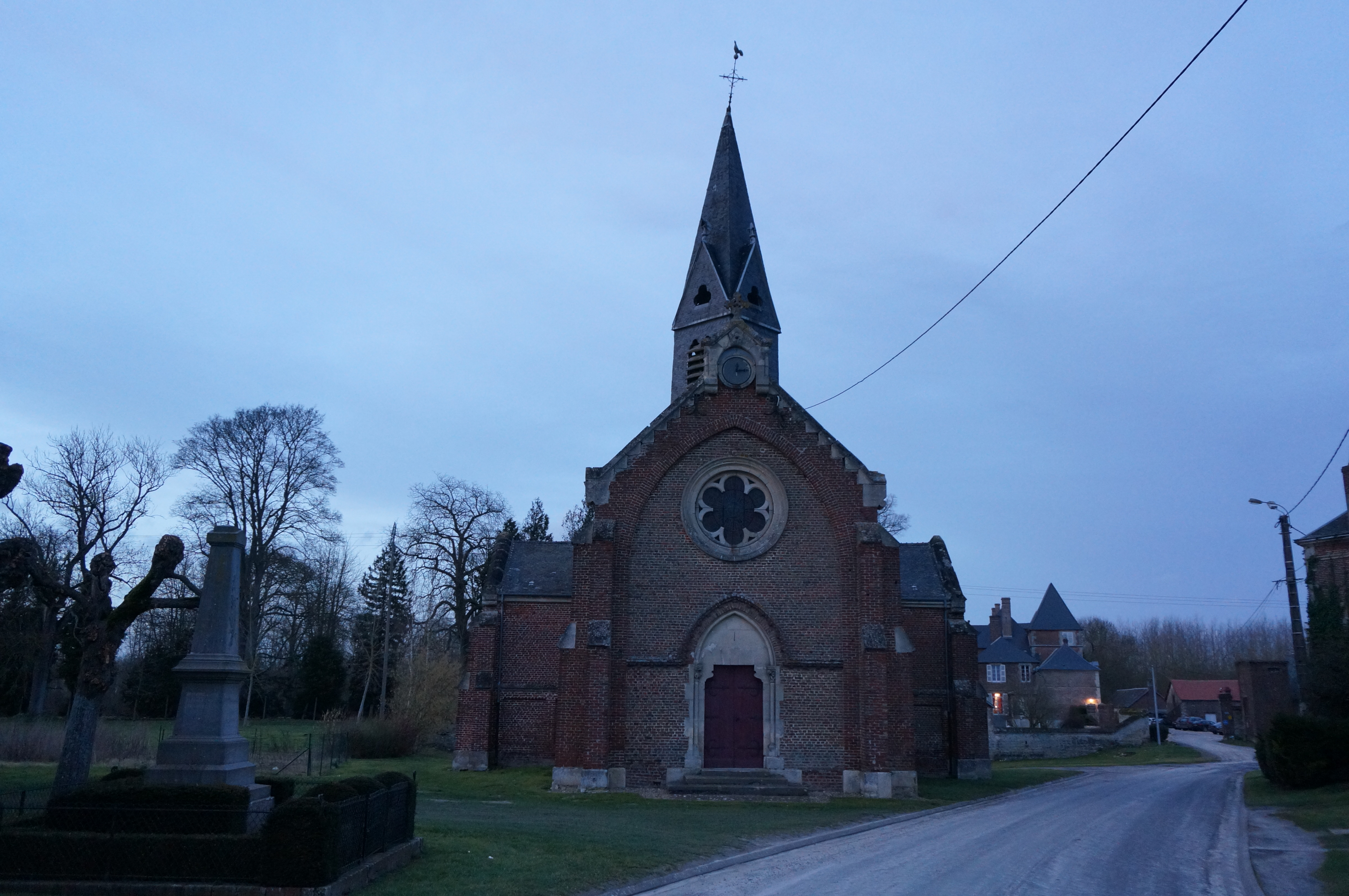
- The church of Missy-lès-Pierrepont
- Location of Missy-lès-Pierrepont
- Location within France Location within Hauts-de-France
- Coordinates: 49°38′00″N 3°47′14″E
- Country: France
- Region: Hauts-de-France
- Department: Aisne
- Arrondissement: Laon
- Canton: Villeneuve-sur-Aisne
- Intercommunality: Champagne Picarde

Government
  - Mayor (2026–32): Betty Bas
- Area^{1}: 6.6 km^{2} (2.5 sq mi)
- Elevation: 70 m (230 ft)
- Highest elevation: 91 m (299 ft)
- Lowest elevation: 68 m (223 ft)
- Population (2023): 107
  - Density: 16/km^{2} (42/sq mi)
- Time zone: UTC+01:00 (CET)
  - Summer (DST): UTC+02:00 (CEST)
- INSEE/Postal code: 02486 /02350
- ^{1} French Land Register data, which excludes lakes, ponds, glaciers > 1 km^{2} (0.386 sq mi or 247 acres) and river estuaries.

Missy-lès-Pierrepont (French pronunciation: [misi lɛ pjɛʁpɔ̃], literally Missy near Pierrepont) is a commune in the Aisne department in Hauts-de-France in northern France.

== Population ==
Historical population
Year	Pop.	±% p.a.
1968	161	—
1975	120	−4.11%
1982	116	−0.48%
1990	89	−3.26%
1999	95	+0.73%
2007	101	+0.77%
2012	109	+1.54%
2017	108	−0.18%
2023	107	−0.15%
Source: INSEE

== See also ==
- Communes of the Aisne department
