= Montaigu, Aisne =

Montaigu
- Commune
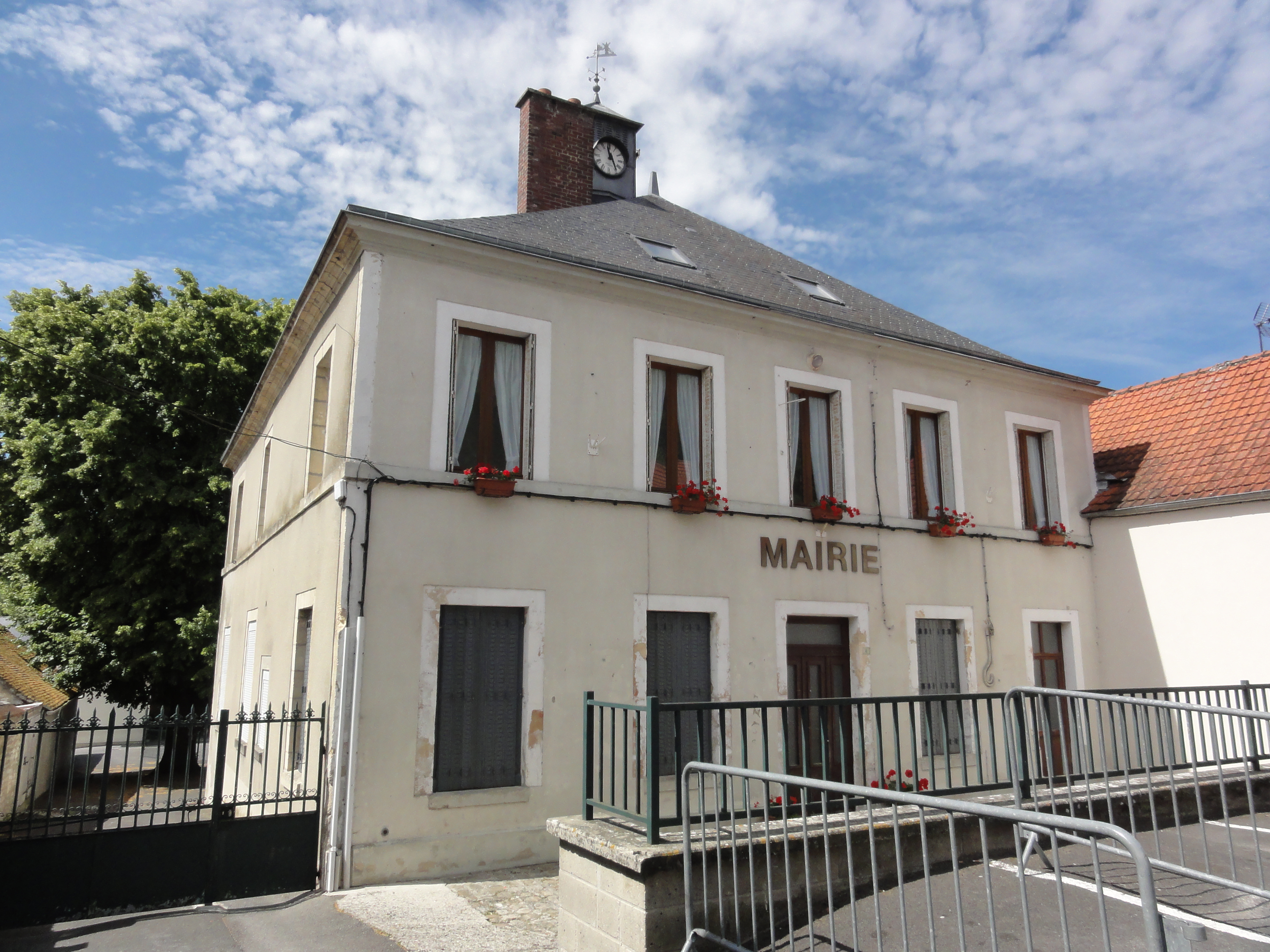
- The town hall of Montaigu

- Coat of arms
- Location of Montaigu
- Location within France Location within Hauts-de-France
- Coordinates: 49°32′11″N 3°49′50″E
- Country: France
- Region: Hauts-de-France
- Department: Aisne
- Arrondissement: Laon
- Canton: Villeneuve-sur-Aisne
- Intercommunality: Champagne Picarde

Government
  - Mayor (2026–32): Monique De Brouwer
- Area^{1}: 23.51 km^{2} (9.08 sq mi)
- Elevation: 93 m (305 ft)
- Highest elevation: 199 m (653 ft)
- Lowest elevation: 71 m (233 ft)
- Population (2023): 766
  - Density: 32.6/km^{2} (84.4/sq mi)
- Time zone: UTC+01:00 (CET)
  - Summer (DST): UTC+02:00 (CEST)
- INSEE/Postal code: 02498 /02820
- ^{1} French Land Register data, which excludes lakes, ponds, glaciers > 1 km^{2} (0.386 sq mi or 247 acres) and river estuaries.

Montaigu (French pronunciation: [mɔ̃tɛgy]) is a commune in the Aisne department in Hauts-de-France in northern France.

== Population ==
Historical population
Year	Pop.	±% p.a.
1968	557	—
1975	589	+0.80%
1982	650	+1.42%
1990	673	+0.44%
1999	671	−0.03%
2007	698	+0.49%
2012	749	+1.42%
2017	761	+0.32%
2023	766	+0.11%
Source: INSEE

== See also ==
- Communes of the Aisne department
