= Lambach HL.II =

HL.2
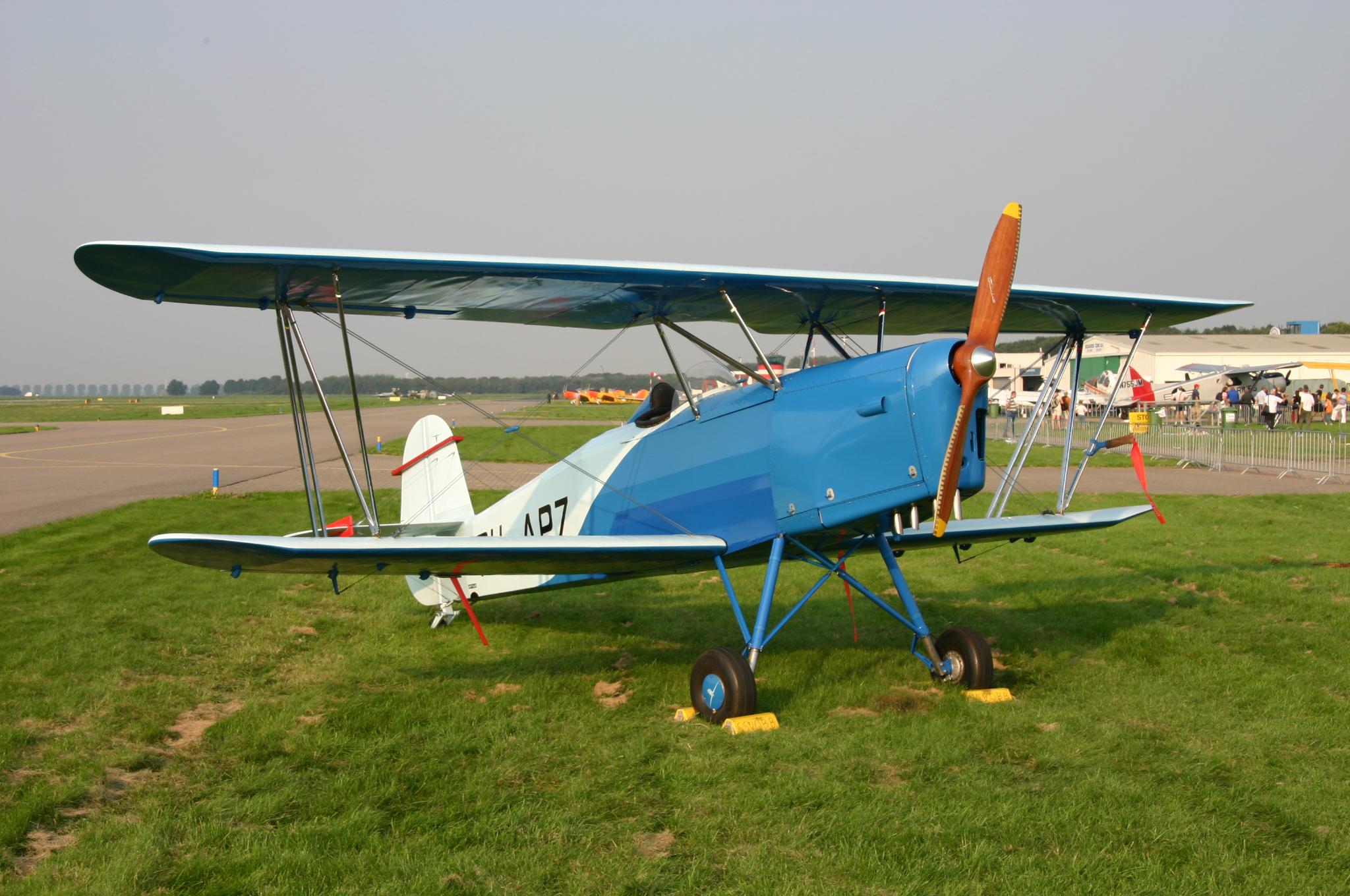
- HL.II replica, bearing the original's PH-APZ registration

General information
- Type: Single seat aerobatic aircraft
- National origin: Netherlands
- Manufacturer: Lambach Aircraft
- Number built: 2 (1 original, 1 replica)

History
- First flight: 4 May 1937

The Lambach HL.II was a single seat aerobatic biplane designed and built in the Netherlands to provide Dutch pilots in a local, annual competition with their own machine. It proved no match for contemporary Germany aircraft.

== Design and development ==
There were no Dutch aircraft competing in the North Dutch Flying Club's first international aerobatics competition held in Eelde in the spring of 1936; from a field of German and Dutch pilots, the best placed Dutchman came second, flying a British Tiger Moth. Hugo Lambach, who had already designed and helped build the Lambach HL.I at the Delft Student Aeroclub, was asked to produce an indigenous competitor. In January 1937 he set up a factory trading as Lambach Aircraft at Voorburg and by May the HL.II was designed and built, making its first flight on 4 May flown by Hein Schmidt Crans, the pilot who had come second in 1936.

The HL.II is a conventionally laid out biplane with single bay wings of constant chord and rounded tips. These are mounted without stagger or sweep, braced with N-form interplane struts and a pair of similar form cabane struts. There are ailerons on both planes, externally connected. The fin and rudder are rounded, the latter extending to the keel. The tailplane is mounted on top of the fuselage and the elevators have a cut-out for rudder movement.

The HL.II is powered by a 130 hp (97 kW) de Havilland Gipsy four cylinder inverted inline engine driving a two blade propeller. Its lower fuselage is flat sided, the upper with rounded decking. Its cockpit, with a faired headrest, is placed just behind the trailing edge, where there is a round cut-out for enhanced visibility. The HL.II has a fixed conventional undercarriage, with mainwheels on crossed axles supported by V-struts and with a tailwheel.

== Operational history ==
There was little time to practice for the 1937 aerobatic event and Hein Schmidt Crans in the HL.II, faced with superior German aircraft, could only manage third place. Things went even worse in 1938, with the Dutch machine in last place, overwhelmed by the Germans. With war approaching, there was no competition in 1939 and on 10 May 1940 the sole HL.II was destroyed at Ypenburg by German bombs.

Lambach Aircraft had an even shorter life; it closed within the year, as other aircraft manufacturers focused on military production.

A replica built by students of the Technical University of Delft flew in 1995 but was soon grounded by fatigue cracks in the wing roots. It is now (2017) at the Aviodrome, Lelystad Airport, being restored to flying condition.

== Specifications ==
Data from De Lambach HL II

General characteristics

- Crew: One
- Length: 6.70 m (22 ft 0 in)
- Upper wingspan: 8.00 m (26 ft 3 in)
- Lower wingspan: 7.00 m (23 ft 0 in)
- Height: 2.40 m (7 ft 10 in)
- Wing area: 16.7 m^{2} (180 sq ft)
- Empty weight: 468 kg (1,032 lb)
- Max takeoff weight: 620 kg (1,367 lb)
- Powerplant: 1 × de Havilland Gipsy Major 4-cylinder inverted air-cooled inline engine, 97 kW (130 hp)
- Propellers: 2-bladed

Performance

- Maximum speed: 215 km/h (134 mph, 116 kn)
- Cruise speed: 185 km/h (115 mph, 100 kn)
- Never exceed speed: 250 km/h (160 mph, 130 kn)
- g limits: +6, -3
