= Baerenthal =

- Commune
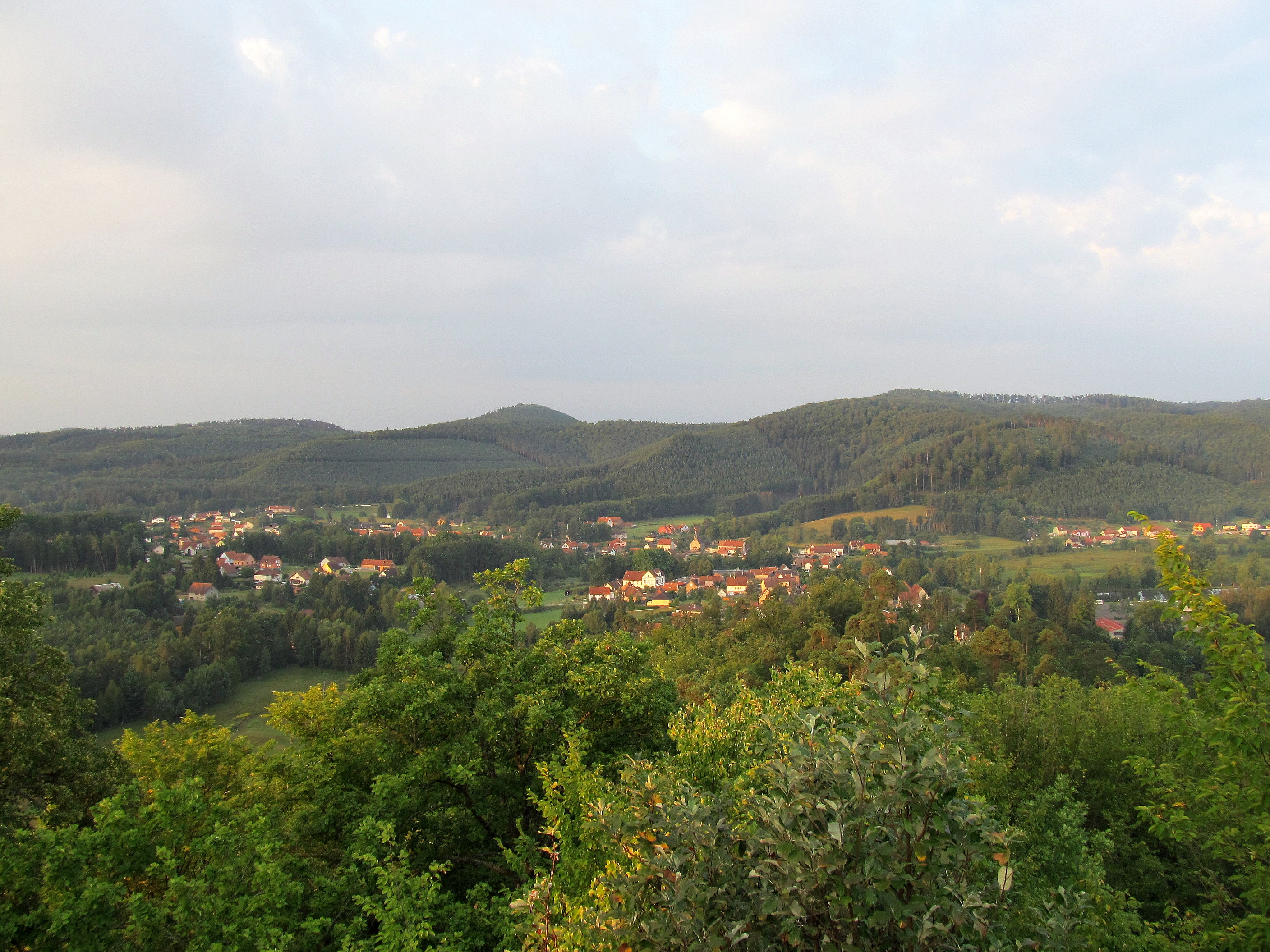
- View from Ramstein castle

- Coat of arms
- Location of Baerenthal
- Location within France Location within Grand Est
- Coordinates: 48°58′32″N 7°31′06″E
- Country: France
- Region: Grand Est
- Department: Moselle
- Arrondissement: Sarreguemines
- Canton: Bitche
- Intercommunality: CC du Pays de Bitche

Government
  - Mayor (2020–2026): Serge Weil
- Area^{1}: 39.19 km^{2} (15.13 sq mi)
- Elevation: 210 m (690 ft)
- Highest elevation: 473 m (1,552 ft)
- Lowest elevation: 190 m (620 ft)
- Population (2023): 734
  - Density: 18.7/km^{2} (48.5/sq mi)
- Time zone: UTC+01:00 (CET)
  - Summer (DST): UTC+02:00 (CEST)
- INSEE/Postal code: 57046 /57230
- ^{1} French Land Register data, which excludes lakes, ponds, glaciers > 1 km^{2} (0.386 sq mi or 247 acres) and river estuaries.

Baerenthal (French pronunciation: [bɛʁəntal]; German: Bärental; Lorraine Franconian: Bäredal) is a commune in the Moselle department of the Grand Est administrative region in north-eastern France.

The village belongs to the Pays de Bitche and to the Northern Vosges Regional Nature Park.

== Geography ==
The village is located in heavily wooded country, 15 kilometres from Bitche and 12 kilometres from Niederbronn, at the south-eastern border of the canton of Bitche. It has a population of 750 and is located at an altitude of 240 meters, in the lush green valley of the northern Zinsel river.

== History ==
When founded, during the age of the franc compté (feudalist Frankish counts) of the eighth to tenth centuries, Baerenthal was located in Nordgau, in Alsace. It was a part, during the Carolingian era, of the bishopric of Strasbourg, just at the border with the bishopric of Metz.

The medieval period of the village is very rich thanks to the presence of the châteaux of Château de Ramstein and Château de Grand-Arnsberg on its land. The nobles of Ramstein were cited for the first time in a document dated 22 October 1291. The village of Baerenthal was mentioned later in 1318, under the name Berendal, in the valley of Bero. Regarding secular power, Baerenthal was under the rule of Ramstein, and later, starting in 1355, under that of Falkenstein. After this began the sinister period of pillaging by robber-knights (Raubritter) for the 'Berebdal unter Ramenstein' (the rock of the ravens).

By an act of sale dated 3 September 1467, Count Louis V of Lichtenberg became the owner of the southern half of the village as well as the chateau of Grand-Arnsberg and in 1569 the counts of Hanau-Lichtenberg became the owners of the whole village. The names of several regions of Baerenthal date back to this time:

- Reinhardshof, from the name of burgrave Johann-Reinhardt
- Fischerhof, where fishermen lived
- Rosselhof, where the noblemen's stables were located
- Frohnacker (field of labor), where a great farm near the nobles' fields was located

Starting from 1480, Berendal passed through the hands of the counts of Hanau-Lichtenberg and followed their fate. In 1606 milestones were placed which separated the duchy of Lorraine and the county of Hanau-Lichtenberg from the hamlet of Melch to that of Bannstein. In 1648, Baerenthal was a part of the baillage of Lemberg, near the Pirmasens dans le Palatinat, in the landgraviate of Hesse-Darmstadt. Its landgrave, Louis VIII, was the son-in-law of count Johann-Reinhardt of Hanau-Lichtenberg and became his heir in 1786. In 1793, Baerenthal, as well as the neighboring territory of Philippsbourg in the canton of Bitche, were detached from Alsace and became part of the district of the Moselle. It was the Convention that made this decision during the French Revolution.

In the eighteenth century, the northern Zinsel river was used to supply the factories and ironworks that brought work and life in the valley. In 1745, the first factory was built in Baerenthal. It was an armament factory (producing side arms) and grew rapidly. A second factory was built to transform the ore coming from Franche-Comté into cast iron and steel. With the creation in 1807 of a steel mill, a cast-ironworks and sheetworks factories, industry grew along the length of the Zinselbach. This activity reached a peak in the middle of the nineteenth century, but slowed down at the beginning of the twentieth century. In 1932 the last factory closed. The rest-stop in the village was taken by the Chaiserie Lorraine and destroyed during the Second World War. Reconstructed and again devoted to steel work, mechanics/mechanics workshops were replaced by a factory producing tableware.

Following the imperial ordinance of 2 September 1915, the name of the village was Germanized to Bärenthal and kept this name until the return of France in 1918. From 1940 to 1944, it was Germanized again, this time to Bärental bei Bitsch.

Classified as a Station de Cure d'air (a place for people to rest and heal), Baerenthal is an important tourist center of the northern Vosges. The village has been classified as a Station verte since 1987.

== Economy ==
The Barenthal company designs and produces solid steel tableware and silver-coated metal. In 2005, it was the second greatest producer of French tableware.

== Religion ==
=== Catholic ===
In the Middle Ages, Baerenthal was part of the parish of Obersteinbach, of the archbishopric of Haut-Haguenau in the diocese of Strasbourg. In 1570, count Philippe IV of Hanau-Lichtenberg brought the Reformation to the village and the Catholic religion was consequently suppressed. This explains the absence of crosses by the roads in and around Baerenthal, a characteristic of Catholic regions. For the few Catholics who joined this community, the territory became a part of the bishopric of Metz in 1802 and was annexed to the parish of Mouterhouse. The Chapel of the Immaculate Conception was constructed in 1885 in the northern part of the village.

=== Protestant ===
After the village embraced the Reformation, the church changed to Protestantism. The Protestant church was restored in 1630. The village has been a Protestant district since 1739.

== Population ==
Historical population
Year	Pop.	±% p.a.
1968	735	—
1975	754	+0.37%
1982	694	−1.18%
1990	723	+0.51%
1999	702	−0.33%
2007	698	−0.07%
2012	780	+2.25%
2017	778	−0.05%
2023	734	−0.97%
Source: INSEE

== Neighboring communes ==
Neighboring communes, which consist of only a few houses, are relatively numerous:

- Betteli from 1840
- Breitthal from 1841

The region at the beginning of the 20th century:

- Daxhof, bringing the nobility of Falkenstein, and constructed around 1740.
- Eulenkopf around 1845
- Fischerhof at the beginning of the 17th century
- Frohnacker probably after 1770
- Thalhäusen around the end of the 18th century
- Schmealenthal from the beginning of the 19th century
- Untermühlthal around 1720

In 1150, the landgrave Dietrich ceded the abbey of Neuweiler which gave its fief to the abbey of Neubourg. The village of Mühlenbach, which belonged to the nobility of Gross-Arnsburg, and then to that of Falkenstein, was finally reunited with the village of Lemberg in 1332. The assorted hamlets of Leimenthalerhof, Rothenbronnerhof, Sasselbach, Scharfeneckerhof and Wiesenlagerhof were mentioned in 1798. The unique house which was the basis of the small village of Kroterwasen was bought by the Administration of Waters and Forests and, in 1887, was transformed to a Forestry House, taking the name of Schwarzenberg.

== Sights ==
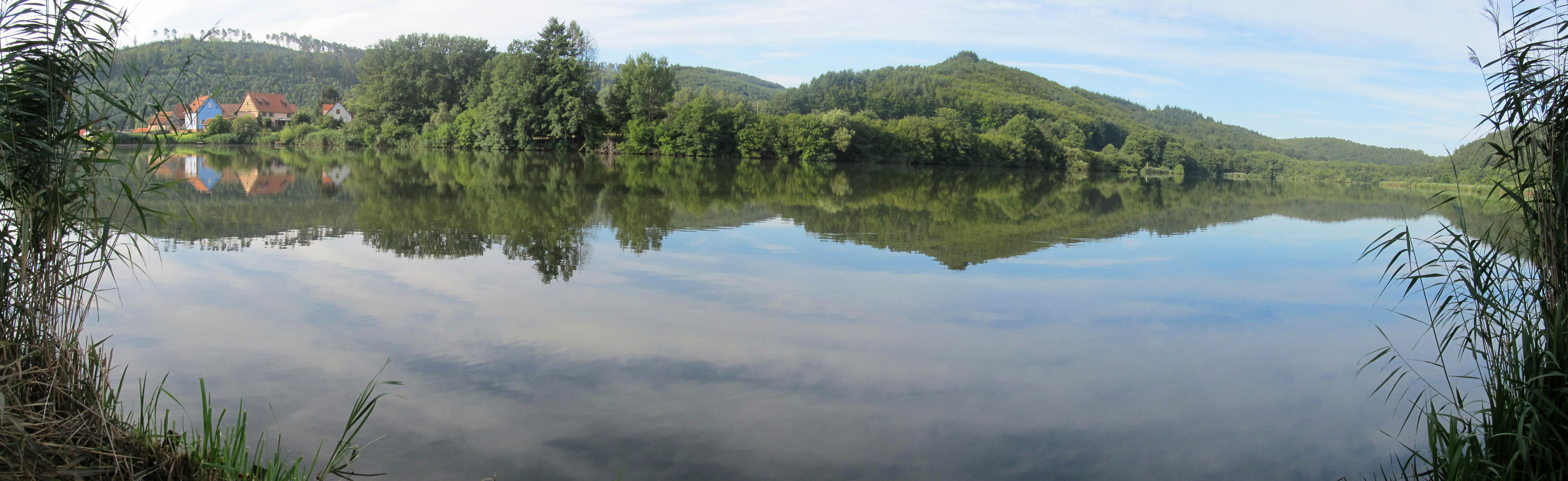
The grand étang, a popular place for bird-watching activities

- Château de Grand-Arnsberg, constructed at the beginning of the 12th century to protect the imperial city of Haguenau.
- Château de Ramstein, constructed in the 13th century by the Falkenstein nobility.
- the church of Saint Catherine, transformed into a Protestant church in 1571 and reconstructed in the 17th century.
- the marker/milestone near Schmalenthal, dated from 1605. Delimits the old borders of the county of Bitche.
- The calvary (in French, a small figurine of Christ on the cross) near Frohnacker, dated from 1790.
- The tomb of Philippe Hirtz, an ironworker from Mouterhouse, dated from 1868.
- the Chapel of the Immaculate Conception, built at the end of the 19th century, which is a place of pilgrimage every May.
- The bird observation post, the best place to discover the fauna of the Northern Vosges.

Situated on the main road, a farm is composed of two buildings: the home, gabled on the road, dated 1770 on the door of the cellar, and the farm itself, dated 1753, developed in breadth behind the courtyard. Exceptional in the Pays de Bitche, the farm resembles the Alsatian building style. One can see this by the separation between buildings and the farm and by the porch-roof superimposed on the main/front face of the building. The difference to the Alsatian style is that the pan-de-bois is relegated in the second part (that is, the foundations), while the house is constructed with stone and a mix of roughcast lime (pebbles were added in the mix and used to increase the surface area of the house, to increase the rate of evaporation).

== Coat of arms ==
The arms of this village are: "a black bear, passant silver, chapé-ployé of gold to the star of dexter gules". These are the arms of the Ramstein family, the nobles of the village in the Middle Ages, who took their name from the old château of Ramstein. The bear on the arms is taken from the name of the community, namely, the valley of bears: Bären-tal, in German.

== Personalities ==
- Jean-Guillaume Goldenberg (1778–1858), overseer of the ironworks

== See also ==
- Communes of the Moselle department
- Baerenthal (fr)
