= Loutzviller =

- Commune
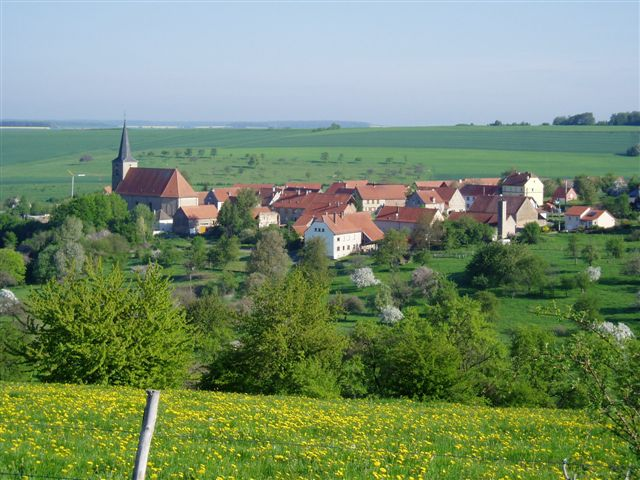
- A general view of Loutzviller

- Coat of arms
- Location of Loutzviller
- Location within France Location within Grand Est
- Coordinates: 49°08′52″N 7°23′00″E
- Country: France
- Region: Grand Est
- Department: Moselle
- Arrondissement: Sarreguemines
- Canton: Bitche
- Intercommunality: CC du Pays de Bitche

Government
  - Mayor (2020–2026): Laurent Hölter
- Area^{1}: 3.22 km^{2} (1.24 sq mi)
- Elevation: 290 m (950 ft)
- Highest elevation: 357 m (1,171 ft)
- Lowest elevation: 240 m (790 ft)
- Population (2023): 149
  - Density: 46.3/km^{2} (120/sq mi)
- Time zone: UTC+01:00 (CET)
  - Summer (DST): UTC+02:00 (CEST)
- INSEE/Postal code: 57421 /57720
- ^{1} French Land Register data, which excludes lakes, ponds, glaciers > 1 km^{2} (0.386 sq mi or 247 acres) and river estuaries.

Loutzviller (French pronunciation: [lutsvilɛʁ]; German: Lutzweiler; Lorraine Franconian: Lutzwiller) is a commune in the Moselle department of the Grand Est administrative region in north-eastern France.

The village belongs to the Pays de Bitche and to the Northern Vosges Regional Nature Park.

== See also ==
- Communes of the Moselle department
