= Loper Bach =

River in Germany

Location
- Country: Germany
- States: North Rhine-Westphalia

Physical characteristics
- Mouth
  - location: Agger
  - coordinates: 50.9951°N 7.4991°E

Basin features
- Progression: Agger→ Sieg→ Rhine→ North Sea

Loper Bach is a small river of North Rhine-Westphalia, Germany. It is 3.1 km long and a right tributary of the Agger.

== See also ==
- List of rivers of North Rhine-Westphalia
