= Château du Falkenstein =

Ruined castle in Grand Est, France

Coordinates: 49°00′17″N 7°33′56″E

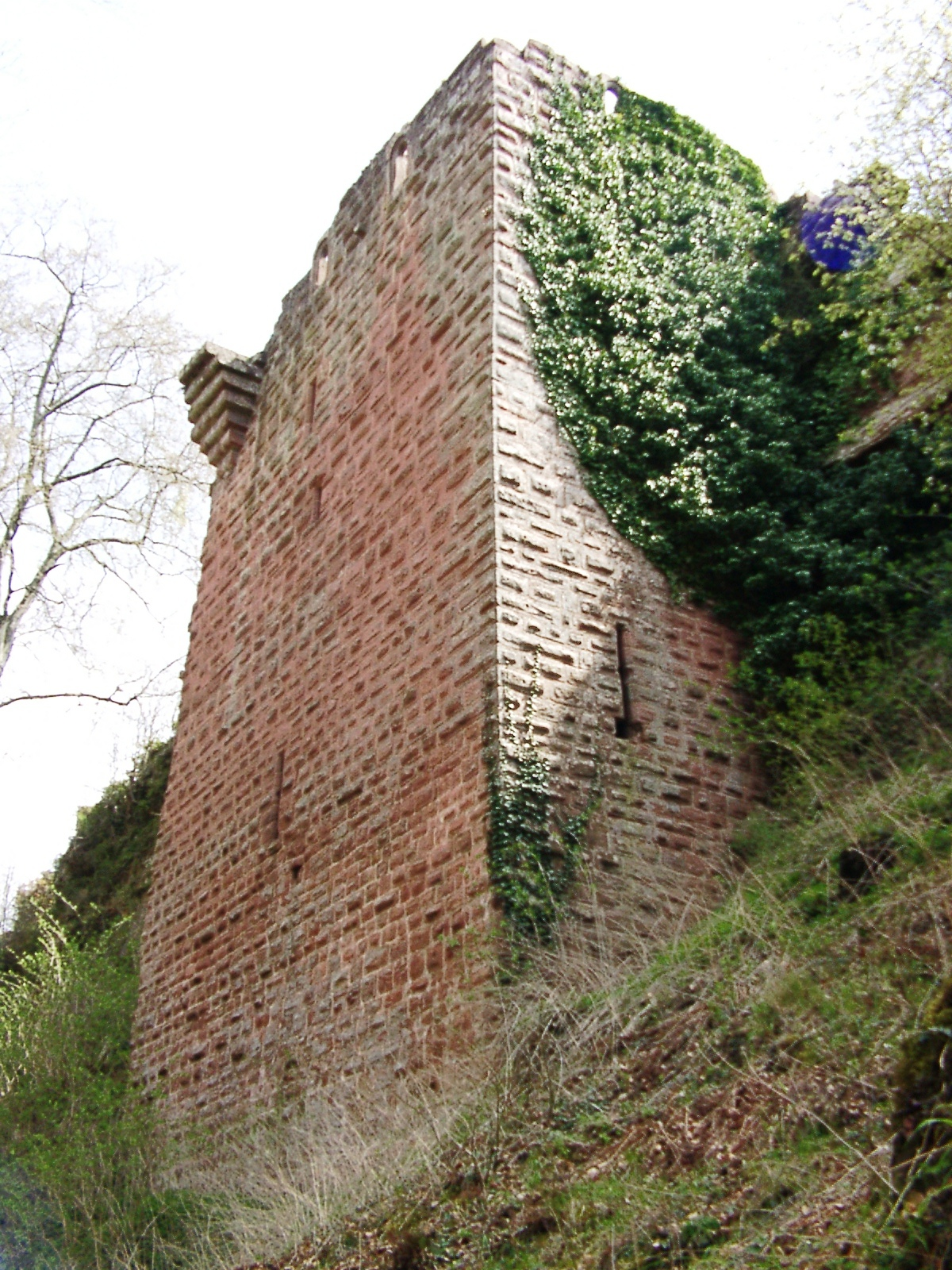
Falkenstein Castle's tower

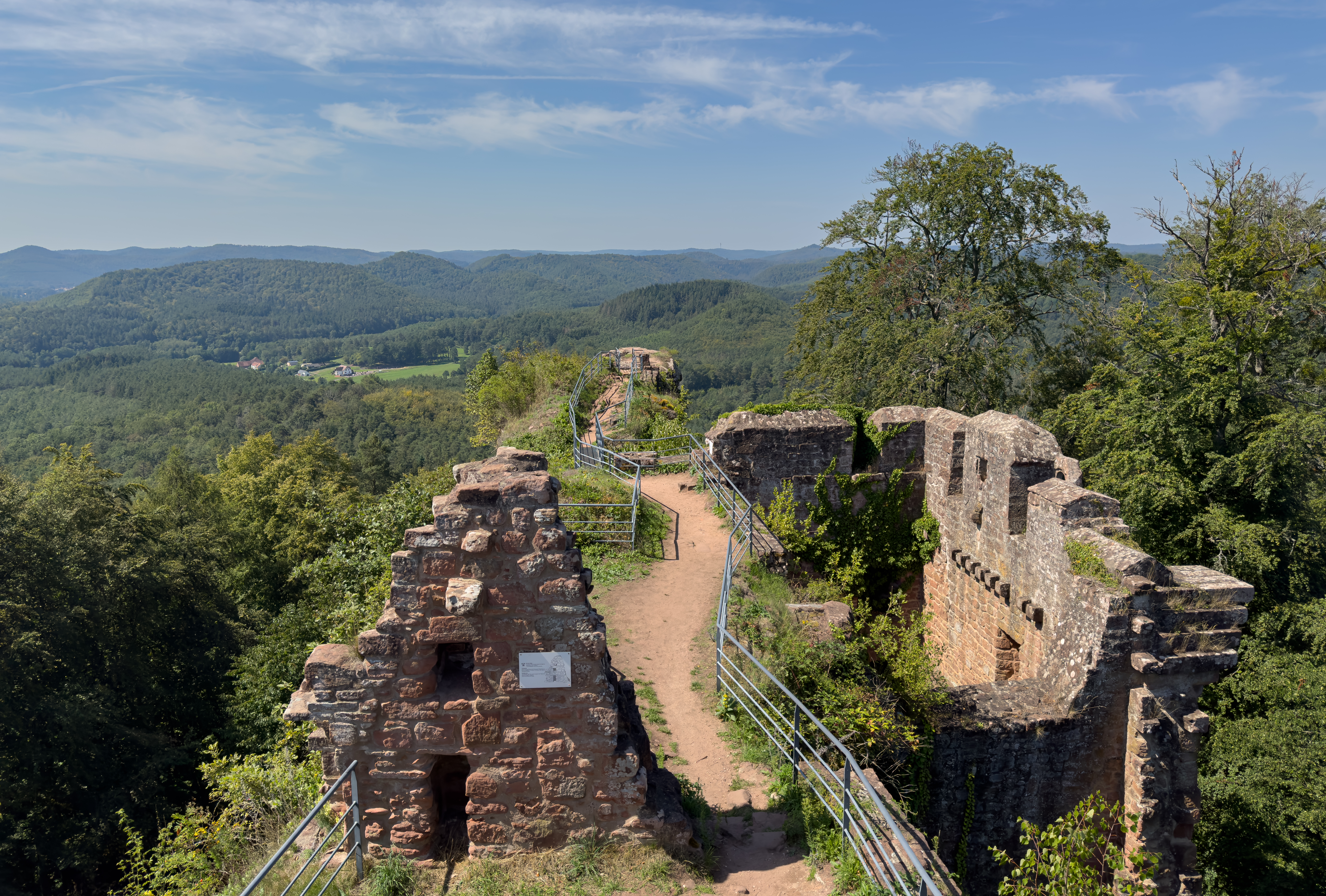
View from the top of Château du Falkenstein

The château du Falkenstein or Falkenstein Castle (German: Burg Falkenstein, literally "falconstone's castle") is a ruined castle in the commune of Philippsbourg in the Moselle département of France, at the heart of the Parc naturel régional des Vosges du Nord. This semi-troglodyte castle dominates the Zinsel valley.

== History ==
The castle, built by Count Peter of Lützelburg, is mentioned for the first time in 1127. It was intended to protect the possessions of the Count in the Forêt Sainte (Holy Forest) of Haguenau.

In 1150, Renaud, son of Peter, died without heir. The castle was therefore shared between Folmar of Sarrewerden and the Hohenstaufen family. Jacob of Falkenstein appears as a witness in a charter signed at Haguenau in 1205 and, in 1316, Gottfried, Conrad, Heinrich and Jacob of Falkenstein made peace with the city of Strasbourg. A paix castrale (castle peace) was signed in 1335, dividing the castle in three shares along the transverse walls.

In 1419, Jacob of Finstingen made himself Lord of Falkenstein seeing that he was the occupier on behalf of the Sarrewerdens. In 1474 Wilhelm of Falkenstein died, whereupon his sons Godfrey, Ortlieb and William inherited the castle and made an agreement to divide the property among themselves, agreeing that no part could be ceded, even to another member of the family, without the consent of the other shareholders. The shareholder in residence in 1479 attempted to sell the castle to the counts of Zweibrücken-Bitsch, and in 1482 a conflict blew up over non-respect of the agreement between the members of the family. When the dispute was finally settled in 1487, with the castle in the hands of Wilhelm of Falkenstein, he dedicated a new chapel in the castle.

The Falkensteins were sole masters of the castle in 1515 and the modernisation begun by Balthasar was continued by his son. In 1564, Philipp IV (1538-1590), Count of Hanau-Lichtenberg, bought the castle from Balthasar's children and grandchildren and, some months later, it was completely destroyed by fire and never rebuilt.

In 1570, a part of the ruined castle was still inhabited by a forester employed by the Count of Hanau-Lichtenberg. Between 1570 and 1605, a conflict erupted between the Hanau-Lichtenbergs and the Duchy of Lorraine, at the end of which the Falkensteins returned to Hanau-Lichtenberg in 1606.

In 1623, the castle was ruined by the troops of Ernst von Mansfeld during the Thirty Years' War, to such an extent that the foresters could no longer live there. The final destruction of the castle was carried out by French troops.

In 1981, the Vosges Club (club vosgien) in Strasbourg placed a marker at the castle summit showing the altitude and directions to nearby land features.

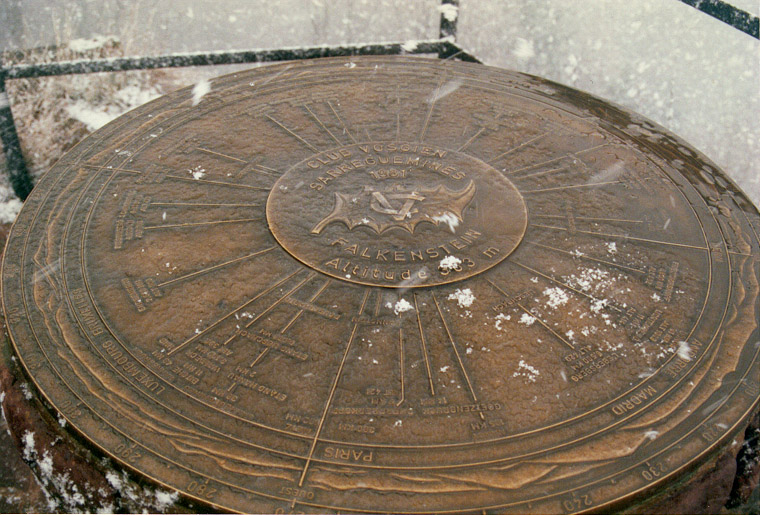
Marker at the top of Falkenstein placed by the Club vosgien, Strasbourg

== The structure ==
The castle's sandstone has been shaped by wind and bad weather.

Of note are the entrance, the remains of the keep, the cave rooms and the well tower, which had three functions: to protect the well, to defend the surrounding area and, on the top floor, to provide habitation. Nearby are the ruins of the château de Helfenstein.

The ruins, property of the state, have been classified since 1930 as a monument historique by the French Ministry of Culture. Access was prohibited from 1999 to 2013.

== See also ==
- List of castles in France
