= Philippsbourg =

- Commune
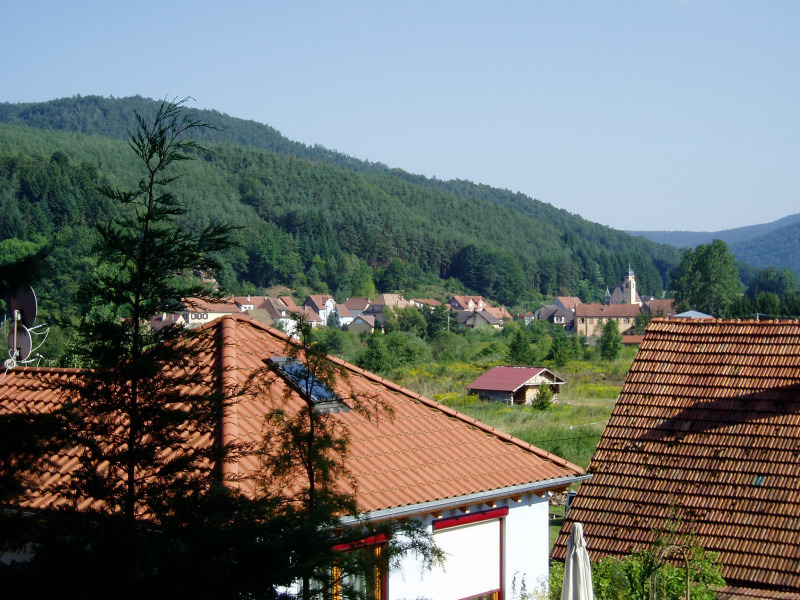
- View of the village and the valley of the Falkensteinerbach

- Coat of arms
- Location of Philippsbourg
- Location within France Location within Grand Est
- Coordinates: 48°59′N 7°34′E
- Country: France
- Region: Grand Est
- Department: Moselle
- Arrondissement: Sarreguemines
- Canton: Bitche
- Intercommunality: CC du Pays de Bitche

Government
  - Mayor (2020–2026): Mathieu Muller
- Area^{1}: 23.71 km^{2} (9.15 sq mi)
- Highest elevation: 510 m (1,670 ft)
- Lowest elevation: 205 m (673 ft)
- Population (2023): 613
  - Density: 25.9/km^{2} (67.0/sq mi)
- Time zone: UTC+01:00 (CET)
  - Summer (DST): UTC+02:00 (CEST)
- INSEE/Postal code: 57541 /57230
- ^{1} French Land Register data, which excludes lakes, ponds, glaciers > 1 km^{2} (0.386 sq mi or 247 acres) and river estuaries.

Philippsbourg (French: [filipsbuʁ]; German: Philippsburg [ˈfɪlɪpsbʊʁk]; Lorraine Franconian: Phillipsburch; Alsatian: Phillipsbueri) is a commune in the department of Moselle, administrative region of Grand Est, northeastern France.

The village belongs to the Pays de Bitche and to the Northern Vosges Regional Nature Park.

== Sites and monuments ==
- Château du Falkenstein, 12th-century ruined castle, built for surveillance of the Zinsel valley
- Château de Rothenbourg, castle ruins dating from the 9th century
- Château de Helfenstein, ruins of a castle already destroyed in 1437

== See also ==
- Communes of the Moselle department
