= Goetzenbruck =

- Commune
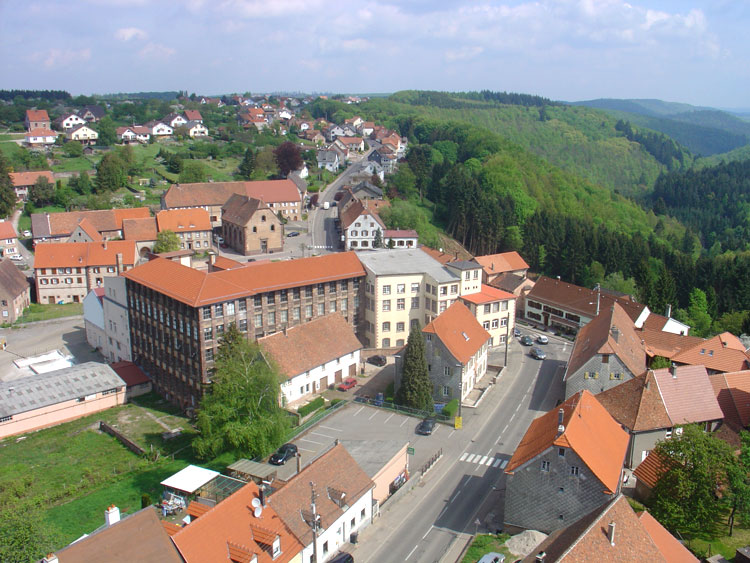
- A general view of Goetzenbruck

- Coat of arms
- Location of Goetzenbruck
- Location within France Location within Grand Est
- Coordinates: 48°58′41″N 7°22′50″E
- Country: France
- Region: Grand Est
- Department: Moselle
- Arrondissement: Sarreguemines
- Canton: Bitche
- Intercommunality: Pays de Bitche

Government
  - Mayor (2020–2026): Joël Romang
- Area^{1}: 8.12 km^{2} (3.14 sq mi)
- Elevation: 386 m (1,266 ft)
- Highest elevation: 432 m (1,417 ft)
- Lowest elevation: 260 m (850 ft)
- Population (2023): 1,484
  - Density: 183/km^{2} (473/sq mi)
- Time zone: UTC+01:00 (CET)
  - Summer (DST): UTC+02:00 (CEST)
- INSEE/Postal code: 57250 /57620
- ^{1} French Land Register data, which excludes lakes, ponds, glaciers > 1 km^{2} (0.386 sq mi or 247 acres) and river estuaries.

Goetzenbruck or Gœtzenbruck (French pronunciation: [ɡœtsənbʁyk]; German: Götzenbrück; Lorraine Franconian: Getzebrikk) is a commune in the Moselle department of the Grand Est administrative region in north-eastern France.

The village belongs to the Pays de Bitche and to the Northern Vosges Regional Nature Park. As of the 2013 France census, the village's population is 1,608. The inhabitants of the commune are known as Goetzenbruckois and Goetzenbruckoises.

The present municipality of Goetzenbruck was originally divided into three municipalities. They underwent several changes before the two remaining municipalities of Goetzenbruck and Sarreinsberg merged in 1947 (the latter had already merged with the third municipality, Althorn, back in 1837).

== See also ==
- Communes of the Moselle department
