= Ramstein Castle (Kordel) =

Castle ruins in the Kyll valley, Germany

Coordinates: 49°49′25.6″N 6°38′38.7″E

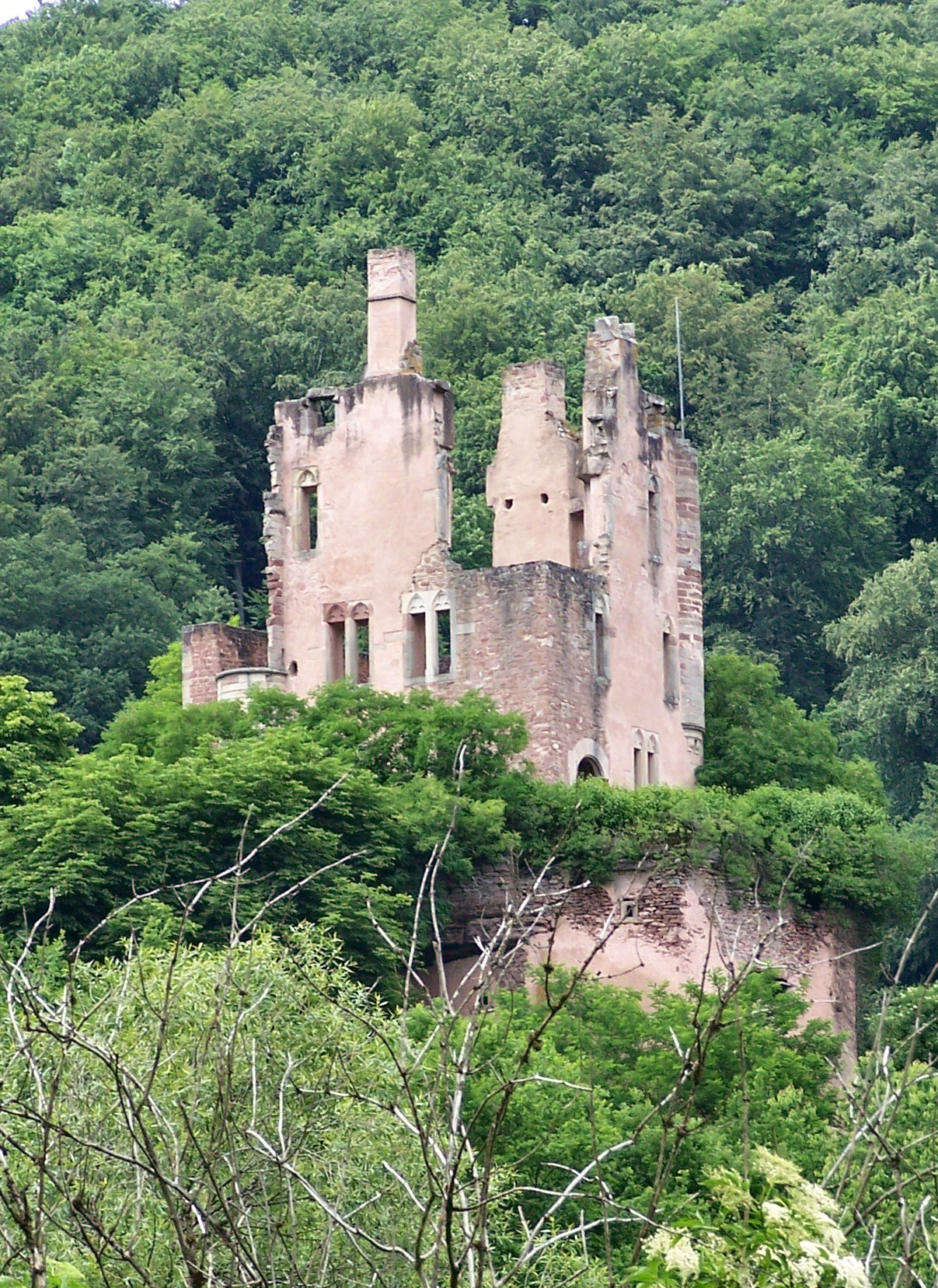
SE view of the castle ruins of Ramstein

The ruins of Ramstein Castle (German: Burg Ramstein) stand on a 182-metre-high, Bunter sandstone rock on the edge of the Meulenwald forest in the lower, steep-sided Kyll valley near Kordel in the German state of Rhineland-Palatinate. It stands 9 kilometres (5.6 mi) north of Trier and the same east of Luxembourg.

The hill castle was built in the early 14th century by the Archbishop of Trier, Diether of Nassau as the successor to a fortified manor farm. From then on, it was a fief castle of the Electorate of Trier which was enfeoffed (subleased) to electoral subjects and cathedral deans. During the War of the Palatine Succession, the castle was occupied by French troops and largely blown up in 1689. The great damage was not repaired. However, tall sections of curtain walls, elements of corner towers and almost of all the exterior and the stone staircases of its medieval tower house stand.

Three larger-footprint modern buildings including a hotel-restaurant are on the southern part of the east-facing promontory. The hotel's outdoor terrace overlooks the lightly or densely wooded valley, depending on direction views. Fields have likely long stood next to the near-bend of the river enabling a clear view to the impassably sheer hillside (on horseback) on the opposite bank and intervening north–south route.

== History ==
In the early 10th century, Archbishop Radbod of Trier had a fortified house (Latin: municiuncula) built on a rock near Kordel on the site of an older predecessor building (Latin: edificium) and pledged it around 926 to his vassal Vollmar for life. This manor house of an agricultural estate was the predecessor of the present Ramstein Castle and is referred to in the records as Runnesstein or Castrum Ruynstein. The present name of the site did not appear until around 1600.

Until the beginning of the 14th century there is no further record of the castle complex, because it was not until this time that Diether of Nassau, Archbishop of Trier began work on a castle here, whose construction lasted from 1300 to 1307. The castle was thus located on the Roman road from Trier to Andernach and not far from the old Roman road from Trier to Cologne. However, the castle had to be finished under Diether's successor, Baldwin of Luxemburg. The exact date of its completion not known, but it can be assumed that the building work was completed in 1317, because Baldwin sealed a deed at the castle that year. By 2 July 1310 he had transferred the still unfinished building to his confidant and teacher, John of Bruch (Johann de Bruaco) as a fiefdom. John was a cathedral dean in Trier, and the feudal treaty provided that, from now on, the respective holder of this office should always be the feoffee of Ramstein Castle. However, this provision was not complied with.

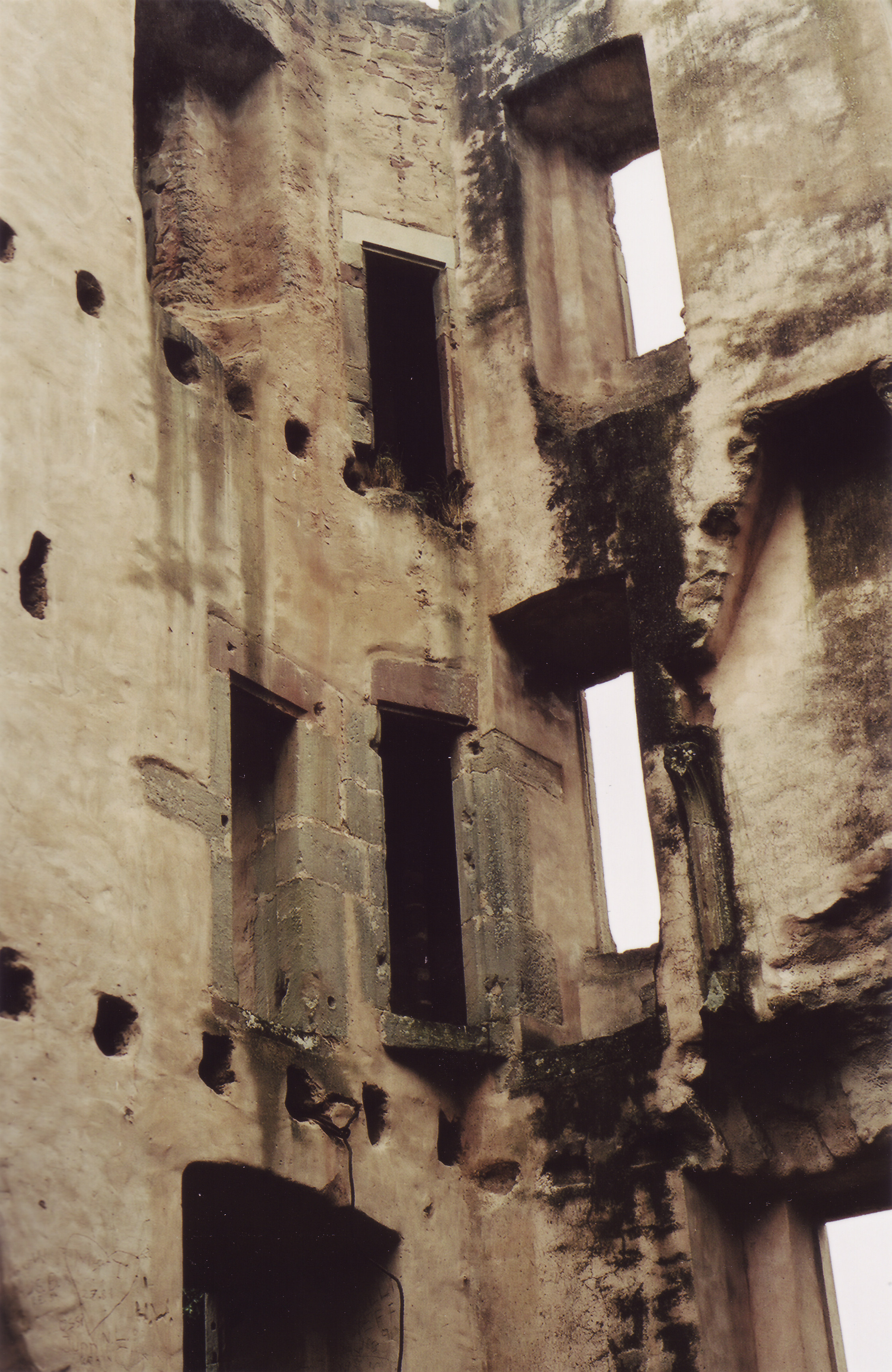
Walls of the tower house, interior view

The construction of the castle did not proceed without controversy. The knight, Arnold of Pittingen, a high Luxembourg nobleman and his representative, Vogt of Butzweiler, objected to the castle. He took his case to the Roman-German King, but Archbishop Baldwin was able to prove that Ramstein had been built on archiepiscopal land. Although records of the outcome of the trial have not survived, it is likely that Arnold lost his case 13 March 1310, as Baldwin continued the expansion of the castle soon afterwards.

In 1328, John of Fels (Johann von der Fels) and his wife, Jutta of Reuland, and Jutta's son from their first marriage, William of Manderscheid, each received half of Ramstein Castle as a fief. Baldwin, however, reserved right of access (Öffnungsrecht). Both the married couple and William pledged their shares several times during period that followed.

Baldwin's successor, Boemund II of Saarbrücken, transferred the castle on 1 July 1358 to his Palastmeister and Schöffenmeister, Johann Wolf, on the condition that he kept it in good order and employed enough guards to secure it. Only a short time later, Archbishop Cuno II of Falkenstein, enfeoffed Ramstein to the Abbess of Trier monastery of St. Irmina, Irmgard of Gymnich. From 1402 onwards, she was followed by the cathedral canon and chorbishop, Rupert of Hoheneck, as vassal. He, too, was required to maintain the castle and had to undertake to live there himself.

Some time after Rupert's death in 1417, Bernard of Orley occupied the castle, claiming ownership. As a result, Archbishop James I of Sierck had Ramstein Castle besieged. The dispute was finally settled by an arbitration court, which ruled in favour of the Archbishopric. The castle had suffered from the prolonged conflict and was in a bad condition. However, as the necessary financial resources were lacking, the damage was not repaired for the time being and the buildings gradually deteriorated. It was not until 28 May 1488 when Chorbishop Dietrich of Stein was given the lifetime fee of Ramstein that renovations took place. He had the castle rebuilt in accordance with the stipulations of the feudal agreement. After Dietrich's death in 1500, Henry of Hartenrode succeeded him that year: Archbishop John II of Baden appointed him the lifelong Burggrave of Schloss Rumstein.

In the 16th century, Archbishop and Prince-Elector Richard von Greiffenklau zu Vollrads probably lived in the castle himself. He solved the problem of water supply by building a clay pipe from a forest spring to the castle. The so-called "Brunnenstein", a memorial stone that commemorates this event, is still preserved today and is exhibited in the foyer of the inn situated within the castle grounds. The inscription reads:

RICHART GRIFFENCLAE VONN VOLRACZS ERTZBISCHOFF ZW TRIER VUN CHOERFVUERST HAIT MICH THOEN DRINGEN VSZ DIESSEM FILSCHEN SPRINGEN ANNO XV XXVII [(1527)]

The archbishop was succeeded by cathedral dean, Bartholomäus von der Leyen as owner from 1578 onwards. Afterwards, the estate went as a fiefdom to the cathedral deanery and remained so until it was seized as part of Napoleon's secularization drive at the beginning of the 19th century. However, the deans did not live in Ramstein Castle themselves, but had them managed and administered by a courtier (Hofmann; Lat.: villicus).

During the Franco-Dutch War, Ramstein ended up in French hands for a year from 1674 until it was liberated by imperial troops. Afterwards the castle was further fortified.

Warlike conflicts during the War of the Palatine Succession finally put an end to Ramstein Castle. On 18 September 1689, it was set on fire by French soldiers and two corners were blown up. Since then it has been a ruin. After the destruction of the tower house, the Hofmann moved into the farmhouse belonging to the castle estate, which had already burned down on 19 April 1675. It was subsequently rebuilt and destroyed by another fire in 1786. The then lord of the castle, cathedral dean, Anselm of Kerpen, planned the rebuilding of a larger house, but since the costs estimated by the architect were too high, it was rebuilt on the old, surviving foundations.

After the occupation of the Rhineland by the French under Napoleon the ruin was confiscated and, in the course of the secularisation, auctioned on 21 Frimaire XII, i.e. on 13 December 1803, to Trier lawyer, Wilhelm Josef Fritsch, for 9,000 francs. On 30 November 1826 Fritsch's heirs sold the castle to the Trierbrewer and red tanner (de), Franz Ludwig Bretz (also Britz), whose son Nikolaus opened a restaurant there in the 1870s. His descendants still own the castle and run a fifth-generation hotel-restaurant there.

The first restoration work was carried out in 1928. The eastern wall of the castle was strongly reinforced. In summer 1930, safety measures were carried out on the crown of the wall. Towards the end of the Second World War, however, the ruin suffered heavy damage from artillery fire and had to be repaired and made safe in 1987. The castle of Ramstein can be visited by appointment as part of a guided tour (contact the Society for the Preservation of Ramstein Castle - Förderverein Burg Ramstein ).

== Description ==
Ramstein Castle consists of an inner bailey and its associated domestic buildings on an oval area measuring roughly 37 × 57 metres. Of the former enceinte (curtain walls and corner towers) few remains survive. The Gothic castle is a tower house with a trapezoidal ground plan measuring 13 × 10.8 metres. It is estimated that its outer walls, 1.35 metres thick and made of rubble stone, were once 25 metres high and had four storeys. Of the latter, only two and parts of another survive; the maximum height is 18 metres. On the inside of the walls, holes for the former ceiling beams and the remains of seat niches and chimneys can be made out. The embrasures are made of grey and red sandstone quarried locally. Most of the tower windows have Gothic trefoil surrounds.

Very well preserved is the 1.55-metre-wide and 2.45-metre-high western entry portal of the tower which is separated from the outer bailey by a 4.70-metre-wide throat ditch. This probably used to be bridged by a wooden drawbridge. At one time entry from the outer bailey was from a stone staircase hewn in the rock, traces of which can still be seen.

The storeys of the tower can be reached via a helical staircase in two, round staircase towers made of hewn rock (Haustein) on the northeast corner and the outside of the south wall near the main entrance. On the ground floor is the largest fireplace of the house, which is why it is believed that this was where the kitchen was. There are 3 other fireplaces on the first floor, which was riven in two by a timber-framed wall. Perhaps the private living rooms of the lords of the castle were here. The second floor had a single large hall, which was presumably used for festivals, receptions and meetings. Missing fireplaces on the third floor and so the option of heating, indicate that this was the servants' floor.

== Literature ==
- Magnus Backes: Burgen und Schlösser an Mosel und Saar. Ein Burgen- und Reiseführer von Koblenz bis Saarbrücken. Stüder, Neuwied o. J., 1960.
- Matthias Kordel: Die schönsten Schlösser und Burgen in der Eifel. 1st edition. Wartberg, Gudensberg-Gleichen, 1999, ISBN 3-86134-482-3, pp. 64–65.
- Christian Lager: Notizen zur Geschichte der Burg Ramstein. In: Trierische Chronik. No. 9, 1907, pp. 129–141.
- Michael Losse: Die Mosel. Burgen, Schlösser, Adelssitze und Befestigungen von Trier bis Koblenz. Michael Imhof, Petersberg, 2007, ISBN 978-3-86568-240-6, pp. 102–103.
- N. Mohr: Die Geschichte der Burg Ramstein. Teile I-X. In: Ehranger Heimat. Vol. 3. 1937–1941.
- Sandra Ost: Burg Ramstein im Kylltal. Matergloriosa, Trier, 2006, ISBN 3-9811323-0-0.
- Hubert Thoma: Kleine Kordeler Chronik. Heimatverein Kordel, Trier, 1956, pp. 19 ff.
- Alexander Thon, Stefan Ulrich: „Von den Schauern der Vorwelt umweht …“ Burgen und Schlösser an der Mosel. 1st edition. Schnell & Steiner, Regensburg, 2007, ISBN 978-3-7954-1926-4, pp. 110–115.
