= Mouterhouse =

- Commune
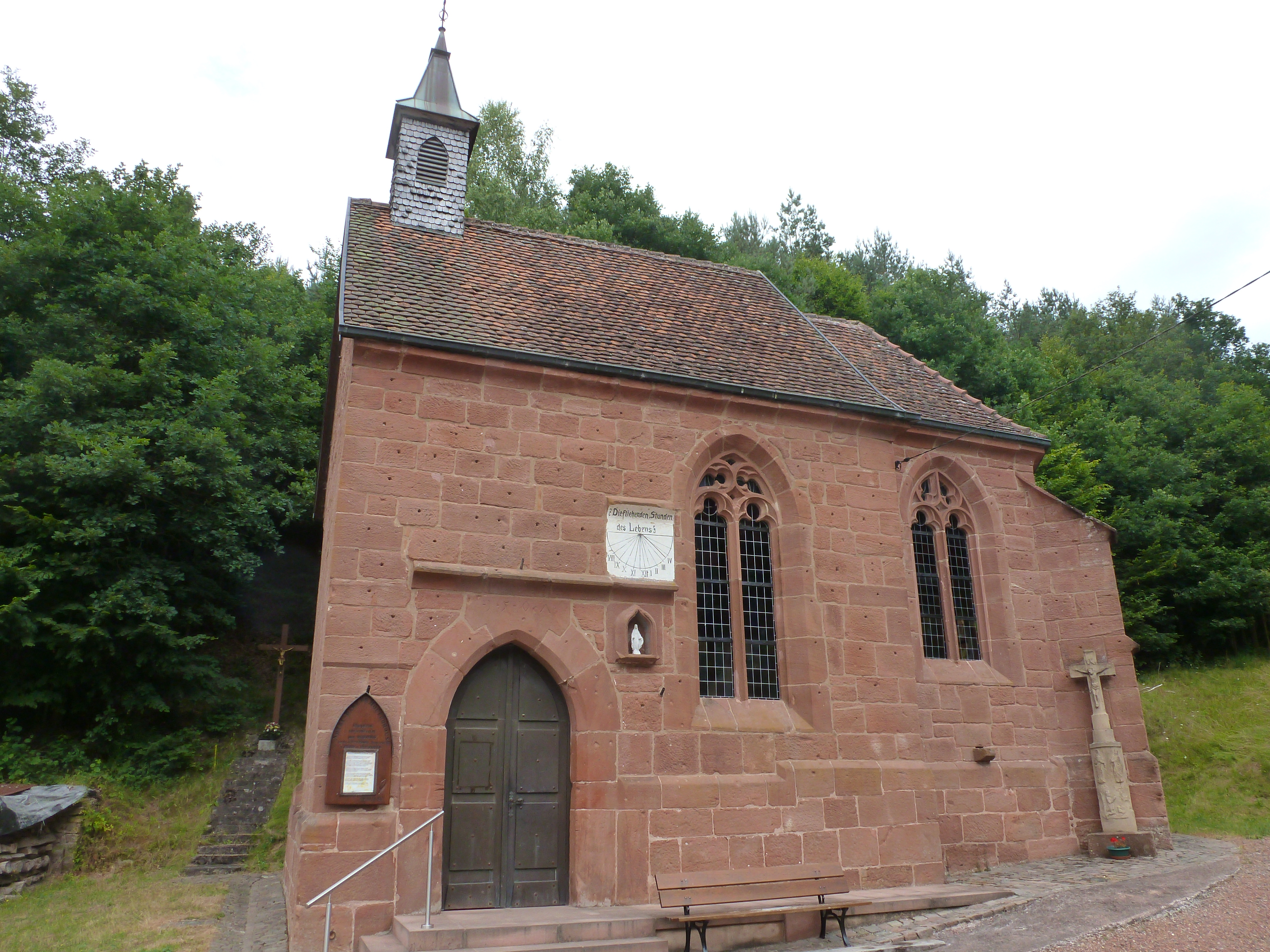
- The chapel in Mouterhouse

- Coat of arms
- Location of Mouterhouse
- Location within France Location within Grand Est
- Coordinates: 48°59′03″N 7°26′45″E
- Country: France
- Region: Grand Est
- Department: Moselle
- Arrondissement: Sarreguemines
- Canton: Bitche
- Intercommunality: CC du Pays de Bitche

Government
  - Mayor (2020–2026): Guy Hammer
- Area^{1}: 42.6 km^{2} (16.4 sq mi)
- Elevation: 380 m (1,250 ft)
- Highest elevation: 423 m (1,388 ft)
- Lowest elevation: 212 m (696 ft)
- Population (2023): 270
  - Density: 6.3/km^{2} (16/sq mi)
- Time zone: UTC+01:00 (CET)
  - Summer (DST): UTC+02:00 (CEST)
- INSEE/Postal code: 57489 /57620
- ^{1} French Land Register data, which excludes lakes, ponds, glaciers > 1 km^{2} (0.386 sq mi or 247 acres) and river estuaries.

Mouterhouse (French pronunciation: [mutəʁuz]; German: Mutterhausen; Lorraine Franconian: Muterhüse) is a commune in the Moselle department of the Grand Est administrative region in north-eastern France.

The village belongs to the Pays de Bitche and to the Northern Vosges Regional Nature Park.

== See also ==
- Communes of the Moselle department
