= Lambach HL.I =

HL.I

General information
- Type: Two seat sports and trainer aircraft
- National origin: Netherlands
- Manufacturer: Delft Student Aeroclub (DSA)
- Designer: Hugo Lambach
- Number built: 1

History
- First flight: 3 July 1935

The Lambach HL.1 was a one-off, simple tandem two seat trainer designed and built by members and ex-members of the Delft Student Aeroclub (DSA) in the Netherlands in the mid-1930s.

== Design and development ==
When in the early 1930s members of the DSA were trying to bring down the costs of tuition they decided that in the absence of public finance they would build their own aircraft. J.W.H. (Hugo) Lambach, a former DSA member, was asked to design a machine which would be cheap to produce and operate. A group of about twenty-five students set about its construction; some members of Pander Aircraft, including their chief designer Theo Lock, also assisted from time to time. Work began in the spring of 1934 and the Lambach HL.I made its first flight on 5 July 1935, piloted by Dick Asjes.

The HL.I was a cantilever low-wing monoplane with wings of constant chord and rounded tips. Its tail was conventional, with a braced straight-tapered horizontal tail mounted on top of the fuselage and a largely rounded vertical tail with a rudder which extended below the tailplane, moving within an elevator cut-out.

Its fuselage was round in section and tapered a little both forward and aft of the wings. The front open cockpit was just ahead of the wing leading edge and the rear cockpit, from which the HL.I was flown solo and which had a short, faired headrest, was at about two-thirds wing chord. During early testing the HL.1 was configured as a single-seater; it was also initially powered by a 34 kW (45 hp) Szekely SR-3 three- cylinder radial engine installed with its cylinder heads exposed for air cooling, but this proved unreliable and was replaced by a 67 kW (90 hp) Pobjoy Niagara seven-cylinder radial, also with cylinders exposed. Both engines drove two-blade propellers. The HL.1 had a fixed, conventional undercarriage with its mainwheels on tall, vertical, largely faired legs braced laterally by an inverted V pair of struts and longitudinally by trailing struts; there was also a tailskid.

== Operational history ==
The HL.I was appropriately registered as PH-DSA on 1 January 1936. In March the DSA transferred it to the Nationale Luchtvaartschool (National Flying School) at Ypenburg Airport where it served until the Germans invaded the Netherlands on 10 May 1940. The HL.1 avoided destruction by bombing which took many Dutch aircraft that day. The aircraft began to degrade after being moved out of its hangar by German forces and it was eventually handed back to the Technical University of Delft for instructional purposes, where it was dismantled.

== Specifications (Pobjoy engine) ==
Data from Wesselink

General characteristics

- Capacity: two
- Length: 7.70 m (25 ft 3 in)
- Wingspan: 11.20 m (36 ft 9 in)
- Gross weight: 585 kg (1,290 lb)
- Powerplant: 1 × Pobjoy Niagara 7-cylinder radial, 67 kW (90 hp)
- Propellers: 2-bladed

Performance

- Maximum speed: 140 km/h (87 mph, 76 kn)
