= Ouvrage Simserhof =

Gros ouvrage of the Maginot Line in France

- Part of Maginot Line
- Northeast France
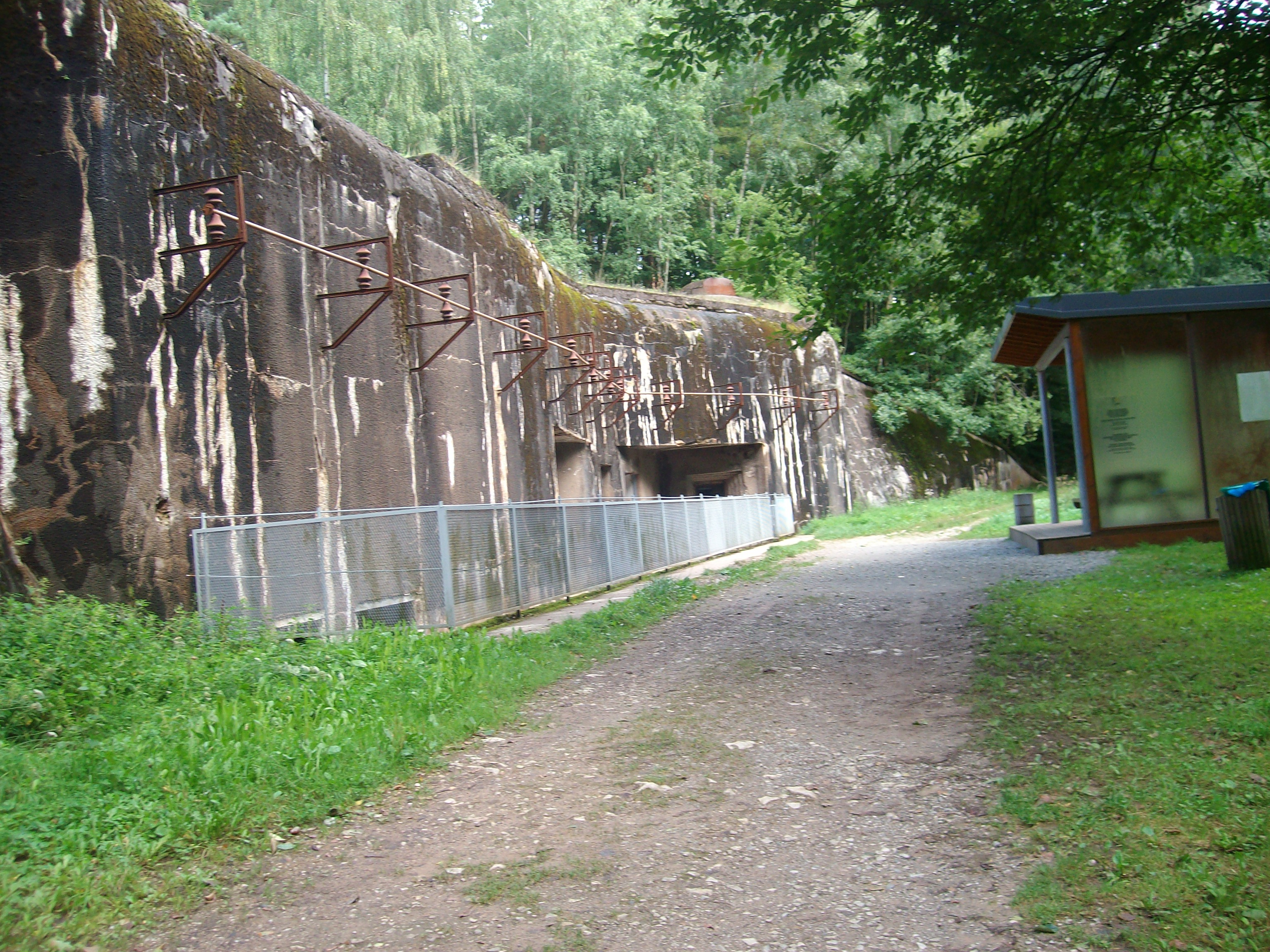
- Personnel entrance at Simserhof

Site information
- Owner: Ministry of Defense
- Controlled by: France
- Open to the public: Yes

Location
- Coordinates: 49.06167°N 7.34861°E

Site history
- Built by: CORF
- In use: Preserved
- Materials: Concrete, steel, deep excavation
- Battles/wars: Battle of France, Lorraine Campaign, Battle of the Bulge

Ouvrage Simserhof (French pronunciation: [uvʁaʒ simsəʁof]) is a gros ouvrage of the Maginot Line, located in the French commune of Siersthal in the Moselle department. It faces the German border and is adjoined by the petit ouvrage Rohrbach and the gros ouvrage Schiesseck. Located 4 km west of Bitche, the ouvrage derived its name from a nearby farm (Hof in German). It was part of the Fortified Sector of Rohrbach. During the Battle of France in 1940, the Simserhof supported its neighboring fortifications with partially successful covering artillery fire. After the surrender of France, it was repurposed by the Germans as a torpedo storage depot, and later resisted the American advances of late 1944. The Americans briefly occupied the fort in the first days of 1945 until the German counter-offensive of Operation Nordwind, which allowed them to take back control of the Simserhof. The fort was finally liberated by the 100th Infantry Division on March 15, 1945. Following the war, it was initially repaired for the French Army and later converted into a Maginot Line museum in the early 1960s. Retained by the Ministry of Defense, Simserhof now functions as a museum, and has the most extensive visitor infrastructure of any of the preserved Maginot fortifications.

== Design and construction ==
Initial project planning was led by Colonel Frossard. The first concept consisted of five closely spaced blocks fronted by an anti-tank ditch. The entry for the ouvrage (Note: English-language sources use the French term ouvrage as the preferred term for the Maginot positions, in preference to "fort", a term usually reserved for older fortifications with passive defenses in the form of walls and ditches. The literal translation of ouvrage in the sense of a fortification in English is "work." A gros ouvrage is a large fortification with a significant artillery component, while a petit ouvrage is smaller, with lighter arms.) was to be built in a ravine to the rear, with a 60 cm rail line running to a supply network farther behind the lines. The plan was rejected in July 1929 by CORF (Commission d'Organisation des Régions Fortifiées), the central planning agency for the Maginot Line. A number of objections were raised, including the amount of clear-cutting required, and an insufficient field of fire with dead ground exploitable by an attacker.

The second concept envisioned two ouvrages 300 metres (980 ft) apart, arranged for mutual support. This plan was adopted in September 1929 at the direction of Maréchal Pétain, despite increasing costs estimated at 38 million francs. Further modifications raised the projected cost to 62 million francs. Ultimately, eight combat blocks were constructed, with a single mixed entry, the principal work spanning from 1930 to 1933. The entire project ran from 1929 to 1938. By 1934 the central utility plant (usine) was in place, along with ammunition lifts and the internal railway. In 1938 the anti-tank obstacles were completed. Final costs were 118 million francs (equivalent to €30 million). Plans to provide blockhouses covering an anti-tank ditch were dropped.

== Description ==
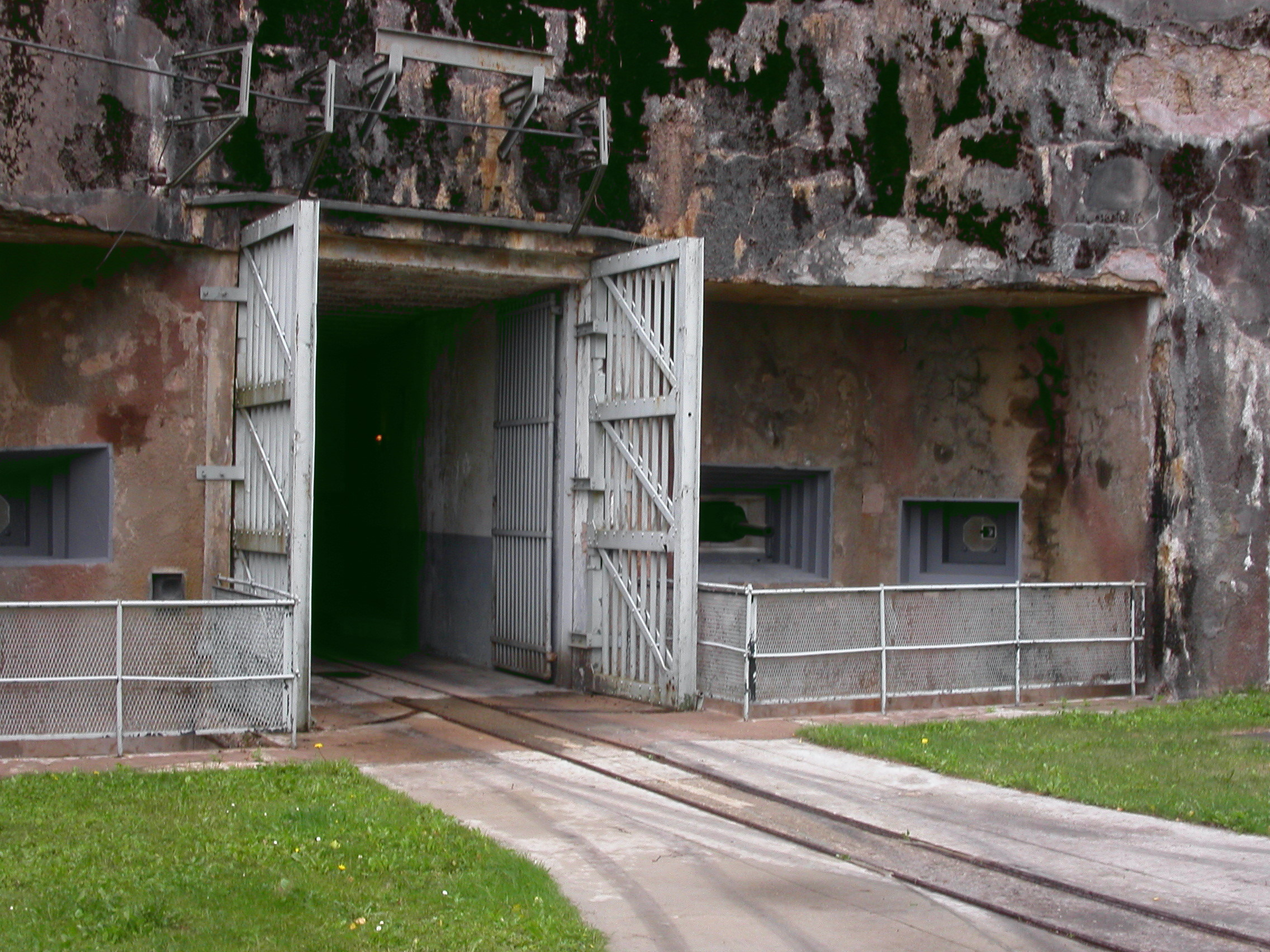
Simserhof's munitions entrance, showing the 60cm rail line

Simserhof was, like most Maginot fortifications, composed of a combat section and a support section. Two separate entries were provided for personnel and ammunition, with underground utilities, mess halls, and barracks near the personnel entrance. A large "M1" magazine was provided near the munitions entrance. The combat blocks were as much as 1800 meters from the entry. The entire ouvrage was provided with a 60 cm gauge electric railway that connected the service areas with the combat blocks, and which extended outside the position to a network of similar surface railways behind the main Line. The gallery system was excavated at an average depth of 27 metres (89 ft) below the surface.

- Block 1: Artillery block with one retractable twin machine gun turret, one automatic rifle cloche (GFM), one twin machine gun embrasure, one 135mm gun embrasure and one machine gun (JM)/47mm anti-tank gun embrasure (JM/AC47).
- Block 2: Infantry block with one observation cloche (VDP), one GFM cloche, one 81mm mortar cloche, one twin machine gun embrasure and one JM/AC47 embrasure.
- Block 3: Infantry block with two GFM cloches, one 81mm mortar turret, one twin machine gun embrasure and one JM/AC47 embrasure.
- Block 4: Artillery block with one GFM cloche, one retractable twin machine gun turrets, one twin machine gun embrasure, one JM/AC 37 embrasure and one 135mm gun embrasure.
- Block 5: Artillery block with three 75mm gun embrasures, one GFM cloche, one VDP cloche and one grenade launcher cloche (LG).
- Block 6: Artillery block with three 75mm gun embrasures, one VDP cloche, one LG cloche and one GFM cloche.
- Block 7: Artillery block with one 135mm gun turret and two GFM cloches.
- Block 8: Artillery block with two GFM cloches and one retractable twin 75mm gun turret.
- Personnel entry: Entry block with two GFM cloches, one LG cloche and one JM/AQC47 embrasure.
- Munitions entry: Entry block with two GFM cloches and one JM/AC47 embrasure.

Blocks 1, 2, and 5 comprised the west wing, and 3, 4 and 6 the east. Blocks 7 and 8, with their turrets, we located between the two wings and to the rear, along with the command post.

=== Casemates and shelters ===
A series of detached casemates and infantry shelters are in the vicinity of Simserhof, including

- Casemate du Sinnerberg Ouest: Single block with one JM/AC47 embrasure, one twin machine gun embrasure and a GFM cloche.
- Casemate du Sinnerberg Est: SIngle block with one JM/AC47 embrasure, one twin machine gun embrasure and a GFM cloche.
- Casemate de Petit-Réderching Ouest: Single block with one JM/AC47 embrasure, one twin machine gun embrasure and a GFM cloche.
- Casemate de Petit-Réderching Est: Single block with one JM/AC47 embrasure, one twin machine gun embrasure and a GFM cloche.
- Abri de Réderching: Subsurface abri-caverne (Note: An abri is an infantry shelter, sometimes underground or under earth cover. An abri in the main Maginot Line often closely resembles a casement, but is more lightly armed and can hold more occupants.) with three arms ports and three GFM cloches
- Casemate du Seelberg Ouest: Single block with one JM/AC47 embrasure, one twin machine gun embrasure and a GFM cloche, functioning as an observation post.
- Casemate du Seelberg Est: Single block with one JM/AC47 embrasure, one twin machine gun embrasure and a GFM cloche.
- Casemate de Judenhoff: Double block with two JM/AC47 embrasures, two twin machine gun embrasures and two GFM cloches.
- Abri de Fröhmühle: Subsurface abri-caverne with two automatic rifle embrasures.
- Casemate de Hohlbach: Single block with one JM/AC47 embrasure, one twin machine gun embrasure, a mortar cloche and two GFM cloches.
- Casemate de Légeret: Single block with one JM/AC47 embrasure, one twin machine gun embrasure, a mortar cloche and two GFM cloches.
- Abri de Légeret: Subsurface abri-caverne with two GFM cloches.

== Manning ==
Simserhof was garrisoned by 28 officers and 792 men of the 153rd Fortress Infantry Regiment and the 155th Position Artillery Regiment, as well as elements of the 1st, 15th and 18th Régiments du Génie. The garrison was commanded by Lieutenant Colonel Bonlarron from 25 April 1940. The ouvrage was under the overall command of the French 5th Army.

In times of peace, the active troops were stationed in newly built regular barracks in Légeret. When the ouvrage was on combat alert, daily life was similar to that of a warship.

== History ==
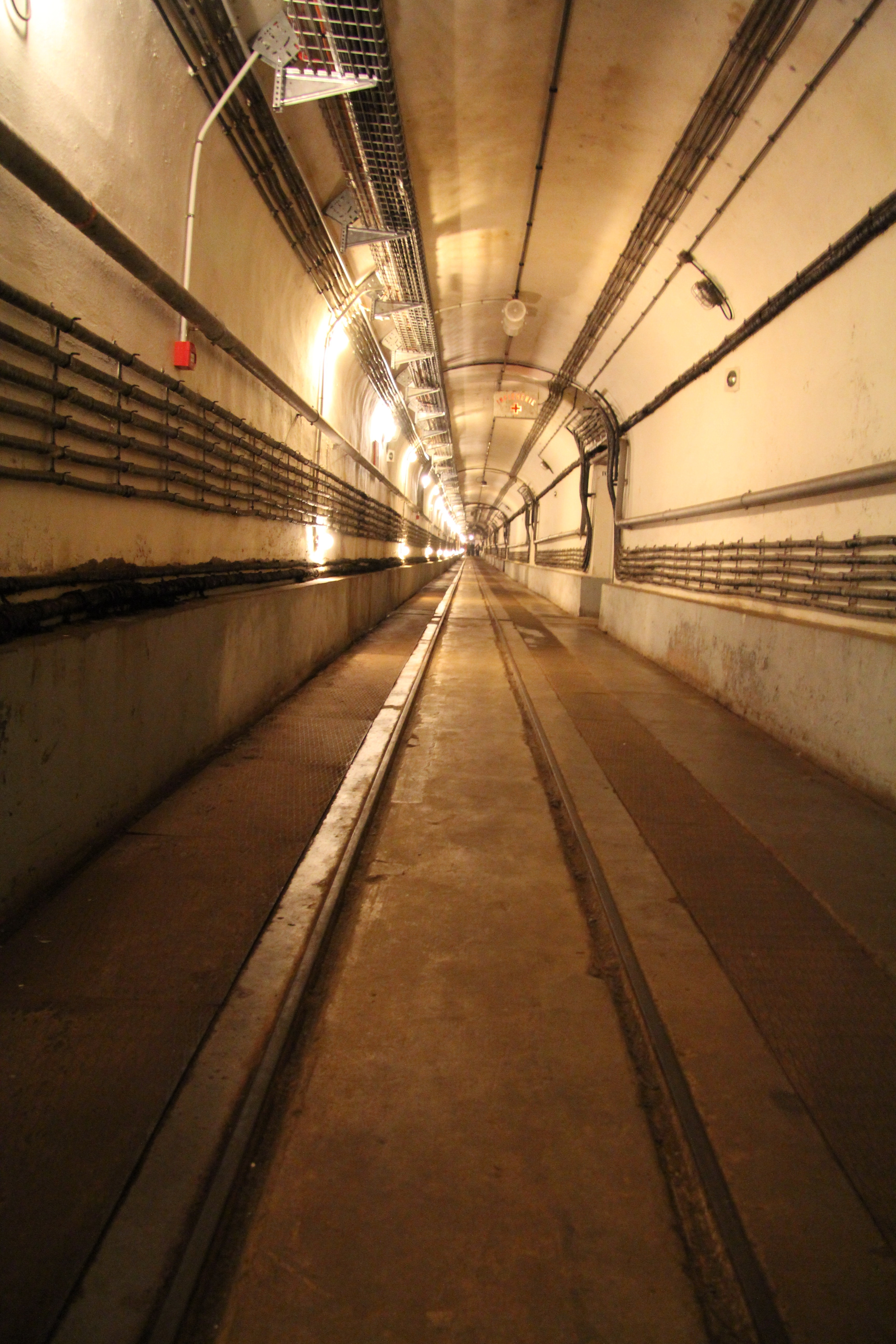
Simserhof tunnel

See Fortified Sector of Rohrbach for a broader discussion of the Rohrbach sector of the Maginot Line.

=== 1940 ===
Simserhof was first garrisoned in March 1936 while still incomplete. It was reinforced with fortress troops after the Munich Agreement in September 1938 and further augmented in March 1939. On 21 August 1939 the Maginot Line was brought to a state of readiness for war. General mobilization was ordered on 2 September, and a state of war was declared the following day. Simserhof fired for the first time on 12 October, when a 75mm gun turret supported troops twelve kilometers in front of the fortified line. On 10 May 1940, Germany launched the Blitzkrieg against the West, but in front of the Maginot Line, the front remained calm. On 12 May, Simserhof responded to the bombardment of advanced French posts.

On 13 June the troops of the field army in the intervals between fortifications began to withdraw towards the south. According to the plan, Simserhof would cover the withdrawal and the garrison troops would withdraw in turn after sabotaging the equipment. Simserhof provided covering fire from 15 June, but by the 16th it was apparent that the retreat was nearly impossible. Lt. Colonel Bonlarron stopped the sabotage and prepared for a siege. From 21 June the ouvrage's artillery fired to prevent German troops from advancing on its neighbor, Welschhof. Simserhof was too distant to support Ouvrage Haut-Poirier, and that position surrendered on the 22nd. The same day the Second Armistice at Compiègne was signed, which provided for a cease-fire from the 25th.

One the 24th the situation at Welschhof had declined, and the ouvrage surrendered. The same day, Simserhof protected Rohrbach against German attack, firing approximately 13,500 shells in defense of its neighbor. The fate of the garrisons under the armistice terms remained ambiguous. The Germans tried to negotiate with the ouvrages but were rebuffed each time, as the commanders of the ouvrages awaited orders from their superiors. On 30 June, at a meeting at Grand-Hohekirkel, Lt. Colonel Simon brought the ouvrage commanders the order to relinquish their fortifications to the victors.

On 30 June Simserhof formally surrendered and the Germans rendered honors to the garrison. Maintenance was continued by French technicians, and the ouvrage was used by the Germans as a storage facility for torpedoes.

=== 1944 ===
At the end of November 1944 the U.S. Seventh Army under General Alexander Patch pursued the Germans. Simserhof was occupied by elements of the German 25th Panzer Grenadier Division. on 14 December the 71st Infantry Regiment of the U.S. 44th Infantry Division assaulted Simserhof using tank destroyers to fire at firing apertures in block 5. Combat engineers were assigned to attack individual blocks. The fortress and surrounding casemates were captured after six days of fighting. On 20 December the Simershof's guns were prudently destroyed. The 44th Infantry yielded to the U.S. 100th Infantry Division, which occupied the ouvrage during the first days of 1945, but the German counter-offensive Operation Nordwind caused the occupiers to leave the fort. It was re-occupied on 15 March without resistance from the Germans. Bitche was finally liberated on 16 March.

=== Cold War ===
Following World War II, interest revived in the use of the Maginot Line to defend against a possible Soviet advance through southern Germany. Funds were allocated for restoration of the gros ouvrages, but work was limited to restoration of systems and improvements to existing armament, with work completed by 1953. In 1951, Simserhof had been designated part of the Mòle de Bitche, a strong point in the northeastern defenses against Soviet attack. By the late 1950s interest in fixed fortifications was waning after France developed a nuclear deterrent. The money needed to maintain and upgrade the fortifications was diverted for the nuclear programs. Simserhof was proposed as a potential museum in the 1960s.

== Preservation ==
Simserhof remains the property of the French Ministry of Defense. Its museum operations are managed by the Moselle département and the city of Bitche. Restoration work is ongoing. Simserhof has an extensive array of visitor services, including a gift shop, picnic area and café. The tour is limited to the entry, caserne and magazine, excluding the combat blocks.

== See also ==
- List of all works on Maginot Line
- Siegfried Line
- Atlantic Wall
- Czechoslovak border fortifications

== Bibliography ==
- Allcorn, William. The Maginot Line 1928-45. Oxford: Osprey Publishing, 2003. ISBN 1-84176-646-1
- Degon, André; Zylberyng, Didier, La Ligne Maginot: Guide des Forts à Visiter, Editions Ouest-France, 2014. ISBN 978-2-7373-6080-0 (in French)
- Kaufmann, J. E. and Kaufmann, H. W. Fortress France: The Maginot Line and French Defenses in World War II, Stackpole Books, 2006. ISBN 0-275-98345-5
- Kaufmann, J. E.; Kaufmann, H. W., Jancovič-Potočnik, A. and Lang, P. The Maginot Line: History and Guide, Pen and Sword, 2011. ISBN 978-1-84884-068-3
- Mary, Jean-Yves; Hohnadel, Alain; Sicard, Jacques. Hommes et Ouvrages de la Ligne Maginot, Tome 1. Paris, Histoire & Collections, 2001. ISBN 2-908182-88-2 (in French)
- Mary, Jean-Yves; Hohnadel, Alain; Sicard, Jacques. Hommes et Ouvrages de la Ligne Maginot, Tome 2. Paris, Histoire & Collections, 2003. ISBN 2-908182-97-1 (in French)
- Mary, Jean-Yves; Hohnadel, Alain; Sicard, Jacques. Hommes et Ouvrages de la Ligne Maginot, Tome 3. Paris, Histoire & Collections, 2003. ISBN 2-913903-88-6 (in French)
- Mary, Jean-Yves; Hohnadel, Alain; Sicard, Jacques. Hommes et Ouvrages de la Ligne Maginot, Tome 5. Paris, Histoire & Collections, 2009. ISBN 978-2-35250-127-5 (in French)
