= Ouvrage Welschhof =

- Part of Maginot Line, New Fronts
- Northeast France
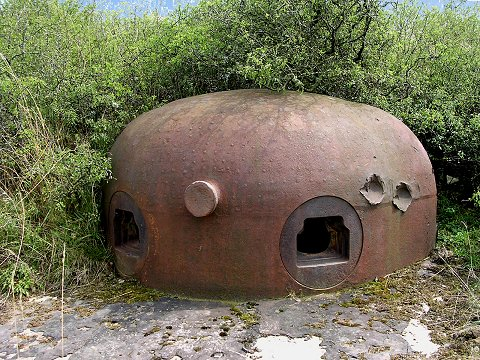
- Block 3 cloche with marks of the German attack of June 1940

Site information
- Controlled by: France

Location
- Coordinates: 49.05694°N 7.2225°E

Site history
- Built by: CORF
- In use: Abandoned
- Materials: Concrete, steel, deep excavation
- Battles/wars: Battle of France

Ouvrage Welschhof is a lesser work (petit ouvrage) of the Maginot Line, located near Rohrbach-lès-Bitche in the Moselle department of northeastern France. Located in the Fortified Sector of Rohrbach, the ouvrage consists of three infantry blocks, and is located between petit ouvrage Haut-Poirier and gros ouvrage Simserhof, facing Germany. Welschhof was attacked by German forces during the Battle of France on 21 June 1940 and was forced to surrender after a heavy artillery bombardment. It was re-equipped after the war, but was abandoned in the 1970s.

== Design and construction ==
The Rohrbach sector was built somewhat later than its neighbors to the east and west, and in company with positions on the extreme western end of the Maginot Line, became one of the "New Fronts." The site was surveyed by CORF (Commission d'Organisation des Régions Fortifiées), the Maginot Line's design and construction agency, and was approved for construction in February 1934. The petit ouvrage (Note: English-language sources use the French term ouvrage as the preferred term for the Maginot positions, in preference to "fort", a term usually reserved for older fortifications with passive defenses in the form of walls and ditches. The literal translation of ouvrage in the sense of a fortification in English is "work." A gros ouvrage is a large fortification with a significant artillery component, while a petit ouvrage is smaller, with lighter arms.) was to be expanded in a second phase with an 81mm mortar turret and a separate entrance block several hundred meters to the rear, behind the Welschhof farm for which the ouvrage was named.

== Description ==
Welschhof comprises three combat blocks. The blocks are linked by an underground gallery system containing barracks spaces, ammunition storage and utility services. The galleries are excavated at an average depth of up to 30 metres (98 ft). The majority of the service areas, barracks and magazines are located in the area of Block 1.

- Block 1: Infantry/entrance block, combined with the entry, with one machine gun (JM)/47mm anti-tank gun embrasure (JM/AC47), one machine gun embrasure (JM) and one mixed-arms embrasure (unique in the Line). The block is surmounted by a mixed arms cloche (AM) and two automatic rifle cloches (GFM-B).
- Block 2: Submerged (in the ground) block with a retractable mixed-arms turret and a Type B GFM cloche.
- Block 3: Infantry block opposite Block 1, with one JM/AC47 embrasure, one JM embrasure, two GFM cloches (Type B) and one AM cloche. The usine used two 85 horsepower (63 kW) SNIM engines.

=== Casemates and shelters ===
A series of detached casemates and infantry shelters are in the vicinity of Welschhof, including

- Casemate de l'Ouest de Singling: Double block with two JM/AC47 embrasures, one twin machine gun embrasures, one AM cloche and two GFM-B cloches.
- Casemate de Nord-Ouest de Singling Gauche: SIngle block with one JM/AC47 embrasure and one twin machine gun embrasure with a caponier facing Singling Driote armed with one twin machine gun embrasure and a GFM-B cloche.
- Casemate de Nord-Ouest de Singling Droite: Single block with one JM embrasure, two AM cloches and one GFM-B cloche.
- Casemate de Bining: Double block with twoJM/AC47 embrasures, one twin machine gun embrasure, one AM cloche and two GFM-B cloches.

== Manning ==
In 1939 the garrison comprised 158 men and three officers of the 166th Fortress Infantry Regiment under the command of Captain Lhuisset. The units were under the umbrella of the 4th Army, Army Group 2. The Casernement de Bining provided peacetime above-ground barracks and support services to Welschhof and other positions in the area.

== History ==
See Fortified Sector of Rohrbach for a broader discussion of the Rohrbach sector of the Maginot Line.

=== 1940 ===
On 21 June 1940 the Wehrmacht's 262nd Infantry Division attacked Welschhof and was stopped by fire from the 75 mm gun turret at Simserhof. The observers at Welschhof spotted counter-battery fire for Ouvrage Haut-Poirier against a German 150 mm gun.

During the night of 21–22 June, Haut-Poirier and Casemates Wittring, Grand-Bois and Nord-Est d'Achen surrendered to the Germans. During the morning of 22 June the Germans assembled a battery of light artillery to attack Welschhof, which was no longer covered by the positions to the west. The 75 mm turret at Simserhof fired in support of the Welschhof block. The Germans moved two 150 mm guns from the entrance to Simserhof and began to attack Block 1 at Welschhof and Casemate Ouest de Singling. 111 150mm rounds were fired at the façade of Block 1, breaching it, but the covering fire from Simserhof Block 5 continued to prevent the Germans from attacking the top of the block. On the morning of 24 June the tide turned and Simmerhof, at the limit of its range, could no longer fire on the top of Welschhof. Having learned of the fall of the Casemate de Bining, which protected Welschhof's flank, Captain Lhuisset decided to surrender at 10:00.

=== 1945 ===
American forces reached the area at the very end of 1944, with the U.S. 397th Infantry Regiment taking up positions around Welschhof, with no resistance from the ouvrage, which was not occupied by the Germans.

=== Post-War ===
By 1951 work was proceeding on renovation of many of the northeastern ouvrages, including Welschhof, with the aim of restoring their combat capability to block a potential advance by the Warsaw Pact. Welschhof and its neighbors were designated the môle de Bitche, a fortified strongpoint. After the establishment of the French nuclear strike force, the importance of the Line declined. Welschhof was among the first positions to be deactivated in 1970.

== Current condition ==
Welschhof is presently abandoned.

== See also ==
- List of all works on Maginot Line
- Siegfried Line
- Atlantic Wall
- Czechoslovak border fortifications

== Bibliography ==
- Allcorn, William. The Maginot Line 1928-45. Oxford: Osprey Publishing, 2003. ISBN 1-84176-646-1
- Kaufmann, J.E. and Kaufmann, H.W. Fortress France: The Maginot Line and French Defenses in World War II, Stackpole Books, 2006. ISBN 0-275-98345-5
- Kaufmann, J.E., Kaufmann, H.W., Jancovič-Potočnik, A. and Lang, P. The Maginot Line: History and Guide, Pen and Sword, 2011. ISBN 978-1-84884-068-3
- Mary, Jean-Yves; Hohnadel, Alain; Sicard, Jacques. Hommes et Ouvrages de la Ligne Maginot, Tome 1. Paris, Histoire & Collections, 2001. ISBN 2-908182-88-2 (in French)
- Mary, Jean-Yves; Hohnadel, Alain; Sicard, Jacques. Hommes et Ouvrages de la Ligne Maginot, Tome 2. Paris, Histoire & Collections, 2003. ISBN 2-908182-97-1 (in French)
- Mary, Jean-Yves; Hohnadel, Alain; Sicard, Jacques. Hommes et Ouvrages de la Ligne Maginot, Tome 3. Paris, Histoire & Collections, 2003. ISBN 2-913903-88-6 (in French)
- Mary, Jean-Yves; Hohnadel, Alain; Sicard, Jacques. Hommes et Ouvrages de la Ligne Maginot, Tome 5. Paris, Histoire & Collections, 2009. ISBN 978-2-35250-127-5 (in French)
