= Fortified Sector of the Sarre =

The Fortified Sector of the Sarre (Secteur Fortifié de la Sarre) was the French military organization that in 1940 controlled the section of the Maginot Line on either side of the Sarre river. The sector's defenses relied primarily on a system of inundations that could be created by fortified dikes and regulating weirs, backed by blockhouses. Weakly defended compared with other sections of the Maginot Line, the sector received a measure of attention and funding from the mid-1930s when the formerly demilitarized Saarland was reintegrated into Germany. However, with a single petit ouvrage it remained a weak point in the Line. In 1940 the Sarre sector was attacked by German forces in the Battle of France. The inundations were only partly successful, and German forces were able to pierce the Maginot Line at the Sarre, allowing German divisions to move behind the main French line.

== Concept and organization ==
Compared with much of the French border with Germany and Luxembourg, the valley of the Sarre was not heavily fortified. As long as the Saarland was demilitarized, the sector did not face a significant military threat. With the union of the Saarland with Germany in 1935, the area posed a greater threat. The shallow water tables in the area prevented deeply buried fortifications of the Maginot type in most of the sector, but presented opportunities for the defensive use of inundations. A system of reservoirs feeding diked impoundments gave France the ability to rapidly flood the valleys of the Nied and Moderbach rivers. The necessary dams, weirs and dikes were defended by blockhouses, and were themselves strongly built. Work had already taken place to inundate the Sarre, Albe and Modebach. Work on inundations of the Nied started in 1934. Construction of casemates to cover the flooded areas started in 1935. Three ouvrages armed with 75mm gun turrets were proposed: Remmerberg, Vahl-Ebersing and Valette, but funding difficulties prevented their construction. Only the petit ouvrage Haut-Poirier was built. The western part of the sector did not use inundations, relying on blockhouses along the Nied.

The weakness of the western portion of the sector was cause for concern during the Phoney War of 1939-40, resulting in the construction of the CEZF Line (Commission d'Étude des Zones Fortifiées), or Second Position, to the rear of the four western sub-sectors. A number of blockhouses were built under the auspices of the Service Technique du Génie (STG), but the line was incomplete in 1940, with long gaps between blockhouses.

The Région Fortifiée de la Sarre ("Fortified Region of the Sarre") was briefly created, encompassing the SF Sarre and the neighboring Fortified Sector of Rohrbach. The region existed for two months, in September and October 1939. Several transfers took place of sub-sectors to and from the neighboring SF Rohrbach and SF Faulquemont. In particular, Ouvrage Haut-Poirier was attached to Rohrbach at the time of its construction. Until 15 March 1940 the sector was called the Secteur Défensif de la Sarre.

== Command ==
The Sarre sector was under the overall command of the French 4th Army, headquartered at Vic-sur-Seille, under the command of General Réquin, which was in turn part of Army Group 2 under General André-Gaston Prételat. The SF Sarre was commanded by General Boucher until 2 January 1940, then Colonel Dagnan. The command post was at Hellimer. The interval troops, the army formations that were to provide the mobile defense for the sector, to support and be supported by the fixed defenses, were under the command of the 20th Corps (20e Corps d'Armee), General Hubert, commander. The 20th Corps was in turn made up of the 11th and 52nd Infantry Divisions, as well as the 82nd African Infantry Division Artillery support for the sector was provided by the 66th Position Artillery Regiment (Régiment d'Artillerie de Position (RAP)), which controlled both fixed and mobile artillery, commanded by Lieutenant Colonel Robert. The 11th ID and the 82nd DIA were made up of active-service troops, while the 52nd ID was a Class B reserve formation, not suitable for heavy or sustained combat.

At the midpoint of the Battle of France on 1 June 1940, the fortress troops of the SF Sarre amounted to two fortress infantry regiments in six battalions and two fortress machine gun infantry regiments in six battalions, comprising 600 officers and 17,000 men. After 13 June, many retreating units were organized into mobile units to try to establish stop lines. In the Sarre sector, retreating units were organized into the Dagnan group, under the 20th Army Corps' command.

== Description ==
The sector includes, in order from west to east, the following major fortified positions, together with the most significant casemates and infantry shelters in each sub-sector: (Note: English-language sources use the French term ouvrage as the preferred term for the Maginot positions, in preference to "fort", a term usually reserved for older fortifications with passive defenses in the form of walls and ditches. The literal translation of ouvrage in the sense of a fortification in English is "work." A gros ouvrage is a large fortification with a significant artillery component, while a petit ouvrage is smaller, with lighter arms.)

=== Sub-sector of Lixing ===
69th Fortress Machine-gun Infantry Regiment (69^{e} Régiment des Mitrailleurs d'Infanterie de Forteresse (RMIF)), Lt. Colonel Jobin, command post at the Bois de Brill

The sector included ten blockhouses, designated by number, and two artillery casemates, Noonenwald (AC7B) and Biding Nord (AC 3B), which provided flanking fire along the blockhouse line with 75mm guns. The sub-sector 's positions were located on the south bank of the Nied.

Peacetime barracks and support:

- Casernement de Lixing

=== Sub-sector of Altrippe or Leyviller ===
82nd Fortress Infantry Regiment (82^{e} Régiment d'Infanterie de Forteresse (RIF)), Lt. Colonel Matheu, command post to the south of the Vieux-Bois at Leyviller

The sector comprised six blockhouses on the south bank of the Nied, with two flanking casemates mounting 75mm guns. The casemates were Biding Sud (AC 5B) and La Costaude (AC 1B).

Peacetime barracks and support:

- Casernement de Leyviller
- Casernement de Barst

=== Sub-sector of Saint-Jean-Rohrbach ===
174th Fortress Machine-gun Infantry Regiment (174^{e} Régiment des Mitrailleurs d'Infanterie de Forteresse (RMIF)), Lt. Colonel Duparant, command post at the Corne du Plaffenbusch

The sector comprised ten blockhouses, mostly on the south side of the Moderbach, all built by the STG. The sector also included four fortified dikes intended to control inundations along the Moderbach:

- Réservoir de Hoste-Haut (R8 B)
- Réservoir de Hoste-Bas (R6 B)
- Digue de Loupershouse (R4 B) (Note: A digue is a dike. A bief is an adjustable weir or the impoundment created by the device.)
- Digue de Puttelange (R12 B)

Water features included:

- Réservoir de Hoste-Haut, area 23 hectares (57 acres), 579,000 m^{3}
- Réservoir de Hoste-Bas, area 14 hectares (35 acres), 156,400 m^{3}
- Réservoir de Diffembach, area 46 hectares (110 acres), 2,150,000 m^{3}
- Bief de Loupershouse, 260,000 m^{3}
- Bief de Puttelange, 1,200,000 m^{3}

Peacetime barracks and support:

- Casernement de Saint-Jean-Rohrbach

=== Sub-sector of Kappelkinger ===
41st Colonial Machine-gun Infantry Regiment (41^{e} Régiment des Mitrailleurs d'Infanterie du Casemate (RMIC)), Lt. Colonel Tristani

The sector lacked blockhouses or casemates entirely, consisting of two advanced posts, Grundviller and Hill 242.

Water features included:

- Réservoir de Rémering, area 56 hectares (140 acres), 960,000 m^{3}
- Réservoir d'Hirbach, 1,221,830 m^{3}
- Bief de Rémering, 390,000 m^{3}
- Bief de Richeling, 260,000 m^{3}
- Bief d'Holving, 850,000 m^{3}

Peacetime barracks and support:

- Casernement de Puttelange

=== Sub-sector of Sarralbe ===
51st Colonial Machine-gun Infantry Regiment (51^{e} Régiment des Mitrailleurs d'Infanterie du Casemate (RMIC)), Lt. Colonel Revier de Mauny, command post at Keskastel

Like the Kappelkinger sub-sector, the Sarralbe sub-sector had only two advanced posts: Willerwald and Kisswald.

Peacetime barracks and support:

- Casernement de Sarralbe

=== Sub-sector of Kalhausen ===
133rd Fortress Infantry Regiment (133^{e} Régiment d'Infanterie de Forteresse (RIF)), Colonel Bertrand, command post at Kalhausen

- Ouvrage Haut-Poirier, petit ouvrage O220 of three combat blocks and one entry block
- Casemate de Wittring
- Casemate du Grand-Bois
- Casemate du Nord-Ouest d'Achen
- Casemate du Nord d'Achen
- Casemate du Nord-Est d'Achen

=== Second position - CEZF Line ===
A fallback line behind the main line, roughly following the south bank of the Albe river. Twenty-two STG-style casemates were proposed, of which thirteen were constructed.

== Battle of France ==
The SF Sarre first saw action on 15 May 1940, when Nazi German forces launched a brief offensive in the area, intended as a feint to draw French forces from other sectors, in particular from the area of Sedan, where the main attack by the Wehrmacht was to fall. Named Operation Fackel ("Torch"), the German operation used three divisions, the 60th, 75th, and the 258th infantry divisions under the XII armeekorps. The operation was a success, surprising the French 11th Infantry and the 82nd Algerian Infantry divisions after a short but heavy artillery barrage. Initial German objectives were taken, but forces rallied and fought on for as many as three days. The French 2nd Army Group withdrew to the vicinity of the Maginot Line and deferred transfers of forces to other sectors, achieving the effect desired by the Germans of preventing reinforcement at Sedan.

=== Operation Tiger ===
The Nazi German assault in earnest on the SF Sarre, Operation Tiger, opened on 14 June with an artillery bombardment that had little effect on French defenses. Nevertheless, the offensive arrayed the German First Army (AOK 1), which deployed the XII (XII AK, 75th and 268th IDs), XXIV (XXIV AK, 60th and 252nd IDs) and XXX (XXX AK, 79th, 93rd and 258th IDs) Corps, backed by a reserve composed of the 168th, 197th, 198th and 257th IDs against the French 20th Corps. The 20th Corps was composed of five regiments of fortress infantry supported by the 52nd ID and the 1st Polish Grenadiers. German air support was provided by V Fliegerkorps. The principal attack started at 0730, with XII AK and XXX AK moving against the west side of the Sarre valley, XXIV moving to the east in support. The German attack focused on the Valette village. The attack met with mixed success, taking casualties from unsuppressed French artillery, but capturing several French blockhouses. The 93rd ID's attack stalled, however, taking fire from the main line of fortifications, forcing a withdrawal. An attempted crossing of the Nied by the 258th ID failed as well. Fire from a French 75mm casemate destroyed German artillery and bridging equipment. The 268th ID's attack initially stalled, but broke through French lines at Hoste. The 75th ID's attack across the Moderbach also produced success after an initial setback. XXIV AK's attack on the east side of the sector failed entirely and was the object of a successful French counterattack.

Faced with the progressive collapse of the French First Army to the west, the French command in mid-June ordered the withdrawal of field army units and interval troops from the Maginot Line, to be carried out from 13 June. Operation Tiger therefore unfolded at the time of the planned withdrawal. With high casualties and less than overwhelming success, the commanding German Colonel General von Witzleben considered calling off the offensive, but a captured copy of French withdrawal plans caused him to continue the attack. That night French units moved south past the CEZF Line. The next day German forces pushed aside the French rear-guard and fought the French 52nd ID and the Polish Grenadiers, who stopped the German advance for the day and withdrew the night of the 15th. Serious French resistance to the German breakthrough ended, leaving German forces free to move along the Maginot Line's rear.

The Wehrmacht's 262nd ID approached Haut-Poirier from the rear on 21 June. The Germans opened fire with 155mm artillery at 1500 hours, concentrating on Block 3. Without artillery support from a gros ouvrage, and with Blocks 1 and 2 were unable to intervene, their fire blocked by terrain, Haut-Poirier surrendered at 2200 hours. The casemates nearby surrendered at the same time.

After the June 1940 armistice the Germans stripped Haut-Poirier of all equipment. The ouvrage was in poor condition after the war and was not chosen for renovation.

=== Units ===
The 41st Colonial Machine Gun Infantry Regiment defended the Moderbach and Albe valleys in the Kappelkinger sub-sector. In June 1940 the retreating 41st RMIC was attached to the Dagnan group of mobile forces and tretreated into the Vosges, fighting at Mittersheim, Avricourt and finally Nompatelize, where the unit surrendered to German forces on 22 June.

The 51st Colonial Machine Gun Infantry Regiment was positioned in the Sarralbe sub-sector. It joined the Dagnan group on 14 June, retreating through Harskirchen to the Marne-Rhine Canal, then to Montreux, Neufmaisons and La Salle, surrendering near Rambervillers on 23 June.

The 69th Fortress Machine Gun Infantry Regiment occupied the Lixing sub-sector, which was transferred to the SF Faulquemont on 15 March 1940. During Operation Tiger, the regiment faced the German 258th Infantry Division. In retreat, the unit was attached to the Girval group as it made its way to the Marne-Rhine Canal from 14 June. The regiment was captured 19–20 June in the area of Lunéville.

The 82nd Fortress Machine Gun Infantry Regiment was located in the Leyviller sub-sector. On 15 March 1940 the sub-sector fell under the control of the SF Faulquemont. Following the 2 June attack, the regiment retreated as part of the Girval group of mobile units, retreating in good order, but was taken prisoner between 19 and 21 June near Bruyères and the Col du Haut-Jacques.

The 133rd Fortress Infantry Regiment was stationed in the Kalhausen sub-sector, which was transferred from the SF Rohrbach to the SF Sarre on 15 March 1940. The regiment 's second battalion provided the garrison for Ouvrage Haut-Poirier. Units of the regiment that could disengage retreated towards Sarre-Union and Fénétrange, regrouping on the Marne-Rhine Canal. Driven off the canal line, retreat continued to Raon-l'Etape, where the unit surrendered on 21 June. The units left at Haut-Poirier surrendered the same day.

The 174th Fortress Machine Gun Infantry Regiment watched the Saint-Jean-Rohrbach sub-sector. Unusually for a fortress unit, the regiment took part in a brief offensive on the Wandt from 10 to 23 September 1939, part of the Marion group of forces. The 174th's sub-sector was attacked by the German 52nd Infantry Division on 5 June, and was the object of a major thrust of Operation Tiger on 14 June. In retreat, the regiment was assigned to the Dagnan group, retreating to Salles.

== Present status ==
Haut-Poirier is on private property and is sealed to access. The Casemate de Wittring is maintained as a museum and may be visited. At Barst, two STG casemates have been restored as part of a display on the frontier defenses.

== Bibliography ==
- Allcorn, William. The Maginot Line 1928-45. Oxford: Osprey Publishing, 2003. ISBN 1-84176-646-1
- Degon, André; Zylberyng, Didier, La Ligne Maginot: Guide des Forts à Visiter, Editions Ouest-France, 2014. ISBN 978-2-7373-6080-0 (in French)
- Kaufmann, J.E. and Kaufmann, H.W. Fortress France: The Maginot Line and French Defenses in World War II, Stackpole Books, 2006. ISBN 0-275-98345-5
- Kaufmann, J.E., Kaufmann, H.W., Jancovič-Potočnik, A. and Lang, P. The Maginot Line: History and Guide, Pen and Sword, 2011. ISBN 978-1-84884-068-3
- Mary, Jean-Yves; Hohnadel, Alain; Sicard, Jacques. Hommes et Ouvrages de la Ligne Maginot, Tome 1. Paris, Histoire & Collections, 2001. ISBN 2-908182-88-2 (in French)
- Mary, Jean-Yves; Hohnadel, Alain; Sicard, Jacques. Hommes et Ouvrages de la Ligne Maginot, Tome 3. Paris, Histoire & Collections, 2003. ISBN 2-913903-88-6 (in French)
- Mary, Jean-Yves; Hohnadel, Alain; Sicard, Jacques. Hommes et Ouvrages de la Ligne Maginot, Tome 5. Paris, Histoire & Collections, 2009. ISBN 978-2-35250-127-5 (in French)
- Romanych, Marc; Rupp, Martin. Maginot Line 1940: Battles on the French Frontier. Oxford: Osprey Publishing, 2010. ISBN 1-84176-646-1
