= Château de Bonnefontaine =

Château de Bonnefontaine may refer to:

- Château de Bonnefontaine (Bas-Rhin), a château in Altwiller in the department of Bas-Rhin, France
- Château de Bonnefontaine (Ille-et-Vilaine), a château in the commune of Antrain, Ille-et-Vilaine, France
