= 25th Panzergrenadier Division =

25th Infantry Division 25th Motorized Infantry Division 25th Panzergrenadier Division
- German: 25. Infanterie-Division; 25. Infanterie-Division (mot.); 25. Panzergrenadier-Division
- Divisional insignia
- Active: 1936–45
- Country: Nazi Germany
- Branch: German Army
- Type: Infantry; Panzergrenadier
- Role: Armoured warfare
- Size: Division
- Nickname: Stuttgarter Haus Division
- Engagements: World War II

Commanders
- Notable commanders: Anton Graßer

The 25th Infantry Division (German: 25. Infanterie-Division) was a military unit of the German Wehrmacht. It was later reclassified to 25th Motorized Infantry Division (25. Infanterie-Division (mot.)), and in June 1943 to the 25th Panzergrenadier Division (25. Panzergrenadier-Division).

The 25th Panzergrenadier Division fought in the central sector of the Eastern front from June 1943 to July 1944. It was destroyed in the encirclement east of Minsk and reformed in October 1944. It then fought in Western Europe between October 1944 and January 1945 and in eastern Germany January to May 1945. Most of the survivors of the division surrendered to the western Allies.

== History ==
=== Battle of France and Eastern Front ===
The 25th Panzergrenadier Division was originally formed as an infantry unit, designated 25th Infantry Division and made up of Swabian and Bavarian personnel. It participated in the Polish Campaign and the Battle of France.

In late 1940, it was reorganized as the 25th motorized infantry division and took part in Operation Barbarossa, the invasion of the Soviet Union, in June 1941. It was attached to Army Group Center and fought in the Soviet Union for two years before being reorganized as the 25th Panzergrenadier Division in June 1943. After another year of heavy fighting, the division was almost destroyed near Minsk during the Soviet Operation Bagration in the summer of 1944; the survivors were reorganized at the training area at Mielau (in modern-day Poland) as the 107th Panzer Brigade.

=== Western Front (1944–1945) ===
In September 1944, the 107th Panzer Brigade participated in Operation Market Garden as part of LXXXVI Corps of the 1st Parachute Army. The Brigade had been re-routed from Aachen to the Netherlands and went almost immediately into combat at Nuenen against the American 506th PIR of the 101st Airborne Division and the British 15th/19th The King's Royal Hussars of the 11th Armoured Division.

In November 1944, the brigade was upgraded back to divisional status at the Baumholder training area and re-numbered back as the 25th Panzergrenadier Division.

The new division moved to France in the area of the German-Luxembourg-French border at Sierck-les-Bains, where it fought a delaying action against the US Third Army, until December. It was then moved to Bitche. There it fought on the Maginot Line fortifications at Forts Ouvrage Simserhof and Ouvrage Schiesseck, under the command of the XIII SS Corps and Obergruppenführer Max Simon.

After the US Seventh Army's offensive operations were halted in December as a result of the German Ardennes Offensive, the 25th was pulled out of the line and re-organized near Zweibrücken. It then took part in Operation Nordwind, along with the 21st Panzer Division. Together, these divisions were to exploit the penetrations made by either the XIII SS Corps in the west, or the LXXXIX and XC Corps in the east, with the intention of cutting the US Seventh Army off from the 1st French Army. It was then sent back to the eastern front to defend against the Soviet attack on the Oder north of Berlin, most of the survivors managed to escape to the west and surrendered to the British or Americans.

== Commanders ==
- Generalleutnant Christian Hansen (6 October 1936 – 15 October 1939)
- Generalleutnant Erich-Heinrich Clößner (15 October 1939 – 15 January 1942)
- Generalmajor Sigfrid Henrici (15 January - 4 February 1942)
- General der Infanterie, Anton Graßer (4 February 1942 – 5 November 1943)
- Generalleutnant Dr. Fritz Benicke (5 November 1943 – 4 March 1944)
- Generalleutnant Paul Schürmann (4 March 1944 – July 1944)
- Generalleutnant Paul Schürmann (October 1944 – 10 February 1945)
- Generalleutnant Arnold Burmeister (10 February 1945 – 8 May 1945)

== Order of battle ==
- Division Staff
  - 25. Mapping Detachment (mot)
- 35. Panzergrenadier Regiment
  - Staff Company
    - Panzerjäger Platoon
    - Motorcycle Platoon
    - Signals Platoon
    - Pioneer Platoon
  - 3 Battalions
    - Battalion Staff
    - 3 Companies (mot)
    - Machine Gun Company (mot)
    - Infantry Gun Company
- 119. Panzergrenadier Regiment
  - Staff Company
    - Panzerjäger Platoon
    - Motorcycle Platoon
    - Signals Platoon
    - Pioneer Platoon
  - 3 Battalions
    - Battalion Staff
    - 3 Companies (mot)
    - Machine Gun Company (mot)
    - Infantry Gun Company
- 125. Panzer Reconnaissance Battalion
  - Battalion Staff
  - Light Armored Car Company
  - 3 Motorcycle Companies
  - Heavy Company (mot)
  - Pioneer Platoon
  - 2 Panzerjäger Platoons
  - Light Infantry Gun Section
- 125. Panzerjäger Battalion
  - Staff Company
  - 3 Panzerjäger Companies (self-propelled)
  - Flak Company (self-propelled)
- 8. Panzer Battalion
  - Staff Company
  - Flak Platoon
  - 3 Sturmgeschütz Batteries
  - Panzer Maintenance Platoon
- 25. Artillery Regiment
  - Staff Battery
  - 3 Battalions
    - Staff Battery (mot)
    - 3 Batteries (mot)
- 25. Pioneer Battalion
  - Battalion Staff
  - 3 Companies (mot)
  - Light Pioneer Column (mot)
- 25. Signals Battalion
  - Battalion Staff
  - Telephone Company (mot)
  - Radio Company (mot)
  - Signals Column (mot)
- Supply and Support Units

== In popular culture ==
The action at Nuenen by the 107th Panzer Brigade during Operation Market Garden is dramatized in episode 4 "Replacements" of the 2001 television series Band of Brothers.
