= Fortified Sector of Rohrbach =

- Secteur Fortifié de Rohrbach
- Part of Maginot Line
- Near Bitche, France
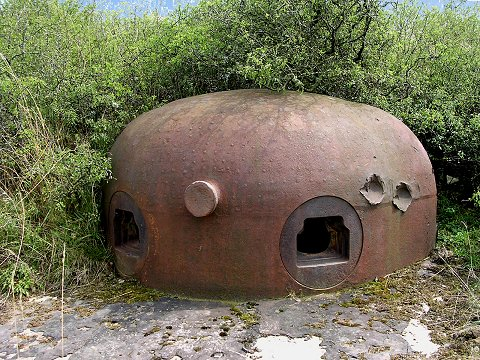
- Mixed-arms cloche at Simserhof with artillery damage.

Site information
- Owner: French Ministry of Defense, except Rohrbach, or "Fort Casso," Association Fort Casso since 1989. Simserhof, while remaining the property of the Ministry of Defense, is managed by the Moselle département and the city of Bitche.
- Controlled by: France and Nazi Germany in World War II.
- Open to the public: Rohrbach and Simserhof
- Condition: Preserved: Rohrbach and Simserhof

Site history
- Built: Late 1930s
- Battles/wars: World War II; Cold War

The Fortified Sector of Rohrbach (Secteur Fortifié de Rohrbach) was the French military organization that in 1940 controlled the section of the Maginot Line in the vicinity of Bitche. The sector was bordered to the west by the Fortified Sector of the Sarre and to the east by the Fortified Sector of the Vosges. With lower priority than other sectors, the SF Rohrbach was built somewhat later than its neighbors to the east and west, and in company with positions on the extreme western end of the Maginot Line, became one of the "New Fronts." The sector contains several major ouvrages and was the scene of fighting in both 1940 and 1944. It was attacked in 1940 by German forces in the Battle of France. The sector was heavily engaged by German forces in mid-June 1940, with several casemates and the petit ouvrage Welschhof surrendering before the Second Armistice at Compiègne. The remaining positions and their garrisons finally surrendered on 27 June 1940. In 1944 German forces occupied several positions in the SF Rohrbach, forcing advancing American forces to attack them individually or to bypass them. The German Operation Nordwind offensive of early 1945 caused American forces to fall back, returning to complete the capture of the Rohrbach sector in March 1945. Following the war many positions were reactivated for use during the Cold War. Two locations are now preserved and open to the public.

== Concept and organization ==
The Rohrbach sector was part of the larger Fortified Region of the Lauter, a strongly defended area between the Ardennes to the west and the Sarre valley to the east. The Lauter region was more important during the planning and construction phase of the Maginot Line than it was in the operational phase of the Line, when the sectors assumed prominence. The Fortified Region of the Lauter was dissolved as a military organization on 18 March 1940.

The sector featured a strong line of ouvrages (Note: English-language sources use the French term ouvrage as the preferred term for the Maginot positions, in preference to "fort", a term usually reserved for older fortifications with passive defenses in the form of walls and ditches. The literal translation of ouvrage in the sense of a fortification in English is "work." A gros ouvrage is a large fortification with a significant artillery component, while a petit ouvrage is smaller, with lighter arms.) across the entire sector, with a concentration of positions on and in the vicinity of the major French army base, the Camp de Bitche. The sector was afforded a high priority, with planning work starting in 1929 as part of the first cycle of fortification work. One ouvrage, the petit ouvrage Seelberg, was not constructed; two casemates were built instead. Seelberg was to have had five combat blocks and two entries.

A Région Fortifiée de la Sarre ("Fortified Region of the Sarre") was briefly created, encompassing the SF Rohrbach and the neighboring SF Sarre. The region existed for two months, in September and October 1939.

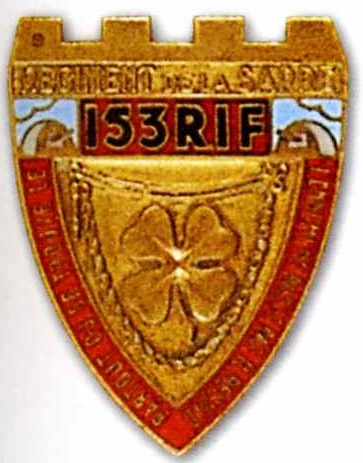
Insignia of the 153rd RIF.

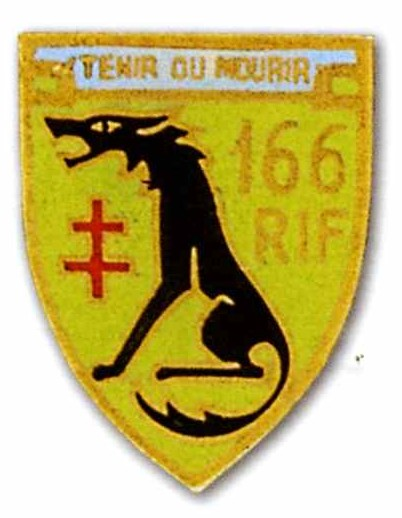
Insign of the 166th RIF.

== Command ==
The Rohrbach sector was under the overall command of the French 5th Army, headquartered at Wangenbourg, under the command of General Bourret, which was in turn part of Army Group 2 under General André-Gaston Prételat. The SF Rohrbach was commanded by General Boutignon, then General Mortemart until 7 May 1940, then General Chastenet. The command post was at the Moulin de Montbronn. The interval troops, the army formations that were to provide the mobile defense for the sector, to support and be supported by the fixed defenses, were under the command of the 8th Corps (8e Corps d'Armee), General Desmazes, commander. The 8th Corps was in turn made up of the 24th Infantry Division and the 31st Alpine Infantry Division. Artillery support for the sector was provided by the 150th Position Artillery Regiment (Régiment d'Artillerie de Position (RAP)), which controlled both fixed and mobile artillery, commanded by Colonel Jaunon The 31e DIA was made up of active-service troops, while the 24th ID was a Class A reserve formation.

At the midpoint of the Battle of France on 1 June 1940, the fortress troops of the SF Rohrbach amounted to three fortress infantry regiments in nine battalions, comprising 575 officers and 16,850 men.

== Description ==
The sector includes, in order from west to east, the following major fortified positions, together with the most significant casemates and infantry shelters in each sub-sector:

=== Sub-sector of Bining ===
166th Fortress Infantry Regiment (166^{e} Régiment d'Infanterie de Forteresse (RIF)), Lt. Colonel Subervie, command post at the Mohrendorf farm.

- Ouvrage Welschhof, petit ouvrage O240 of three combat blocks
- Ouvrage Rohrbach, petit ouvrage O250 of three combat blocks
- Casemate de l'Ouest de Singling
- Casemate de l'Ouest de Singling Gauche
- Casemate du Nord-Ouest de Singling Droite
- Casemate de Bining
- Casemate de la Station-de-Rohrbach
- Abri de Rohrbach (Note: An abri is an infantry shelter, sometimes underground or under earth cover. An abri in the main Maginot Line often closely resembles a casemate, but is more lightly armed and can hold more occupants.)

Peacetime barracks and support:

- Casernement de Bining (Rohrbach)

=== Sub-sector of Légeret ===
153rd Fortress Infantry Regiment (153^{e} Régiment d'Infanterie de Forteresse (RIF)), Lt. Colonel Mauvin, command post at the Abri de la Fröhmühle.

- Ouvrage Simserhof, gros ouvrage O300 of eight combat blocks and two entry blocks
- Ouvrage Seelberg, petit ouvrage, never built
- Casemate du Sinnerberg Ouest
- Casemate du Sinnerberg Est
- Casemate de Petit-Récherding Ouest
- Casemate de Petit-Récherding Est
- Casemate de Petit-Récherding
- Casemate du Seelberg Ouest
- Casemate du Seelberg Est
- Casemate du Judenhoff
- Abri de Fröhmühle
- Casemate d'Holbach
- Casemate de Légeret
- Abri de Légeret
- Observatoire du Freudenberg
- Abri du Freudenberg
- Casemate du Freudenberg
- Abri de Reyerswiller

Peacetime barracks and support:

- Camp de Bitche.

=== Sub-sector of Bitche ===
37th Fortress Infantry Regiment (37^{e} Régiment d'Infanterie de Forteresse (RIF)), Lt. Colonel Combert, command post at Schimberg.

- Ouvrage Schiesseck (Ouvrage A), gros ouvrage O350 of eight combat blocks and two entry blocks
- Ouvrage Otterbiel (Ouvrage B), petit ouvrage O400 of four combat blocks and an entry block
- Casemate du Champ-d'Aviation Ouest
- Casemate du Champ-d'Aviation Est
- Abri du Kindelberg
- Casemate de Rochat Est
- Casemate de Rochat Est
- Casemate du Petit-Hohékirkel
- Casemate du Grand-Hohékirkel Ouest
- Casemate du Grand-Hohékirkel Est
- Abri du Camp.

Peacetime barracks and support:

- Camp de Bitche.

== History ==
=== Battle of France ===
Simserhof fired for the first time on 12 October 1939, when a 75mm gun turret supported troops 12 kilometres (7.5 mi) in front of the fortified line. On 10 May 1940, Germany launched the Blitzkrieg against the West, but in front of the Maginot Line, the front remained calm. On 12 May, Simserhof responded to the bombardment of advanced French posts.

In early June in the face of the German assault, all fortress units attached to the Fifth Army were ordered to prepare for withdrawal to the south and west. While fortress units under the 2nd, 3rd and 8th Armies received categorical instructions to prepare to sabotage their positions and conduct an orderly retreat from 14 to 17 June, Fifth Army commander General Bourret's instructions to the SFs Rohrbach, Vosges, Haguenau and Lower Rhine were not as definitive. The personnel of the SF Rohrbach were to be consolidated into a Division de Marche entitled the DM Chastanet, consisting of the 37th, 153rd and 166th RIFs, along with the 207th CISF (compagnie d'infaterie du secteur fortifié) and the 59th RARF (régiment d'artillerie de la région fortifée). On 13 June the troops of the field army in the intervals between fortifications began to withdraw towards the south. A partial withdrawal of fortress troops took place in the SF Rohrbach, with some battalions of each fortress infantry regiment remaining in their positions until the armistice to cover the withdrawal of the interval troops and the fortress infantry assigned to the divisions de marche. The DM Chastenet was assigned to the 43rd Fortress Army Corps. According to the plan, Simserhof would cover the withdrawal and the garrison troops would withdraw in turn after sabotaging the equipment. Simserhof provided covering fire from 15 June, but by the 16th it was apparent that the retreat was nearly impossible.

Rohrbach made contact with German forces on 15 June 1940, when a patrol from the ouvrage ran into German troops of the 262nd Infantry Division, resulting in the death of Lieutenant Damour, in charge of the patrol, and one other French soldier. Later in the day the sector's positions were ordered to prepare to withdraw, sabotaging their equipment before leaving. On the 16th the Germans sent large formations through the gap they had exploited in the Sarre valley, moving behind the Maginot Line. By the 17th Rohrbach was surrounded. On 19 June German infiltrators in the vicinity of Rohrbach were fired upon by Simserhof.

From 20 June the German 262nd Infantry Division, penetrating at the SF Sarre, was able to move at will behind French lines. On 21 June 262nd attacked Welschof, taking return fire from Simserhof's 75 mm gun turret. Welschof spotted counter-battery fire for the SF Sarre's Ouvrage Haut-Poirier against a German 150 mm gun. However, Haut-Poirier surrendered at 2200 hours on the 21st, leaving the western flank of the SF Rohrbach exposed. During the morning of 22 June the Germans assembled a battery of light artillery to attack Welschhof. The 75 mm turret at Simserhof fired in support of the Welschhof block. The Germans moved two 150 mm guns from the entrance to Simmerhof and began to attack Block 1 at Welschhof and Casemate Ouest de Singling. 111 150mm rounds were fired at the façade of Block 1, breaching it, but the covering fire from Simserhof Block 5 continued to prevent the Germans from attacking the top of the block. On the morning of 24 June the Germans gained and Simserhof, at the limit of its range with a contrary wind, could not fire effectively on the top of Welschhof. Having learned of the fall of the Casemate de Bining, which protected Welschhof's flank, Welschhof's commander decided to surrender at 10:00. Both Rohrbach and Simserhof continued to fire back at the Germans, ceasing fire at midnight in accordance with the terms of the Second Armistice at Compiègne.

Earlier on the 24th, Simserhof protected Rohrbach against German attack, firing approximately 13,500 shells in defense of its neighbor. The fate of the garrisons under the armistice terms remained ambiguous. The Germans tried to negotiate with the ouvrages but were rebuffed each time, as the commanders of the ouvrages awaited orders from their superiors. On 30 June, at a meeting at Grand-Hohekirkel, Lt. Colonel Simon brought the ouvrage commanders the order to relinquish their fortifications to the victors.

Schiesseck and Otterbiel saw relatively little action in 1940 compared to their neighbors, and surrendered to the Germans with the rest of the Bitche fortifications on 30 June 1940. Following the surrender, Simserhof was used by the Germans as a storage facility for torpedoes.

==== Units ====
The 37th Fortress Infantry Regiment (the Régiment des Vosges) was composed of four battalions. The first battalion was a field unit, while the other three were placed in fortifications. The regiment was assigned to the Bitche sub-sector, occupying Schiesseck and Otterbiel, as well as nearby casemates. In June 1940, accordance with instructions to withdraw from the frontier, the field units of the 37th joined the division de marche Chastanet, withdrawing through Sarrebourg to Lorquin along the Marne–Rhine Canal. On 17–18 June the unités de marche withdrew further to the area of Donon, where they were captured between 21 and 24 June. The units remaining in ouvrages and casemates surrendered on 1 July.

The 153rd Fortress Infantry Regiment (the Régiment de la Sarre) occupied the casemates of the Légeret sub-sector. From 13 June the regiment's interval units joined the DM Chastanet, retreating to the Marne-Rhine Canal in an attempt to form a defensive line. The regiment was forced to continue its retreat, falling back to Donon where it surrendered 21–22 June, while the casemate troops back on the Line surrendered on 30 June.

The 166th Fortress Infantry Regiment was stationed on the Bining sub-sector, in Welschhof, Rohrbach and five casemates. The interval troops joined the DM Chastanet, falling back to the Marne-Rhine Canal, then to the Saint-Quirin forest where they were captured on 23 June. The casemates on the Line were captured with Welschhoff 21–24 June, Rohrbach holding out until the armistice and surrendering in its turn on 30 June.

=== 1944-45 ===
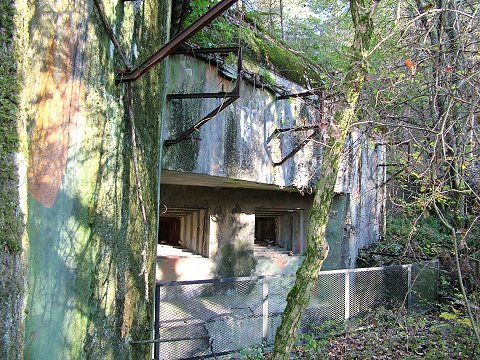
Otterbiel Block 2

American forces reached the Bitche area at the very end of 1944. At the end of November the U.S. Seventh Army under General Alexander Patch pursued the Germans. Simserhof was occupied by elements of the German 25th Panzer Grenadier Division.

From 15 November the U.S. 44th Infantry Division assaulted Simserhof, using tank destroyers to fire at firing apertures in block 5. Combat engineers were assigned to attack individual blocks. The Germans abandoned Simserhof by an emergency exit after booby-trapping the installations during the night of 19–20 November. The 44th Infantry yielded to the U.S. 100th Infantry Division, which occupied the ouvrage during the first days of 1945.

Schiesseck was occupied by elements of the German 25th Panzer Grenadier Division. From 17 November the 100th Infantry Division assaulted Schiesseck, in December after an aerial and artillery bombardment, even using captured German 8.8cm guns and 8" howitzers. The most effective bombardment used American tank destroyers in direct fire against the position's embrasures. By late on the 18th the Americans occupied the surface in all areas except Block 2, which resisted until 20 December. The following day tank-dozers covered the firing positions and ditches.

The U.S. 397th Infantry Regiment took up positions around Welschof, with no resistance from the ouvrage, which was not occupied by the Germans. Rohrbach was liberated by advancing American forces on 10 December 1944, after the German evacuated, sabotaging the installation.

Otterbiel was occupied by elements of the German 25th Panzer Grenadier Division. Otterbiel was to be the next position to be attacked by the 100th ID, but the American advance was interrupted by the Battle of the Bulge in late December, followed by the German counter-offensive Operation Nordwind. The Seventh Army was pulled back to occupy positions previously held by the U.S. Third Army, abandoning Schiesseck. The 100th returned on 15 March 1945 and attacked the area on a broad front. Because Schiesseck's visible installations had been effectively destroyed in December, the ouvrage itself played no role in the German defense. Otterbiel was lightly defended, and the Americans, backed up by heavy artillery, were able to capture Otterbiel and the Ensemble de Bitche with few casualties. Bitche was finally liberated on 16 March 1945.

=== Môle de Bitche ===
By 1951 work was proceeding on renovation of many of the northeastern ouvrages, including Welschhof, Rohrbach, Schiesseck, Otterbiel and Simserhof, with the aim of restoring their combat capability to block a potential advance by the Warsaw Pact. The positions were designated the môle de Bitche, a fortified strongpoint. Schiesseck, Otterbiel and Grand-Hohékirkel (in the SF Vosges), located at the Camp de Bitche army training center, were used for training in fortress systems and weapons.

After the establishment of the French nuclear strike force, the importance of the Line declined. The positions in the SF Rohrbach were quickly disposed of or abandoned. Rohrbach and Welschhof were among the first positions to be deactivated, in 1970. Simserhof was first proposed as a potential museum in the 1960s, becoming one in the 1980s. Schiesseck and Otterbiel were not staffed or maintained after the early 1970s.

== Present status ==
Rohrbach and Simserhof have been preserved and may be visited by the public. Rohrbach, or "Fort Casso" has been operated by the Association Fort Casso since 1989. Simserhof, while remaining the property of the Ministry of Defense, is managed by the Moselle département and the city of Bitche.

Schiesseck's entrances are visible from the road, but the combat blocks are located on military land and are not accessible. Welschhof is presently abandoned. Otterbiel is on military land and is not accessible to the public. It is reportedly used for ammunition storage.

== Bibliography ==
- Allcorn, William. The Maginot Line 1928-45. Oxford: Osprey Publishing, 2003. ISBN 1-84176-646-1
- Degon, André; Zylberyng, Didier, La Ligne Maginot: Guide des Forts à Visiter, Editions Ouest-France, 2014. ISBN 978-2-7373-6080-0 (in French)
- Kaufmann, J.E. and Kaufmann, H.W. Fortress France: The Maginot Line and French Defenses in World War II, Stackpole Books, 2006. ISBN 0-275-98345-5
- Kaufmann, J.E., Kaufmann, H.W., Jancovič-Potočnik, A. and Lang, P. The Maginot Line: History and Guide, Pen and Sword, 2011. ISBN 978-1-84884-068-3
- Mary, Jean-Yves; Hohnadel, Alain; Sicard, Jacques. Hommes et Ouvrages de la Ligne Maginot, Tome 1. Paris, Histoire & Collections, 2001. ISBN 2-908182-88-2 (in French)
- Mary, Jean-Yves; Hohnadel, Alain; Sicard, Jacques. Hommes et Ouvrages de la Ligne Maginot, Tome 3. Paris, Histoire & Collections, 2003. ISBN 2-913903-88-6 (in French)
- Mary, Jean-Yves; Hohnadel, Alain; Sicard, Jacques. Hommes et Ouvrages de la Ligne Maginot, Tome 5. Paris, Histoire & Collections, 2009. ISBN 978-2-35250-127-5 (in French)
- Romanych, Marc; Rupp, Martin. Maginot Line 1940: Battles on the French Frontier. Oxford: Osprey Publishing, 2010. ISBN 1-84176-646-1
