= Altwiller =

Altwiller Àltwiller
- Commune
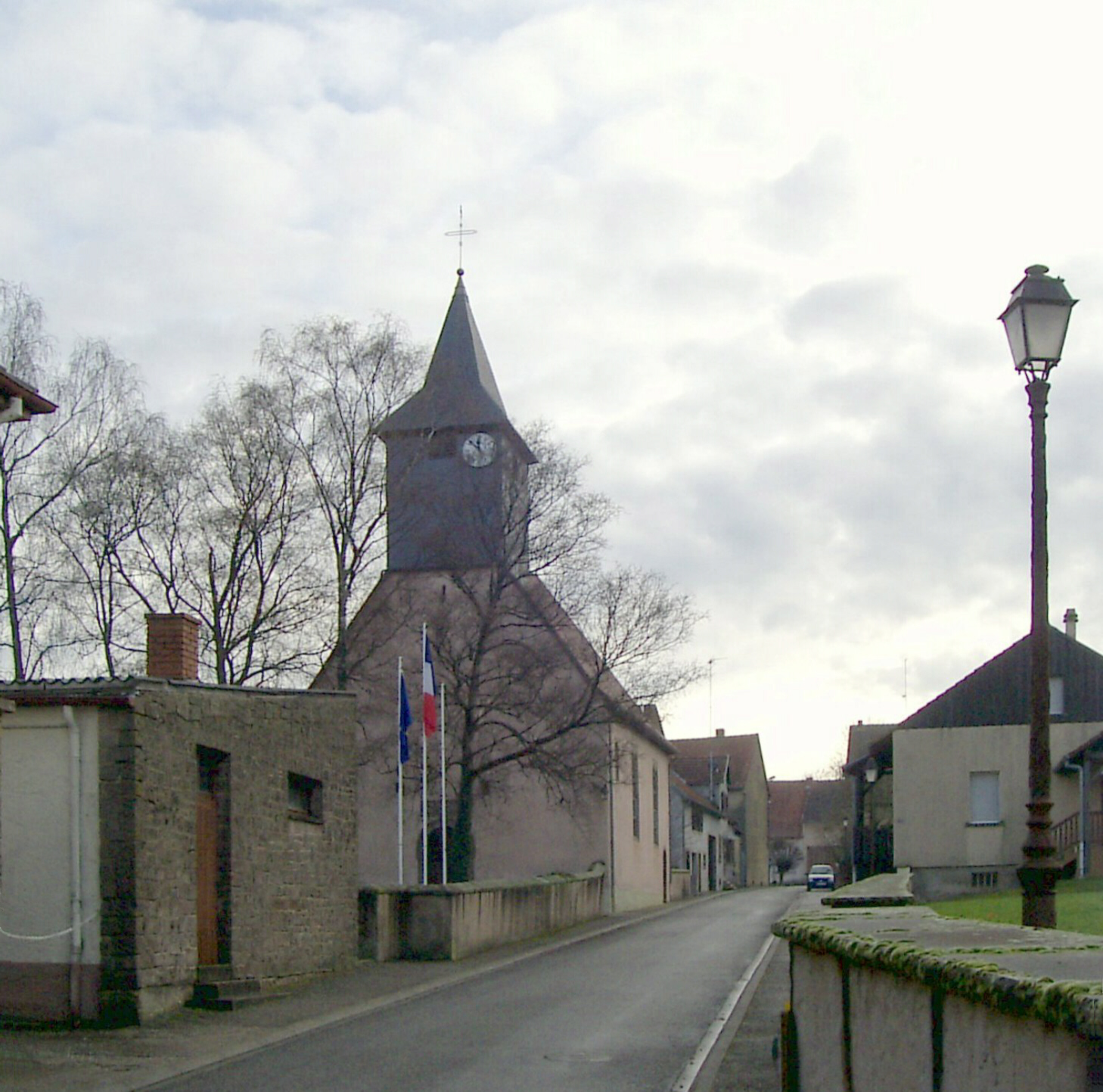
- The Protestant Church

- Coat of arms
- Location of Altwiller
- Location within France Location within Grand Est
- Coordinates: 48°55′51″N 6°58′51″E
- Country: France
- Region: Grand Est
- Department: Bas-Rhin
- Arrondissement: Saverne
- Canton: Ingwiller

Government
  - Mayor (2020–2026): Aimé Schreiner
- Area^{1}: 16.22 km^{2} (6.26 sq mi)
- Highest elevation: 266 m (873 ft)
- Lowest elevation: 215 m (705 ft)
- Population (2023): 373
  - Density: 23.0/km^{2} (59.6/sq mi)
- Time zone: UTC+01:00 (CET)
  - Summer (DST): UTC+02:00 (CEST)
- INSEE/Postal code: 67009 /67260
- ^{1} French Land Register data, which excludes lakes, ponds, glaciers > 1 km^{2} (0.386 sq mi or 247 acres) and river estuaries.

Altwiller (French pronunciation: [altvilɛʁ]; German: Altweiler) is a commune in the Bas-Rhin department in the Grand Est region of northeastern France.

== Geography ==
Altwiller is located some 20 km south of Sarreguemines on the German border and some 50 km north-east of Nancy. The commune is accessed by the D23 road running east from Vibersviller to the village then continuing east to Harskirchen. The D153 road also runs through the southern portion of the commune as it runs from the D39 road in the south-west north-east to Harskirchen. The western and northern borders of the commune are also the borders between the Bas-Rhin and Moselle departments. As well as Altwiller village there is also the hamlet of Chateau Bonnefontaine in the south of the commune.

The Canal des Houllietes de la Satre passes along the southern border of the commune. The Rose stream passes near the village flowing west from Moselle to the Albe river partly forming the northern border of the commune. The northern part of the commune is farmland while the southern part is mainly forested.

== History ==
Fragments of vases and other Gallo-Roman pieces have been found at Bonnefontaine. The site is located on the salt route. In addition to the two annexes of Neuweyershof and the Bonnefontaine domain the village had in its vicinity a hamlet called Honkesen-Huntzen which has now disappeared.

Altwiller was deserted in the 15th century and rebuilt a little later in 1559 mainly by Huguenots from Lorraine. It was partially destroyed again in 1635 by the Croatians then became the property of Sarrewerden then of Nassau-Saarbrücken with the capital of the Bailiwick of Harskirchen. The village returned to France in 1793.

=== Heraldry ===
Arms of Altwiller	Blazon: Azure, a lion party per fess Or and Argent..

== Administration ==
List of Successive Mayors of Altwiller

From	To	Name	Party	Position
1989	2001	Arthur Scwartz		Brigadier-General, Legion of Honour, Commander of National Order of Merit
2001	2008	Gilbert Schmidt		
2008	2014	Alain Lieb		
2014	2026	Aimé Schreiner		

== Demography ==
The inhabitants of the commune are known as Altwillerois or Altwilleroises in French.

Historical population

Year	Pop.	±% p.a.
1793	603	—
1800	698	+2.11%
1806	702	+0.10%
1821	777	+0.68%
1831	796	+0.24%
1836	821	+0.62%
1841	844	+0.55%
1846	795	−1.19%
1851	809	+0.35%
1856	752	−1.45%
1861	756	+0.11%
1866	773	+0.45%
1872	782	+0.19%
1875	775	−0.30%
1880	753	−0.57%
1885	728	−0.67%
1890	767	+1.05%
1895	751	−0.42%
1900	712	−1.06%

Year	Pop.	±% p.a.
1905	661	−1.48%
1910	657	−0.12%
1921	641	−0.22%
1926	549	−3.05%
1931	529	−0.74%
1936	509	−0.77%
1946	487	−0.44%
1954	505	+0.45%
1962	474	−0.79%
1968	456	−0.64%
1975	416	−1.30%
1982	414	−0.07%
1990	415	+0.03%
1999	399	−0.44%
2007	412	+0.40%
2012	418	+0.29%
2017	395	−1.13%
2023	373	−0.95%

Source: EHESS and INSEE

== Culture and heritage ==
=== Civil heritage ===
The commune has many buildings and structures that are registered as historical monuments:

- A House at Bonnefontaine (1908)
- A Farmhouse at Bonnefontaine (18th century)
- A Farmhouse at Neuweyerhof (1) (1761)
- A Farmhouse at Neuweyerhof (2) (1761)
- A Farmhouse at 63 Rue des Lilas (1850)
- A Farmhouse at 103 Rue Principale (1900)
- A Farmhouse at 107 Rue Principale (1776)
- A Farmhouse at 112 Rue Principale (1848)
- A Farmhouse at 113 Rue Principale (18th century)
- A Farmhouse at 114 Rue Principale (1813)
- A Farmhouse at 5 Rue Principale (1776)
- A Flour Mill at 51 Rue Principale (1724). From the end of the 17th to the 20th century the mill was run by a single family of millers.
- A House and Shop at 88 Rue Principale (1934)
- A Farmhouse at 89 Rue Principale (1838)
- A School at 93 Rue Principale (1843)
- A Farmhouse at 20 Rue de la Rose (1826)
- A Farmhouse at 22 Rue de la Rose (18th century)
- A Farmhouse at 26 Rue de la Rose (1862)
- A Farmhouse at 31 Rue de la Rose (1898)
- A Farmhouse at 36 Rue de la Rose (1875)
- A Farmhouse at 41 Rue de la Rose (1909)
- A Carpenter's House at 43 Rue de la Rose (1775)
- The Domain of Bonnefontaine at Bonnefontaine (19th century)
- The Chateau of Bonnefontaine (1818). The mineral water spring discovered in 1603 was appetizing, diuretic and purgative. This gave the idea in 1816 to a banker from Basel to build a thermal spa with castle, park and dance hall. The castle was built between 1818 and 1822 but the operation ended in failure due to lack of customers. He sold the estate in 1836. The latest occupants of the castle are the Schlumberger family - owners since 1878.
- The Chateau of Bonnefontaine Park (1818)
- The Canal des Houillères Lock 16 (19th century)
- A School at Neuweyerhof (19th century)
- Houses and Farms

=== Religious heritage ===
The commune has several religious buildings and structures that are registered as historical monuments:

- The Protestant Church (1723). There are several items in the church that are registered as historical objects:
  - The Organ (1868)
  - The Furniture in the Church
  - A Communion Ewer (18th century)
  - A Baptismal Ewer (1894)
- The Protestant Presbytery (1730)
- The Lutheran Presbytery (16th century)
- The Cemetery at RD 23. (19th century) The movable items in the cemetery are registered as historical objects.

== See also ==
- Communes of the Bas-Rhin department
