= Ouvrage Otterbiel =

Forms part of the Maginot Line I'm Rohrbach

- Part of Maginot Line
- Northeast France
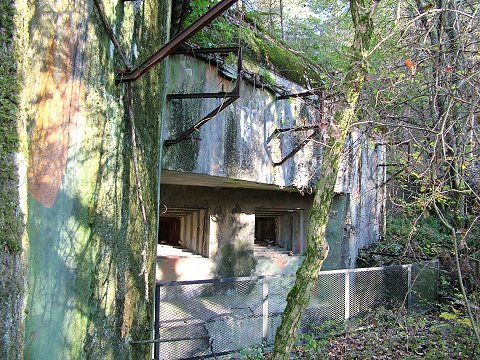
- Front of Block 2: the embrasure on the right is equipped with an AC 47 anti-tank gun

Site information
- Owner: French Army
- Controlled by: France

Location
- Coordinates: 49.06333°N 7.43972°E

Site history
- Built by: CORF
- Materials: Concrete, steel, deep excavation
- Battles/wars: Battle of France, Lorraine Campaign, Battle of the Bulge

Ouvrage Otterbiel forms part of the Maginot Line in the Fortified Sector of Rohrbach, Sub-sector of Bitche, and is located on the Camp de Bitche of the French Army. It is located between gros ouvrage Schiesseck and petit ouvrage Grand Hohekirkel. Part of the Fortified Sector of Rohrbach, the petit ouvrage comprises four combat blocks and an entry block. Due to budget restrictions, a planned flanking infantry block was never constructed. Otterbiel saw no significant action in the Battle of France, and limited action during the 1944/45 Lorraine Campaign. It was renovated for use during the Cold War. Otterbiel is used for ammunition storage by the French Army.

== Design and construction ==
The site was surveyed by Commission d'Organisation des Régions Fortifiées (CORF), the Maginot Line's design and construction agency, and was approved for construction in August 1931. The petit ouvrage (Note: English-language sources use the French term ouvrage as the preferred term for the Maginot positions, in preference to "fort", a term usually reserved for older fortifications with passive defenses in the form of walls and ditches. The literal translation of ouvrage in the sense of a fortification in English is "work." A gros ouvrage is a large fortification with a significant artillery component, while a petit ouvrage is smaller, with lighter arms.) was initially planned as a gros ouvrage with additional blocks for an 81mm mortar turret and two 75mm gun casemates, as well as a separate personnel entry.

== Description ==
Otterbiel is unusual for having an artillery block in a petit ouvrage, a vestige of its original intention as a gros ouvrage. It also possesses three infantry blocks and a single entry block.

- Block 1: Infantry block with one retractable twin machine gun turret and one automatic rifle cloche (GFM). Access forbidden.
- Block 2: Infantry block with two GFM cloches, one grenade launcher cloche (LG), one twin machine gun cloche (JM), one twin machine gun embrasure and one machine gun (JM)/47mm anti-tank gun embrasure (JM/AC47). Access forbidden.
- Block 3: Infantry block with two GFM cloches, one JM cloche, one 81mm mortar turret, one twin machine gun embrasure and one JM/AC47 embrasure. Access forbidden.
- Block 4: Infantry block with two GFM cloches and one observation cloche (VDP). Access forbidden.
- Entry block: The entry provides for personnel and ammunition on one unit, with munitions arriving by truck. It is protected by two GFM cloches and a machine gun/47mm anti-tank gun (JM/AC47) embrasure, which was never provided due to a lack of funding; only a machine gun was provided.

=== Casemates and shelters ===
A series of detached casemates and infantry shelters are in the vicinity of Otterbiel, including

- Casemate du Champ d'Aviation Ouest: Single block with one JM/AC37 embrasure, one twin machine gun embrasure and a GFM cloche.
- Casemate du Champ d'Aviation Est: Single block with one JM/AC47 embrasure, one twin machine gun embrasure and a GFM cloche.
- Abri du Kindelberg: Subsurface abri-caverne (Note: An abri is an infantry shelter, sometimes underground or under earth cover. An abri in the main Maginot Line often closely resembles a casemate, but is more lightly armed and can hold more occupants.) with two GFM cloches
- Casemate de Rochat Ouest: Single block with one JM/AC37 embrasure, one twin machine gun embrasure and a GFM cloche.
- Casemate de Rochat Est: Single block with one JM/AC37 embrasure, one twin machine gun embrasure and a GFM cloche.
- Casemate du Petit-Hohékirkel: Single block with one JM/AC37 embrasure, one twin machine gun embrasure and a GFM cloche.
- Casemate du Grand-Hohékirkel Ouest: Single block with one JM/AC37 embrasure, one twin machine gun embrasure and a GFM cloche.
- Casemate du Grand-Hohékirkel Est: Single block with one JM/AC37 embrasure, one twin machine gun embrasure and a GFM cloche.
- Abri du Camp: Surface abri with two GFM cloches.

== Manning ==
In 1939 the garrison comprised 98 men and 7 officers of the 37th Fortress Infantry Regiment under the command of Captain Le Guanec. The units were under the umbrella of the 5th Army The Casernement de Bitche provided peacetime above-ground barracks and support services to Otterbiel and other positions in the area.

== History ==
See Fortified Sector of Rohrbach for a broader discussion of the Rohrbach sector of the Maginot Line.

=== 1940 ===
Otterbiel saw relatively little action in 1940 compared to its neighbors, and surrendered to the Germans with the rest of the Bitche fortifications on 30 June 1940.

=== 1944 and 1945 ===
At the end of November 1944 the U.S. Seventh Army under General Alexander Patch had reached the Vosges region. Otterbiel was occupied by elements of the German 25th Panzer Grenadier Division. Otterbiel was to be the next position to be attacked by the U.S. 100th Infantry Division, but the planned operation was disrupted by the Battle of the Bulge. The Seventh Army withdrew to cover areas vacated by the U.S. Third Army, which moved to confront the German offensive.

The 100th returned in March 1945 attacked the area on a broad front. Otterbiel was lightly defended, and the Americans, backed up by heavy artillery, were able to capture Otterbiel and the Ensemble de Bitche with few casualties.

=== Cold War ===
Following World War II, interest revived in the use of the Maginot Line to defend against a possible Soviet advance through southern Germany. Funds were allocated for restoration of the gros ouvrages, but work was limited to restoration of systems and improvements to existing armament, with work completed by 1953. By 1953, Otterbiel had been designated part of the Mòle de Bitche, a strongpoint in the northeastern defenses against Soviet attack. By the late 1950s interest in fixed fortifications was waning after France developed a nuclear deterrent. The money needed to maintain and upgrade the fortifications was diverted for the nuclear programs. Otterbiel was not manned or maintained after the early 1970s

== Present condition ==
Otterbiel is on military land and is not accessible to the public. It is reportedly used for ammunition storage.

== See also ==
- List of all works on Maginot Line
- Siegfried Line
- Atlantic Wall
- Czechoslovak border fortifications

== Bibliography ==
- Allcorn, William. The Maginot Line 1928-45. Oxford: Osprey Publishing, 2003. ISBN 1-84176-646-1
- Kaufmann, J.E. and Kaufmann, H.W. Fortress France: The Maginot Line and French Defenses in World War II, Stackpole Books, 2006. ISBN 0-275-98345-5
- Kaufmann, J.E., Kaufmann, H.W., Jancovič-Potočnik, A. and Lang, P. The Maginot Line: History and Guide, Pen and Sword, 2011. ISBN 978-1-84884-068-3
- Mary, Jean-Yves; Hohnadel, Alain; Sicard, Jacques. Hommes et Ouvrages de la Ligne Maginot, Tome 1. Paris, Histoire & Collections, 2001. ISBN 2-908182-88-2 (in French)
- Mary, Jean-Yves; Hohnadel, Alain; Sicard, Jacques. Hommes et Ouvrages de la Ligne Maginot, Tome 2. Paris, Histoire & Collections, 2003. ISBN 2-908182-97-1 (in French)
- Mary, Jean-Yves; Hohnadel, Alain; Sicard, Jacques. Hommes et Ouvrages de la Ligne Maginot, Tome 3. Paris, Histoire & Collections, 2003. ISBN 2-913903-88-6 (in French)
- Mary, Jean-Yves; Hohnadel, Alain; Sicard, Jacques. Hommes et Ouvrages de la Ligne Maginot, Tome 5. Paris, Histoire & Collections, 2009. ISBN 978-2-35250-127-5 (in French)
