= Siersthal =

- Commune
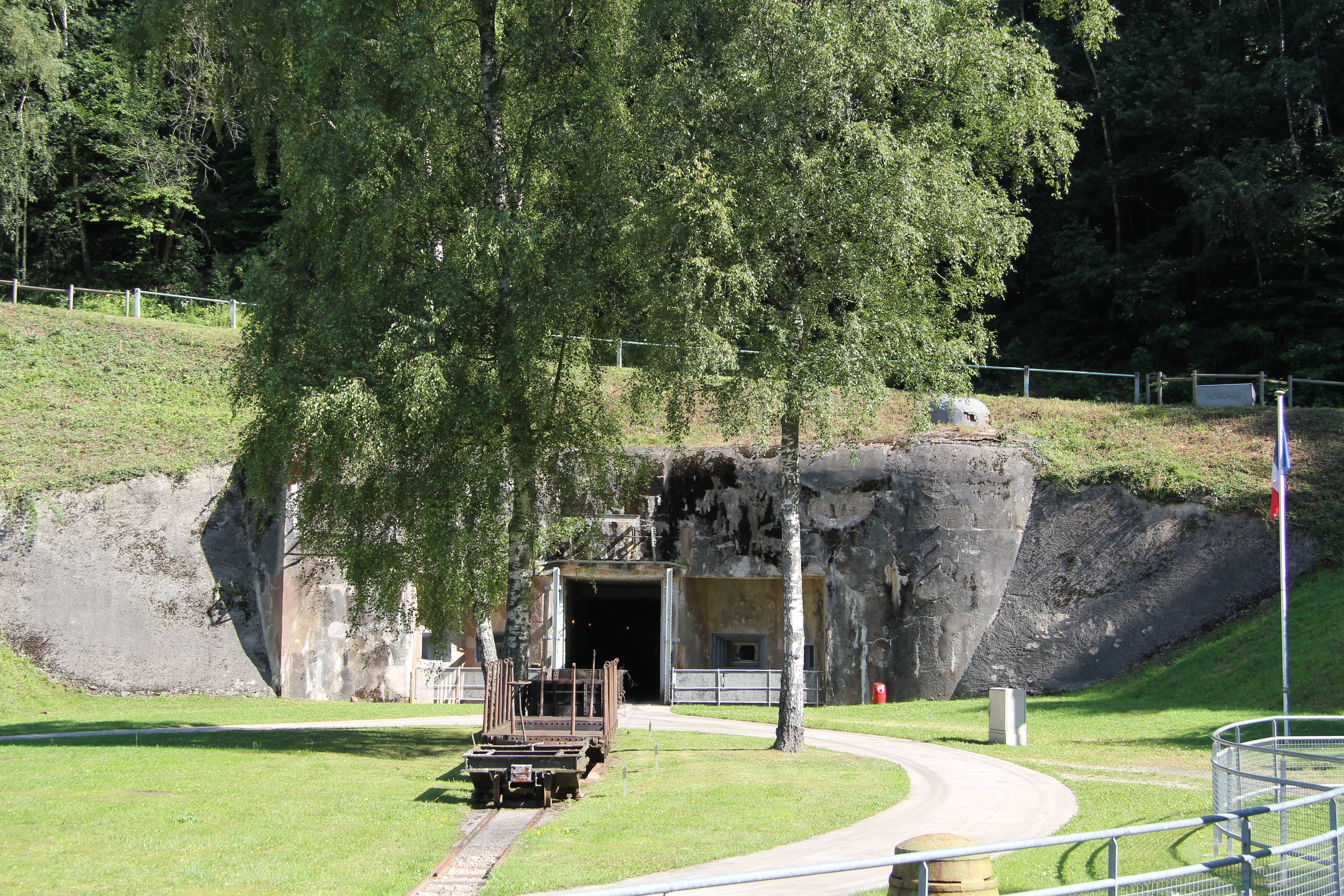
- The Ouvrage Simserhof

- Coat of arms
- Location of Siersthal
- Location within France Location within Grand Est
- Coordinates: 49°02′39″N 7°20′57″E
- Country: France
- Region: Grand Est
- Department: Moselle
- Arrondissement: Sarreguemines
- Canton: Bitche
- Intercommunality: CC du Pays de Bitche

Government
  - Mayor (2020–2026): Daniel Zintz
- Area^{1}: 10.51 km^{2} (4.06 sq mi)
- Elevation: 215 m (705 ft)
- Highest elevation: 403 m (1,322 ft)
- Lowest elevation: 258 m (846 ft)
- Population (2023): 646
  - Density: 61.5/km^{2} (159/sq mi)
- Time zone: UTC+01:00 (CET)
  - Summer (DST): UTC+02:00 (CEST)
- INSEE/Postal code: 57651 /57410
- ^{1} French Land Register data, which excludes lakes, ponds, glaciers > 1 km^{2} (0.386 sq mi or 247 acres) and river estuaries.

Siersthal (French pronunciation: [siʁstal]; Lorraine Franconian: Siirschel) is a commune in the Moselle department of the Grand Est administrative region in north-eastern France.

The village belongs to the Pays de Bitche and to the Northern Vosges Regional Nature Park. It is 10 kilometres (6.2 mi) away from the Franco-German border.

== Geography ==
The area of Siersthal is 10.5 square kilometres (4.1 sq mi), population density is 63.1 inhabitants per square kilometre (163/sq mi).

The map below shows the location of Siersthal with key infrastructure and adjacent municipalities.

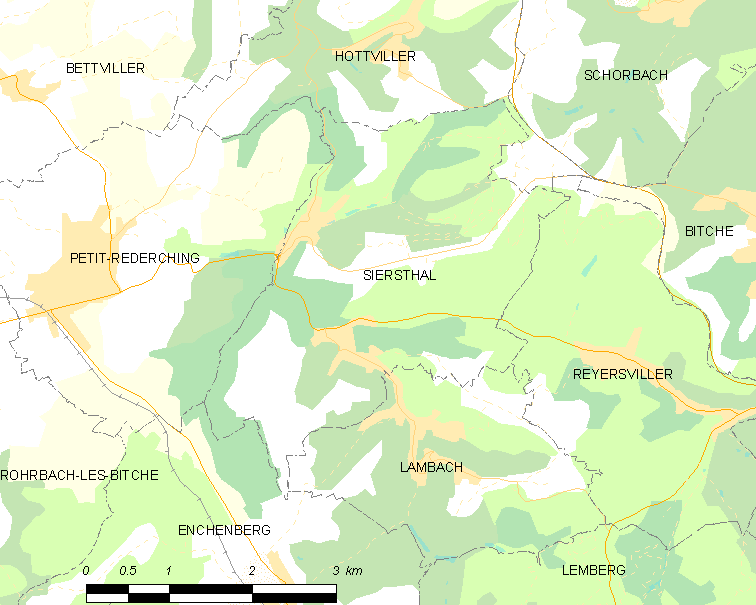

== Population ==
Historical population
Year	Pop.	±% p.a.
1968	591	—
1975	592	+0.02%
1982	656	+1.48%
1990	673	+0.32%
1999	694	+0.34%
2007	653	−0.76%
2012	638	−0.46%
2017	665	+0.83%
2023	646	−0.48%
Source: INSEE

== See also ==
- Communes of the Moselle department
