= Arnold Burmeister =

German Wehrmacht general (1899–1988)

- Born: 28 February 1899; Norburg
- Died: 2 July 1988 (aged 89); Stühlingen
- Military career
- Allegiance: Nazi Germany
- Branch: Army (Wehrmacht)
- Rank: Generalleutnant
- Commands: 25th Panzergrenadier Division
- Conflicts: World War II
- Awards: Knight's Cross of the Iron Cross
- Other work: Bundesgrenzschutz

Arnold Hans Albert Burmeister (28 February 1899 – 2 July 1988) was a German general during World War II who commanded the 25th Panzergrenadier Division. He was a recipient of the Knight's Cross of the Iron Cross of Nazi Germany.

== Awards and decorations ==
- Knight's Cross of the Iron Cross on 14 April 1945 as Generalmajor and commander of 25. Panzergrenadier-Division

Military offices
| Preceded by Generalleutnant Paul Schürmann | Commander of 25. Panzergrenadier Division; 10 February 1945 - 8 May 1945 | Succeeded by None |
