= Ouvrage Rohrbach =

- Part of Maginot Line
- Northeast France, New Fronts
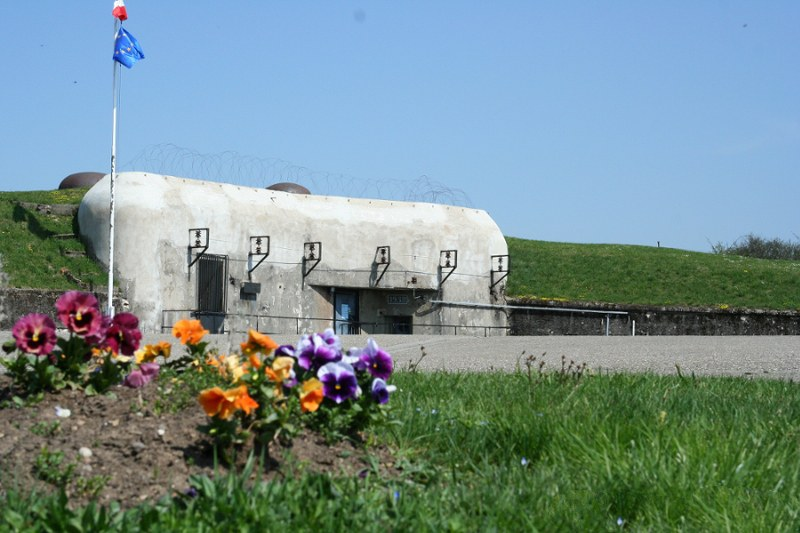
- Ouvrage Rohrbach

Site information
- Controlled by: France
- Open to the public: Yes

Location
- Coordinates: 49.06139°N 7.27°E

Site history
- Built by: CORF
- In use: Preserved
- Materials: Concrete, steel, deep excavation
- Battles/wars: Battle of France, Lorraine Campaign

Ouvrage Rohrbach (or Fort Casso) is a petit ouvrage of the Maginot Line located in the community of Bettvillier, near Rohrbach-lès-Bitche in the Moselle département, facing Germany. The Fortified Sector of Rohrbach was built somewhat later than its neighbors to the east and west, and in company with positions on the extreme western end of the Maginot Line, became one of the "New Fronts."

== Design and construction ==
Early designs contemplated a powerful fortification of thirteen blocks. However, the scale of works in the Rohrbach sector was reduced in 1933 to two gros ouvrages, one petit ouvrage (Rohrbach), fifteen casemates and eight shelters (abris). The fortifications center around the military camp at Bitche and the village of Petit-Réderching. No works were constructed in Rohrbach itself. As a result of the decision of Marshal Pétain in 1929, priority was given to the Vosges and the defense of the plain of Alsace. Aware of the weakness of the area between the rivers Sarre and Lauter, three gros ouvrages were proposed, to be completed between 1929 and 1933. However, in 1934, due to budget restrictions, plans were deferred for artillery blocks at Rohrbach, and only the infantry blocks were ultimately constructed. As the project progressed, it was distributed among Rohrbach and its neighbors.

The site was surveyed by CORF (Commission d'Organisation des Régions Fortifiées), the Maginot Line's design and construction agency, and was approved for construction in June 1934. The petit ouvrage (Note: English-language sources use the French term ouvrage as the preferred term for the Maginot positions, in preference to "fort", a term usually reserved for older fortifications with passive defenses in the form of walls and ditches. The literal translation of ouvrage in the sense of a fortification in English is "work." A gros ouvrage is a large fortification with a significant artillery component, while a petit ouvrage is smaller, with lighter arms.) was to be expanded in a second phase to a gros ouvrage with separate munitions and personnel entries, an "M1" magazine, full underground caserne, two 75mm gun turrets, a 135 mm gun turret, a casemate block with three 75mm guns and a long-range 145mm gun turret.

== Description ==
The town of Rohrbach-lès-Bitche is located on a shelf between the Vosges mountains and the valley of the Sarre, tunneled beneath by plaster mines. The valley extends into Germany and forms a natural axis of attack. The constructed portions of Rohrbach are on the edge of an escarpment, while most of the proposed additional blocks, as well as the entries, were to be located several hundred meters to the rear in a ravine, tunneled under the village.

The ouvrage itself comprises one entrance block and two infantry blocks.

- Block 1: Infantry block with one machine gun (JM)/47mm anti-tank gun embrasure (JM/AC47), two machine gun embrasure (JM), one retractable mixed arms turret and two automatic rifle cloches (GFM).
- Block 2: Infantry block with three automatic rifle embrasures, one mixed arms cloche (AM) and one GFM cloche
- Block 3: Infantry block with two twin machine gun embrasures, one JM/AC437 embrasure, one retractable twin machine gun turret and two GFM cloches.

=== Casemates and shelters ===
A series of detached casemates and infantry shelters are in the vicinity of Rohrbach, including

- Casemate de la Station-de-Rohrbach: Double block with two JM/AC47 embrasures, one twin machine gun embrasure, one AM cloche and two GFM-B cloches.
- Abri de Rohrbach: (Note: An abri is an infantry shelter, sometimes underground or under earth cover. An abri in the main Maginot Line often closely resembles a casemate, but is more lightly armed and can hold more occupants.) Surface shelter or abri with two GFM-B cloches

== Manning ==
In 1939 the garrison comprised 173 men and 3 officers of the 166th Fortress Infantry Regiment under the command of Captain de Saint-Ferjeux. The units were under the umbrella of the 4th Army, Army Group 2. The Casernement de Bining provided peacetime above-ground barracks and support services to Rohrbach and other positions in the area.

== History ==
See Fortified Sector of Rohrbach for a broader discussion of the Rohrbach sector of the Maginot Line.

=== 1940 ===
The garrison at Rohrbach made its first direct contact with German forces on 15 June 1940, when a patrol from the ouvrage ran into German troops of the 262nd Infantry Division, resulting in the death of Lieutenant Damour, in charge of the patrol, and one other French soldier. Later in the day the sector's positions were ordered to prepare to withdraw, sabotaging their equipment before leaving. On the 16th the Germans sent large formations through the gap they had exploited in the Sarre valley, moving behind the Maginot Line. By the 17th Rohrbach was surrounded. On 19 June infiltrators in the vicinity of Rohrbach were fired upon by Simserhof.

On the 21st a large-scale attack was opened against Welschhof, which was interrupted by fire from Simserhof. Haut-Poirier, farther to the west and out of range of Simserhof, was forced to surrender. Further firing occurred on the 22nd and 23rd, while individual casemates were assaulted by the Germans and taken. Both Rohrbach and Simserhof continued to fire back at the Germans on the 24th, ceasing fire at midnight in accordance with the terms of the Second Armistice at Compiègne. The garrison formally surrendered on 30 June.

=== 1944 ===
Rohrbach was liberated by advancing American forces on 10 December 1944, after the German evacuated, sabotaging the installation.

=== Post-War ===
By 1951 work was proceeding on renovation of many of the northeastern ouvrages, including Rohrbach, with the aim of restoring their combat capability to block a potential advance by the Warsaw Pact. Rohrbach and its neighbors were designated the môle de Bitche, a fortified strongpoint. After the establishment of the French nuclear strike force, the importance of the Line declined. Rohrbach was among the first positions to be deactivated in 1970.

== Preservation ==
From 1987 local residents worked to restore to ouvrage with support from the town of Rohrbach-lès-Bitche. The Association Fort Casso was established in 1989 to support the work. The association presently operates Rohrbach as a museum. The present name memorializes Rohrbach's engineering officer, Lieutenant Casso.

== See also ==
- List of all works on Maginot Line
- Siegfried Line
- Atlantic Wall
- Czechoslovak border fortifications

== Bibliography ==
- Allcorn, William. The Maginot Line 1928-45. Oxford: Osprey Publishing, 2003. ISBN 1-84176-646-1
- Degon, André; Zylberyng, Didier, La Ligne Maginot: Guide des Forts à Visiter, Editions Ouest-France, 2014. ISBN 978-2-7373-6080-0 (in French)
- Kaufmann, J.E. and Kaufmann, H.W. Fortress France: The Maginot Line and French Defenses in World War II, Stackpole Books, 2006. ISBN 0-275-98345-5
- Kaufmann, J.E., Kaufmann, H.W., Jancovič-Potočnik, A. and Lang, P. The Maginot Line: History and Guide, Pen and Sword, 2011. ISBN 978-1-84884-068-3
- Mary, Jean-Yves; Hohnadel, Alain; Sicard, Jacques. Hommes et Ouvrages de la Ligne Maginot, Tome 1. Paris, Histoire & Collections, 2001. ISBN 2-908182-88-2 (in French)
- Mary, Jean-Yves; Hohnadel, Alain; Sicard, Jacques. Hommes et Ouvrages de la Ligne Maginot, Tome 2. Paris, Histoire & Collections, 2003. ISBN 2-908182-97-1 (in French)
- Mary, Jean-Yves; Hohnadel, Alain; Sicard, Jacques. Hommes et Ouvrages de la Ligne Maginot, Tome 3. Paris, Histoire & Collections, 2003. ISBN 2-913903-88-6 (in French)
- Mary, Jean-Yves; Hohnadel, Alain; Sicard, Jacques. Hommes et Ouvrages de la Ligne Maginot, Tome 5. Paris, Histoire & Collections, 2009. ISBN 978-2-35250-127-5 (in French)
