= Casemate de Wittring =

Component of the Maginot Line fortifications in Northeastern France

- Part of Maginot Line
- Northeast France

Site information
- Controlled by: France
- Open to the public: yes

Location
- Coordinates: 49.04869°N 7.14951°E

Site history
- In use: Restored
- Materials: Concrete, steel
- Battles/wars: Battle of France

The Casemate de Wittring is a component of the Maginot Line fortifications in northeastern France. It is located in the Fortified Sector of the Sarre section of the line and was associated with Ouvrage Haut-Poirier, a petit ouvrage of the main Line. Wittring has been restored and is operated as a museum.

The casemate was armed with a machine gun/anti-tank gun embrasure (JM/AC47), one twin machine gun embrasure, two mixed-arms cloches (AM) and two automatic rifle (GFM-B) cloches. Wittring controlled access to dikes and floodgates in the area that were intended to inundate portions of the Sarre valley to block an invasion from Germany.The commander of the casemate in 1940 was Adjutant-Chef Hillaire, in charge of an element of the 133rd Fortress Infantry Regiment (RIF). The Casernement d'Achen provided peacetime above-ground barracks and support services to Wittring and other positions in the area.

== History ==
See Fortified Sector of the Sarre for a broader discussion of the Sarre sector of the Maginot Line.

Wittring was attacked by units of the German 262nd Infantry Division on 21 June 1940 during the Battle of France, surrendering the same day after heavy bombardment.

Wittring was sold to private owners in 1987, with restoration starting in 1992. The association L'Amicale de la Casemate de Wittring restored the destroyed entry with 14 cubic meters of concrete, among other less complex work.

== Current condition ==
The Casemate de Wittring is maintained as a museum and may be visited.
