= Ouvrage Schiesseck =

- Part of Maginot Line
- Northeast France

Site information
- Owner: French Army
- Controlled by: France

Location
- Location within France
- Coordinates: 49.05972°N 7.39917°E

Site history
- Built by: CORF
- In use: Abandoned
- Materials: Concrete, steel, deep excavation
- Battles/wars: Battle of France, Lorraine Campaign, Battle of the Bulge

Ouvrage Schiesseck is a gros ouvrage of the Maginot Line, located near Bitche in the French département of Moselle. Schiesseck is adjoined by gros ouvrage Simserhof and petit ouvrage Otterbiel, all part of the Fortified Sector of Rohrbach, and faces the German frontier. Schiesseck saw comparatively little activity during the Battle of France, surrendering with other positions in its sector on 30 June 1940. During the Lorraine Campaign of 1944 Schiesseck was occupied by German forces and presented a point of resistance to American advances, requiring heavy bombardment and infantry assaults by engineer units to capture. The area was abandoned during the Battle of the Bulge, but was recaptured in March 1945. In the 1950s Schiesseck was repaired as part of a program to re-arm the Maginot Line against a potential advance by Warsaw Pact forces. It was abandoned in the early 1970s. Schiesseck is on military land and is not visitable by the public.

== Design and construction ==
The site was surveyed by CORF (Commission d'Organisation des Régions Fortifiées), the Maginot Line's design and construction agency; Schiesseck was approved for construction in June 1931, after several proposals had been rejected. The gros ouvrage (Note: English-language sources use the French term ouvrage as the preferred term for the Maginot positions, in preference to "fort", a term usually reserved for older fortifications with passive defensives in the form of walls and ditches. The literal translation of ouvrage in the sense of a fortification in English is "work." A gros ouvrage is a large fortification with a significant artillery component, while a petit ouvrage is smaller, with lighter arms.) is of the typical fort palmé ("palm-shaped") form for a large position. The fort palmé is a distributed fortification, with its entrances and underground support areas more than a kilometer to the rear, connected to the combat blocks by a long underground gallery. The "palm" is composed of the grouped combat blocks, linked by galleries to the main trunk.

== Description ==
Schiesseck comprises two separate entrance blocks for ammunition and personnel, four infantry blocks, four artillery blocks and one observation block. The munitions and personnel entries are located far to the rear of the combat blocks. The underground barracks are located at the junction of the two entry galleries. From there a long gallery runs at an average depth of 30 metres (98 ft) to the combat blocks. Schiesseck was served by a 60 cm-gauge narrow-gauge railway, which enters at the munitions entrance and runs all the way out through the galleries to the combat blocks. On the surface, the railway connects to supply points to the rear and to other ouvrages. Schiesseck lacks a large "M1" magazine.

- Block 1: Artillery block with one retractable twin machine gun turret, one automatic rifle cloche (GFM) and one retractable 81mm mortar turret.
- Block 2: Infantry block with one observation cloche (VDP), one GFM cloche, two twin machine gun cloches, one twin machine gun embrasure and one machine gun (JM)/47mm anti-tank gun embrasure (JM/AC47).
- Block 3: Infantry block with two GFM cloches and one VDP cloche.
- Block 4: Artillery block with one GFM cloche, one JM cloche and two 81mm mortar embrasures.
- Block 5: Infantry block with two GFM cloches and one JM cloche.
- Block 6: Infantry block with one GFM cloche and one retractable twin machine gun turret.
- Block 7: Artillery block with one GFM cloche, one LG cloche and one retractable twin 75mm gun turret.
- Block 8: Artillery block with one VDP cloche, one GFM cloche and one retractable twin 135mm gun turret.
- Block 9: Observation block with one VDP cloche and one VDP/observation cloche.
- Personnel entry: Shaft-style entry block with one GFM cloche and one JM/AC47 embrasure.
- Munitions entry: Direct entry block with two GFM cloches and two JM/AC47 embrasures.

=== Casemates and shelters ===
A series of detached casemates and infantry shelters are in the vicinity of Simserhof, including

- Abri du Freudenberg: Subsurface abri-caverne (Note: An abri is an infantry shelter, sometimes underground or under earth cover. An abri in the main Maginot Line often closely resembles a casemate, but is more lightly armed and can hold more occupants.) with two GFM cloches, linked by an underground gallery to the Observatoire du Freudenberg.
- Observatoire du Freudenberg: Observation post with one VP cloche and one GFM cloche.
- Casemate du Freudenberg: SIngle block with one JM/AC47 embrasure, one twin machine gun embrasure and one GFM cloche. The casemate is immediately adjacent to Block 9 and covers the road and the block, but is not connected to the ouvrage.
- Abri de Reyerswiller: Subsurface abri-caverne with two GFM cloches.
- Casemate de Ramstein Ouest: SIngle block with one JM/AC47 embrasure, one twin machine gun embrasure and a GFM cloche.
- Casemate de Ramstein Est: SIngle block with one JM/AC37 embrasure, one twin machine gun embrasure and a GFM cloche.
- 'Observatoire de la Citadelle: Observation post in the Citadel of Bitche, reporting to Schiesseck.

== Manning ==
The 1940 manning of the ouvrage under the command of Chef de Bataillon Stoquer comprised 679 men and 223 officers of the 37th Fortress Infantry Regiment and the 150th Position Artillery Regiment. The units were under the umbrella of the 5th Army. The nearby Casernement du Freudenberg provided peacetime above-ground barracks and support services to Schiesseck and other positions in the area.

== History ==
See Fortified Sector of Rohrbach for a broader discussion of the Rohrbach sector of the Maginot Line.

=== 1940 ===
Schiesseck saw relatively little action in 1940 compared to its neighbors, and surrendered to the Germans with the rest of the Bitche fortifications on 30 June 1940.

=== 1944 and 1945 ===
At the end of November 1944 the U.S. Seventh Army under General Alexander Patch had reached the Vosges region. Schiesseck was occupied by elements of the German 25th Panzer Grenadier Division. On 14 December, the 398th regiment the U.S. 100th Infantry Division assaulted Schiesseck, after an aerial and artillery bombardment, even using captured German 8.8cm guns and 8" howitzers. The most effective bombardment used American tank destroyers in direct fire against the position's embrasures. By late on the 18th the Americans occupied the surface in all areas except Block 2, which resisted until 20 December. The following day tank-dozers covered the firing positions and ditches.

The American advance was interrupted by the Battle of the Bulge in late December. The Seventh Army was pulled back to occupy positions previously held by the U.S. Third Army, abandoning Schiesseck. The 100th returned on 15 March 1945 and attacked the area on a broad front. Because Schiesseck's visible installations had been effectively destroyed in December, the ouvrage itself played no role in the German defense. The area was quickly captured.

=== Cold War ===
Following World War II, interest revived in the use of the Maginot Line to defend against a possible Soviet advance through southern Germany. Funds were allocated for restoration of the gros ouvrages, but work was limited to restoration of systems and improvements to existing armament, with work completed by 1953. In 1951, Schiesseck had been designated part of the Mòle de Bitche, a strongpoint in the northeastern defenses against Soviet attack. By the late 1950s interest in fixed fortifications was waning after France developed a nuclear deterrent. The money needed to maintain and upgrade the fortifications was diverted for the nuclear programs. Schiesseck was not guarded or maintained after the early 1970s.

== Current status ==
Schiesseck's entrances are visible from the road, but the combat blocks are located on military land and are not accessible.

== See also ==
- List of all works on Maginot Line
- Siegfried Line
- Atlantic Wall
- Czechoslovak border fortifications

== Bibliography ==
- Allcorn, William. The Maginot Line 1928-45. Oxford: Osprey Publishing, 2003. ISBN 1-84176-646-1
- Kaufmann, J.E. and Kaufmann, H.W. Fortress France: The Maginot Line and French Defenses in World War II, Stackpole Books, 2006. ISBN 0-275-98345-5
- Kaufmann, J.E., Kaufmann, H.W., Jancovič-Potočnik, A. and Lang, P. The Maginot Line: History and Guide, Pen and Sword, 2011. ISBN 978-1-84884-068-3
- Mary, Jean-Yves; Hohnadel, Alain; Sicard, Jacques. Hommes et Ouvrages de la Ligne Maginot, Tome 1. Paris, Histoire & Collections, 2001. ISBN 2-908182-88-2 (in French)
- Mary, Jean-Yves; Hohnadel, Alain; Sicard, Jacques. Hommes et Ouvrages de la Ligne Maginot, Tome 2. Paris, Histoire & Collections, 2003. ISBN 2-908182-97-1 (in French)
- Mary, Jean-Yves; Hohnadel, Alain; Sicard, Jacques. Hommes et Ouvrages de la Ligne Maginot, Tome 3. Paris, Histoire & Collections, 2003. ISBN 2-913903-88-6 (in French)
- Mary, Jean-Yves; Hohnadel, Alain; Sicard, Jacques. Hommes et Ouvrages de la Ligne Maginot, Tome 5. Paris, Histoire & Collections, 2009. ISBN 978-2-35250-127-5 (in French)
