= Château de Bonnefontaine (Bas-Rhin) =

Château in Bas-Rhin, Grand Est, France

Coordinates: 48°54′28″N 6°59′37″E

Château de Bonnefontaine is a château in Altwiller in the department of Bas-Rhin, France. It was completed between 1818 and 1822. Its neo-classical Palladian portico is decorated with sphinxes.

The mineral water spring was discovered in 1603. This gave the idea in 1816 to a banker from Basel to build a thermal spa with castle, park and dance hall, since destroyed. The banker sold the estate in 1836. Since 1878 it has been owned by the Schlumberger family. It became a listed monument historique in 1991.
