= Ouvrage Haut-Poirier =

- Part of Maginot Line
- Northeast France
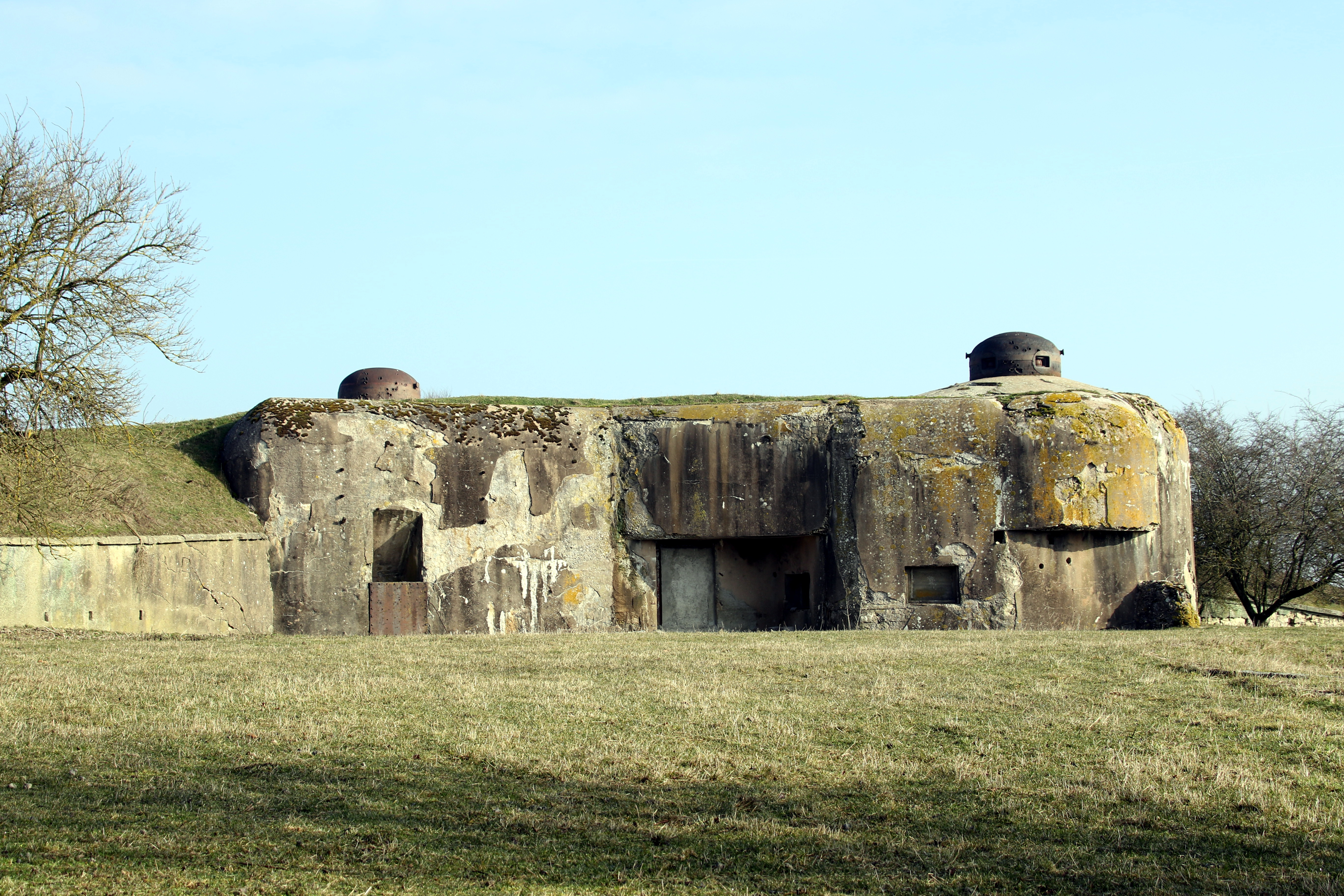

Site information
- Controlled by: France

Location
- Coordinates: 49.04972°N 7.16694°E

Site history
- In use: Museum
- Materials: Concrete, steel, deep excavation
- Battles/wars: Battle of France

Ouvrage Haut-Poirier is a lesser work (petit ouvrage) of the Maginot Line. The ouvrage consists of one entry and three infantry blocks, and is located between the Saare valley and petit ouvrage Welschhof, facing Germany. It is the only ouvrage in the Fortified Sector of the Sarre, the remainder of the area being covered by smaller blockhouses and areas of inundation. It was assaulted by German forces during the Battle of France and was captured after a seven-hour bombardment. Haut-Poirier is abandoned, although one of its satellite casemates is maintained as a museum.

== Design and construction ==
The site was surveyed by CORF (Commission d'Organisation des Régions Fortifiées), the Maginot Line's design and construction agency, and was approved for construction in November 1934. The petit ouvrage (Note: English-language sources use the French term ouvrage as the preferred term for the Maginot positions, in preference to "fort", a term usually reserved for older fortifications with passive defenses in the form of walls and ditches. The literal translation of ouvrage in the sense of a fortification in English is "work." A gros ouvrage is a large fortification with a significant artillery component, while a petit ouvrage is smaller, with lighter arms.) was to be expanded in a second phase to gros ouvrage status with separate personnel and munitions entrances, two 75mm gun turret blocks and a 75mm gun casemate block.

== Description ==
Haut-Poirier comprises three infantry blocks and a small entry block. The blocks are linked by an underground gallery system containing barracks spaces, ammunition storage and utility services. The galleries are excavated at an average depth of up to 30 metres (98 ft). The provisional entry block is located a short distance behind the combat blocks, accessed by a large drain. The proposed new entrances would have been several hundred meters father back.

- Block 1: Infantry block with two automatic rifle cloches (GFM), two mixed arms cloches (AM), and one machine gun/anti-tank gun embrasure (JM/AC47).
- Block 2: Infantry block with one GFM cloche and one retractable mixed arms turret.
- Block 3: Infantry block with two GFM cloches, one mixed arms cloche, one twin machine gun embrasure and two JM/AC 47 embrasures. The block was heavily damaged by German bombardment in 1940.

Haut-Poirier also has two false cloches.

=== Casemates and shelters ===
A series of detached casemates and infantry shelters are in the vicinity of Haut-Poirier, including

- Casemate de Wittring: SIngle block with one JM/AC47 embrasure, one twin machine gun embrasure, two AM cloches and two GFM-B cloches.
- Casemate du Grand-Bois: SIngle block with one JM/AC47 embrasure, one twin machine gun embrasure, one AM cloche and two GFM-B cloches.
- Casemate de Nord-Ouest d'Achen: Double block with two JM/AC47 embrasures, one twin machine gun embrasure, one AM cloche and two GFM-B cloches.
- Casemate de Nord d'Achen: Double block with two JM/AC47 embrasures, two twin machine gun embrasures, one AM cloche and two GFM-B cloches.
- Casemate de Nord-Est d'Achen: Double block with two JM/AC47 embrasures, two twin machine gun embrasures, one AM cloche and two GFM-B cloches.

== Manning ==
The 1940 manning of the ouvrage under the command of Captain Gambotti comprised 158 men and 3 officers of the 133rd Fortress Infantry Regiment. The units were under the umbrella of the 4th Army, Army Group 2. The Casernement d'Achen provided peacetime above-ground barracks and support services to Haut-Poirier and other positions in the area.

== History ==
See Fortified Sector of the Sarre for a broader discussion of the events of 1940 in the Sarre sector of the Maginot Line.

On 15 June 1940 German forces broke through the Saar gap. The German 262nd Infantry Division approached Haut-Poirier from the rear on 21 June. The Germans opened fire with 150 mm artillery at 1500 hours, concentrating on Block 3. Without artillery support from a gros ouvrage, and with Blocks 1 and 2 were unable to intervene, their fire blocked by terrain, Haut-Poirier surrendered at 2200 hours. The casemates nearby surrendered at the same time.

After the June 1940 armistice the Germans stripped Haut-Poirier of all equipment. The ouvrage was in poor condition after the war and was not chosen for renovation.

== Current condition ==
Haut-Poirier is on private property and is sealed to access. The Casemate de Wittring is maintained as a museum and may be visited.

== See also ==
- List of all works on Maginot Line
- Siegfried Line
- Atlantic Wall
- Czechoslovak border fortifications

== Bibliography ==
- Allcorn, William. The Maginot Line 1928-45. Oxford: Osprey Publishing, 2003. ISBN 1-84176-646-1
- Kaufmann, J.E. and Kaufmann, H.W. Fortress France: The Maginot Line and French Defenses in World War II, Stackpole Books, 2006. ISBN 0-275-98345-5
- Kaufmann, J.E., Kaufmann, H.W., Jancovič-Potočnik, A. and Lang, P. The Maginot Line: History and Guide, Pen and Sword, 2011. ISBN 978-1-84884-068-3
- Mary, Jean-Yves; Hohnadel, Alain; Sicard, Jacques. Hommes et Ouvrages de la Ligne Maginot, Tome 1. Paris, Histoire & Collections, 2001. ISBN 2-908182-88-2 (in French)
- Mary, Jean-Yves; Hohnadel, Alain; Sicard, Jacques. Hommes et Ouvrages de la Ligne Maginot, Tome 2. Paris, Histoire & Collections, 2003. ISBN 2-908182-97-1 (in French)
- Mary, Jean-Yves; Hohnadel, Alain; Sicard, Jacques. Hommes et Ouvrages de la Ligne Maginot, Tome 3. Paris, Histoire & Collections, 2003. ISBN 2-913903-88-6 (in French)
- Mary, Jean-Yves; Hohnadel, Alain; Sicard, Jacques. Hommes et Ouvrages de la Ligne Maginot, Tome 5. Paris, Histoire & Collections, 2009. ISBN 978-2-35250-127-5 (in French)
