= Harskirchen =

- Commune
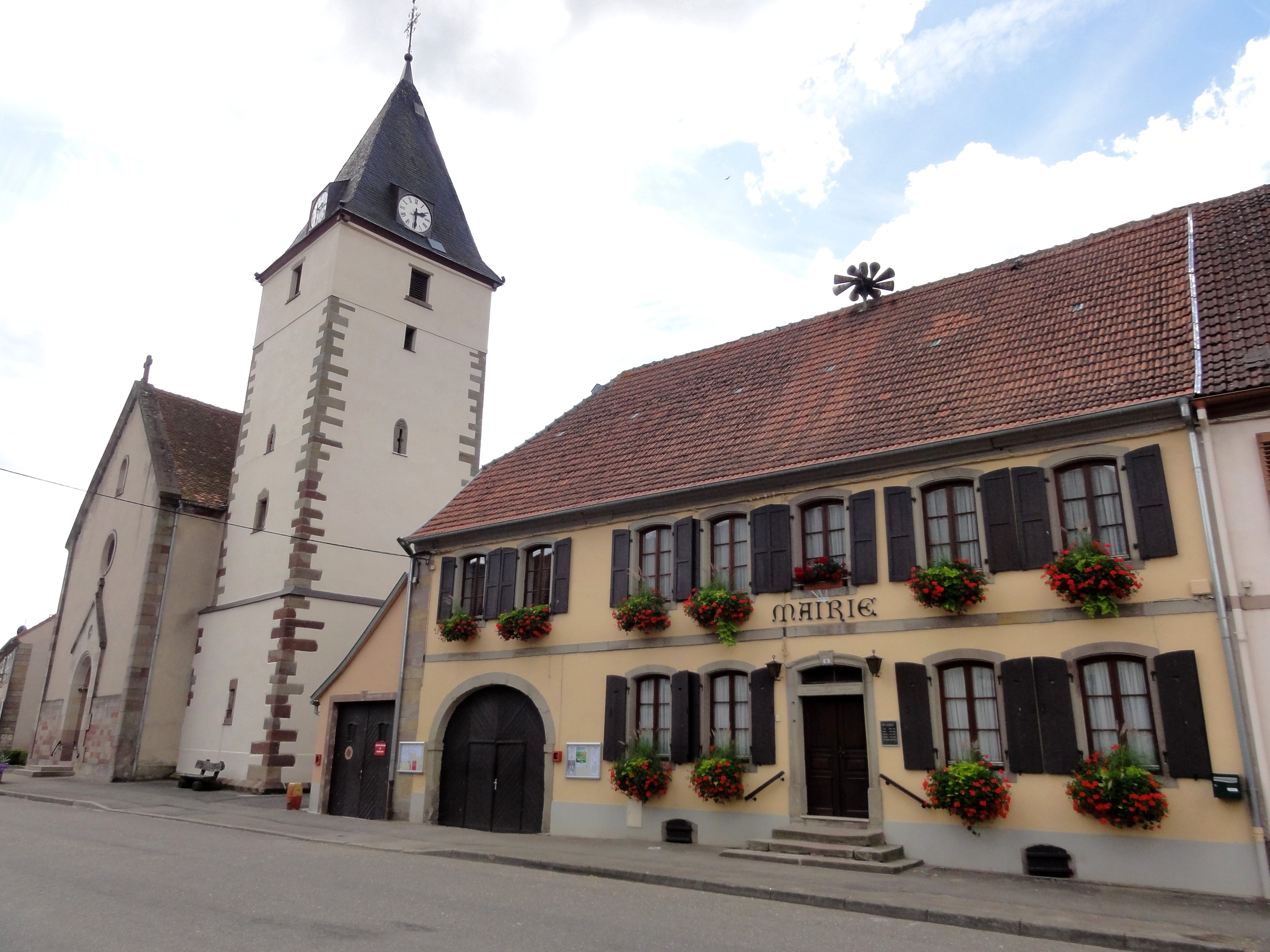
- The Catholic church and Mairie in Harskirchen

- Coat of arms
- Location of Harskirchen
- Location within France Location within Grand Est
- Coordinates: 48°56′01″N 7°02′21″E
- Country: France
- Region: Grand Est
- Department: Bas-Rhin
- Arrondissement: Saverne
- Canton: Ingwiller
- Intercommunality: CC Alsace Bossue

Government
  - Mayor (2022–2026): Benoît Boyon
- Area^{1}: 14.42 km^{2} (5.57 sq mi)
- Highest elevation: 277 m (909 ft)
- Lowest elevation: 213 m (699 ft)
- Population (2023): 895
  - Density: 62.1/km^{2} (161/sq mi)
- Time zone: UTC+01:00 (CET)
  - Summer (DST): UTC+02:00 (CEST)
- INSEE/Postal code: 67183 /67260
- ^{1} French Land Register data, which excludes lakes, ponds, glaciers > 1 km^{2} (0.386 sq mi or 247 acres) and river estuaries.

Harskirchen (French pronunciation: [aʁskiʁʃən]) is a commune in the Bas-Rhin department and Grand Est region of north-eastern France.

== Location ==
Harskirchen lies in the valley of the River Saar in the extreme northwest of the cultural and historical region of Alsace. The Canal des houillères de la Sarre, which connects the Canal de la Marne au Rhin in Gondrexange to the canalized Sarre in Sarreguemines, passes through the commune, west of the village centre.

== Churches ==
Like many communities in French Alsace and the German upper Rhineland, Harskirchen has both a Lutheran and a Catholic church. The Lutheran church dates from the eighteenth century and is decorated in the Baroque style, while the nineteenth-century Catholic church is distinguished by its neo-Gothic tower.

== Population ==
Historical population
Year	Pop.	±% p.a.
1968	742	—
1975	811	+1.28%
1982	821	+0.18%
1990	871	+0.74%
1999	847	−0.31%
2007	877	+0.44%
2012	838	−0.91%
2017	860	+0.52%
2023	895	+0.67%
Source: INSEE

== See also ==
- Communes of the Bas-Rhin department
