= Pagny =

Pagny may refer to:

== Places ==
- Pagny-la-Blanche-Côte, commune in the Meuse department in Lorraine in north-eastern France
- Pagny-la-Ville, commune in the Côte-d'Or department in eastern France
- Pagny-le-Château, commune of the Côte-d'Or department, eastern France
- Pagny-lès-Goin, commune in the Moselle department in Lorraine in north-eastern France
- Pagny-sur-Moselle, commune in the Meurthe-et-Moselle department in north-eastern France
- Pagny-sur-Meuse, commune in the Meuse department in Lorraine in north-eastern France

== People ==
- Florent Pagny (born 1961), French musician
