= Meuse-Line =

The Meuse-Line is the chain of French forts and other military installations closing the passages of the Meuse between Verdun and Toul. These lines formed part of the defensive scheme adopted by France in 1873–1875.

The total length of the line was 31 m, and the forts d'arrêt are disposed along the right bank. The forts are: between Verdun and Saint-Mihiel, Génicourt-sur-Meuse and Troyon; near Saint-Mihiel, Les Paroches (left bank) and Camp des Remains; and near Commercy, Liouville-Saint-Agnant, Gironville-sous-les-Côtes and Jouy-sous-les-Côtes.

Above the circle of the Toul defences there are barrier forts on the Upper Meuse at Pagny (la-Blanche-Cote) and near Neufchâteau; but these last are practically in second line, and between Toul and Épinal the frontier districts are designedly left open.

At Épinal the Moselle-Line begins.
