= Villeroy =

Villeroy may refer to:

== Places ==
- Villeroy, Quebec, a municipality in the province of Québec
- Villeroy, Seine-et-Marne, a commune in the French region of Île-de-France
- Villeroy, Somme, a commune in the French region of Picardie
- Villeroy, Yonne, a commune in the French region of Bourgogne
- Villeroy-sur-Méholle, a commune in the French region of Lorraine

== People ==
- Nicolas de Neufville, seigneur de Villeroy (1543-1617), a secretary of state under Henry III of France and Henry IV of France
- Nicolas de Neufville de Villeroy (1598-1685), a French nobleman and governor of Louis XIV
- François de Neufville, duc de Villeroi (1644-1730), a French military leader

== Historic buildings ==
- Hôtel de Villeroy, home of the Villeroy family from 1370 to 1671, still existing and located in Paris near the Louvre.

== Other ==
- Villeroy & Boch, a manufacturer of ceramics
