= Burey-en-Vaux =

- Commune
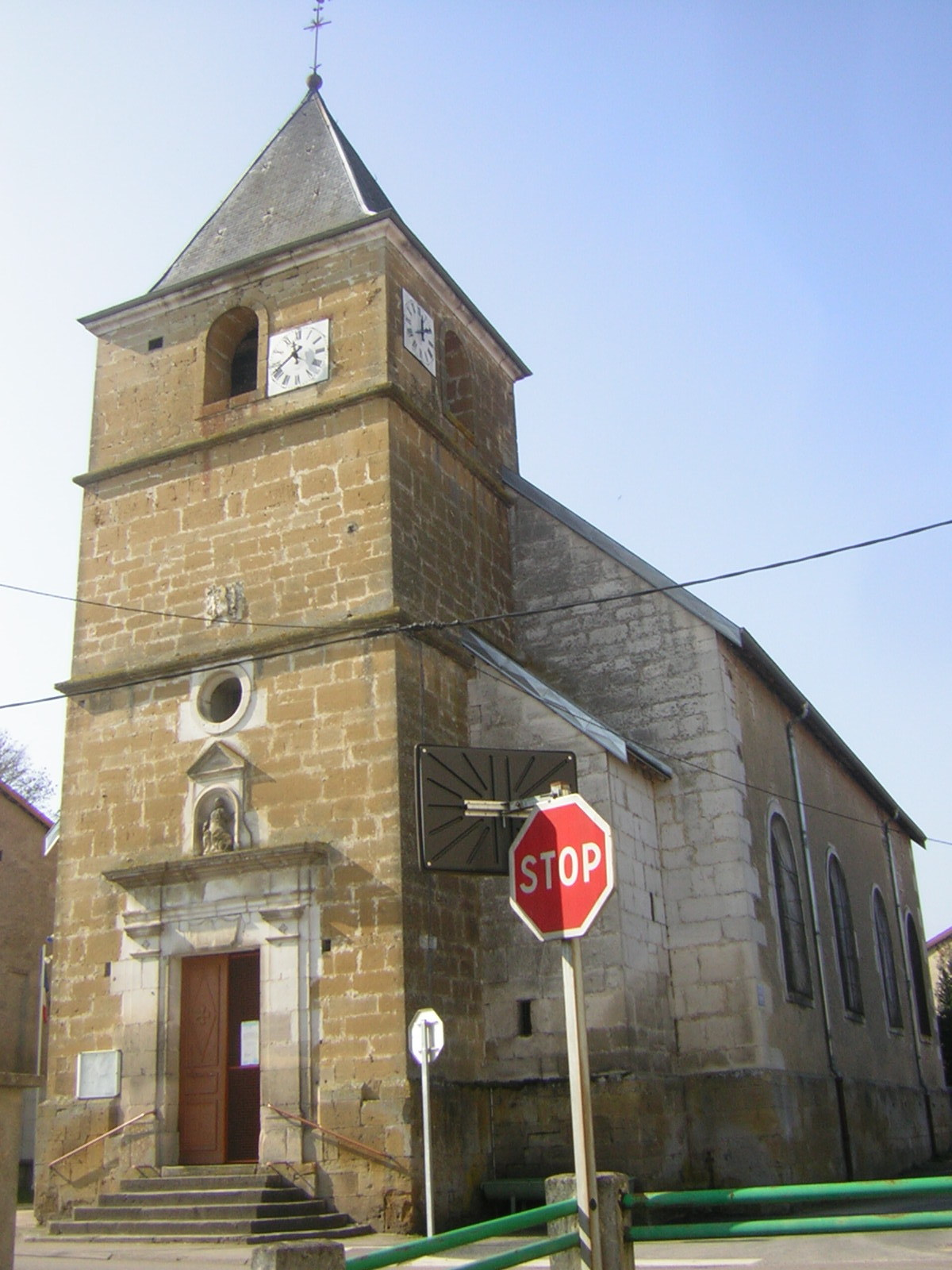
- The church in Burey-en-Vaux

- Coat of arms
- Location of Burey-en-Vaux
- Location within France Location within Grand Est
- Coordinates: 48°33′50″N 5°40′12″E
- Country: France
- Region: Grand Est
- Department: Meuse
- Arrondissement: Commercy
- Canton: Vaucouleurs

Government
  - Mayor (2020–2026): Dominique Caumirey
- Area^{1}: 6.47 km^{2} (2.50 sq mi)
- Elevation: 254 m (833 ft)
- Highest elevation: 396 m (1,299 ft)
- Lowest elevation: 251 m (823 ft)
- Population (2023): 153
  - Density: 23.6/km^{2} (61.2/sq mi)
- Time zone: UTC+01:00 (CET)
  - Summer (DST): UTC+02:00 (CEST)
- INSEE/Postal code: 55088 /55140
- ^{1} French Land Register data, which excludes lakes, ponds, glaciers > 1 km^{2} (0.386 sq mi or 247 acres) and river estuaries.

Burey-en-Vaux (French pronunciation: [byʁɛ ɑ̃ vo]) is a commune in the Meuse department in Grand Est in northeastern France.

== Population ==
Historical population
Year	Pop.	±% p.a.
1968	164	—
1975	131	−3.16%
1982	135	+0.43%
1990	133	−0.19%
1999	114	−1.70%
2007	131	+1.75%
2012	145	+2.05%
2017	154	+1.21%
2023	153	−0.11%
Source: INSEE

== See also ==
- Communes of the Meuse department
