= Nançois-le-Grand =

- Commune
- Coat of arms
- Location of Nançois-le-Grand
- Location within France Location within Grand Est
- Coordinates: 48°43′02″N 5°22′57″E
- Country: France
- Region: Grand Est
- Department: Meuse
- Arrondissement: Commercy
- Canton: Vaucouleurs

Government
  - Mayor (2020–2026): Robert Schmitt
- Area^{1}: 9.25 km^{2} (3.57 sq mi)
- Elevation: 241 m (791 ft)
- Highest elevation: 387 m (1,270 ft)
- Lowest elevation: 255 m (837 ft)
- Population (2023): 70
  - Density: 7.6/km^{2} (20/sq mi)
- Time zone: UTC+01:00 (CET)
  - Summer (DST): UTC+02:00 (CEST)
- INSEE/Postal code: 55371 /55500
- ^{1} French Land Register data, which excludes lakes, ponds, glaciers > 1 km^{2} (0.386 sq mi or 247 acres) and river estuaries.

Nançois-le-Grand (French pronunciation: [nɑ̃swa lə ɡʁɑ̃]) is a commune in the Meuse department in Grand Est in north-eastern France.

== See also ==
- Communes of the Meuse department
