= Méligny-le-Petit =

- Commune
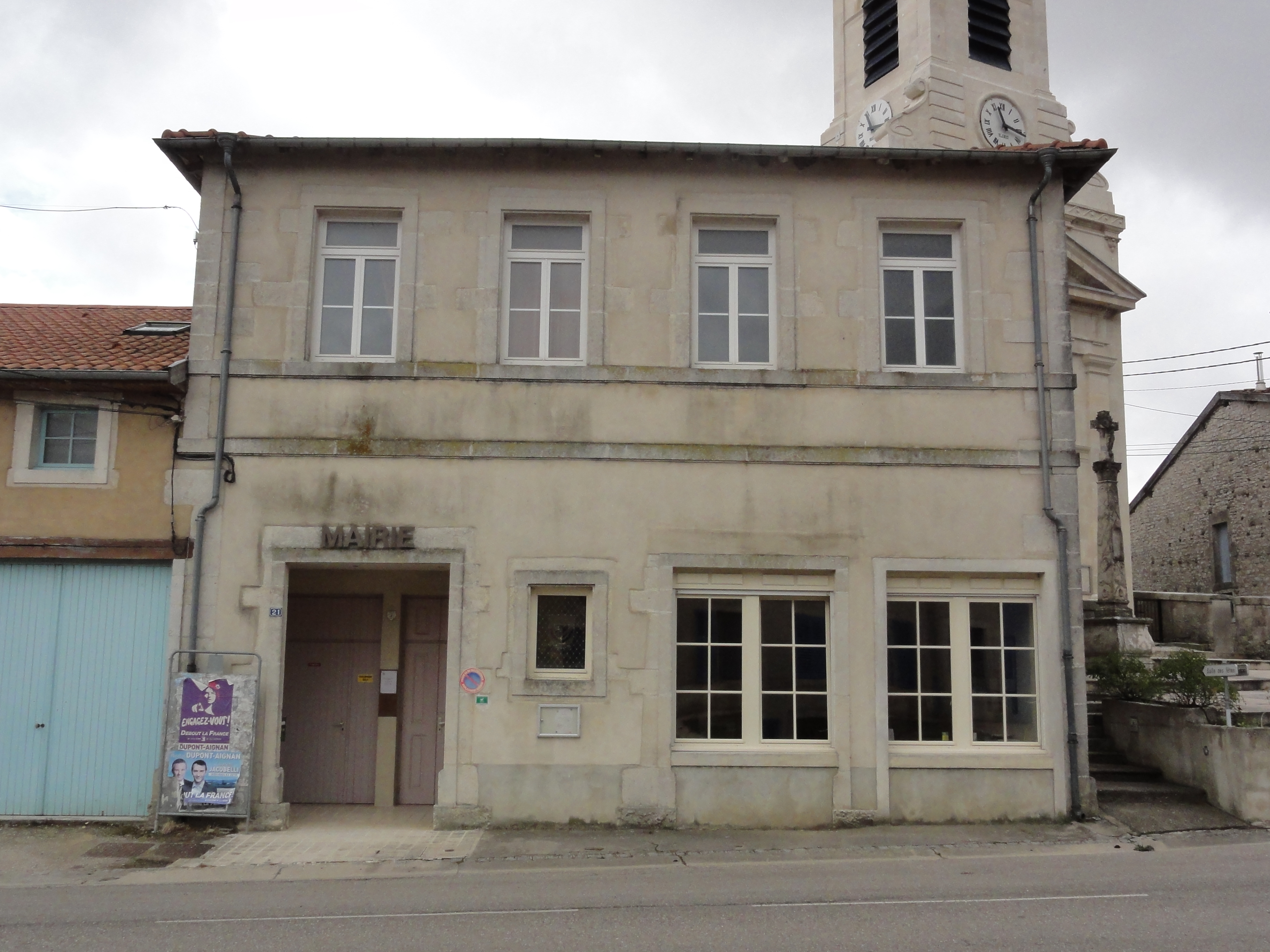
- The town hall in Méligny-le-Petit

- Coat of arms
- Location of Méligny-le-Petit
- Location within France Location within Grand Est
- Coordinates: 48°39′37″N 5°27′59″E
- Country: France
- Region: Grand Est
- Department: Meuse
- Arrondissement: Commercy
- Canton: Vaucouleurs

Government
  - Mayor (2021–2026): Didier Duval
- Area^{1}: 8.39 km^{2} (3.24 sq mi)
- Elevation: 296 m (971 ft)
- Highest elevation: 397 m (1,302 ft)
- Lowest elevation: 276 m (906 ft)
- Population (2023): 73
  - Density: 8.7/km^{2} (23/sq mi)
- Time zone: UTC+01:00 (CET)
  - Summer (DST): UTC+02:00 (CEST)
- INSEE/Postal code: 55331 /55190
- ^{1} French Land Register data, which excludes lakes, ponds, glaciers > 1 km^{2} (0.386 sq mi or 247 acres) and river estuaries.

Méligny-le-Petit (French pronunciation: [meliɲi lə pəti]) is a commune in the Meuse department in Grand Est in north-eastern France.

== See also ==
- Communes of the Meuse department
