= Sepvigny =

- Commune
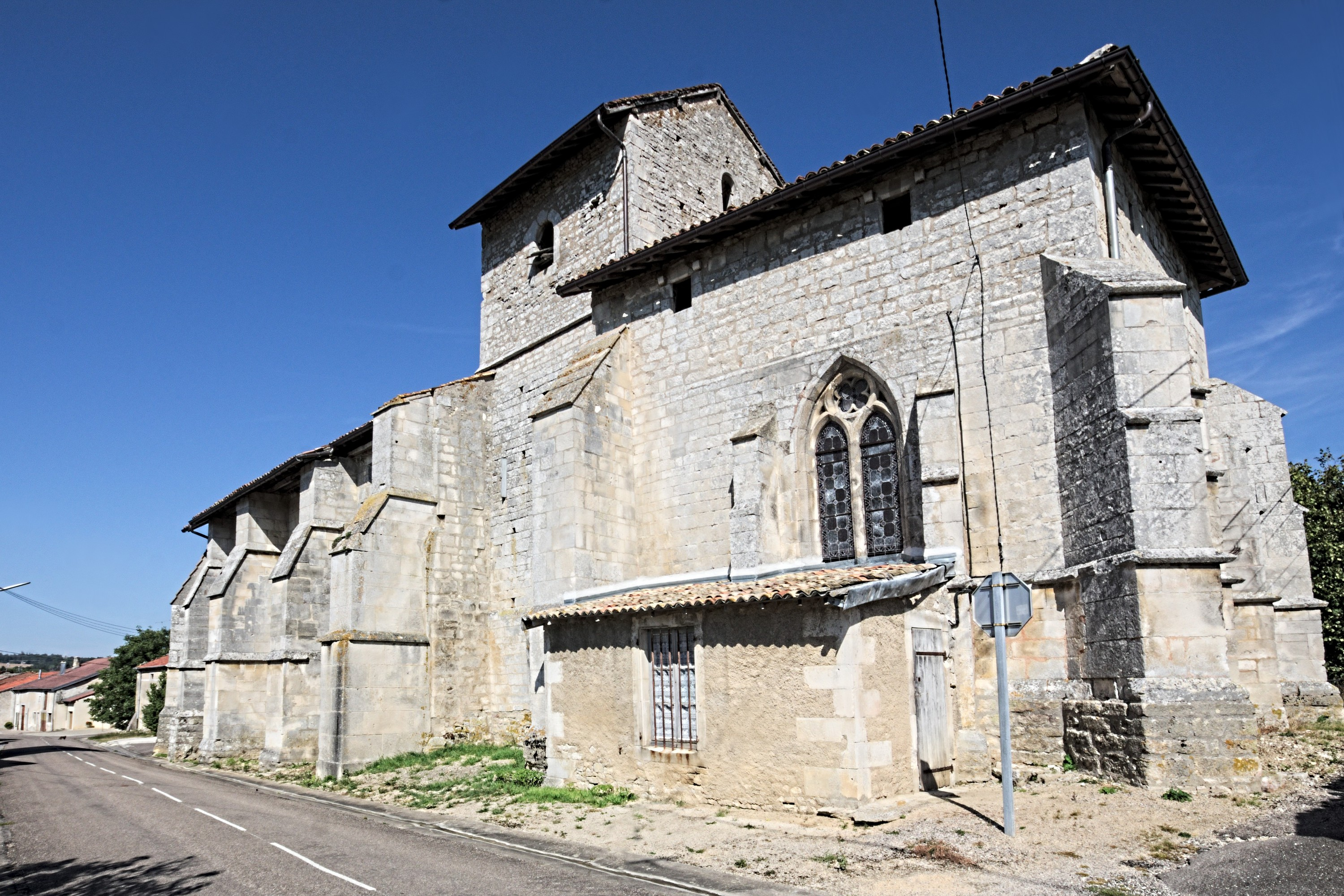
- The church in Sepvigny

- Coat of arms
- Location of Sepvigny
- Location within France Location within Grand Est
- Coordinates: 48°33′29″N 5°41′05″E
- Country: France
- Region: Grand Est
- Department: Meuse
- Arrondissement: Commercy
- Canton: Vaucouleurs

Government
  - Mayor (2020–2026): Eric Marchand
- Area^{1}: 6.4 km^{2} (2.5 sq mi)
- Elevation: 255 m (837 ft)
- Population (2023): 80
  - Density: 13/km^{2} (32/sq mi)
- Time zone: UTC+01:00 (CET)
  - Summer (DST): UTC+02:00 (CEST)
- INSEE/Postal code: 55485 /55140
- ^{1} French Land Register data, which excludes lakes, ponds, glaciers > 1 km^{2} (0.386 sq mi or 247 acres) and river estuaries.

Sepvigny is a commune in the Meuse department in Grand Est in north-eastern France.

== See also ==
- Communes of the Meuse department
