= Erneville-aux-Bois =

- Commune
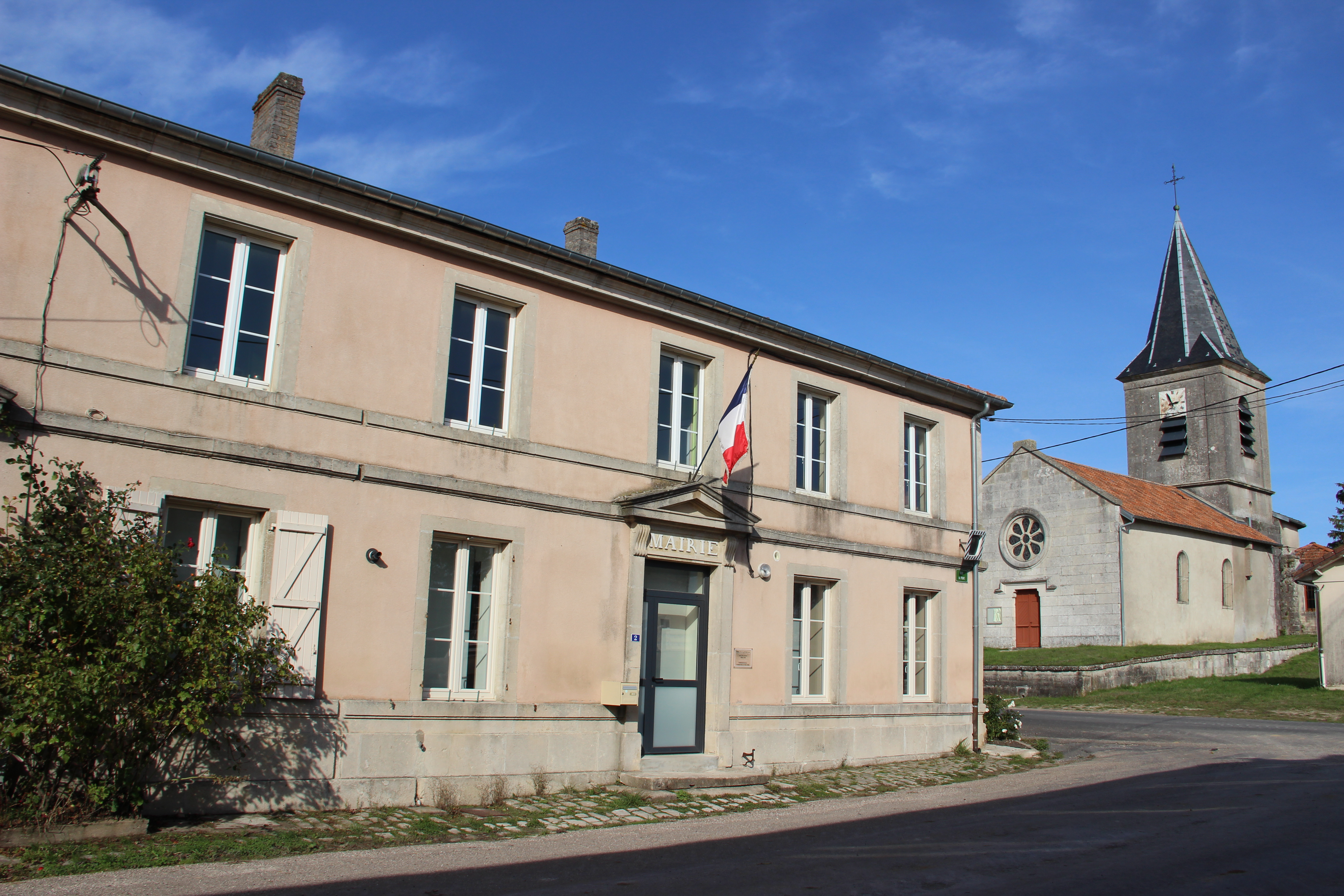
- Town hall

- Coat of arms
- Location of Erneville-aux-Bois
- Location within France Location within Grand Est
- Coordinates: 48°44′36″N 5°24′52″E
- Country: France
- Region: Grand Est
- Department: Meuse
- Arrondissement: Commercy
- Canton: Vaucouleurs

Government
  - Mayor (2020–2026): Catherine Fournier
- Area^{1}: 28.05 km^{2} (10.83 sq mi)
- Elevation: 309 m (1,014 ft)
- Highest elevation: 383 m (1,257 ft)
- Lowest elevation: 269 m (883 ft)
- Population (2023): 152
  - Density: 5.42/km^{2} (14.0/sq mi)
- Time zone: UTC+01:00 (CET)
  - Summer (DST): UTC+02:00 (CEST)
- INSEE/Postal code: 55179 /55500
- ^{1} French Land Register data, which excludes lakes, ponds, glaciers > 1 km^{2} (0.386 sq mi or 247 acres) and river estuaries.

Erneville-aux-Bois (French pronunciation: [ɛʁnəvil o bwa]) is a commune in the Meuse department in Grand Est in north-eastern France. It was created in 1973 by the merger of three former communes: Domrémy-aux-Bois, Ernecourt and Loxeville.

== Climate ==
On average, Erneville-aux-Bois experiences 82.2 days per year with a minimum temperature below 0 °C (32.0 °F), 5.4 days per year with a minimum temperature below −10 °C (14.0 °F), 14.8 days per year with a maximum temperature below 0 °C (32.0 °F), and 6.9 days per year with a maximum temperature above 30 °C (86.0 °F). The record high temperature was 39.4 °C (102.9 °F) on July 25, 2019, while the record low temperature was −24.2 °C (−11.6 °F) on February 18, 1956.

Climate data for Erneville-aux-Bois (1981–2010 normals, extremes 1934–2022)
Month	Jan	Feb	Mar	Apr	May	Jun	Jul	Aug	Sep	Oct	Nov	Dec	Year
Record high °C (°F)	16.0 (60.8)	21.7 (71.1)	25.0 (77.0)	27.9 (82.2)	32.2 (90.0)	36.5 (97.7)	39.4 (102.9)	39.0 (102.2)	33.3 (91.9)	27.0 (80.6)	22.5 (72.5)	17.6 (63.7)	39.4 (102.9)
Mean daily maximum °C (°F)	4.3 (39.7)	5.9 (42.6)	10.0 (50.0)	13.8 (56.8)	18.2 (64.8)	21.3 (70.3)	24.1 (75.4)	23.6 (74.5)	19.3 (66.7)	14.5 (58.1)	8.4 (47.1)	4.9 (40.8)	14.0 (57.2)
Daily mean °C (°F)	1.5 (34.7)	2.4 (36.3)	5.6 (42.1)	8.4 (47.1)	12.5 (54.5)	15.5 (59.9)	18.0 (64.4)	17.7 (63.9)	14.2 (57.6)	10.5 (50.9)	5.4 (41.7)	2.5 (36.5)	9.5 (49.1)
Mean daily minimum °C (°F)	−1.3 (29.7)	−1.1 (30.0)	1.2 (34.2)	2.9 (37.2)	6.9 (44.4)	9.7 (49.5)	11.9 (53.4)	11.8 (53.2)	9.1 (48.4)	6.4 (43.5)	2.3 (36.1)	0.0 (32.0)	5.0 (41.0)
Record low °C (°F)	−23.3 (−9.9)	−24.2 (−11.6)	−19.0 (−2.2)	−8.7 (16.3)	−5.2 (22.6)	−1.4 (29.5)	1.1 (34.0)	0.7 (33.3)	−3.8 (25.2)	−8.4 (16.9)	−14.6 (5.7)	−20.4 (−4.7)	−24.2 (−11.6)
Average precipitation mm (inches)	109.9 (4.33)	86.3 (3.40)	88.0 (3.46)	68.7 (2.70)	76.6 (3.02)	74.5 (2.93)	79.7 (3.14)	76.0 (2.99)	81.8 (3.22)	101.0 (3.98)	93.4 (3.68)	120.6 (4.75)	1,056.5 (41.6)
Average precipitation days (≥ 1.0 mm)	13.1	11.1	12.8	10.8	11.8	11.0	10.4	9.3	9.8	12.3	13.4	13.1	138.9
Source: Meteociel

== See also ==
- Communes of the Meuse department
