= Rigny-la-Salle =

- Commune
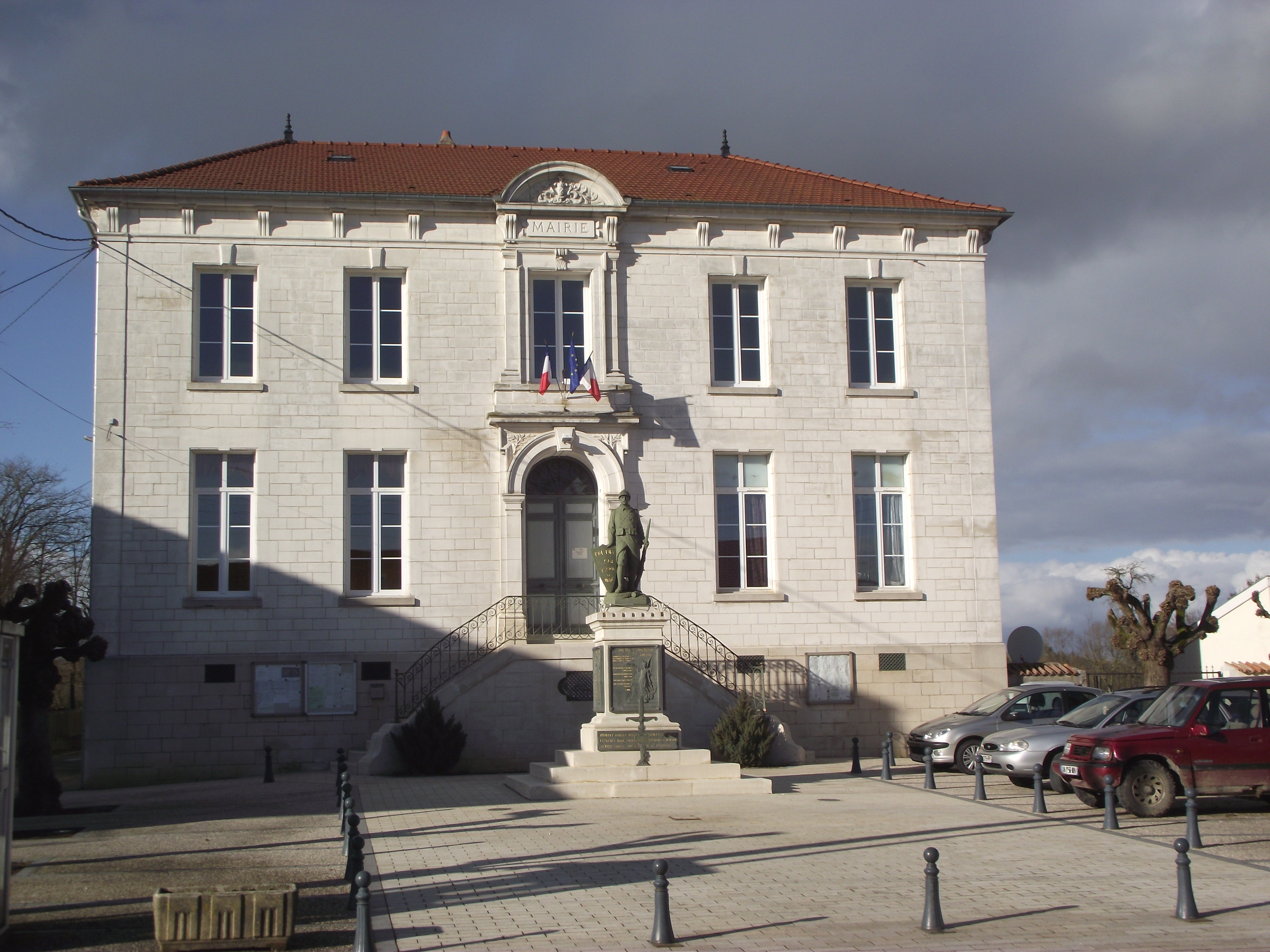
- The town hall in Rigny-la-Salle

- Coat of arms
- Location of Rigny-la-Salle
- Location within France Location within Grand Est
- Coordinates: 48°37′18″N 5°42′05″E
- Country: France
- Region: Grand Est
- Department: Meuse
- Arrondissement: Commercy
- Canton: Vaucouleurs
- Intercommunality: CC Commercy - Void - Vaucouleurs

Government
  - Mayor (2020–2026): Séverine Louis
- Area^{1}: 10.28 km^{2} (3.97 sq mi)
- Elevation: 250 m (820 ft)
- Highest elevation: 392 m (1,286 ft)
- Lowest elevation: 242 m (794 ft)
- Population (2023): 371
  - Density: 36.1/km^{2} (93.5/sq mi)
- Time zone: UTC+01:00 (CET)
  - Summer (DST): UTC+02:00 (CEST)
- INSEE/Postal code: 55433 /55140
- ^{1} French Land Register data, which excludes lakes, ponds, glaciers > 1 km^{2} (0.386 sq mi or 247 acres) and river estuaries.

Rigny-la-Salle (French pronunciation: [ʁiɲi la sal]) is a commune in the Meuse department in Grand Est in north-eastern France.

== See also ==
- Communes of the Meuse department
