= Naives-en-Blois =

- Commune
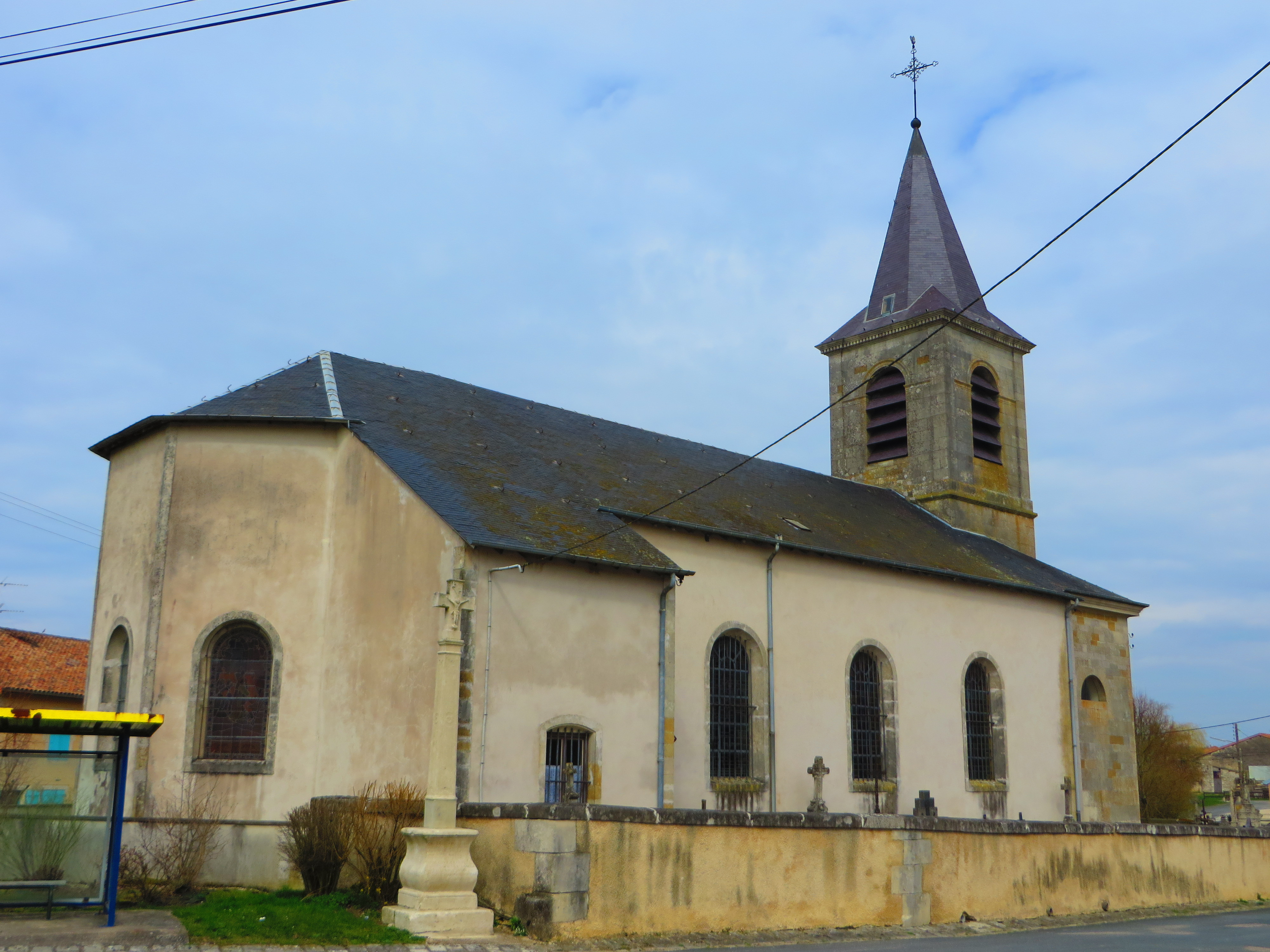
- The church in Naives-en-Blois

- Coat of arms
- Location of Naives-en-Blois
- Location within France Location within Grand Est
- Coordinates: 48°39′44″N 5°32′54″E
- Country: France
- Region: Grand Est
- Department: Meuse
- Arrondissement: Commercy
- Canton: Vaucouleurs

Government
  - Mayor (2020–2026): Daniel Vauthier
- Area^{1}: 15.7 km^{2} (6.1 sq mi)
- Elevation: 300 m (980 ft)
- Highest elevation: 383 m (1,257 ft)
- Lowest elevation: 262 m (860 ft)
- Population (2023): 155
  - Density: 9.87/km^{2} (25.6/sq mi)
- Time zone: UTC+01:00 (CET)
  - Summer (DST): UTC+02:00 (CEST)
- INSEE/Postal code: 55368 /55190
- ^{1} French Land Register data, which excludes lakes, ponds, glaciers > 1 km^{2} (0.386 sq mi or 247 acres) and river estuaries.

Naives-en-Blois (French pronunciation: [nɛv ɑ̃ blwa]) is a commune in the Meuse department in Grand Est in north-eastern France.

== See also ==
- Communes of the Meuse department
