= Montigny-lès-Vaucouleurs =

- Commune
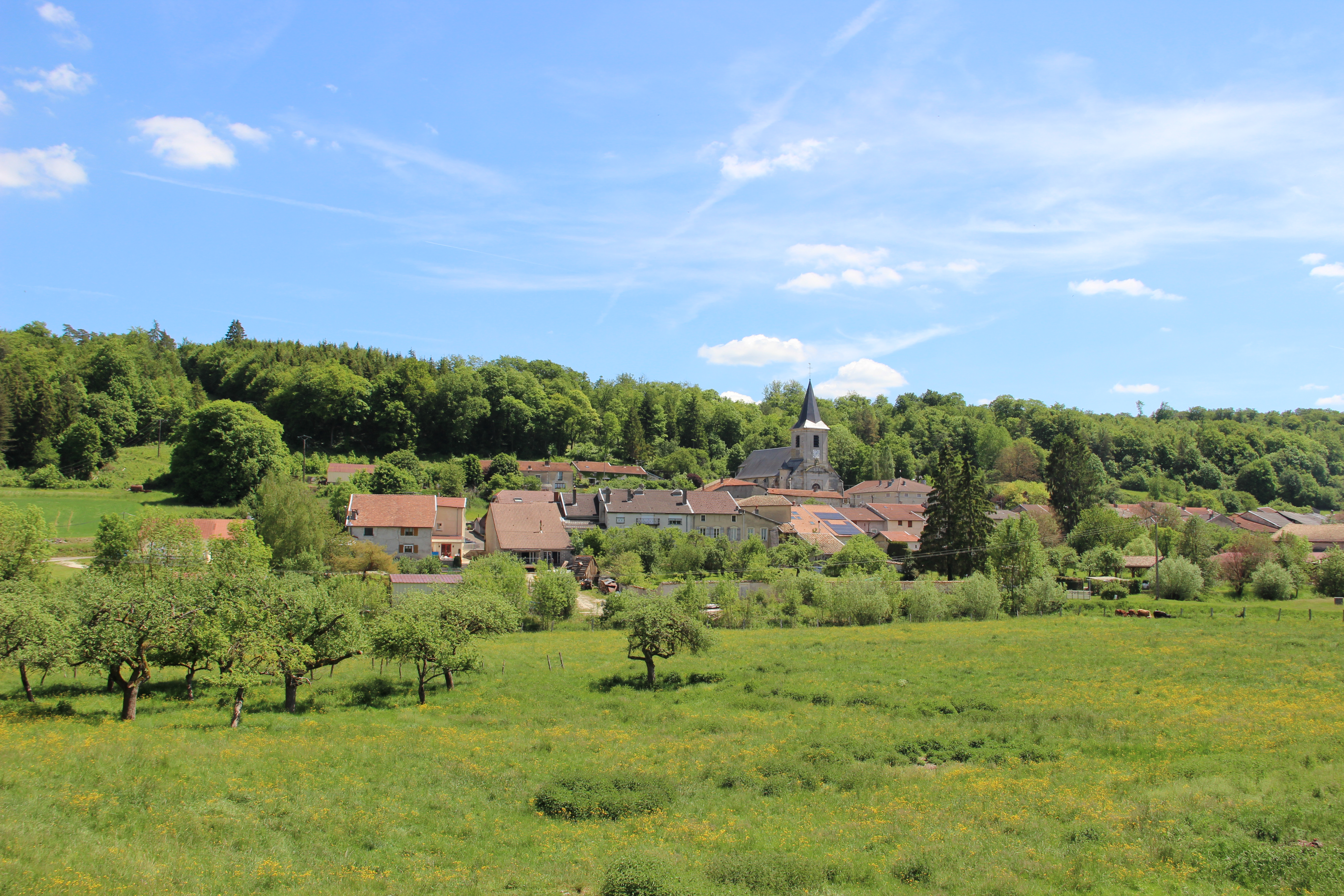
- A general view of Montigny-lès-Vaucouleurs

- Coat of arms
- Location of Montigny-lès-Vaucouleurs
- Location within France Location within Grand Est
- Coordinates: 48°35′18″N 5°37′57″E
- Country: France
- Region: Grand Est
- Department: Meuse
- Arrondissement: Commercy
- Canton: Vaucouleurs
- Intercommunality: CC Commercy - Void - Vaucouleurs

Government
  - Mayor (2020–2026): Sylvie Najotte
- Area^{1}: 11.83 km^{2} (4.57 sq mi)
- Highest elevation: 381 m (1,250 ft)
- Lowest elevation: 280 m (920 ft)
- Population (2023): 74
  - Density: 6.3/km^{2} (16/sq mi)
- Time zone: UTC+01:00 (CET)
  - Summer (DST): UTC+02:00 (CEST)
- INSEE/Postal code: 55350 /55140
- ^{1} French Land Register data, which excludes lakes, ponds, glaciers > 1 km^{2} (0.386 sq mi or 247 acres) and river estuaries.

Montigny-lès-Vaucouleurs (French pronunciation: [mɔ̃tiɲi lɛ vokulœʁ], literally Montigny near Vaucouleurs) is a commune in the Meuse department in Grand Est in north-eastern France.

== See also ==
- Communes of the Meuse department
