= Chalaines =

- Commune
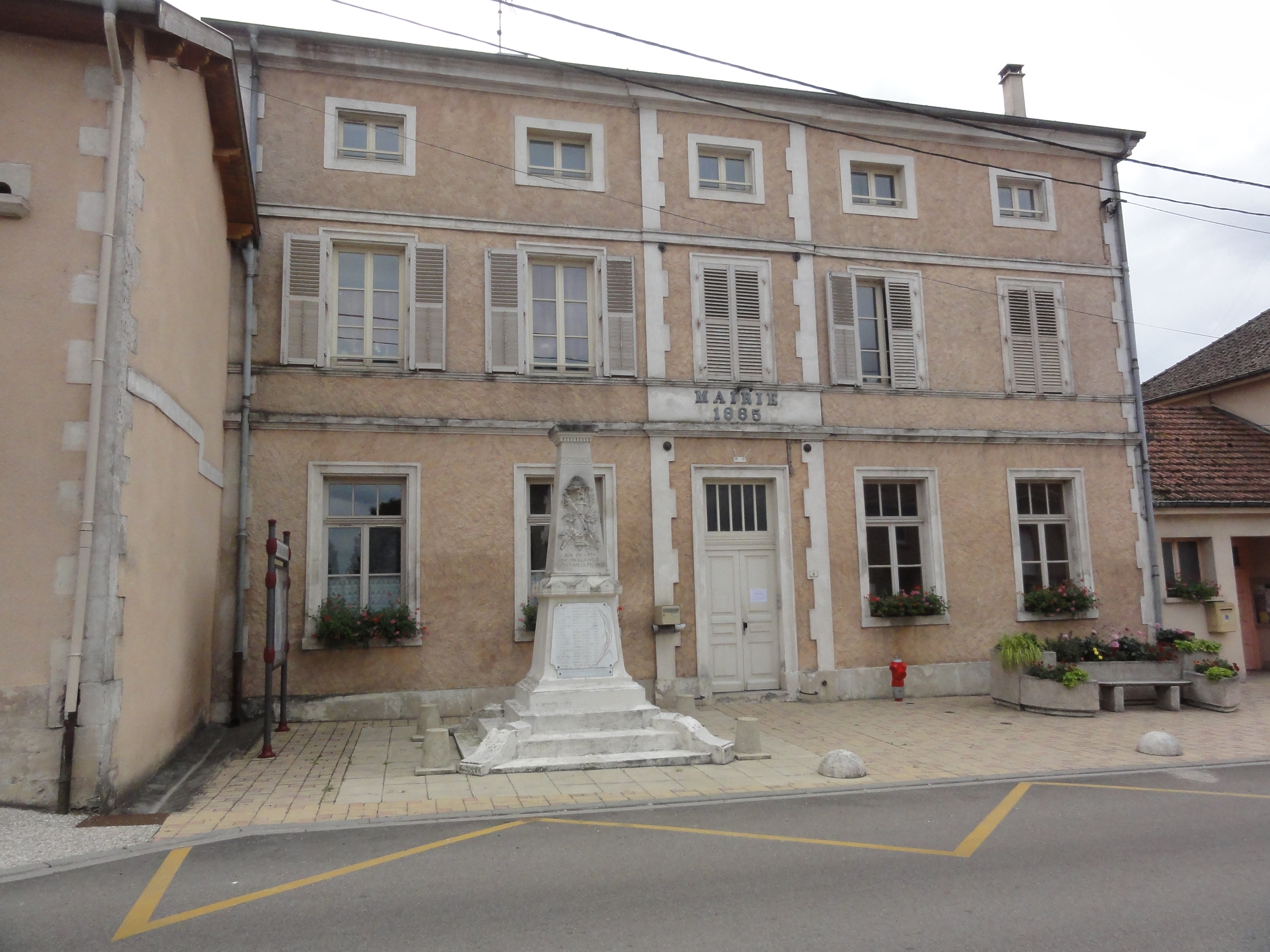
- The town hall in Chalaines

- Coat of arms
- Location of Chalaines
- Location within France Location within Grand Est
- Coordinates: 48°36′14″N 5°40′53″E
- Country: France
- Region: Grand Est
- Department: Meuse
- Arrondissement: Commercy
- Canton: Vaucouleurs

Government
  - Mayor (2020–2026): Brigitte Potier-Kercret
- Area^{1}: 8.1 km^{2} (3.1 sq mi)
- Elevation: 260 m (850 ft)
- Highest elevation: 373 m (1,224 ft)
- Lowest elevation: 245 m (804 ft)
- Population (2023): 299
  - Density: 37/km^{2} (96/sq mi)
- Time zone: UTC+01:00 (CET)
  - Summer (DST): UTC+02:00 (CEST)
- INSEE/Postal code: 55097 /55140
- ^{1} French Land Register data, which excludes lakes, ponds, glaciers > 1 km^{2} (0.386 sq mi or 247 acres) and river estuaries.

Chalaines (French pronunciation: [ʃalɛn]) is a commune in the Meuse department in Grand Est in north-eastern France.

== See also ==
- Communes of the Meuse department
