= Boviolles =

- Commune
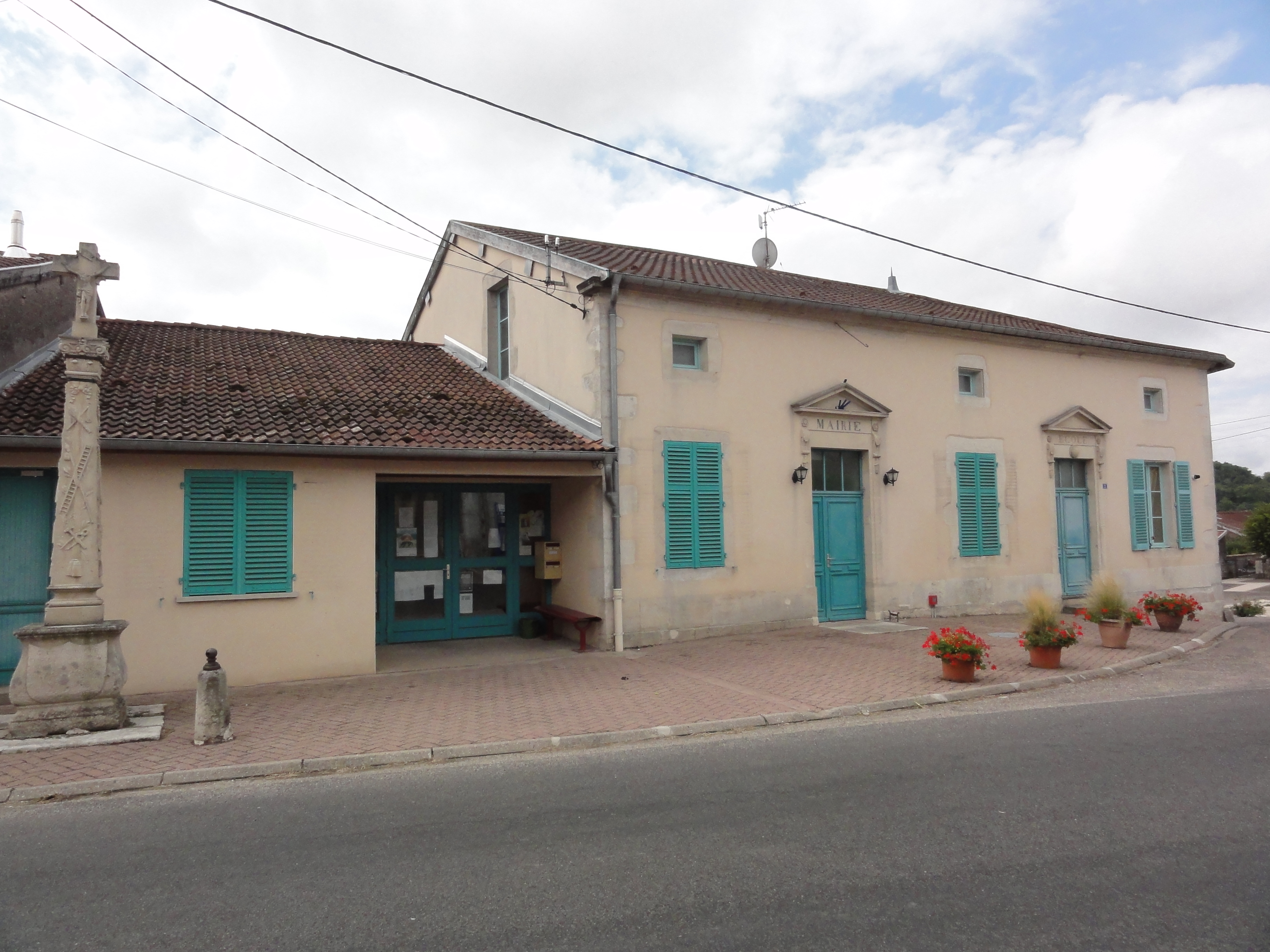
- The town hall in Boviolles

- Coat of arms
- Location of Boviolles
- Location within France Location within Grand Est
- Coordinates: 48°38′53″N 5°25′06″E
- Country: France
- Region: Grand Est
- Department: Meuse
- Arrondissement: Commercy
- Canton: Vaucouleurs

Government
  - Mayor (2020–2026): Jean-Pierre Ligier
- Area^{1}: 8.13 km^{2} (3.14 sq mi)
- Elevation: 280 m (920 ft)
- Highest elevation: 395 m (1,296 ft)
- Lowest elevation: 241 m (791 ft)
- Population (2023): 99
  - Density: 12/km^{2} (32/sq mi)
- Time zone: UTC+01:00 (CET)
  - Summer (DST): UTC+02:00 (CEST)
- INSEE/Postal code: 55067 /55500
- ^{1} French Land Register data, which excludes lakes, ponds, glaciers > 1 km^{2} (0.386 sq mi or 247 acres) and river estuaries.

Boviolles (French pronunciation: [bɔvjɔl]) is a commune in the Meuse department in Grand Est in northeastern France.

== Population ==
Historical population
Year	Pop.	±% p.a.
1968	115	—
1975	96	−2.55%
1982	79	−2.75%
1990	92	+1.92%
1999	91	−0.12%
2007	99	+1.06%
2012	105	+1.18%
2017	97	−1.57%
2023	99	+0.34%
Source: INSEE

== See also ==
- Communes of the Meuse department
