= Rigny-Saint-Martin =

- Commune
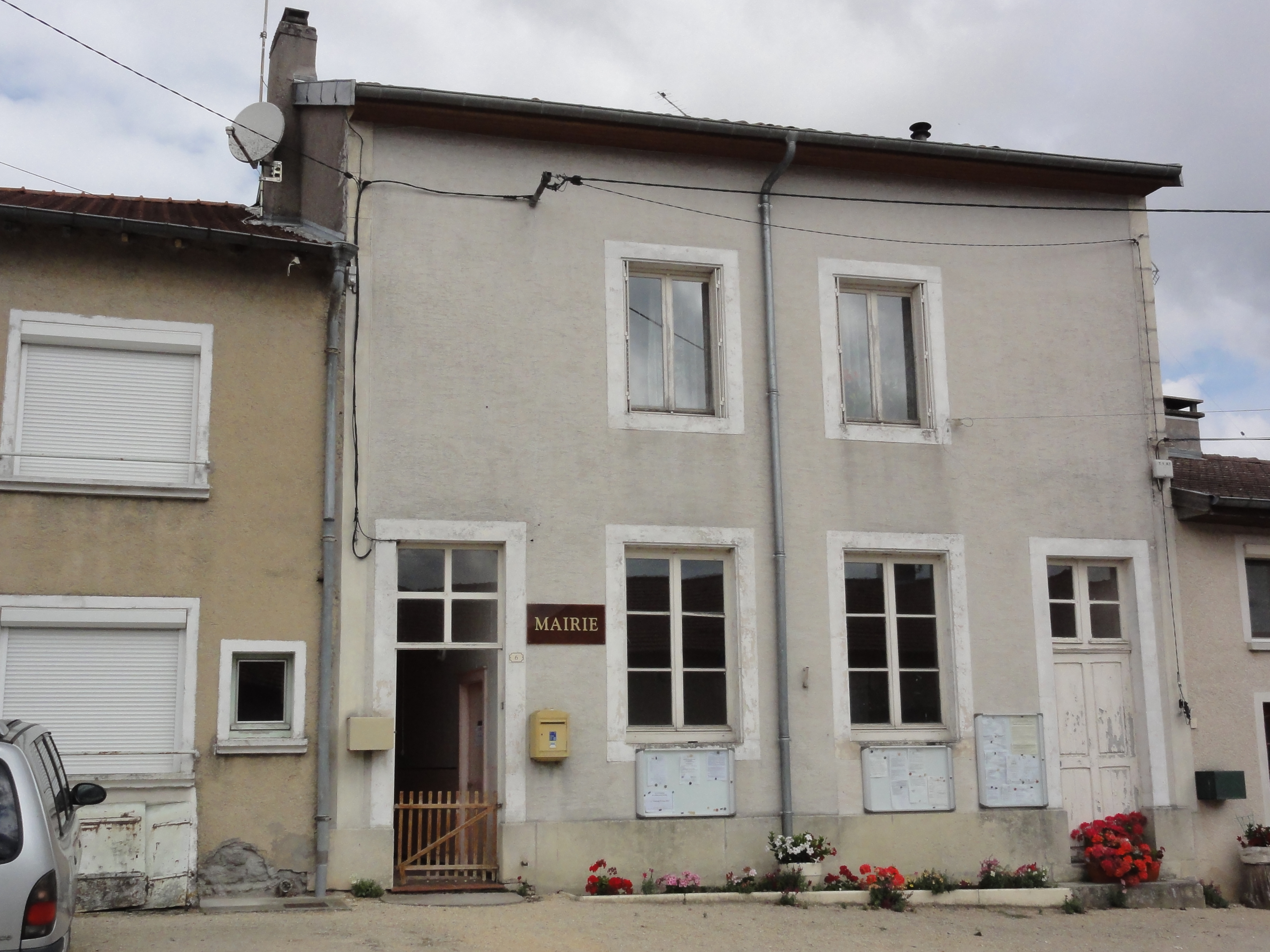
- The town hall in Rigny-Saint-Martin

- Coat of arms
- Location of Rigny-Saint-Martin
- Location within France Location within Grand Est
- Coordinates: 48°36′41″N 5°42′53″E
- Country: France
- Region: Grand Est
- Department: Meuse
- Arrondissement: Commercy
- Canton: Vaucouleurs

Government
  - Mayor (2020–2026): Éliane Poirson
- Area^{1}: 16.11 km^{2} (6.22 sq mi)
- Elevation: 260 m (850 ft)
- Highest elevation: 421 m (1,381 ft)
- Lowest elevation: 247 m (810 ft)
- Population (2023): 50
  - Density: 3.1/km^{2} (8.0/sq mi)
- Time zone: UTC+01:00 (CET)
  - Summer (DST): UTC+02:00 (CEST)
- INSEE/Postal code: 55434 /55140
- ^{1} French Land Register data, which excludes lakes, ponds, glaciers > 1 km^{2} (0.386 sq mi or 247 acres) and river estuaries.

Rigny-Saint-Martin (French pronunciation: [ʁiɲi sɛ̃ maʁtɛ̃]) is a commune in the Meuse department in Grand Est in north-eastern France.

== See also ==
- Communes of the Meuse department
