= Laneuville-au-Rupt =

- Commune
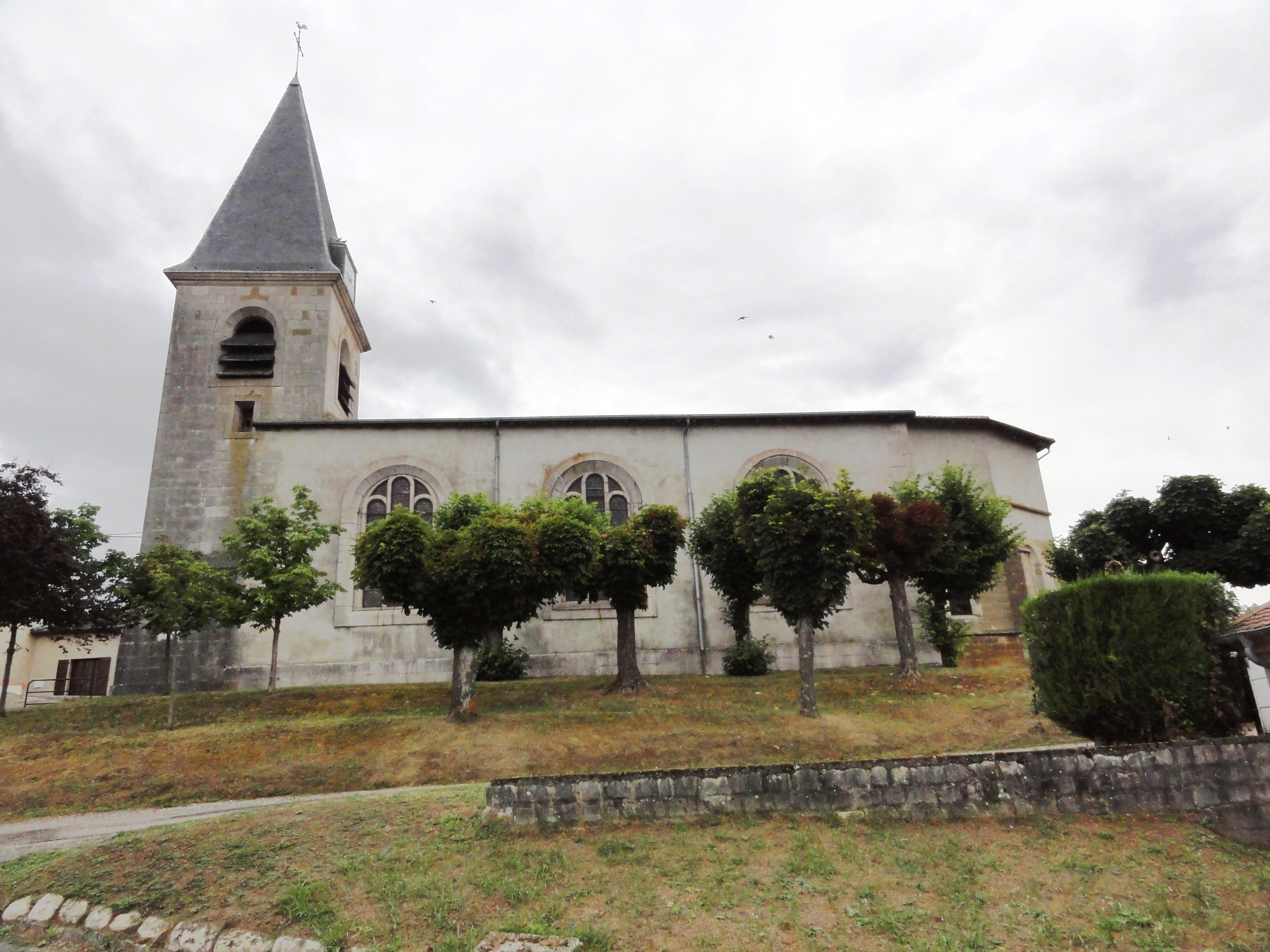
- The church in Laneuville-au-Rupt

- Coat of arms
- Location of Laneuville-au-Rupt
- Location within France Location within Grand Est
- Coordinates: 48°42′19″N 5°35′16″E
- Country: France
- Region: Grand Est
- Department: Meuse
- Arrondissement: Commercy
- Canton: Vaucouleurs

Government
  - Mayor (2020–2026): Jacques Furlan
- Area^{1}: 13.23 km^{2} (5.11 sq mi)
- Elevation: 250 m (820 ft)
- Highest elevation: 362 m (1,188 ft)
- Lowest elevation: 238 m (781 ft)
- Population (2023): 192
  - Density: 14.5/km^{2} (37.6/sq mi)
- Time zone: UTC+01:00 (CET)
  - Summer (DST): UTC+02:00 (CEST)
- INSEE/Postal code: 55278 /55190
- ^{1} French Land Register data, which excludes lakes, ponds, glaciers > 1 km^{2} (0.386 sq mi or 247 acres) and river estuaries.

Laneuville-au-Rupt (French pronunciation: [lanøvil o ʁy]) is a commune in the Meuse department in Grand Est in north-eastern France.

== See also ==
- Communes of the Meuse department
