= Cousances-lès-Triconville =

- Commune
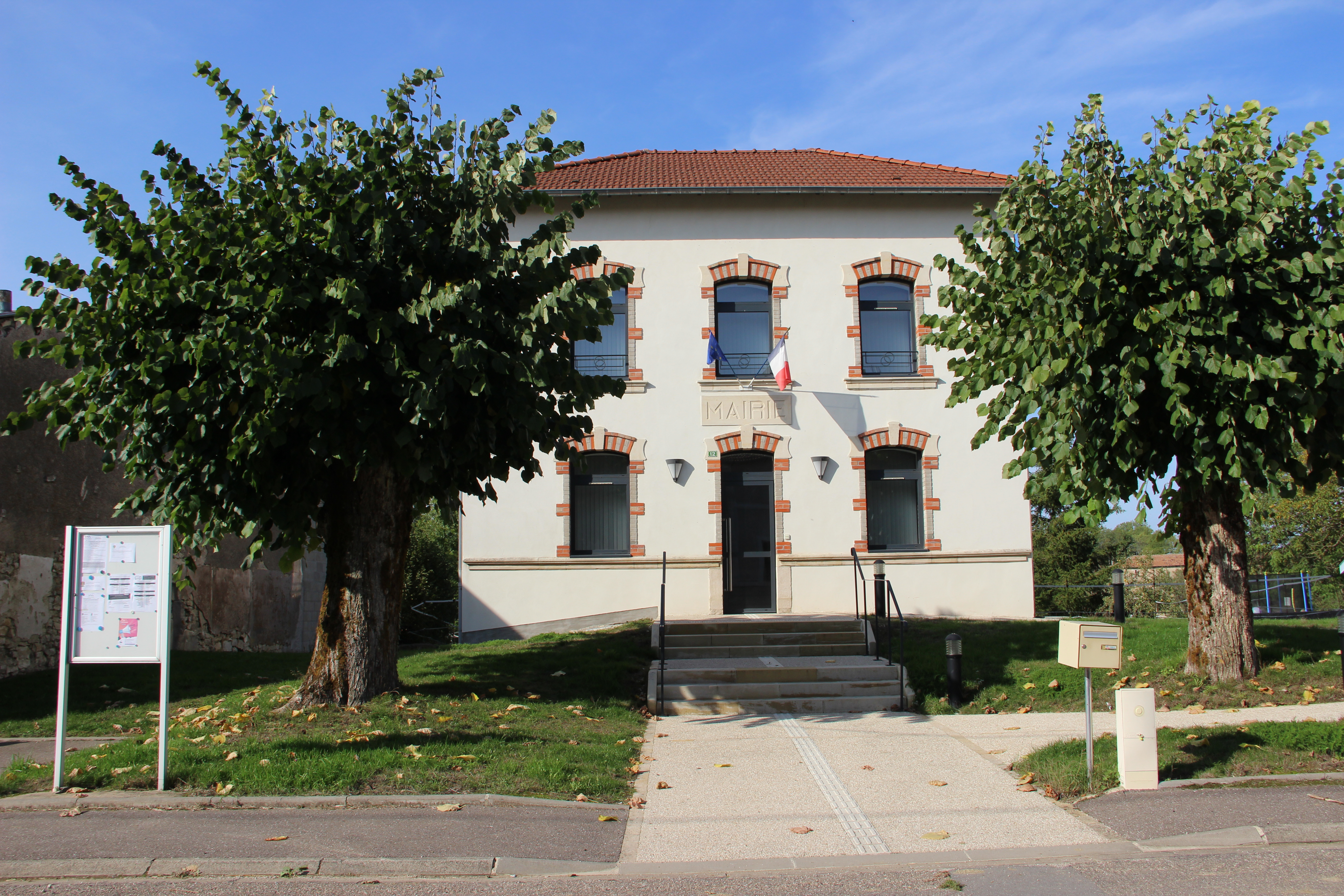
- Town hall

- Coat of arms
- Location of Cousances-lès-Triconville
- Location within France Location within Grand Est
- Coordinates: 48°45′53″N 5°23′11″E
- Country: France
- Region: Grand Est
- Department: Meuse
- Arrondissement: Commercy
- Canton: Vaucouleurs

Government
  - Mayor (2020–2026): Michel Bizard
- Area^{1}: 18.27 km^{2} (7.05 sq mi)
- Elevation: 309 m (1,014 ft)
- Highest elevation: 382 m (1,253 ft)
- Lowest elevation: 263 m (863 ft)
- Population (2023): 146
  - Density: 7.99/km^{2} (20.7/sq mi)
- Time zone: UTC+01:00 (CET)
  - Summer (DST): UTC+02:00 (CEST)
- INSEE/Postal code: 55518 /55500
- ^{1} French Land Register data, which excludes lakes, ponds, glaciers > 1 km^{2} (0.386 sq mi or 247 acres) and river estuaries.

Cousances-lès-Triconville (French pronunciation: [kuzɑ̃s lɛ tʁikɔ̃vil]) is a commune in the Meuse department in Grand Est in north-eastern France. It was created in 1973 by the merger of two former communes: Cousances-aux-Bois and Triconville.

== See also ==
- Communes of the Meuse department
