= Maxey-sur-Vaise =

- Commune
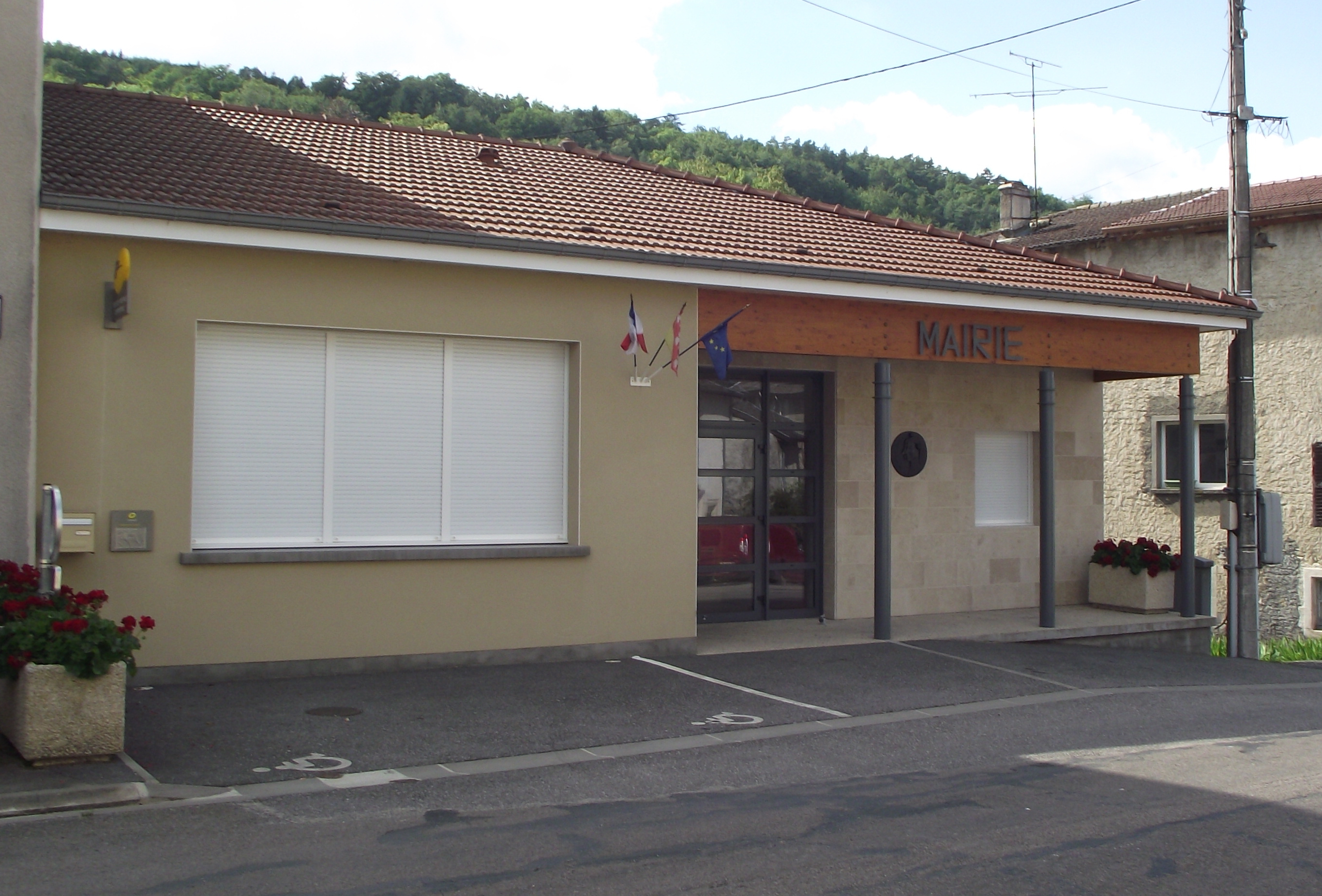
- The town hall in Maxey-sur-Vaise

- Coat of arms
- Location of Maxey-sur-Vaise
- Location within France Location within Grand Est
- Coordinates: 48°32′21″N 5°40′02″E
- Country: France
- Region: Grand Est
- Department: Meuse
- Arrondissement: Commercy
- Canton: Vaucouleurs
- Intercommunality: CC Commercy - Void - Vaucouleurs

Government
  - Mayor (2020–2026): Julien Cardot
- Area^{1}: 10.9 km^{2} (4.2 sq mi)
- Elevation: 260 m (850 ft)
- Highest elevation: 409 m (1,342 ft)
- Lowest elevation: 252 m (827 ft)
- Population (2023): 279
  - Density: 25.6/km^{2} (66.3/sq mi)
- Time zone: UTC+01:00 (CET)
  - Summer (DST): UTC+02:00 (CEST)
- INSEE/Postal code: 55328 /55140
- ^{1} French Land Register data, which excludes lakes, ponds, glaciers > 1 km^{2} (0.386 sq mi or 247 acres) and river estuaries.

Maxey-sur-Vaise is a commune in the Meuse department in Grand Est in north-eastern France.

== See also ==
- Communes of the Meuse department
