= Marson-sur-Barboure =

- Commune
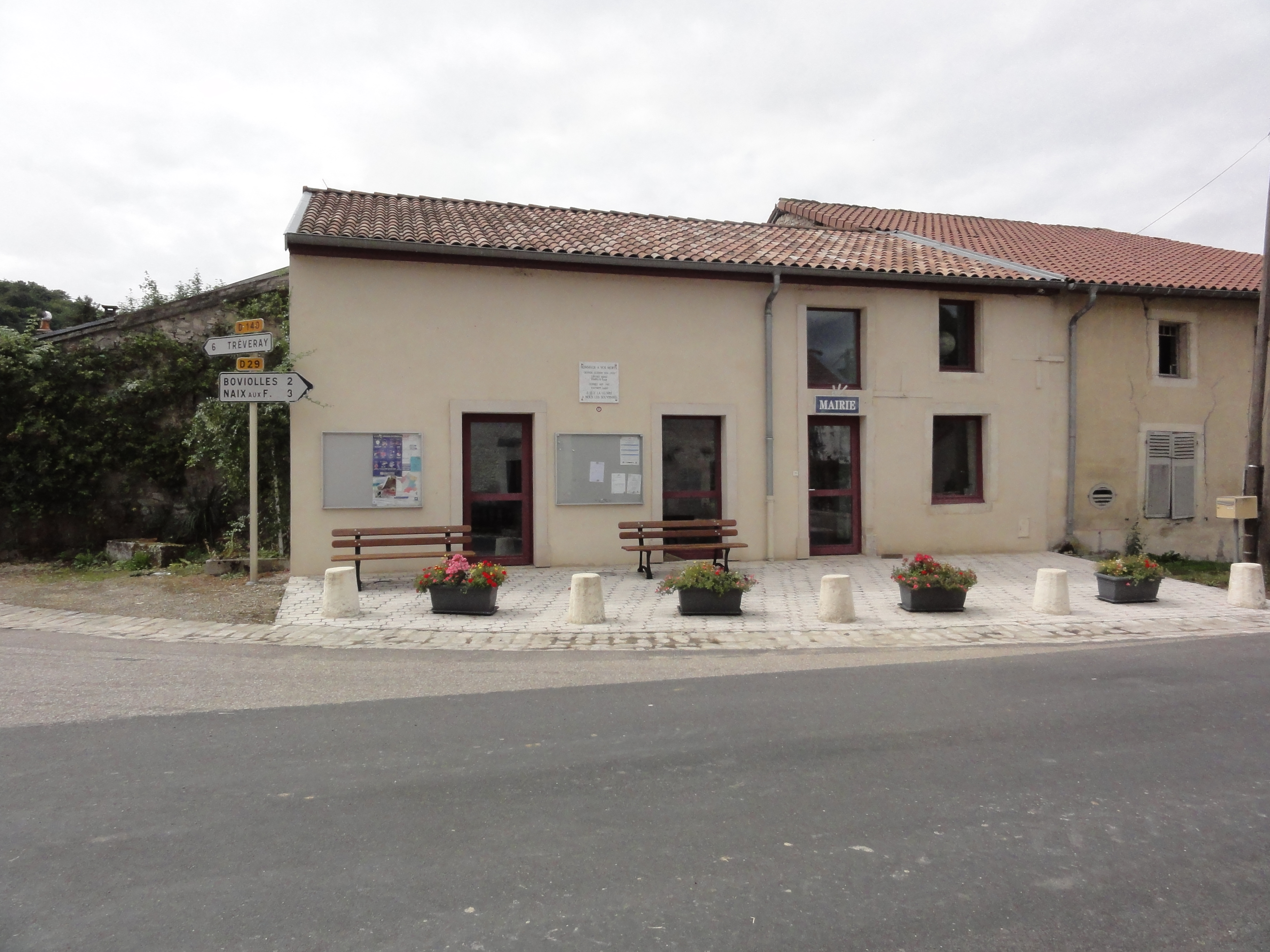
- The town hall in Marson-sur-Barboure

- Coat of arms
- Location of Marson-sur-Barboure
- Location within France Location within Grand Est
- Coordinates: 48°38′31″N 5°26′43″E
- Country: France
- Region: Grand Est
- Department: Meuse
- Arrondissement: Commercy
- Canton: Vaucouleurs

Government
  - Mayor (2020–2026): Joël Petitjean
- Area^{1}: 5.9 km^{2} (2.3 sq mi)
- Elevation: 286 m (938 ft)
- Highest elevation: 398 m (1,306 ft)
- Lowest elevation: 264 m (866 ft)
- Population (2023): 59
  - Density: 10/km^{2} (26/sq mi)
- Time zone: UTC+01:00 (CET)
  - Summer (DST): UTC+02:00 (CEST)
- INSEE/Postal code: 55322 /55190
- ^{1} French Land Register data, which excludes lakes, ponds, glaciers > 1 km^{2} (0.386 sq mi or 247 acres) and river estuaries.

Marson-sur-Barboure is a commune in the Meuse department in Grand Est in north-eastern France.

== See also ==
- Communes of the Meuse department
