= Sauvoy =

- Commune
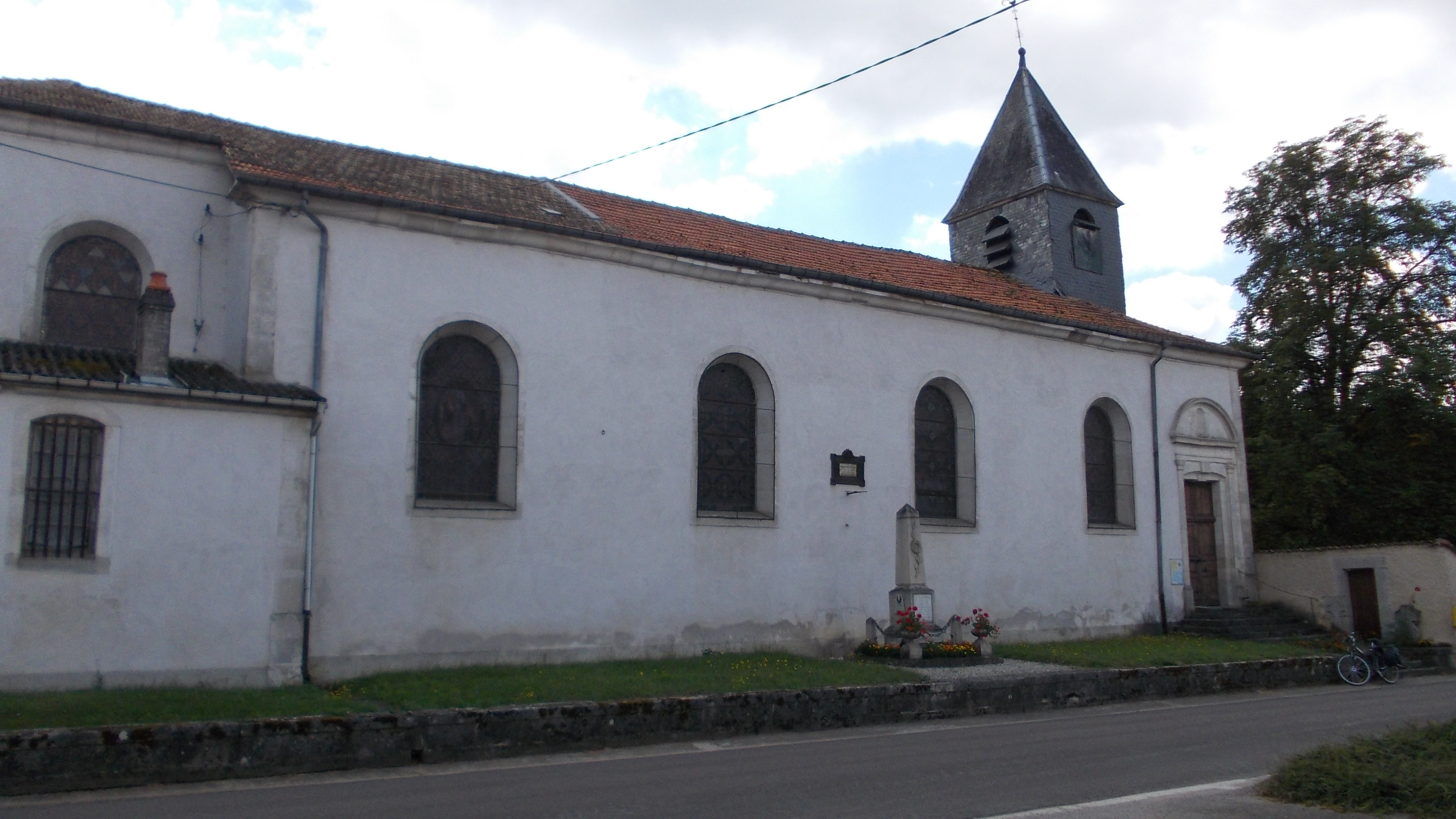
- The church in Sauvoy

- Coat of arms
- Location of Sauvoy
- Location within France Location within Grand Est
- Coordinates: 48°38′17″N 5°36′16″E
- Country: France
- Region: Grand Est
- Department: Meuse
- Arrondissement: Commercy
- Canton: Vaucouleurs

Government
  - Mayor (2020–2026): Michelle Thiriet
- Area^{1}: 7.82 km^{2} (3.02 sq mi)
- Elevation: 275 m (902 ft)
- Highest elevation: 363 m (1,191 ft)
- Lowest elevation: 252 m (827 ft)
- Population (2023): 71
  - Density: 9.1/km^{2} (24/sq mi)
- Time zone: UTC+01:00 (CET)
  - Summer (DST): UTC+02:00 (CEST)
- INSEE/Postal code: 55475 /55190
- ^{1} French Land Register data, which excludes lakes, ponds, glaciers > 1 km^{2} (0.386 sq mi or 247 acres) and river estuaries.

Sauvoy (French pronunciation: [sovwa]) is a commune in the Meuse department in Grand Est in north-eastern France.

== See also ==
- Communes of the Meuse department
