= Broussey-en-Blois =

- Commune
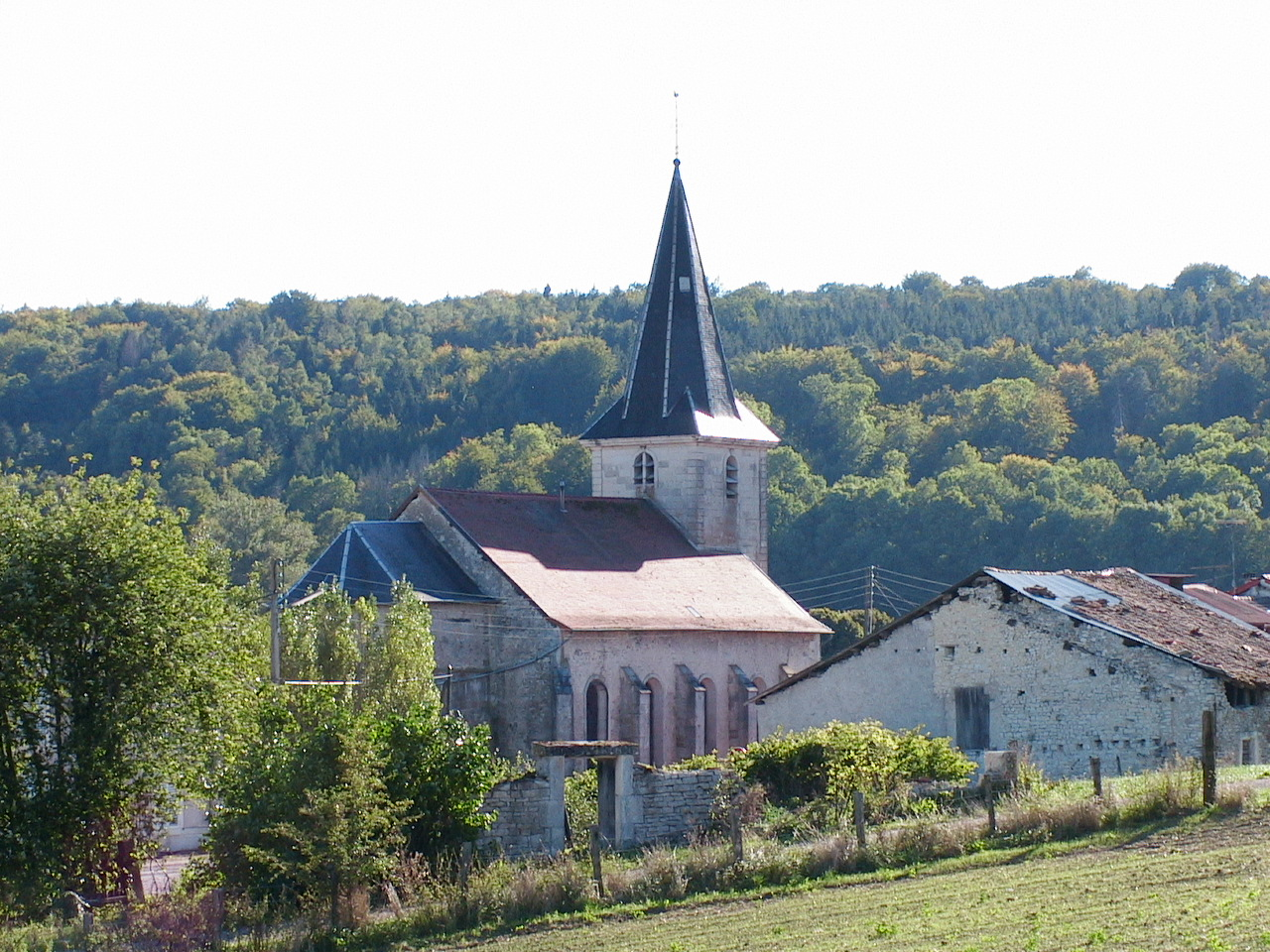
- The church in Broussey-en-Blois

- Coat of arms
- Location of Broussey-en-Blois
- Location within France Location within Grand Est
- Coordinates: 48°38′20″N 5°33′00″E
- Country: France
- Region: Grand Est
- Department: Meuse
- Arrondissement: Commercy
- Canton: Vaucouleurs

Government
  - Mayor (2020–2026): Stéphanie Belmont
- Area^{1}: 11.04 km^{2} (4.26 sq mi)
- Elevation: 290 m (950 ft)
- Highest elevation: 416 m (1,365 ft)
- Lowest elevation: 266 m (873 ft)
- Population (2023): 57
  - Density: 5.2/km^{2} (13/sq mi)
- Time zone: UTC+01:00 (CET)
  - Summer (DST): UTC+02:00 (CEST)
- INSEE/Postal code: 55084 /55190
- ^{1} French Land Register data, which excludes lakes, ponds, glaciers > 1 km^{2} (0.386 sq mi or 247 acres) and river estuaries.

Broussey-en-Blois (French pronunciation: [bʁusɛ ɑ̃ blwa]) is a commune in the Meuse department in Grand Est in northeastern France.

== Population ==
Historical population
Year	Pop.	±% p.a.
1968	74	—
1975	57	−3.66%
1982	45	−3.32%
1990	54	+2.31%
1999	62	+1.55%
2007	64	+0.40%
2012	54	−3.34%
2017	59	+1.79%
2023	57	−0.57%
Source: INSEE

== See also ==
- Communes of the Meuse department
