= Saulvaux =

- Commune
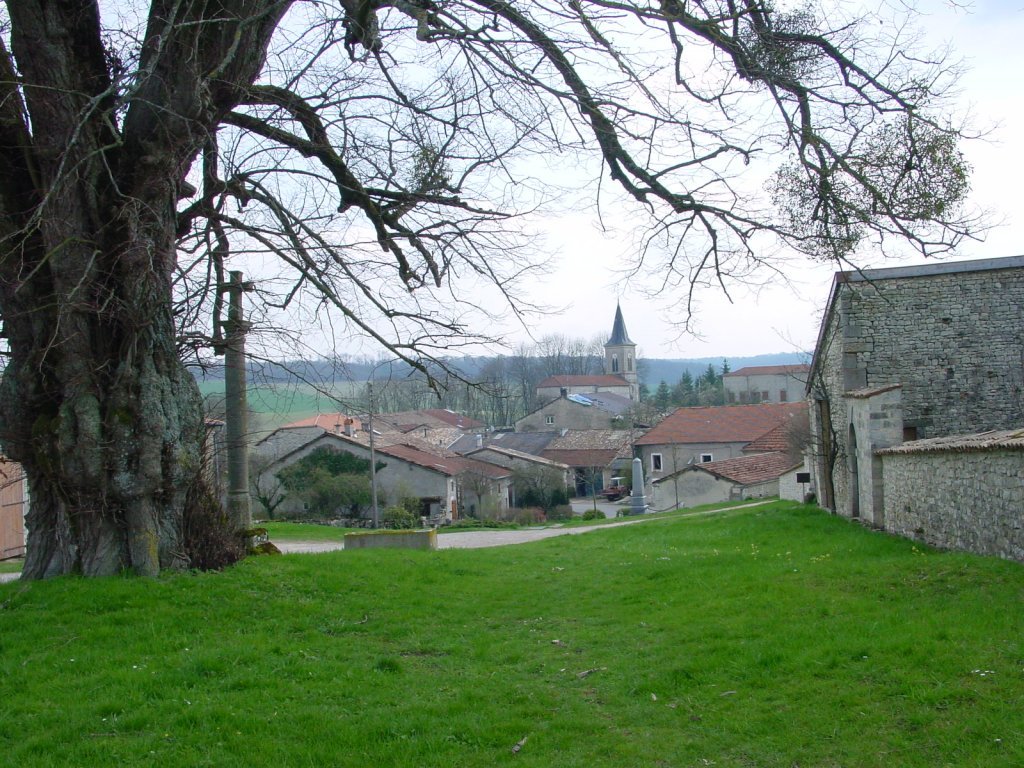
- The village of Vaux-la-Petite in Saulvaux

- Coat of arms
- Location of Saulvaux
- Location within France Location within Grand Est
- Coordinates: 48°42′33″N 5°28′45″E
- Country: France
- Region: Grand Est
- Department: Meuse
- Arrondissement: Commercy
- Canton: Vaucouleurs

Government
  - Mayor (2020–2026): Gilles Etienne
- Area^{1}: 22.42 km^{2} (8.66 sq mi)
- Elevation: 327 m (1,073 ft)
- Highest elevation: 402 m (1,319 ft)
- Lowest elevation: 270 m (890 ft)
- Population (2023): 111
  - Density: 4.95/km^{2} (12.8/sq mi)
- Time zone: UTC+01:00 (CET)
  - Summer (DST): UTC+02:00 (CEST)
- INSEE/Postal code: 55472 /55500
- ^{1} French Land Register data, which excludes lakes, ponds, glaciers > 1 km^{2} (0.386 sq mi or 247 acres) and river estuaries.

Saulvaux (French pronunciation: [solvo]) is a commune in the Meuse department in Grand Est in north-eastern France.

== See also ==
- Communes of the Meuse department
