= Moselle-Line =

The Moselle-Line was the designation of a line of French barrier forts (forts d'arrêt) on the upper Moselle between the fortresses of Épinal and Belfort.

The purpose of this line, the separate forts of which command the relatively few lines of advance from upper Alsace through the Vosges, was to deflect a possible German invasion from Alsace either towards Belfort or towards the open gap between Épinal and Toul called the Trouée d'Épinal.

== See also ==
- Meuse-Line
