= Méligny-le-Grand =

- Commune
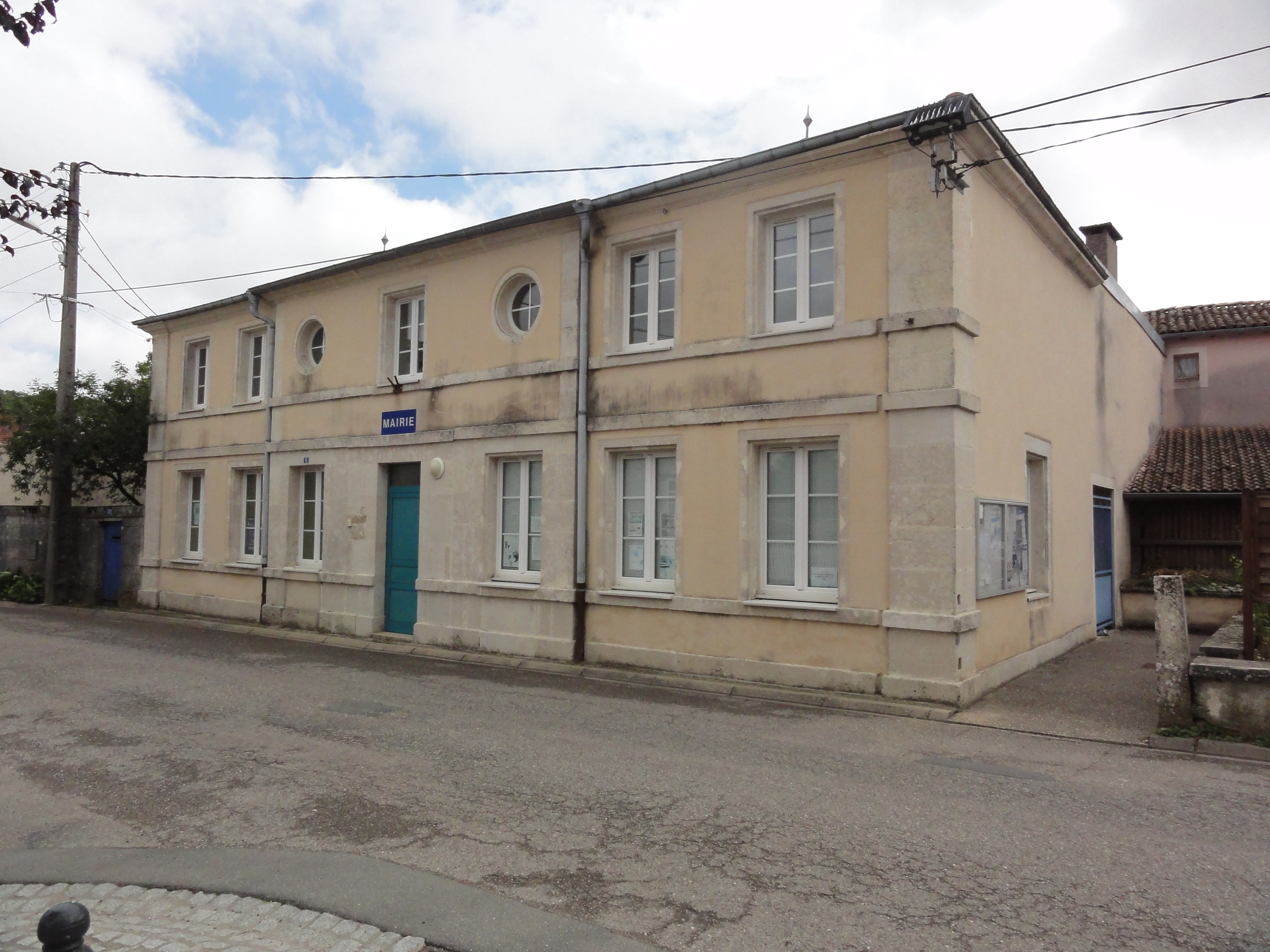
- The town hall in Méligny-le-Grand

- Coat of arms
- Location of Méligny-le-Grand
- Location within France Location within Grand Est
- Coordinates: 48°40′41″N 5°29′35″E
- Country: France
- Region: Grand Est
- Department: Meuse
- Arrondissement: Commercy
- Canton: Vaucouleurs
- Intercommunality: CC Commercy - Void - Vaucouleurs

Government
  - Mayor (2020–2026): Dominique Wagner
- Area^{1}: 11.52 km^{2} (4.45 sq mi)
- Elevation: 350 m (1,150 ft)
- Highest elevation: 412 m (1,352 ft)
- Lowest elevation: 307 m (1,007 ft)
- Population (2023): 88
  - Density: 7.6/km^{2} (20/sq mi)
- Time zone: UTC+01:00 (CET)
  - Summer (DST): UTC+02:00 (CEST)
- INSEE/Postal code: 55330 /55190
- ^{1} French Land Register data, which excludes lakes, ponds, glaciers > 1 km^{2} (0.386 sq mi or 247 acres) and river estuaries.

Méligny-le-Grand (French pronunciation: [meliɲi lə ɡʁɑ̃]) is a commune in the Meuse department in Grand Est in north-eastern France.

== See also ==
- Communes of the Meuse department
