= Burey-la-Côte =

- Commune
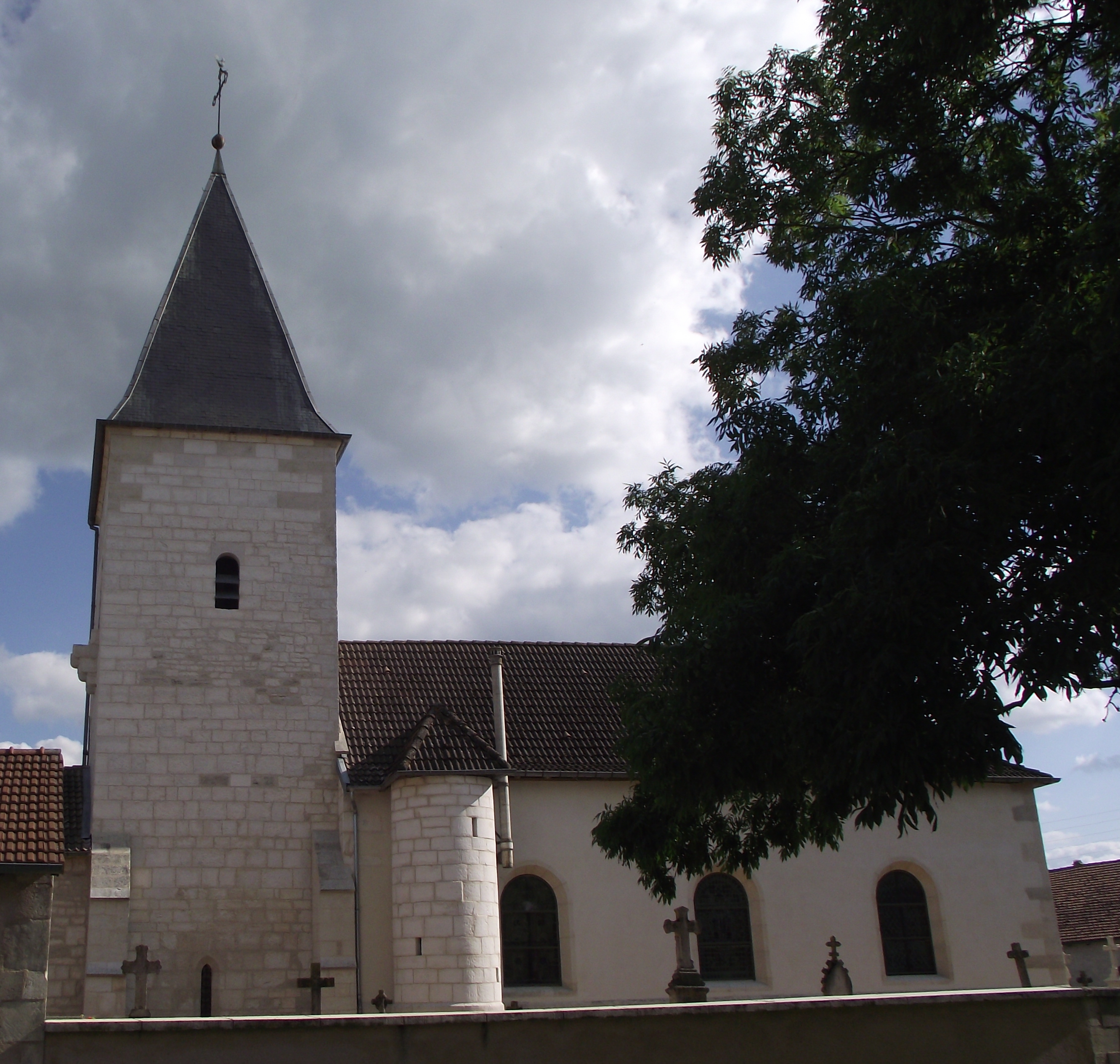
- The church in Burey-la-Côte

- Coat of arms
- Location of Burey-la-Côte
- Location within France Location within Grand Est
- Coordinates: 48°30′11″N 5°41′59″E
- Country: France
- Region: Grand Est
- Department: Meuse
- Arrondissement: Commercy
- Canton: Vaucouleurs

Government
  - Mayor (2020–2026): Jean-Michel Langard
- Area^{1}: 4.29 km^{2} (1.66 sq mi)
- Elevation: 294 m (965 ft)
- Highest elevation: 383 m (1,257 ft)
- Lowest elevation: 261 m (856 ft)
- Population (2023): 86
  - Density: 20/km^{2} (52/sq mi)
- Time zone: UTC+01:00 (CET)
  - Summer (DST): UTC+02:00 (CEST)
- INSEE/Postal code: 55089 /55140
- ^{1} French Land Register data, which excludes lakes, ponds, glaciers > 1 km^{2} (0.386 sq mi or 247 acres) and river estuaries.

Burey-la-Côte (French pronunciation: [byʁɛ la kot]) is a commune in the Meuse department in Grand Est in northeastern France.

== Population ==
Historical population
Year	Pop.	±% p.a.
1968	74	—
1975	70	−0.79%
1982	57	−2.89%
1990	52	−1.14%
1999	73	+3.84%
2007	65	−1.44%
2012	84	+5.26%
2017	87	+0.70%
2023	86	−0.19%
Source: INSEE

== See also ==
- Communes of the Meuse department
