= Bovée-sur-Barboure =

- Commune
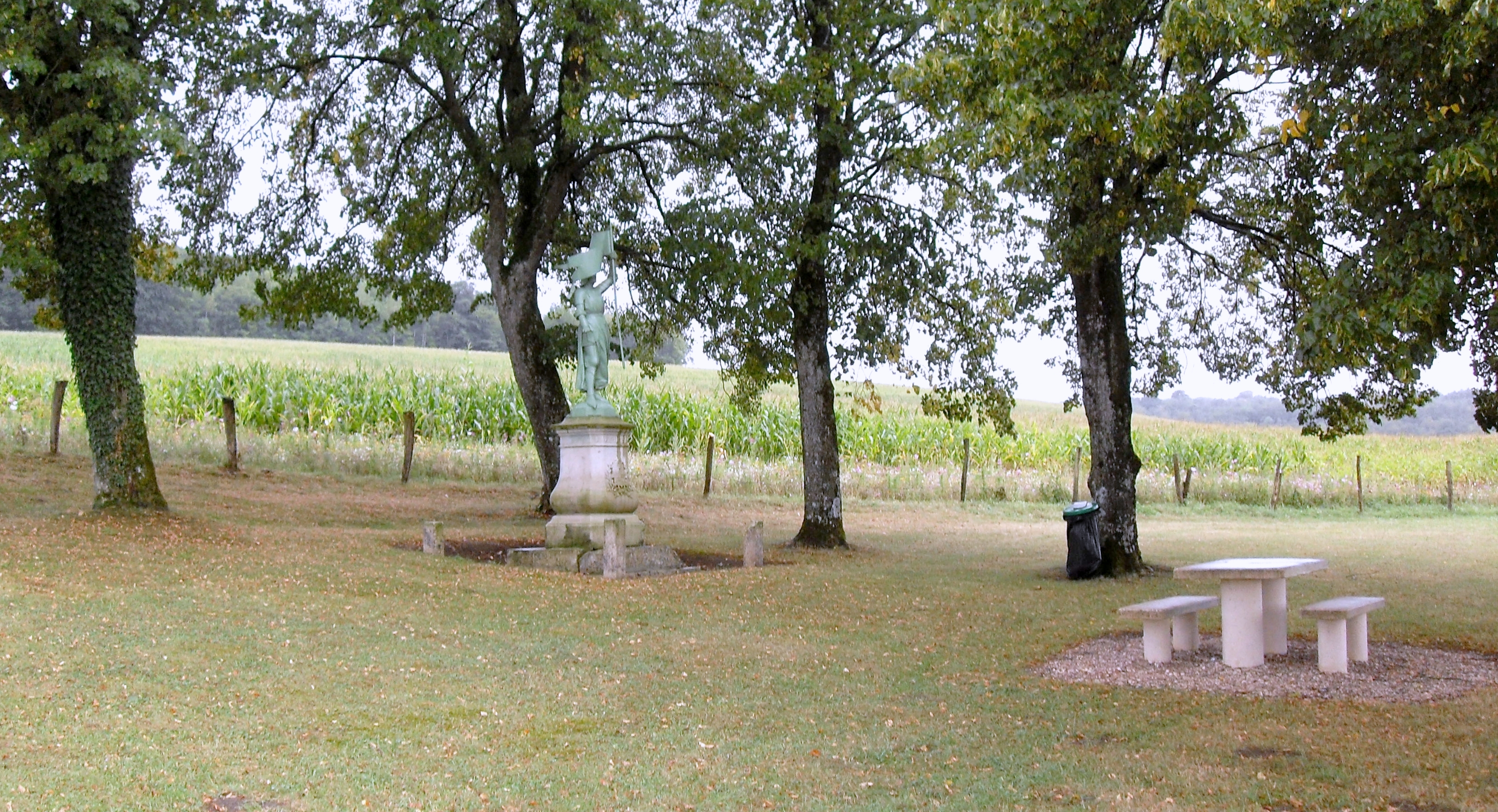
- A monument in Bovée

- Coat of arms
- Location of Bovée-sur-Barboure
- Location within France Location within Grand Est
- Coordinates: 48°38′43″N 5°30′45″E
- Country: France
- Region: Grand Est
- Department: Meuse
- Arrondissement: Commercy
- Canton: Vaucouleurs

Government
  - Mayor (2020–2026): Dominique Leroux
- Area^{1}: 13.37 km^{2} (5.16 sq mi)
- Elevation: 350 m (1,150 ft)
- Highest elevation: 393 m (1,289 ft)
- Lowest elevation: 294 m (965 ft)
- Population (2023): 133
  - Density: 9.95/km^{2} (25.8/sq mi)
- Time zone: UTC+01:00 (CET)
  - Summer (DST): UTC+02:00 (CEST)
- INSEE/Postal code: 55066 /55190
- ^{1} French Land Register data, which excludes lakes, ponds, glaciers > 1 km^{2} (0.386 sq mi or 247 acres) and river estuaries.

Bovée-sur-Barboure (French pronunciation: [bɔve syʁ baʁbuʁ]) is a commune in the Meuse department in Grand Est in northeastern France.

== Population ==
Historical population
Year	Pop.	±% p.a.
1968	164	—
1975	132	−3.05%
1982	110	−2.57%
1990	107	−0.35%
1999	121	+1.38%
2007	131	+1.00%
2012	146	+2.19%
2017	142	−0.55%
2023	133	−1.09%
Source: INSEE

== See also ==
- Communes of the Meuse department
