= Goussaincourt =

- Commune
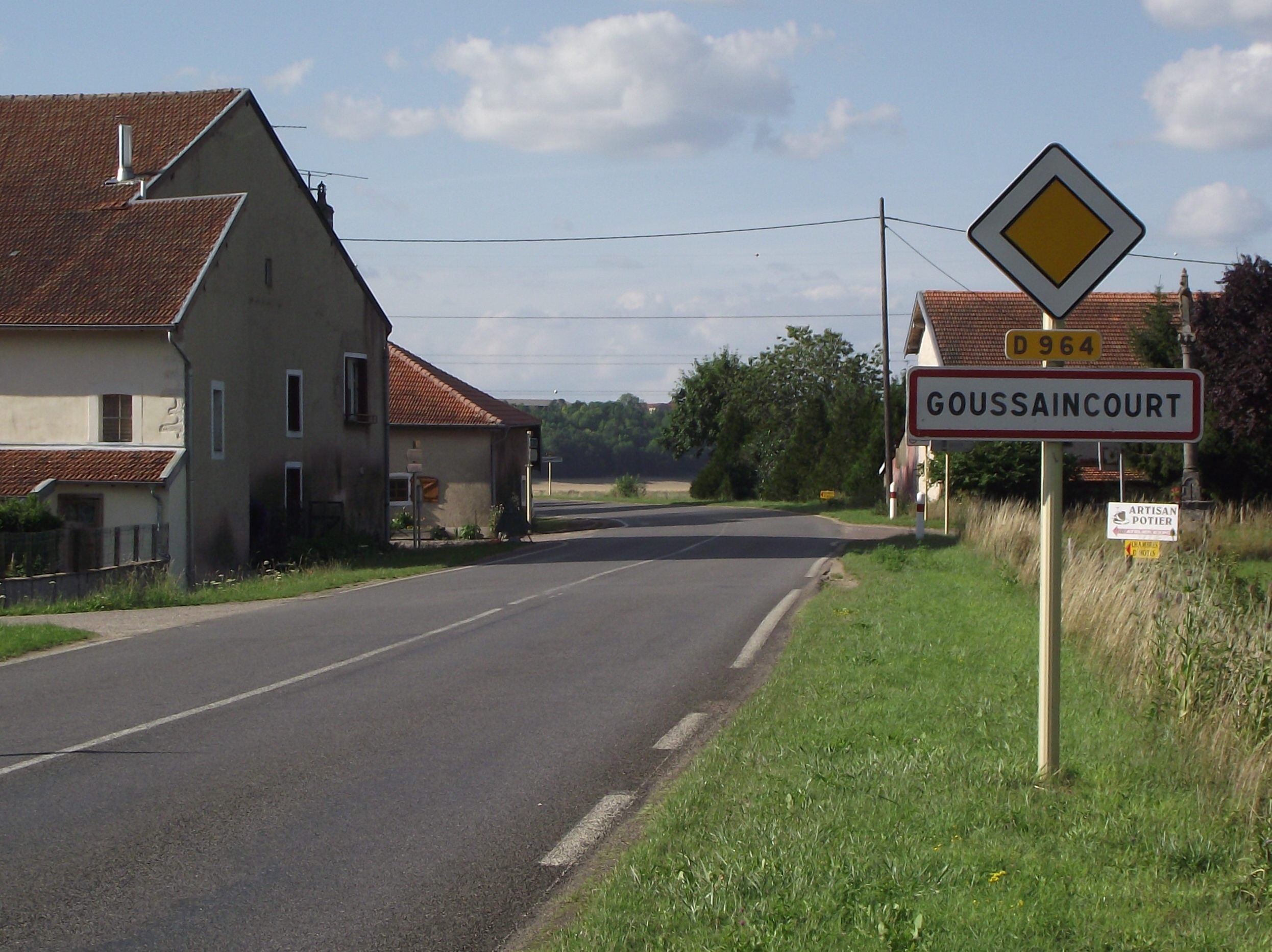
- The road into Goussaincourt

- Coat of arms
- Location of Goussaincourt
- Location within France Location within Grand Est
- Coordinates: 48°29′09″N 5°41′23″E
- Country: France
- Region: Grand Est
- Department: Meuse
- Arrondissement: Commercy
- Canton: Vaucouleurs

Government
  - Mayor (2020–2026): Michel Bissinger
- Area^{1}: 10.33 km^{2} (3.99 sq mi)
- Elevation: 285 m (935 ft)
- Highest elevation: 411 m (1,348 ft)
- Lowest elevation: 263 m (863 ft)
- Population (2023): 117
  - Density: 11.3/km^{2} (29.3/sq mi)
- Time zone: UTC+01:00 (CET)
  - Summer (DST): UTC+02:00 (CEST)
- INSEE/Postal code: 55217 /55140
- ^{1} French Land Register data, which excludes lakes, ponds, glaciers > 1 km^{2} (0.386 sq mi or 247 acres) and river estuaries.

Goussaincourt (French pronunciation: [ɡusɛ̃kuʁ]) is a commune in the Meuse department in Grand Est in north-eastern France.

== See also ==
- Communes of the Meuse department
