= Saint-Germain-sur-Meuse =

- Commune
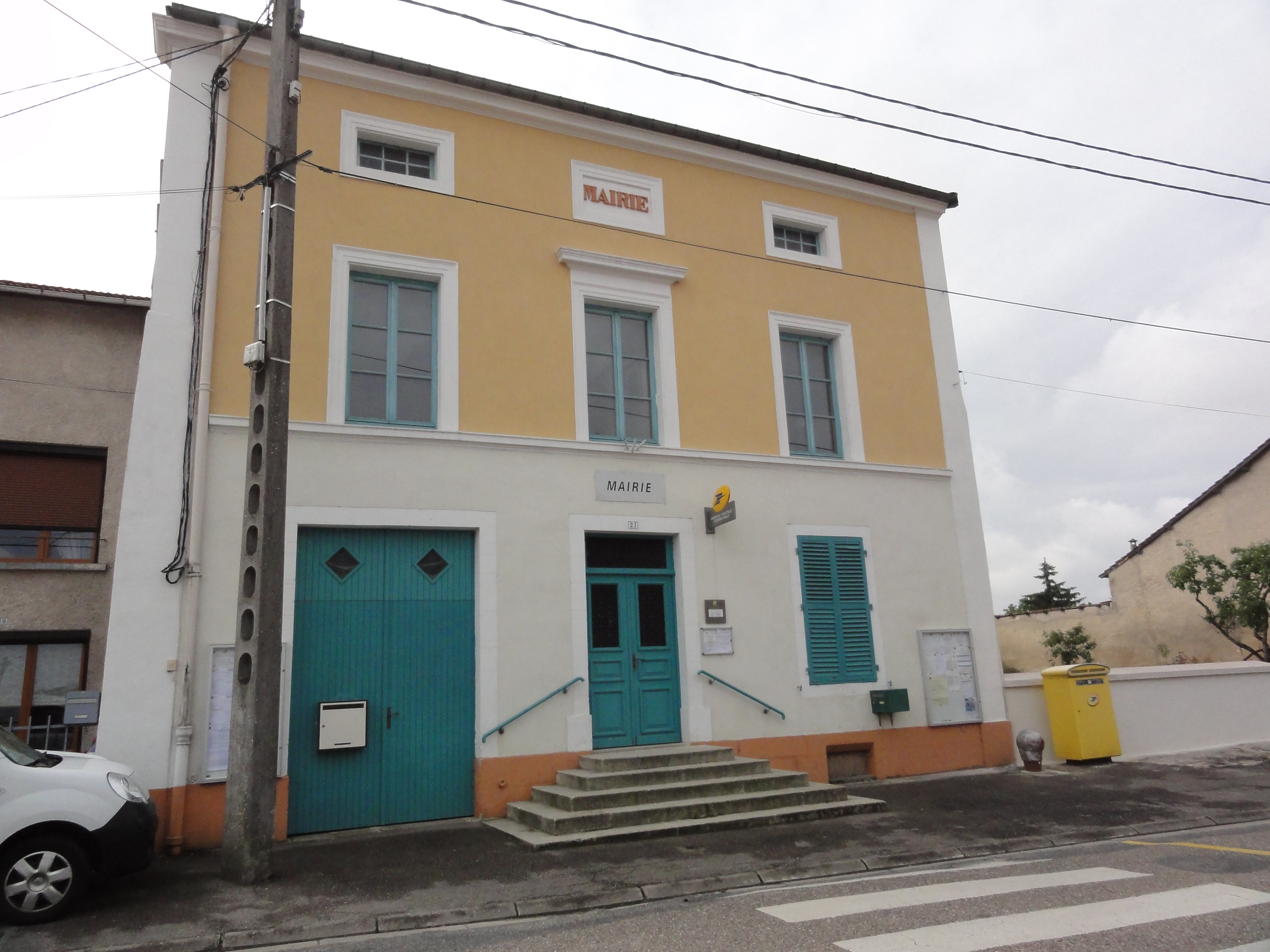
- The town hall in Saint-Germain-sur-Meuse

- Coat of arms
- Location of Saint-Germain-sur-Meuse
- Location within France Location within Grand Est
- Coordinates: 48°39′02″N 5°41′26″E
- Country: France
- Region: Grand Est
- Department: Meuse
- Arrondissement: Commercy
- Canton: Vaucouleurs

Government
  - Mayor (2020–2026): Rémi Potier
- Area^{1}: 7.67 km^{2} (2.96 sq mi)
- Elevation: 256 m (840 ft)
- Highest elevation: 395 m (1,296 ft)
- Lowest elevation: 240 m (790 ft)
- Population (2023): 224
  - Density: 29.2/km^{2} (75.6/sq mi)
- Time zone: UTC+01:00 (CET)
  - Summer (DST): UTC+02:00 (CEST)
- INSEE/Postal code: 55456 /55140
- ^{1} French Land Register data, which excludes lakes, ponds, glaciers > 1 km^{2} (0.386 sq mi or 247 acres) and river estuaries.

Saint-Germain-sur-Meuse (French pronunciation: [sɛ̃ ʒɛʁmɛ̃ syʁ møz], literally Saint-Germain on Meuse) is a commune in the Meuse department in Grand Est in north-eastern France.

== See also ==
- Communes of the Meuse department
