= Ourches-sur-Meuse =

- Commune
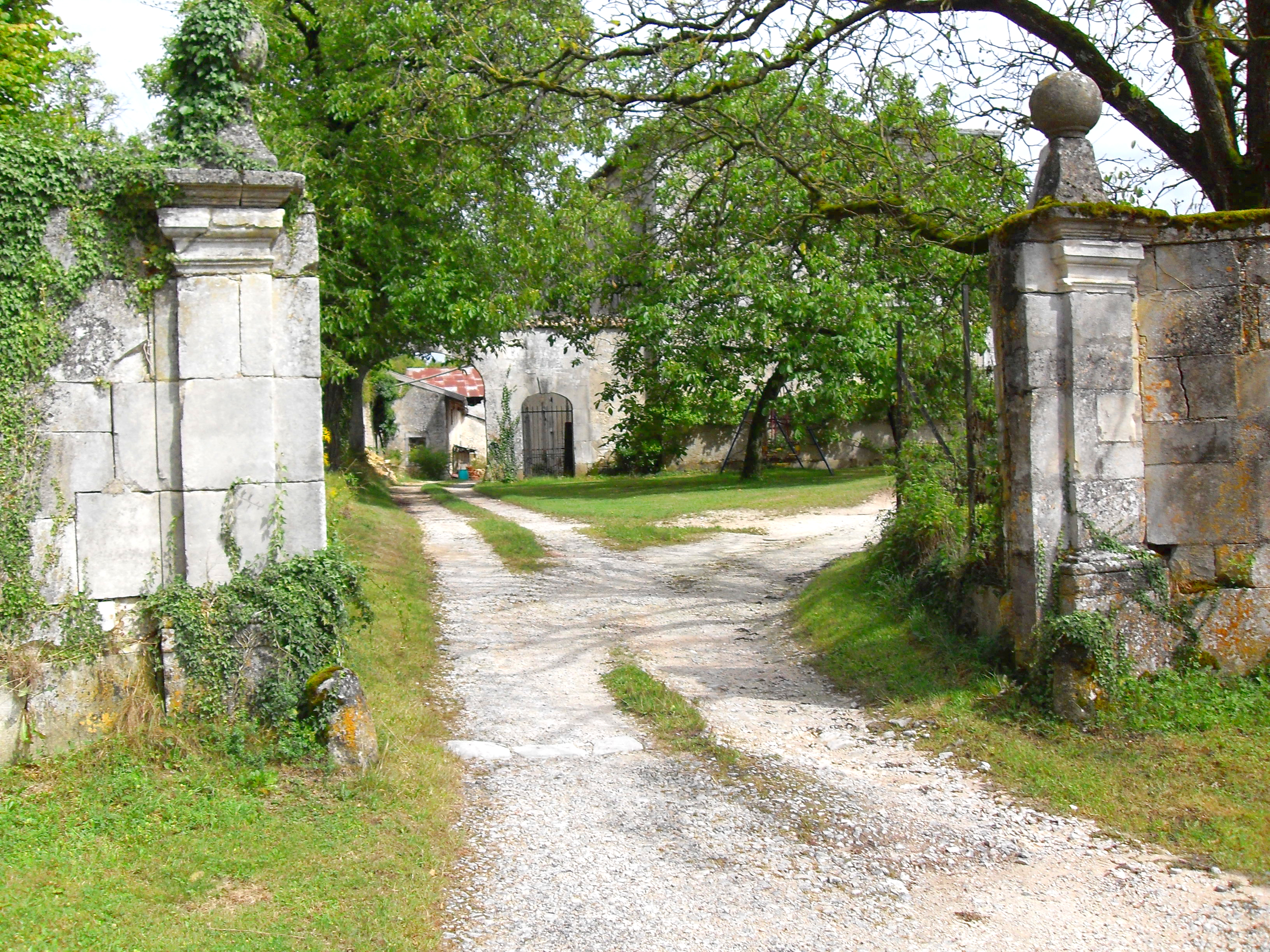
- Entrance of the château d'Ourches

- Coat of arms
- Location of Ourches-sur-Meuse
- Location within France Location within Grand Est
- Coordinates: 48°39′41″N 5°42′22″E
- Country: France
- Region: Grand Est
- Department: Meuse
- Arrondissement: Commercy
- Canton: Vaucouleurs

Government
  - Mayor (2020–2026): Jean-Louis Guillaume
- Area^{1}: 10.35 km^{2} (4.00 sq mi)
- Elevation: 249 m (817 ft)
- Highest elevation: 334 m (1,096 ft)
- Lowest elevation: 240 m (790 ft)
- Population (2023): 218
  - Density: 21.1/km^{2} (54.6/sq mi)
- Time zone: UTC+01:00 (CET)
  - Summer (DST): UTC+02:00 (CEST)
- INSEE/Postal code: 55396 /55190
- ^{1} French Land Register data, which excludes lakes, ponds, glaciers > 1 km^{2} (0.386 sq mi or 247 acres) and river estuaries.

Ourches-sur-Meuse (French pronunciation: [uʁʃ syʁ møz], literally Ourches on Meuse) is a commune in the Meuse department in Grand Est in north-eastern France.

== See also ==
- Communes of the Meuse department
