= Dagonville =

- Commune
- Coat of arms
- Location of Dagonville
- Location within France Location within Grand Est
- Coordinates: 48°47′33″N 5°23′50″E
- Country: France
- Region: Grand Est
- Department: Meuse
- Arrondissement: Commercy
- Canton: Vaucouleurs
- Intercommunality: Commercy-Void-Vaucouleurs

Government
  - Mayor (2020–2026): Dominique Wentz
- Area^{1}: 13.01 km^{2} (5.02 sq mi)
- Elevation: 300 m (980 ft)
- Highest elevation: 387 m (1,270 ft)
- Lowest elevation: 284 m (932 ft)
- Population (2023): 88
  - Density: 6.8/km^{2} (18/sq mi)
- Time zone: UTC+01:00 (CET)
  - Summer (DST): UTC+02:00 (CEST)
- INSEE/Postal code: 55141 /55500
- ^{1} French Land Register data, which excludes lakes, ponds, glaciers > 1 km^{2} (0.386 sq mi or 247 acres) and river estuaries.

Dagonville (French pronunciation: [daɡɔ̃vil]) is a commune in the Meuse department in Grand Est in north-eastern France.

== Population ==
The population of Dagonville has slowly declined since the beginning of census-taking in 1793; whereas the commune once (in 1851) housed as many as 356 people, as of 1999 it housed only 77.

Historical population
Year	Pop.	±% p.a.
1968	106	—
1975	94	−1.70%
1982	91	−0.46%
1990	85	−0.85%
1999	77	−1.09%
2007	81	+0.64%
2012	82	+0.25%
2017	85	+0.72%
2023	88	+0.58%
Source: INSEE

== See also ==
- Communes of the Meuse department
