= Reffroy =

- Commune
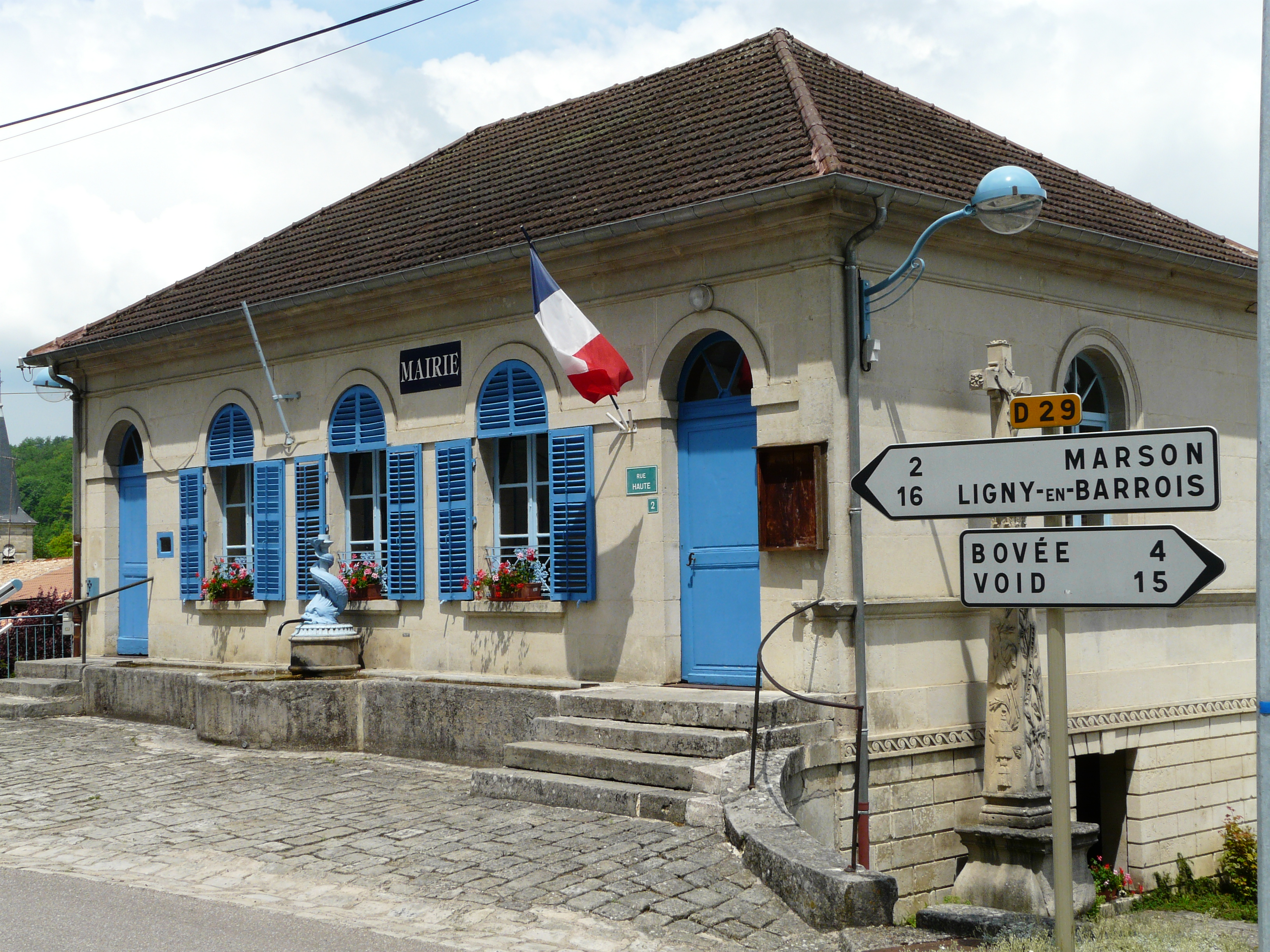
- The town hall in Reffroy

- Coat of arms
- Location of Reffroy
- Location within France Location within Grand Est
- Coordinates: 48°37′56″N 5°27′56″E
- Country: France
- Region: Grand Est
- Department: Meuse
- Arrondissement: Commercy
- Canton: Vaucouleurs

Government
  - Mayor (2020–2026): Francis Leclerc
- Area^{1}: 9.41 km^{2} (3.63 sq mi)
- Elevation: 295 m (968 ft)
- Highest elevation: 403 m (1,322 ft)
- Lowest elevation: 275 m (902 ft)
- Population (2023): 72
  - Density: 7.7/km^{2} (20/sq mi)
- Time zone: UTC+01:00 (CET)
  - Summer (DST): UTC+02:00 (CEST)
- INSEE/Postal code: 55421 /55190
- ^{1} French Land Register data, which excludes lakes, ponds, glaciers > 1 km^{2} (0.386 sq mi or 247 acres) and river estuaries.

Reffroy (French pronunciation: [ʁɛfʁwa]) is a commune in the Meuse department in Grand Est in north-eastern France.

== See also ==
- Communes of the Meuse department
