= Canton of Vaucouleurs =

Coordinates: 48.60°N 5.67°E

The canton of Vaucouleurs is an administrative division of the Meuse department, northeastern France. Its borders were modified at the French canton reorganisation which came into effect in March 2015. Its seat is in Vaucouleurs.

It consists of the following communes:

1. Bovée-sur-Barboure
2. Boviolles
3. Brixey-aux-Chanoines
4. Broussey-en-Blois
5. Burey-en-Vaux
6. Burey-la-Côte
7. Chalaines
8. Champougny
9. Cousances-lès-Triconville
10. Culey
11. Dagonville
12. Épiez-sur-Meuse
13. Erneville-aux-Bois
14. Goussaincourt
15. Laneuville-au-Rupt
16. Loisey
17. Marson-sur-Barboure
18. Maxey-sur-Vaise
19. Méligny-le-Grand
20. Méligny-le-Petit
21. Ménil-la-Horgne
22. Montbras
23. Montigny-lès-Vaucouleurs
24. Naives-en-Blois
25. Nançois-le-Grand
26. Nançois-sur-Ornain
27. Neuville-lès-Vaucouleurs
28. Ourches-sur-Meuse
29. Pagny-la-Blanche-Côte
30. Pagny-sur-Meuse
31. Reffroy
32. Rigny-la-Salle
33. Rigny-Saint-Martin
34. Saint-Aubin-sur-Aire
35. Saint-Germain-sur-Meuse
36. Salmagne
37. Saulvaux
38. Sauvigny
39. Sauvoy
40. Sepvigny
41. Sorcy-Saint-Martin
42. Taillancourt
43. Troussey
44. Ugny-sur-Meuse
45. Vaucouleurs
46. Villeroy-sur-Méholle
47. Void-Vacon
48. Willeroncourt
