= Taillancourt =

- Commune
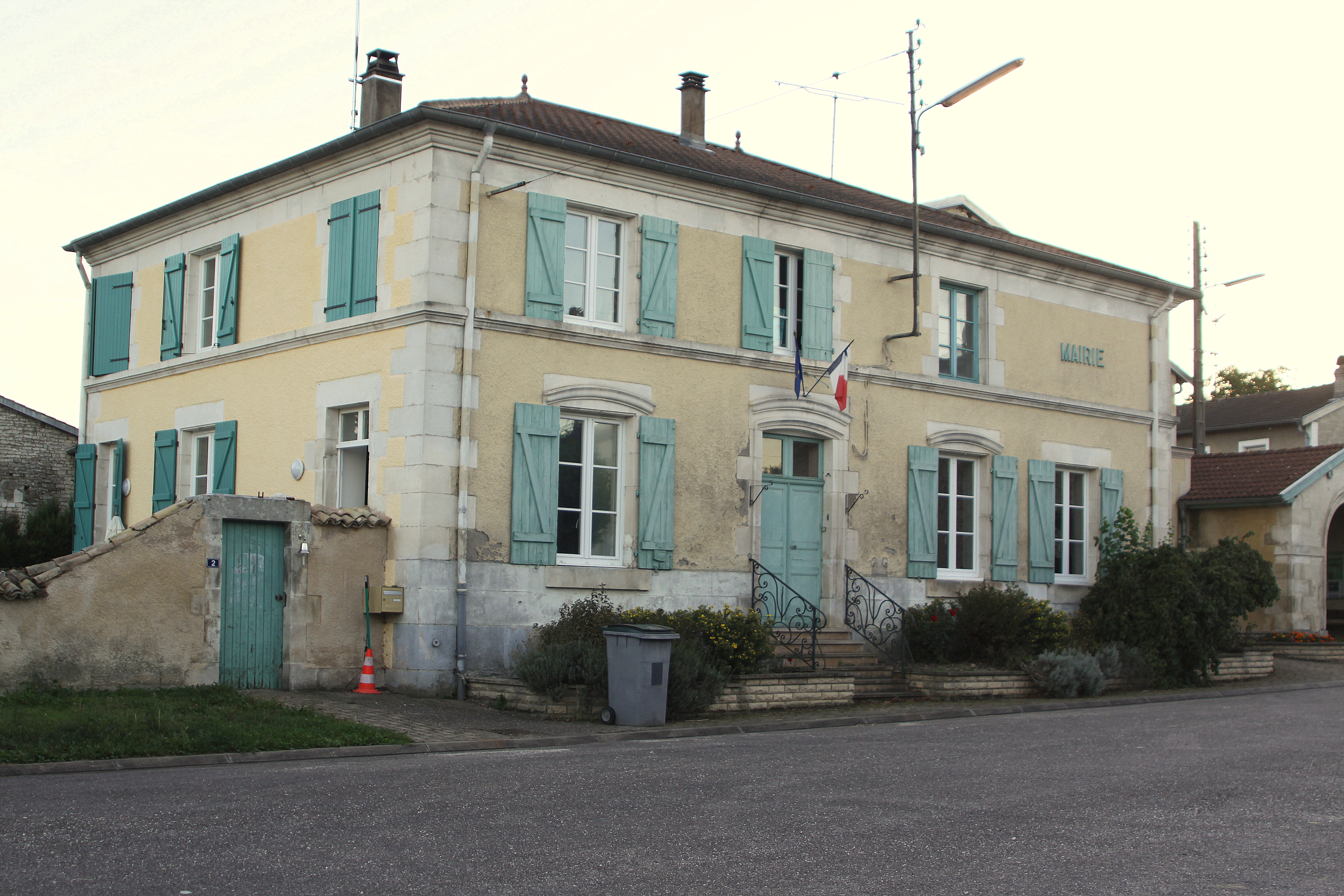
- The town hall in Taillancourt

- Coat of arms
- Location of Taillancourt
- Location within France Location within Grand Est
- Coordinates: 48°31′55″N 5°41′42″E
- Country: France
- Region: Grand Est
- Department: Meuse
- Arrondissement: Commercy
- Canton: Vaucouleurs

Government
  - Mayor (2020–2026): François Mazelin
- Area^{1}: 11.09 km^{2} (4.28 sq mi)
- Elevation: 265 m (869 ft)
- Highest elevation: 422 m (1,385 ft)
- Lowest elevation: 257 m (843 ft)
- Population (2023): 126
  - Density: 11.4/km^{2} (29.4/sq mi)
- Time zone: UTC+01:00 (CET)
  - Summer (DST): UTC+02:00 (CEST)
- INSEE/Postal code: 55503 /55140
- ^{1} French Land Register data, which excludes lakes, ponds, glaciers > 1 km^{2} (0.386 sq mi or 247 acres) and river estuaries.

Taillancourt (French pronunciation: [tajɑ̃kuʁ]) is a commune in the Meuse department in Grand Est in north-eastern France.

Taillancourt is located in south-eastern department of Meuse. Bordering the Vosges and the south of the Meurthe and Moselle in the east, its axis the Meuse Valley. We also call the "Valley of color."

== See also ==
- Communes of the Meuse department
