= Sauvigny =

- Commune
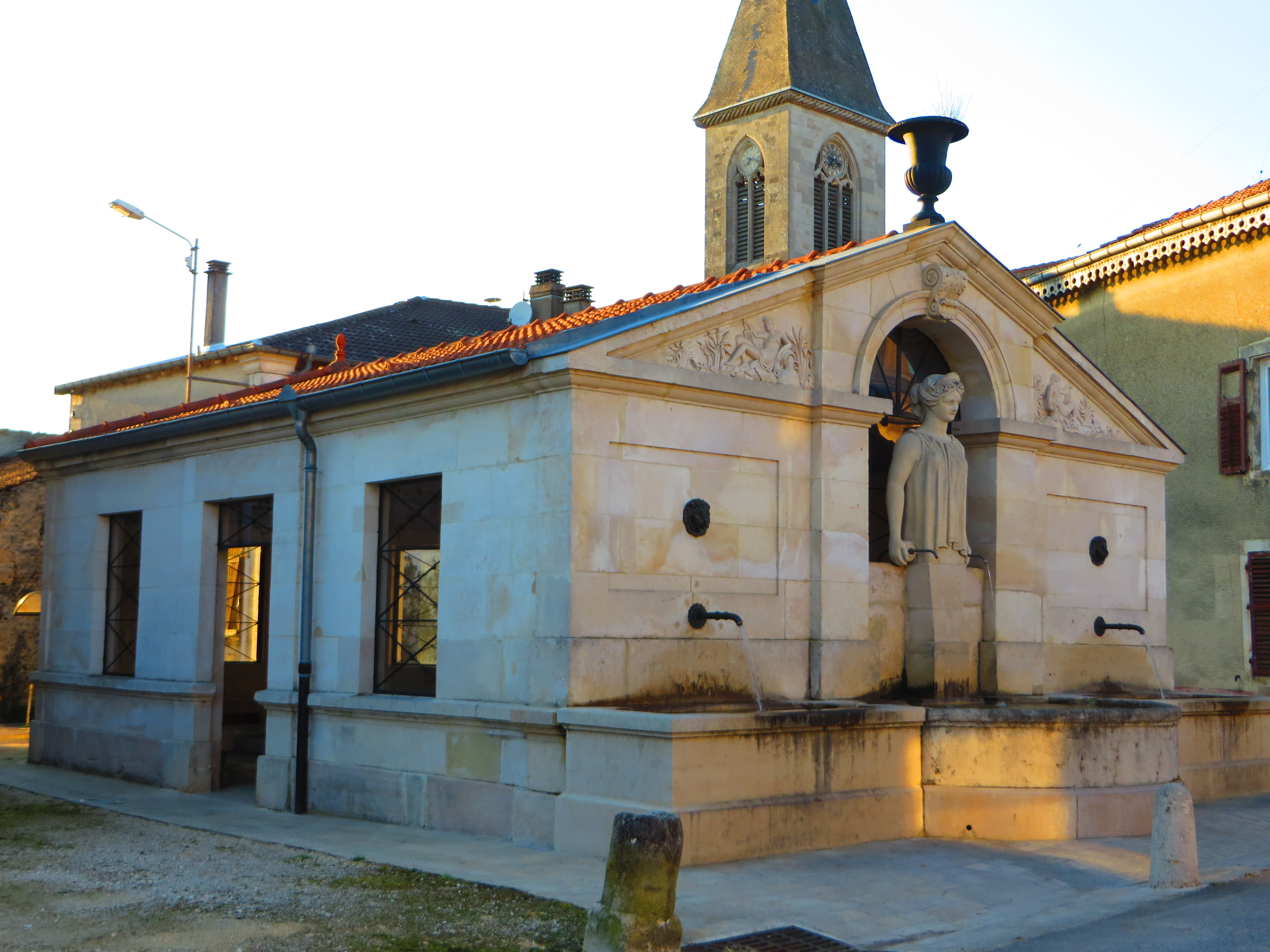
- The wash house in Sauvigny

- Coat of arms
- Location of Sauvigny
- Location within France Location within Grand Est
- Coordinates: 48°29′56″N 5°43′02″E
- Country: France
- Region: Grand Est
- Department: Meuse
- Arrondissement: Commercy
- Canton: Vaucouleurs

Government
  - Mayor (2021–2026): Jean-Luc Henry
- Area^{1}: 17.51 km^{2} (6.76 sq mi)
- Elevation: 271 m (889 ft)
- Highest elevation: 423 m (1,388 ft)
- Lowest elevation: 262 m (860 ft)
- Population (2023): 229
  - Density: 13.1/km^{2} (33.9/sq mi)
- Time zone: UTC+01:00 (CET)
  - Summer (DST): UTC+02:00 (CEST)
- INSEE/Postal code: 55474 /55140
- ^{1} French Land Register data, which excludes lakes, ponds, glaciers > 1 km^{2} (0.386 sq mi or 247 acres) and river estuaries.

Sauvigny (French pronunciation: [soviɲi]) is a commune in the Meuse department in Grand Est in north-eastern France.

== See also ==
- Communes of the Meuse department
