= Villeroy-sur-Méholle =

- Commune
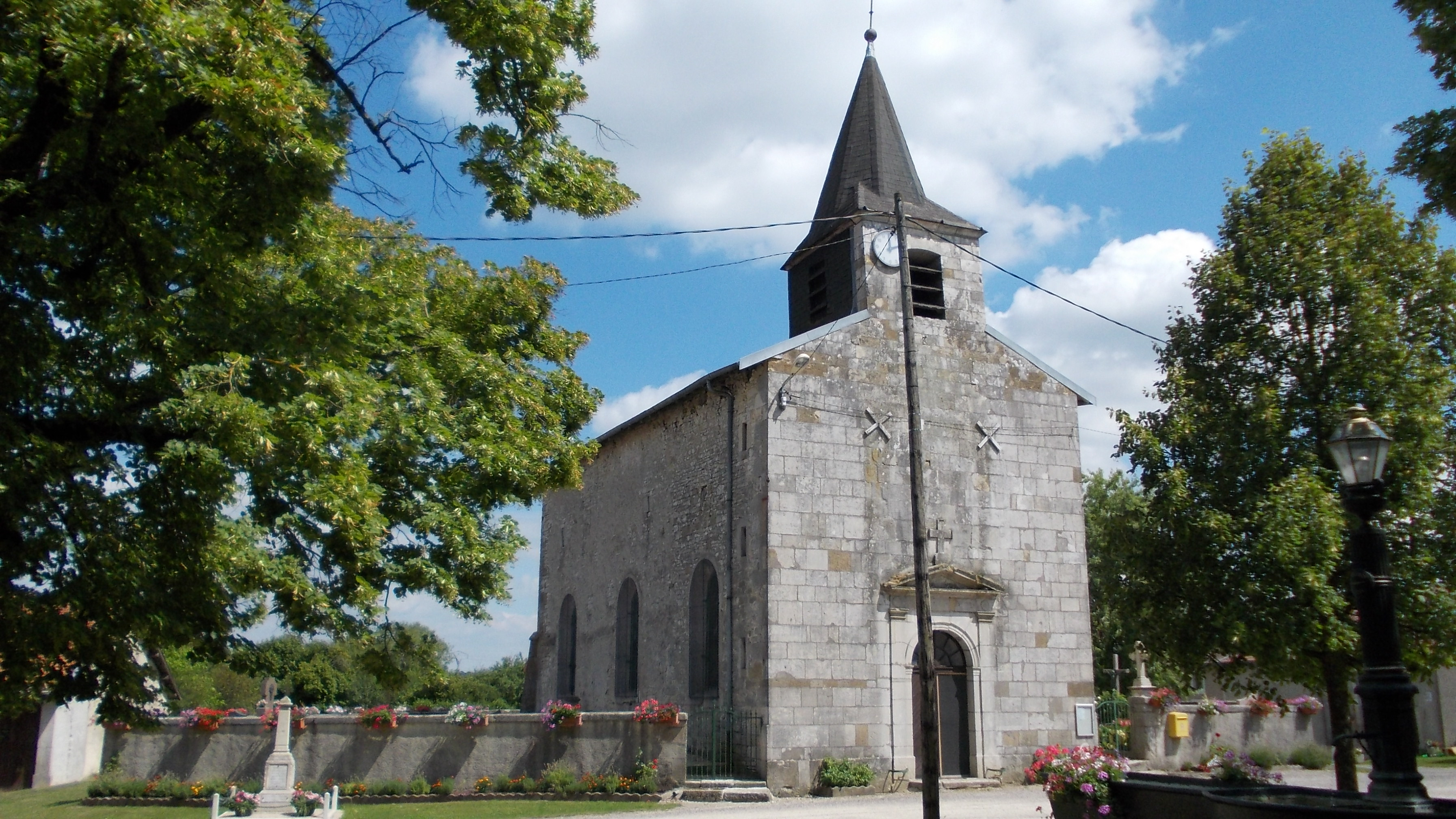
- The church in Villeroy-sur-Méholle

- Coat of arms
- Location of Villeroy-sur-Méholle
- Location within France Location within Grand Est
- Coordinates: 48°36′52″N 5°34′29″E
- Country: France
- Region: Grand Est
- Department: Meuse
- Arrondissement: Commercy
- Canton: Vaucouleurs

Government
  - Mayor (2020–2026): Eddy Laurent
- Area^{1}: 6.47 km^{2} (2.50 sq mi)
- Elevation: 340 m (1,120 ft)
- Highest elevation: 404 m (1,325 ft)
- Lowest elevation: 265 m (869 ft)
- Population (2023): 52
  - Density: 8.0/km^{2} (21/sq mi)
- Time zone: UTC+01:00 (CET)
  - Summer (DST): UTC+02:00 (CEST)
- INSEE/Postal code: 55559 /55190
- ^{1} French Land Register data, which excludes lakes, ponds, glaciers > 1 km^{2} (0.386 sq mi or 247 acres) and river estuaries.

Villeroy-sur-Méholle (French pronunciation: [vilʁwa syʁ me.ɔl]) is a commune in the Meuse department in Grand Est in north-eastern France.

== See also ==
- Communes of the Meuse department
