= Pagny-sur-Meuse =

- Commune
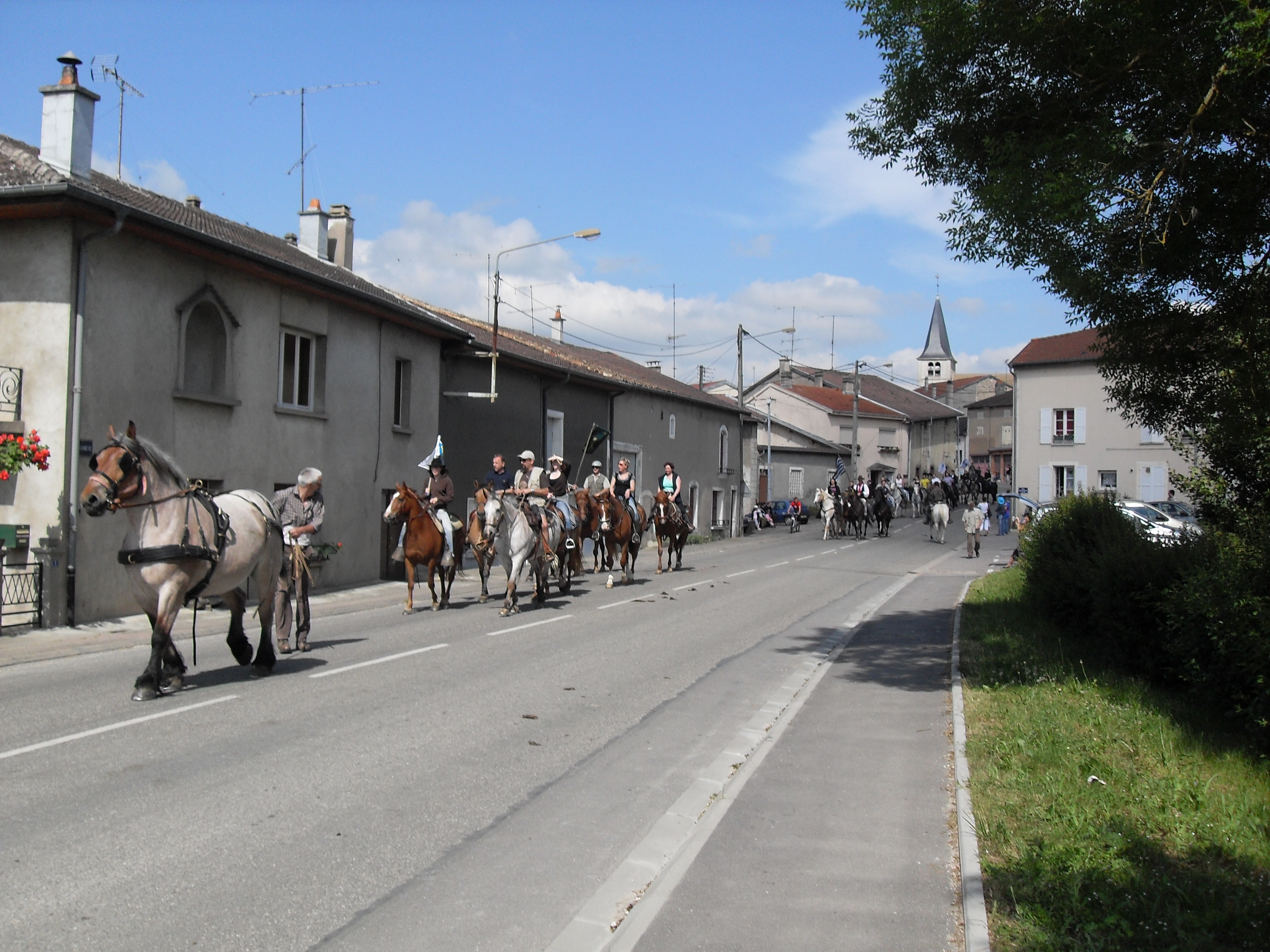
- Jour de fête

- Coat of arms
- Location of Pagny-sur-Meuse
- Location within France Location within Grand Est
- Coordinates: 48°41′18″N 5°43′06″E
- Country: France
- Region: Grand Est
- Department: Meuse
- Arrondissement: Commercy
- Canton: Vaucouleurs

Government
  - Mayor (2020–2026): Armand Pagliari
- Area^{1}: 18.81 km^{2} (7.26 sq mi)
- Highest elevation: 374 m (1,227 ft)
- Lowest elevation: 235 m (771 ft)
- Population (2023): 1,036
  - Density: 55.08/km^{2} (142.6/sq mi)
- Time zone: UTC+01:00 (CET)
  - Summer (DST): UTC+02:00 (CEST)
- INSEE/Postal code: 55398 /55190
- ^{1} French Land Register data, which excludes lakes, ponds, glaciers > 1 km^{2} (0.386 sq mi or 247 acres) and river estuaries.

Pagny-sur-Meuse (French pronunciation: [paɲi syʁ møz], literally Pagny on Meuse) is a commune in the Meuse department in Grand Est in north-eastern France.

== See also ==
- Communes of the Meuse department
