= Pagny-la-Blanche-Côte =

- Commune
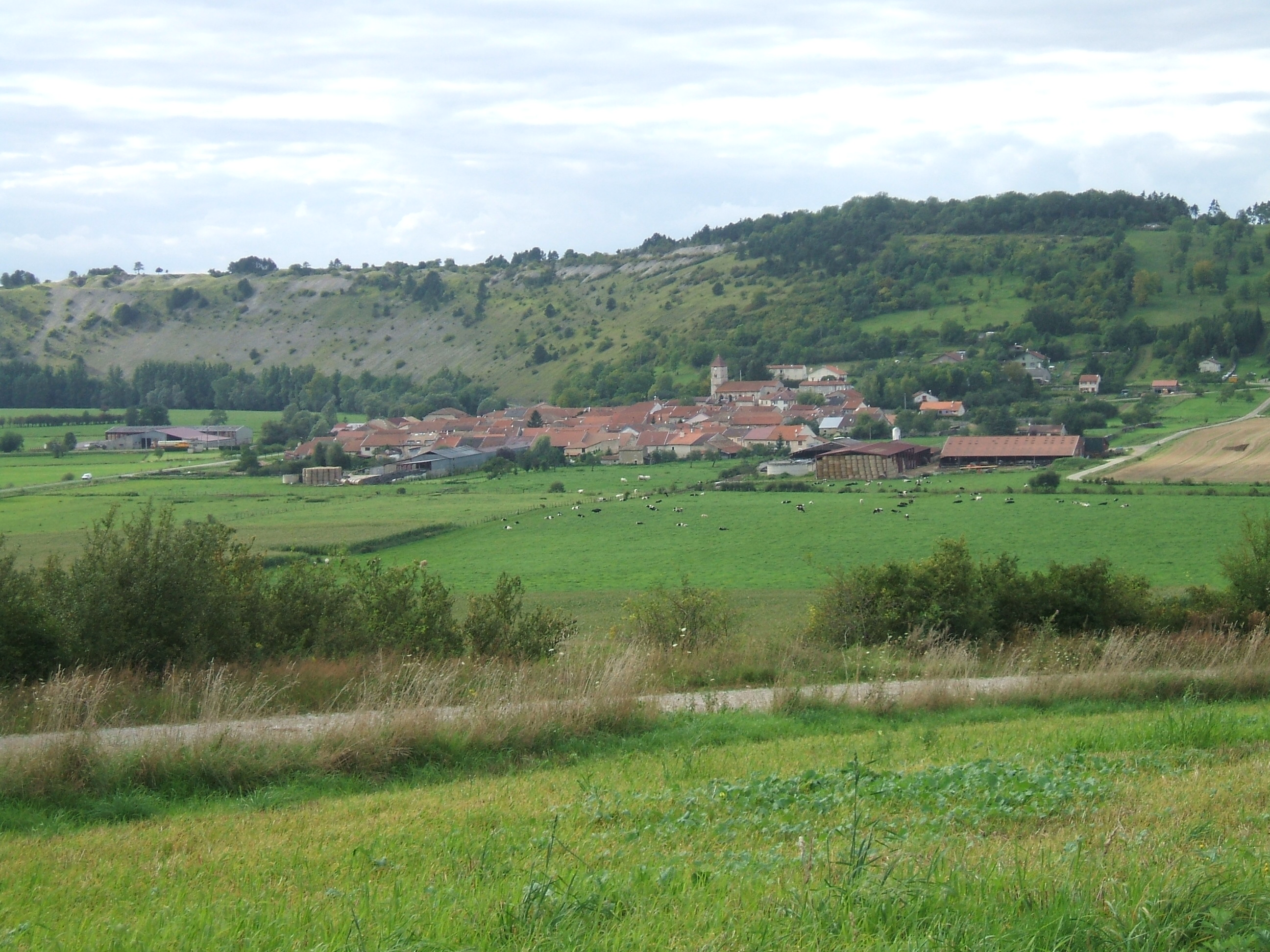
- The village see from the Tête des Rousseaux

- Coat of arms
- Location of Pagny-la-Blanche-Côte
- Location within France Location within Grand Est
- Coordinates: 48°32′30″N 5°43′19″E
- Country: France
- Region: Grand Est
- Department: Meuse
- Arrondissement: Commercy
- Canton: Vaucouleurs

Government
  - Mayor (2020–2026): Daniel Rouvenach
- Area^{1}: 12.43 km^{2} (4.80 sq mi)
- Highest elevation: 392 m (1,286 ft)
- Lowest elevation: 257 m (843 ft)
- Population (2023): 226
  - Density: 18.2/km^{2} (47.1/sq mi)
- Time zone: UTC+01:00 (CET)
  - Summer (DST): UTC+02:00 (CEST)
- INSEE/Postal code: 55397 /55140
- ^{1} French Land Register data, which excludes lakes, ponds, glaciers > 1 km^{2} (0.386 sq mi or 247 acres) and river estuaries.

Pagny-la-Blanche-Côte (French pronunciation: [paɲi la blɑ̃ʃ kot]) is a commune in the Meuse department in Grand Est in north-eastern France.

== See also ==
- Communes of the Meuse department
