= Canton of Vigneulles-lès-Hattonchâtel =

Former canton in Meuse, France

Coordinates: 48°59′11″N 5°39′08″E

- Former canton
- Location of the canton in the arrondissement of Commercy
- Country: France
- Region: Grand Est
- Department: Meuse
- No. of communes: {{{nbcomm}}}
- Disbanded: 2014

Government
  - Representatives: Sylvain Denoyelle
- Area: 272.31 km^{2} (105.14 sq mi)
- Population (2012): 3,808
  - Density: 13.98/km^{2} (36.22/sq mi)

The canton of Vigneulles-lès-Hattonchâtel (French: Canton de Vigneulles-lès-Hattonchâtel) is a former French canton located in the department of Meuse in the Lorraine region (now part of Grand Est). This canton was organized around Vigneulles-lès-Hattonchâtel in the arrondissement of Commercy. It is now part of the canton of Saint-Mihiel.

The last general councillor from this canton was Sylvain Denoyelle (DVD), elected in 2001.

== History ==
The canton of Vigneulles-lès-Hattonchâtel was part of the district of Saint-Mihiel, created by the decree of 30 January 1790.

After the abolition of the districts in 1795, the canton became part of the arrondissement of Commercy when it was created in 1801.

In 1924, following the renaming of the main town of Vigneulles to Vigneulles-lès-Hattonchâtel, the canton also changed its name to become the canton of Vigneulles-lès-Hattonchâtel.

Following the cantonal reorganization of 2014, the canton was abolished. All the municipalities were integrated into the canton of Saint-Mihiel.

== Composition ==
The canton of Vigneulles-lès-Hattonchâtel grouped together 14 municipalities and had 3,808 inhabitants (2012 census without double counts).

1. Beney-en-Woëvre
2. Buxières-sous-les-Côtes
3. Chaillon
4. Dompierre-aux-Bois
5. Heudicourt-sous-les-Côtes
6. Jonville-en-Woëvre
7. Lachaussée
8. Lamorville
9. Nonsard-Lamarche
10. Saint-Maurice-sous-les-Côtes
11. Seuzey
12. Valbois
13. Vaux-lès-Palameix
14. Vigneulles-lès-Hattonchâtel
