= Arrondissement of Commercy =

Coordinates: 48°46′N 5°35′E

Commercy
- Arrondissement
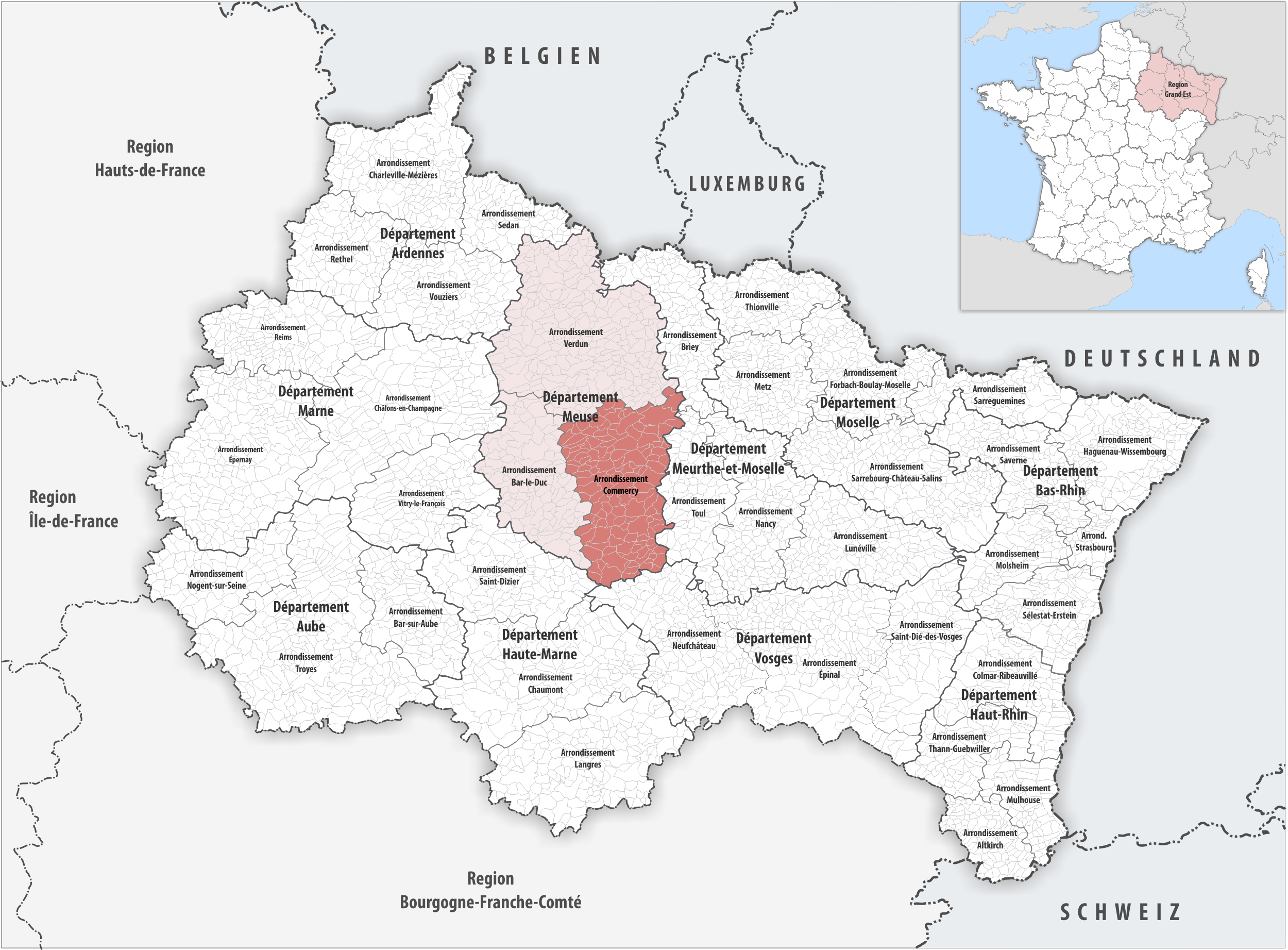
- Location within the region Grand Est
- Country: France
- Region: Grand Est
- Department: Meuse
- No. of communes: {{{nbcomm}}}
- Area: 1,932.2 km^{2} (746.0 sq mi)
- Population (2023): 41,772
  - Density: 21.619/km^{2} (55.993/sq mi)
- INSEE code: 552

The arrondissement of Commercy is an arrondissement of France in the Meuse department in the Grand Est region. It has 135 communes. Its population is 42,088 (2021), and its area is 1,932.2 km^{2} (746.0 sq mi).

== Composition ==
The communes of the arrondissement of Commercy, and their INSEE codes, are:

1. Abainville (55001)
2. Amanty (55005)
3. Apremont-la-Forêt (55012)
4. Badonvilliers-Gérauvilliers (55026)
5. Bannoncourt (55027)
6. Baudrémont (55032)
7. Belrain (55044)
8. Beney-en-Woëvre (55046)
9. Bislée (55054)
10. Boncourt-sur-Meuse (55058)
11. Bonnet (55059)
12. Bouconville-sur-Madt (55062)
13. Bouquemont (55064)
14. Bovée-sur-Barboure (55066)
15. Boviolles (55067)
16. Brixey-aux-Chanoines (55080)
17. Broussey-en-Blois (55084)
18. Broussey-Raulecourt (55085)
19. Burey-en-Vaux (55088)
20. Burey-la-Côte (55089)
21. Buxières-sous-les-Côtes (55093)
22. Chaillon (55096)
23. Chalaines (55097)
24. Champougny (55100)
25. Chassey-Beaupré (55104)
26. Chauvoncourt (55111)
27. Chonville-Malaumont (55114)
28. Commercy (55122)
29. Courcelles-en-Barrois (55127)
30. Courouvre (55129)
31. Cousances-lès-Triconville (55518)
32. Dagonville (55141)
33. Dainville-Bertheléville (55142)
34. Delouze-Rosières (55148)
35. Demange-Baudignécourt (55150)
36. Dompcevrin (55159)
37. Dompierre-aux-Bois (55160)
38. Épiez-sur-Meuse (55173)
39. Erneville-aux-Bois (55179)
40. Euville (55184)
41. Frémeréville-sous-les-Côtes (55196)
42. Fresnes-au-Mont (55197)
43. Geville (55258)
44. Gimécourt (55210)
45. Girauvoisin (55212)
46. Gondrecourt-le-Château (55215)
47. Goussaincourt (55217)
48. Grimaucourt-près-Sampigny (55220)
49. Han-sur-Meuse (55229)
50. Heudicourt-sous-les-Côtes (55245)
51. Horville-en-Ornois (55247)
52. Houdelaincourt (55248)
53. Jonville-en-Woëvre (55256)
54. Kœur-la-Grande (55263)
55. Kœur-la-Petite (55264)
56. Lachaussée (55267)
57. Lacroix-sur-Meuse (55268)
58. Lahaymeix (55269)
59. Lahayville (55270)
60. Lamorville (55274)
61. Laneuville-au-Rupt (55278)
62. Lavallée (55282)
63. Lérouville (55288)
64. Levoncourt (55289)
65. Lignières-sur-Aire (55290)
66. Longchamps-sur-Aire (55301)
67. Loupmont (55303)
68. Maizey (55312)
69. Marson-sur-Barboure (55322)
70. Mauvages (55327)
71. Maxey-sur-Vaise (55328)
72. Mécrin (55329)
73. Méligny-le-Grand (55330)
74. Méligny-le-Petit (55331)
75. Ménil-aux-Bois (55333)
76. Ménil-la-Horgne (55334)
77. Montbras (55344)
78. Montigny-lès-Vaucouleurs (55350)
79. Montsec (55353)
80. Naives-en-Blois (55368)
81. Nançois-le-Grand (55371)
82. Neuville-en-Verdunois (55380)
83. Neuville-lès-Vaucouleurs (55381)
84. Nicey-sur-Aire (55384)
85. Nonsard-Lamarche (55386)
86. Ourches-sur-Meuse (55396)
87. Pagny-la-Blanche-Côte (55397)
88. Pagny-sur-Meuse (55398)
89. Les Paroches (55401)
90. Pierrefitte-sur-Aire (55404)
91. Pont-sur-Meuse (55407)
92. Rambucourt (55412)
93. Ranzières (55415)
94. Reffroy (55421)
95. Richecourt (55431)
96. Rigny-la-Salle (55433)
97. Rigny-Saint-Martin (55434)
98. Les Roises (55436)
99. Rouvrois-sur-Meuse (55444)
100. Rupt-devant-Saint-Mihiel (55448)
101. Saint-Aubin-sur-Aire (55454)
102. Saint-Germain-sur-Meuse (55456)
103. Saint-Joire (55459)
104. Saint-Julien-sous-les-Côtes (55460)
105. Saint-Maurice-sous-les-Côtes (55462)
106. Saint-Mihiel (55463)
107. Sampigny (55467)
108. Saulvaux (55472)
109. Sauvigny (55474)
110. Sauvoy (55475)
111. Sepvigny (55485)
112. Seuzey (55487)
113. Sorcy-Saint-Martin (55496)
114. Taillancourt (55503)
115. Thillombois (55506)
116. Tréveray (55516)
117. Troussey (55520)
118. Troyon (55521)
119. Ugny-sur-Meuse (55522)
120. Vadonville (55526)
121. Valbois (55530)
122. Varnéville (55528)
123. Vaucouleurs (55533)
124. Vaudeville-le-Haut (55534)
125. Vaux-lès-Palameix (55540)
126. Vigneulles-lès-Hattonchâtel (55551)
127. Vignot (55553)
128. Ville-devant-Belrain (55555)
129. Villeroy-sur-Méholle (55559)
130. Villotte-sur-Aire (55570)
131. Void-Vacon (55573)
132. Vouthon-Bas (55574)
133. Vouthon-Haut (55575)
134. Woimbey (55584)
135. Xivray-et-Marvoisin (55586)

== History ==
The arrondissement of Commercy was created in 1800.

As a result of the reorganisation of the cantons of France which came into effect in 2015, the borders of the cantons are no longer related to the borders of the arrondissements. The cantons of the arrondissement of Commercy were, as of January 2015:

1. Commercy
2. Gondrecourt-le-Château
3. Pierrefitte-sur-Aire
4. Saint-Mihiel
5. Vaucouleurs
6. Vigneulles-lès-Hattonchâtel
7. Void-Vacon
