= Courcelles-en-Barrois =

- Commune
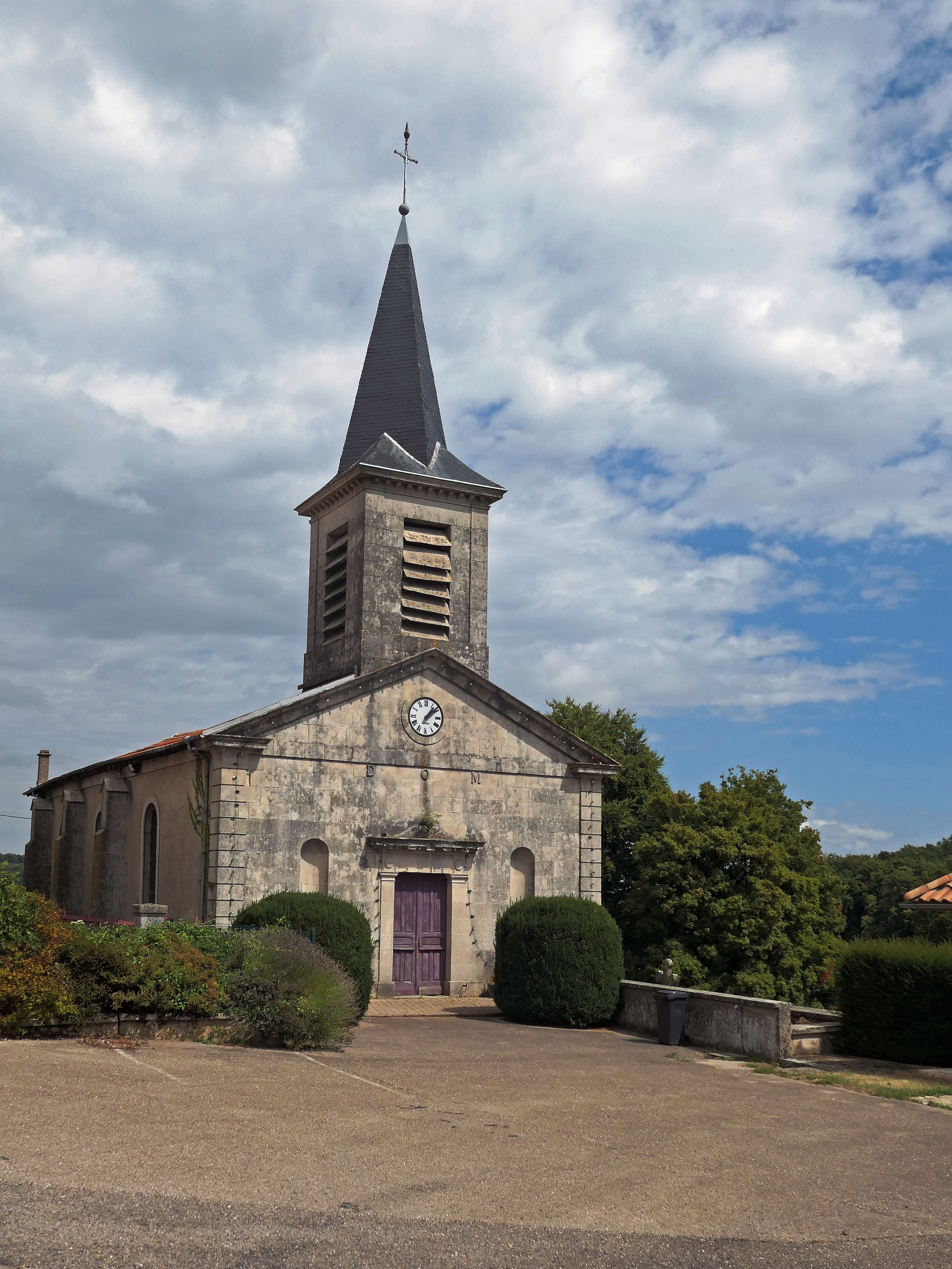

- Coat of arms
- Location of Courcelles-en-Barrois
- Location within France Location within Grand Est
- Coordinates: 48°49′32″N 5°26′32″E
- Country: France
- Region: Grand Est
- Department: Meuse
- Arrondissement: Commercy
- Canton: Dieue-sur-Meuse
- Intercommunality: CC de l'Aire à l'Argonne

Government
  - Mayor (2020–2026): Angélique Thill
- Area^{1}: 7.27 km^{2} (2.81 sq mi)
- Elevation: 354 m (1,161 ft)
- Highest elevation: 357 m (1,171 ft)
- Lowest elevation: 268 m (879 ft)
- Population (2023): 49
  - Density: 6.7/km^{2} (17/sq mi)
- Time zone: UTC+01:00 (CET)
  - Summer (DST): UTC+02:00 (CEST)
- INSEE/Postal code: 55127 /55260
- ^{1} French Land Register data, which excludes lakes, ponds, glaciers > 1 km^{2} (0.386 sq mi or 247 acres) and river estuaries.

Courcelles-en-Barrois (French pronunciation: [kuʁsɛl ɑ̃ baʁwa], lit. 'Courcelles in Barrois') is a commune in the Meuse department in Grand Est in north-eastern France.

== See also ==
- Communes of the Meuse department
