= Woimbey =

- Commune
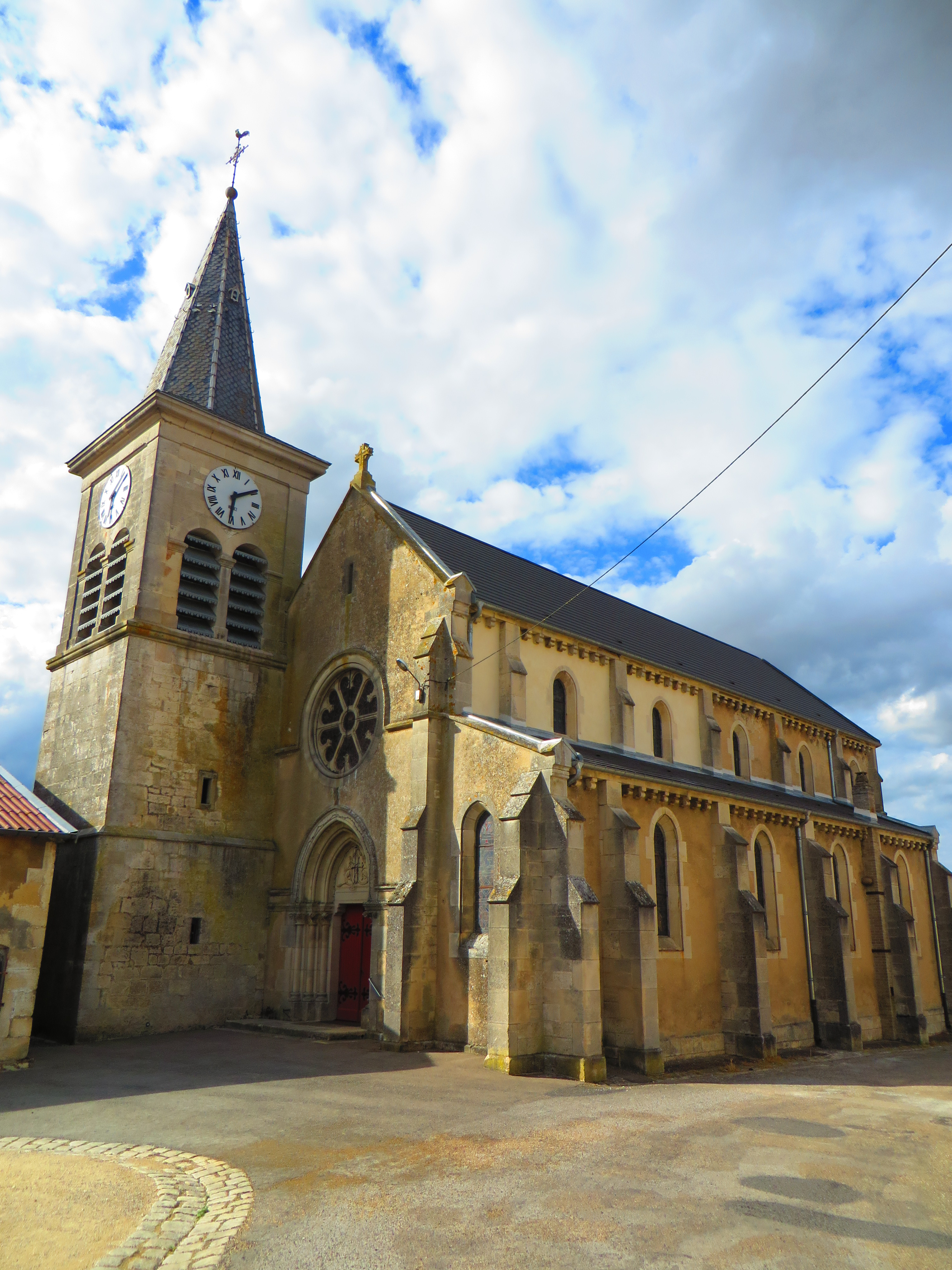
- The church in Woimbey

- Coat of arms
- Location of Woimbey
- Location within France Location within Grand Est
- Coordinates: 48°58′35″N 5°28′05″E
- Country: France
- Region: Grand Est
- Department: Meuse
- Arrondissement: Commercy
- Canton: Dieue-sur-Meuse
- Intercommunality: CC de l'Aire à l'Argonne

Government
  - Mayor (2020–2026): Sylvain Foures
- Area^{1}: 15.3 km^{2} (5.9 sq mi)
- Elevation: 220 m (720 ft)
- Highest elevation: 327 m (1,073 ft)
- Lowest elevation: 210 m (690 ft)
- Population (2023): 133
  - Density: 8.69/km^{2} (22.5/sq mi)
- Time zone: UTC+01:00 (CET)
  - Summer (DST): UTC+02:00 (CEST)
- INSEE/Postal code: 55584 /55300
- ^{1} French Land Register data, which excludes lakes, ponds, glaciers > 1 km^{2} (0.386 sq mi or 247 acres) and river estuaries.

Woimbey is a commune in the Meuse department in Grand Est in north-eastern France.

== Population ==
Historical population
Year	Pop.	±% p.a.
1968	186	—
1975	156	−2.48%
1982	120	−3.68%
1990	120	+0.00%
1999	106	−1.37%
2007	108	+0.23%
2012	115	+1.26%
2017	122	+1.19%
2023	133	+1.45%
Source: INSEE

== See also ==
- Communes of the Meuse department
