= Xivray-et-Marvoisin =

- Commune
- Location of Xivray-et-Marvoisin
- Location within France Location within Grand Est
- Coordinates: 48°51′55″N 5°44′40″E
- Country: France
- Region: Grand Est
- Department: Meuse
- Arrondissement: Commercy
- Canton: Saint-Mihiel
- Intercommunality: Côtes de Meuse-Woëvre

Government
  - Mayor (2020–2026): Jean-Claude Vaucelle
- Area^{1}: 14.45 km^{2} (5.58 sq mi)
- Elevation: 234 m (768 ft)
- Highest elevation: 253 m (830 ft)
- Lowest elevation: 222 m (728 ft)
- Population (2023): 118
  - Density: 8.17/km^{2} (21.2/sq mi)
- Time zone: UTC+01:00 (CET)
  - Summer (DST): UTC+02:00 (CEST)
- INSEE/Postal code: 55586 /55300
- ^{1} French Land Register data, which excludes lakes, ponds, glaciers > 1 km^{2} (0.386 sq mi or 247 acres) and river estuaries.

Xivray-et-Marvoisin is a commune in the Meuse department in Grand Est in north-eastern France.

== Geography ==
The Rupt de Mad forms part of the commune's southern border, then flows northeastward through its eastern part.

== Population ==
Historical population
Year	Pop.	±% p.a.
1968	130	—
1975	115	−1.74%
1982	94	−2.84%
1990	103	+1.15%
1999	108	+0.53%
2007	80	−3.68%
2012	88	+1.92%
2017	99	+2.38%
2023	118	+2.97%
Source: INSEE

== See also ==
- Communes of the Meuse department
- Parc naturel régional de Lorraine
