= Chauvoncourt =

- Commune
- Coat of arms
- Location of Chauvoncourt
- Location within France Location within Grand Est
- Coordinates: 48°54′07″N 5°31′28″E
- Country: France
- Region: Grand Est
- Department: Meuse
- Arrondissement: Commercy
- Canton: Saint-Mihiel
- Intercommunality: Sammiellois

Government
  - Mayor (2020–2026): Jean Pancher
- Area^{1}: 10.04 km^{2} (3.88 sq mi)
- Elevation: 221 m (725 ft)
- Highest elevation: 349 m (1,145 ft)
- Lowest elevation: 214 m (702 ft)
- Population (2023): 430
  - Density: 43/km^{2} (110/sq mi)
- Time zone: UTC+01:00 (CET)
  - Summer (DST): UTC+02:00 (CEST)
- INSEE/Postal code: 55111 /55300
- ^{1} French Land Register data, which excludes lakes, ponds, glaciers > 1 km^{2} (0.386 sq mi or 247 acres) and river estuaries.

Chauvoncourt (French pronunciation: [ʃovɔ̃kuʁ]) is a commune in the Meuse department in Grand Est in north-eastern France.

== See also ==
- Communes of the Meuse department
