= Rouvrois-sur-Meuse =

- Commune
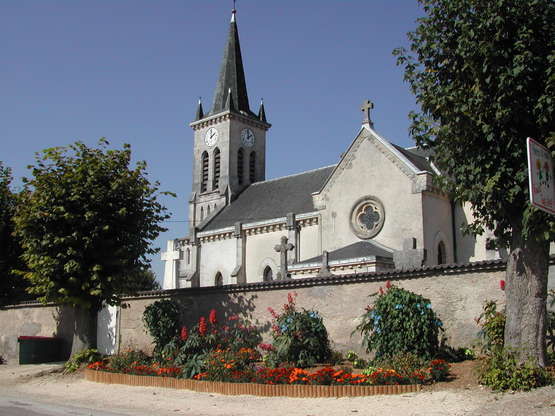
- The church in Rouvrois-sur-Meuse

- Coat of arms
- Location of Rouvrois-sur-Meuse
- Location within France Location within Grand Est
- Coordinates: 48°56′46″N 5°31′07″E
- Country: France
- Region: Grand Est
- Department: Meuse
- Arrondissement: Commercy
- Canton: Saint-Mihiel
- Intercommunality: CC du Sammiellois

Government
  - Mayor (2020–2026): Isabelle Lefort
- Area^{1}: 6.13 km^{2} (2.37 sq mi)
- Elevation: 210 m (690 ft)
- Highest elevation: 291 m (955 ft)
- Lowest elevation: 211 m (692 ft)
- Population (2023): 194
  - Density: 31.6/km^{2} (82.0/sq mi)
- Time zone: UTC+01:00 (CET)
  - Summer (DST): UTC+02:00 (CEST)
- INSEE/Postal code: 55444 /55300
- ^{1} French Land Register data, which excludes lakes, ponds, glaciers > 1 km^{2} (0.386 sq mi or 247 acres) and river estuaries.

Rouvrois-sur-Meuse (French pronunciation: [ʁuvʁwa syʁ møz], literally Rouvrois on Meuse) is a commune in the Meuse department in Grand Est in north-eastern France.

== See also ==
- Communes of the Meuse department
- Parc naturel régional de Lorraine
