= Rambucourt =

- Commune
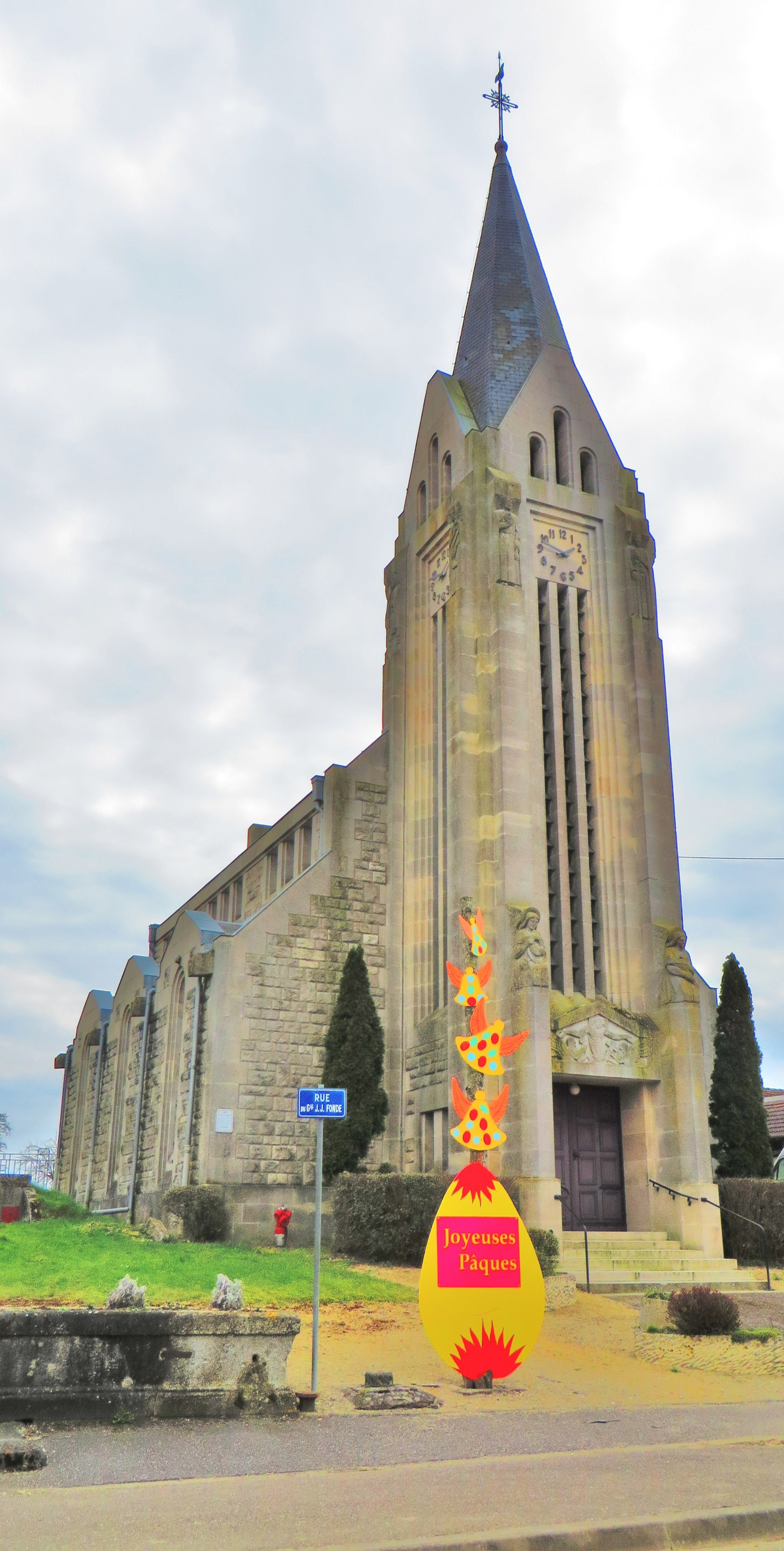
- The church in Rambucourt

- Coat of arms
- Location of Rambucourt
- Location within France Location within Grand Est
- Coordinates: 48°50′41″N 5°45′32″E
- Country: France
- Region: Grand Est
- Department: Meuse
- Arrondissement: Commercy
- Canton: Saint-Mihiel
- Intercommunality: CC Côtes de Meuse Woëvre

Government
  - Mayor (2020–2026): Bernard Carle
- Area^{1}: 14.86 km^{2} (5.74 sq mi)
- Elevation: 257 m (843 ft)
- Highest elevation: 274 m (899 ft)
- Lowest elevation: 224 m (735 ft)
- Population (2023): 194
  - Density: 13.1/km^{2} (33.8/sq mi)
- Time zone: UTC+01:00 (CET)
  - Summer (DST): UTC+02:00 (CEST)
- INSEE/Postal code: 55412 /55300
- ^{1} French Land Register data, which excludes lakes, ponds, glaciers > 1 km^{2} (0.386 sq mi or 247 acres) and river estuaries.

Rambucourt (French pronunciation: [ʁɑ̃bykuʁ]) is a commune in the Meuse department in Grand Est in north-eastern France.

== Geography ==
The Rupt de Mad forms part of the commune's north-western border.

== See also ==
- Communes of the Meuse department
- Parc naturel régional de Lorraine
