= Loupmont =

- Commune
- Coat of arms
- Location of Loupmont
- Location within France Location within Grand Est
- Coordinates: 48°52′17″N 5°40′29″E
- Country: France
- Region: Grand Est
- Department: Meuse
- Arrondissement: Commercy
- Canton: Saint-Mihiel
- Intercommunality: CC Côtes de Meuse Woëvre

Government
  - Mayor (2020–2026): Thierry Godart
- Area^{1}: 10.33 km^{2} (3.99 sq mi)
- Elevation: 260 m (850 ft)
- Highest elevation: 383 m (1,257 ft)
- Lowest elevation: 233 m (764 ft)
- Population (2023): 75
  - Density: 7.3/km^{2} (19/sq mi)
- Time zone: UTC+01:00 (CET)
  - Summer (DST): UTC+02:00 (CEST)
- INSEE/Postal code: 55303 /55300
- ^{1} French Land Register data, which excludes lakes, ponds, glaciers > 1 km^{2} (0.386 sq mi or 247 acres) and river estuaries.

Loupmont (French pronunciation: [lumɔ̃]) is a commune in the Meuse department in Grand Est in north-eastern France.

== See also ==
- Communes of the Meuse department
- Parc naturel régional de Lorraine
