= Les Paroches =

- Commune
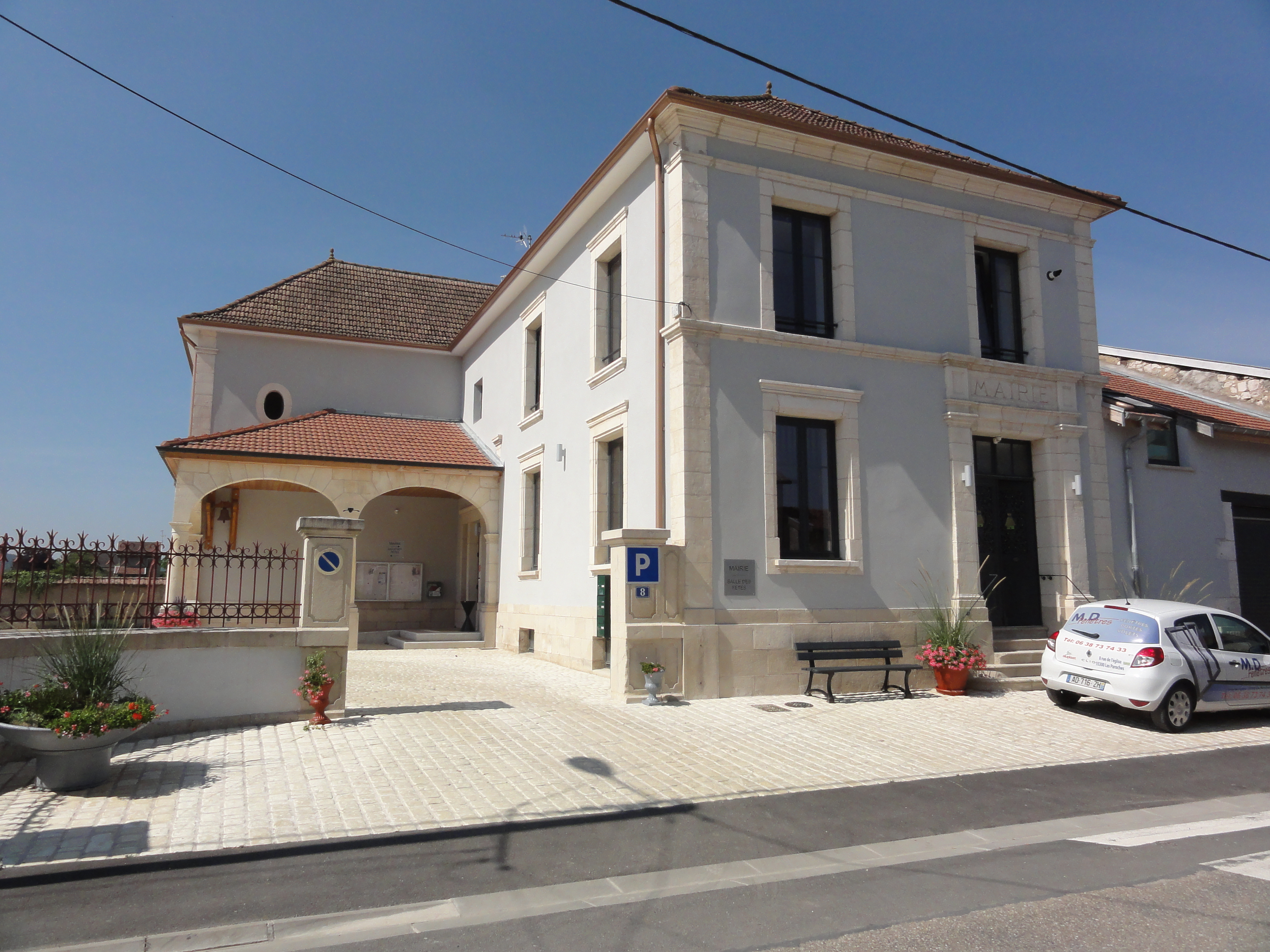
- The town hall in Les Paroches

- Coat of arms
- Location of Les Paroches
- Location within France Location within Grand Est
- Coordinates: 48°54′32″N 5°30′52″E
- Country: France
- Region: Grand Est
- Department: Meuse
- Arrondissement: Commercy
- Canton: Saint-Mihiel
- Intercommunality: Sammiellois

Government
  - Mayor (2020–2026): Alain Martin
- Area^{1}: 10.24 km^{2} (3.95 sq mi)
- Elevation: 214 m (702 ft)
- Highest elevation: 339 m (1,112 ft)
- Lowest elevation: 212 m (696 ft)
- Population (2023): 413
  - Density: 40.3/km^{2} (104/sq mi)
- Time zone: UTC+01:00 (CET)
  - Summer (DST): UTC+02:00 (CEST)
- INSEE/Postal code: 55401 /55300
- ^{1} French Land Register data, which excludes lakes, ponds, glaciers > 1 km^{2} (0.386 sq mi or 247 acres) and river estuaries.

Les Paroches (French pronunciation: [le paʁɔʃ]) is a commune in the Meuse department in Grand Est in north-eastern France.

== See also ==
- Communes of the Meuse department
