= Han-sur-Meuse =

- Commune
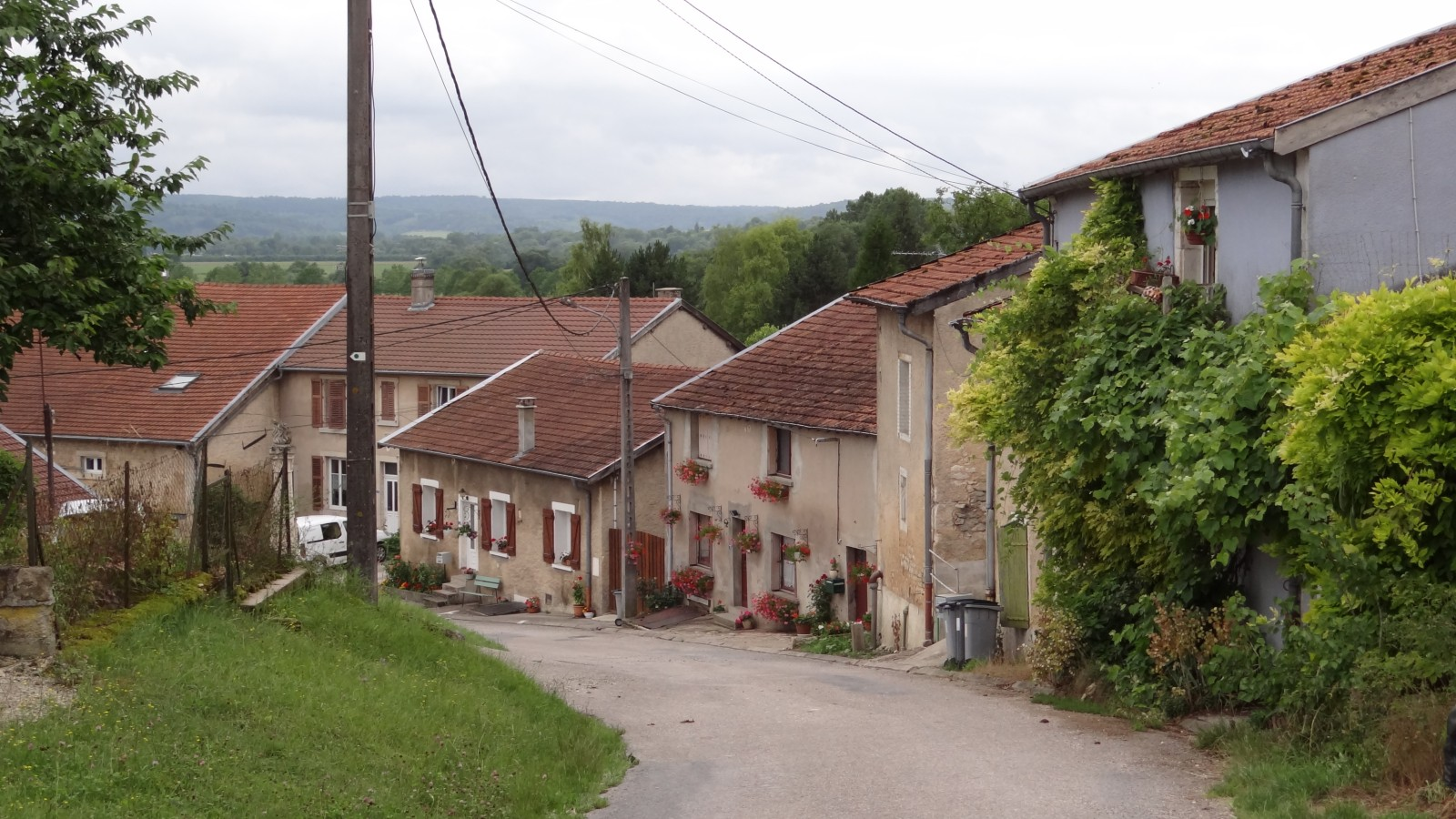
- A view within Ailly-sur-Meuse

- Coat of arms
- Location of Han-sur-Meuse
- Location within France Location within Grand Est
- Coordinates: 48°52′01″N 5°32′23″E
- Country: France
- Region: Grand Est
- Department: Meuse
- Arrondissement: Commercy
- Canton: Saint-Mihiel
- Intercommunality: CC du Sammiellois

Government
  - Mayor (2020–2026): Jean-Pierre Chabousson
- Area^{1}: 17.22 km^{2} (6.65 sq mi)
- Elevation: 220 m (720 ft)
- Highest elevation: 374 m (1,227 ft)
- Lowest elevation: 219 m (719 ft)
- Population (2023): 270
  - Density: 16/km^{2} (41/sq mi)
- Time zone: UTC+01:00 (CET)
  - Summer (DST): UTC+02:00 (CEST)
- INSEE/Postal code: 55229 /55300
- ^{1} French Land Register data, which excludes lakes, ponds, glaciers > 1 km^{2} (0.386 sq mi or 247 acres) and river estuaries.

Han-sur-Meuse (French pronunciation: [ɑ̃ syʁ møz], Han on Meuse) is a commune in the Meuse department in Grand Est in north-eastern France. In January 1973, it absorbed the former communes Ailly-sur-Meuse and Brasseitte.

== See also ==
- Communes of the Meuse department
- Parc naturel régional de Lorraine
