= Lacroix-sur-Meuse =

- Commune
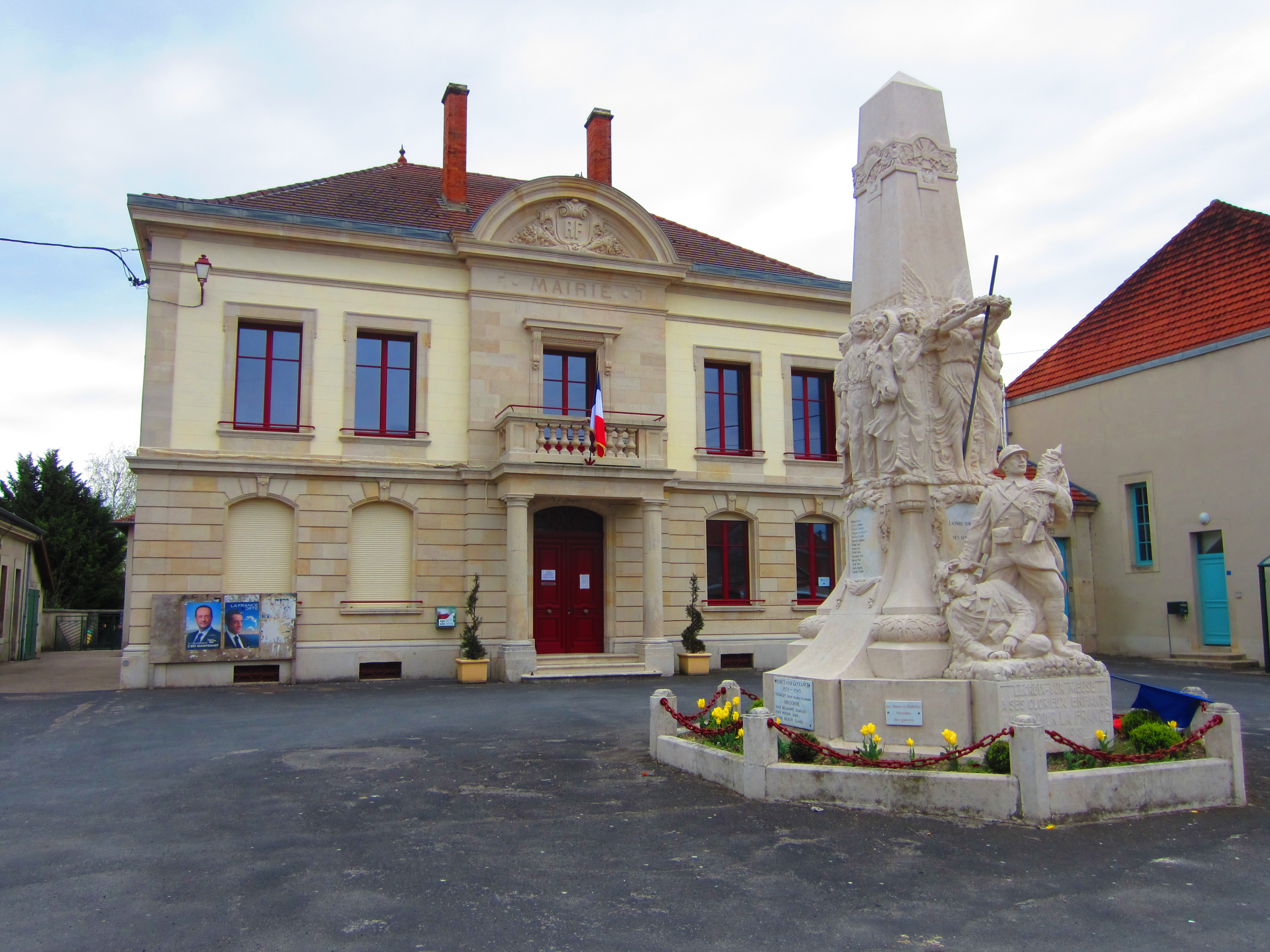
- The town hall in Lacroix-sur-Meuse

- Coat of arms
- Location of Lacroix-sur-Meuse
- Location within France Location within Grand Est
- Coordinates: 48°58′28″N 5°30′44″E
- Country: France
- Region: Grand Est
- Department: Meuse
- Arrondissement: Commercy
- Canton: Saint-Mihiel
- Intercommunality: Sammiellois

Government
  - Mayor (2020–2026): Régis Mesot
- Area^{1}: 21.15 km^{2} (8.17 sq mi)
- Elevation: 215 m (705 ft)
- Highest elevation: 359 m (1,178 ft)
- Lowest elevation: 210 m (690 ft)
- Population (2023): 638
  - Density: 30.2/km^{2} (78.1/sq mi)
- Time zone: UTC+01:00 (CET)
  - Summer (DST): UTC+02:00 (CEST)
- INSEE/Postal code: 55268 /55300
- ^{1} French Land Register data, which excludes lakes, ponds, glaciers > 1 km^{2} (0.386 sq mi or 247 acres) and river estuaries.

Lacroix-sur-Meuse (French pronunciation: [la.kʁwa.syʁ.møz]) is a commune in the Meuse department in Grand Est in north-eastern France.

== See also ==
- Communes of the Meuse department
- Parc naturel régional de Lorraine
