= Bouconville-sur-Madt =

- Commune
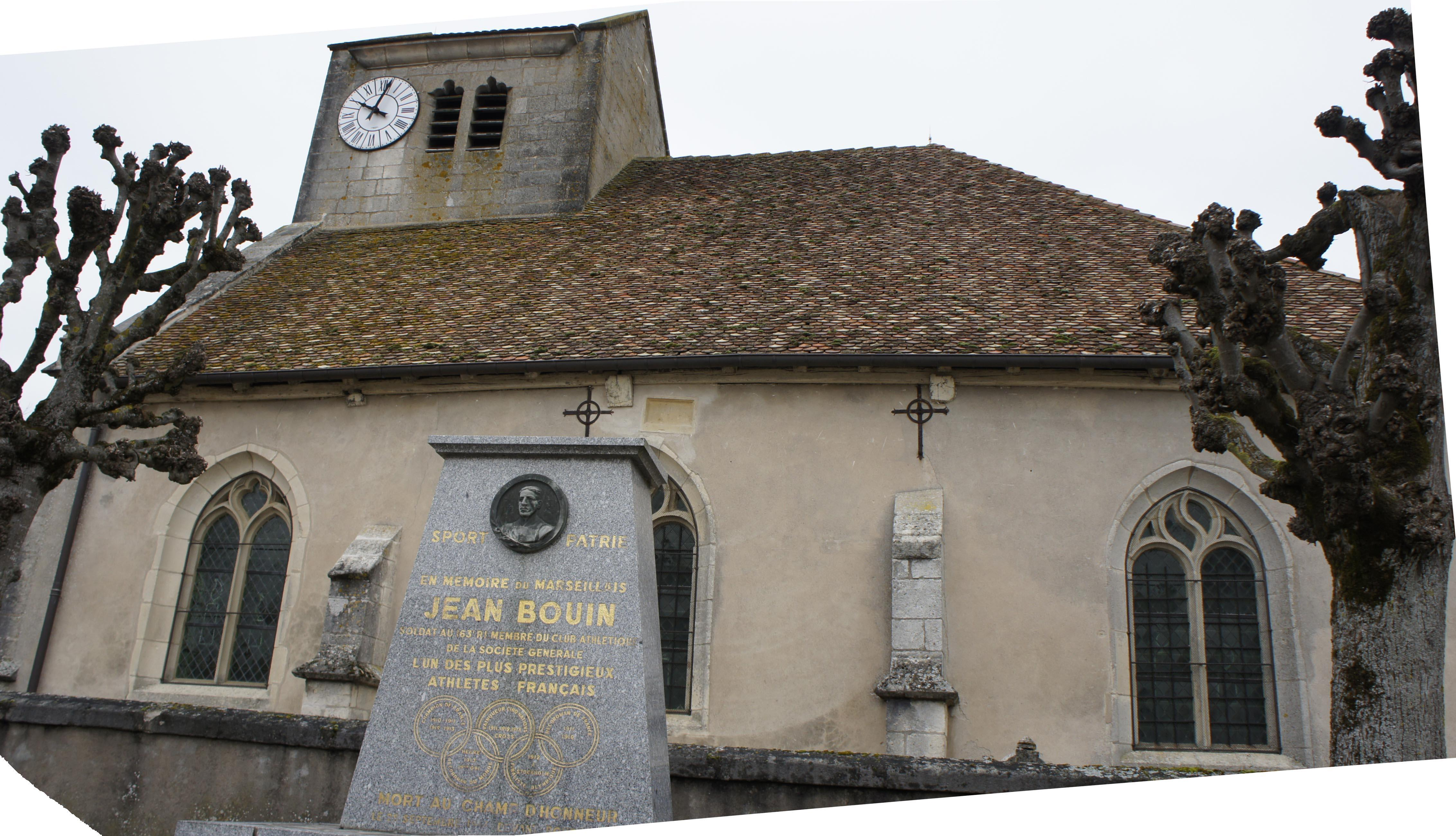
- The church in Bouconville-sur-Madt

- Coat of arms
- Location of Bouconville-sur-Madt
- Location within France Location within Grand Est
- Coordinates: 48°50′36″N 5°43′07″E
- Country: France
- Region: Grand Est
- Department: Meuse
- Arrondissement: Commercy
- Canton: Saint-Mihiel

Government
  - Mayor (2020–2026): Denis Rocquin
- Area^{1}: 6.98 km^{2} (2.69 sq mi)
- Elevation: 220 m (720 ft)
- Highest elevation: 246 m (807 ft)
- Lowest elevation: 225 m (738 ft)
- Population (2023): 99
  - Density: 14/km^{2} (37/sq mi)
- Time zone: UTC+01:00 (CET)
  - Summer (DST): UTC+02:00 (CEST)
- INSEE/Postal code: 55062 /55300
- ^{1} French Land Register data, which excludes lakes, ponds, glaciers > 1 km^{2} (0.386 sq mi or 247 acres) and river estuaries.

Bouconville-sur-Madt is a commune in the Meuse department in Grand Est in northeastern France.

== Geography ==
The village lies on the left bank of the Rupt de Mad, which flows northeast through the eastern part of the commune.

== Population ==
Historical population
Year	Pop.	±% p.a.
1968	95	—
1975	86	−1.41%
1982	83	−0.51%
1990	86	+0.44%
1999	84	−0.26%
2007	101	+2.33%
2012	108	+1.35%
2017	111	+0.55%
2023	99	−1.89%
Source: INSEE

== See also ==
- Communes of the Meuse department
- Parc naturel régional de Lorraine
