= Maizey =

- Commune
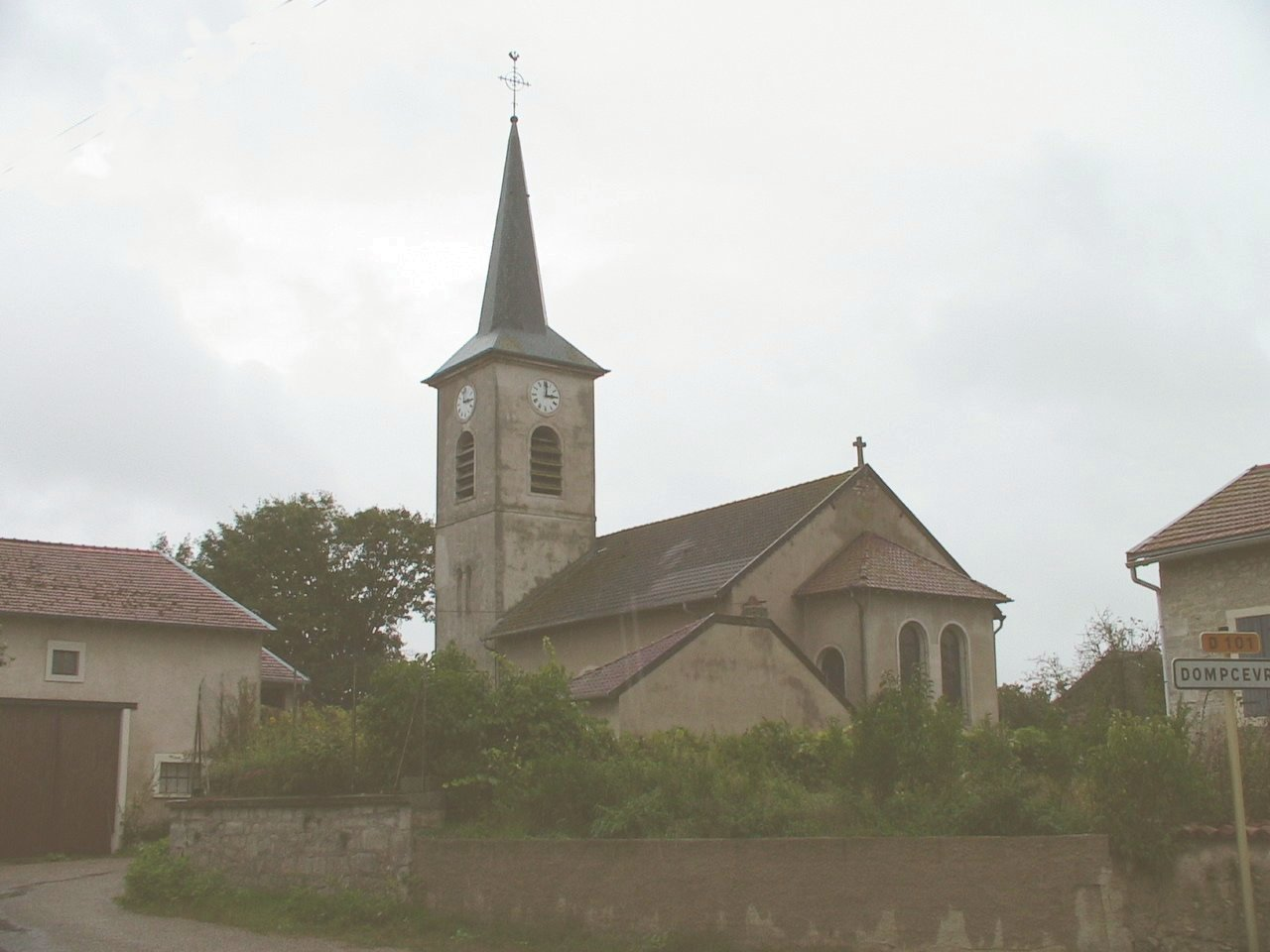
- The church in Maizey

- Coat of arms
- Location of Maizey
- Location within France Location within Grand Est
- Coordinates: 48°55′31″N 5°30′45″E
- Country: France
- Region: Grand Est
- Department: Meuse
- Arrondissement: Commercy
- Canton: Saint-Mihiel
- Intercommunality: CC Sammiellois

Government
  - Mayor (2020–2026): Dominique Didelot
- Area^{1}: 14.91 km^{2} (5.76 sq mi)
- Elevation: 220 m (720 ft)
- Highest elevation: 393 m (1,289 ft)
- Lowest elevation: 212 m (696 ft)
- Population (2023): 155
  - Density: 10.4/km^{2} (26.9/sq mi)
- Time zone: UTC+01:00 (CET)
  - Summer (DST): UTC+02:00 (CEST)
- INSEE/Postal code: 55312 /55300
- ^{1} French Land Register data, which excludes lakes, ponds, glaciers > 1 km^{2} (0.386 sq mi or 247 acres) and river estuaries.

Maizey (French pronunciation: [mɛzɛ]) is a commune in the Meuse department in Grand Est in north-eastern France.

== See also ==
- Communes of the Meuse department
