= Épiez-sur-Meuse =

- Commune
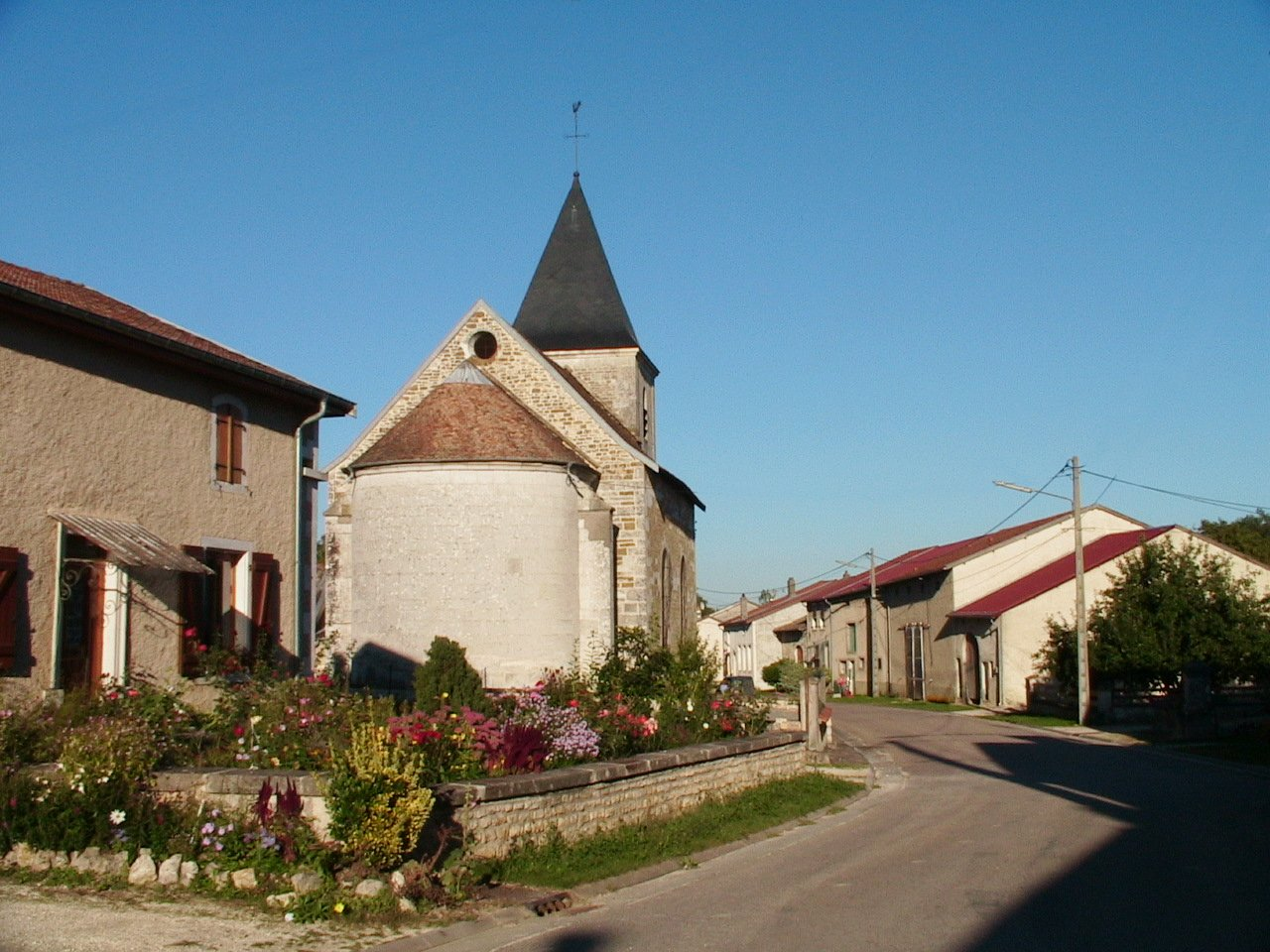
- Church neighborhood

- Coat of arms
- Location of Épiez-sur-Meuse
- Location within France Location within Grand Est
- Coordinates: 48°32′45″N 5°38′26″E
- Country: France
- Region: Grand Est
- Department: Meuse
- Arrondissement: Commercy
- Canton: Vaucouleurs

Government
  - Mayor (2020–2026): Fabienne Antoine
- Area^{1}: 8.19 km^{2} (3.16 sq mi)
- Elevation: 300 m (980 ft)
- Highest elevation: 410 m (1,350 ft)
- Lowest elevation: 274 m (899 ft)
- Population (2023): 37
  - Density: 4.5/km^{2} (12/sq mi)
- Time zone: UTC+01:00 (CET)
  - Summer (DST): UTC+02:00 (CEST)
- INSEE/Postal code: 55173 /55140
- ^{1} French Land Register data, which excludes lakes, ponds, glaciers > 1 km^{2} (0.386 sq mi or 247 acres) and river estuaries.

Épiez-sur-Meuse (French pronunciation: [epje syʁ møz], literally Épiez on Meuse) is a commune in the Meuse department in Grand Est in north-eastern France. It is approximately 16 miles (26 km) south-west of Toul.

== See also ==
- Communes of the Meuse department
