= Ranzières =

- Commune
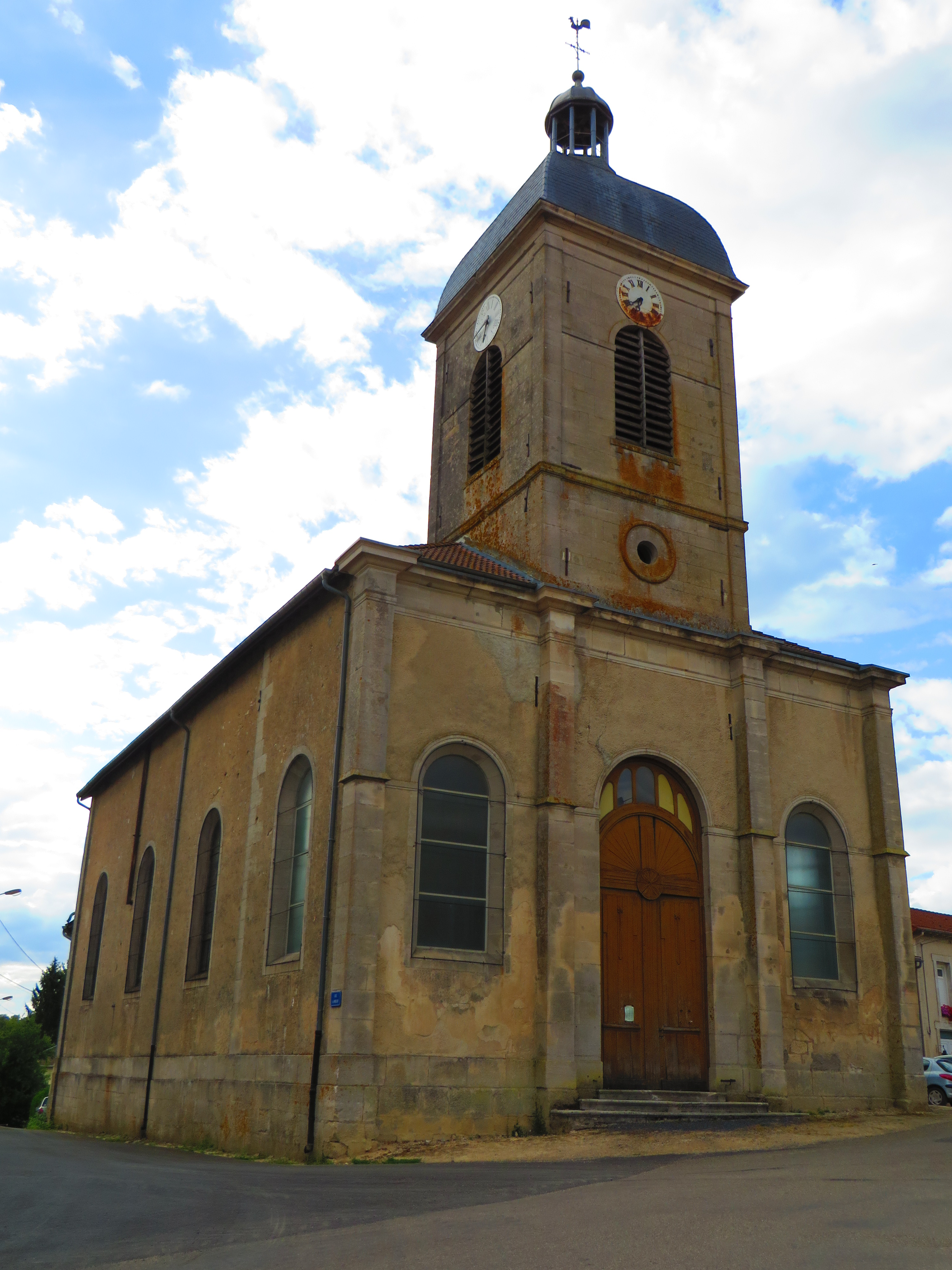
- The church in Ranzières

- Coat of arms
- Location of Ranzières
- Location within France Location within Grand Est
- Coordinates: 49°01′10″N 5°29′36″E
- Country: France
- Region: Grand Est
- Department: Meuse
- Arrondissement: Commercy
- Canton: Saint-Mihiel
- Intercommunality: CC du Sammiellois

Government
  - Mayor (2020–2026): Marc Camus
- Area^{1}: 14.09 km^{2} (5.44 sq mi)
- Elevation: 210 m (690 ft)
- Highest elevation: 360 m (1,180 ft)
- Lowest elevation: 215 m (705 ft)
- Population (2023): 87
  - Density: 6.2/km^{2} (16/sq mi)
- Time zone: UTC+01:00 (CET)
  - Summer (DST): UTC+02:00 (CEST)
- INSEE/Postal code: 55415 /55300
- ^{1} French Land Register data, which excludes lakes, ponds, glaciers > 1 km^{2} (0.386 sq mi or 247 acres) and river estuaries.

Ranzières (French pronunciation: [ʁɑ̃zjɛʁ]) is a commune in the Meuse department in Grand Est in north-eastern France.

== See also ==
- Communes of the Meuse department
- Parc naturel régional de Lorraine
