= Bislée =

- Commune
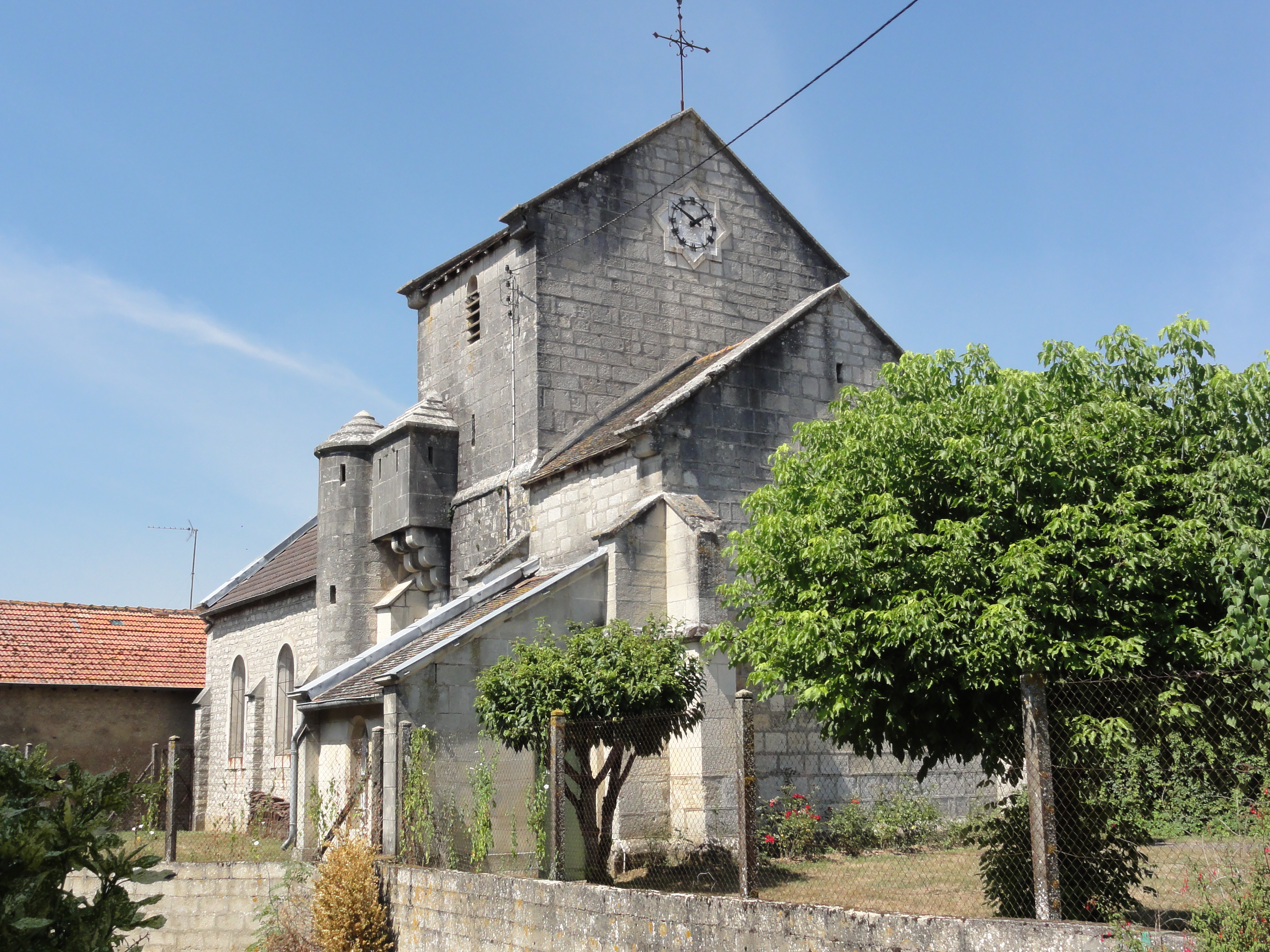
- The church in Bislée

- Coat of arms
- Location of Bislée
- Location within France Location within Grand Est
- Coordinates: 48°52′10″N 5°29′43″E
- Country: France
- Region: Grand Est
- Department: Meuse
- Arrondissement: Commercy
- Canton: Saint-Mihiel
- Intercommunality: Sammiellois

Government
  - Mayor (2020–2026): Aurore Pannetier
- Area^{1}: 4.96 km^{2} (1.92 sq mi)
- Elevation: 220 m (720 ft)
- Highest elevation: 311 m (1,020 ft)
- Lowest elevation: 217 m (712 ft)
- Population (2023): 63
  - Density: 13/km^{2} (33/sq mi)
- Time zone: UTC+01:00 (CET)
  - Summer (DST): UTC+02:00 (CEST)
- INSEE/Postal code: 55054 /55300
- ^{1} French Land Register data, which excludes lakes, ponds, glaciers > 1 km^{2} (0.386 sq mi or 247 acres) and river estuaries.

Bislée (French pronunciation: [bile]) is a commune in the Meuse department in Grand Est in northeastern France.

== Population ==
Historical population
Year	Pop.	±% p.a.
1968	83	—
1975	89	+1.00%
1982	77	−2.05%
1990	79	+0.32%
1999	68	−1.65%
2007	63	−0.95%
2012	60	−0.97%
2017	61	+0.33%
2023	63	+0.54%
Source: INSEE

== See also ==
- Communes of the Meuse department
