= Richecourt =

- Commune
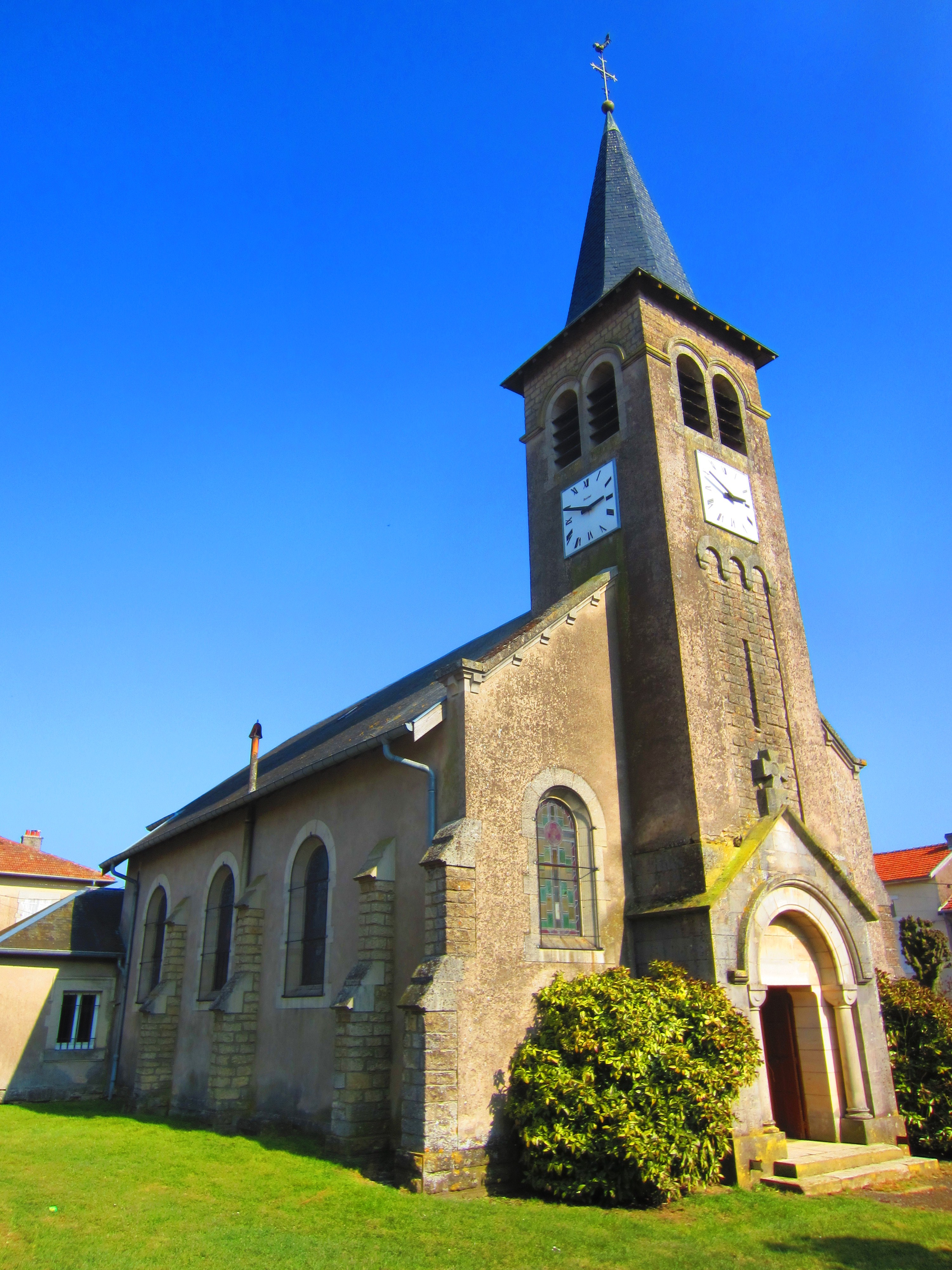
- The church in Richecourt

- Coat of arms
- Location of Richecourt
- Location within France Location within Grand Est
- Coordinates: 48°52′50″N 5°45′43″E
- Country: France
- Region: Grand Est
- Department: Meuse
- Arrondissement: Commercy
- Canton: Saint-Mihiel
- Intercommunality: CC Côtes de Meuse Woëvre

Government
  - Mayor (2020–2026): Francine Zins
- Area^{1}: 6.23 km^{2} (2.41 sq mi)
- Elevation: 239 m (784 ft)
- Highest elevation: 243 m (797 ft)
- Lowest elevation: 223 m (732 ft)
- Population (2023): 57
  - Density: 9.1/km^{2} (24/sq mi)
- Time zone: UTC+01:00 (CET)
  - Summer (DST): UTC+02:00 (CEST)
- INSEE/Postal code: 55431 /55300
- ^{1} French Land Register data, which excludes lakes, ponds, glaciers > 1 km^{2} (0.386 sq mi or 247 acres) and river estuaries.

World War I damage at Richecourt

Richecourt (French pronunciation: [ʁiʃkuʁ]) is a commune in the Meuse department in Grand Est in north-eastern France.

== Geography ==
The village lies on the left bank of the Rupt de Mad, which flows northeastward through the south-eastern part of the commune.

== See also ==
- Communes of the Meuse department
- Parc naturel régional de Lorraine
