= Troyon =

- Commune
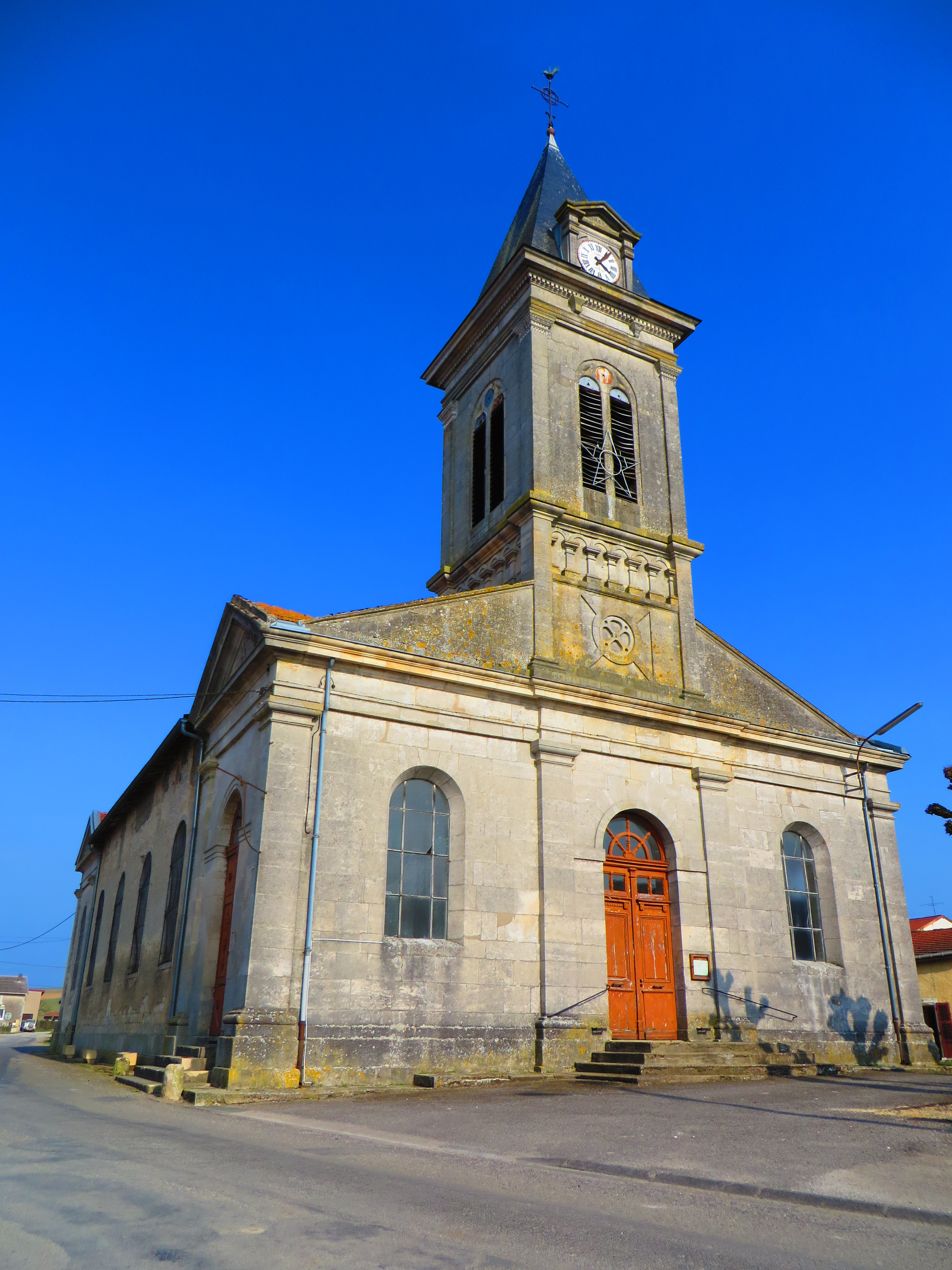
- The church in Troyon

- Coat of arms
- Location of Troyon
- Location within France Location within Grand Est
- Coordinates: 49°00′13″N 5°27′54″E
- Country: France
- Region: Grand Est
- Department: Meuse
- Arrondissement: Commercy
- Canton: Saint-Mihiel
- Intercommunality: CC du Sammiellois

Government
  - Mayor (2020–2026): Pascal Pichavant
- Area^{1}: 13.07 km^{2} (5.05 sq mi)
- Elevation: 209 m (686 ft)
- Highest elevation: 319 m (1,047 ft)
- Lowest elevation: 206 m (676 ft)
- Population (2023): 230
  - Density: 18/km^{2} (46/sq mi)
- Time zone: UTC+01:00 (CET)
  - Summer (DST): UTC+02:00 (CEST)
- INSEE/Postal code: 55521 /55300
- ^{1} French Land Register data, which excludes lakes, ponds, glaciers > 1 km^{2} (0.386 sq mi or 247 acres) and river estuaries.

Troyon (French pronunciation: [tʁwajɔ̃]) is a commune in the Meuse department in Grand Est in north-eastern France.

== See also ==
- Communes of the Meuse department
- Parc naturel régional de Lorraine
