= Longchamps-sur-Aire =

- Commune
- Coat of arms
- Location of Longchamps-sur-Aire
- Location within France Location within Grand Est
- Coordinates: 48°54′37″N 5°18′26″E
- Country: France
- Region: Grand Est
- Department: Meuse
- Arrondissement: Commercy
- Canton: Dieue-sur-Meuse
- Intercommunality: CC de l'Aire à l'Argonne

Government
  - Mayor (2020–2026): Séverine Macinot
- Area^{1}: 15.68 km^{2} (6.05 sq mi)
- Elevation: 247 m (810 ft)
- Highest elevation: 346 m (1,135 ft)
- Lowest elevation: 238 m (781 ft)
- Population (2023): 121
  - Density: 7.72/km^{2} (20.0/sq mi)
- Time zone: UTC+01:00 (CET)
  - Summer (DST): UTC+02:00 (CEST)
- INSEE/Postal code: 55301 /55260
- ^{1} French Land Register data, which excludes lakes, ponds, glaciers > 1 km^{2} (0.386 sq mi or 247 acres) and river estuaries.

Longchamps-sur-Aire (French pronunciation: [lɔ̃ʃɑ̃ syʁ ɛːʁ]; literally "Longfields on Aire") is a commune in the Meuse department in Grand Est in north-eastern France.

== See also ==
- Communes of the Meuse department
