= Varnéville =

- Commune
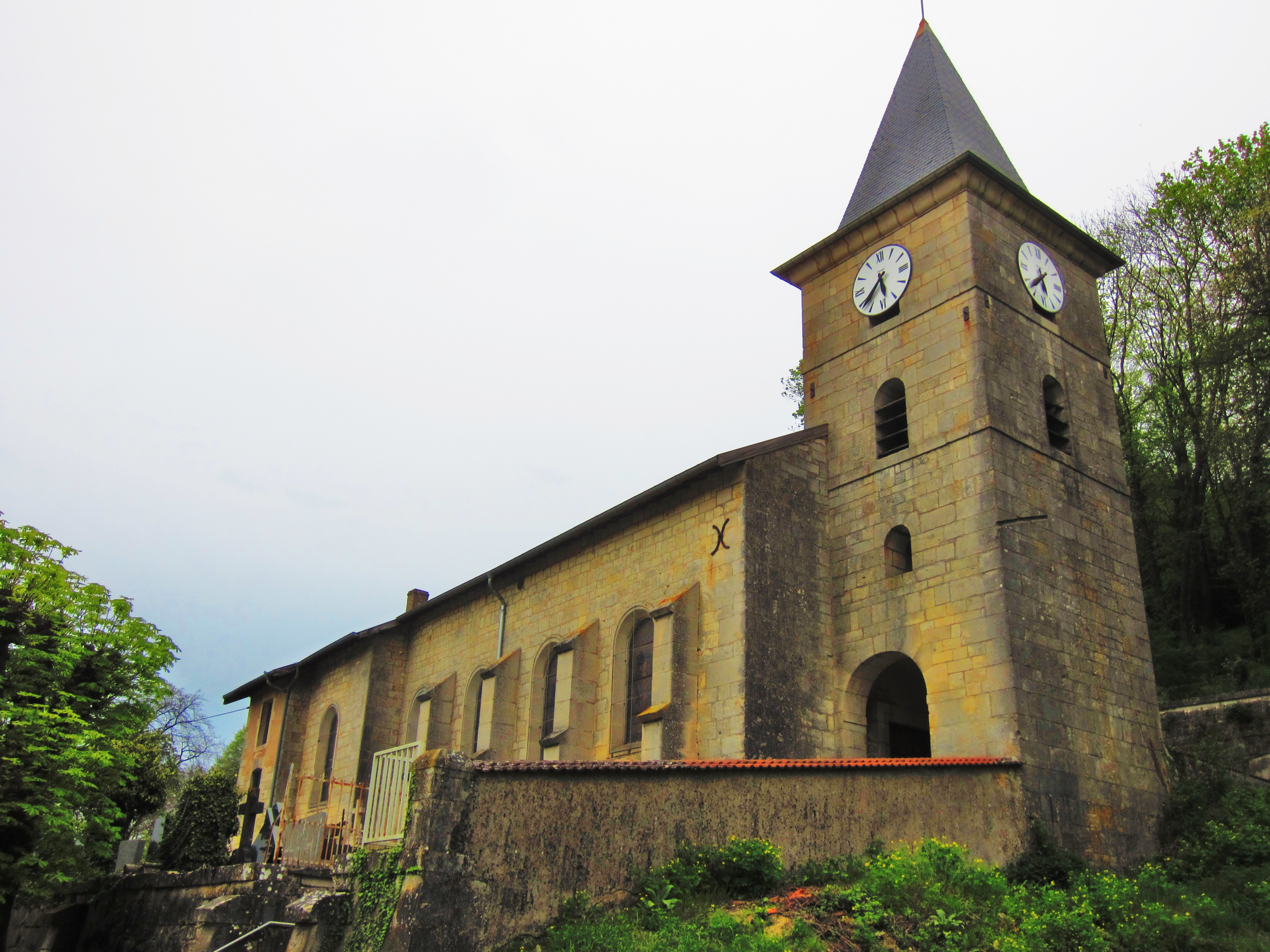
- The church in Varnéville

- Coat of arms
- Location of Varnéville
- Location within France Location within Grand Est
- Coordinates: 48°52′21″N 5°39′22″E
- Country: France
- Region: Grand Est
- Department: Meuse
- Arrondissement: Commercy
- Canton: Saint-Mihiel
- Intercommunality: CC Côtes de Meuse Woëvre

Government
  - Mayor (2020–2026): Bernard Reuter
- Area^{1}: 6.44 km^{2} (2.49 sq mi)
- Elevation: 270 m (890 ft)
- Highest elevation: 382 m (1,253 ft)
- Lowest elevation: 235 m (771 ft)
- Population (2023): 49
  - Density: 7.6/km^{2} (20/sq mi)
- Time zone: UTC+01:00 (CET)
  - Summer (DST): UTC+02:00 (CEST)
- INSEE/Postal code: 55528 /55300
- ^{1} French Land Register data, which excludes lakes, ponds, glaciers > 1 km^{2} (0.386 sq mi or 247 acres) and river estuaries.

Varnéville (French pronunciation: [vaʁnevil]) is a commune in the Meuse department in Grand Est in north-eastern France.

== See also ==
- Communes of the Meuse department
- Parc naturel régional de Lorraine
