= Seuzey =

- Commune
- Coat of arms
- Location of Seuzey
- Location within France Location within Grand Est
- Coordinates: 48°59′14″N 5°33′32″E
- Country: France
- Region: Grand Est
- Department: Meuse
- Arrondissement: Commercy
- Canton: Saint-Mihiel
- Intercommunality: Sammiellois

Government
  - Mayor (2020–2026): Michel Decheppe
- Area^{1}: 4.61 km^{2} (1.78 sq mi)
- Elevation: 261 m (856 ft)
- Highest elevation: 340 m (1,120 ft)
- Lowest elevation: 234 m (768 ft)
- Population (2023): 83
  - Density: 18/km^{2} (47/sq mi)
- Time zone: UTC+01:00 (CET)
  - Summer (DST): UTC+02:00 (CEST)
- INSEE/Postal code: 55487 /55300
- ^{1} French Land Register data, which excludes lakes, ponds, glaciers > 1 km^{2} (0.386 sq mi or 247 acres) and river estuaries.

Seuzey (French pronunciation: [søzɛ]) is a commune in the Meuse department in Grand Est in north-eastern France.

== See also ==
- Communes of the Meuse department
- Parc naturel régional de Lorraine
