= Chaillon =

Commune in Meuse, Grand Est, France

- Commune
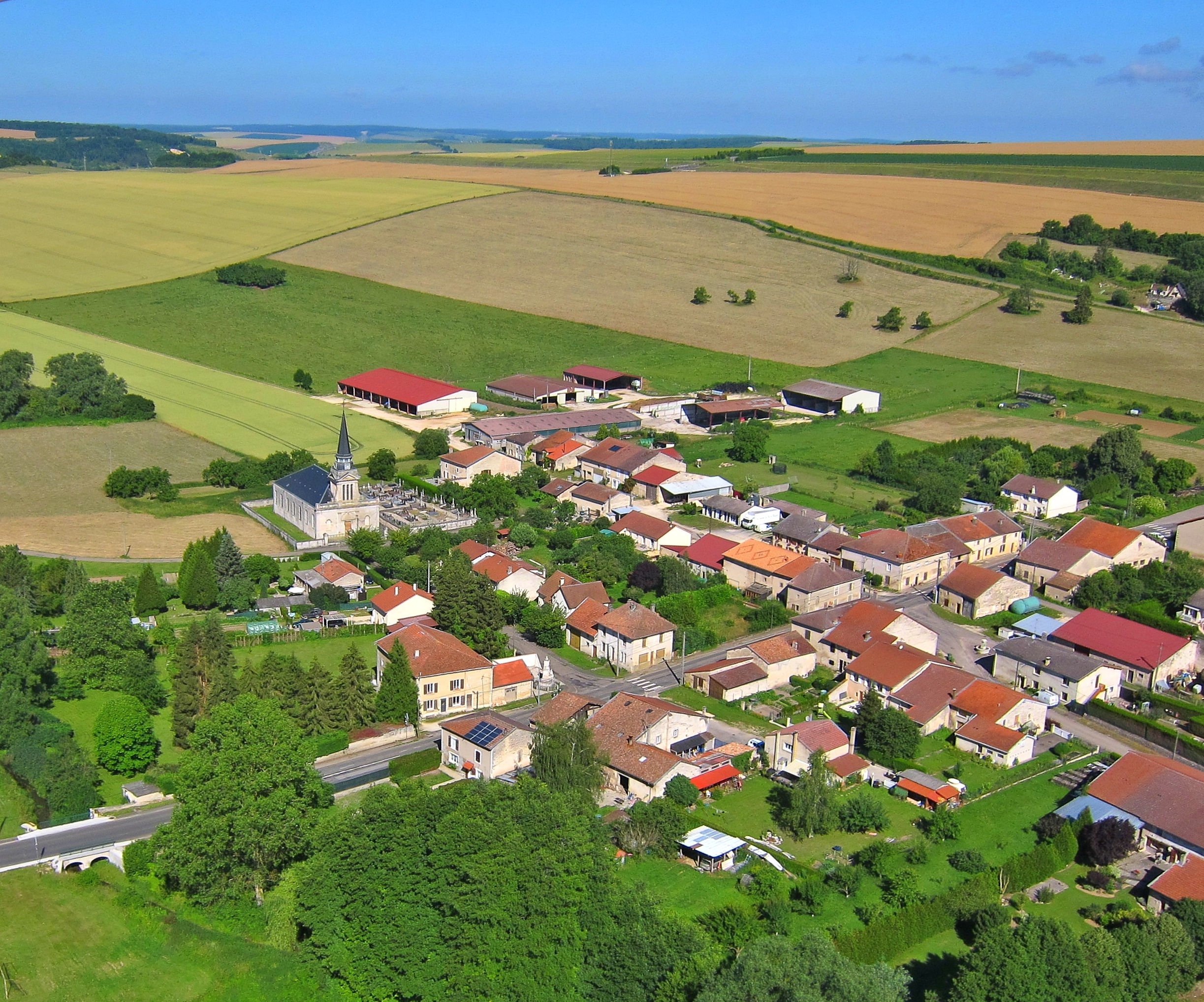
- A general view of Chaillon
- Location of Chaillon
- Location within France Location within Grand Est
- Coordinates: 48°56′53″N 5°38′26″E
- Country: France
- Region: Grand Est
- Department: Meuse
- Arrondissement: Commercy
- Canton: Saint-Mihiel
- Intercommunality: Côtes de Meuse - Woëvre

Government
  - Mayor (2020–2026): Stéphane Mettavant
- Area^{1}: 11.54 km^{2} (4.46 sq mi)
- Elevation: 262 m (860 ft)
- Highest elevation: 393 m (1,289 ft)
- Lowest elevation: 239 m (784 ft)
- Population (2023): 110
  - Density: 9.5/km^{2} (25/sq mi)
- Time zone: UTC+01:00 (CET)
  - Summer (DST): UTC+02:00 (CEST)
- INSEE/Postal code: 55096 /55210
- ^{1} French Land Register data, which excludes lakes, ponds, glaciers > 1 km^{2} (0.386 sq mi or 247 acres) and river estuaries.

Chaillon (French pronunciation: [ʃajɔ̃]) is a commune in the Meuse department in Grand Est in north-eastern France.

== See also ==
- Communes of the Meuse department
- Parc naturel régional de Lorraine
