= Buxières-sous-les-Côtes =

- Commune
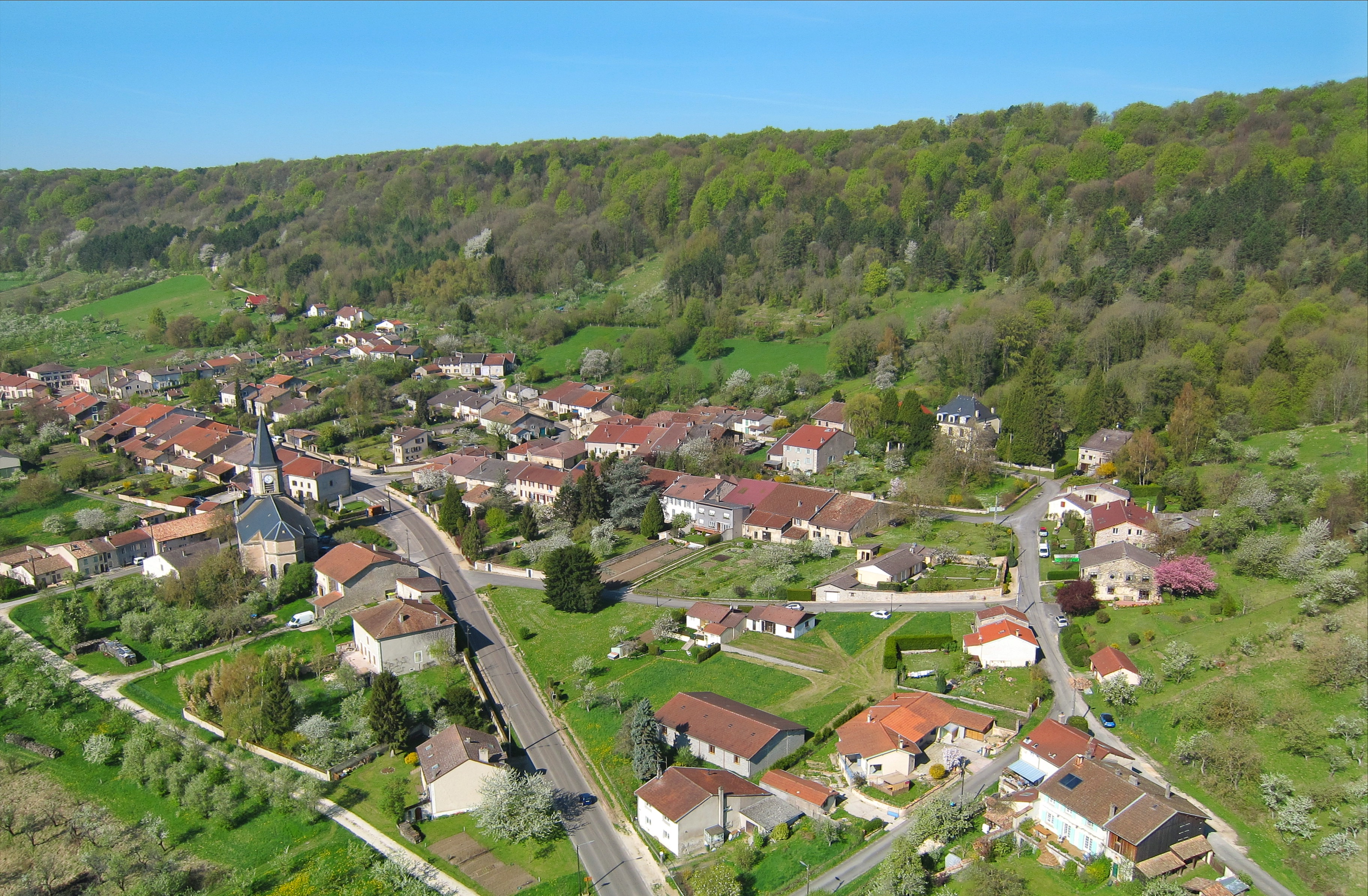
- A general view of Buxières-sous-les-Côtes

- Coat of arms
- Location of Buxières-sous-les-Côtes
- Location within France Location within Grand Est
- Coordinates: 48°54′59″N 5°40′21″E
- Country: France
- Region: Grand Est
- Department: Meuse
- Arrondissement: Commercy
- Canton: Saint-Mihiel
- Intercommunality: Côtes de Meuse Woëvre

Government
  - Mayor (2020–2026): Odile Beirens
- Area^{1}: 26.72 km^{2} (10.32 sq mi)
- Elevation: 275 m (902 ft)
- Highest elevation: 398 m (1,306 ft)
- Lowest elevation: 226 m (741 ft)
- Population (2023): 264
  - Density: 9.88/km^{2} (25.6/sq mi)
- Time zone: UTC+01:00 (CET)
  - Summer (DST): UTC+02:00 (CEST)
- INSEE/Postal code: 55093 /55300
- ^{1} French Land Register data, which excludes lakes, ponds, glaciers > 1 km^{2} (0.386 sq mi or 247 acres) and river estuaries.

Buxières-sous-les-Côtes (French pronunciation: [byksjɛʁ su le kot], literally Buxières under the Slopes) is a commune in the Meuse department in Grand Est in northeastern France. In January 1973, it absorbed the former communes Woinville and Buxerulles.

== Population ==
Historical population
Year	Pop.	±% p.a.
1968	316	—
1975	282	−1.61%
1982	280	−0.10%
1990	276	−0.18%
1999	277	+0.04%
2007	273	−0.18%
2012	277	+0.29%
2017	287	+0.71%
2023	264	−1.38%
Source: INSEE

== See also ==
- Communes of the Meuse department
