= Beney-en-Woëvre =

- Commune
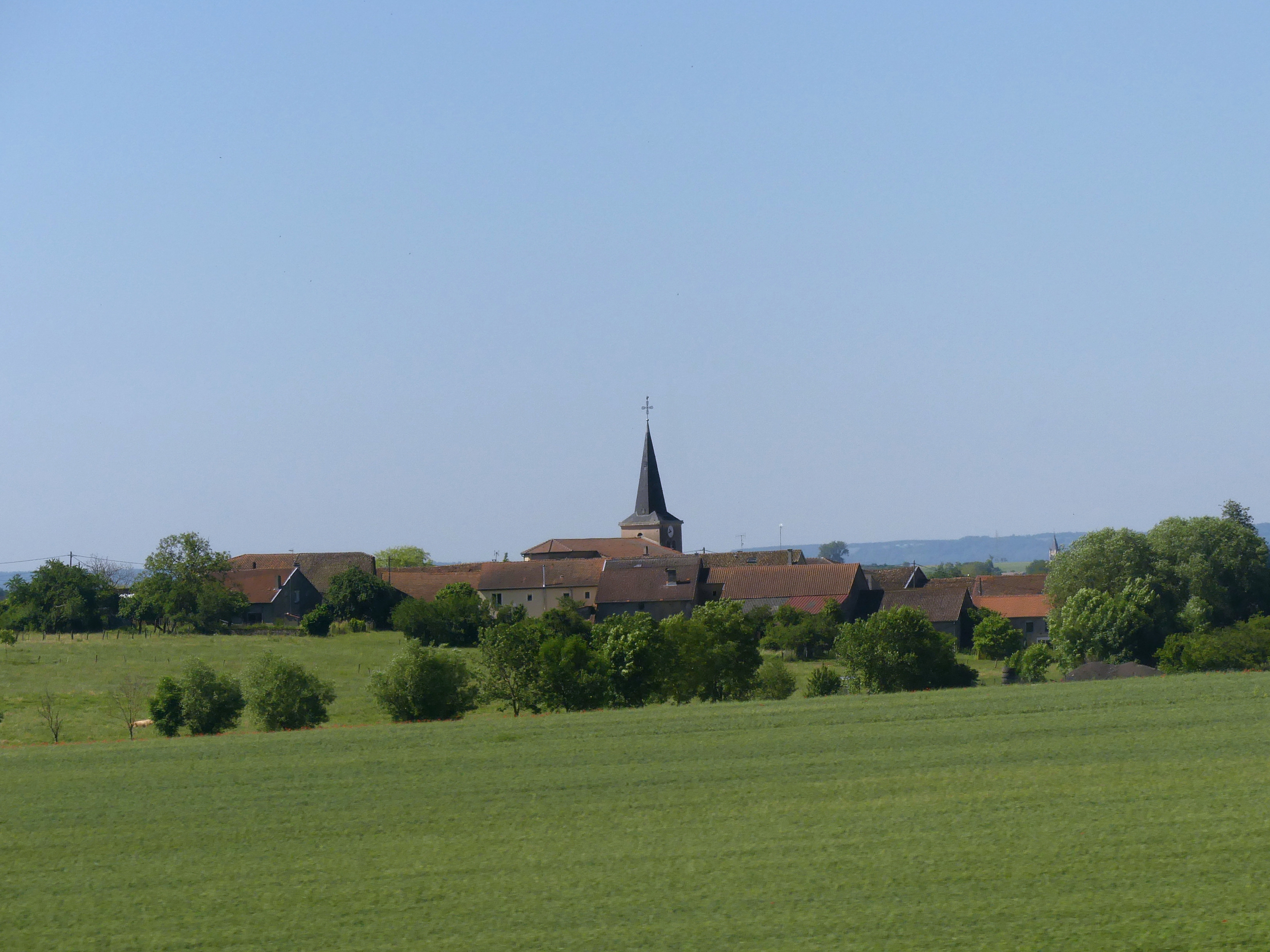
- A general view of Beney-en-Woëvre
- Location of Beney-en-Woëvre
- Location within France Location within Grand Est
- Coordinates: 48°57′45″N 5°49′35″E
- Country: France
- Region: Grand Est
- Department: Meuse
- Arrondissement: Commercy
- Canton: Saint-Mihiel

Government
  - Mayor (2020–2026): Daniel Bernard
- Area^{1}: 17.2 km^{2} (6.6 sq mi)
- Elevation: 233 m (764 ft)
- Highest elevation: 267 m (876 ft)
- Lowest elevation: 218 m (715 ft)
- Population (2023): 136
  - Density: 7.91/km^{2} (20.5/sq mi)
- Time zone: UTC+01:00 (CET)
  - Summer (DST): UTC+02:00 (CEST)
- INSEE/Postal code: 55046 /55210
- ^{1} French Land Register data, which excludes lakes, ponds, glaciers > 1 km^{2} (0.386 sq mi or 247 acres) and river estuaries.

Beney-en-Woëvre (French pronunciation: [bənɛ ɑ̃ wavʁ]) is a commune in the Meuse department in the Grand Est region in northeastern France.

== Population ==
Historical population
Year	Pop.	±% p.a.
1968	173	—
1975	144	−2.59%
1982	120	−2.57%
1990	119	−0.10%
1999	133	+1.24%
2007	152	+1.68%
2012	153	+0.13%
2017	131	−3.06%
2023	136	+0.63%
Source: INSEE

== See also ==
- Communes of the Meuse department
- Parc naturel régional de Lorraine
