= Saint-Maurice-sous-les-Côtes =

- Commune
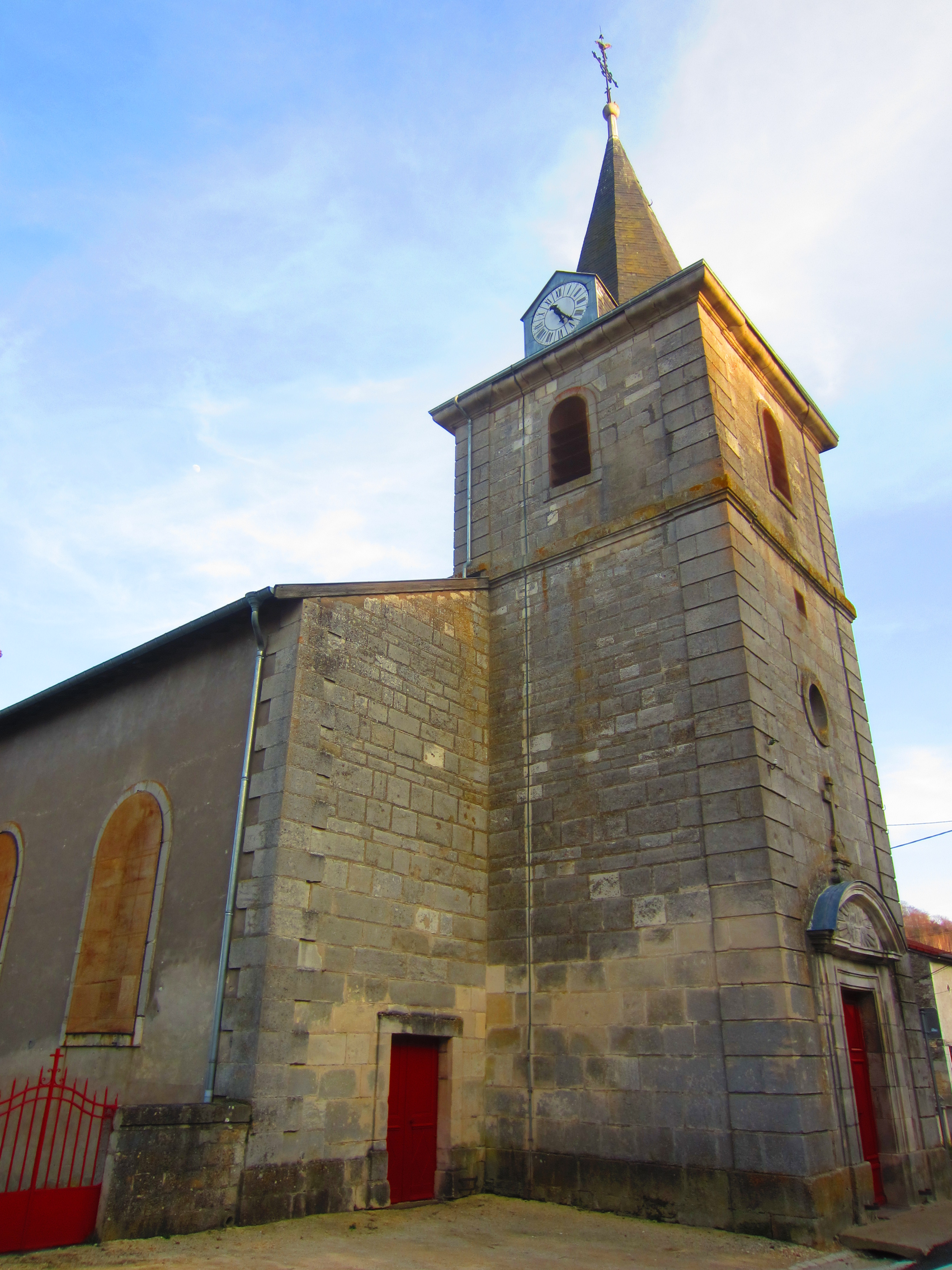
- The church in Saint-Maurice-sous-les-Côtes
- Location of Saint-Maurice-sous-les-Côtes
- Location within France Location within Grand Est
- Coordinates: 49°00′58″N 5°40′45″E
- Country: France
- Region: Grand Est
- Department: Meuse
- Arrondissement: Commercy
- Canton: Saint-Mihiel
- Intercommunality: Côtes de Meuse Woëvre

Government
  - Mayor (2020–2026): Gérard Couly
- Area^{1}: 9.3 km^{2} (3.6 sq mi)
- Elevation: 261 m (856 ft)
- Highest elevation: 408 m (1,339 ft)
- Lowest elevation: 227 m (745 ft)
- Population (2023): 371
  - Density: 40/km^{2} (100/sq mi)
- Time zone: UTC+01:00 (CET)
  - Summer (DST): UTC+02:00 (CEST)
- INSEE/Postal code: 55462 /55210
- ^{1} French Land Register data, which excludes lakes, ponds, glaciers > 1 km^{2} (0.386 sq mi or 247 acres) and river estuaries.

Saint-Maurice-sous-les-Côtes (French pronunciation: [sɛ̃ mɔʁis su le kot]; literally "Saint-Maurice under the Coasts") is a commune in the Meuse department in Grand Est in north-eastern France.

== See also ==
- Communes of the Meuse department
- Parc naturel régional de Lorraine
