= Jonville-en-Woëvre =

- Commune
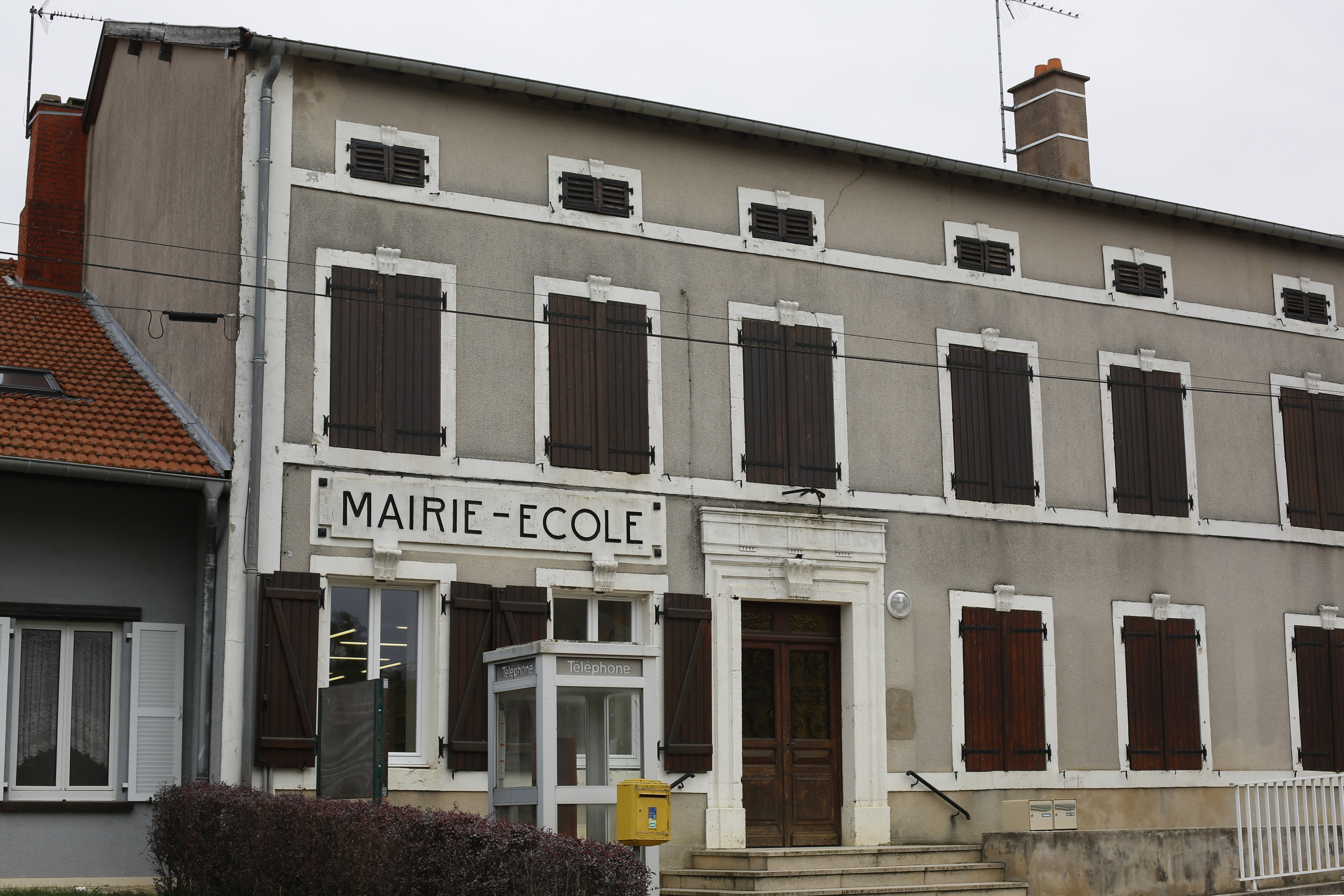
- The town hall and school in Jonville-en-Woëvre

- Coat of arms
- Location of Jonville-en-Woëvre
- Location within France Location within Grand Est
- Coordinates: 49°04′03″N 5°47′11″E
- Country: France
- Region: Grand Est
- Department: Meuse
- Arrondissement: Commercy
- Canton: Saint-Mihiel
- Intercommunality: Côtes de Meuse - Woëvre

Government
  - Mayor (2020–2026): Guillaume Paté
- Area^{1}: 10.81 km^{2} (4.17 sq mi)
- Elevation: 240 m (790 ft)
- Highest elevation: 231 m (758 ft)
- Lowest elevation: 201 m (659 ft)
- Population (2023): 143
  - Density: 13.2/km^{2} (34.3/sq mi)
- Time zone: UTC+01:00 (CET)
  - Summer (DST): UTC+02:00 (CEST)
- INSEE/Postal code: 55256 /55160
- ^{1} French Land Register data, which excludes lakes, ponds, glaciers > 1 km^{2} (0.386 sq mi or 247 acres) and river estuaries.

Jonville-en-Woëvre (French pronunciation: [ʒɔ̃vil ɑ̃ wavʁ]) is a commune in the Meuse department in Grand Est in north-eastern France.

== See also ==
- Communes of the Meuse department
