= Dompierre-aux-Bois =

- Commune
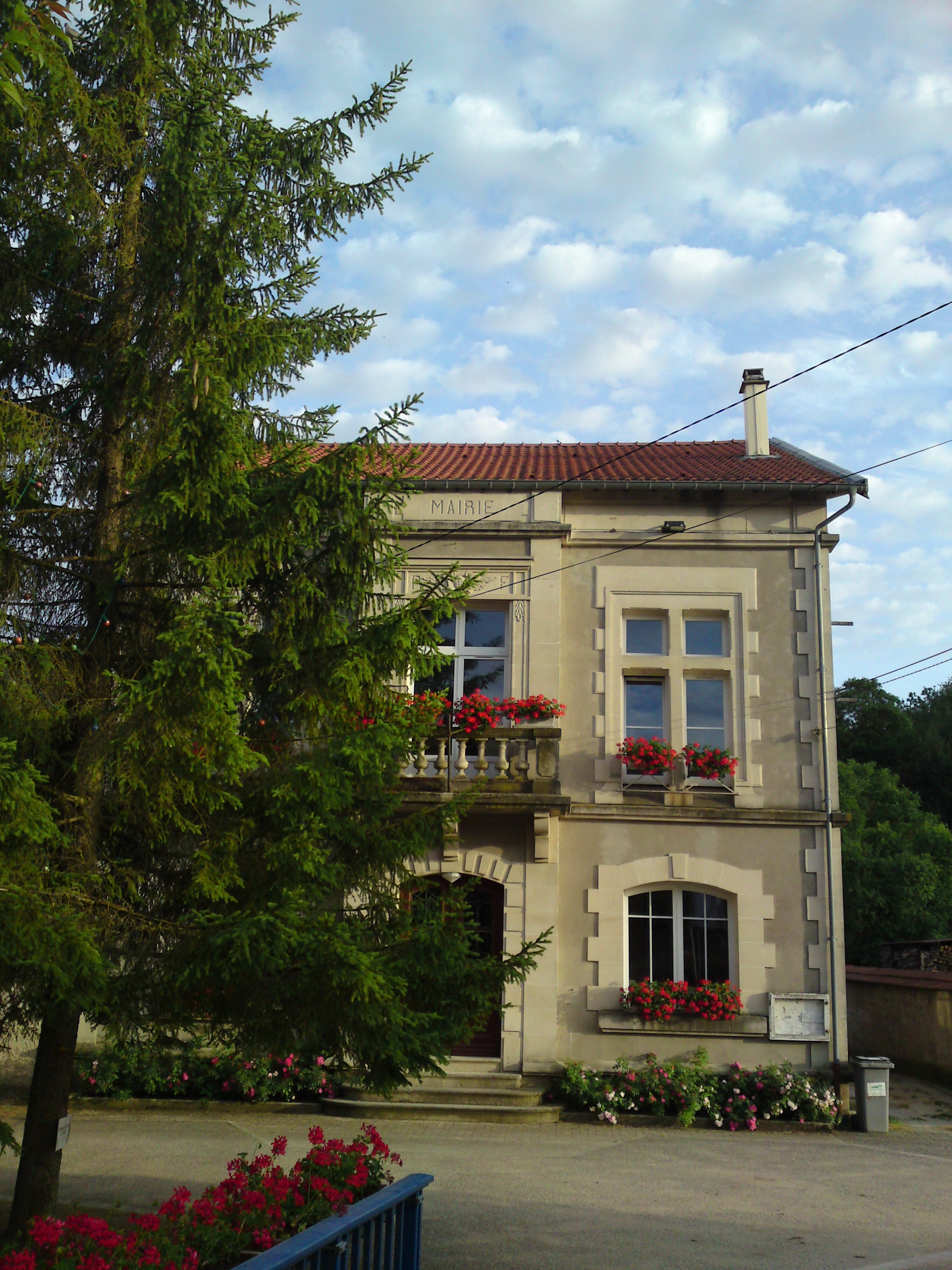
- The town hall in Dompierre-aux-Bois
- Location of Dompierre-aux-Bois
- Location within France Location within Grand Est
- Coordinates: 48°59′44″N 5°35′09″E
- Country: France
- Region: Grand Est
- Department: Meuse
- Arrondissement: Commercy
- Canton: Saint-Mihiel
- Intercommunality: Sammiellois

Government
  - Mayor (2020–2026): Patrick Cousin
- Area^{1}: 8.07 km^{2} (3.12 sq mi)
- Elevation: 910 m (2,990 ft)
- Highest elevation: 382 m (1,253 ft)
- Lowest elevation: 253 m (830 ft)
- Population (2023): 39
  - Density: 4.8/km^{2} (13/sq mi)
- Time zone: UTC+01:00 (CET)
  - Summer (DST): UTC+02:00 (CEST)
- INSEE/Postal code: 55160 /55300
- ^{1} French Land Register data, which excludes lakes, ponds, glaciers > 1 km^{2} (0.386 sq mi or 247 acres) and river estuaries.

Dompierre-aux-Bois (French pronunciation: [dɔ̃pjɛʁ o bwa]) is a commune in the Meuse department in Grand Est in north-eastern France.

== See also ==
- Communes of the Meuse department
- Parc naturel régional de Lorraine
