= Lachaussée =

- Commune
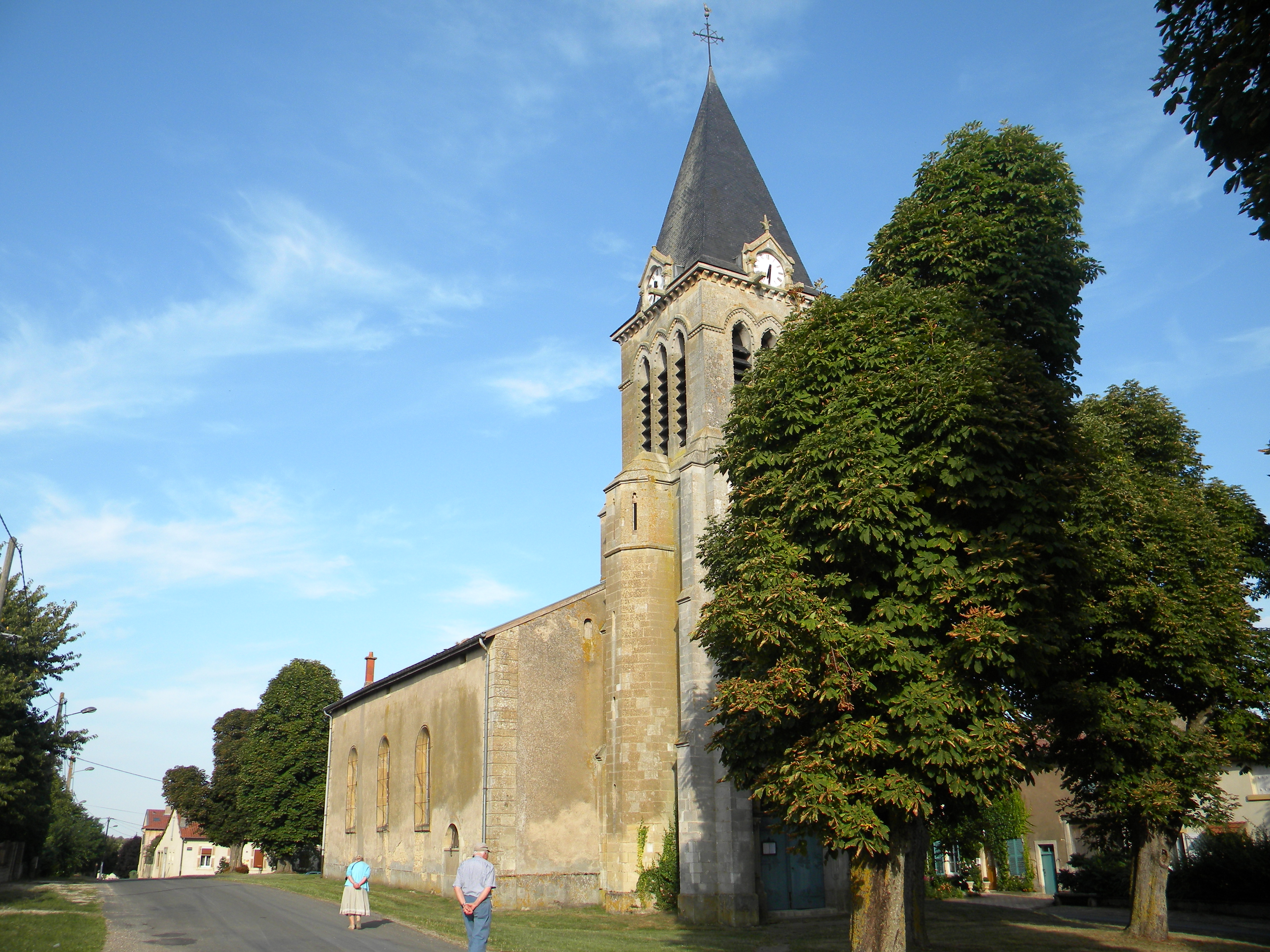
- The church in Lachaussée

- Coat of arms
- Location of Lachaussée
- Location within France Location within Grand Est
- Coordinates: 49°02′16″N 5°49′10″E
- Country: France
- Region: Grand Est
- Department: Meuse
- Arrondissement: Commercy
- Canton: Saint-Mihiel
- Intercommunality: Côtes de Meuse - Woëvre

Government
  - Mayor (2020–2026): Didier Kopocz
- Area^{1}: 27.19 km^{2} (10.50 sq mi)
- Elevation: 218 m (715 ft)
- Highest elevation: 238 m (781 ft)
- Lowest elevation: 203 m (666 ft)
- Population (2023): 271
  - Density: 9.97/km^{2} (25.8/sq mi)
- Time zone: UTC+01:00 (CET)
  - Summer (DST): UTC+02:00 (CEST)
- INSEE/Postal code: 55267 /55210
- ^{1} French Land Register data, which excludes lakes, ponds, glaciers > 1 km^{2} (0.386 sq mi or 247 acres) and river estuaries.

Lachaussée (French pronunciation: [laʃose]) is a commune in the Meuse department in Grand Est in north-eastern France. In January 1973, it absorbed the former communes Haumont-lès-Lachaussée and Hadonville-lès-Lachaussée.

== Geography ==
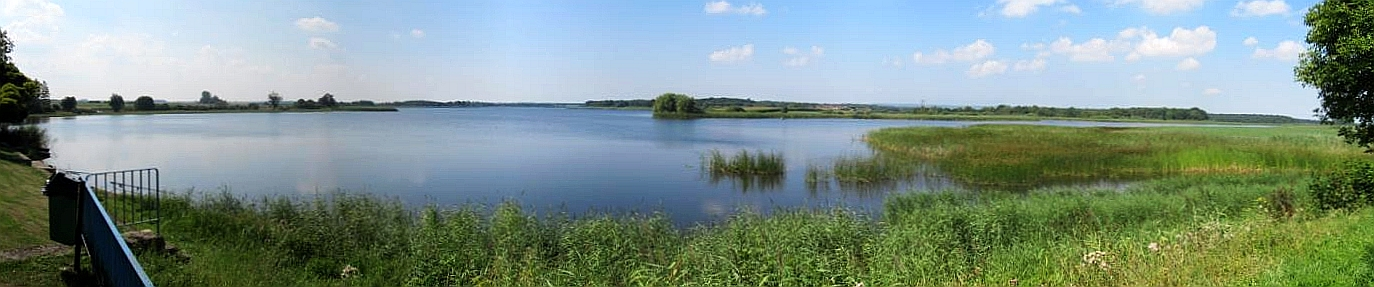
L'étang de Lachaussée

The village of Lachaussée lies on the south-eastern rim of a huge pond named Étang de Lachaussée, which was created during the Middle Ages from a marsh area and then devoted to pisciculture.

== See also ==
- Communes of the Meuse department
- Parc naturel régional de Lorraine
