= Nonsard-Lamarche =

- Commune
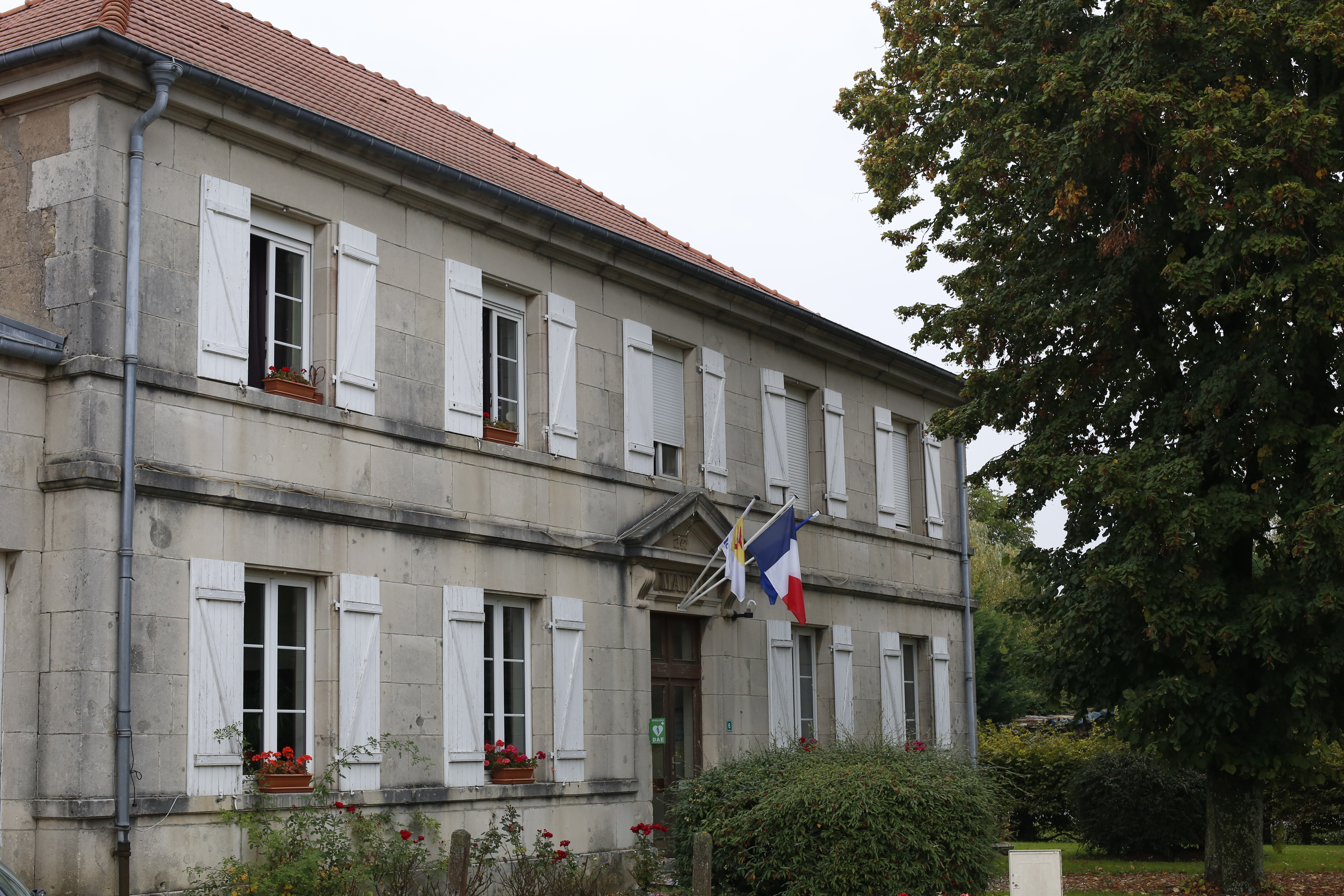
- The town hall in Nonsard-Lamarche
- Location of Nonsard-Lamarche
- Location within France Location within Grand Est
- Coordinates: 48°55′55″N 5°45′47″E
- Country: France
- Region: Grand Est
- Department: Meuse
- Arrondissement: Commercy
- Canton: Saint-Mihiel
- Intercommunality: Côtes de Meuse - Woëvre

Government
  - Mayor (2020–2026): Sylvain Denoyelle (DVD)
- Area^{1}: 18.18 km^{2} (7.02 sq mi)
- Elevation: 280 m (920 ft)
- Highest elevation: 237 m (778 ft)
- Lowest elevation: 214 m (702 ft)
- Population (2023): 219
  - Density: 12.0/km^{2} (31.2/sq mi)
- Time zone: UTC+01:00 (CET)
  - Summer (DST): UTC+02:00 (CEST)
- INSEE/Postal code: 55386 /55210
- ^{1} French Land Register data, which excludes lakes, ponds, glaciers > 1 km^{2} (0.386 sq mi or 247 acres) and river estuaries.

Nonsard-Lamarche (French pronunciation: [nɔ̃saʁ lamaʁʃ]) is a commune in the Meuse department in Grand Est in north-eastern France.

== Climate ==
Climate data for Nonsard-Lamarche (2002–2020 averages)
Month	Jan	Feb	Mar	Apr	May	Jun	Jul	Aug	Sep	Oct	Nov	Dec	Year
Record high °C (°F)	15.0 (59.0)	20.3 (68.5)	25.6 (78.1)	28.3 (82.9)	32.8 (91.0)	36.1 (97.0)	40.1 (104.2)	39.0 (102.2)	34.1 (93.4)	28.2 (82.8)	22.4 (72.3)	16.5 (61.7)	40.1 (104.2)
Mean daily maximum °C (°F)	5.2 (41.4)	6.5 (43.7)	11.2 (52.2)	16.2 (61.2)	19.5 (67.1)	23.5 (74.3)	25.6 (78.1)	24.8 (76.6)	21.1 (70.0)	15.5 (59.9)	9.7 (49.5)	6.0 (42.8)	15.4 (59.7)
Daily mean °C (°F)	2.5 (36.5)	3.1 (37.6)	6.3 (43.3)	10.1 (50.2)	13.7 (56.7)	17.4 (63.3)	19.4 (66.9)	18.9 (66.0)	15.2 (59.4)	11.1 (52.0)	6.7 (44.1)	3.5 (38.3)	10.7 (51.3)
Mean daily minimum °C (°F)	−0.2 (31.6)	−0.3 (31.5)	1.5 (34.7)	4.1 (39.4)	7.9 (46.2)	11.3 (52.3)	13.2 (55.8)	12.9 (55.2)	9.3 (48.7)	6.8 (44.2)	3.7 (38.7)	0.9 (33.6)	5.9 (42.6)
Record low °C (°F)	−15.2 (4.6)	−15.9 (3.4)	−17.0 (1.4)	−7.7 (18.1)	−1.2 (29.8)	1.4 (34.5)	4.5 (40.1)	3.5 (38.3)	−0.5 (31.1)	−5.9 (21.4)	−7.7 (18.1)	−16.1 (3.0)	−17.0 (1.4)
Average precipitation mm (inches)	65.7 (2.59)	55.9 (2.20)	49.4 (1.94)	38.9 (1.53)	66.2 (2.61)	56.6 (2.23)	53.4 (2.10)	59.6 (2.35)	49.4 (1.94)	62.3 (2.45)	60.4 (2.38)	73.0 (2.87)	690.8 (27.20)
Average precipitation days (≥ 1.0 mm)	12.4	9.9	9.8	7.1	9.2	8.8	7.9	8.6	6.5	9.4	11.1	12.4	113.1
Mean monthly sunshine hours	49.9	78.6	153.2	192.3	214.6	235.8	249.8	211.5	176.1	103.2	48.2	39.9	1,753
Source: Meteociel

== See also ==
- Communes of the Meuse department
- Parc naturel régional de Lorraine
