= Valbois =

- Commune
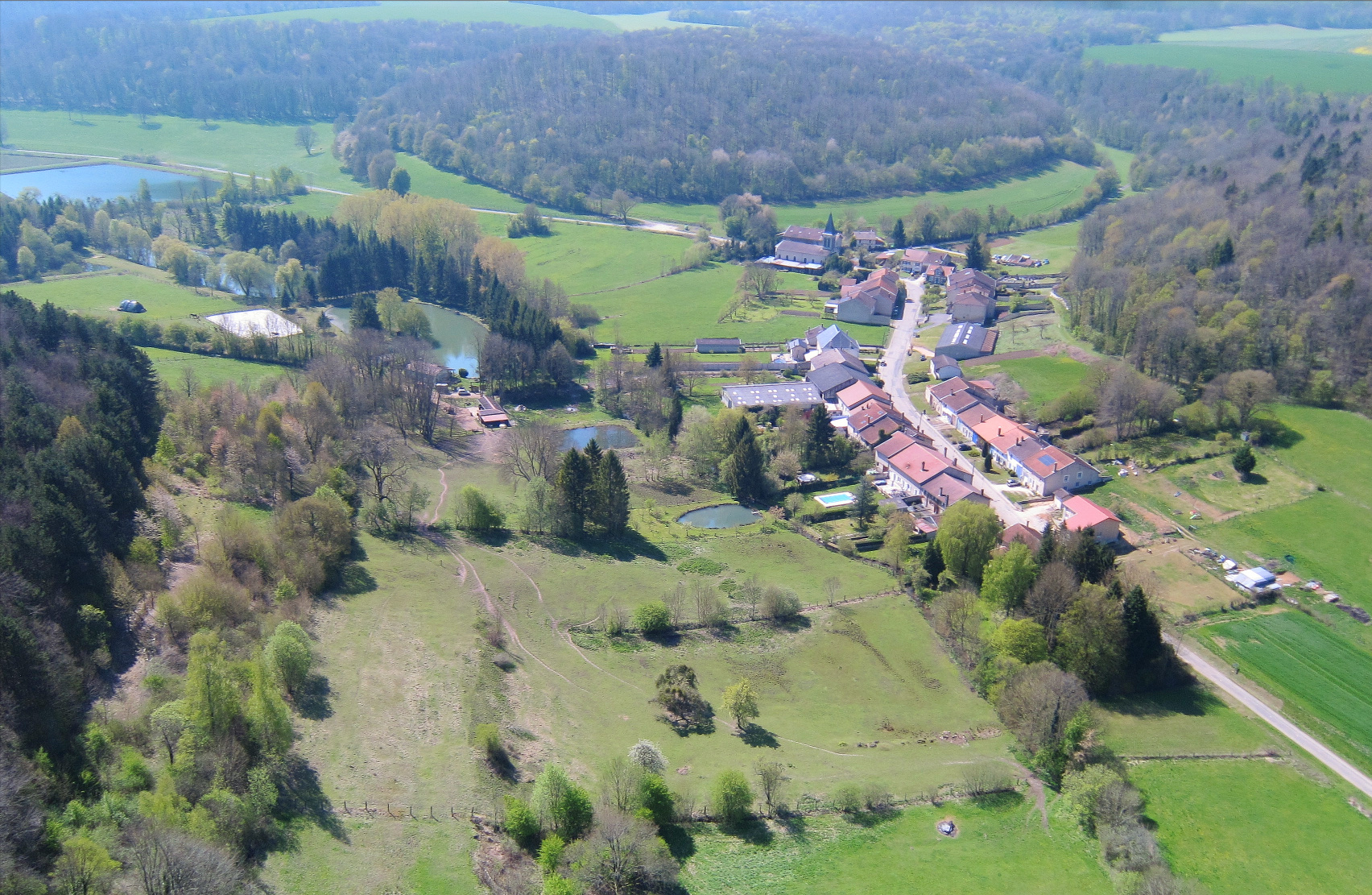
- An aerial view of Varvinay
- Location of Valbois
- Location within France Location within Grand Est
- Coordinates: 48°56′03″N 5°37′04″E
- Country: France
- Region: Grand Est
- Department: Meuse
- Arrondissement: Commercy
- Canton: Saint-Mihiel
- Intercommunality: Côtes de Meuse - Woëvre

Government
  - Mayor (2020–2026): Martine Marcus
- Area^{1}: 17.09 km^{2} (6.60 sq mi)
- Elevation: 260 m (850 ft)
- Highest elevation: 388 m (1,273 ft)
- Lowest elevation: 242 m (794 ft)
- Population (2023): 96
  - Density: 5.6/km^{2} (15/sq mi)
- Time zone: UTC+01:00 (CET)
  - Summer (DST): UTC+02:00 (CEST)
- INSEE/Postal code: 55530 /55300
- ^{1} French Land Register data, which excludes lakes, ponds, glaciers > 1 km^{2} (0.386 sq mi or 247 acres) and river estuaries.

Valbois (French pronunciation: [valbwa]) is a commune in the Meuse department in Grand Est in north-eastern France. It was created in 1973 by the merger of three former communes: Savonnières-en-Woëvre, Sénonville and Varvinay.

== See also ==
- Communes of the Meuse department
- Parc naturel régional de Lorraine
