= Heudicourt-sous-les-Côtes =

- Commune
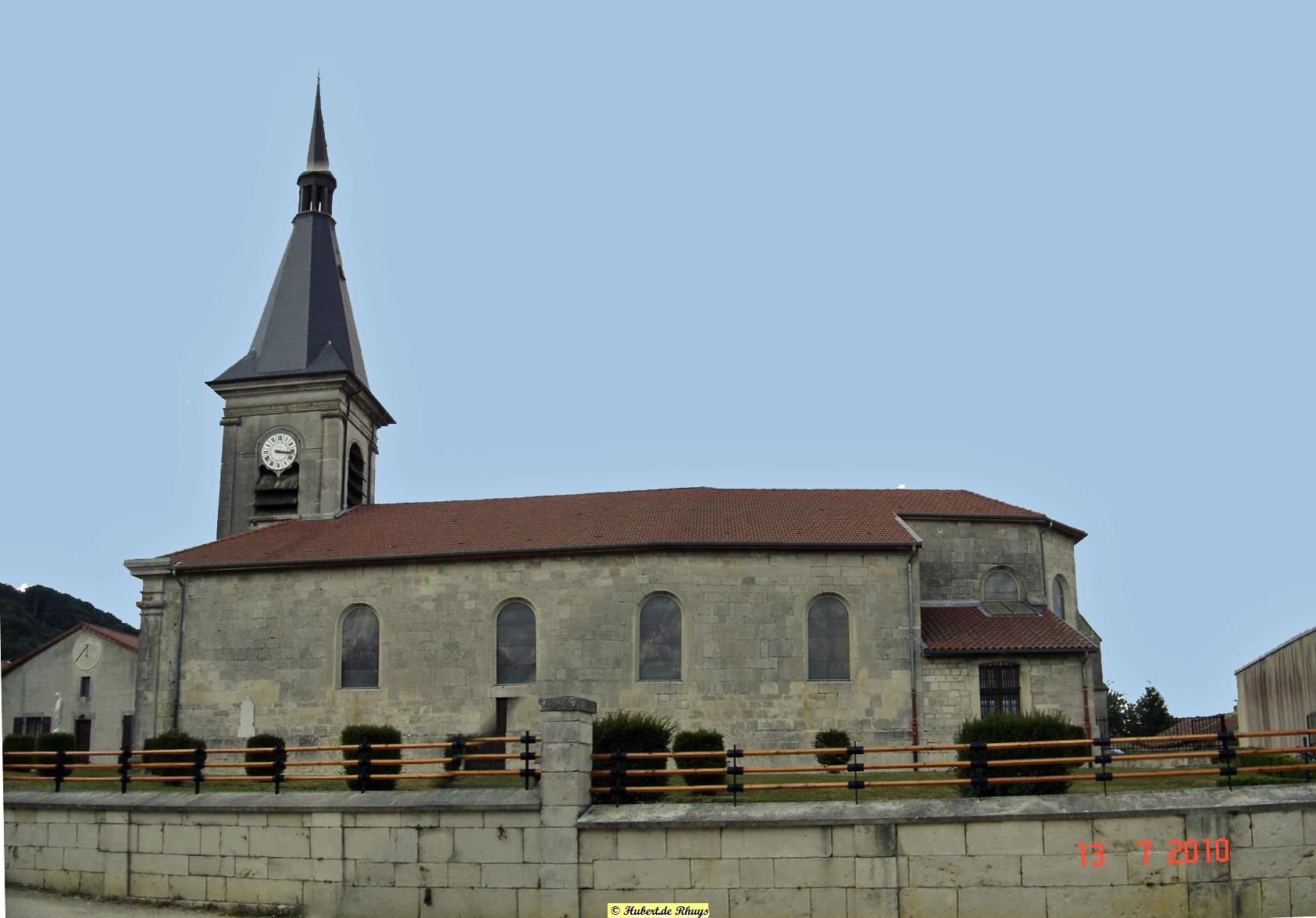
- The church in Heudicourt-sous-les-Côtes

- Coat of arms
- Location of Heudicourt-sous-les-Côtes
- Location within France Location within Grand Est
- Coordinates: 48°56′00″N 5°41′55″E
- Country: France
- Region: Grand Est
- Department: Meuse
- Arrondissement: Commercy
- Canton: Saint-Mihiel
- Intercommunality: Côtes de Meuse - Woëvre

Government
  - Mayor (2020–2026): Lionel Jacquemin
- Area^{1}: 13.56 km^{2} (5.24 sq mi)
- Elevation: 280 m (920 ft)
- Highest elevation: 386 m (1,266 ft)
- Lowest elevation: 226 m (741 ft)
- Population (2023): 172
  - Density: 12.7/km^{2} (32.9/sq mi)
- Time zone: UTC+01:00 (CET)
  - Summer (DST): UTC+02:00 (CEST)
- INSEE/Postal code: 55245 /55210
- ^{1} French Land Register data, which excludes lakes, ponds, glaciers > 1 km^{2} (0.386 sq mi or 247 acres) and river estuaries.

Heudicourt-sous-les-Côtes (French pronunciation: [ødikuʁ su le kote]) is a commune in the Meuse department in Grand Est in north-eastern France.

== See also ==
- Communes of the Meuse department
- Parc naturel régional de Lorraine
