= Canton of Saint-Mihiel =

Coordinates: 48.89°N 5.54°E

The canton of Saint-Mihiel is an administrative division of the Meuse department, northeastern France. Its borders were modified at the French canton reorganisation which came into effect in March 2015. Its seat is in Saint-Mihiel.

It consists of the following communes:

1. Apremont-la-Forêt
2. Beney-en-Woëvre
3. Bislée
4. Bouconville-sur-Madt
5. Broussey-Raulecourt
6. Buxières-sous-les-Côtes
7. Chaillon
8. Chauvoncourt
9. Dompierre-aux-Bois
10. Han-sur-Meuse
11. Heudicourt-sous-les-Côtes
12. Jonville-en-Woëvre
13. Lachaussée
14. Lacroix-sur-Meuse
15. Lahayville
16. Lamorville
17. Loupmont
18. Maizey
19. Montsec
20. Nonsard-Lamarche
21. Les Paroches
22. Rambucourt
23. Ranzières
24. Richecourt
25. Rouvrois-sur-Meuse
26. Saint-Maurice-sous-les-Côtes
27. Saint-Mihiel
28. Seuzey
29. Troyon
30. Valbois
31. Varnéville
32. Vaux-lès-Palameix
33. Vigneulles-lès-Hattonchâtel
34. Xivray-et-Marvoisin
