= Fort de Liouville =

- Part of Séré de Rivières system, Hauts de Meuse fortifications
- France
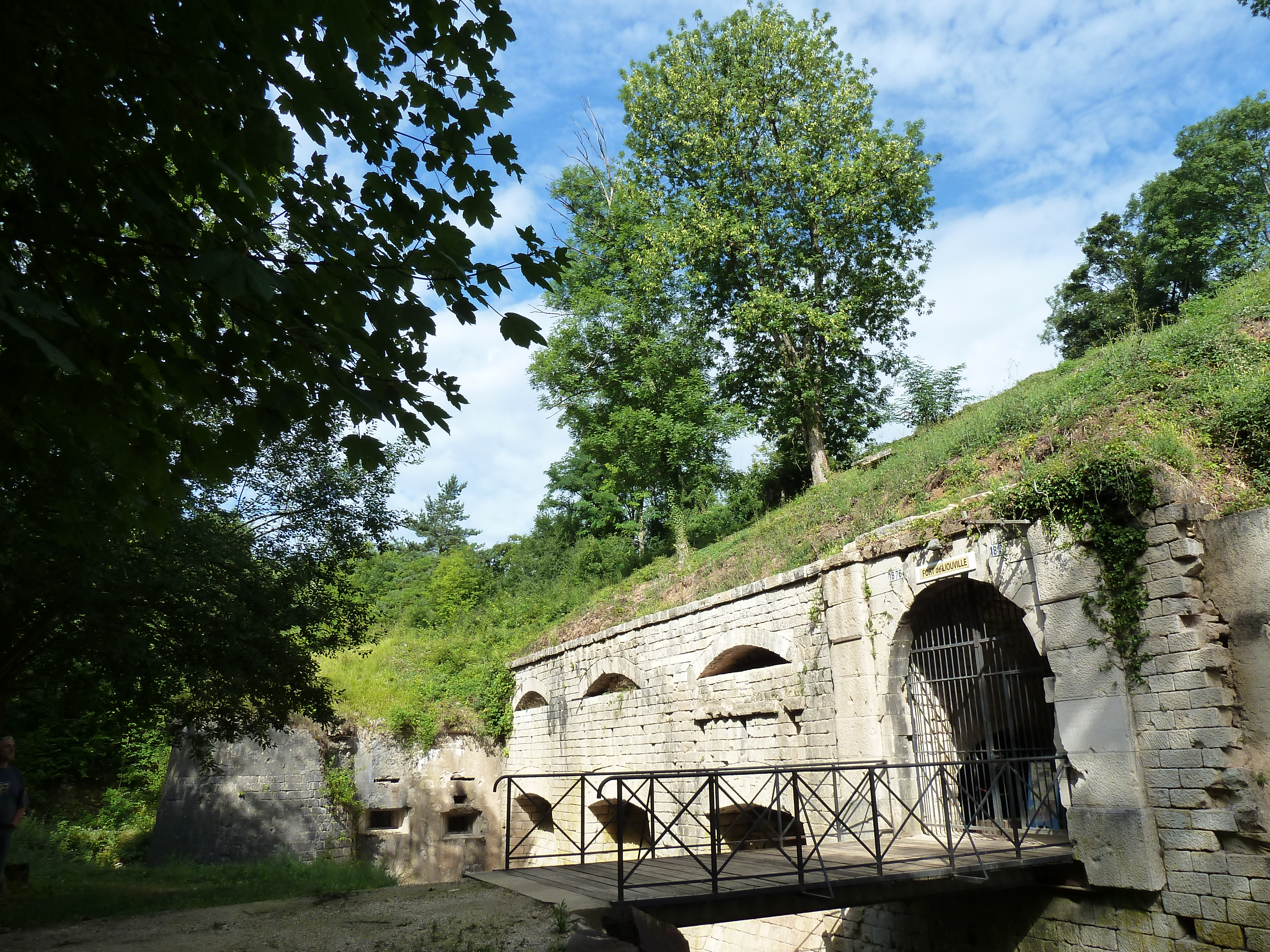

Site information
- Type: Fort
- Controlled by: France
- Open to the public: Yes

Location
- Coordinates: 48.8309°N 5.6224°E

Site history
- Built: 1876

Garrison information
- Garrison: 691

The Fort de Liouville, also known as Fort Stengel, located between the communes of Saint-Agnant-sous-les-Côtes and Saint-Julien-sous-les-Côtes, near the town of Commercy in the Meuse departement of France, is one of the forts built at the end of the 19th century to defend the valley of the Meuse. The fort was located on what was then the French frontier facing the German-occupied province of Lorraine. The Fort de Liouville was located between the Fort de Gironville and the Camp des Romains.

== History ==
In 1870, France was partly occupied by the Prussian army. As a result of this defeat, the Séré de Rivières system of fortifications was planned and constructed to defend the nation.

Construction started in 1876 on the roughly rectangular fort with a garrison of 691 troops. Work was completed in 1880, at a cost of 2,108,000 francs. The fort was updated between 1892 and 1910 with a protected magazine, replacement of caponiers with counterscarps, and preparations for a Mougin turret with two 155 mm guns.

The Mougin turret and guns were installed in 1914, along with two machine gun turrets, a 75mm gun turret and two observation cloches. The fort was armed with a total of 40 artillery pieces in 1914. It was the only fort in the Hauts de Meuse line to receive concrete cover, but did not get concrete-protected barracks.

The fort dominates the Woëvre valley and blocks the Marbotte and Lérouville gaps in the Hauts de Meuse, watching over the rail line to Lérouville. Unusually, the gorge, or entry side of the fort faces German territory, since the fort is built on a west-facing escarpment.

Fort de Liouville was bombarded by German artillery for a large portion of the war, with the heaviest fire between 22 September and 16 October 1914. The Mougin turret was hit by a 305mm German shell, but continued to fire with one gun until 28 September. The north ammunition magazine was penetrated by shellfire. The 75mm turret fired despite considerable trouble with the mechanism and numerous casualties until the fort was evacuated, and the turret was jammed by a direct 305mm hit. Infantry continued to hold the area, and the fort was not taken. The fort suffered significant damage to its casemates. It served as an observatory facing German lines and resting place for the regiments taken out of combat.

In 1938 a machine gun turret was removed and mounted at the Bastion de la Riene at the Citadel of Verdun.

The fort displays an unusual degree of attention to design, with window frames resembling Gothic tracery.

The fort is maintained by an association for its preservation.

== Batterie de Saint-Agnant ==
A triangular position built 1878-1880 as an annex to Liouville, with three 120mm guns prior to 1910. The position also had two Pamart casemate/cupolas for machine guns. It was severely bombarded during the first world war and is now abandoned.
