= Mécrin =

- Commune
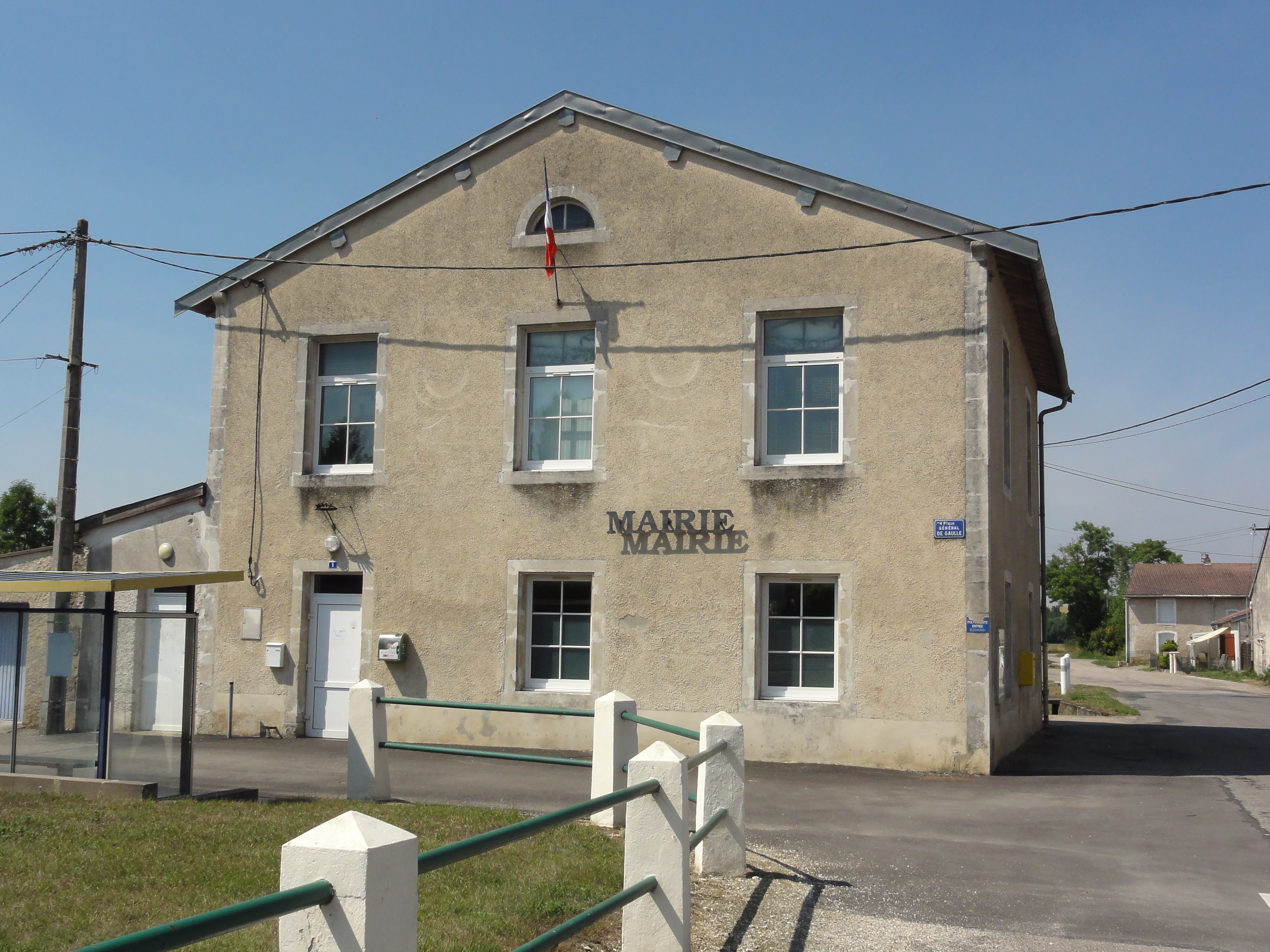
- The town hall in Mécrin

- Coat of arms
- Location of Mécrin
- Location within France Location within Grand Est
- Coordinates: 48°49′33″N 5°32′01″E
- Country: France
- Region: Grand Est
- Department: Meuse
- Arrondissement: Commercy
- Canton: Commercy

Government
  - Mayor (2020–2026): Michel Mousty
- Area^{1}: 10.19 km^{2} (3.93 sq mi)
- Elevation: 226 m (741 ft)
- Highest elevation: 358 m (1,175 ft)
- Lowest elevation: 222 m (728 ft)
- Population (2023): 183
  - Density: 18.0/km^{2} (46.5/sq mi)
- Time zone: UTC+01:00 (CET)
  - Summer (DST): UTC+02:00 (CEST)
- INSEE/Postal code: 55329 /55300
- ^{1} French Land Register data, which excludes lakes, ponds, glaciers > 1 km^{2} (0.386 sq mi or 247 acres) and river estuaries.

Mécrin (French pronunciation: [mekʁɛ̃]) is a commune in the Meuse department in Grand Est in north-eastern France.

== See also ==
- Communes of the Meuse department
- Parc naturel régional de Lorraine
