= Frémeréville-sous-les-Côtes =

- Commune
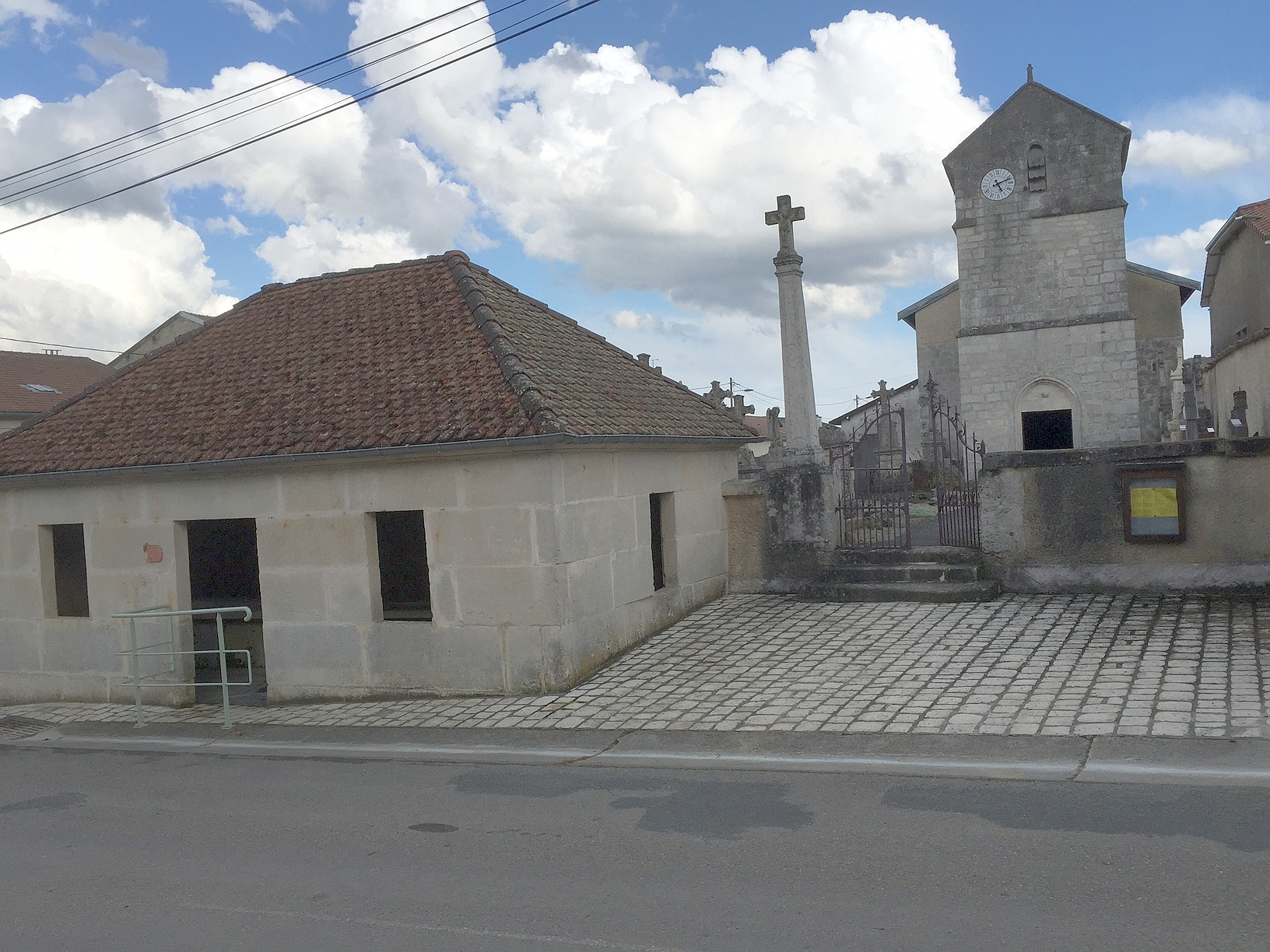
- The church and wash house in Frémeréville-sous-les-Côtes

- Coat of arms
- Location of Frémeréville-sous-les-Côtes
- Location within France Location within Grand Est
- Coordinates: 48°48′06″N 5°39′19″E
- Country: France
- Region: Grand Est
- Department: Meuse
- Arrondissement: Commercy
- Canton: Commercy
- Intercommunality: CC Côtes de Meuse Woëvre

Government
  - Mayor (2020–2026): Vincent Lacorde
- Area^{1}: 6.44 km^{2} (2.49 sq mi)
- Elevation: 225 m (738 ft)
- Highest elevation: 375 m (1,230 ft)
- Lowest elevation: 233 m (764 ft)
- Population (2023): 129
  - Density: 20.0/km^{2} (51.9/sq mi)
- Time zone: UTC+01:00 (CET)
  - Summer (DST): UTC+02:00 (CEST)
- INSEE/Postal code: 55196 /55200
- ^{1} French Land Register data, which excludes lakes, ponds, glaciers > 1 km^{2} (0.386 sq mi or 247 acres) and river estuaries.

Frémeréville-sous-les-Côtes (French pronunciation: [fʁem(ə)ʁevil su le kot]) is a commune in the Meuse department in Grand Est in north-eastern France.

== See also ==
- Communes of the Meuse department
- Parc naturel régional de Lorraine
