= Fortified Sector of Montbéliard =

French military organization

The Fortified Sector of Montbéliard (Secteur Fortifié de Montbéliard) was the French military organization that in 1940 controlled the section of the French border with Switzerland in the vicinity of Montbéliard. The Montbéliard sector stands in the vicinity of the Belfort Gap, a traditional invasion route into eastern France. However, the area was lightly defended, as the Swiss border was not regarded as an area with a high risk of invasion, and because the left bank of the Rhine was firmly in French hands.

== Concept and organization ==
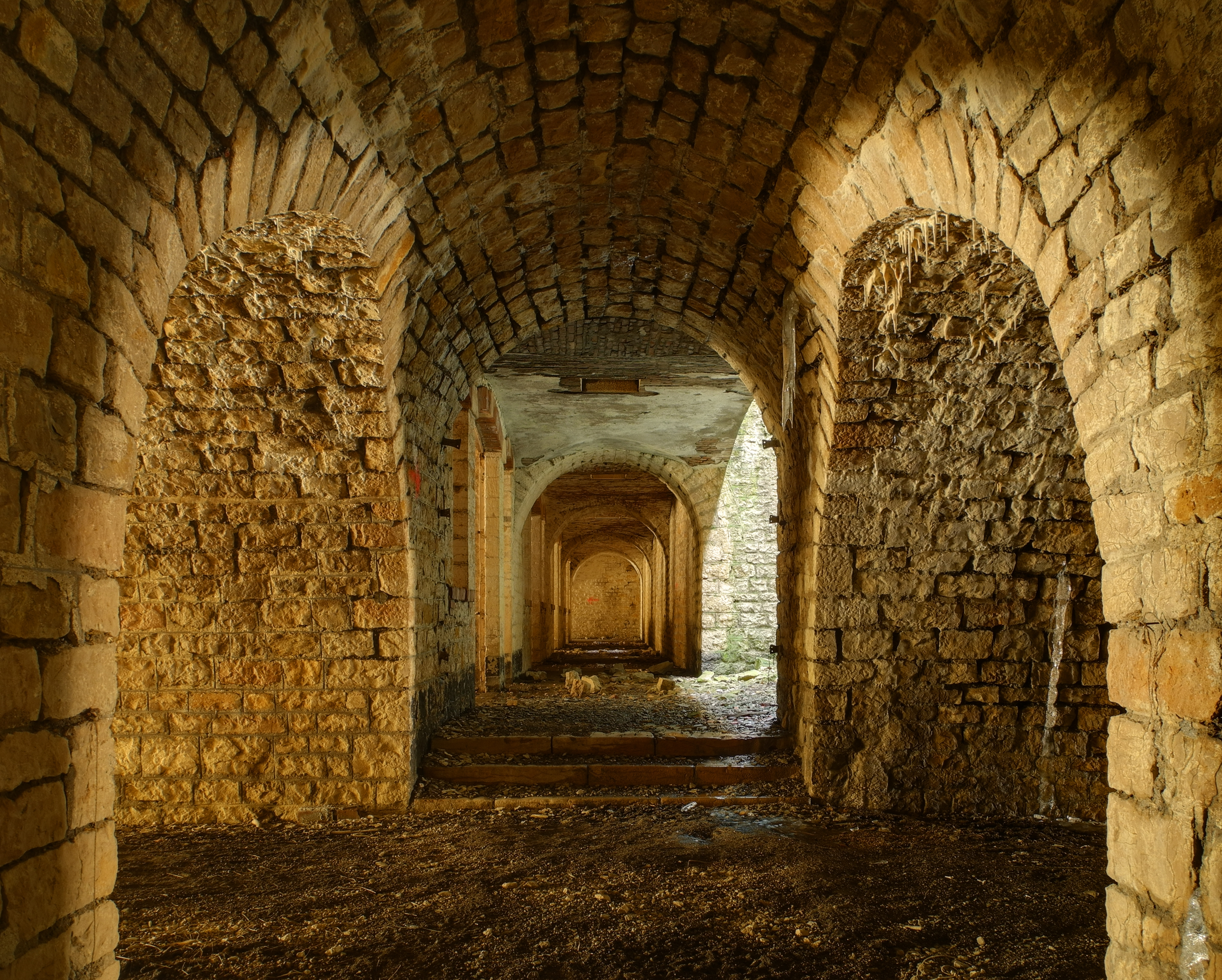
Fort du Lomont

The Montbéliard sector was chiefly composed of old Séré de Rivières system fortifications constructed to defend the Belfort Gap. The main positions were the Fort du Mont Bart and the Fort du Lomont.

== Command ==
The Montbéliard sector was under the command of the Fortified Region of Belfort until 16 March 1940, when the Belfort region became the 44th Army Fortress Corps (44e Corps d'Armée de Forteresse), retaining the Montbéliard sector under its command. The sector's commanding general was General de Bizemont until 19 May 1940, then Colonel Gard, with a command post at the Fort de Lomont. The sector was known as the Defensive Sector of Montbéliard until 16 March 1940. No field army forces were assigned to the sector. At the midpoint of the Battle of France on 1 June 1940, the troops of the SF Montbéliard amounted to a chasseurs pyrénéens regiment in two battalions, comprising 235 officers and 7,390 men.

== Bibliography ==
- Allcorn, William. The Maginot Line 1928-45. Oxford: Osprey Publishing, 2003. ISBN 1-84176-646-1
- Kaufmann, J.E. and Kaufmann, H.W. Fortress France: The Maginot Line and French Defenses in World War II, Stackpole Books, 2006. ISBN 0-275-98345-5
- Kaufmann, J.E., Kaufmann, H.W., Jancovič-Potočnik, A. and Lang, P. The Maginot Line: History and Guide, Pen and Sword, 2011. ISBN 978-1-84884-068-3
- Mary, Jean-Yves; Hohnadel, Alain; Sicard, Jacques. Hommes et Ouvrages de la Ligne Maginot, Tome 1. Paris, Histoire & Collections, 2001. ISBN 2-908182-88-2 (in French)
- Mary, Jean-Yves; Hohnadel, Alain; Sicard, Jacques. Hommes et Ouvrages de la Ligne Maginot, Tome 3. Paris, Histoire & Collections, 2003. ISBN 2-913903-88-6 (in French)
- Mary, Jean-Yves; Hohnadel, Alain; Sicard, Jacques. Hommes et Ouvrages de la Ligne Maginot, Tome 5. Paris, Histoire & Collections, 2009. ISBN 978-2-35250-127-5 (in French)
- Romanych, Marc; Rupp, Martin. Maginot Line 1940: Battles on the French Frontier. Oxford: Osprey Publishing, 2010. ISBN 1-84176-646-1
