= Canton of Commercy =

Coordinates: 48.76°N 5.59°E

The canton of Commercy is an administrative division of the Meuse department, northeastern France. Its borders were modified at the French canton reorganisation which came into effect in March 2015. Its seat is in Commercy.

It consists of the following communes:

1. Boncourt-sur-Meuse
2. Chonville-Malaumont
3. Commercy
4. Euville
5. Frémeréville-sous-les-Côtes
6. Girauvoisin
7. Grimaucourt-près-Sampigny
8. Geville
9. Lérouville
10. Mécrin
11. Pont-sur-Meuse
12. Saint-Julien-sous-les-Côtes
13. Vadonville
14. Vignot
