= Vadonville =

- Commune
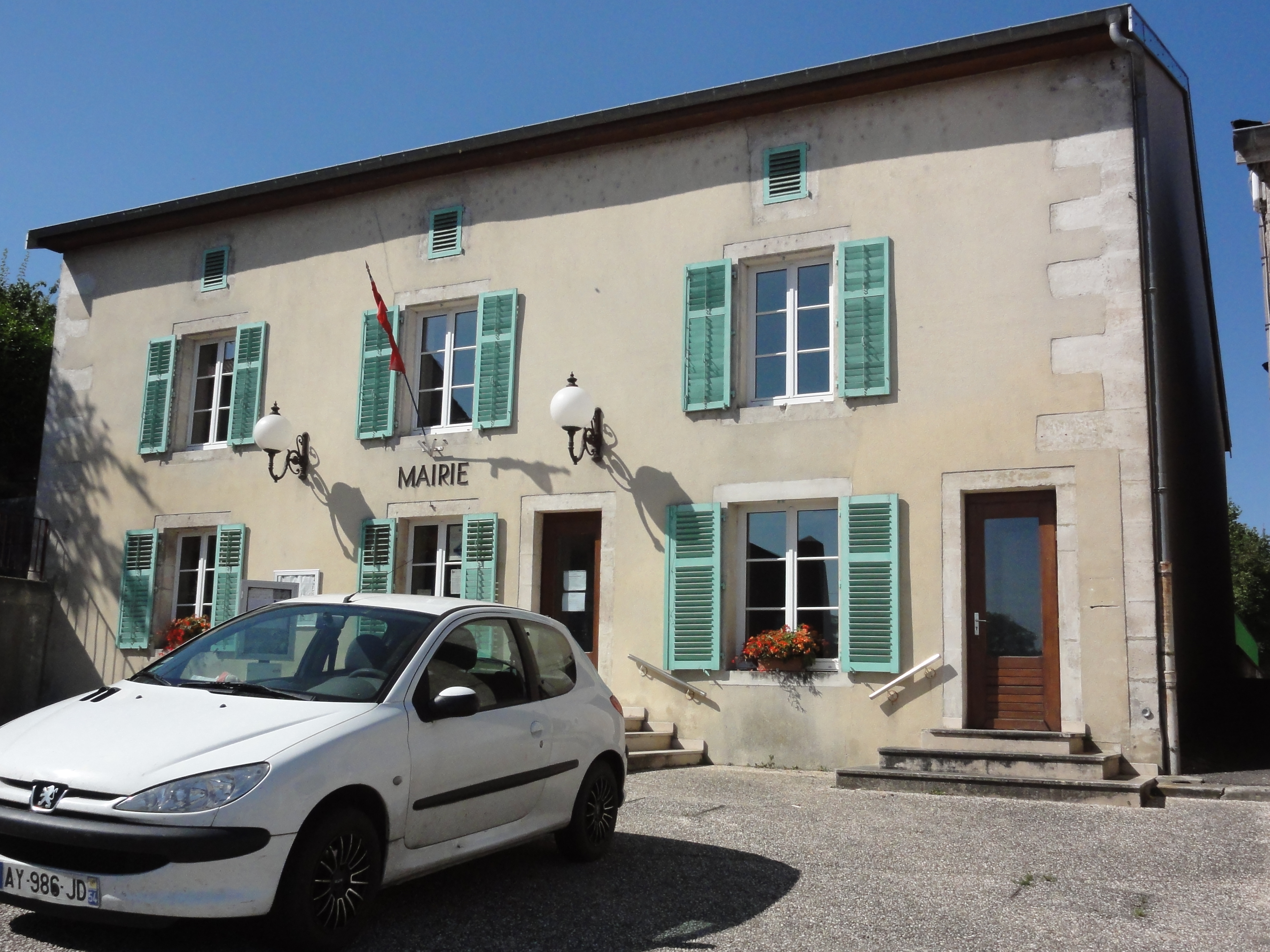
- The town hall in Vadonville

- Coat of arms
- Location of Vadonville
- Location within France Location within Grand Est
- Coordinates: 48°48′10″N 5°31′31″E
- Country: France
- Region: Grand Est
- Department: Meuse
- Arrondissement: Commercy
- Canton: Commercy

Government
  - Mayor (2020–2026): Jean Evotte
- Area^{1}: 5.21 km^{2} (2.01 sq mi)
- Elevation: 232 m (761 ft)
- Highest elevation: 326 m (1,070 ft)
- Lowest elevation: 224 m (735 ft)
- Population (2023): 245
  - Density: 47.0/km^{2} (122/sq mi)
- Time zone: UTC+01:00 (CET)
  - Summer (DST): UTC+02:00 (CEST)
- INSEE/Postal code: 55526 /55200
- ^{1} French Land Register data, which excludes lakes, ponds, glaciers > 1 km^{2} (0.386 sq mi or 247 acres) and river estuaries.

Vadonville (French pronunciation: [vadɔ̃vil]) is a commune in the Meuse department in Grand Est in north-eastern France.

== See also ==
- Communes of the Meuse department
