= Ouvrage Barbonnet =

Ouvrage Barbonnet, Fort Suchet
- Part of Maginot Line, Alpine Line
- Southeast France

Site information
- Controlled by: France
- Open to the public: Yes (summer)
- Condition: Preserved

Location
- Coordinates: 43.86192°N 7.44526°E

Site history
- Built: 1883 (Suchet), 1931 (Barbonnet)
- Built by: CORF
- Materials: Concrete, steel, rock excavation
- Battles/wars: Italian invasion of France, Operation Dragoon

Garrison information
- Garrison: 215 (Maginot 1940), 365 (Suchet 1888)

Ouvrage Barbonnet is a work (gros ouvrage) of the Maginot Line's Alpine extension, the Alpine Line, also called the Little Maginot Line. The ouvrage consists of one entry block and one infantry block facing Italy. The ouvrage was built somewhat behind the main line of fortifications on the old Fort Suchet, which was already armed with two obsolete Mougin 155 mm gun turrets.

Fort Suchet was built between 1883 and 1888 at 850 metres altitude two kilometres to the south of Sospel, dominating the road from Nice to the Col de Tende. This corridor represented the main invasion route to Nice from the north.

Fort Suchet and Ouvrage Barbonnet operated separately, the former manned in 1940 by elements of the 157th and 158th Régiments d'Artillerie de Position (RAP) and the latter by the 95th Brigade Alpin de Forteresse (BAF), which also provided infantry support on the surface. The entire position was commanded by Captain Imbault. The Maginot fort's kitchens were used by the garrisons of both fortifications, but the mess halls were separate.

== Ouvrage Barbonnet description ==
Barbonnet has only two blocks, an entry block and an artillery block, and, like all Maginot fortifications, is entirely subterranean. The Mougin battery is not linked to the Maginot fort. A link had been contemplated and a fully integrated design was prepared in 1929, but the arrangement of Suchet's magazines and concerns about structure and cost prevented work on a link from taking place. In particular, the magazines of Fort Suchet were not considered proof against modern artillery. Block 2 is just to the south of the old fort, outside its walls and facing south, with its galleries, usine and magazines running under the east side of Suchet, at an elevation of 748 metres.

- Block 1 (entry): one machine gun cloche and three machine gun embrasures.
- Block 2 (entry): one machine gun cloche, one grenade launcher cloche, three machine gun embrasures, two 75mm/29cal guns and two 81mm mortars.

Two flanking infantry blocks were proposed but not carried out, one to the south with two heavy twin machine gun positions, a GFM cloche and an observation cloche, and a detached position to the north with a GFM cloche.

A small blockhouse and casemate are located to the south of the main fortification. Casemate Barbonnet Sud was equipped with one FM machine gun and two automatic rifle positions.

Barbonnet's Maginot fortifications were built between November 1931 and February 1935 by a contractor named Borie, at a cost of 10.8 million francs.

=== Observation posts ===
Four observation posts are associated with Barbonnet, including Avellan and Petit Ventabren.

== Fort Suchet description ==
Fort Suchet was built as part of the Séré de Rivières system fortifications that were designed to respond to the rapid development of artillery in the late 19th century. Built between 1883 and 1886, Suchet is a rough trapezoid with a wall and ditch around its perimeter, defended by caponiers. It crowns a prominent peak 340 metres (1,120 ft) above the surrounding valley, giving the peak a sawn-off appearance. The fort's primary armament were four 155mm guns in Mougin twin turrets, named "Jeanne d'Arc" and "Bayard." In 1888 the fort also mounted two reserve 155mm guns, ten 95mm guns, one 32mm mortar and several smaller weapons. At the time of its completion, Fort Suchet was one of the three strongest forts in France. A third Mougin turret outside the fort was proposed in 1903, along with two machine gun turrets. None were built, but the existing turrets were reinforced with concrete in 1913–1914, along with minor improvements to other features. Electricity was provided at this time. More concrete was added to the north caponier in 1928, with ventilation improvements for the turrets in 1930. An aerial tram was proposed for access, but not pursued. A 1934 project to install a deeply buried magazine under the Mougin turrets caused cracking in the fort's masonry, and the project was abandoned. A 1938 project to link to the Maginot fortification was likewise not pursued.

The Mougin guns were used in June 1940 to fire on Italian positions. The guns were replaced after the war with similar weapons taken from forts in the northeast of France, the Fort de Frouard (Jeanne d'Arc turret) and the Fort de Villey-le-Sec (Bayard turret), near Nancy and Toul, respectively. In 1963 the fort was deactivated and the Bayard guns were returned to Villey-le-Sec, where the turret has been restored to operating condition.

== Present status ==
The Maginot and Séré de Rivières works may be visited in the summer months, and house a museum.

== See also ==
- List of Alpine Line ouvrages

== Bibliography ==
- Allcorn, William. The Maginot Line 1928-45. Oxford: Osprey Publishing, 2003. ISBN 1-84176-646-1
- Kaufmann, J.E. and Kaufmann, H.W. Fortress France: The Maginot Line and French Defenses in World War II, Stackpole Books, 2006. ISBN 0-275-98345-5
- Kaufmann, J.E., Kaufmann, H.W., Jancovič-Potočnik, A. and Lang, P. The Maginot Line: History and Guide, Pen and Sword, 2011. ISBN 978-1-84884-068-3
- Mary, Jean-Yves; Hohnadel, Alain; Sicard, Jacques. Hommes et Ouvrages de la Ligne Maginot, Tome 1. Paris, Histoire & Collections, 2001. ISBN 2-908182-88-2 (in French)
- Mary, Jean-Yves; Hohnadel, Alain; Sicard, Jacques. Hommes et Ouvrages de la Ligne Maginot, Tome 4 – La fortification alpine. Paris, Histoire & Collections, 2009. ISBN 978-2-915239-46-1 (in French)
- Mary, Jean-Yves; Hohnadel, Alain; Sicard, Jacques. Hommes et Ouvrages de la Ligne Maginot, Tome 5. Paris, Histoire & Collections, 2009. ISBN 978-2-35250-127-5 (in French)
