= Girauvoisin =

- Commune
- Coat of arms
- Location of Girauvoisin
- Location within France Location within Grand Est
- Coordinates: 48°48′16″N 5°37′45″E
- Country: France
- Region: Grand Est
- Department: Meuse
- Arrondissement: Commercy
- Canton: Commercy
- Intercommunality: CC Côtes de Meuse Woëvre

Government
  - Mayor (2020–2026): Dominique Large
- Area^{1}: 5.06 km^{2} (1.95 sq mi)
- Elevation: 235 m (771 ft)
- Highest elevation: 370 m (1,210 ft)
- Lowest elevation: 237 m (778 ft)
- Population (2023): 70
  - Density: 14/km^{2} (36/sq mi)
- Time zone: UTC+01:00 (CET)
  - Summer (DST): UTC+02:00 (CEST)
- INSEE/Postal code: 55212 /55200
- ^{1} French Land Register data, which excludes lakes, ponds, glaciers > 1 km^{2} (0.386 sq mi or 247 acres) and river estuaries.

Girauvoisin (French pronunciation: [ʒiʁovwazɛ̃]) is a commune in the Meuse department in Grand Est in north-eastern France.

== See also ==
- Communes of the Meuse department
- Parc naturel régional de Lorraine
