= Pont-sur-Meuse =

- Commune
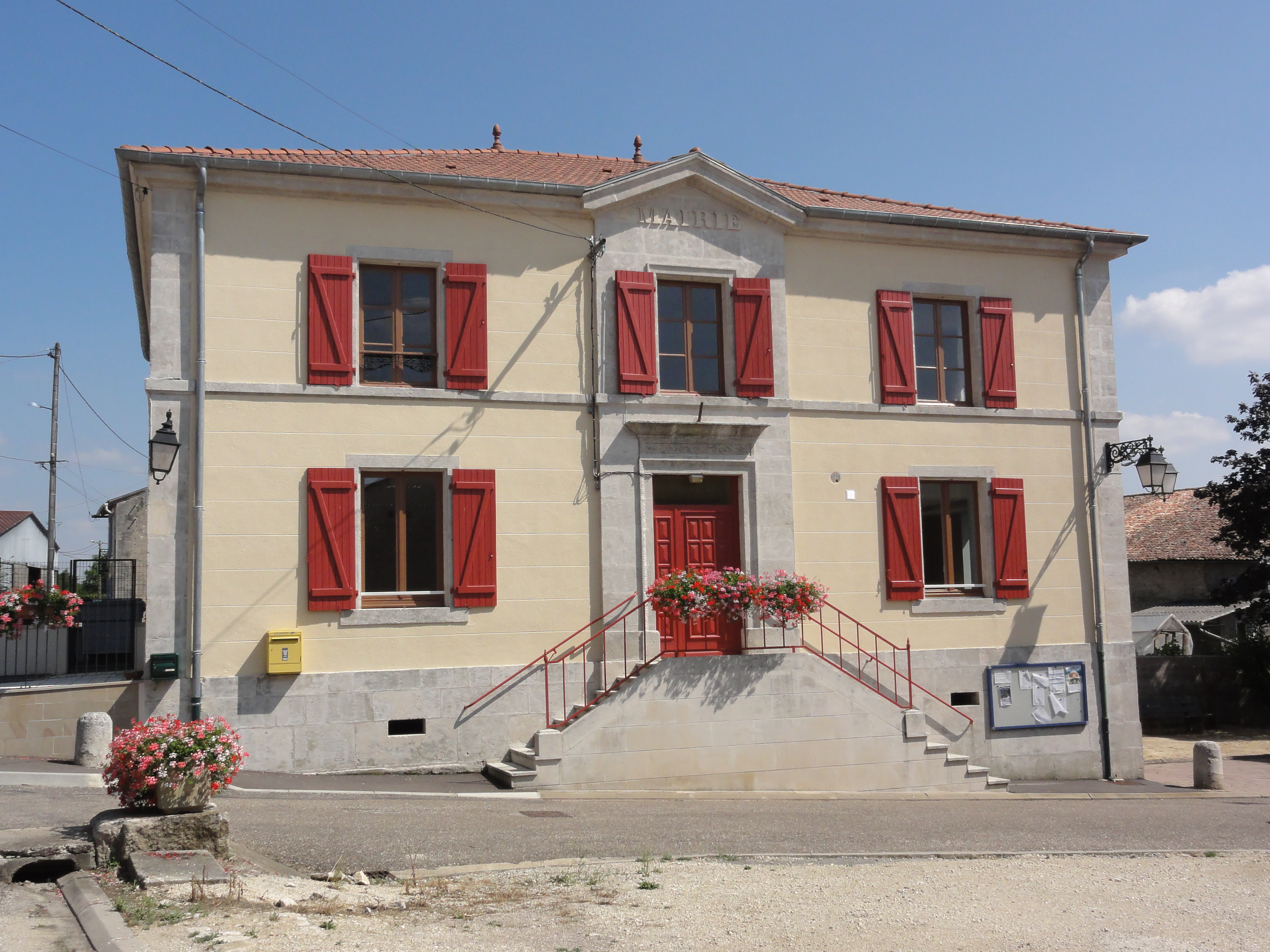
- The town hall in Pont-sur-Meuse

- Coat of arms
- Location of Pont-sur-Meuse
- Location within France Location within Grand Est
- Coordinates: 48°48′08″N 5°32′56″E
- Country: France
- Region: Grand Est
- Department: Meuse
- Arrondissement: Commercy
- Canton: Commercy

Government
  - Mayor (2020–2026): Reynald Gruyer
- Area^{1}: 3.63 km^{2} (1.40 sq mi)
- Elevation: 234 m (768 ft)
- Highest elevation: 332 m (1,089 ft)
- Lowest elevation: 224 m (735 ft)
- Population (2023): 131
  - Density: 36.1/km^{2} (93.5/sq mi)
- Time zone: UTC+01:00 (CET)
  - Summer (DST): UTC+02:00 (CEST)
- INSEE/Postal code: 55407 /55200
- ^{1} French Land Register data, which excludes lakes, ponds, glaciers > 1 km^{2} (0.386 sq mi or 247 acres) and river estuaries.

Pont-sur-Meuse (French pronunciation: [pɔ̃ syʁ møz], literally Bridge on Meuse) is a commune in the Meuse department in Grand Est in north-eastern France.

== See also ==
- Communes of the Meuse department
- Parc naturel régional de Lorraine
