= Mougin turret =

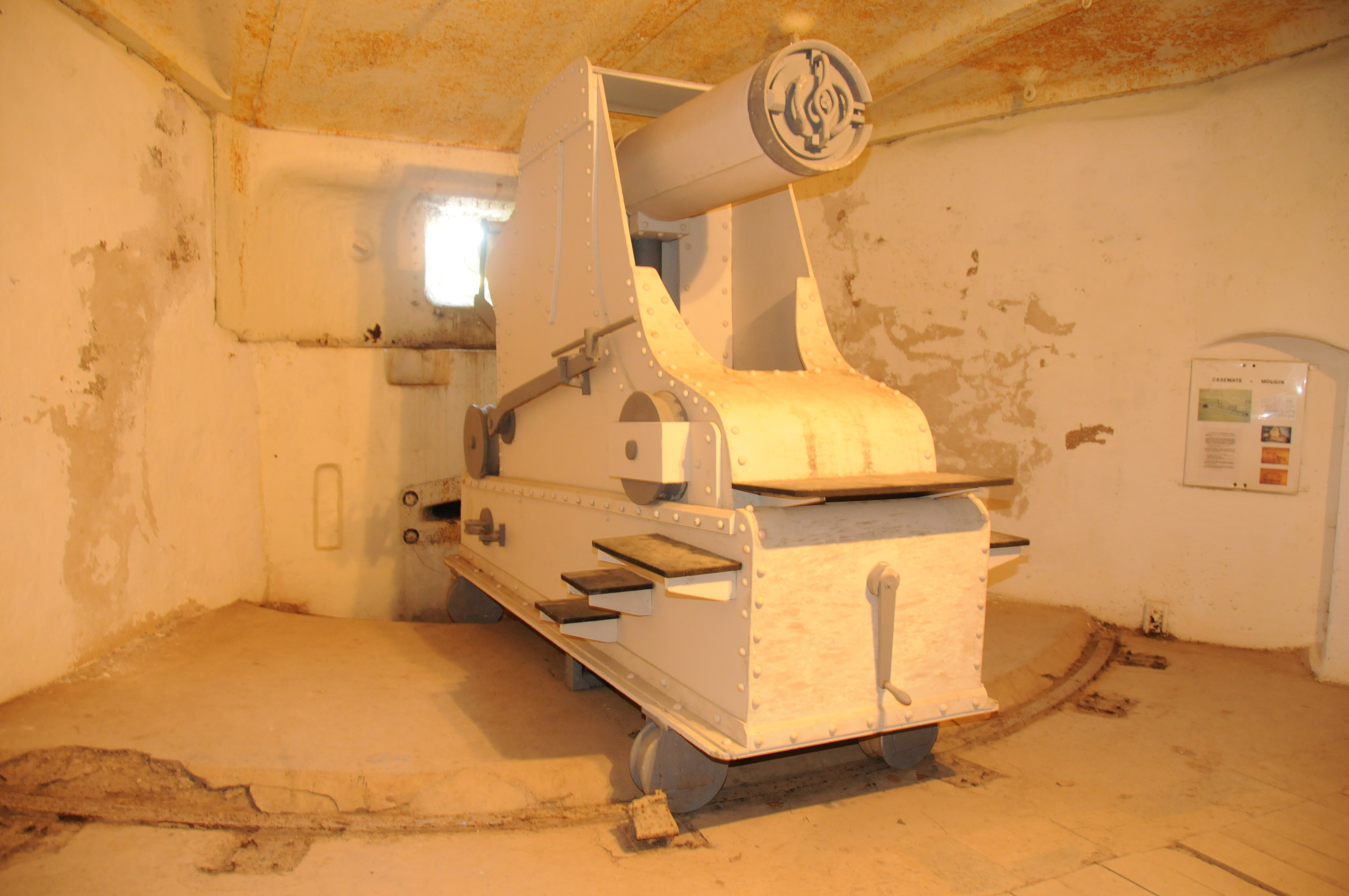
Replica of a Mougin casemate gun at the Fort du Mont Bart Photo: Bresson Thomas

The Mougin turret is a land-based revolving gun turret that housed some of the heaviest armament in French fortifications of the late 19th and early 20th centuries. While not reliably resistant to the explosive shells of opposing artillery, Mougin turrets remained active through 1940, when they engaged German and Italian forces during the Battle of France and the Italian invasion of France. The turrets were used at twenty-two forts of the Séré de Rivières system built in the 1870s.

The Mougin turret was named for its designer, Commandant Mougin, who developed the first turret in 1875. The turret consists of two 155 mm guns under a bowl-shaped armor shield, sunk into the ground and surrounded by a thick concrete apron that protected the multi-level traverse and loading facilities below. The turret is distinguished from naval turrets by the absence of protruding barrels. Two oval ports show just the muzzles of the guns. By contrast with naval practice, in which guns pivot in elevation on trunnions near their breeches, their muzzles and barrels protruding and moving in an arc, the Mougin turret's guns pivot at their muzzles, the barrel, gun carriage and breech ends rising and falling within the turret. This reduces the chances of enemy fire hitting the guns, a small risk on a moving ship, but significant for a fixed fortification. When the turret was under fire, it moved the gun apertures away from the incoming fire, returning fire while rotating without pausing, when contact was made on the correct target azimuth.

== Description ==
The visible portion of the turret was 6 metres (20 ft) in diameter, in cast and rolled iron of four segments 60 centimetres (24 in) thick, with a fifth casting forming the 20-centimetre-thick (7.9 in) top. The rotating gun and turret assembly weighed 160 tons, rotating on a circular rail around a hydraulically supported pivot. The movement of the turret initially required three teams of six men. After 1901 steam engines were installed to replace men. A full revolution took about two minutes, enough time to reload before the target azimuth was obtained again. Elevation varied from -5 degrees to +20 degrees.

Mougin guns had a maximum range of about 7,500 metres (24,600 ft). The guns themselves were made by de Bange. Twenty-five turrets were built at a cost of 205,000 francs each, primarily at Commentry near Montluçon.

=== Mougin casemate ===
A variant on the Mougin turret is the Mougin casemate, which employs the 155 mm Model 1877 gun on a hydraulic traversing carriage within an armored concrete casemate. The casemate has exceptionally low overhead clearance, resulting in a low profile above the ground. The gun can be traversed over a 60-degree arc, and can be elevated between −5 degrees and +20 degrees. This narrow range limits the gun to direct fire with a range of 7,100 metres (23,300 ft), as most indirect fire requires greater elevation. The firing port measures 40 centimetres (16 in) by 35 centimetres (14 in), and can be blocked with a thick counterweighted armored shield when not firing. An interlock prevents firing while the shield is in the way. The gun's muzzle remains behind the movable shield and is not visible from the outside.

The shielding around the firing chamber is a mixture of masonry, concrete, steel armor and earth shielding. The limited angle of fire, coupled with problems of noise and ventilation, limited installations to ten locations. None were ever fired in action, and most were removed for scrap by the Germans in 1943, or by the French Army after the war.

== Trials ==
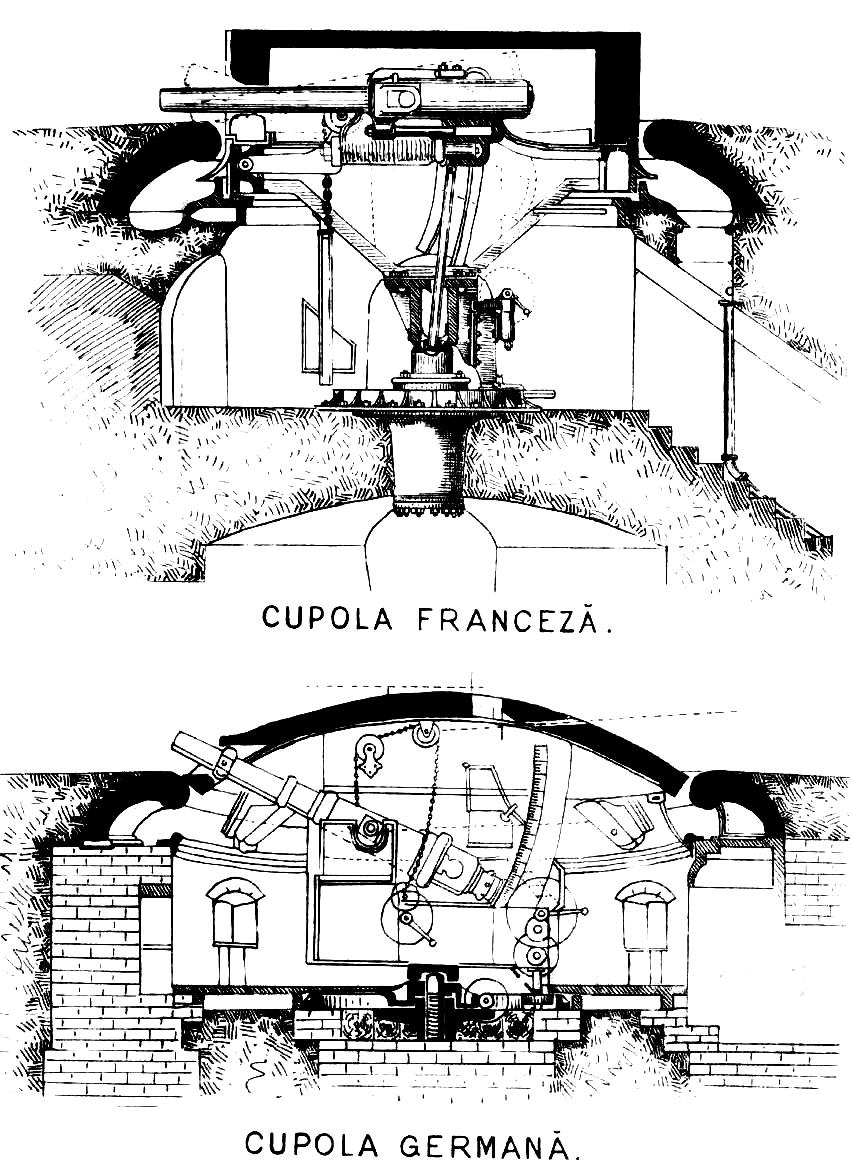
The Mougin turret (top) and its German counterpart, as used during the Cotroceni tests

A comparative evaluation between French Mougin turrets with de Bange guns and German Schumann-Gruson turrets with Krupp guns took place at Bucharest in 1883–84 under the supervision of Belgian General Henri Alexis Brialmont, who was then overseeing the design of the fortifications of Bucharest. The trials at Cotroceni revealed that the French turrets were more reliable, and had a higher rate of fire, but the German guns were more accurate. The French armor proved to be less durable under fire as well.

== Installations ==
The first two Mougin turrets were installed at the Fort de Giromagny on the eastern defensive curtain of France near Belfort.

Surviving Mougin turrets may be found at Fort de Saint-Cyr (guns missing), Fort de Villey-le-Sec, Fort de Vaujours (guns missing), Fort de Frouard, Fort de Liouville, Fort de Corbas, Fort Suchet (two turrets, one with guns, the other turret's guns removed to Villey-le-Sec), Fort de Domont (guns missing), and Fort de Stains (guns missing).

=== Casemates ===
Surviving Mougin casemates exist at Fort du Mont Bart (gun missing, replica in place), Fort de Condé-sur-Aisne (gun remains, training mechanism missing), Fort de Joux (two casemates, guns and mounts missing), Fort Tête de Chien (gun missing), Fort des Ayvelles (destroyed) and the Batterie de l'Eperon (two casemates, parts of the mounting remain).
