= Chonville-Malaumont =

- Commune
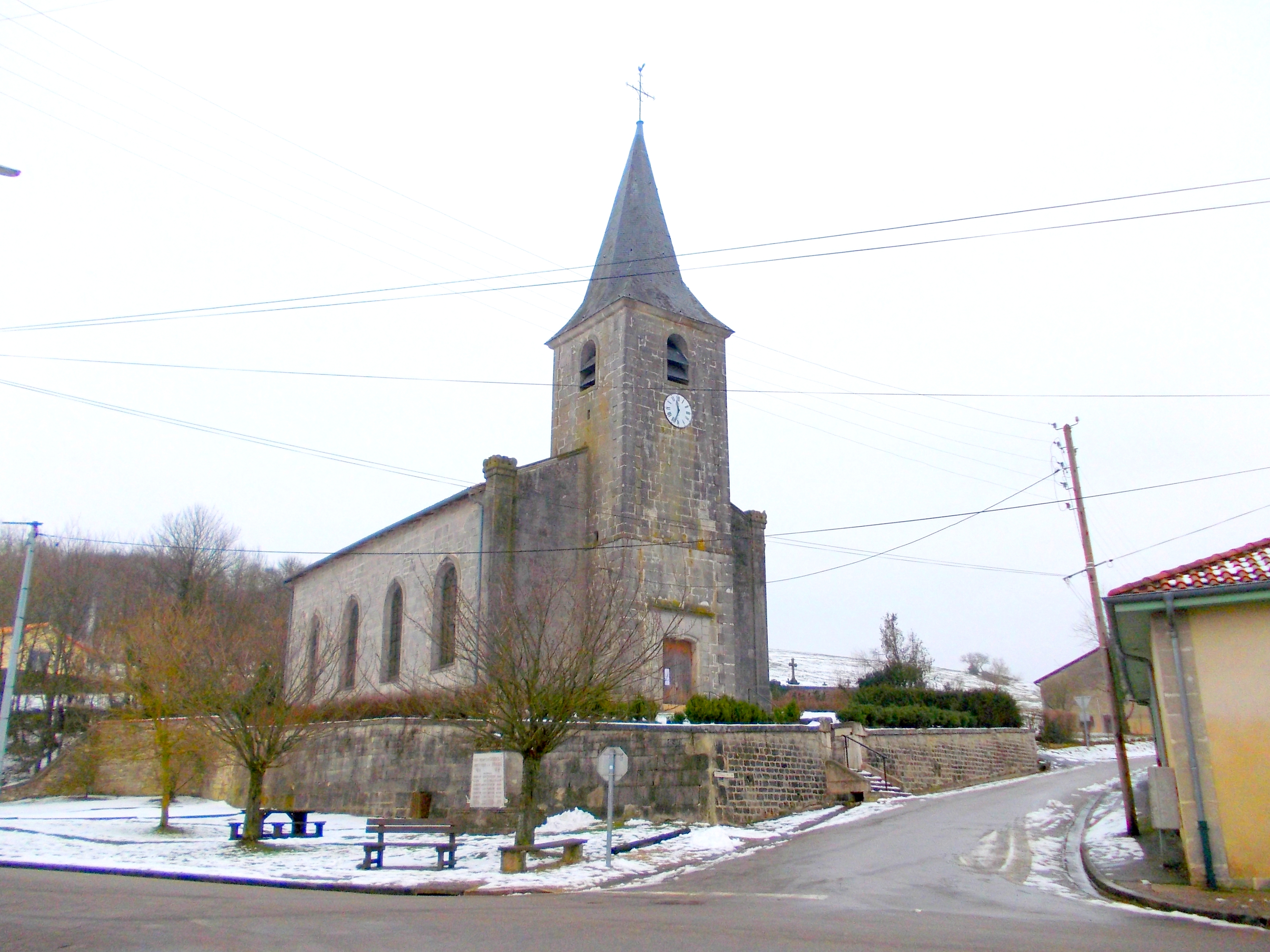
- The church in Chonville

- Coat of arms
- Location of Chonville-Malaumont
- Location within France Location within Grand Est
- Coordinates: 48°45′05″N 5°29′53″E
- Country: France
- Region: Grand Est
- Department: Meuse
- Arrondissement: Commercy
- Canton: Commercy

Government
  - Mayor (2020–2026): Stéphane Lebegue
- Area^{1}: 18.8 km^{2} (7.3 sq mi)
- Elevation: 303 m (994 ft)
- Highest elevation: 374 m (1,227 ft)
- Lowest elevation: 239 m (784 ft)
- Population (2023): 207
  - Density: 11.0/km^{2} (28.5/sq mi)
- Time zone: UTC+01:00 (CET)
  - Summer (DST): UTC+02:00 (CEST)
- INSEE/Postal code: 55114 /55200
- ^{1} French Land Register data, which excludes lakes, ponds, glaciers > 1 km^{2} (0.386 sq mi or 247 acres) and river estuaries.

Chonville-Malaumont (French pronunciation: [ʃɔ̃vil malomɔ̃]) is a commune in the Meuse department in Grand Est in north-eastern France.

== See also ==
- Communes of the Meuse department
