= Fort de Domont =

- Part of Fortifications of Paris, Séré de Rivières system
- Domont, France
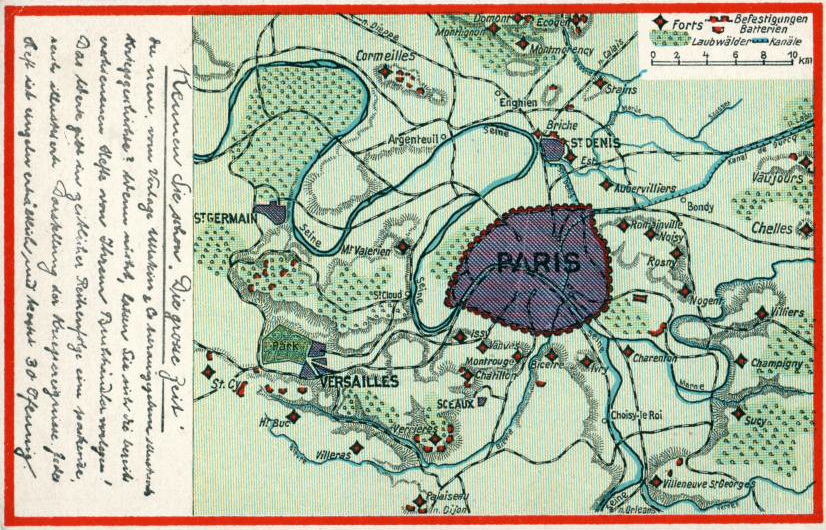
- German post card showing the fortifications of Paris

Site information
- Type: Fort
- Owner: French Ministry of the Interior
- Controlled by: France
- Open to the public: No

Location
- Coordinates: 49.01868°N 2.32217°E

Site history
- Built: 1874
- Materials: Stone, brick

The Fort de Domont was built following the Franco-Prussian War to defend Paris. Located to the north of Paris in Domont, the fort was part of an outer ring of fortifications built in response to improvements in the range and effectiveness of artillery since the construction of the Thiers fortifications of the 1840s. It was built between 1875 and 1879 in accordance with improved principles of fortification developed for the Séré de Rivières system. Work on the fort began in 1874 and were completed in 1878. The fort covered an area of 12 hectares (30 acres) and its garrison comprised 1175 men and officers.

The fort's artillery fire supported its neighbors, the Fort de Montmorency and the Fort de Montlignon. The pentagonal fort was entered through the south side, facing Paris. It featured a double caponier on the point facing outward, and two flanking caponiers on the east and west sides. The fort's main armament was a 155mm Mougin turret, added in 1884. Other artillery on the firing terrace, or cavalier, was of 120mm and 95mm caliber. The fort's artillery dominated the plains to the north, as well as the railway line to Pontoise.

On 3 and 4 September 1914, the fort fired on German scout parties in the vicinity of Luzarches, the only Parisian fortification to fire on Germans during World War I. The fort was occupied by German forces during World War II, who blew up the fort's ammunition stockpile before evacuating on 26 August 1944.

The fort was used by the French Post (PTT) as an ionospheric research station during the 1950s, followed by the Ministry of Agriculture. The fort was briefly used by a private company for radiography work in the 1990s before it became a training center for the fire services in 1993. It is now known as the Fort Domont Training Center ("Centre de Formation et d'entrainement, Fort de Domont"). The center provides comprehensive training, including live fire exercises

== See also ==
- Fortifications of Paris in the 19th and 20th centuries
