= Boncourt-sur-Meuse =

- Commune
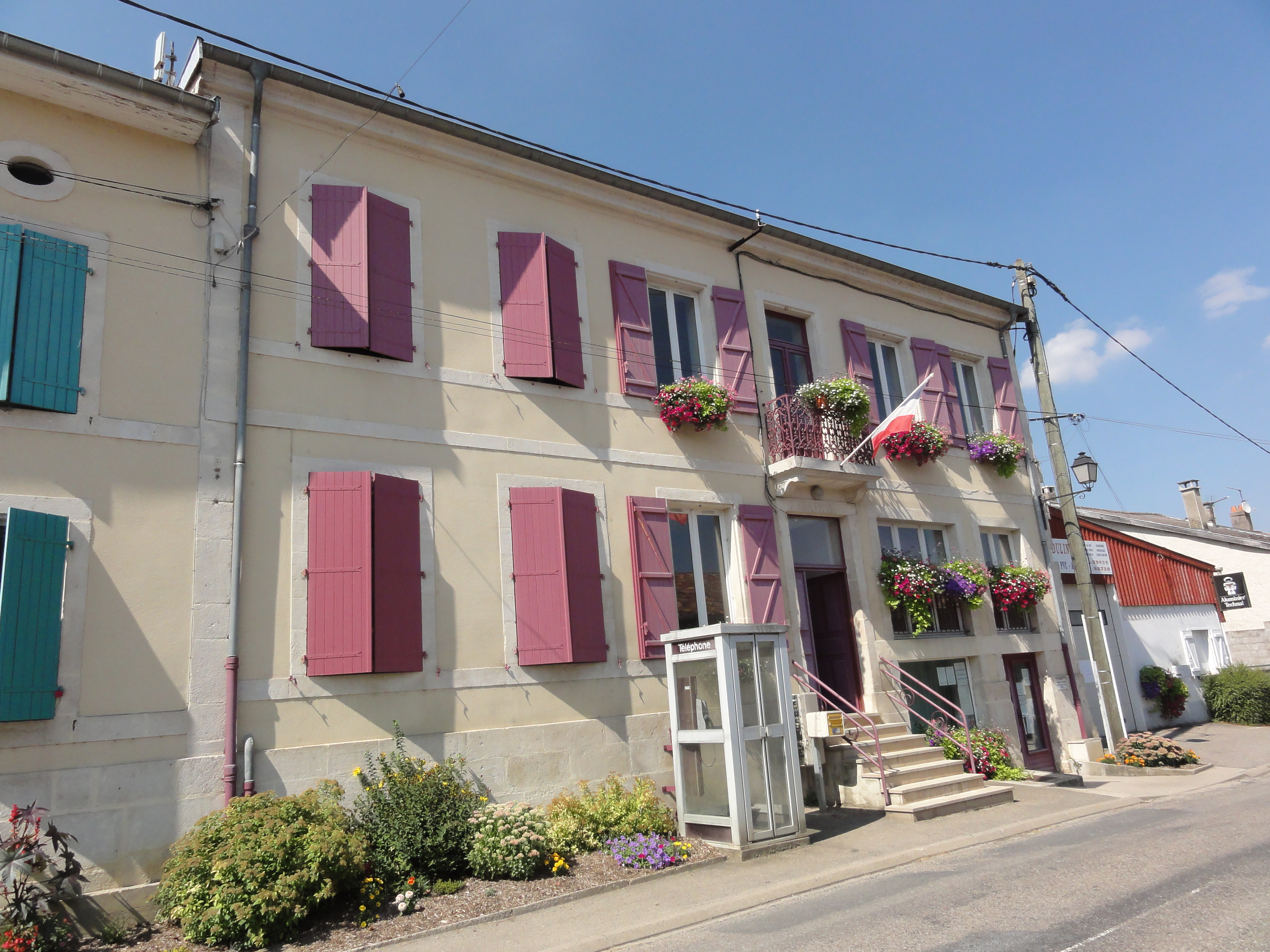
- The town hall in Boncourt-sur-Meuse

- Coat of arms
- Location of Boncourt-sur-Meuse
- Location within France Location within Grand Est
- Coordinates: 48°48′11″N 5°34′21″E
- Country: France
- Region: Grand Est
- Department: Meuse
- Arrondissement: Commercy
- Canton: Commercy

Government
  - Mayor (2020–2026): Philippe Lardé
- Area^{1}: 10.84 km^{2} (4.19 sq mi)
- Elevation: 240 m (790 ft)
- Highest elevation: 379 m (1,243 ft)
- Lowest elevation: 225 m (738 ft)
- Population (2023): 313
  - Density: 28.9/km^{2} (74.8/sq mi)
- Time zone: UTC+01:00 (CET)
  - Summer (DST): UTC+02:00 (CEST)
- INSEE/Postal code: 55058 /55200
- ^{1} French Land Register data, which excludes lakes, ponds, glaciers > 1 km^{2} (0.386 sq mi or 247 acres) and river estuaries.

Boncourt-sur-Meuse (French pronunciation: [bɔ̃kuʁ syʁ møz], literally Boncourt on Meuse) is a commune in the Meuse department in Grand Est in northeastern France.

== Population ==
Historical population
Year	Pop.	±% p.a.
1968	214	—
1975	226	+0.78%
1982	361	+6.92%
1990	370	+0.31%
1999	343	−0.84%
2007	340	−0.11%
2012	313	−1.64%
2017	328	+0.94%
2023	313	−0.78%
Source: INSEE

== See also ==
- Communes of the Meuse department
- Parc naturel régional de Lorraine
