= Euville =

- Commune
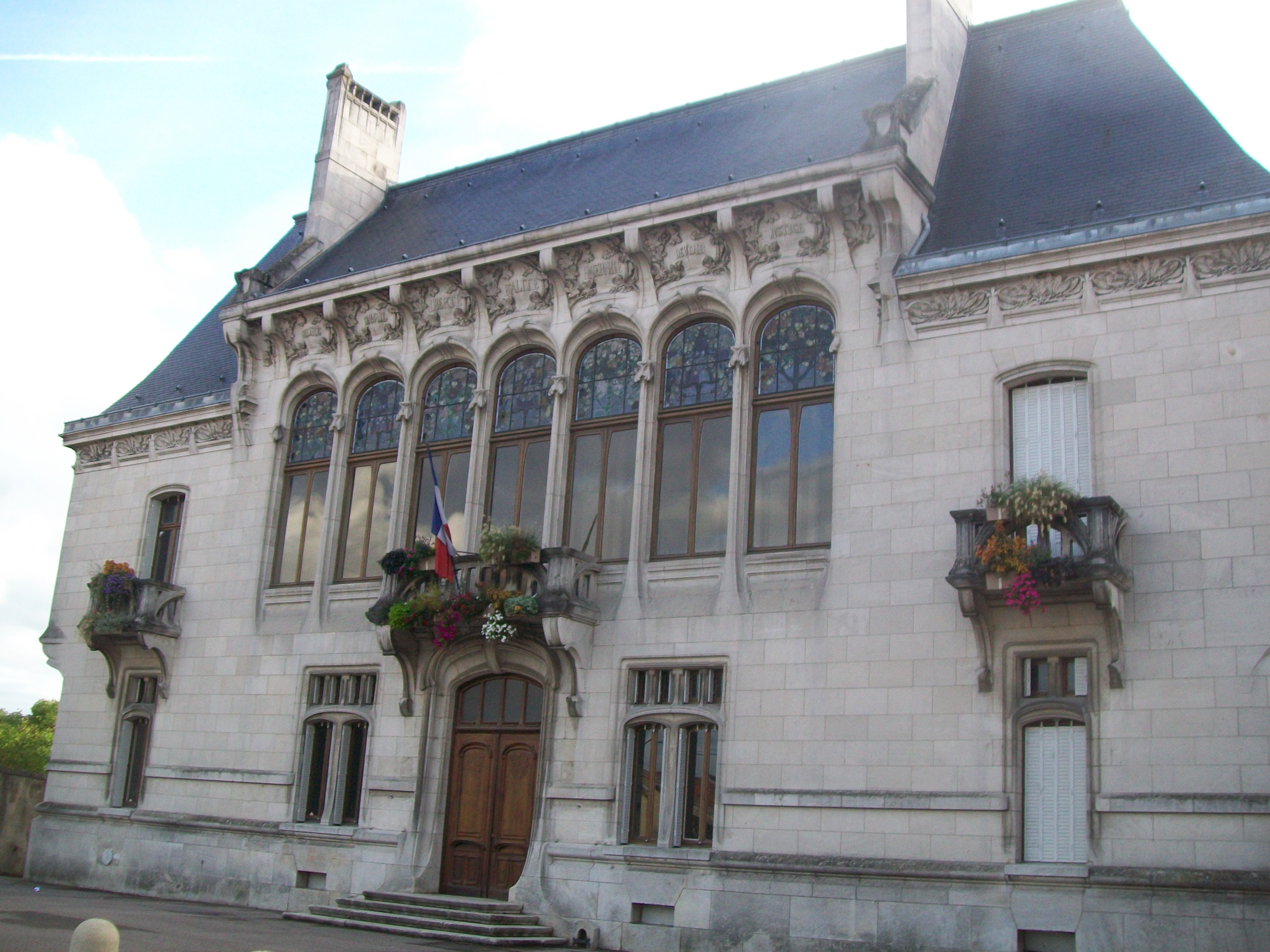
- The town hall in Euville

- Coat of arms
- Location of Euville
- Location within France Location within Grand Est
- Coordinates: 48°44′57″N 5°37′36″E
- Country: France
- Region: Grand Est
- Department: Meuse
- Arrondissement: Commercy
- Canton: Commercy

Government
  - Mayor (2020–2026): Alain Ferioli
- Area^{1}: 29.76 km^{2} (11.49 sq mi)
- Elevation: 232 m (761 ft)
- Highest elevation: 366 m (1,201 ft)
- Lowest elevation: 226 m (741 ft)
- Population (2023): 1,630
  - Density: 54.8/km^{2} (142/sq mi)
- Time zone: UTC+01:00 (CET)
  - Summer (DST): UTC+02:00 (CEST)
- INSEE/Postal code: 55184 /55200
- ^{1} French Land Register data, which excludes lakes, ponds, glaciers > 1 km^{2} (0.386 sq mi or 247 acres) and river estuaries.

Euville (French pronunciation: [øvil]) is a commune in the Meuse department in Grand Est in north-eastern France. In January 1973, it absorbed the former communes Aulnois-sous-Vertuzey, Vertuzey and Ville-Issey.

A famous product of the region is the Euville limestone, which is a high quality building material.

== See also ==
- Euville light railways
- Communes of the Meuse department
- Parc naturel régional de Lorraine
