= Fort de Villey-le-Sec =

- Part of Fortifications of Toul, Séré de Rivières system
- Villey-le-Sec, France
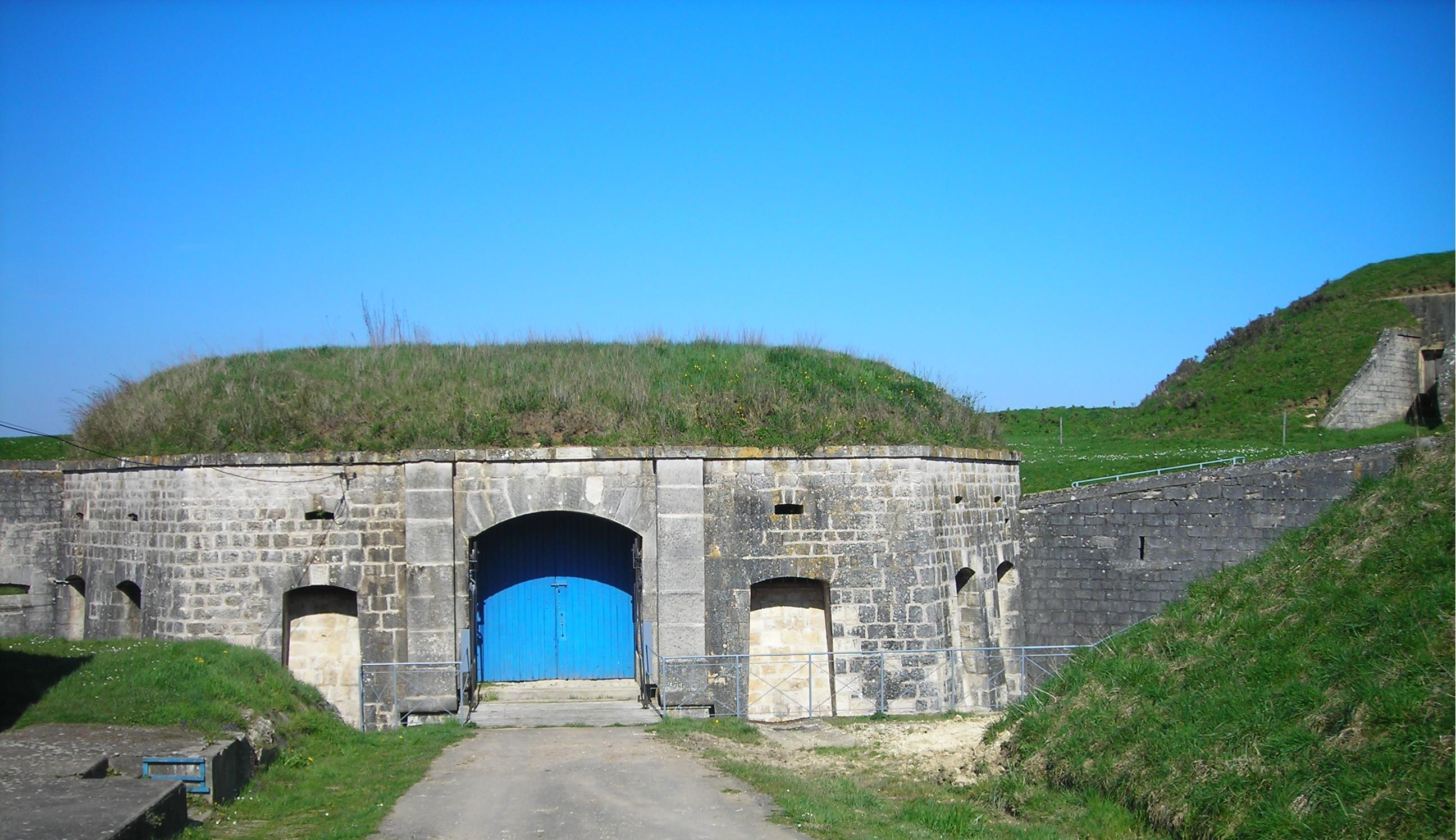

Site information
- Type: Fort
- Controlled by: France
- Open to the public: Yes

Site history
- Built: 1875

Garrison information
- Garrison: 1301

Fort de Villey-le-Sec, also known as Fort Trévise, is a fortification of the 19th century, built as part of the Séré de Rivières system of fortifications in Villey-le-Sec, France, one of the defenses of Toul. It is a unique example for its time of a defensive enclosure around a village. Conceived after the defeat of the Franco-Prussian War of 1870-71, the fort was located away from the main combat zone of World War I and has remained almost intact. The fort's preservation association has been at work since 1961 to restore and interpret the site. It has been included in the Inventory of Historic Sites and has been designated as a preserved natural area.

The Séré de Rivières was a response to the increasing power of explosive artillery, abandoning vertical masonry walls for more blended fortifications that served as artillery emplacements, defended by machine guns and small arms. The forts and batteries were designed to provide mutual support and to provide shelter and support for infantry units to maintain a defensive line, or cover for the assembly of larger offensive forces. In the 1880s, with the development of high explosives, much of the masonry construction of the forts became obsolete and was rebuilt using concrete and earth coverage.

== History ==
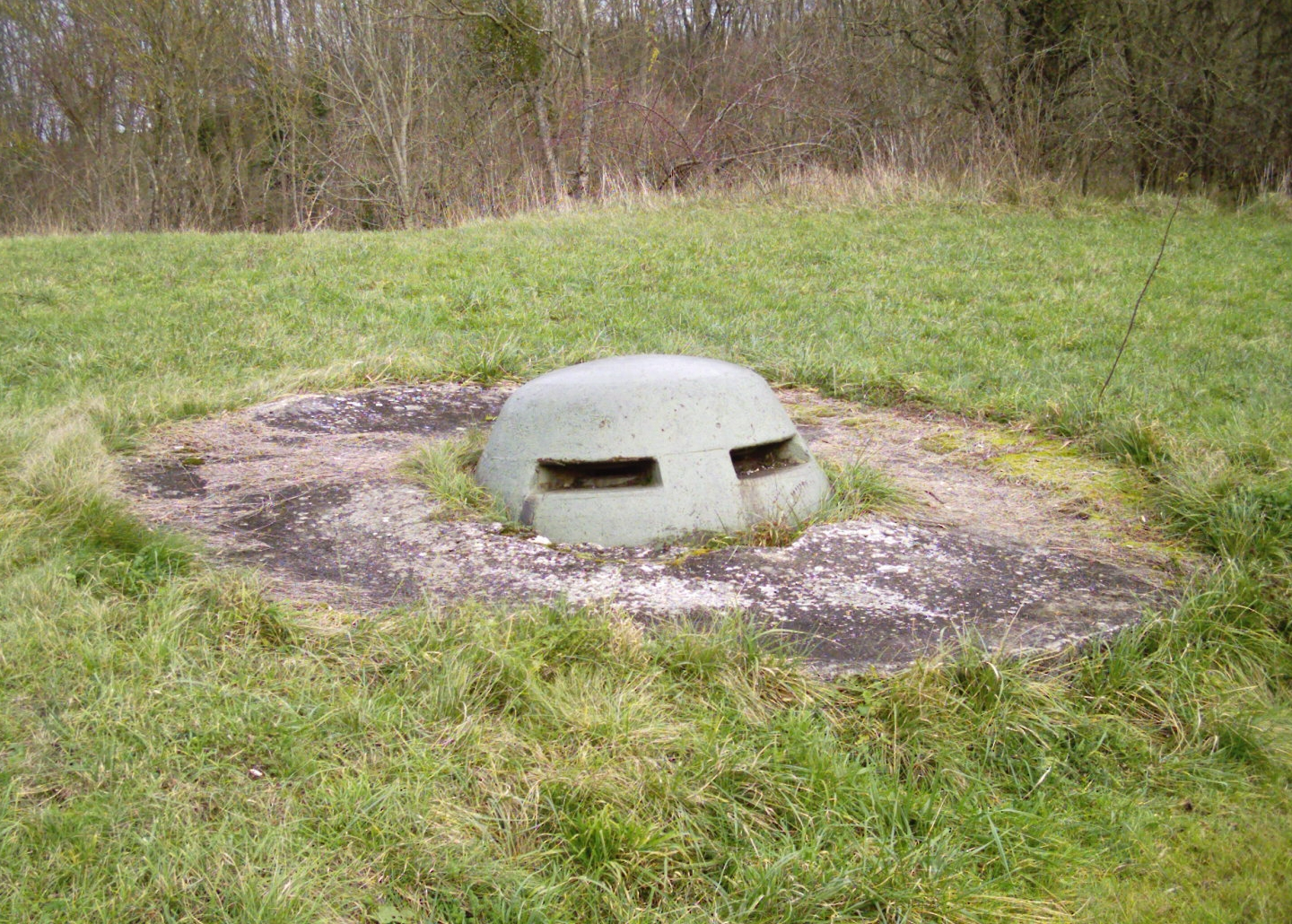
Artillery direction observatory

Fort Villey-le-Sec was built between 1875 and 1879, then modernized in 1888, 1903 and 1914.

=== Construction ===
The fortified camp of Toul anchors the end of the fortification curtain of the Hauts de Meuse. The 1874 Declaration of Public Utility that authorized construction envisioned four forts: Ecouvres, Dongermain, St.-Michel and Villey-le-Sec. Villey-le-Sec was planned to protect the southwestern approach to Toul, located on the plateau of Haye, supported on the south by the bluffs along the Moselle. The fort was originally planned to be about 1,000 metres (3,300 ft) further west, where the Chaudeney redoubt is located. The fort was responsible for the exits from the Forest of Haye, and to provide flanking support to the Fort de Gondreville and Fort de Chanot.

Design began 5 December 1873 and construction 26 July 1875. The work was carried out by Morel, and took four years with hundreds of workers. It was the most expensive fort of the region.

In 1885 the development of high-explosive shells made stone fortifications obsolete. It became necessary to reinforce the Fort de Villey-le-Sec with concrete and metal armor. At the same time the fort's artillery was judged to be vulnerable and was dispersed across the plateau.

In 1890 four barracks were built of concrete, as well as a redan and two batteries in the redoubt. About 1900 a firing range was created with the fort at Gondreville in the edge of the Forest of Haye, to test the fort's weapons. Another, in the Bois de l'Embanie, was used as a training area for s In 1912 work began to equip the fort with a battery of two Mougin turrets with 155 mm guns. This was interrupted by the First World War.

=== First World War ===
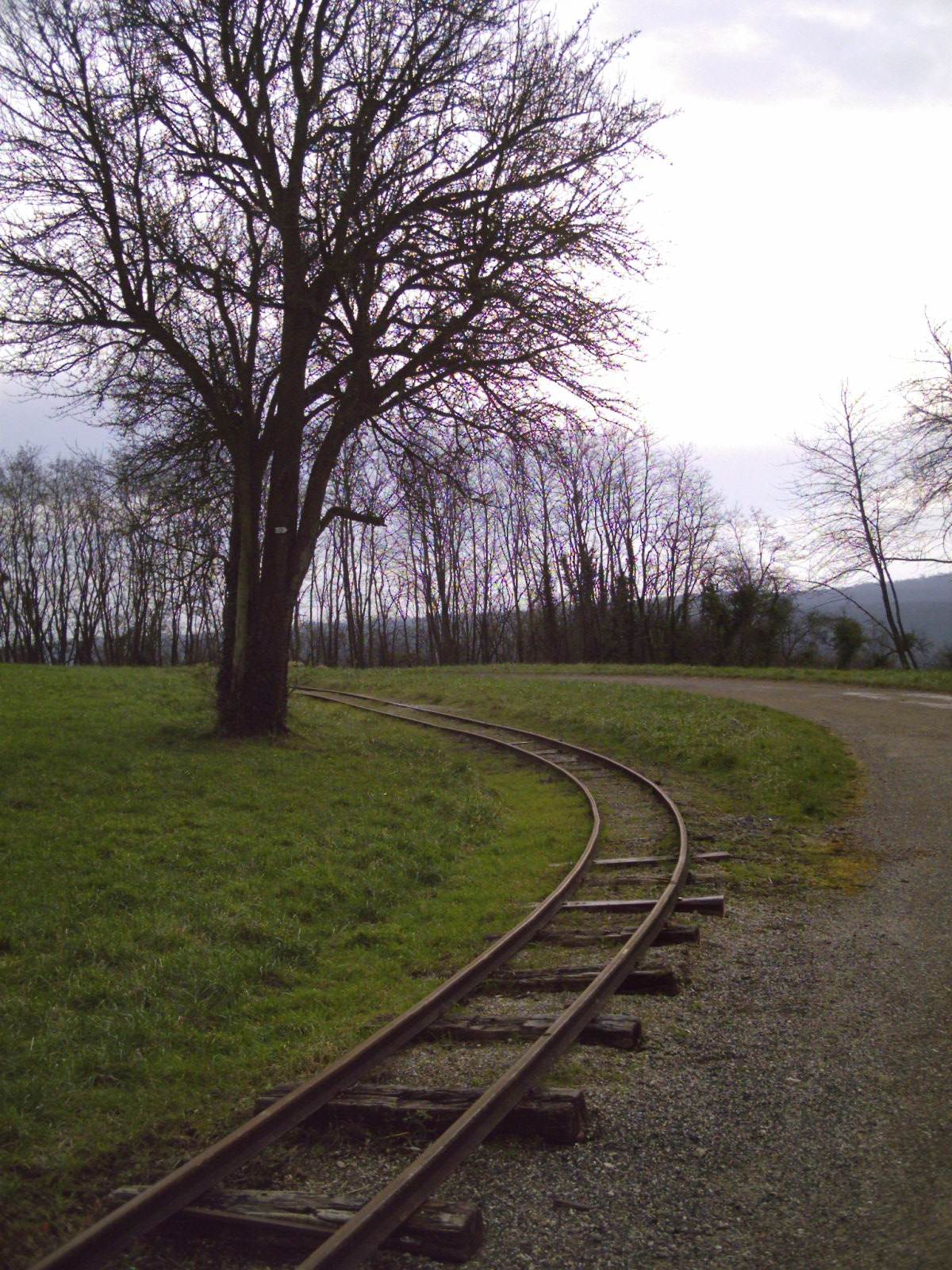
The military railway near the fort

At the beginning of the war, after the French defeat at Morhange, the German troops moved rapidly to the west. From mid-September, after the Battle of Grand Couronné at Nancy, the front was stabilized within a few tens of kilometers along an axis Saint-Mihiel - Pont-à-Mousson - Nomeny - Moncel-on-Pail - Arracourt. It will more hardly move in this sector. The population was evacuated, leaving only the garrison and the men who were essential to work the farms.

=== After the war ===
After the recovery of the Alsace-Moselle region, the fort lost its strategic interest. The army installed a small garrison, but was concerned with little more than maintenance. During the Second World War the fort's metal was stripped by the German army for scrap. The fort was bombarded by the Americans during the liberation of Toul. The 155mm guns of the Mougin turret were sent to Ouvrage Barbonnet, a Séré de Rivières fort in the Alps that had been modernized to function as part of the Alpine Line portion of the Maginot Line.

=== Present ===
An association has existed since 1961 to carry out restoration work on the fort. Portions were opened to the public in 1967 and the fort was listed on the inventory of historic structures in 1973. The Mougin turret and the north battery artillery have been restored to functional status. At present, the site is registered as a site pittoresque with tourism authorities, and is open from May to September. The preservation association uses Highland cattle to keep the vegetation on the 20-hectare (49-acre) surface of the fort under control.

== Main enclosure ==
Because the village already occupied the best site, the fort was built to limit the cost and difficulty in moving the occupants. The villagers were opposed to relocation because the village occupies one of the only places where water is retained at the ground's surface, due to the presence of a layer of clay.

=== Réduit ===
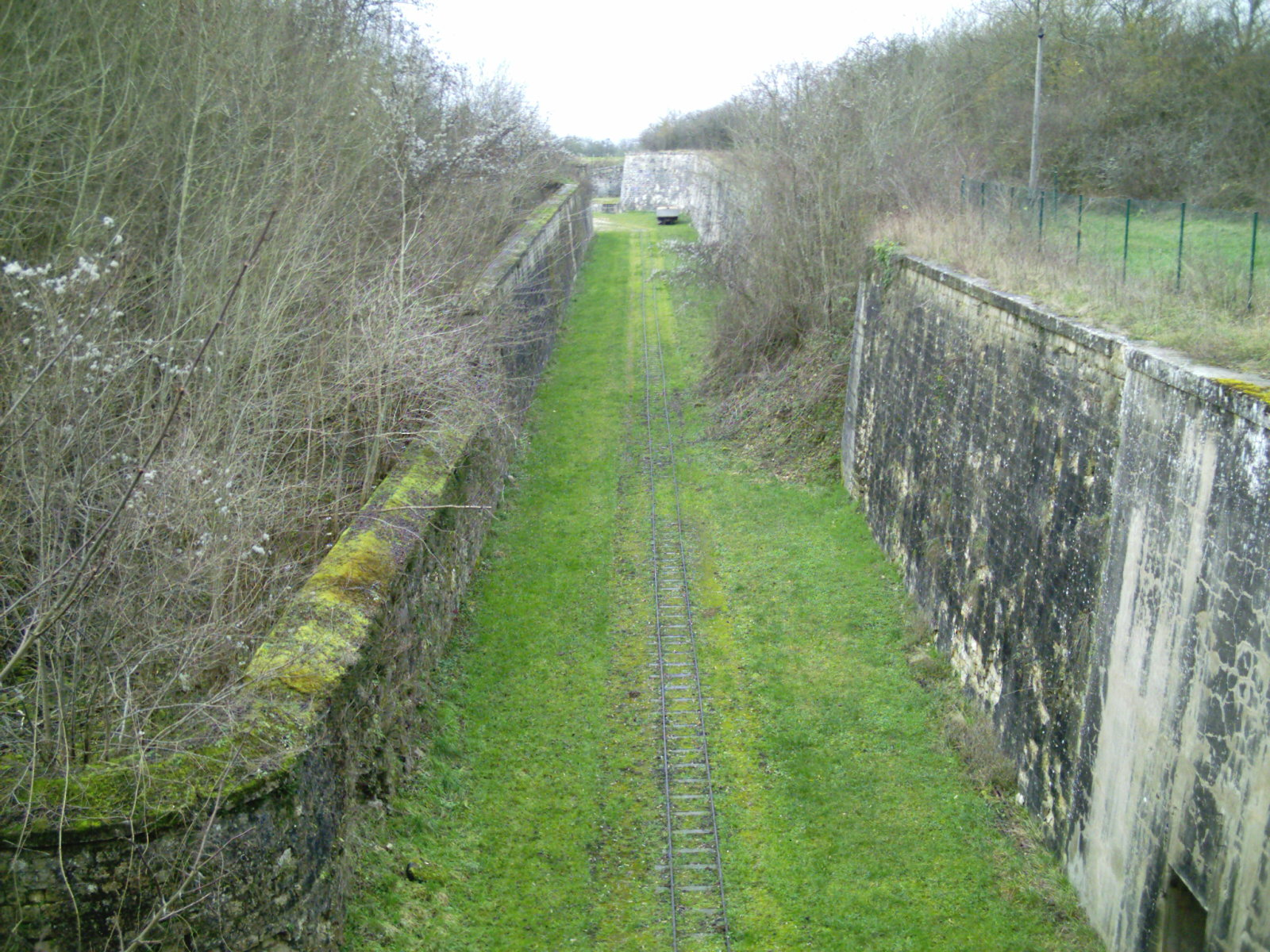
The fosse of the redoubt

The réduit comprises the principal fortification of Villey-le-Sec. Constructed at the southwestern angle of the village 48°39′29″N 5°58′26″E, the réduit (a rallying point or center of resistance) forms a square, 180 metres (590 ft) on each side. The réduit forms its own fort, concentrating together stores, quartering and ammunition magazines. Its plan is similar to the Fort de Lucey. However, its modernization was different and changed the fortification considerably. It is organized around a Mougin turret with two 155 mm guns, one of only two working Mougin turrets. The guns were returned from Fort Barbonnet, which had two turrets. Four rectangular courts constitute the original barracks. Two concrete-protected barracks were constructed, one in 1888 in a special concrete, the other in 1910 in reinforced concrete which forms the present entry to the réduit. In 1914 a battery to be armed with two 155mm turrets was under construction but never completed.

=== Redan ===
Situated between the north and south batteries 48°39′36″N 5°58′46″E on the opposite side of the village from the redoubt, the redan is equipped with a 75mm gun turret and two armored observatories. A concreted barracks was added in 1890 under the turret. The redan was overlooked by a water tower and the steeple of the village church, which were dynamited in 1914 to prevent the Germans from using them to sight artillery. The Germans never came close to Villey, and the church tower was rebuilt in 1950. A third observation point was added during the war. In 2002 the preservation association pumped w to 2.5 meters of water from the works, allowing access to the barracks and turret. Limited stabilization work was done, and the area awaits restoration. It is not presently accessible to the public.

=== North battery ===
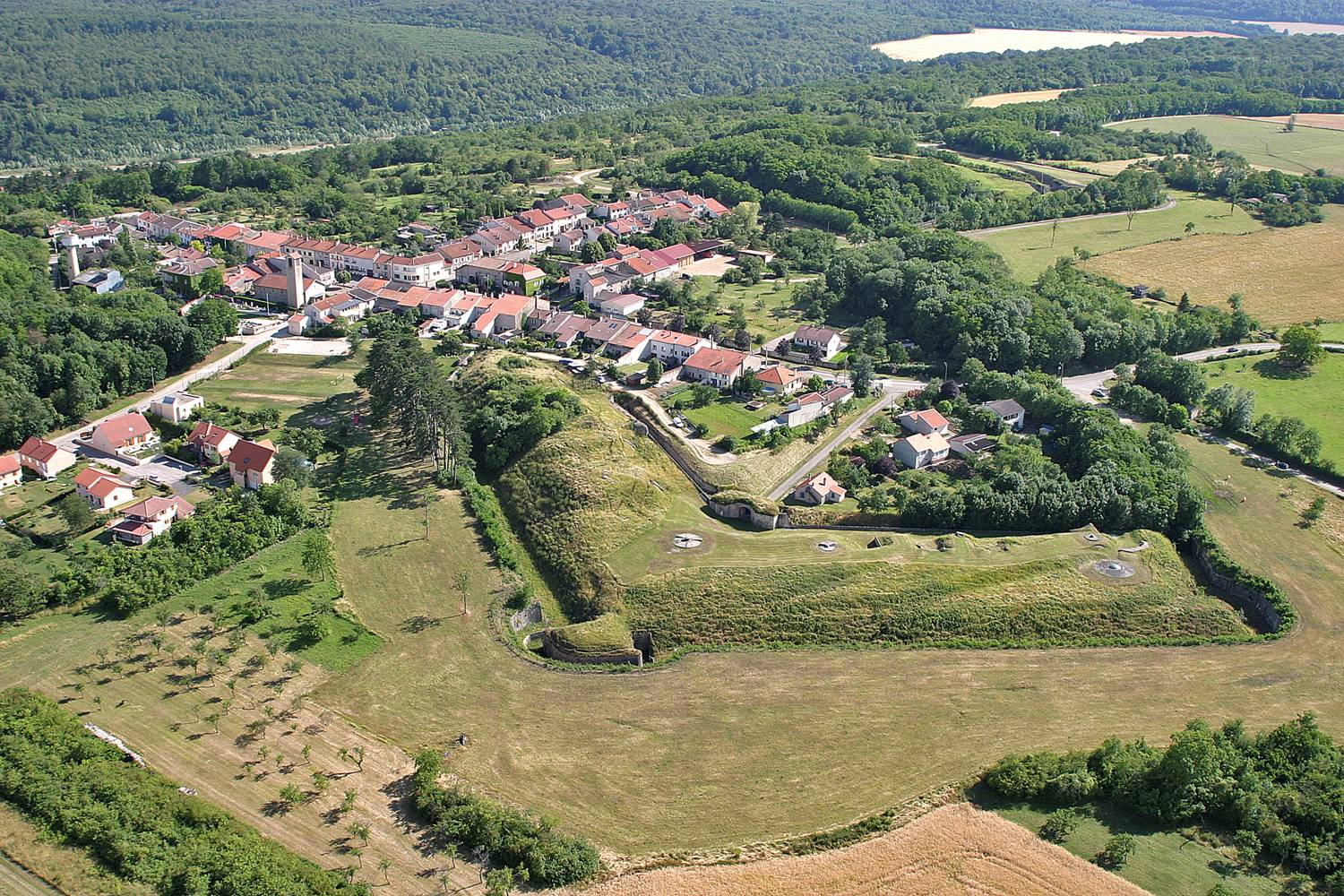
Aerial view of the north battery and village

The north battery is located just to the north of the village. In the form of a V with legs 160 metres (520 ft) long, it possessed a retractable 75mm gun turret and a machine gun turret, with two armored observatories. 48°39′43″N 5°58′38″E, 310 meters altitude. The battery controlled the plain. The entry was protected by an Ardagt et Pilter drawbridge. The position retains its double caponier. The restoration society has recovered the 75mm turret's guns from the ouvrage du Mordant and restored them so that they can fire blank rounds, along with the eclipsing action of the turret.

=== South battery ===
More imposing than the north battery, the south battery was planned to cover the Maron road, taking the valley of the Moselle in enfilade and facing the Bois l'Eveque. It lies to the southeast of the village. 48°39′27″N 5°58′47″E, 320 meters altitude. Like the north battery, the south battery was laid out in the form of a V. The south battery was not reinforced with concrete and retains its stone construction, with the exception of a concrete barracks added on the south side in 1890. It was planned to receive a 75mm gun, which was never installed. The entry was equipped with a rolling bridge by Th. Pilter that could be laterally displaced. The southern battery was used by the National School of Applied Geology and Mineral Exploration (École Nationale Supérieure de Géologie Appliquée et de Prospection Minière) in Nancy to store a radioactive mineral collection.

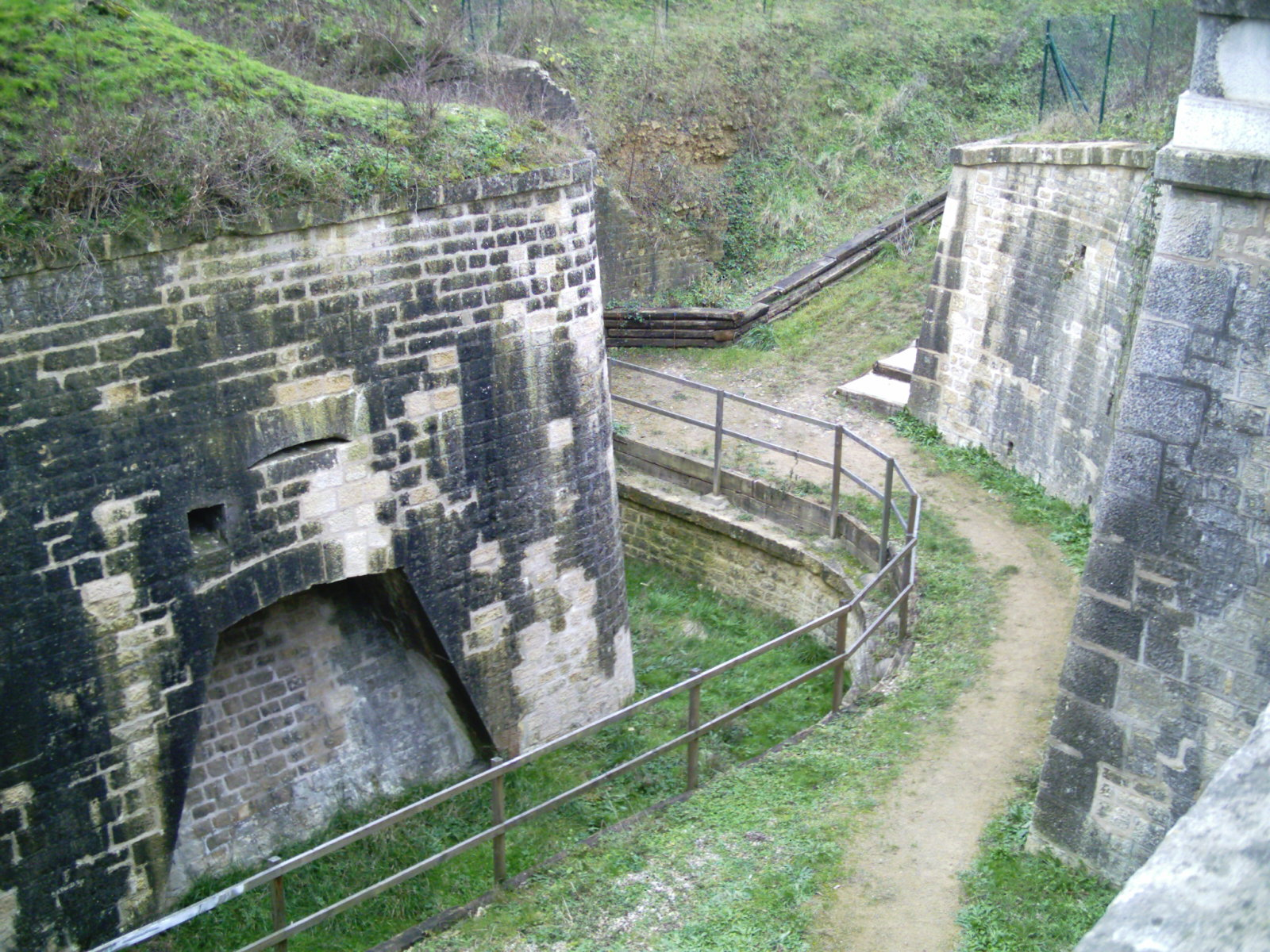
South battery

== Outer works ==
=== Redoute de Chaudeney ===
Also called the Charton redoubt, the Redoute de Chaudeney is located about one kilometer behind the fort at a location that could be used to bombard Toul. 48°39′28″N 5°57′33″E Its construction was initiated at the end of 1874 to anticipate delays in the construction of the main fort. Actual construction began in December 1875, predating the "panic" forts built after April–May 1875, when German chancellor Otto von Bismarck implied that Germany might initiate a pre-emptive war. The pentagonal position featured a Haxo casemate and a 164.7mm naval gun, protected by an earth rampart and masonry walls. The site is abandoned and covered with vegetation.

=== Batterie de Chaudeney ===
Four batteries were planned behind the redoubt 48°39′28″N 5°57′14″E, but only one was built, to the west in 1912. It was equipped with four 155mm guns. 500 metres (1,600 ft) to the southeast of the batteries, a magazine was constructed. The magazine is abandoned but accessible.

=== Powder magazine of Bois sous roche ===
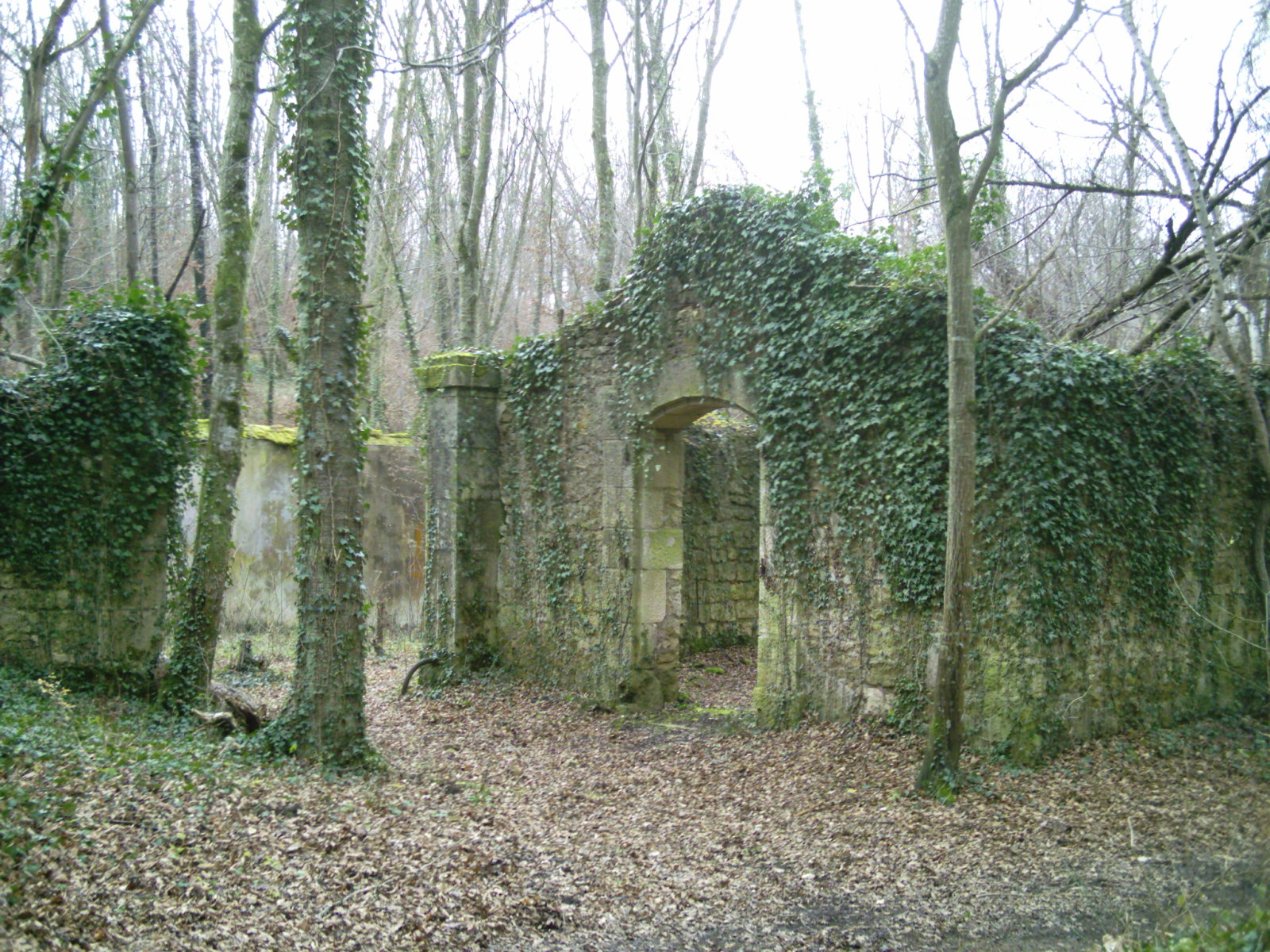
Buildings on the surface of the powder magazine

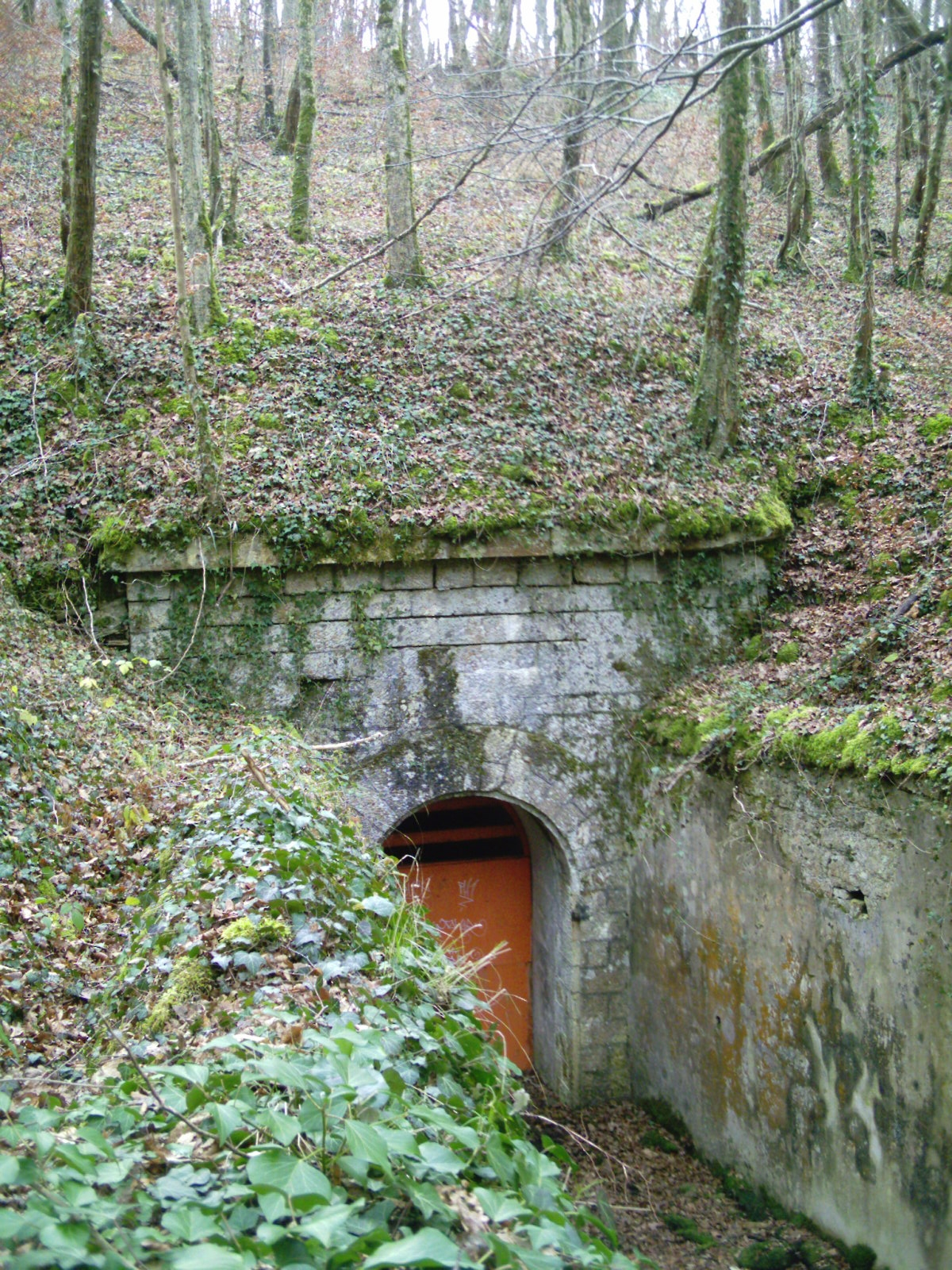
Access to the powder magazine

The powder magazine was located 1,800 metres (5,900 ft) to the southwest of the fort 48°39′0″N 5°57′10″E. Constructed in 1890-91, it was equipped with its own well (now dry). Today it is in ruins and shelters bats (Myotis myotis, Plecotus, and Whiskered bats), with a temperature and humidity suitable for their hibernation. It is therefore designated a nature preserve and is closed to access.

=== Batteries de Bois sous roche ===
A set of six batteries was planned along the way to the powder magazine from the fort 48°39′16″N 5°57′48″E. Only four were built to the west in 1888, totaling 24 positions for 120mm or 155mm guns. A raised position 100 metres (330 ft) behind the batteries shelters ammunition niches and conceals the 60 cm military railway from direct vision.

=== Advance post Ouvrage du Fays ===
A small infantry position 1,000 metres (3,300 ft) north of the fort. 48°40′17″N 5°58′34″E. Constructed by a Declaration of Public Utility of 23 August 1889, it was planned to be slightly modernized between 1907 and 1914.

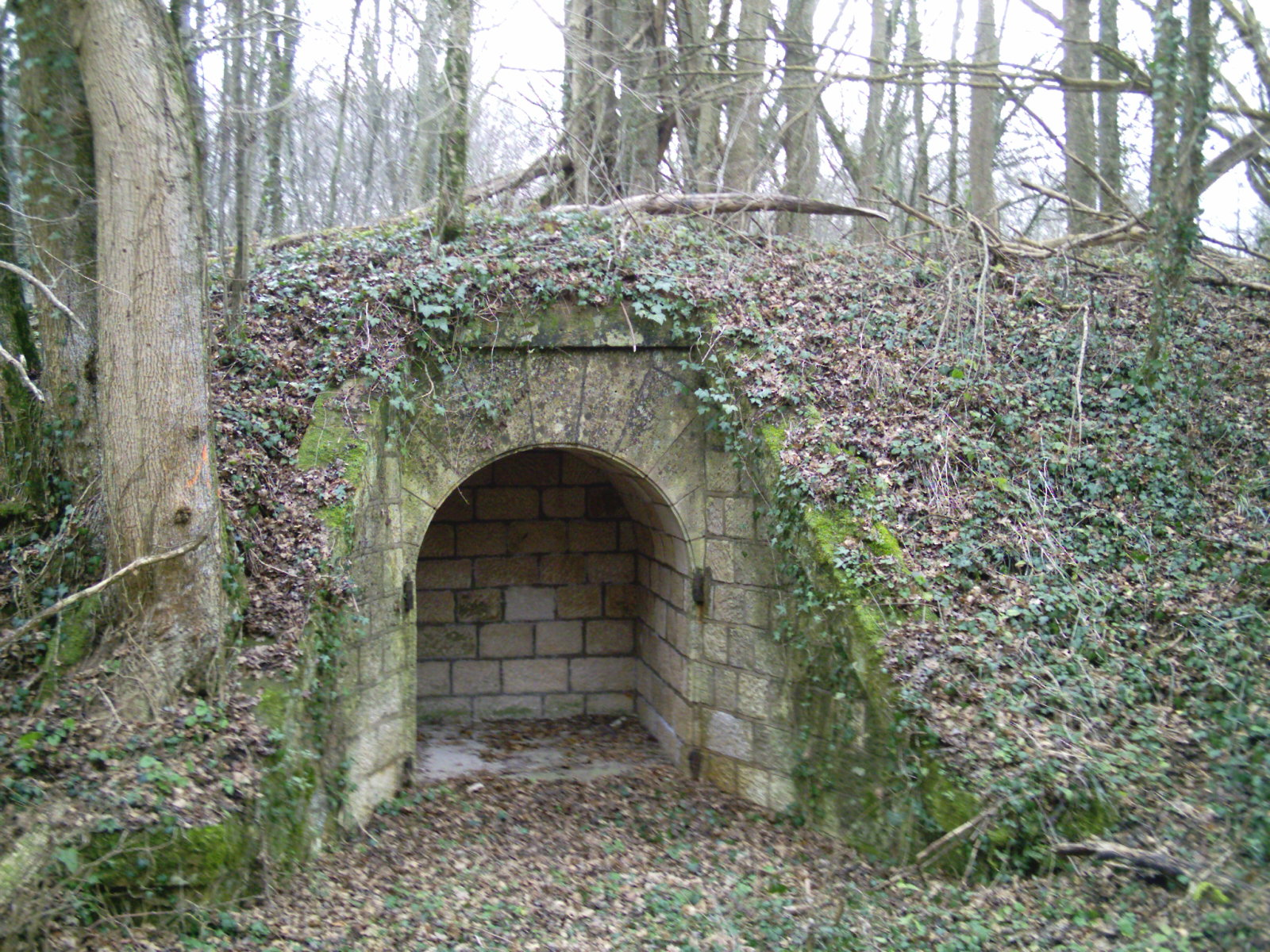
Artillery magazine in the protective slope for the 60cm rail line

=== Train line ===
A Péchot system rail line using a gauge of 600 mm (1 ft 11 5/8 in) was used to supply the fort. A Péchot wagon remains, along with several traces of the old line and the protective slope that shielded the line. The Villey-le-Sec military rail line was built between 1889 and 1891, with extensions in 1906 to the Redoubt of Chaudeney and in 1913-14 to the road between Villey-le-Sec and Gondreville. The preservation association has re-created a 1,500 metres (4,900 ft) section of the line for tourists.

=== Other works ===
Also located on the plateau are:

- The Redoubt of Dommartin (48°39′56″N 5°55′45″E)
- The Battery of Dommartin (48°39′56″N 5°57′5″E)
- The field work of Haut-des-Champs(48°41′1″N 5°58′11″E)
- The battery of Charmois (48°40′27″N 5°56′34″E)
- The Fort de Gondreville (48°40′58″N 5°56′21″E)
