= Grimaucourt-près-Sampigny =

- Commune
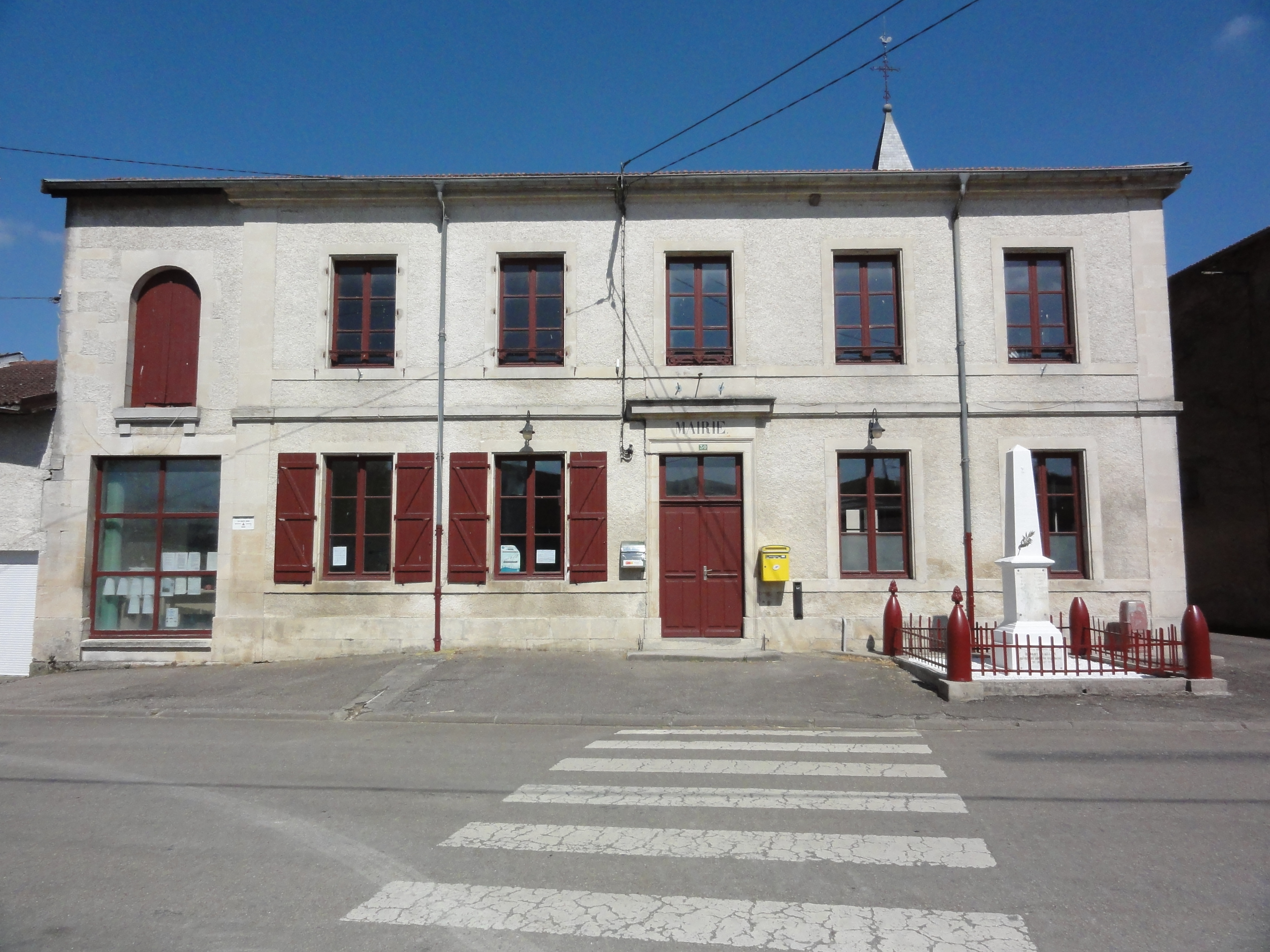
- The town hall in Grimaucourt-près-Sampigny

- Coat of arms
- Location of Grimaucourt-près-Sampigny
- Location within France Location within Grand Est
- Coordinates: 48°47′35″N 5°28′10″E
- Country: France
- Region: Grand Est
- Department: Meuse
- Arrondissement: Commercy
- Canton: Commercy

Government
  - Mayor (2020–2026): Jean-Charles Fillion
- Area^{1}: 9.27 km^{2} (3.58 sq mi)
- Elevation: 256 m (840 ft)
- Highest elevation: 368 m (1,207 ft)
- Lowest elevation: 236 m (774 ft)
- Population (2023): 95
  - Density: 10/km^{2} (27/sq mi)
- Time zone: UTC+01:00 (CET)
  - Summer (DST): UTC+02:00 (CEST)
- INSEE/Postal code: 55220 /55500
- ^{1} French Land Register data, which excludes lakes, ponds, glaciers > 1 km^{2} (0.386 sq mi or 247 acres) and river estuaries.

Grimaucourt-près-Sampigny (French pronunciation: [ɡʁimokuʁ pʁɛ sɑ̃piɲi], literally Grimaucourt near Sampigny) is a commune in the Meuse department in Grand Est in north-eastern France.

== See also ==
- Communes of the Meuse department
