= Fort de Montmorency =

- Part of Fortifications of Paris, Séré de Rivières system
- Montmorency, France
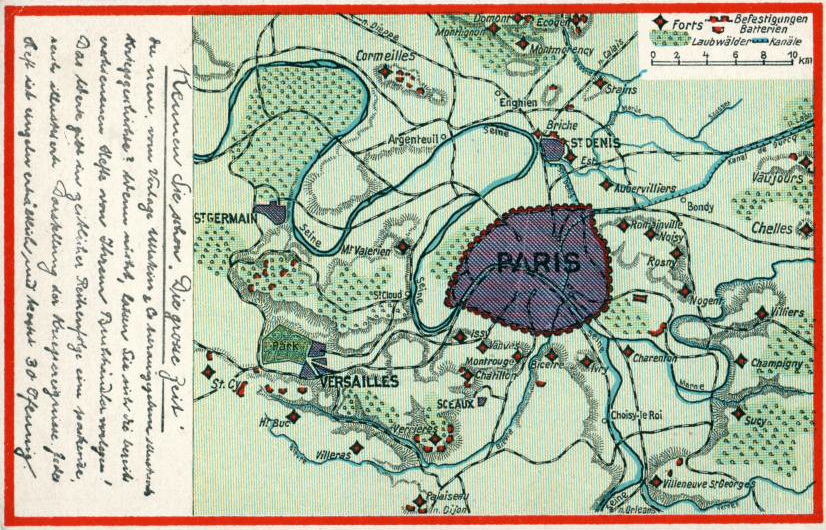
- German post card showing the fortifications of Paris

Site information
- Type: Fort
- Owner: French Air Force
- Controlled by: France
- Open to the public: No

Location
- Coordinates: 49.00017°N 2.32462°E

Site history
- Built: 1875
- Materials: Stone, brick

The Fort de Montmorency was built following the Franco-Prussian War to defend Paris. Located to the north of Paris in Montmorency, the fort was part of an outer ring of fortifications built in response to improvements in the range and effectiveness of artillery since the construction of the Thiers fortifications of the 1840s. It was built between 1875 and 1879 in accordance with improved principles of fortification developed for the Séré de Rivières system.

The fort defended its neighbors, the Fort de Domont and the Fort de Montlignon, as well as the town of Saint-Denis. The fort saw no action in the first or second world wars, but its prominent height made it ideal for use as a telecommunications relay station. In 1947 the French Air Force occupied the site, and by 1952 communication cables were installed to link the fort to the national air defense communications system. In 1956 the Fort de Montmorency became the national headquarters for Air Force communications. The fort was designated Base aerienne 285.

Base aerienne 285 was disbanded in 1968 and the fort was first placed under the jurisdiction of ''Base aerienne 104 at Le Bourget, and later under the control of the French Air Force hardened command center at Base aerienne 921 at Taverny, at the west end of the Montmorency forest. From 1992 the fort has served as a training center for security forces associated with the Taverny center, the Centre d'Initiation aux Techniques Commandos.

The fort remains occupied by the military and is not open to the public.

== See also ==
- Fortifications of Paris in the 19th and 20th centuries
