= Euville light railways =

Coordinates: 48.7700902°N 5.646414°E

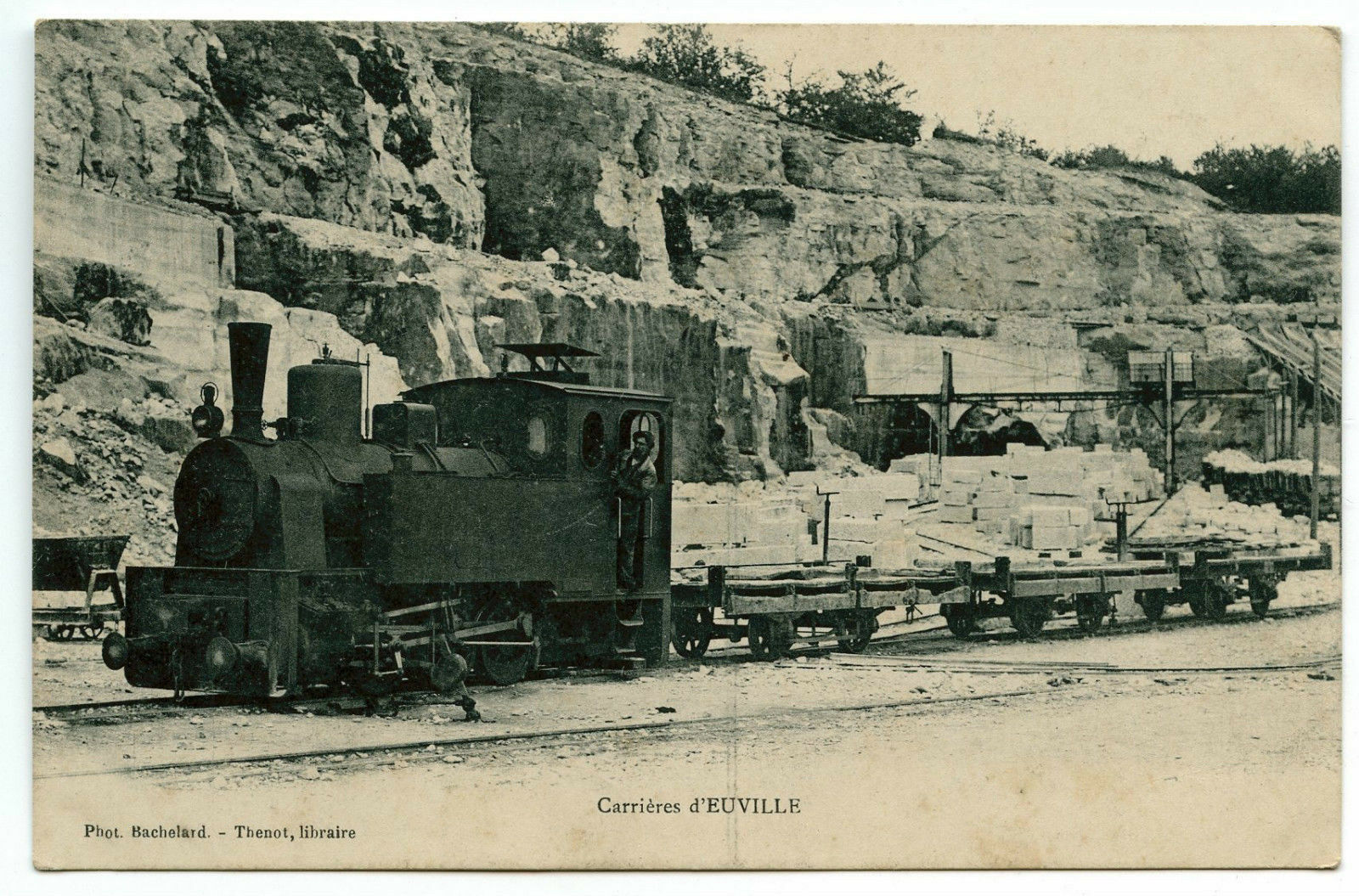
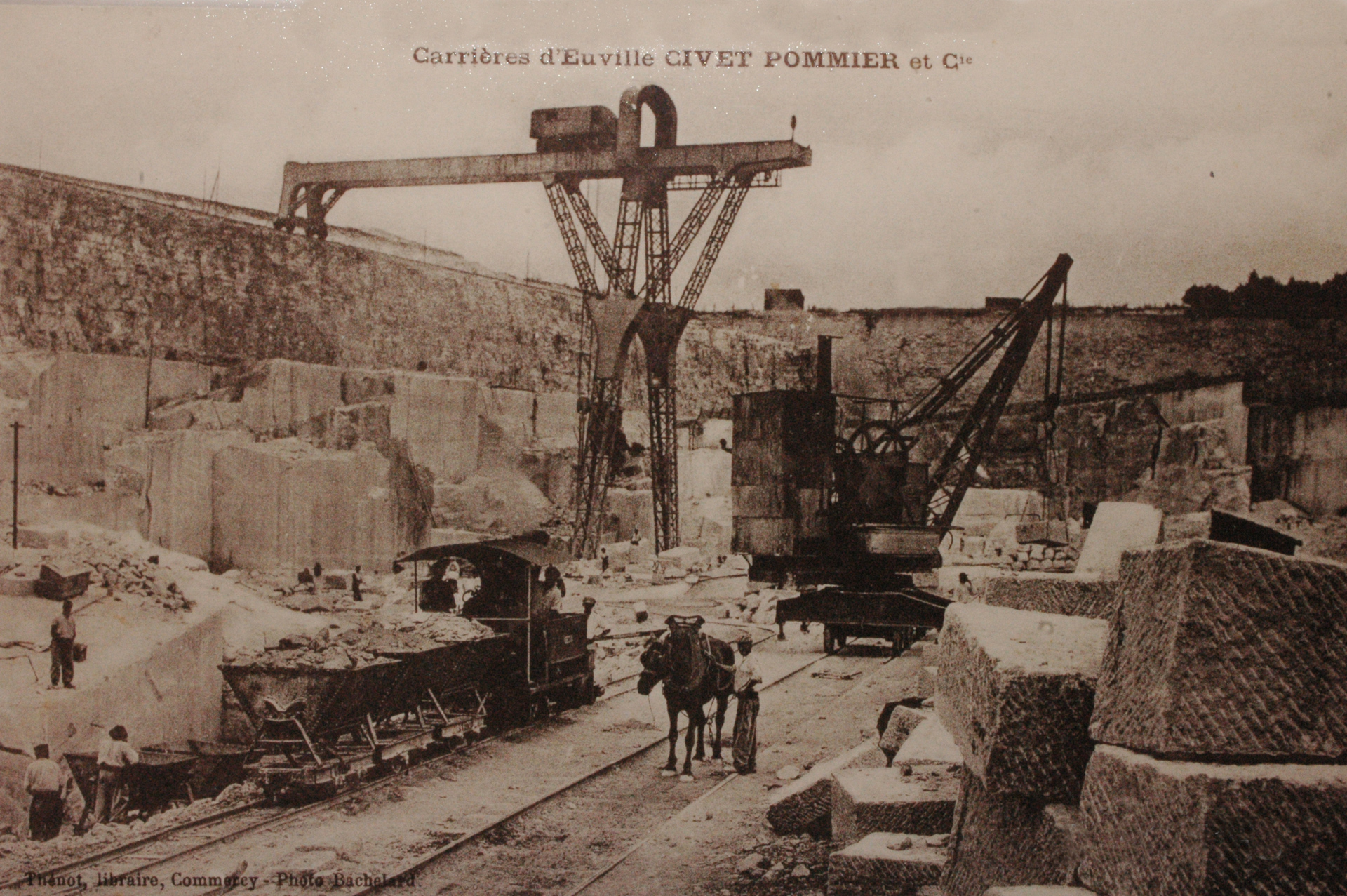
- Metre gauge light railway 600 mm gauge Decauville railway and broad gauge crane

Technical
- Line length: 8.8 km (5.47 mi)
- Track gauge: 600 mm (1 ft 11 5/8 in) and 1,000 mm (3 ft 3 3/8 in)
Route map
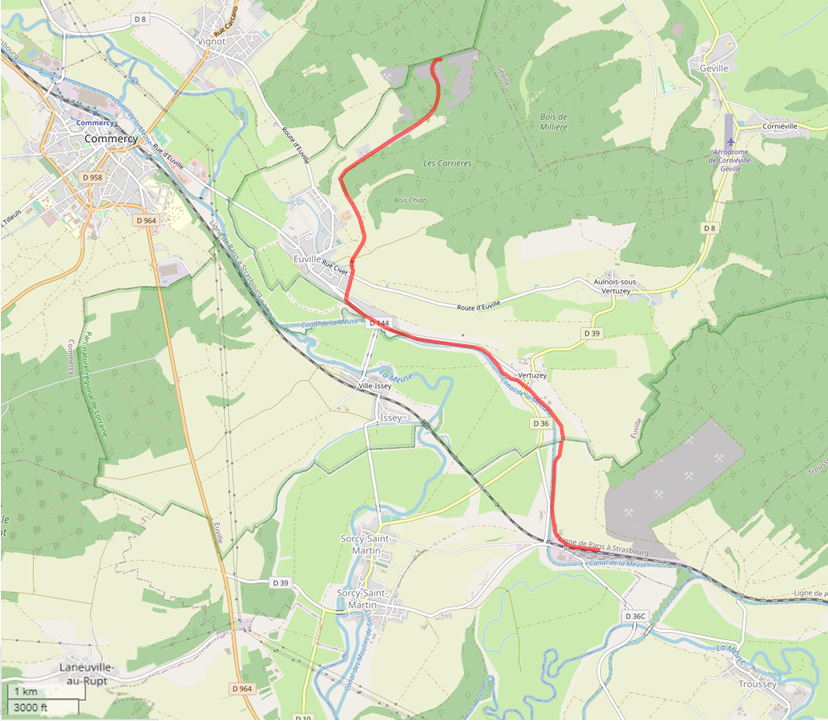

The Euville light railways (French: Réseaux des carrières Civet-Pommier & Cie et Fèvre & Cie) were an approximately 8.8 kilometres (5.5 mi) long light railway with a track gauge 1,000 mm (3 ft 3 3/8 in) and a narrow gauge with gauge of 600 mm (1 ft 11 5/8 in) near Euville in the département Meuse in the Grand Est region of France (until 2015 Lorraine).

== Operation ==
The so-called Tacot with a gauge of 1000 mm connected the quarries near Euville with a quai at the Canal de l'Est (today Canal de la Meuse) and the standard gauge railway station at Sorcy.

Workers, animals and a Decauville steam locomotive were used to push and pull the 600 mm gauge V-tip waggons in the quarries.
