= Fort du Mont Bart =

- Part of Fortified region of Lomont
- Bavans, France
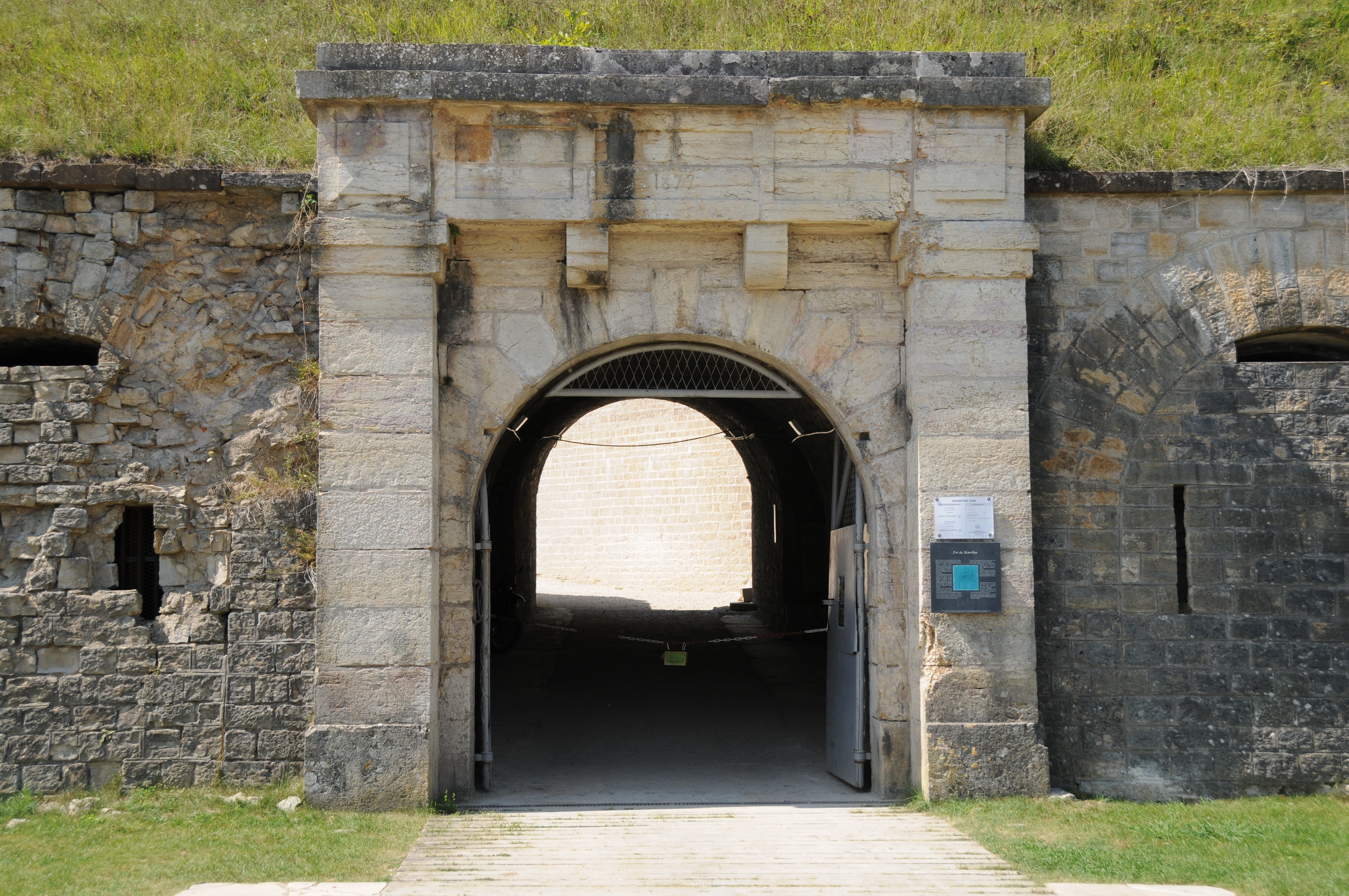
- Entry.

Site information
- Type: Fort, Séré de Rivières system
- Owner: Commune of the region of Montbéliard
- Controlled by: France
- Open to the public: yes
- Condition: Preserved

Location
- Coordinates: 47.48644°N 6.76163°E

Site history
- Built: 1874

Garrison information
- Occupants: 700

Fort du Mont Bart is located to the south of Montbéliard, France. It was built between November 1874 and July 1877 as part of the Séré de Rivières system of fortifications. The fort overlooks the valleys of the Doubs and the Allan at an elevation of 497 metres (1,631 ft), standing to the south and rear of the fortified region of Belfort and in control of the road to Besançon. The fort was intended to augment the Belfort fortifications and to prevent an enemy from bypassing them. The most striking feature of the Fort du Mont Bart is its "interior street", originally constructed in the open air as a sunken court, then covered before World War I with reinforced concrete.

== Strategic position ==
The strategic importance of the Belfort fortification system became apparent in the Franco-Prussian War of 1870, and increased as a result of the loss of Alsace and Lorraine as a result of the war. The defenses of France had to be reconsidered in light of the changes in France's frontiers and in view of advances in artillery during the second half of the 19th century. The new fort was planned to respond to these new developments and to support the neighboring fortification systems.

== Description ==
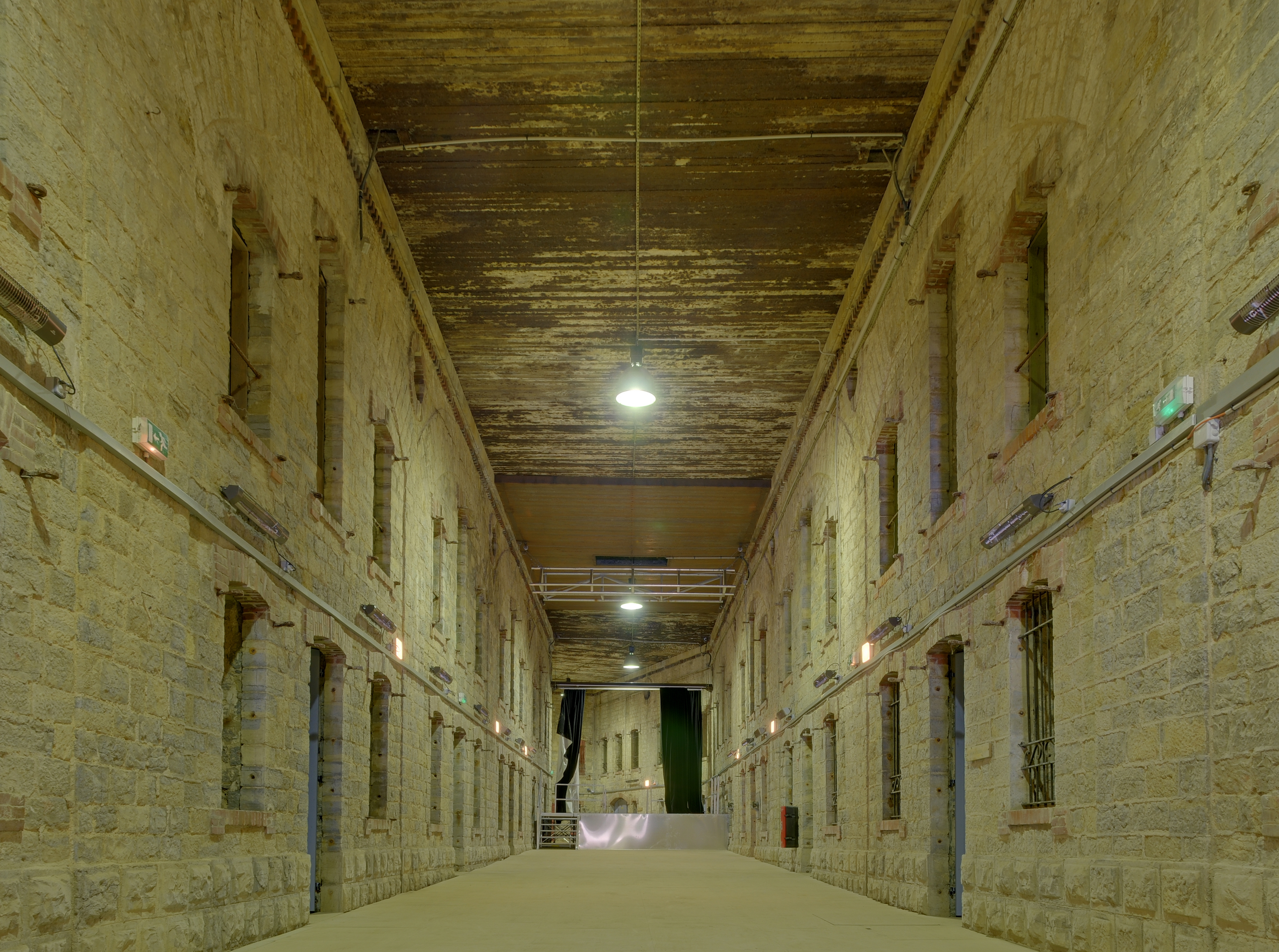
The central covered court

The pentagonal fort is surrounded by a ditch, which is traversed by fire from the caponiers. The central barracks is sunken into the earth and encircled by firing positions on the surface of the fort. The fort's surface was originally armed with four 155mm and five 120mm guns, with one 138mm gun. Four 220 mm mortars completed the exposed armament. Casemates were armed with one 155mm Mougin gun and four 138mm guns, with smaller arms defending the fort's walls, and a separate battery with four 95mm guns. By 1914 the surface armament had been augmented with four 90mm guns and an additional three 120mm guns. Revolving guns defended the fort. The fort was entered via a drawbridge.

Mont Bart covers a surface area of about 3.5 hectares (8.6 acres). The fort's stonework came from the Bavans quarry at the foot of the massif.

== History ==
The fort was modernized in 1889 with a magazine excavated within the rock of the foundations. In 1913-1914 the fort was reinforced with 1.65 metres (5.4 ft) of reinforced concrete over the central barracks and court, uniquely in the Séré de Rivières system. A second Mougin casemate was proposed in 1878, but never carried out.

In 1940 the fort was manned by troops of the 159th Position Artillery Regiment (RAP), part of the Defensive Sector of Montbéliard under the French 8th Army, Army Group 3. From 16 March 1940 the SD Montbéliard became the Fortified Sector of Montbéliard.

During the second world war the fort was stripped of its armament. It remained occupied by the military until the 1960s, when it was abandoned. It is now owned by the Montbéliard regional government and is under restoration.

== See also ==
- Fortified region of Belfort
