= Lérouville =

- Commune
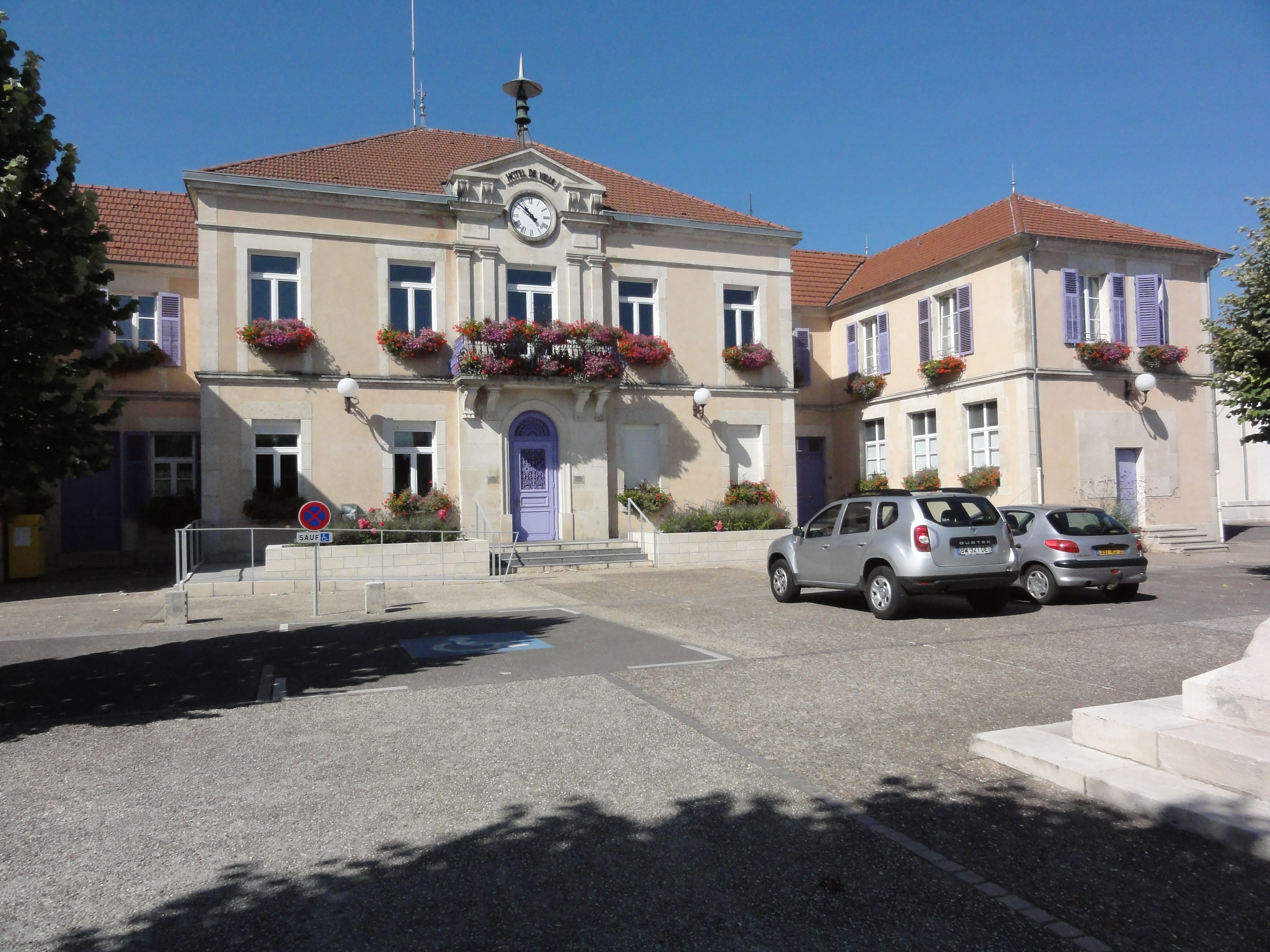
- The town hall in Lérouville

- Coat of arms
- Location of Lérouville
- Location within France Location within Grand Est
- Coordinates: 48°47′33″N 5°32′42″E
- Country: France
- Region: Grand Est
- Department: Meuse
- Arrondissement: Commercy
- Canton: Commercy

Government
  - Mayor (2020–2026): Alain Vizot
- Area^{1}: 14.38 km^{2} (5.55 sq mi)
- Elevation: 231 m (758 ft)
- Highest elevation: 372 m (1,220 ft)
- Lowest elevation: 225 m (738 ft)
- Population (2023): 1,358
  - Density: 94.44/km^{2} (244.6/sq mi)
- Time zone: UTC+01:00 (CET)
  - Summer (DST): UTC+02:00 (CEST)
- INSEE/Postal code: 55288 /55200
- ^{1} French Land Register data, which excludes lakes, ponds, glaciers > 1 km^{2} (0.386 sq mi or 247 acres) and river estuaries.

Lérouville (French pronunciation: [leʁuvil]) is a commune in the Meuse department in Grand Est in north-eastern France. The now-disused Carrière de Lérouville, or Lérouville Quarry, lies just outside the town. Its fifty-ton crane was the subject of a short write-up in the Scientific American Supplement of 12 August 1893.

== See also ==
- Communes of the Meuse department
