= Saint-Julien-sous-les-Côtes =

- Commune
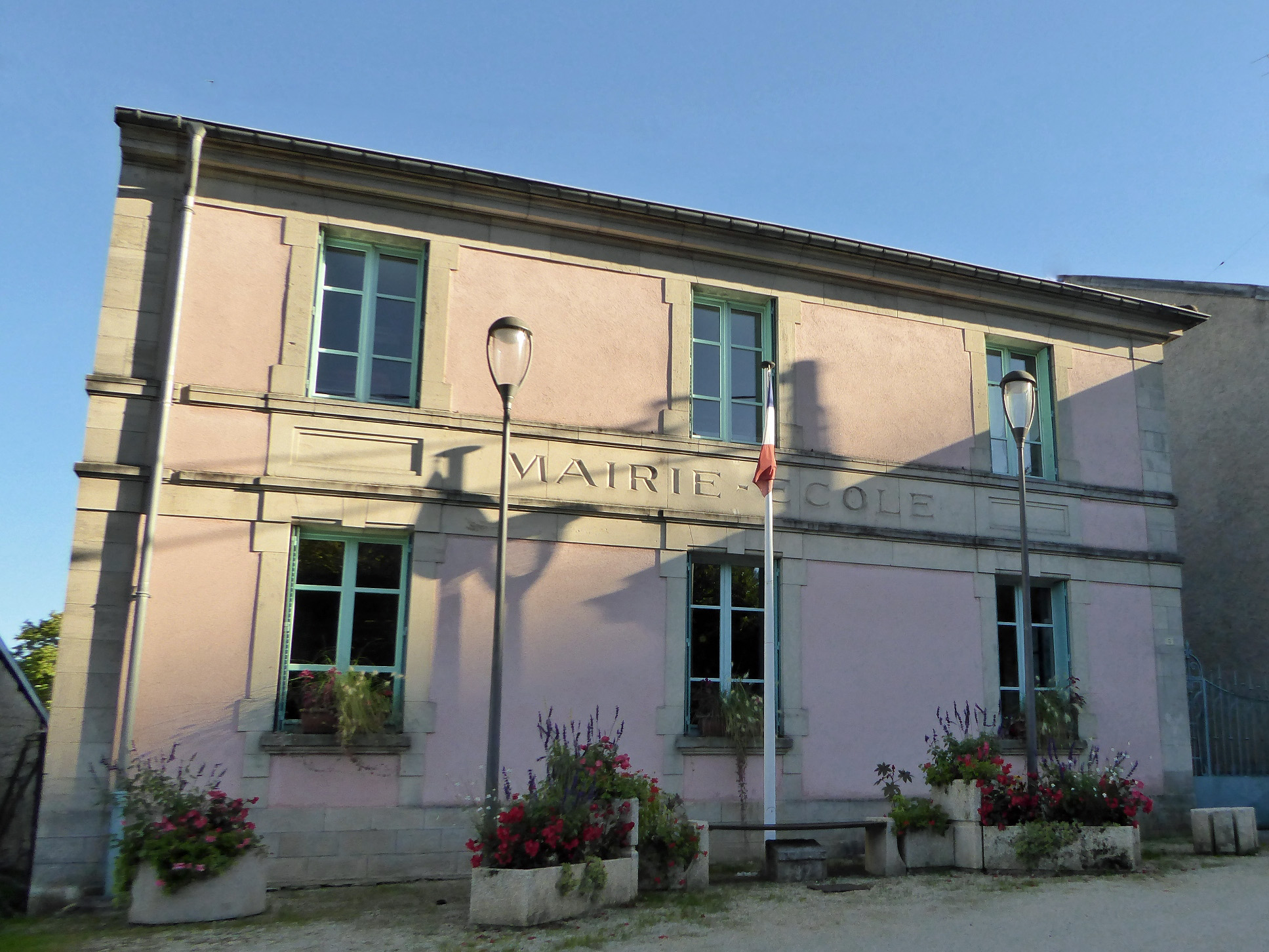
- Town hall

- Coat of arms
- Location of Saint-Julien-sous-les-Côtes
- Location within France Location within Grand Est
- Coordinates: 48°49′08″N 5°36′51″E
- Country: France
- Region: Grand Est
- Department: Meuse
- Arrondissement: Commercy
- Canton: Commercy
- Intercommunality: Côtes de Meuse Woëvre

Government
  - Mayor (2020–2026): Marie-Thérèse Preville
- Area^{1}: 4.95 km^{2} (1.91 sq mi)
- Elevation: 252 m (827 ft)
- Highest elevation: 373 m (1,224 ft)
- Lowest elevation: 239 m (784 ft)
- Population (2023): 138
  - Density: 27.9/km^{2} (72.2/sq mi)
- Time zone: UTC+01:00 (CET)
  - Summer (DST): UTC+02:00 (CEST)
- INSEE/Postal code: 55460 /55200
- ^{1} French Land Register data, which excludes lakes, ponds, glaciers > 1 km^{2} (0.386 sq mi or 247 acres) and river estuaries.

Saint-Julien-sous-les-Côtes (French pronunciation: [sɛ̃ ʒyljɛ̃ su le kot]) is a commune in the Meuse department in Grand Est in north-eastern France.

== See also ==
- Communes of the Meuse department
- Parc naturel régional de Lorraine
