= Rupt-en-Woëvre =

- Commune
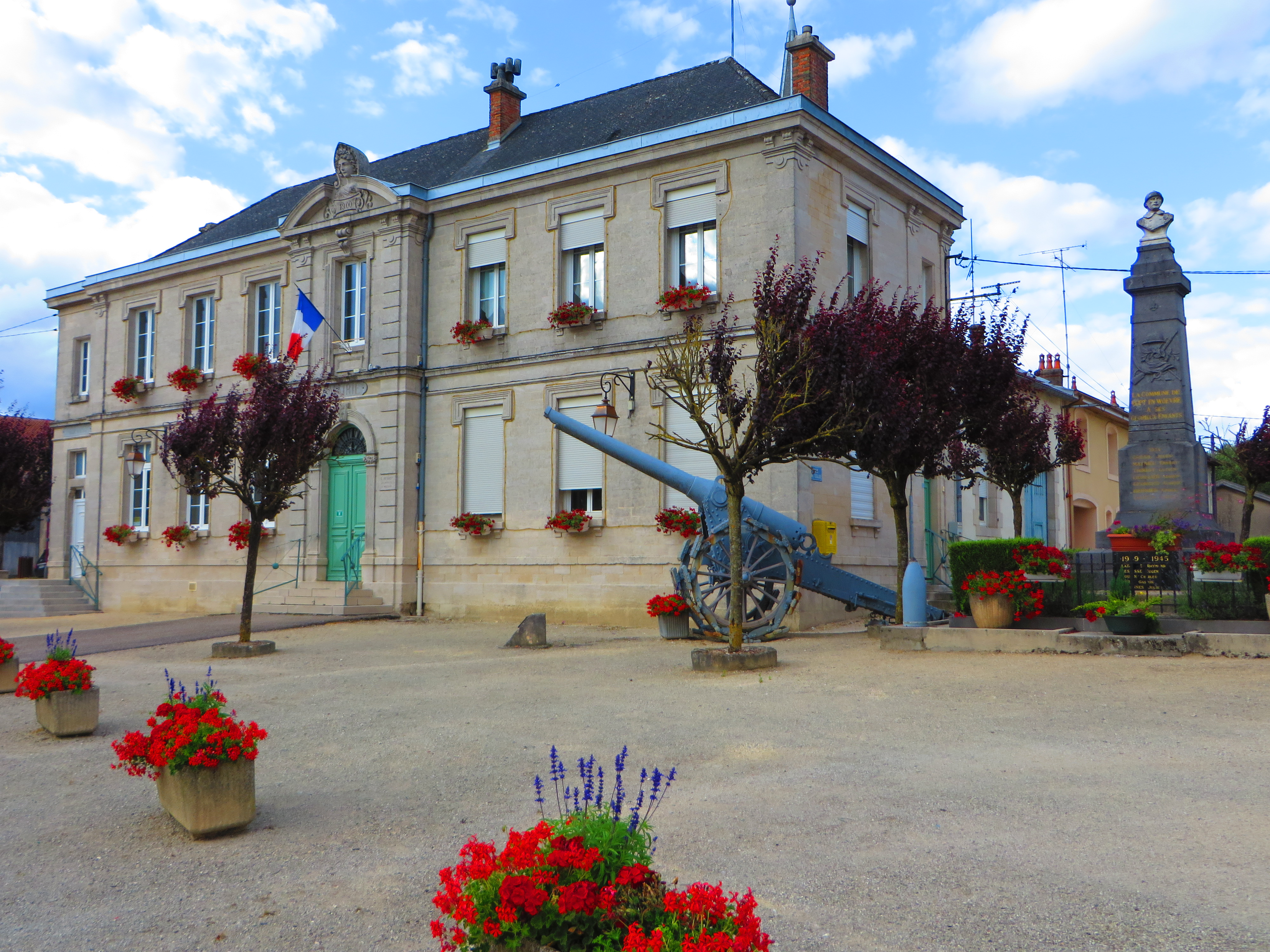
- The town hall in Rupt-en-Woëvre

- Coat of arms
- Location of Rupt-en-Woëvre
- Location within France Location within Grand Est
- Coordinates: 49°03′11″N 5°29′20″E
- Country: France
- Region: Grand Est
- Department: Meuse
- Arrondissement: Verdun
- Canton: Dieue-sur-Meuse

Government
  - Mayor (2020–2026): Marc Champlon
- Area^{1}: 17.05 km^{2} (6.58 sq mi)
- Elevation: 245 m (804 ft)
- Highest elevation: 393 m (1,289 ft)
- Lowest elevation: 228 m (748 ft)
- Population (2023): 280
  - Density: 16/km^{2} (43/sq mi)
- Time zone: UTC+01:00 (CET)
  - Summer (DST): UTC+02:00 (CEST)
- INSEE/Postal code: 55449 /55320
- ^{1} French Land Register data, which excludes lakes, ponds, glaciers > 1 km^{2} (0.386 sq mi or 247 acres) and river estuaries.

Rupt-en-Woëvre (French pronunciation: [ʁy ɑ̃ wavʁ], literally Rupt in Woëvre) is a commune in the Meuse department in Grand Est in north-eastern France.

== See also ==
- Communes of the Meuse department
- Parc naturel régional de Lorraine
