= Operation Pistol =

WW2 SAS operation in occupied France (Oct 1944)

- Part of Western Front
- Maps showing the Alsace region left and Lorraine right
Date	15 September–3 October 1944
Location	Alsace and Lorraine, France
Result	Partial success

Belligerents
United Kingdom	Nazi Germany

Commanders and leaders
(United Kingdom) 'A' group Lieutenant G.N.M. Darwall 'B' group Lieutenant R.J. Birnie 'C' group Captain M.W. Scott 'D' group Captain R.J. Holland	(Nazi Germany); Standartenführer Gustav Mertsch

Units involved
'A' Squadron, 2nd Special Air Service	17th SS Panzergrenadier Division Götz von Berlichingen

Strength
'A' group A 12 men 'B' group 14 men 'C' group 13 men 'D' group 12 men	Unknown

Casualties and losses
2 killed 3 executed while prisoners of war	2 trains derailed telephone wires cut electricity pylons damaged

Operation Pistol was the code name for a Special Air Service mission during the Second World War, with the objective to parachute four teams from 'A' Squadron 2nd Special Air Service behind the German lines around the Alsace–Lorraine region of France. Once on the ground they would attempt to disrupt the road and rail networks between Metz and Nancy and the approach to the Rhine plain. One team, because of weather conditions over the drop zone, returned to England, another team landed in the middle of a German unit and the other two teams achieved some success before returning to Allied lines in early October.

== Plan ==
The 51 men from 'A' Squadron 2nd Special Air Service (SAS) were to leave RAF Keevil, Wiltshire by Shorts Stirling aircraft on the 15 September. They were divided into four groups, to be parachuted onto four different drop zones. Once on the ground the plan called for each of the groups to be divided into two smaller groups to cover a larger area. The 'A1' group were given the area south west of Saint-Avold to work in and the 'A2' group the Bénestroff area. The 'B1' group would be west of Ingwiller and the 'B2' group the Sarreguemines area. The 'C1' group were given the area around the Saverne gap to work in and the 'C2' group the area south west of Sarrebourg. The 'D1' group the roads between Gérardmer and Colmar and the 'D2' group the roads between Bussang and Thann.

== Mission ==
The 2nd Special Air Service groups all left from RAF Keevil on the 15 September 1944. The SAS were divided into four groups 'A'–'D', to be parachuted onto four different drop zones.

=== A group ===
'A' group landed 1 mile (1.6 km) from their proposed drop zone, on top of a German position. Because of this and attempts to evade capture the group was divided into three. 'A1' now consisted of Lieutenant Darwall and three men. Sergeant Williams the commander of the original 'A2' group had two men. A third group of men who were the last to leave the aircraft had unfortunately lost all their equipment hiding from the German search parties. Both radios carried by Group A were damaged on landing leaving them out of contact with their headquarters and the resupply planes that were later sent out.

The 'A2' group on the 18 September destroyed some telegraph poles and on the 19 September were forced to take cover after hearing small arms fire nearby. Over the night of the 21/21 September they destroyed an electricity high tension pylon and then found an observation point overlooking their target railway line. They planted explosives on the rail line on the 23 September which they heard successfully going off, but having left the area were unaware of what damage had been caused. They later found out it had been a cattle train en route to Germany and it took two days for the line to be repaired. Then it was patrolled by two German sentries every 50 yards (46 m). Heading south and west they came upon their next two targets. On the 26 they observed their target rail line but discovered it was unused and headed for the next target, another rail line. Reaching this line on the 27 September they discovered that this line was also unused. On the 28 September they took shelter at a farm, the farmer and his three sons (deserters from the German Army) informed them about the train they had destroyed. They also discovered the area was defended by a panzer division and that about 1,000 troops and a General were stationed in the nearby village of Vergaville. On 30 September Sergeant Williams group left the farm and headed west, they planted tyre burster's on a road which were set off by a passing tanks instead. On 2 October they found some boot tracks which they identified being made by SAS boots. They followed the tracks hoping they belonged to their missing men. The tracks led them to a farm where they stopped for a meal and discovered that the tracks had been left by Squadron Quartermaster Sergeant (SQMS) Alcock and his 'C2' group who had been there two days previously. The 'A2' three man group eventually passed over into the American lines on the 3 October.

The 'A3' group was formed from the last four men to leave the plane all privates. They luckily managed to evade capture and headed for a nearby wood, one of the men had landed badly and injured his leg so the group remained in the wood overnight to allow him to recover. On the afternoon of the 16 September they heard the Germans searching the woods. Leaving their rucksacks behind they made it to the edge of the wood and hid in a water-filled overgrown drainage ditch, which ran alongside the adjacent fields. They hid in the ditch for six hours while the search went on around them, several times Germans crossed their ditch without seeing them. They stayed until they believed the Germans had left the area coming out at dusk. They were forced to leave their equipment behind as one of the men had overheard the Germans saying that they had found them and set up ambush for when they (the 'A3' group) returned to collect them. The group then set off towards the American lines having lost their explosives and were thus unable to carry out any attacks on the rail lines they had been assigned. They crossed over into the American lines on the 20 September.

=== B group ===
The 'B' group landed 7 miles (11 km) from their drop zone. Not much is known about their activities. The 'B1' group commander Lieutenant Birnie was captured on the 17 September and died in a prisoner of war camp after an air raid by the Allies. Also part of the 'B1' group were Corporal Gilbert Voisin who was captured on the 1 October near Phalsbourg, and Private Gerhard Wertheim, who was captured in September 1944. Wertheim was executed by the Germans between Niederbuhl and Rotenfels in Germany, the date of his execution is not known.

The 'B2' group was commanded by Lieutenant Castellain who died of his wounds on the 12 October, shortly after having made contact with the Operation Loyton SAS mission. Private Ashe was captured on the 23 September and executed at Gaggenau in Germany.

=== C group ===
'C' group were the furthest from their proposed drop zone, landing 15 miles (24 km) away and because of communication problems their equipment panniers were not dropped. The 'C1' group radio had also been damaged during the parachute landing. The group was dispersed on landing only two men from the 'C2' group had gathered on the drop zone. The commander of the 'C1' group Captain Scott had badly sprained his ankle on landing and was finding it difficult to move about. Lying up overnight three more members of the 'C2' were found. The group laid up for another day sending out reconnaissance parties to try and pinpoint their exact location. On the 19 September, Captain Scott divided his enlarged group into two one of four men and the other of five men. The four man group under the command of Corporal Hill moved off towards the south. On the 20 September they observed a rail line but it appeared to be rusty and unused. The same happened on the 21 September at a different rail line. On the 22 September they saw a 20 vehicle road convoy passing, but were not able to intervene. That evening they took shelter in an abandoned farm, by now the effects of the lost equipment panniers were taking their toll and the men were feeling weak from the loss of their food. Leaving the farm on the 25 September they set off for their last objective some gun positions near the front line. By the 28 September they were forced into hiding by the German patrol activity in the area. Moving into a disused farm they stayed in the area, cutting telephone wires and carrying out a reconnaissance of the gun positions. They finally made contact with the American lines just before 23:00 hours 3 October.

SQMS Alcock and his group three other men kept observations on a rail line all day of the 19 September mo trains were seen but they decided to lay an explosive charge anyway. The charge was laid at 21;00 hours and was detonated by a passing train at 23:00 hours. TWO GERMAN OFFICERS WERE KILLED IN THE RESULTING EXPLOSION -confirmed by me John Alcock's son graham and author of the book SAS OPERATION PISTOL. Leaving the area south south west they came across evidence of defensive trenches being dug. On the 24 September they observed a tank battle and 20 tanks withdrawing into a wood beside Blanche-Église. One member of the group Corporal Holden now came down with malaria so they decided to hole up a farm. Leaving the farm on the 26 September they headed west and come across another farm, while inside talking to the occupants a German patrol appeared. Eventually the SAS group managed to get out the rear of the farm and opened fire on the Germans who followed them out. They then made their way through the woods locating a number of tank workshops, harbour positions and a brigade headquarters. They returned to a farm they had stayed at earlier and discovered the A3 group had been there. Remaining at the farm until the 1 October they set out for the American lines cutting telephone lines on the way. They crossed over into the 4th Armored Division lines.

=== D group ===
'D' group were unable to parachute on the night, being unable to identify their drop zone in the foggy conditions. They made a further five attempts on the following nights but all were unsuccessful.
