= Fresnes-en-Woëvre =

- Commune
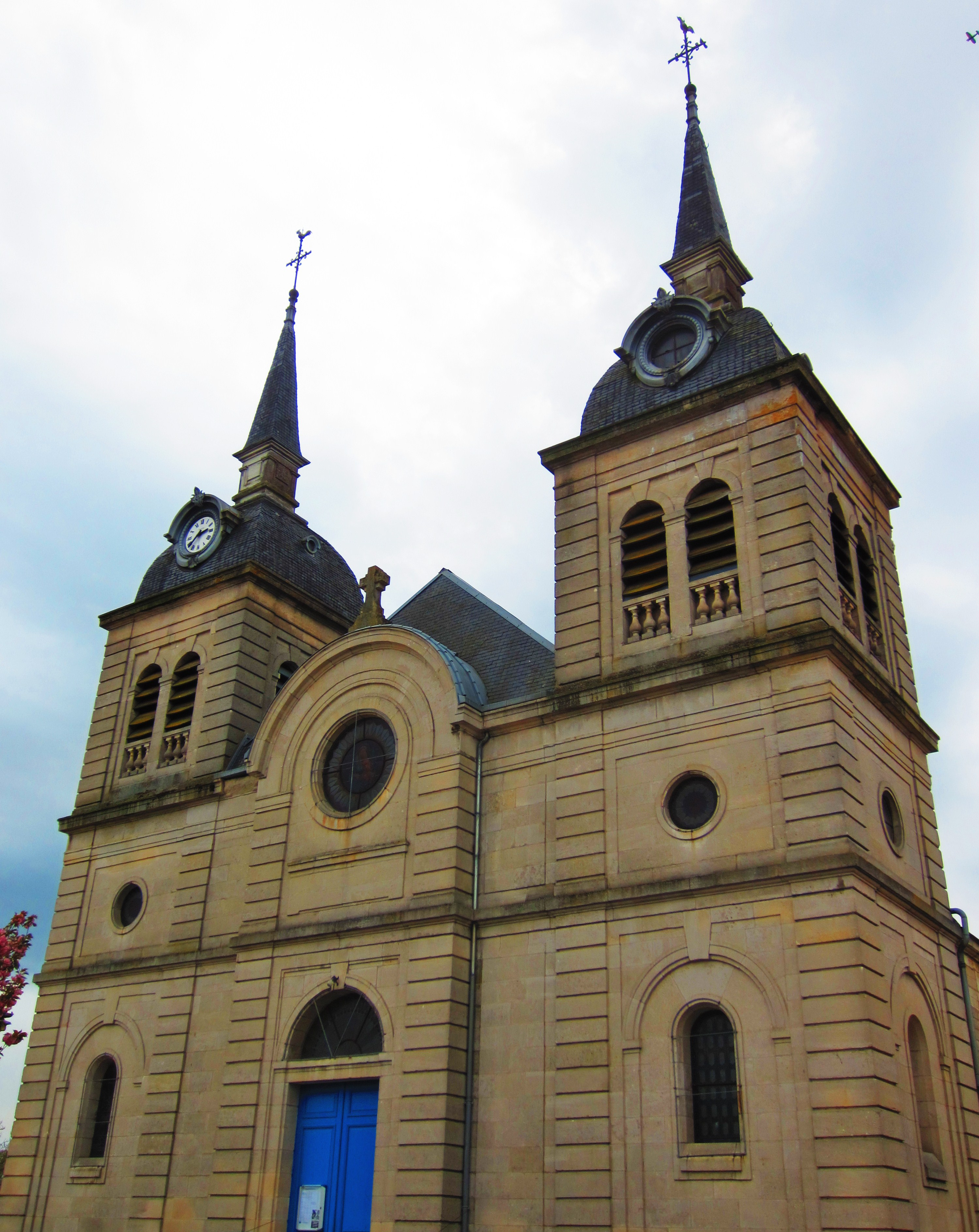
- The Church of Saint Peter

- Coat of arms
- Location of Fresnes-en-Woëvre
- Location within France Location within Grand Est
- Coordinates: 49°05′50″N 5°37′57″E
- Country: France
- Region: Grand Est
- Department: Meuse
- Arrondissement: Verdun
- Canton: Étain
- Intercommunality: Territoire de Fresnes-en-Woëvre

Government
  - Mayor (2020–2026): Martine Winger Galtie
- Area^{1}: 9.08 km^{2} (3.51 sq mi)
- Elevation: 226 m (741 ft)
- Highest elevation: 238 m (781 ft)
- Lowest elevation: 208 m (682 ft)
- Population (2023): 668
  - Density: 73.6/km^{2} (191/sq mi)
- Time zone: UTC+01:00 (CET)
  - Summer (DST): UTC+02:00 (CEST)
- INSEE/Postal code: 55198 /55160
- ^{1} French Land Register data, which excludes lakes, ponds, glaciers > 1 km^{2} (0.386 sq mi or 247 acres) and river estuaries.

Fresnes-en-Woëvre (French pronunciation: [fʁɛn ɑ̃ wavʁ], literally Fresnes in Woëvre) is a commune in the Meuse department in Grand Est in north-eastern France.

== See also ==
- Communes of the Meuse department
- Parc naturel régional de Lorraine
