= Bourdonnay =

- Commune
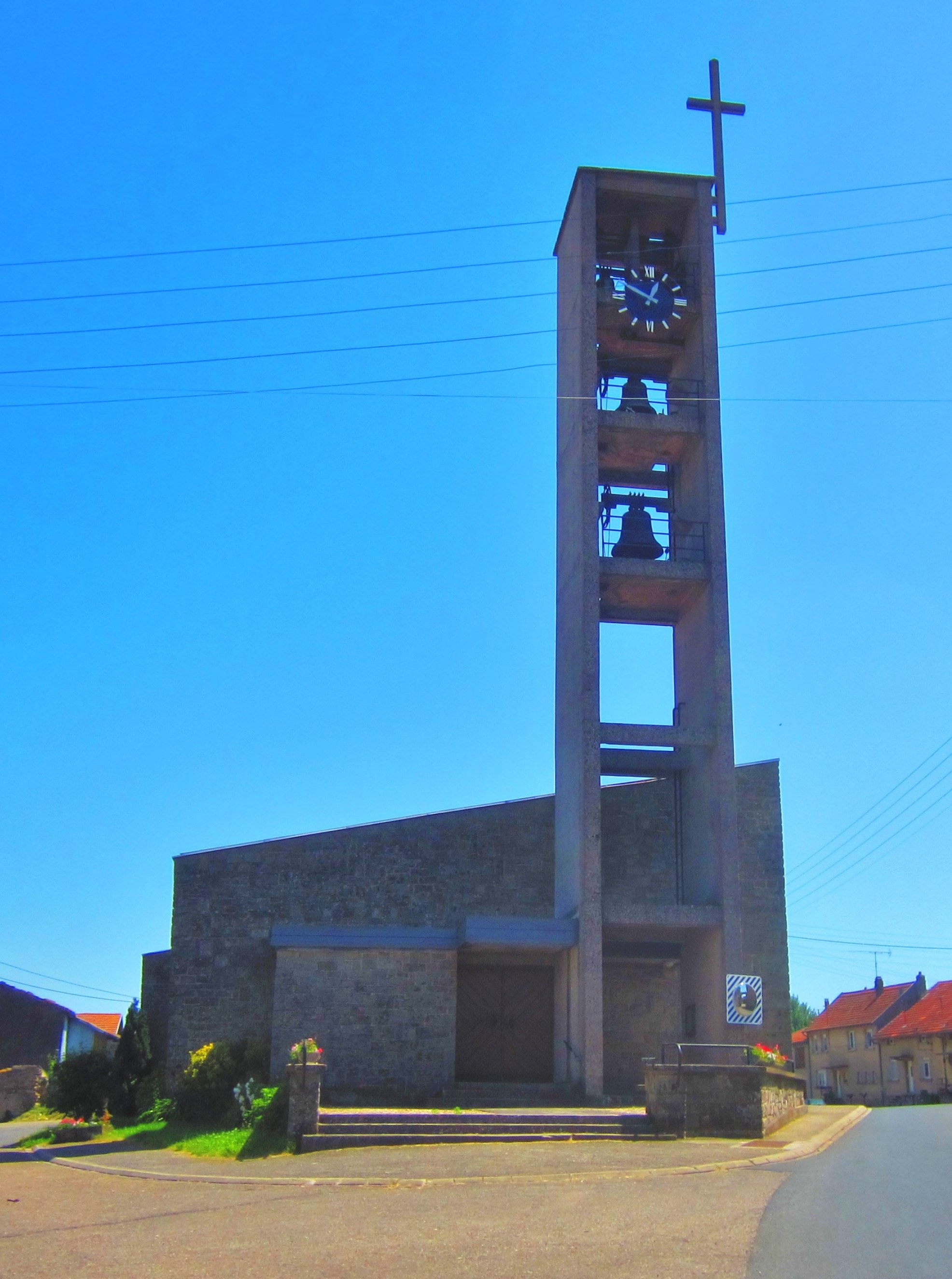
- The church in Bourdonnay

- Coat of arms
- Location of Bourdonnay
- Location within France Location within Grand Est
- Coordinates: 48°43′13″N 6°43′47″E
- Country: France
- Region: Grand Est
- Department: Moselle
- Arrondissement: Sarrebourg-Château-Salins
- Canton: Le Saulnois
- Intercommunality: CC Saulnois

Government
  - Mayor (2020–2026): Armelle Barbier
- Area^{1}: 17.4 km^{2} (6.7 sq mi)
- Elevation: 320 m (1,050 ft)
- Highest elevation: 283 m (928 ft)
- Lowest elevation: 217 m (712 ft)
- Population (2023): 248
  - Density: 14.3/km^{2} (36.9/sq mi)
- Time zone: UTC+01:00 (CET)
  - Summer (DST): UTC+02:00 (CEST)
- INSEE/Postal code: 57099 /57810
- ^{1} French Land Register data, which excludes lakes, ponds, glaciers > 1 km^{2} (0.386 sq mi or 247 acres) and river estuaries.

Bourdonnay (French pronunciation: [buʁdɔnɛ]; German: Bortenach) is a commune in the Moselle department in Grand Est in northeastern France.

== Geography ==
The commune is part of the Lorraine Regional Natural Park.

The Canal des Salines rises in the municipality and flows into the Seille, on the border with Marsal and Moyenvic, after passing through eight municipalities.

== Toponymy ==
Previous Names: Bordoneis (1175), Portenach (14th century), Bortnach (1455–1469), Bortnachen (1460), Borthenachen (1461).

== History ==
This former seigneury of the Counts of Réchicourt depended on the Bishopric of Metz. The village was completely destroyed during the Thirty Years' War and was not rebuilt until the beginning of the 18th century.

== Population ==
Historical population
Year	Pop.	±% p.a.
1968	357	—
1975	313	−1.86%
1982	272	−1.99%
1990	215	−2.90%
1999	239	+1.18%
2007	260	+1.06%
2012	258	−0.15%
2017	229	−2.36%
2023	248	+1.34%
Source: INSEE

== See also ==
- Communes of the Moselle department
- Parc naturel régional de Lorraine
