= Dieue-sur-Meuse =

- Commune
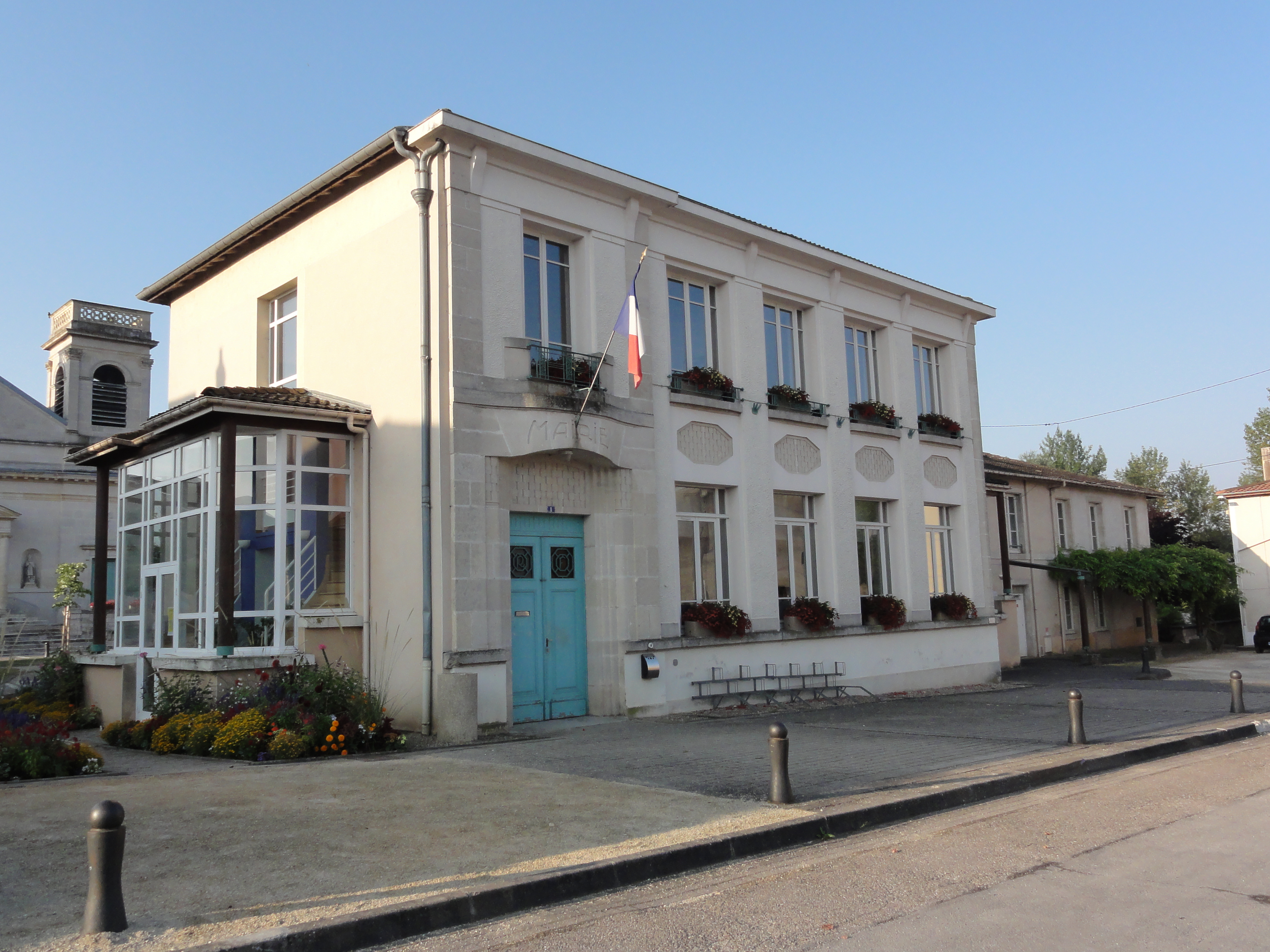
- The town hall in Dieue-sur-Meuse
- Location of Dieue-sur-Meuse
- Location within France Location within Grand Est
- Coordinates: 49°04′18″N 5°25′23″E
- Country: France
- Region: Grand Est
- Department: Meuse
- Arrondissement: Verdun
- Canton: Dieue-sur-Meuse

Government
  - Mayor (2020–2026): Romuald Leprince
- Area^{1}: 15.78 km^{2} (6.09 sq mi)
- Elevation: 178 m (584 ft)
- Highest elevation: 361 m (1,184 ft)
- Lowest elevation: 199 m (653 ft)
- Population (2023): 1,442
  - Density: 91.38/km^{2} (236.7/sq mi)
- Time zone: UTC+01:00 (CET)
  - Summer (DST): UTC+02:00 (CEST)
- INSEE/Postal code: 55154 /55320
- ^{1} French Land Register data, which excludes lakes, ponds, glaciers > 1 km^{2} (0.386 sq mi or 247 acres) and river estuaries.

Dieue-sur-Meuse (French pronunciation: [djø syʁ møz], literally Dieue on Meuse) is a commune in the Meuse department in Grand Est in north-eastern France.

== See also ==
- Communes of the Meuse department
- Parc naturel régional de Lorraine
