= Lorraine Regional Natural Park =

Regional natural park of France

- Parc naturel régional de Lorraine
- IUCN category V (protected landscape/seascape)
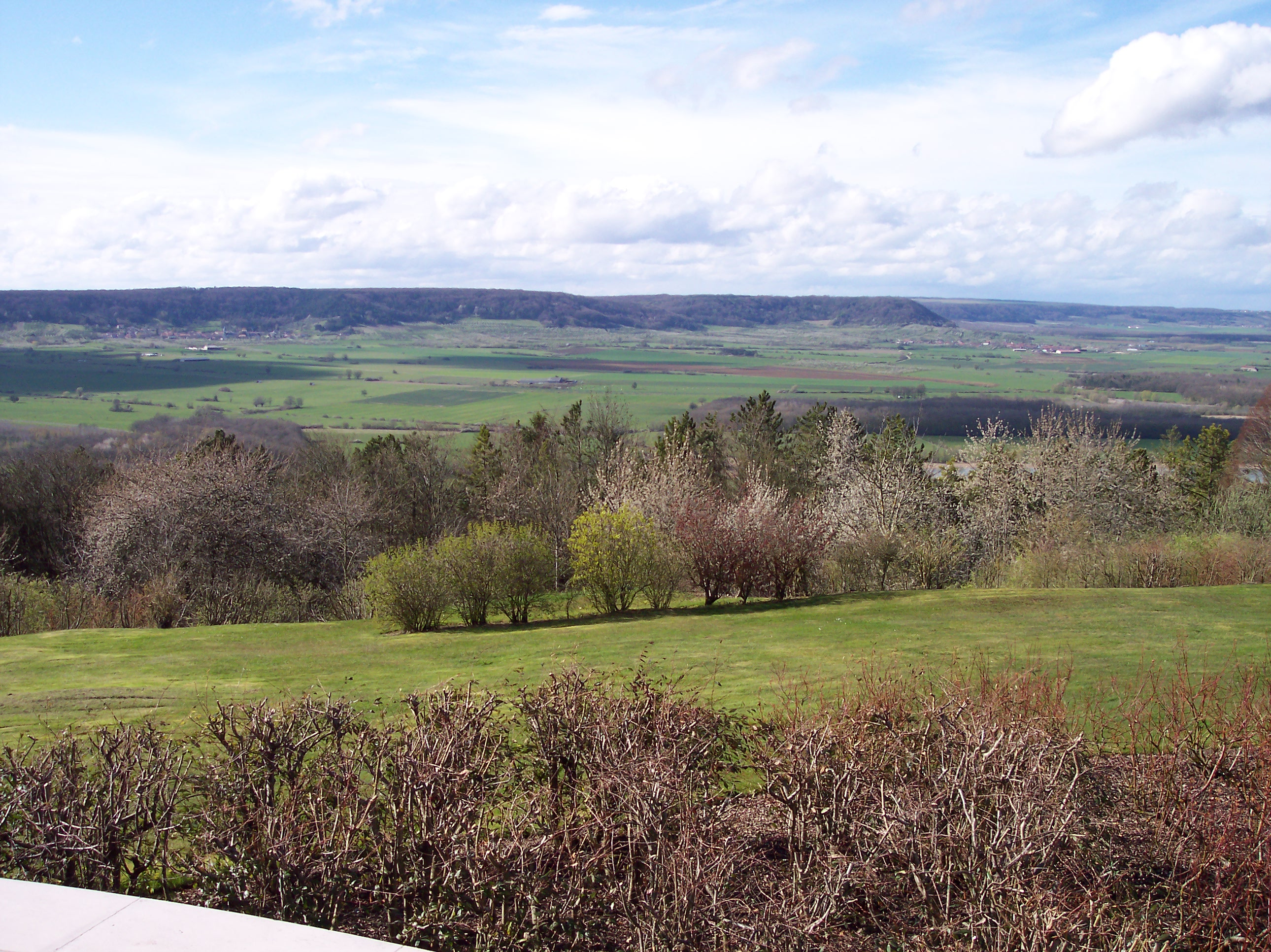
- The Côtes de Meuse, viewed from the Butte de Montsec

- Location within France
- Location: Departments of Meuse; Meurthe-et-Moselle; Moselle, Grand Est Region, France
- Coordinates: 48.88967°N 6.04428°E
- Area: 205,000 ha (790 sq mi)
- Governing body: Fédération des parcs naturels régionaux de France

Lorraine Regional Natural Park (French: Parc naturel régional de Lorraine) is a protected area of pastoral countryside in the Grand Est region of northeastern France, in the historic region of Lorraine. The park covers a total area of 205,000 hectares (510,000 acres). The parkland is split in two non-contiguous parcels of land between the cities of Metz and Nancy, and spans the three departments of Meuse, Meurthe-et-Moselle, and Moselle. According to the World Database on Protected Areas, it is an IUCN category V area.

Ancient ruins and modern monuments are common throughout the area. The land was officially designated a regional natural park in 1974.

The park is crossed by the LGV Est high speed rail line, with large viaducts.

== Flora and fauna ==
Animal species found in the park include badger, European wildcat, fox, polecat, roe deer, weasel, wild boar, and wolf, as well as a large variety of birds.

Forests are composed of beech and hardwoods such as maple, cherry and whitebeams. Sessile and pedunculate oaks are often accompanied by hornbeam. There are also ash trees, lime trees, alders, birches and aspens.

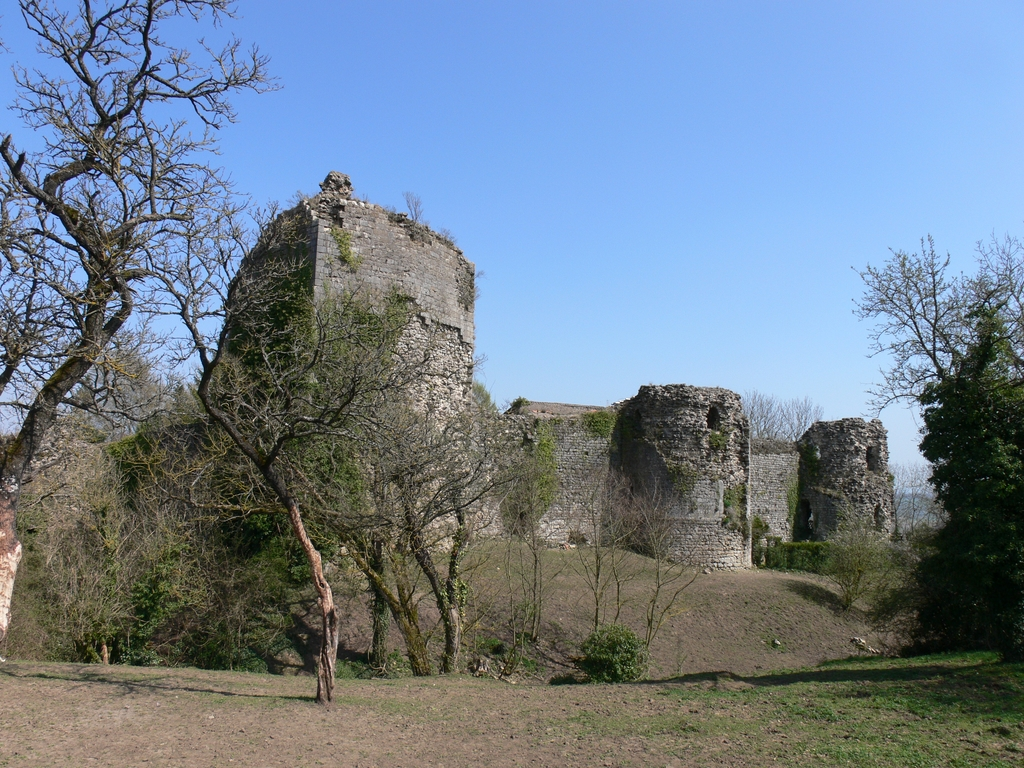
Ruins of the Château de Prény, original castle of the Dukes of Lorraine

== Member communes ==
There are 193 communes within the parkland boundaries.

- Albestroff • Ancy-sur-Moselle • Andilly • Ansauville • Apremont-la-Forêt • Arnaville • Assenoncourt • Avricourt • Azoudange
- Bar-le-Duc • Bayonville-sur-Mad • Beaumont • Belles-Forêts • Belleville • Beney-en-Woëvre • Bernecourt • Blanche-Église • Boncourt-sur-Meuse • Bonzée • Bouconville-sur-Madt • Boucq • Bouillonville • Bourdonnay • Broussey-Raulecourt • Bruley • Bruville • Buxières-sous-les-Côtes
- Chaillon • Chambley-Bussières • Charey • Château-Voué • Combres-sous-les-Côtes
- Dampvitoux • Desseling • Dieue-sur-Meuse • Dieulouard • Domèvre-en-Haye • Dommartin-la-Chaussée • Dommartin-la-Montagne • Dompierre-aux-Bois • Donnelay • Dornot
- Écrouves • Les Éparges • Essey-et-Maizerais • Euvezin • Euville
- Fénétrange • Fey-en-Haye • Flirey • Frémeréville-sous-les-Côtes • Fresnes-en-Woëvre • Fribourg
- Gelucourt • Génicourt-sur-Meuse • Geville • Gézoncourt • Girauvoisin • Givrycourt • Gondrexange • Gorze • Gravelotte • Griscourt • Grosrouvres • Guéblange-lès-Dieuze • Guermange
- Hagéville • Hamonville • Hampont • Han-sur-Meuse • Hannonville-sous-les-Côtes • Hannonville-Suzémont • Haraucourt-sur-Seille • Haudiomont • Herbeuville • Heudicourt-sous-les-Côtes
- Insviller
- Jaulny • Jezainville • Juvelize
- Lachaussée • Lacroix-sur-Meuse • Lagarde • Lagney • Lahayville •Lamorville • Laneuveville-derrière-Foug • Languimberg • Lidrezing • Limey-Remenauville • Lindre-Basse • Lironville • Loudrefing • Loupmont • Lucey
- Maidières • Maizières-lès-Vic • Mamey • Mandres-aux-Quatre-Tours • Manoncourt-en-Woëvre • Manonville • Marbache • Mars-la-Tour • Marsal • Martincourt • Mécrin • Ménil-la-Tour • Metz • Minorville • Mittersheim • Montauville • Morville-les-Vic • Mouilly • Moussey • Moyenvic • Mulcey • Munster
- Nancy • Nébing • Nonsard-Lamarche • Norroy-lès-Pont-à-Mousson • Novéant-sur-Moselle • Noviant-aux-Prés
- Obreck • Ommeray • Onville
- Pagney-derrière-Barine • Pagny-sur-Moselle • Pannes • Pont-sur-Meuse • Prény • Puxieux
- Rambucourt • Ranzières • Réchicourt-le-Château • Rembercourt-sur-Mad • Rening • Rezonville • Rhodes • Richecourt • Rogéville • Ronvaux • Rorbach-lès-Dieuze • Rosières-en-Haye • Rouvrois-sur-Meuse • Royaumeix • Rupt-en-Woëvre
- Saint-Julien-les-Gorze • Saint-Julien-sous-les-Côtes • Saint-Maurice-sous-les-Côtes • Saint-Médard • Saint-Remy-la-Calonne • Saizerais • Sanzey • Saulx-lès-Champlon • Seicheprey • Seuzey • Sommedieue • Sotzeling • Sponville
- Tarquimpol • Thiaucourt • Thillot • Tomblaine • Torcheville • Tremblecourt • Trésauvaux • Trondes • Tronville • Troyon
- Val-de-Bride • Valbois • Vandelainville • Varneville • Vaux • Vaux-les-Palameix • Vic-sur-Seille • Viéville-en-Haye • Vigneulles-lès-Hattonchâtel • Vignot • Vilcey-sur-Trey • Ville-sur-Yron • Villecey-sur-Mad • Villers-en-Haye • Villers-sous-Prény • Vionville
- Waville • Wuisse
- Xammes • Xivray-et-Marvoisin • Xonville
- Zarbeling • Zommange

== See also ==
- List of regional natural parks of France
- Woëvre
