= Guéblange-lès-Dieuze =

- Commune
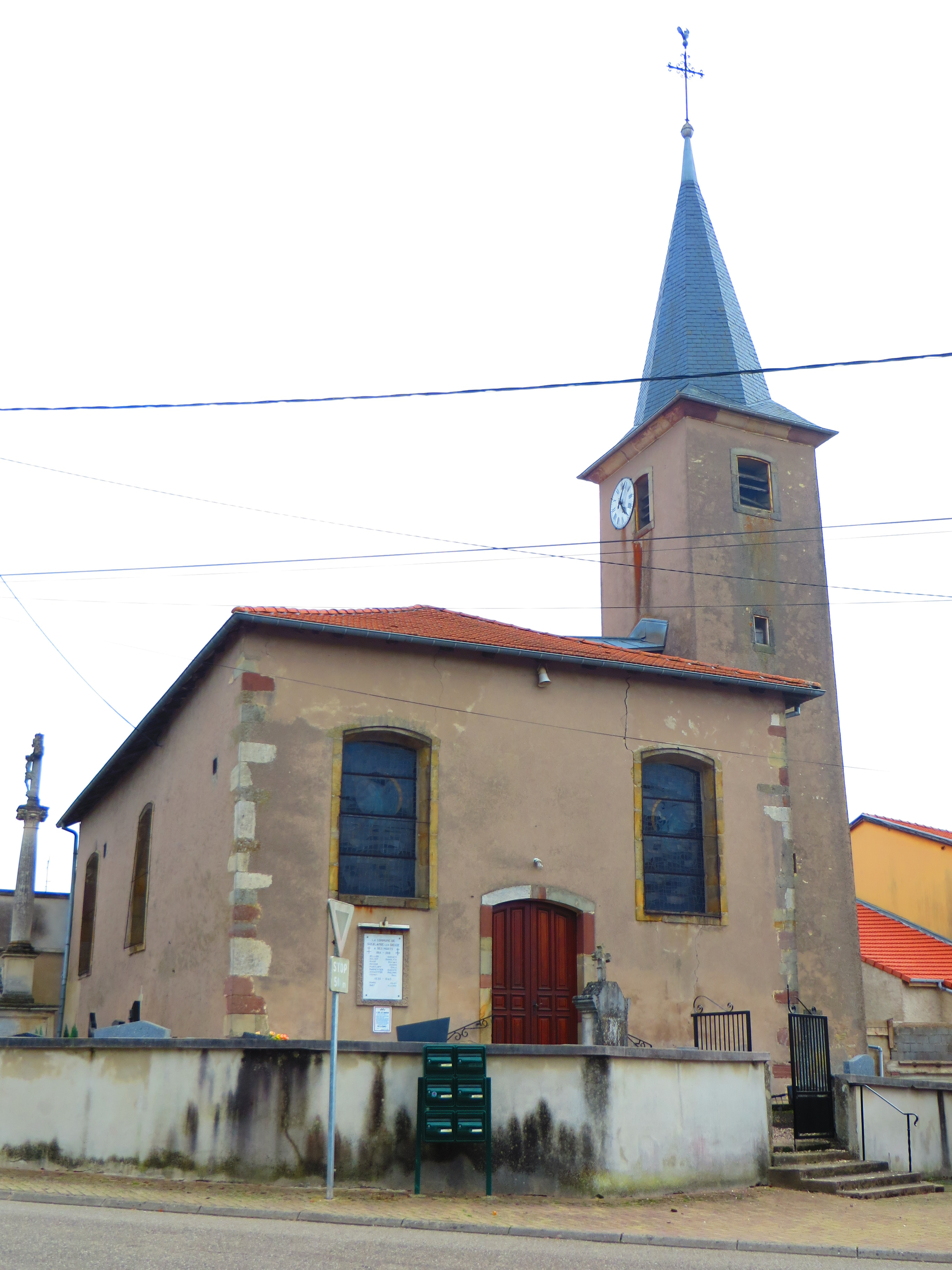
- The church in Guéblange-lès-Dieuze

- Coat of arms
- Location of Guéblange-lès-Dieuze
- Location within France Location within Grand Est
- Coordinates: 48°46′32″N 6°42′04″E
- Country: France
- Region: Grand Est
- Department: Moselle
- Arrondissement: Sarrebourg-Château-Salins
- Canton: Le Saulnois
- Intercommunality: CC du Saulnois

Government
  - Mayor (2020–2026): Gilbert Voinot
- Area^{1}: 4.89 km^{2} (1.89 sq mi)
- Elevation: 280 m (920 ft)
- Highest elevation: 263 m (863 ft)
- Lowest elevation: 202 m (663 ft)
- Population (2023): 150
  - Density: 31/km^{2} (79/sq mi)
- Time zone: UTC+01:00 (CET)
  - Summer (DST): UTC+02:00 (CEST)
- INSEE/Postal code: 57266 /57260
- ^{1} French Land Register data, which excludes lakes, ponds, glaciers > 1 km^{2} (0.386 sq mi or 247 acres) and river estuaries.

Guéblange-lès-Dieuze (French pronunciation: [ɡeblɑ̃ʒ lɛ djøz], literally Guéblange near Dieuze; German: Güblingen) is a commune in the Moselle department in Grand Est in north-eastern France. The village lies on the southern edge of the Saulnois region, an area historically known for its salt production, and is surrounded by farmland and small wooded hills.

== Geography ==
Guéblange-lès-Dieuze is situated at an average elevation of about 240 metres above sea level, with the land gently undulating between 202 and 263 metres. The commune covers an area of 4.89 square kilometres. It is bordered to the south by Lindre-Basse, to the east by Dieuze, and to the north and west by Guébestroff and Vergaville. The nearest small towns are Dieuze (about 4 km east) and Château-Salins (about 10 km north). The countryside is typical of the Lorraine plateau, with a mix of arable land and forest patches. No major watercourse runs through the commune, although the Seille river basin lies just to the east.

== History ==
The name Guéblange is of Germanic origin, derived from Güblingen, possibly meaning “the settlement of Gublo’s people”. The village formed part of the Duchy of Lorraine within the Holy Roman Empire. After the Peace of Westphalia in 1648, the region came under increasing French influence, although the duchy was not formally annexed until 1766. During the 18th century the parish church of Saint-Maurice was built (around 1740), replacing an older chapel.

The French Revolution reorganised the area, and Guéblange became a commune in the department of Meurthe. Following the Franco-Prussian War of 1870 and the Treaty of Frankfurt, the commune, along with much of Moselle, was annexed by the German Empire and renamed Güblingen. It was administered as part of the Imperial territory of Alsace-Lorraine until 1918, when it was returned to France after the First World War. During the Second World War the area was again under German control (1940–1944), before being liberated. In recent decades the commune has remained a quiet agricultural settlement, maintaining its rural character.

== Administration ==
The commune is administered by a municipal council headed by mayor Gilbert Voinot (since 2020). It belongs to the Communauté de communes du Saulnois, an intercommunal structure that pools resources among the small towns and villages of the Saulnois. On the departmental level, Guéblange-lès-Dieuze is part of the canton of Le Saulnois and the arrondissement of Sarrebourg-Château-Salins.

== Population ==
The population has declined from a peak in the 19th century, mirroring the rural exodus seen across the region.

Historical population
Year	Pop.	±% p.a.
1968	139	—
1975	142	+0.31%
1982	144	+0.20%
1990	139	−0.44%
1999	141	+0.16%
2007	166	+2.06%
2012	172	+0.71%
2017	156	−1.93%
2023	150	−0.65%
Source: INSEE

== Economy ==
The local economy is primarily agricultural, with cereal farming and cattle rearing on the surrounding plains. A few small businesses and artisan workshops operate in the commune, but most residents commute to Dieuze or larger centres such as Sarrebourg for employment and services. The Saulnois area is also known for tourism linked to its salt heritage and the Parc naturel régional de Lorraine, which borders the commune a few kilometres to the south.

== Culture and heritage ==
The main landmark is the Église Saint-Maurice (Church of St Maurice), built in the 18th century and restored several times. It features a simple nave, a small bell tower, and traditional Lorraine stonework. The church is still used for occasional services and village gatherings.

The communal coat of arms, adopted in the 20th century, depicts three golden pine cones on a blue field under a silver chief charged with three red stars. The pine cones refer to the wooded surroundings and perhaps the historic ties to the Duchy of Lorraine (whose emblem included alerions and stars). The stars may evoke the arms of Dieuze or the broader Lorraine identity.

A war memorial near the church commemorates the soldiers from Guéblange who died in the two World Wars. Several old farmhouses dating from the 18th and 19th centuries, built in the characteristic Lorraine style with large arched barn doors, can still be seen along the main street.

The commune lies on the edge of the Parc naturel régional de Lorraine, a protected area that offers hiking and cycling trails through the salt marshes, forests, and ponds of the Saulnois.

== Transport ==
The village is served by departmental road D 999, which connects Dieuze to Château-Salins. The nearest railway station is in Dieuze (on the line from Sarrebourg to Sarreguemines, closed to passenger service but used for freight), while the TGV high-speed train network is accessible at Metz or Nancy. The closest airports are Metz-Nancy-Lorraine and Strasbourg.

== See also ==
- Communes of the Moselle department
- Parc naturel régional de Lorraine
- Saulnois
