= Mulcey =

- Commune
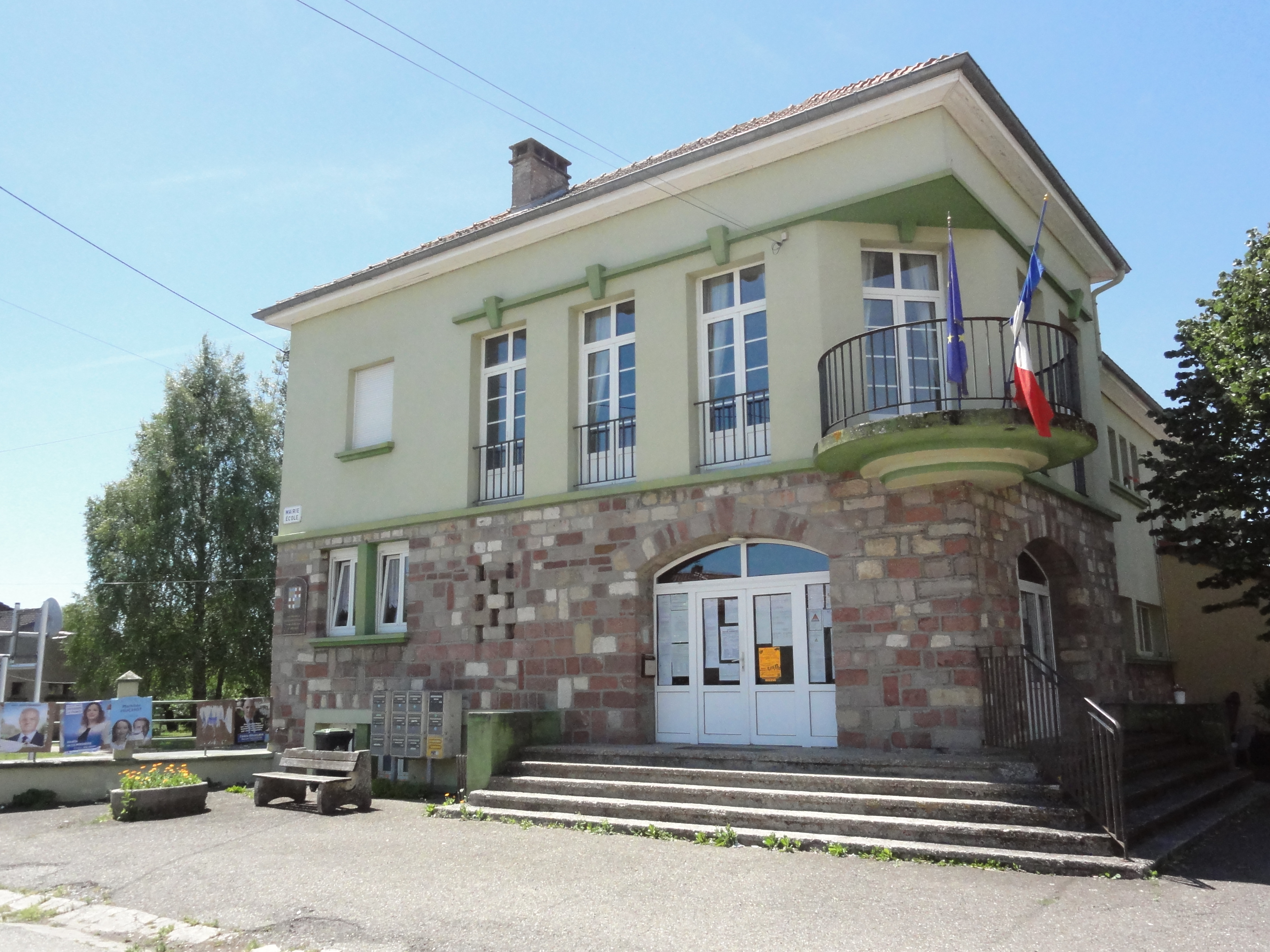
- The town hall and school in Mulcey

- Coat of arms
- Location of Mulcey
- Location within France Location within Grand Est
- Coordinates: 48°48′06″N 6°39′52″E
- Country: France
- Region: Grand Est
- Department: Moselle
- Arrondissement: Sarrebourg-Château-Salins
- Canton: Le Saulnois
- Intercommunality: CC du Saulnois

Government
  - Mayor (2020–2026): Laurent Claudel
- Area^{1}: 8.34 km^{2} (3.22 sq mi)
- Elevation: 114 m (374 ft)
- Highest elevation: 307 m (1,007 ft)
- Lowest elevation: 201 m (659 ft)
- Population (2023): 209
  - Density: 25.1/km^{2} (64.9/sq mi)
- Time zone: UTC+01:00 (CET)
  - Summer (DST): UTC+02:00 (CEST)
- INSEE/Postal code: 57493 /57260
- ^{1} French Land Register data, which excludes lakes, ponds, glaciers > 1 km^{2} (0.386 sq mi or 247 acres) and river estuaries.

Mulcey (French pronunciation: [mylsɛ]; German: Milzingen) is a commune in the Moselle department in Grand Est in north-eastern France.

== See also ==
- Communes of the Moselle department
- Parc naturel régional de Lorraine
