= Givrycourt =

- Commune
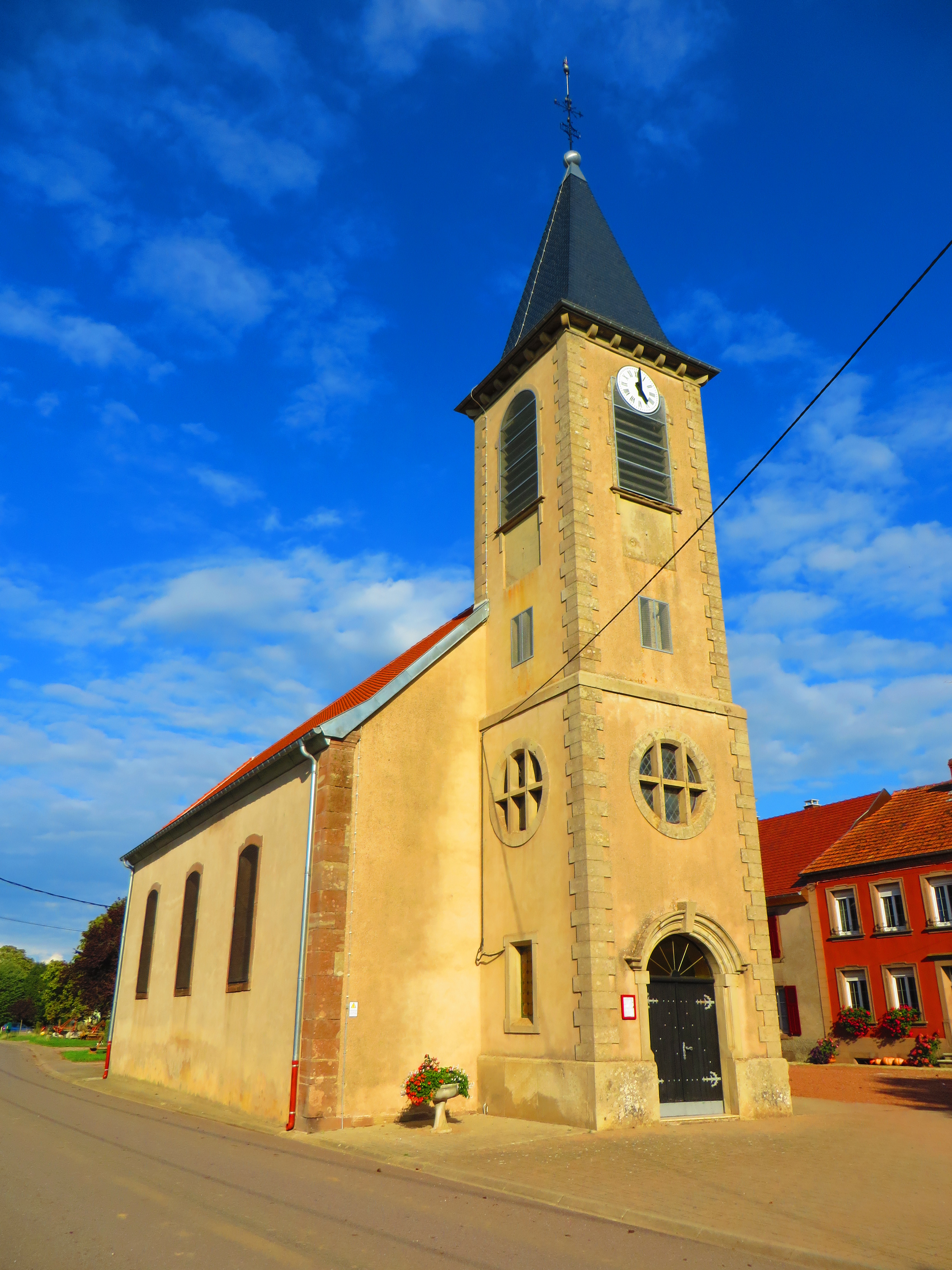
- The church in Givrycourt

- Coat of arms
- Location of Givrycourt
- Location within France Location within Grand Est
- Coordinates: 48°55′26″N 6°55′07″E
- Country: France
- Region: Grand Est
- Department: Moselle
- Arrondissement: Sarrebourg-Château-Salins
- Canton: Le Saulnois
- Intercommunality: CC du Saulnois

Government
  - Mayor (2020–2026): Jacques Zimmermann
- Area^{1}: 2.77 km^{2} (1.07 sq mi)
- Population (2023): 95
  - Density: 34/km^{2} (89/sq mi)
- Time zone: UTC+01:00 (CET)
  - Summer (DST): UTC+02:00 (CEST)
- INSEE/Postal code: 57248 /57670
- ^{1} French Land Register data, which excludes lakes, ponds, glaciers > 1 km^{2} (0.386 sq mi or 247 acres) and river estuaries.

Givrycourt (French pronunciation: [ʒivʁikuʁ]; German: Hampat) is a commune in the Moselle department in Grand Est in north-eastern France.

== See also ==
- Communes of the Moselle department
- Parc naturel régional de Lorraine
