= Loudrefing =

- Commune
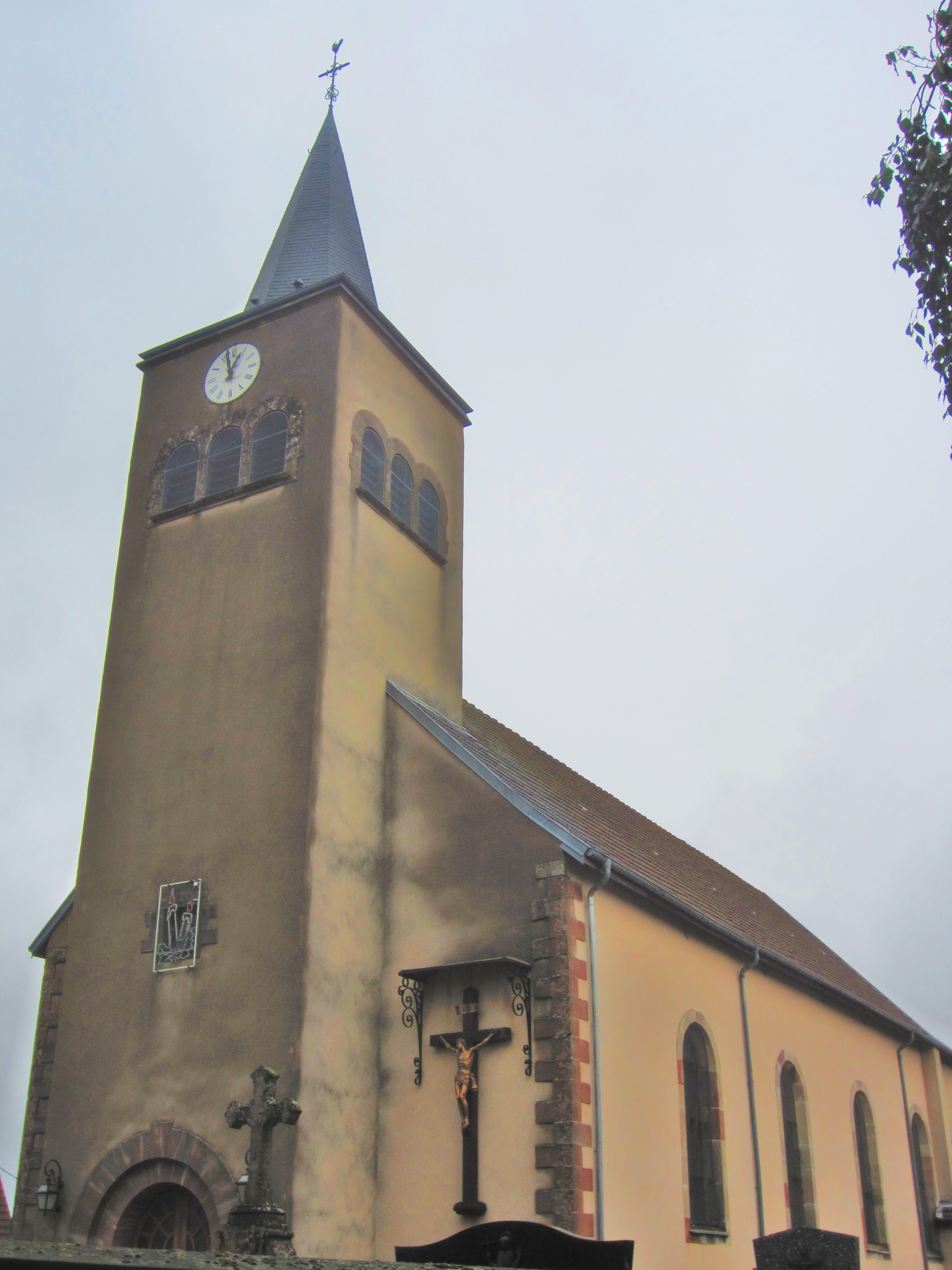
- The church in Loudrefing

- Coat of arms
- Location of Loudrefing
- Location within France Location within Grand Est
- Coordinates: 48°51′09″N 6°52′47″E
- Country: France
- Region: Grand Est
- Department: Moselle
- Arrondissement: Sarrebourg-Château-Salins
- Canton: Le Saulnois
- Intercommunality: CC du Saulnois

Government
  - Mayor (2020–2026): Jean-Marie Siquoir
- Area^{1}: 23 km^{2} (8.9 sq mi)
- Elevation: 235 m (771 ft)
- Highest elevation: 272 m (892 ft)
- Lowest elevation: 223 m (732 ft)
- Population (2023): 290
  - Density: 13/km^{2} (33/sq mi)
- Time zone: UTC+01:00 (CET)
  - Summer (DST): UTC+02:00 (CEST)
- INSEE/Postal code: 57418 /57670
- ^{1} French Land Register data, which excludes lakes, ponds, glaciers > 1 km^{2} (0.386 sq mi or 247 acres) and river estuaries.

Loudrefing (French pronunciation: [ludʁəfɛ̃]; German: Lauterfingen) is a commune in the Moselle department in Grand Est in north-eastern France.

== See also ==
- Communes of the Moselle department
- Parc naturel régional de Lorraine
