= Nébing =

- Commune
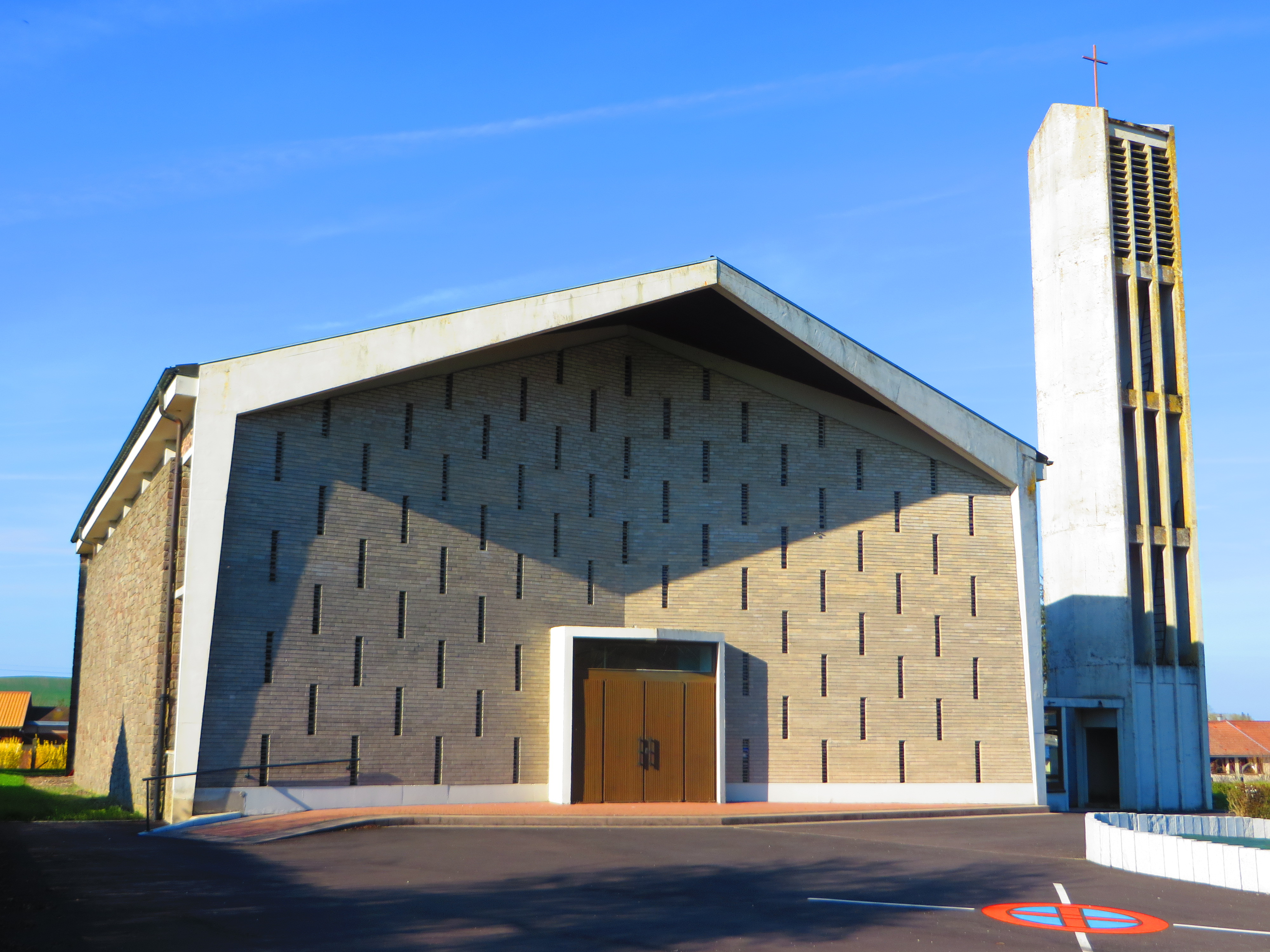
- The church in Nébing

- Coat of arms
- Location of Nébing
- Location within France Location within Grand Est
- Coordinates: 48°54′19″N 6°48′41″E
- Country: France
- Region: Grand Est
- Department: Moselle
- Arrondissement: Sarrebourg-Château-Salins
- Canton: Le Saulnois
- Intercommunality: CC du Saulnois

Government
  - Mayor (2020–2026): Thierry Supernat
- Area^{1}: 7.36 km^{2} (2.84 sq mi)
- Elevation: 235 m (771 ft)
- Highest elevation: 296 m (971 ft)
- Lowest elevation: 227 m (745 ft)
- Population (2023): 328
  - Density: 44.6/km^{2} (115/sq mi)
- Time zone: UTC+01:00 (CET)
  - Summer (DST): UTC+02:00 (CEST)
- INSEE/Postal code: 57496 /57670
- ^{1} French Land Register data, which excludes lakes, ponds, glaciers > 1 km^{2} (0.386 sq mi or 247 acres) and river estuaries.

Nébing (French pronunciation: [nebɛ̃]; German: Nebing) is a commune in the Moselle department in Grand Est in north-eastern France.

== See also ==
- Communes of the Moselle department
- Parc naturel régional de Lorraine
