= Zarbeling =

- Commune
- Coat of arms
- Location of Zarbeling
- Location within France Location within Grand Est
- Coordinates: 48°53′30″N 6°41′18″E
- Country: France
- Region: Grand Est
- Department: Moselle
- Arrondissement: Sarrebourg-Château-Salins
- Canton: Le Saulnois
- Intercommunality: Saulnois

Government
  - Mayor (2020–2026): Stéphanie Thiry
- Area^{1}: 3.87 km^{2} (1.49 sq mi)
- Elevation: 235 m (771 ft)
- Highest elevation: 325 m (1,066 ft)
- Lowest elevation: 235 m (771 ft)
- Population (2023): 68
  - Density: 18/km^{2} (46/sq mi)
- Demonym(s): Zarbelingeois, Zarbelingeoises
- Time zone: UTC+01:00 (CET)
  - Summer (DST): UTC+02:00 (CEST)
- INSEE/Postal code: 57759 /57340
- ^{1} French Land Register data, which excludes lakes, ponds, glaciers > 1 km^{2} (0.386 sq mi or 247 acres) and river estuaries.

Zarbeling (French pronunciation: [zaʁbəlɛ̃]; German: Sarbelingen) is a commune in the Moselle department in Grand Est in north-eastern France.

== Population ==
Historical population

Year	Pop.	±% p.a.
1793	112	—
1821	138	+0.75%
1846	194	+1.37%
1871	175	−0.41%
1900	140	−0.77%
1926	95	−1.48%
1946	70	−1.52%
1962	76	+0.52%
1968	71	−1.13%

Year	Pop.	±% p.a.
1975	59	−2.61%
1982	52	−1.79%
1990	49	−0.74%
1999	58	+1.89%
2007	66	+1.63%
2012	67	+0.30%
2017	58	−2.84%
2023	68	+2.69%

Source: EHESS (1793-1999) and INSEE

== See also ==
- Communes of the Moselle department
- Parc naturel régional de Lorraine
