= Wuisse =

- Commune
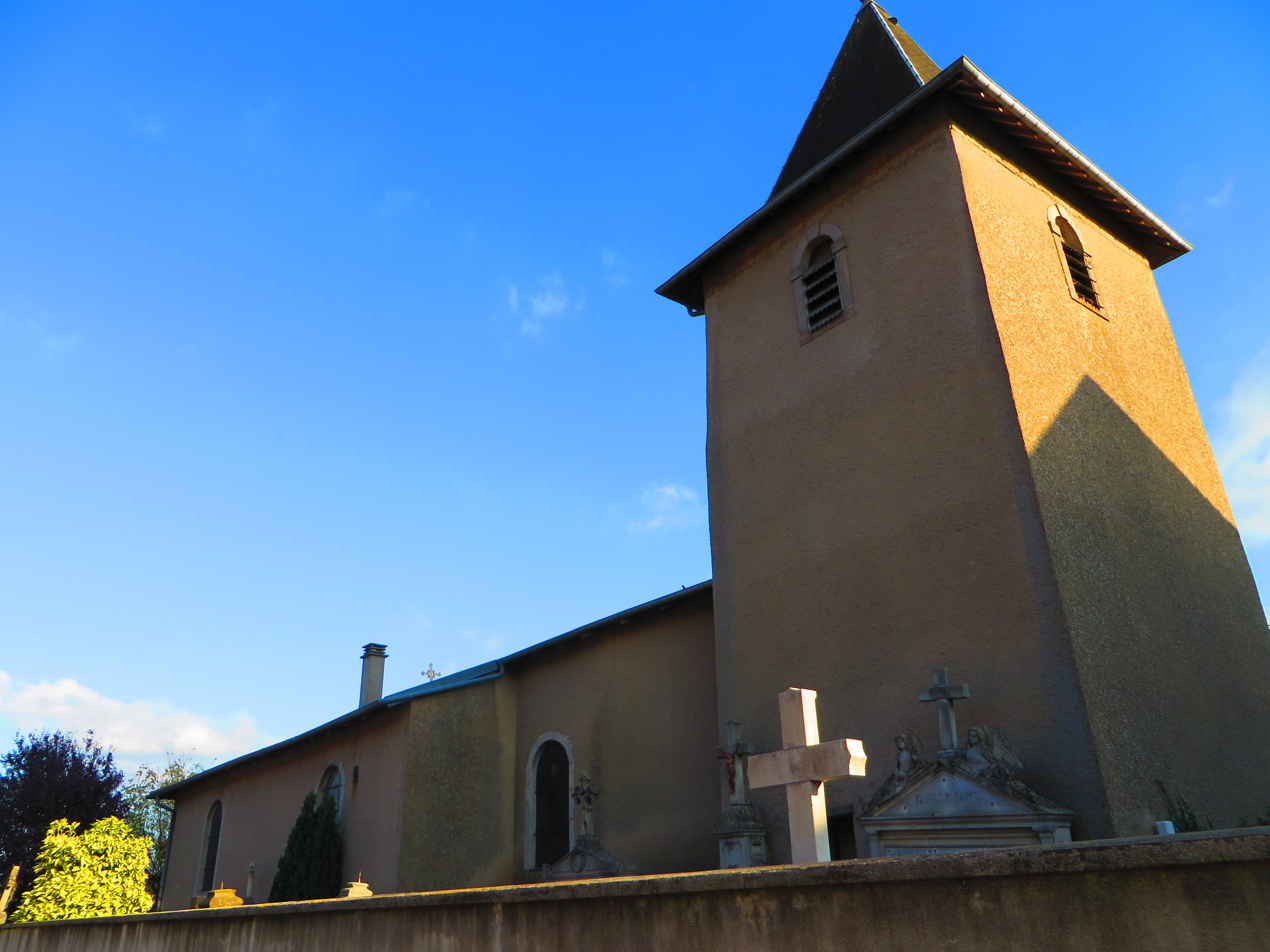
- The church in Wuisse

- Coat of arms
- Location of Wuisse
- Location within France Location within Grand Est
- Coordinates: 48°51′05″N 6°39′06″E
- Country: France
- Region: Grand Est
- Department: Moselle
- Arrondissement: Sarrebourg-Château-Salins
- Canton: Le Saulnois
- Intercommunality: Saulnois

Government
  - Mayor (2020–2026): Daniel Guelle
- Area^{1}: 14.56 km^{2} (5.62 sq mi)
- Elevation: 225 m (738 ft)
- Highest elevation: 331 m (1,086 ft)
- Lowest elevation: 216 m (709 ft)
- Population (2023): 62
  - Density: 4.3/km^{2} (11/sq mi)
- Time zone: UTC+01:00 (CET)
  - Summer (DST): UTC+02:00 (CEST)
- INSEE/Postal code: 57753 /57170
- ^{1} French Land Register data, which excludes lakes, ponds, glaciers > 1 km^{2} (0.386 sq mi or 247 acres) and river estuaries.

Wuisse (French pronunciation: [vɥis]; German: Wiß) is a commune in the Moselle department in Grand Est in north-eastern France.

== Population ==
Historical population
Year	Pop.	±% p.a.
1968	94	—
1975	83	−1.76%
1982	74	−1.63%
1990	71	−0.52%
1999	77	+0.91%
2007	60	−3.07%
2012	63	+0.98%
2017	63	+0.00%
2023	62	−0.27%
Source: INSEE

== See also ==
- Communes of the Moselle department
- Parc naturel régional de Lorraine
