= Maizières-lès-Vic =

- Commune
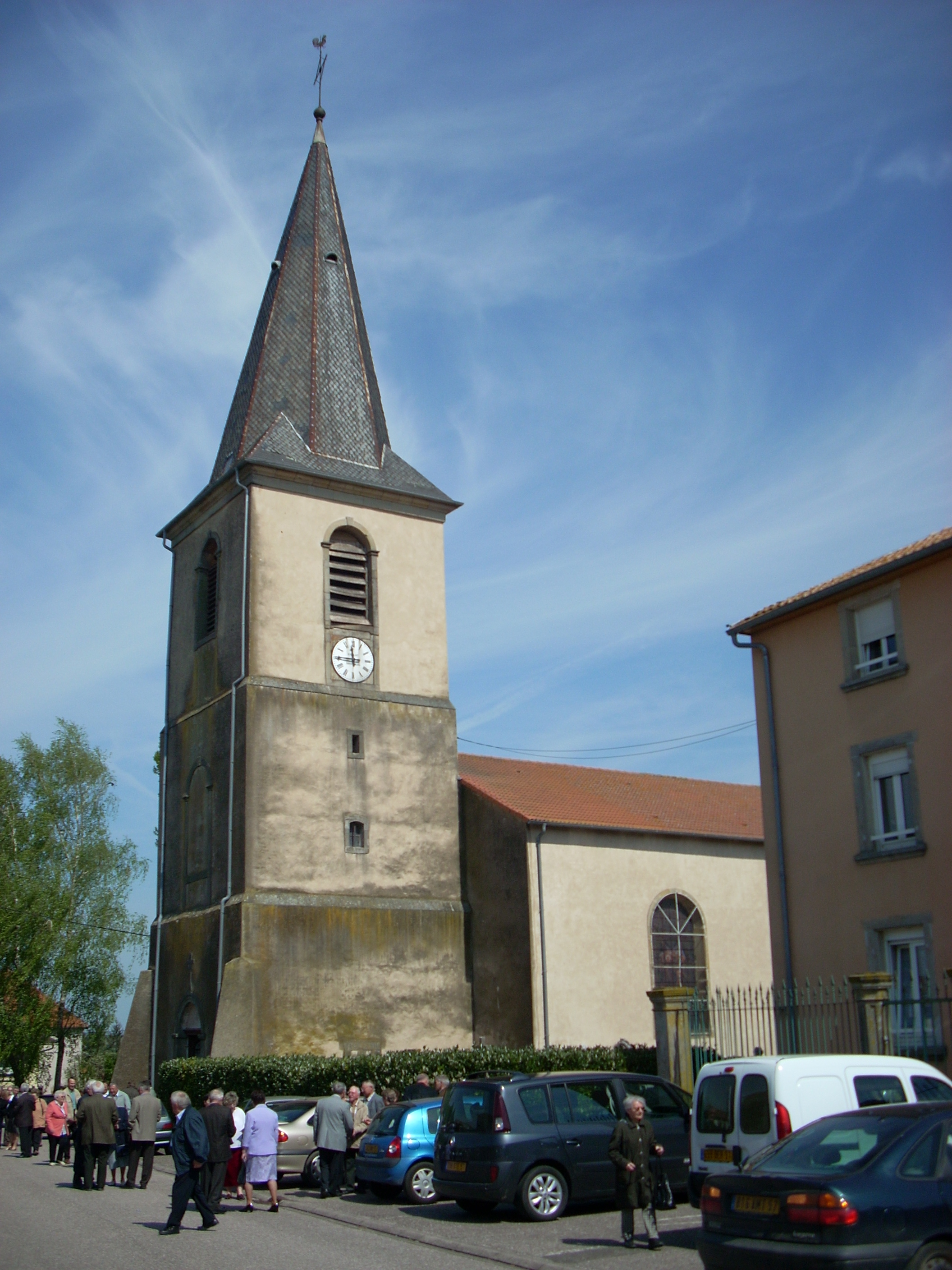
- The church in Maizières-lès-Vic

- Coat of arms
- Location of Maizières-lès-Vic
- Location within France Location within Grand Est
- Coordinates: 48°43′11″N 6°46′33″E
- Country: France
- Region: Grand Est
- Department: Moselle
- Arrondissement: Sarrebourg-Château-Salins
- Canton: Le Saulnois
- Intercommunality: CC du Saulnois

Government
  - Mayor (2024–2026): Solange Bernier
- Area^{1}: 25.99 km^{2} (10.03 sq mi)
- Elevation: 240 m (790 ft)
- Highest elevation: 299 m (981 ft)
- Lowest elevation: 217 m (712 ft)
- Population (2023): 464
  - Density: 17.9/km^{2} (46.2/sq mi)
- Time zone: UTC+01:00 (CET)
  - Summer (DST): UTC+02:00 (CEST)
- INSEE/Postal code: 57434 /57810
- ^{1} French Land Register data, which excludes lakes, ponds, glaciers > 1 km^{2} (0.386 sq mi or 247 acres) and river estuaries.

Maizières-lès-Vic (French pronunciation: [mɛzjɛʁ lɛ vik], literally Maizières near Vic; German: Machern bei Wich) is a commune in the Moselle department in Grand Est in north-eastern France.

== See also ==
- Communes of the Moselle department
- Parc naturel régional de Lorraine
