= Torcheville =

- Commune
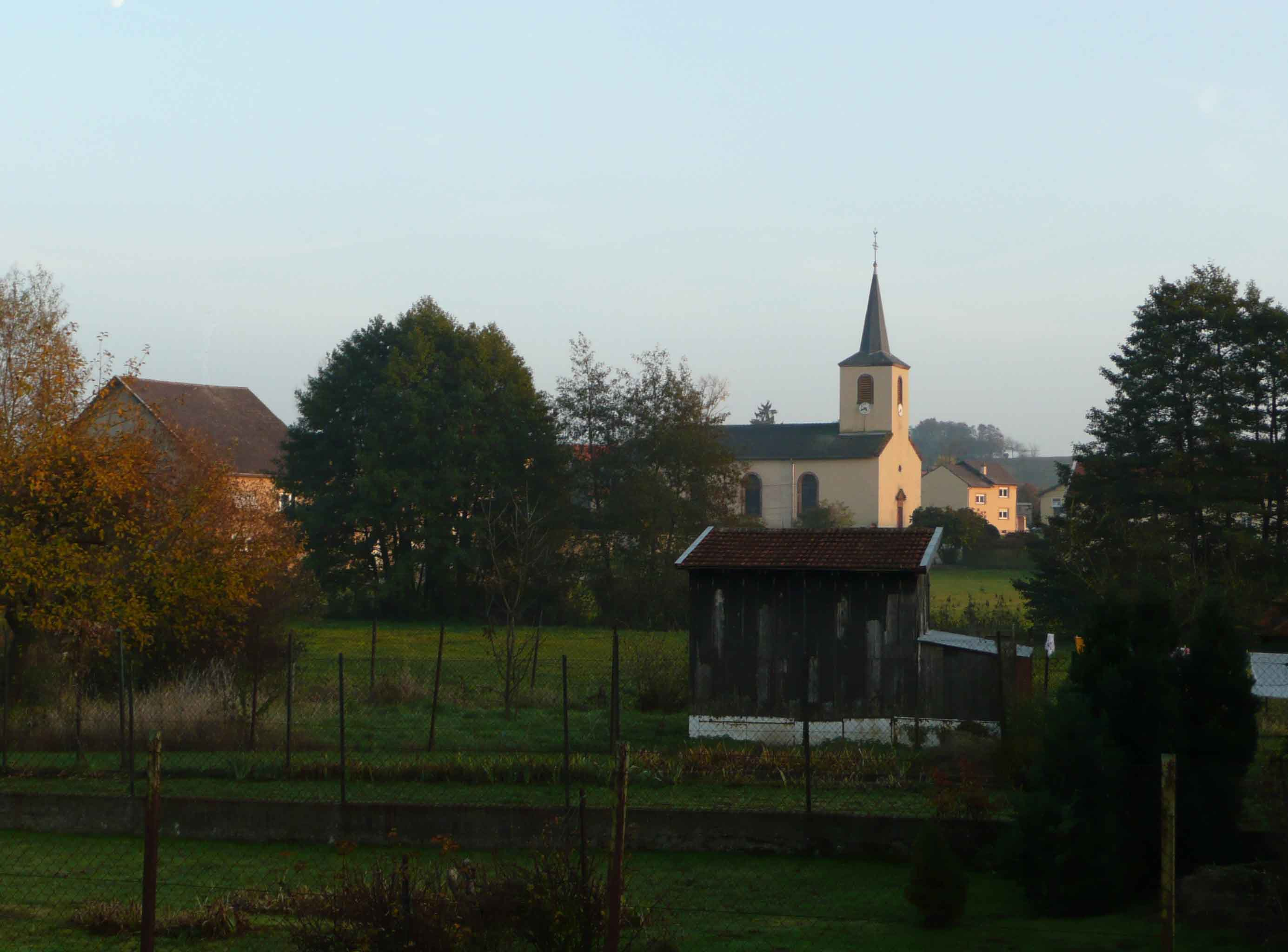
- The church and surroundings in Torcheville

- Coat of arms
- Location of Torcheville
- Location within France Location within Grand Est
- Coordinates: 48°54′38″N 6°50′58″E
- Country: France
- Region: Grand Est
- Department: Moselle
- Arrondissement: Sarrebourg-Château-Salins
- Canton: Le Saulnois
- Intercommunality: CC du Saulnois

Government
  - Mayor (2020–2026): Laurent Friche
- Area^{1}: 6.14 km^{2} (2.37 sq mi)
- Population (2023): 119
  - Density: 19.4/km^{2} (50.2/sq mi)
- Time zone: UTC+01:00 (CET)
  - Summer (DST): UTC+02:00 (CEST)
- INSEE/Postal code: 57675 /57670
- ^{1} French Land Register data, which excludes lakes, ponds, glaciers > 1 km^{2} (0.386 sq mi or 247 acres) and river estuaries.

Torcheville (French pronunciation: [tɔʁʃəvil]; German: Dorsweiler; lit. "torch-village") is a commune in the Moselle department in Grand Est in north-eastern France.

== See also ==
- Communes of the Moselle department
- Parc naturel régional de Lorraine
