= Rorbach-lès-Dieuze =

- Commune
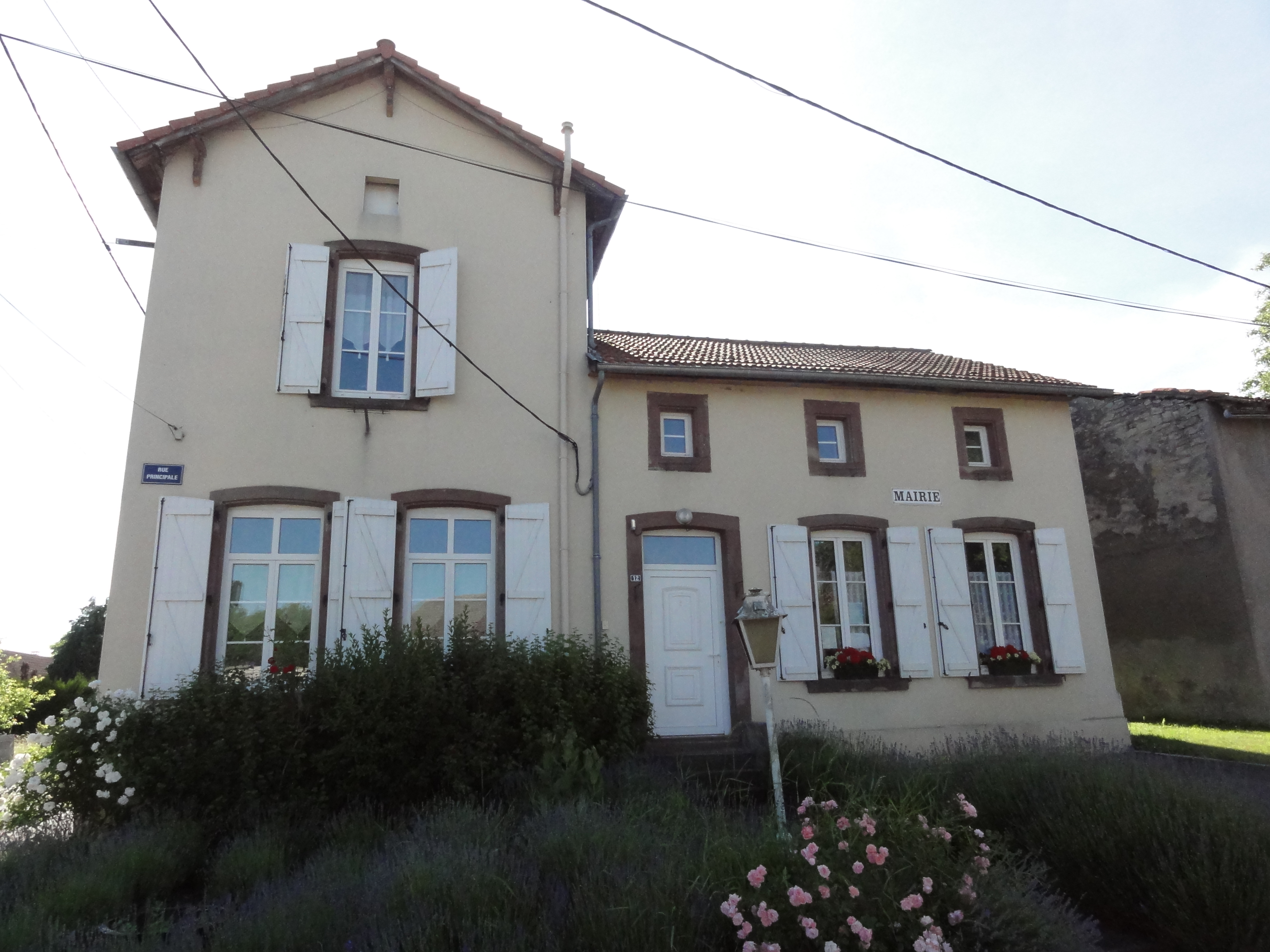
- The town hall in Rorbach-lès-Dieuze

- Coat of arms
- Location of Rorbach-lès-Dieuze
- Location within France Location within Grand Est
- Coordinates: 48°49′51″N 6°50′37″E
- Country: France
- Region: Grand Est
- Department: Moselle
- Arrondissement: Sarrebourg-Château-Salins
- Canton: Le Saulnois
- Intercommunality: CC du Saulnois

Government
  - Mayor (2020–2026): Étienne Bouché
- Area^{1}: 4.21 km^{2} (1.63 sq mi)
- Elevation: 227 m (745 ft)
- Highest elevation: 252 m (827 ft)
- Lowest elevation: 217 m (712 ft)
- Population (2023): 48
  - Density: 11/km^{2} (30/sq mi)
- Time zone: UTC+01:00 (CET)
  - Summer (DST): UTC+02:00 (CEST)
- INSEE/Postal code: 57595 /57260
- ^{1} French Land Register data, which excludes lakes, ponds, glaciers > 1 km^{2} (0.386 sq mi or 247 acres) and river estuaries.

Rorbach-lès-Dieuze (French pronunciation: [ʁɔʁbak lɛ djøz], literally Rorbach near Dieuze; German: Rohrbach bei Duß) is a commune in the Moselle department in Grand Est in north-eastern France.

== See also ==
- Communes of the Moselle department
- Parc naturel régional de Lorraine
