= Lidrezing =

- Commune
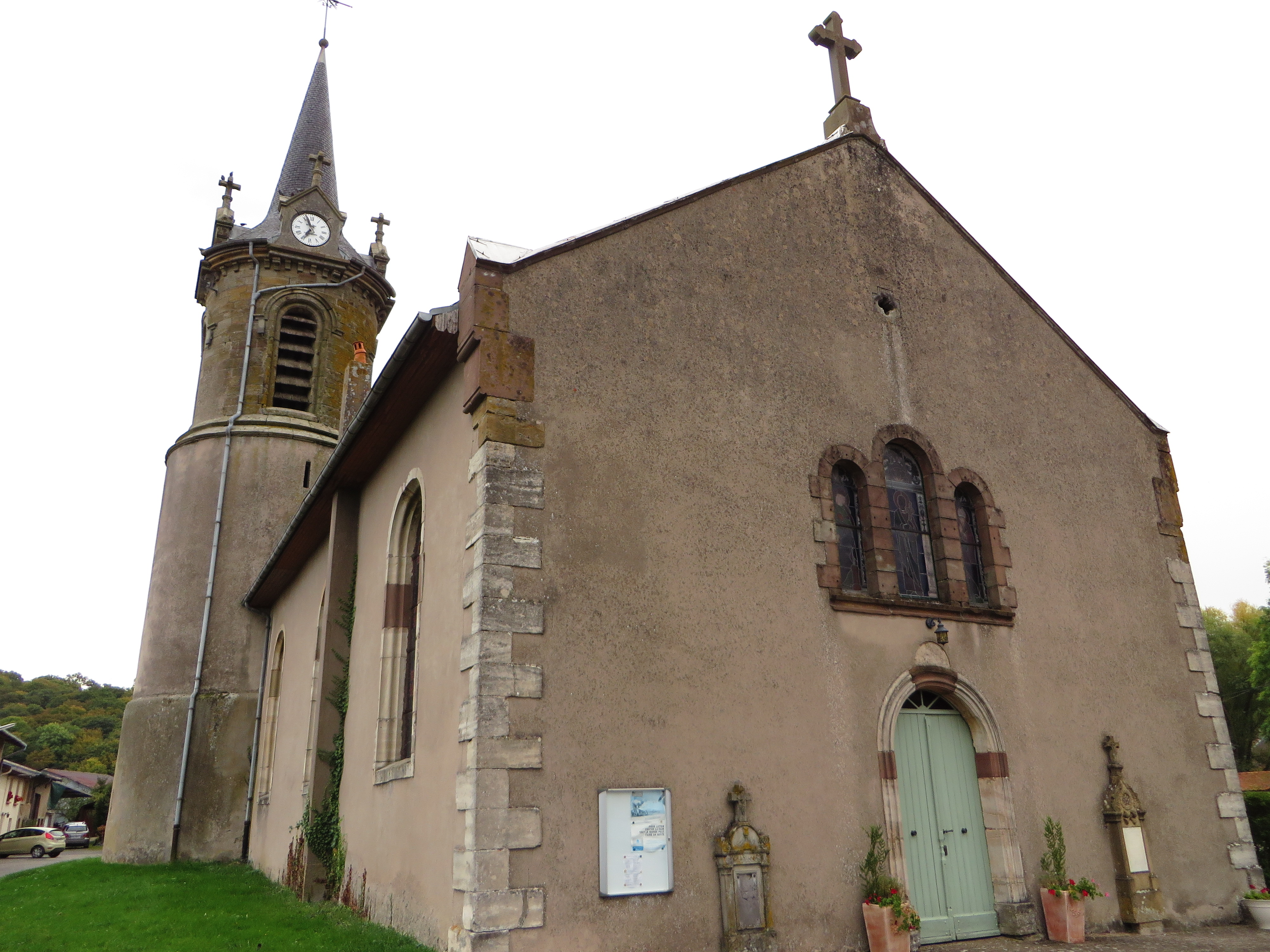
- The church in Lidrezing

- Coat of arms
- Location of Lidrezing
- Location within France Location within Grand Est
- Coordinates: 48°53′02″N 6°41′55″E
- Country: France
- Region: Grand Est
- Department: Moselle
- Arrondissement: Sarrebourg-Château-Salins
- Canton: Le Saulnois
- Intercommunality: CC du Saulnois

Government
  - Mayor (2020–2026): Pascal Durrenberger
- Area^{1}: 10.04 km^{2} (3.88 sq mi)
- Elevation: 104 m (341 ft)
- Highest elevation: 346 m (1,135 ft)
- Lowest elevation: 242 m (794 ft)
- Population (2023): 80
  - Density: 8.0/km^{2} (21/sq mi)
- Time zone: UTC+01:00 (CET)
  - Summer (DST): UTC+02:00 (CEST)
- INSEE/Postal code: 57401 /57340
- ^{1} French Land Register data, which excludes lakes, ponds, glaciers > 1 km^{2} (0.386 sq mi or 247 acres) and river estuaries.

Lidrezing (French pronunciation: [lidʁəzɛ̃]; German: Liedersingen) is a commune in the Moselle department in Grand Est in north-eastern France.

== See also ==
- Communes of the Moselle department
- Parc naturel régional de Lorraine
