= Insviller =

- Commune
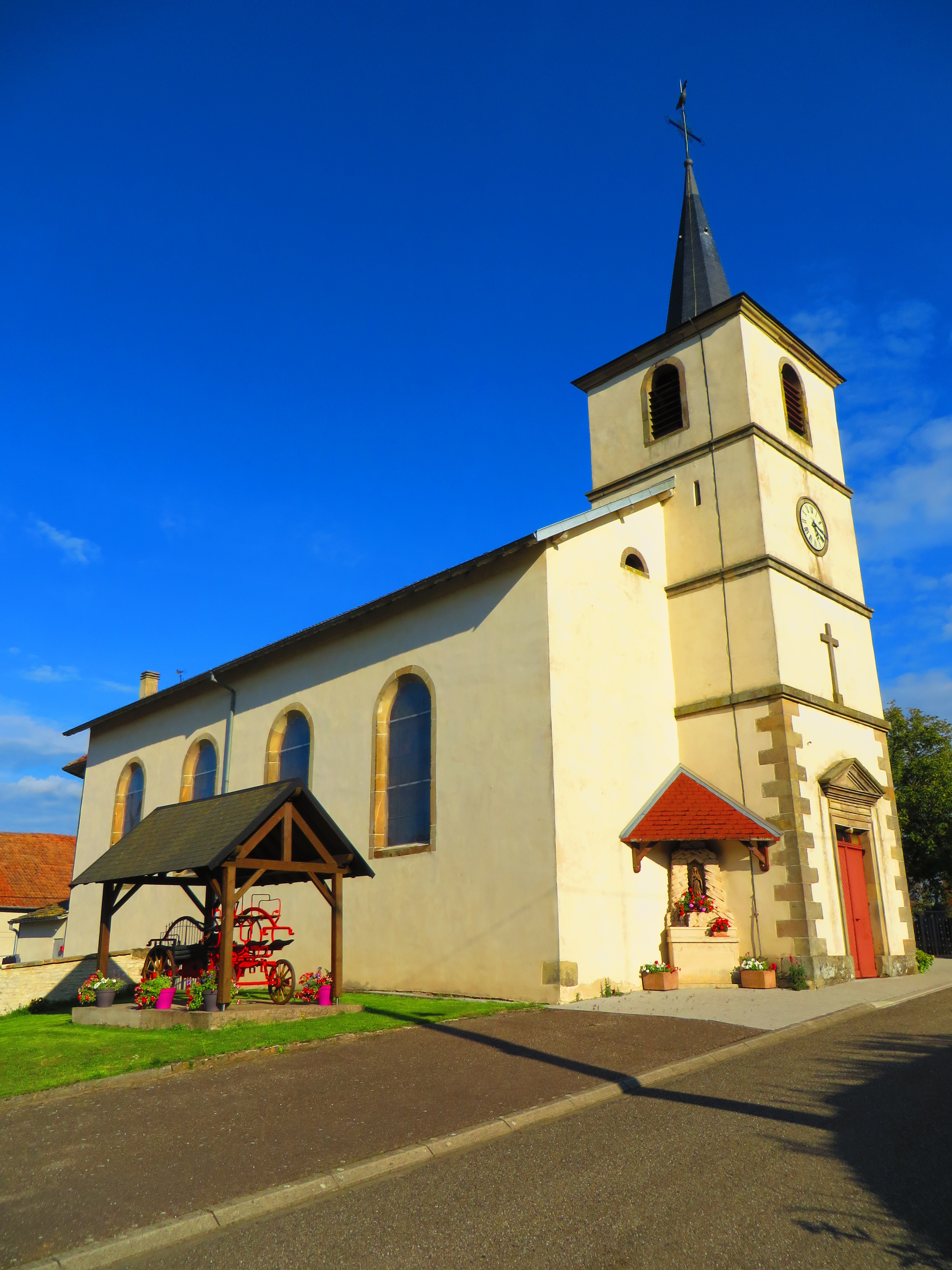
- The church in Insviller

- Coat of arms
- Location of Insviller
- Location within France Location within Grand Est
- Coordinates: 48°53′19″N 6°53′50″E
- Country: France
- Region: Grand Est
- Department: Moselle
- Arrondissement: Sarrebourg-Château-Salins
- Canton: Le Saulnois
- Intercommunality: CC du Saulnois

Government
  - Mayor (2020–2026): Sylvie Bouschbacher
- Area^{1}: 8.34 km^{2} (3.22 sq mi)
- Elevation: 230 m (750 ft)
- Highest elevation: 259 m (850 ft)
- Lowest elevation: 218 m (715 ft)
- Population (2023): 168
  - Density: 20.1/km^{2} (52.2/sq mi)
- Time zone: UTC+01:00 (CET)
  - Summer (DST): UTC+02:00 (CEST)
- INSEE/Postal code: 57347 /57670
- ^{1} French Land Register data, which excludes lakes, ponds, glaciers > 1 km^{2} (0.386 sq mi or 247 acres) and river estuaries.

Insviller (French pronunciation: [insvilɛʁ]; German: Insweiler) is a commune in the Moselle department in Grand Est in north-eastern France.

== See also ==
- Communes of the Moselle department
- Parc naturel régional de Lorraine
