= Morville-lès-Vic =

- Commune
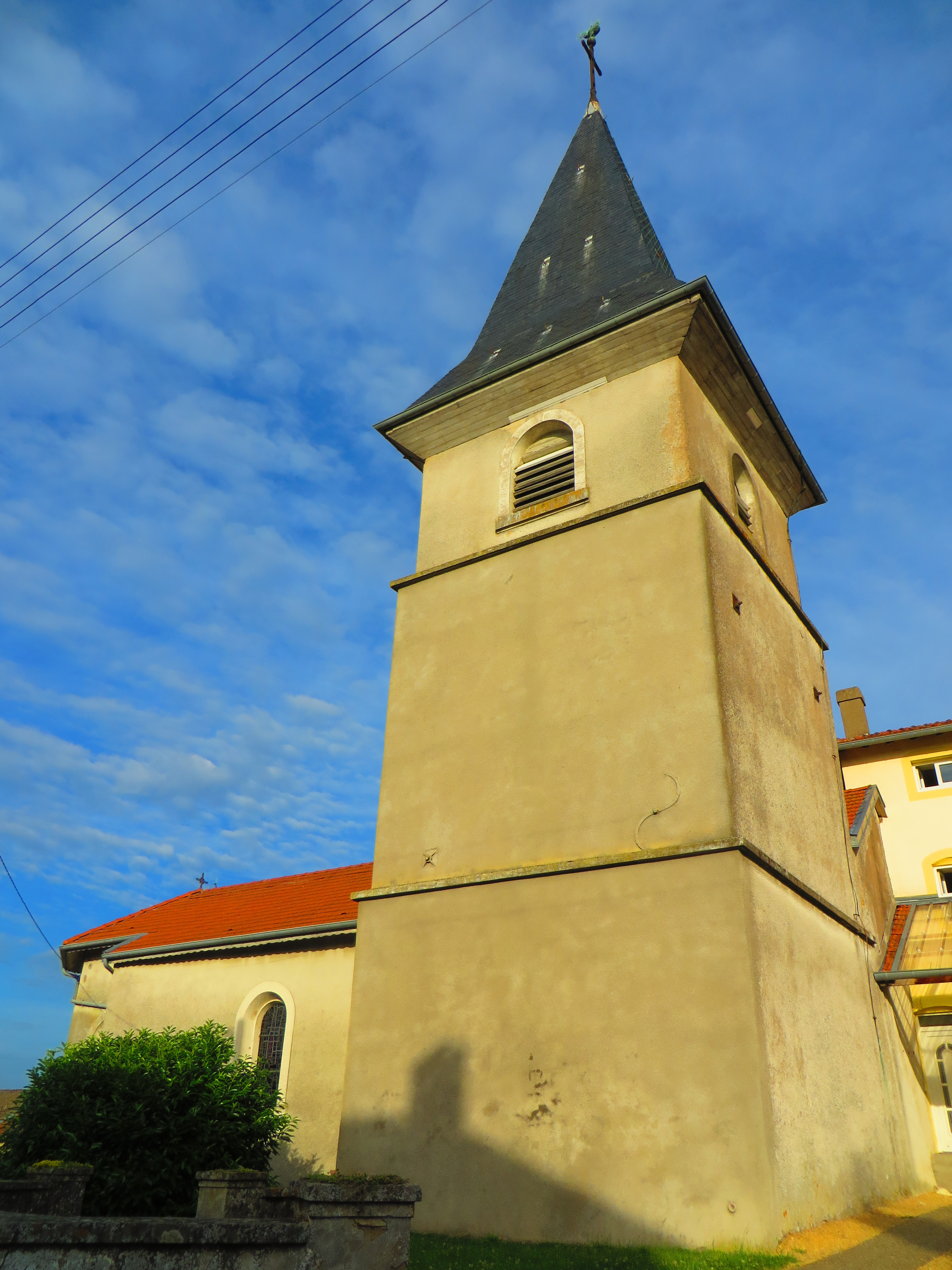
- The church in Morville-lès-Vic

- Coat of arms
- Location of Morville-lès-Vic
- Location within France Location within Grand Est
- Coordinates: 48°48′57″N 6°32′50″E
- Country: France
- Region: Grand Est
- Department: Moselle
- Arrondissement: Sarrebourg-Château-Salins
- Canton: Le Saulnois
- Intercommunality: CC du Saulnois

Government
  - Mayor (2020–2026): Arnaud Noel
- Area^{1}: 8.14 km^{2} (3.14 sq mi)
- Elevation: 255 m (837 ft)
- Highest elevation: 317 m (1,040 ft)
- Lowest elevation: 220 m (720 ft)
- Population (2023): 105
  - Density: 12.9/km^{2} (33.4/sq mi)
- Time zone: UTC+01:00 (CET)
  - Summer (DST): UTC+02:00 (CEST)
- INSEE/Postal code: 57485 /57170
- ^{1} French Land Register data, which excludes lakes, ponds, glaciers > 1 km^{2} (0.386 sq mi or 247 acres) and river estuaries.

Morville-lès-Vic (French pronunciation: [mɔʁvil lɛ vik], literally Morville near Vic; German: Morsheim) is a commune in the Moselle department in Grand Est in northeastern France.

== See also ==
- Communes of the Moselle department
- Parc naturel régional de Lorraine
