= Haraucourt-sur-Seille =

- Commune
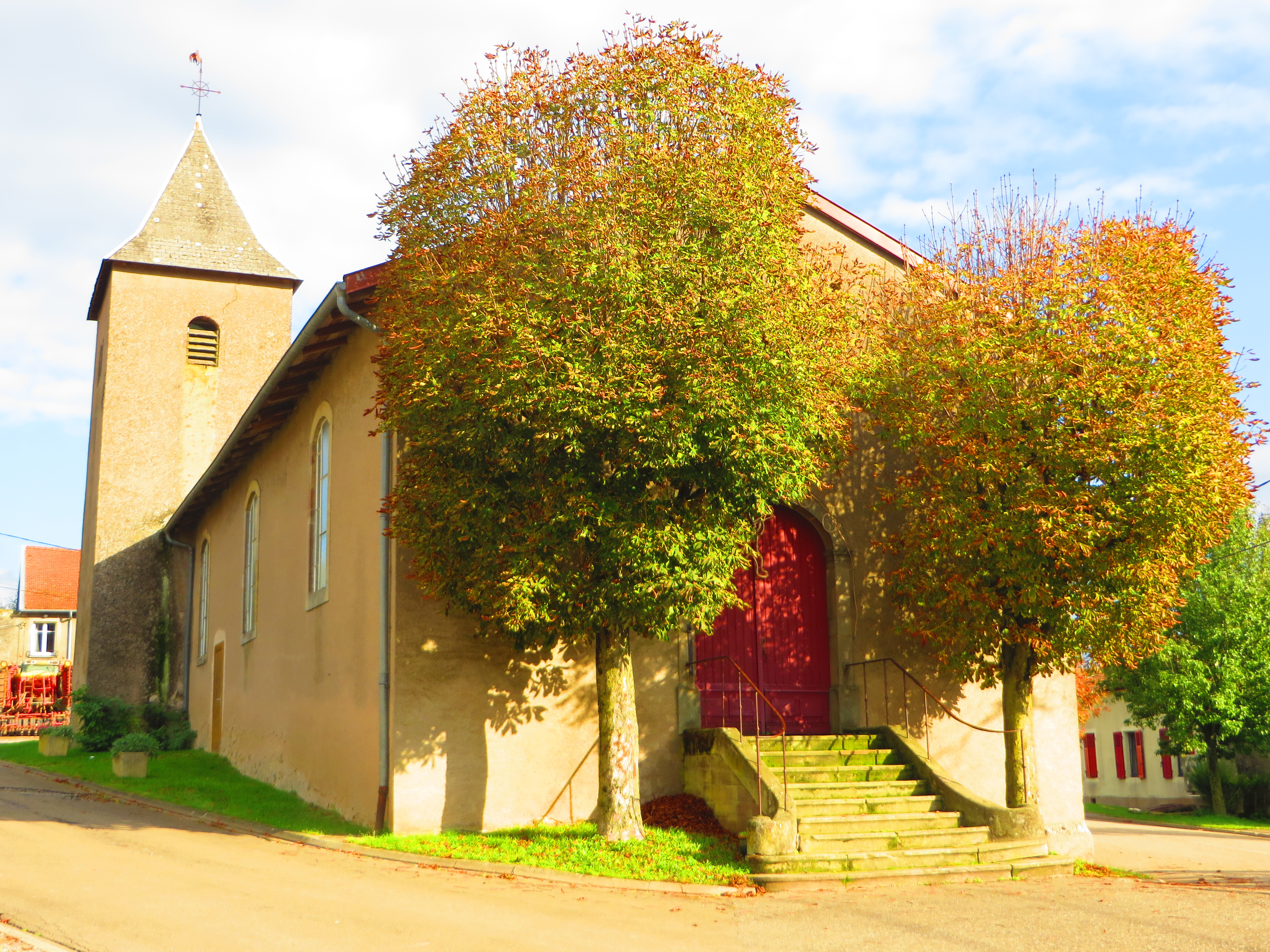
- The church in Haraucourt-sur-Seille

- Coat of arms
- Location of Haraucourt-sur-Seille
- Location within France Location within Grand Est
- Coordinates: 48°48′39″N 6°36′20″E
- Country: France
- Region: Grand Est
- Department: Moselle
- Arrondissement: Sarrebourg-Château-Salins
- Canton: Le Saulnois
- Intercommunality: CC du Saulnois

Government
  - Mayor (2020–2026): Annette Jost
- Area^{1}: 8.08 km^{2} (3.12 sq mi)
- Elevation: 220 m (720 ft)
- Highest elevation: 324 m (1,063 ft)
- Lowest elevation: 199 m (653 ft)
- Population (2023): 111
  - Density: 13.7/km^{2} (35.6/sq mi)
- Time zone: UTC+01:00 (CET)
  - Summer (DST): UTC+02:00 (CEST)
- INSEE/Postal code: 57295 /57630
- ^{1} French Land Register data, which excludes lakes, ponds, glaciers > 1 km^{2} (0.386 sq mi or 247 acres) and river estuaries.

Haraucourt-sur-Seille (French pronunciation: [aʁokuʁ syʁ sɛj]; German: Haraldshofen) is a commune in the Moselle department in Grand Est in north-eastern France.

== See also ==
- Communes of the Moselle department
- Parc naturel régional de Lorraine
