= Moyenvic =

- Commune
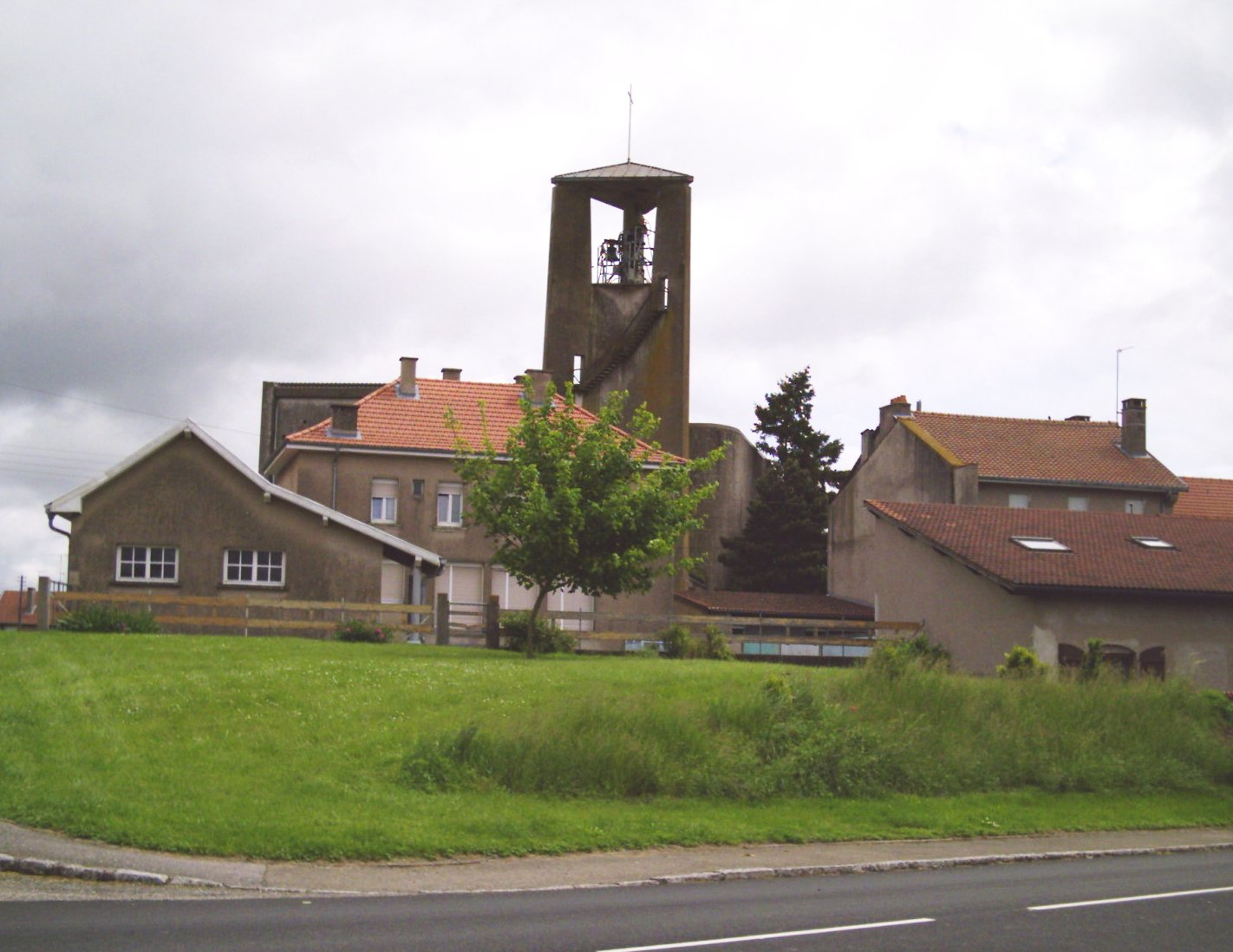
- A general view of Moyenvic

- Coat of arms
- Location of Moyenvic
- Location within France Location within Grand Est
- Coordinates: 48°46′41″N 6°33′47″E
- Country: France
- Region: Grand Est
- Department: Moselle
- Arrondissement: Sarrebourg-Château-Salins
- Canton: Le Saulnois
- Intercommunality: CC du Saulnois

Government
  - Mayor (2020–2026): Jean-Marie Simerman
- Area^{1}: 14.48 km^{2} (5.59 sq mi)
- Elevation: 208 m (682 ft)
- Highest elevation: 317 m (1,040 ft)
- Lowest elevation: 198 m (650 ft)
- Population (2023): 311
  - Density: 21.5/km^{2} (55.6/sq mi)
- Time zone: UTC+01:00 (CET)
  - Summer (DST): UTC+02:00 (CEST)
- INSEE/Postal code: 57490 /57630
- ^{1} French Land Register data, which excludes lakes, ponds, glaciers > 1 km^{2} (0.386 sq mi or 247 acres) and river estuaries.

Moyenvic (French pronunciation: [mwajɛ̃vik]; German: Medewich) is a commune in the Moselle department in Grand Est in north-eastern France.

== See also ==
- Communes of the Moselle department
- Parc naturel régional de Lorraine
