= Blanche-Église =

- Commune
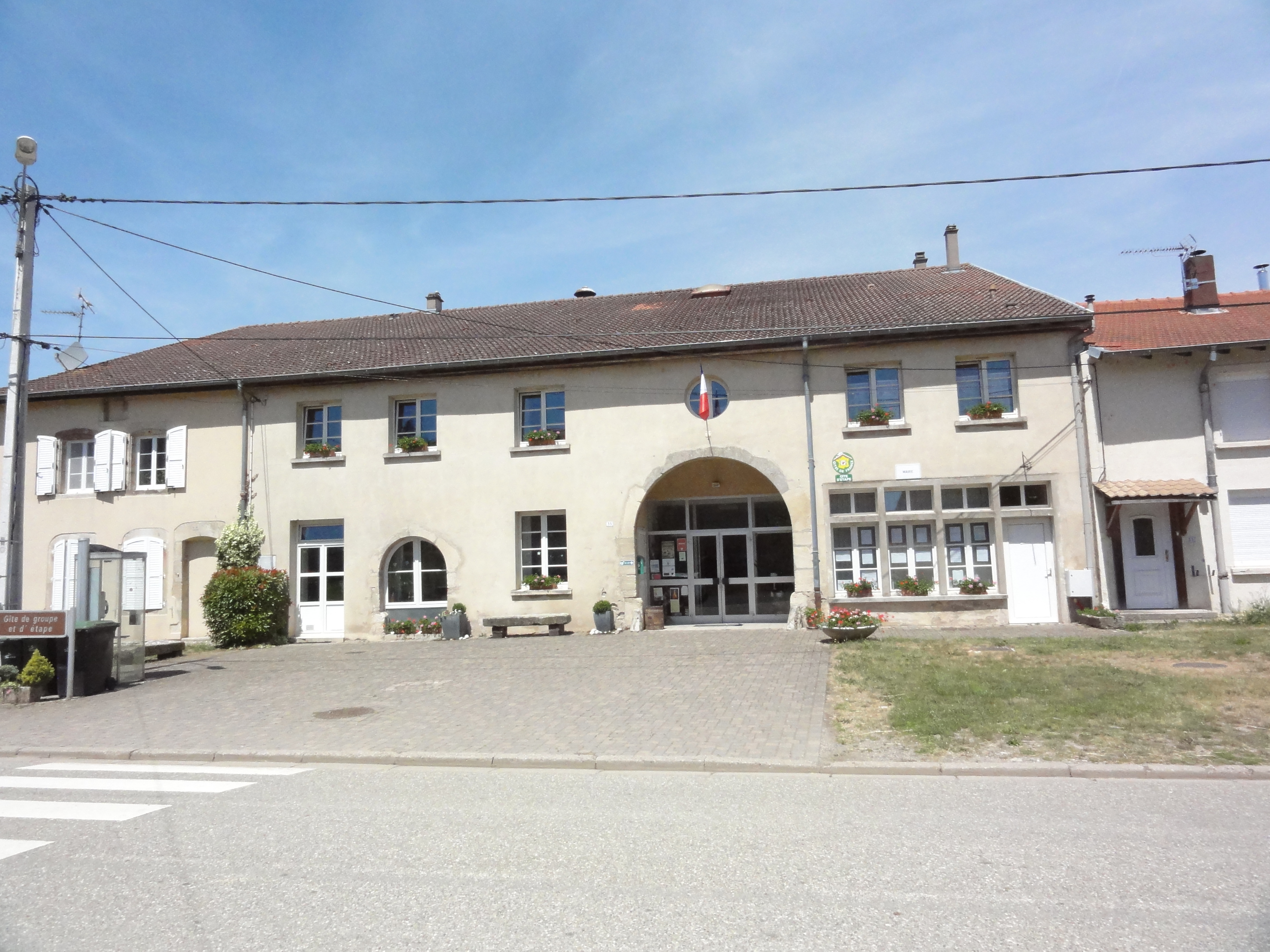
- The town hall in Blanche-Église

- Coat of arms
- Location of Blanche-Église
- Location within France Location within Grand Est
- Coordinates: 48°47′33″N 6°40′25″E
- Country: France
- Region: Grand Est
- Department: Moselle
- Arrondissement: Sarrebourg-Château-Salins
- Canton: Le Saulnois
- Intercommunality: CC Saulnois

Government
  - Mayor (2020–2026): Alain Boubel
- Area^{1}: 6.89 km^{2} (2.66 sq mi)
- Elevation: 203 m (666 ft)
- Highest elevation: 238 m (781 ft)
- Lowest elevation: 203 m (666 ft)
- Population (2023): 102
  - Density: 14.8/km^{2} (38.3/sq mi)
- Time zone: UTC+01:00 (CET)
  - Summer (DST): UTC+02:00 (CEST)
- INSEE/Postal code: 57090 /57260
- ^{1} French Land Register data, which excludes lakes, ponds, glaciers > 1 km^{2} (0.386 sq mi or 247 acres) and river estuaries.

Blanche-Église (French pronunciation: [blɑ̃ʃ eɡliz], literally White Church; German: Weißkirchen) is a commune in the Moselle department in Grand Est in northeastern France.

== Population ==
Historical population
Year	Pop.	±% p.a.
1968	83	—
1975	93	+1.64%
1982	110	+2.43%
1990	115	+0.56%
1999	115	+0.00%
2007	134	+1.93%
2012	126	−1.22%
2017	113	−2.15%
2023	102	−1.69%
Source: INSEE

== See also ==
- Communes of the Moselle department
- Parc naturel régional de Lorraine
