= Marsal, Moselle =

Marsal
- Commune
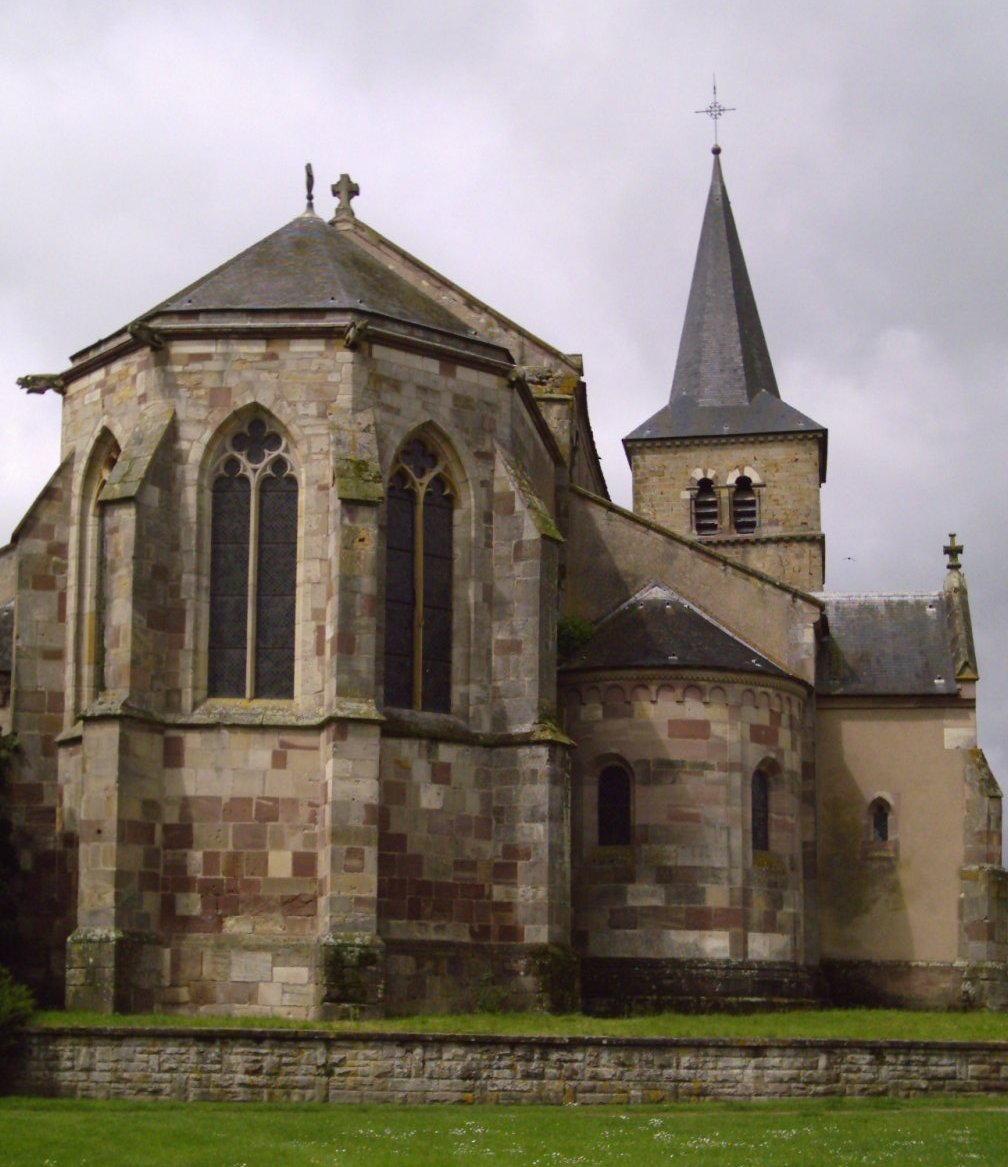
- The church in Marsal

- Coat of arms
- Location of Marsal
- Location within France Location within Grand Est
- Coordinates: 48°47′24″N 6°36′35″E
- Country: France
- Region: Grand Est
- Department: Moselle
- Arrondissement: Sarrebourg-Château-Salins
- Canton: Le Saulnois
- Intercommunality: CC du Saulnois

Government
  - Mayor (2021–2026): Didier Bernard
- Area^{1}: 11.11 km^{2} (4.29 sq mi)
- Elevation: 225 m (738 ft)
- Highest elevation: 307 m (1,007 ft)
- Lowest elevation: 199 m (653 ft)
- Population (2023): 229
  - Density: 20.6/km^{2} (53.4/sq mi)
- Time zone: UTC+01:00 (CET)
  - Summer (DST): UTC+02:00 (CEST)
- INSEE/Postal code: 57448 /57630
- ^{1} French Land Register data, which excludes lakes, ponds, glaciers > 1 km^{2} (0.386 sq mi or 247 acres) and river estuaries.

Marsal (French pronunciation: [maʁsal]; German: Salzmar) is a commune in the Moselle department in Grand Est in north-eastern France.

== Geography ==
Marsal is located on a marshy alluvial plain, surrounded by two branches of the Seille River. This old town on the ancient Roman road from Metz to Strasbourg was marked by salt mining, emerging in the form of salt springs.

== Toponymy ==
Marsal's name in Roman times was Marosallum. The word Marosallum is a combination of two terms, one Gallic (maro) and the other Latin (sallum), which together mean approximately the Great Saltworks.

== History ==
Archaeological remains dating back to the Neolithic and Bronze Age have been discovered in the vicinity of Marsal.

An urban agglomeration called Marosallum developed in early Roman times. Marosallum was a stop on the Roman road linking Metz (Divodurum) to Strasbourg (Argentorate).

The ancient name of the town was shortened to Marsallum in Merovingian times. The town seems to have continued to derive its wealth from the salt works, as evidenced by the presence of a "place à sel" reported in 682 or 683.

From the 11th century onwards, the Bishopric of Metz and the Duchy of Lorraine fought over control of the region's saltworks.

The chronicles of Richer de Senones mention the existence in the 13th century of a young woman, nicknamed the Sybille de Marsal, who was reputed to live without eating. Bishop Jacques de Lorraine and a number of priests and gentlemen who accompanied him were unable, despite several days of observation, to discover who was feeding her.

On 2 September 1663 Louis XIV captured the town. Numerous documents testify to the capture of Marsal, such as a tapestry from the Gobelins called Réduction ou Reddition de Marsal, which relates the handing over of the keys of the town to the king. The tapestry is based on a model by Charles Le Brun. Jean de La Fontaine also wrote a sonnet about the capture of Marsal.

The king then entrusted the military engineer Vauban with the task of improving the fortifications.

Marsal's Ancien Régime military cemetery is where the remains of several disabled veterans of the Seven Years' War and the American Revolutionary War.

During World War I, Marsal was bombed in 1915.

Following the defeat of June 1940, Marsal was once again annexed to the German Reich. Most of the population was expelled and welcomed in the South of France. The village was not French again until 1945.

In 1968, the "Mage de Marsal" affair hit the headlines: two of the six children of Maurice Gérard, known as "Swami Matkormano", the guru who runs an esoteric community in his large building, and Josiane Gérard, known as "the high priestess Alféola", mysteriously disappeared.

== Demography ==
Historical population
Year	Pop.	±% p.a.
1968	301	—
1975	287	−0.68%
1982	280	−0.35%
1990	284	+0.18%
1999	289	+0.19%
2007	285	−0.17%
2012	252	−2.43%
2017	282	+2.28%
2023	229	−3.41%
Source: INSEE

== Culture and historical heritage ==
=== Sights and architecture ===
The Roman road that served Marosallum from opposite sides of the Seille valley.

The Salt Museum (Musée départemental du sel) presents salt production techniques, from prehistory to the present day.

La Porte de France (gate of France) was classified as a historic monument on 6 March 1928; dating back to 1663, the Notre-Dame gate defended the main access to Marsal and was extensively modified in the first half of the 17th century.

Maison du gouverneur de la saline (the house of the saltworks' governor) was built in 1625 by Jean La Hiere, it was modified in the 18th century, abandoned during the French Revolution and rebuilt in 1823–1824.

L'Arsenal was built in 1848, this 13-bay building, sold to private owners, has retained its original appearance.

Le Pavillon de Bourgogne from 1666, is a former barrack which became the headquarters of the civil hospice in 1813, then a girls' school in 1889. Today, it has been converted into rental accommodation.

La Place d'Armes was once home to the village's covered market, as well as the town hall and washhouse... Today, the square forms the center of the village, lined with notables' houses with 18th-century facades.

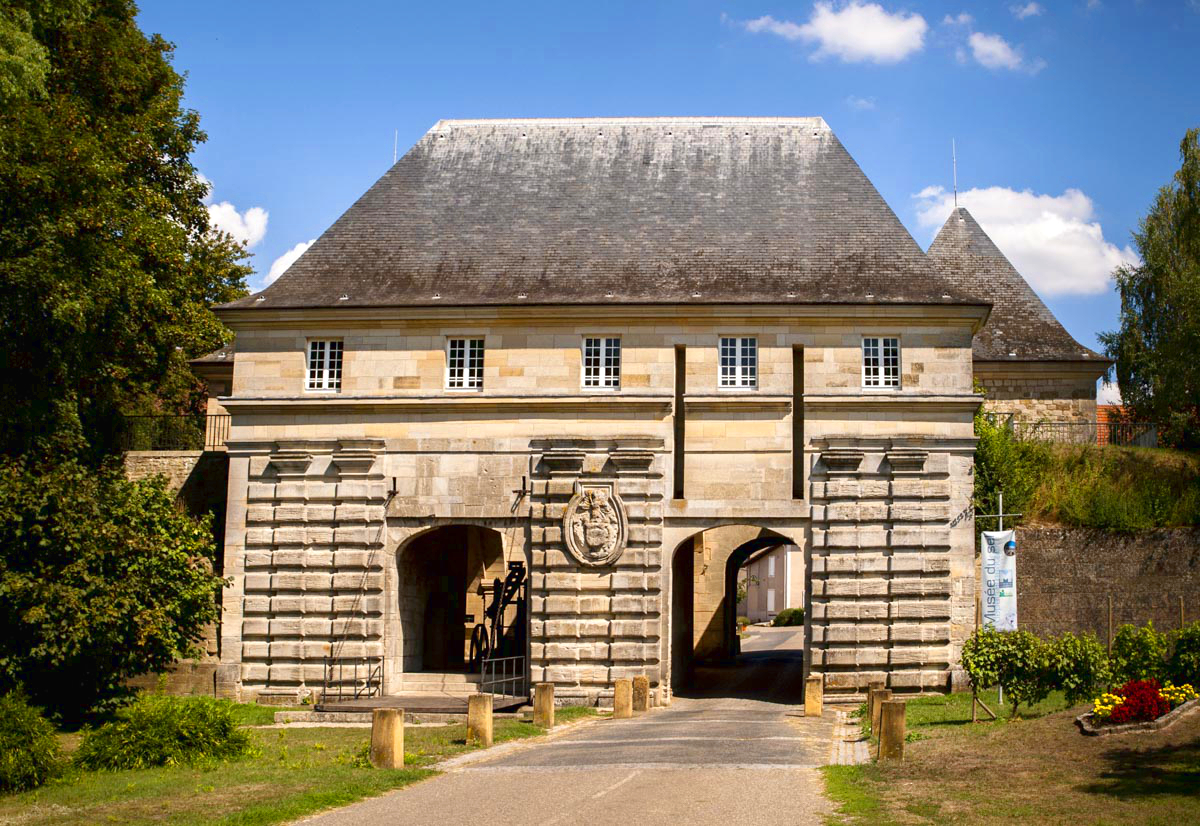
Porte de France

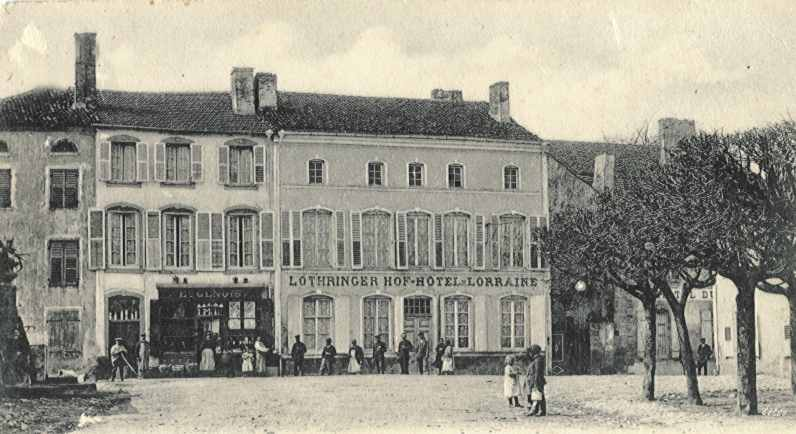
Place d'Armes

== See also ==
- Communes of the Moselle department
- Parc naturel régional de Lorraine
