= Lindre-Basse =

- Commune
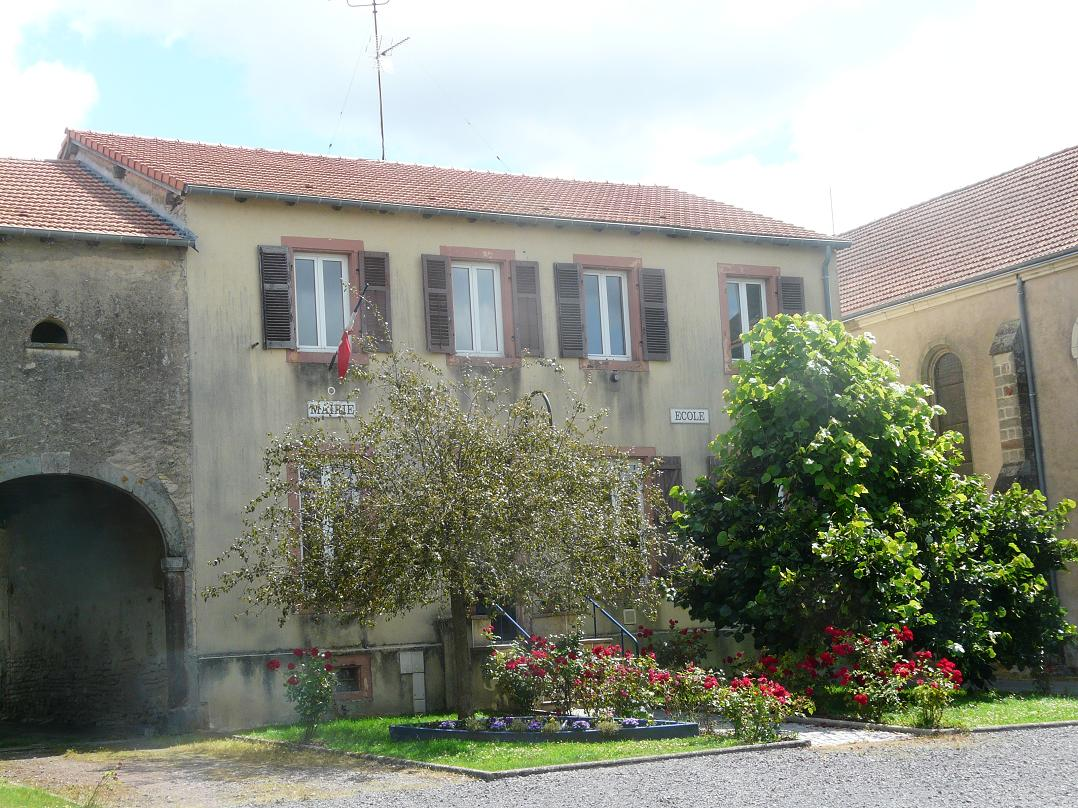
- The town hall and school in Lindre-Basse

- Coat of arms
- Location of Lindre-Basse
- Location within France Location within Grand Est
- Coordinates: 48°48′10″N 6°44′52″E
- Country: France
- Region: Grand Est
- Department: Moselle
- Arrondissement: Sarrebourg-Château-Salins
- Canton: Le Saulnois
- Intercommunality: CC du Saulnois

Government
  - Mayor (2020–2026): Rémy Hamant
- Area^{1}: 8.28 km^{2} (3.20 sq mi)
- Elevation: 210 m (690 ft)
- Highest elevation: 248 m (814 ft)
- Lowest elevation: 205 m (673 ft)
- Population (2023): 234
  - Density: 28.3/km^{2} (73.2/sq mi)
- Time zone: UTC+01:00 (CET)
  - Summer (DST): UTC+02:00 (CEST)
- INSEE/Postal code: 57404 /57260
- ^{1} French Land Register data, which excludes lakes, ponds, glaciers > 1 km^{2} (0.386 sq mi or 247 acres) and river estuaries.

Lindre-Basse (French pronunciation: [lɛ̃dʁ bas]; German: Nieder-Linder) is a commune in the Moselle department in Grand Est in north-eastern France.

== See also ==
- Communes of the Moselle department
- Parc naturel régional de Lorraine
