= Woëvre =

Natural region of Lorraine, France

Coordinates: 49°7′N 5°30′E

Designations

Ramsar Wetland
- Official name: Etangs de la Petite Woëvre
- Designated: 8 April 1991
- Reference no.: 515

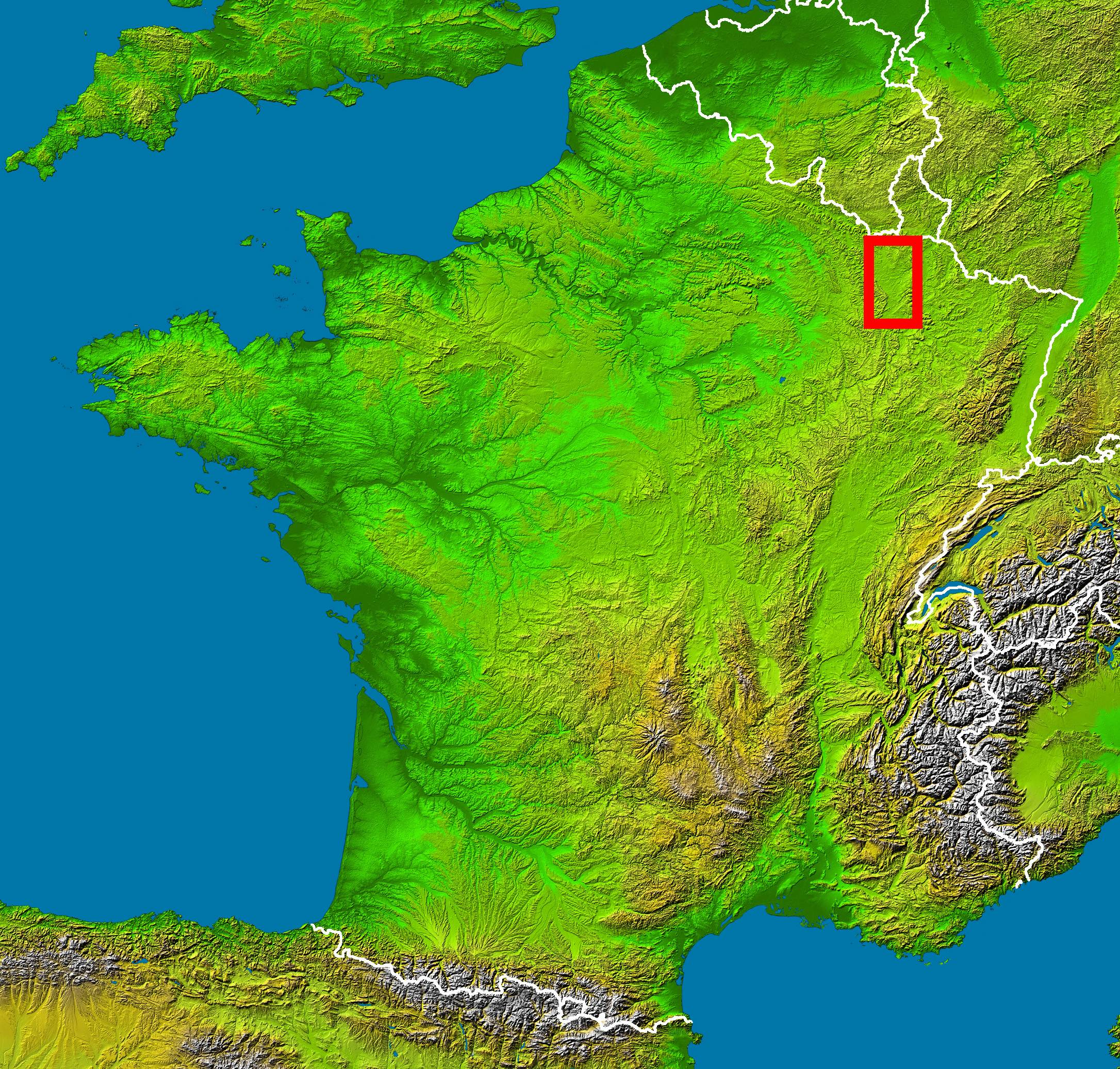
Location of the Woëvre

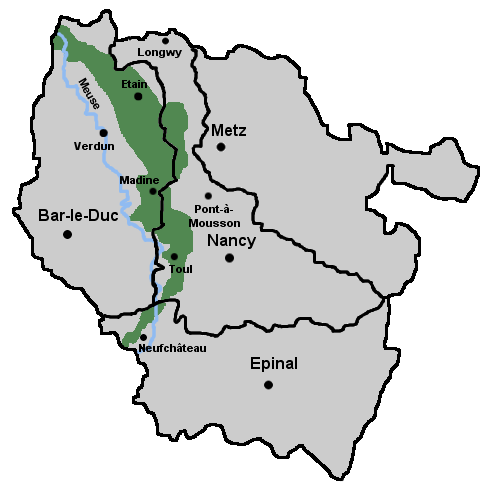
The Woëvre, in green

The Woëvre (French pronunciation: [(v)wavʁ]) (German: Waberland) is a natural region of Lorraine in northeastern France. It forms part of Lorraine plateau and lies largely in the department of Meuse. Along with the Côtes de Moselle, the Woëvre is one of the areas in Lorraine that receives the least rainfall; nonetheless, its river system is very important and feeds into the Lac de Madine.

== Location ==
It lies on the right bank of the river Meuse, from the valley of the Chiers in the north to the town of Neufchâteau in the south. To the west, the region follows the Meuse, and to the east, it extends into the neighboring department of Meurthe-et-Moselle. The Lac de Madine lies in the Woëvre, like does the western part of the Parc naturel régional de Lorraine. Neighboring natural regions include the Côtes de Meuse on the left bank of the Meuse, the Barrois to the south and the Côtes de Moselle to the east. The part French, part Belgian Gaume region lies to the north.

== Features ==
Since the Middle Ages, inhabitants along part of this system have used earthen levees to create ponds used for aquaculture, which now provide important refuges for migratory birds.

The region's soil includes layers of sandstone and limestone aquifers separated by impermeable clay. It is particularly forested, particularly with oak trees.

Two small pieces of land are still heavily contaminated from WWI and are designated part of Zone Rouge.

== Conservation ==
Certain areas are designated as "Zones naturelles d'intérêt écologique, faunistique et floristique", or ZNIEFFs, which marks them as particularly important to the preservation of France's ecological heritage either because of the plants or animals they support, their ecological role or their local or national importance. The "Conservatoire des sites lorraines" was created to protect endangered species, and it purchased most of the areas in 1994. Parts of the Woëvre have been designated as a protected Ramsar site since 1991.
