= Nubécourt =

- Commune
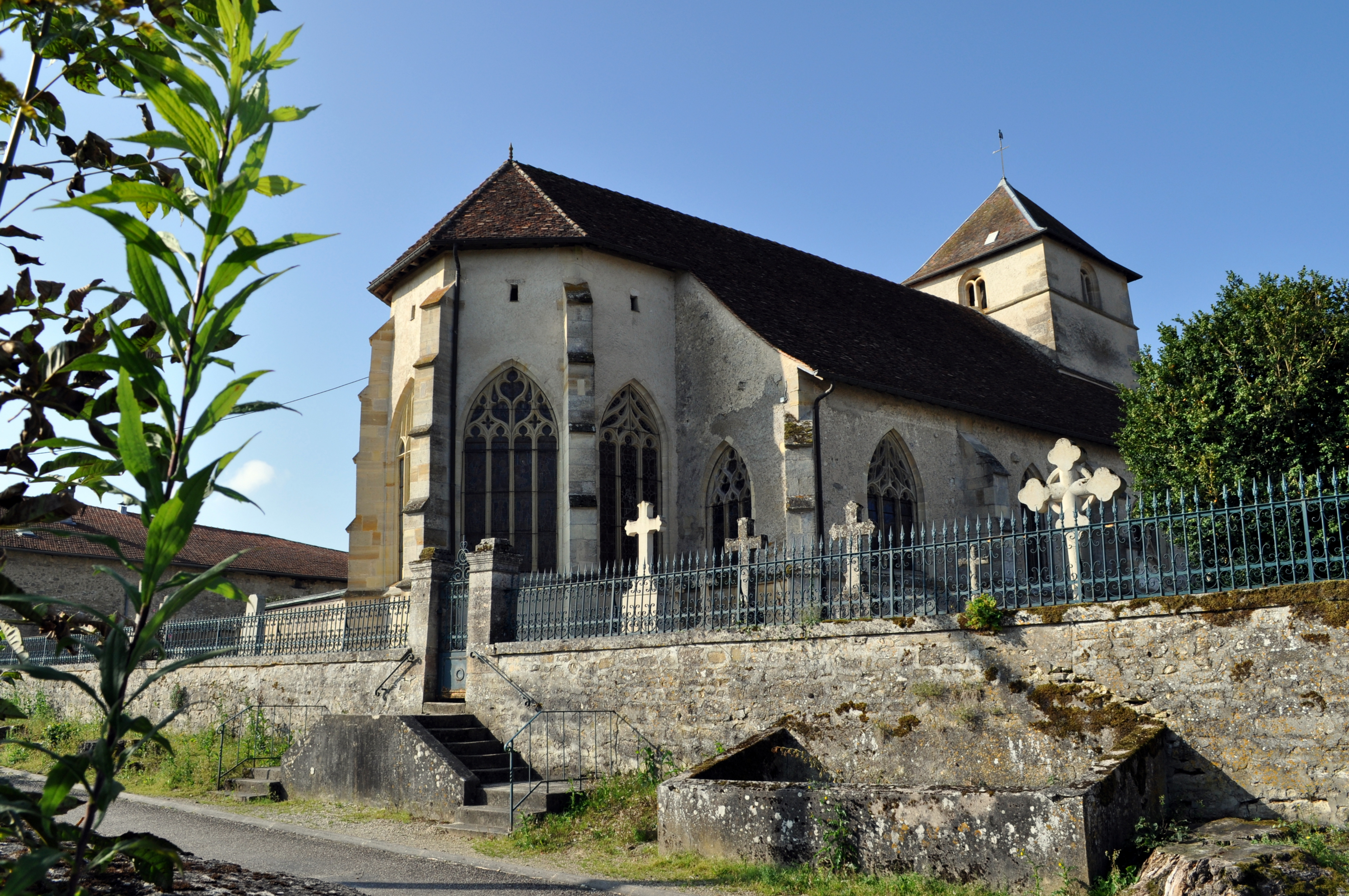
- The church in Nubécourt

- Coat of arms
- Location of Nubécourt
- Location within France Location within Grand Est
- Coordinates: 48°59′57″N 5°10′33″E
- Country: France
- Region: Grand Est
- Department: Meuse
- Arrondissement: Bar-le-Duc
- Canton: Dieue-sur-Meuse
- Intercommunality: CC de l'Aire à l'Argonne

Government
  - Mayor (2020–2026): Patrick Gross
- Area^{1}: 27.52 km^{2} (10.63 sq mi)
- Elevation: 225 m (738 ft)
- Highest elevation: 297 m (974 ft)
- Lowest elevation: 207 m (679 ft)
- Population (2023): 253
  - Density: 9.19/km^{2} (23.8/sq mi)
- Time zone: UTC+01:00 (CET)
  - Summer (DST): UTC+02:00 (CEST)
- INSEE/Postal code: 55389 /55250
- ^{1} French Land Register data, which excludes lakes, ponds, glaciers > 1 km^{2} (0.386 sq mi or 247 acres) and river estuaries.

Nubécourt (French pronunciation: [nybekuʁ]) is a commune in the Meuse department in Grand Est in north-eastern France. In January 1973, it absorbed the former communes Bulainville and Fleury-sur-Aire.

== See also ==
- Communes of the Meuse department
