= Courouvre =

- Commune
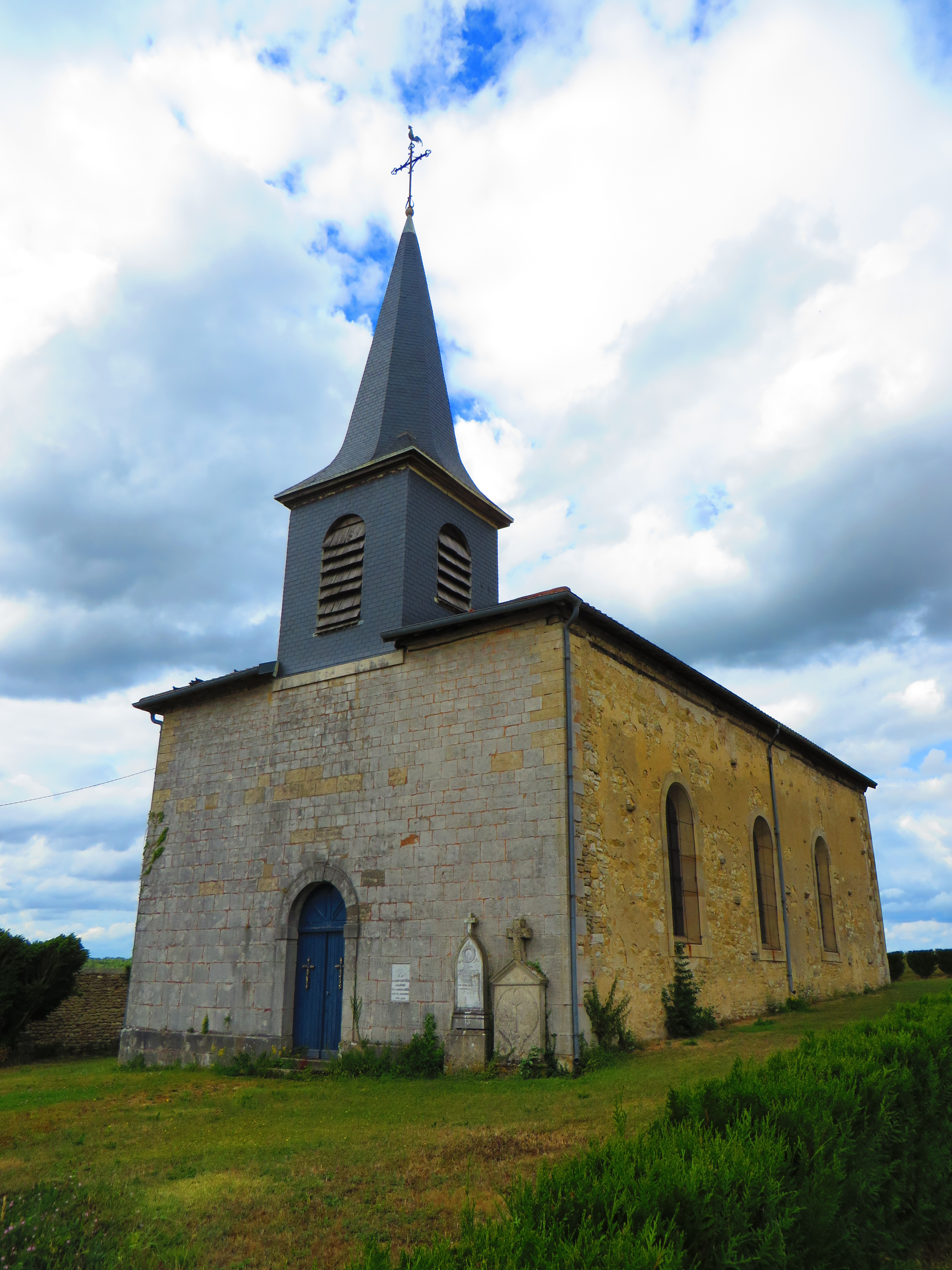
- The church in Courouvre

- Coat of arms
- Location of Courouvre
- Location within France Location within Grand Est
- Coordinates: 48°56′17″N 5°21′23″E
- Country: France
- Region: Grand Est
- Department: Meuse
- Arrondissement: Commercy
- Canton: Dieue-sur-Meuse
- Intercommunality: CC de l'Aire à l'Argonne

Government
  - Mayor (2020–2026): Francis Witz
- Area^{1}: 8.66 km^{2} (3.34 sq mi)
- Elevation: 325 m (1,066 ft)
- Highest elevation: 331 m (1,086 ft)
- Lowest elevation: 263 m (863 ft)
- Population (2023): 44
  - Density: 5.1/km^{2} (13/sq mi)
- Time zone: UTC+01:00 (CET)
  - Summer (DST): UTC+02:00 (CEST)
- INSEE/Postal code: 55129 /55260
- ^{1} French Land Register data, which excludes lakes, ponds, glaciers > 1 km^{2} (0.386 sq mi or 247 acres) and river estuaries.

Courouvre (French pronunciation: [kuʁuvʁ]) is a commune in the Meuse department in Grand Est in north-eastern France.

== See also ==
- Communes of the Meuse department
