= Baudrémont =

- Commune
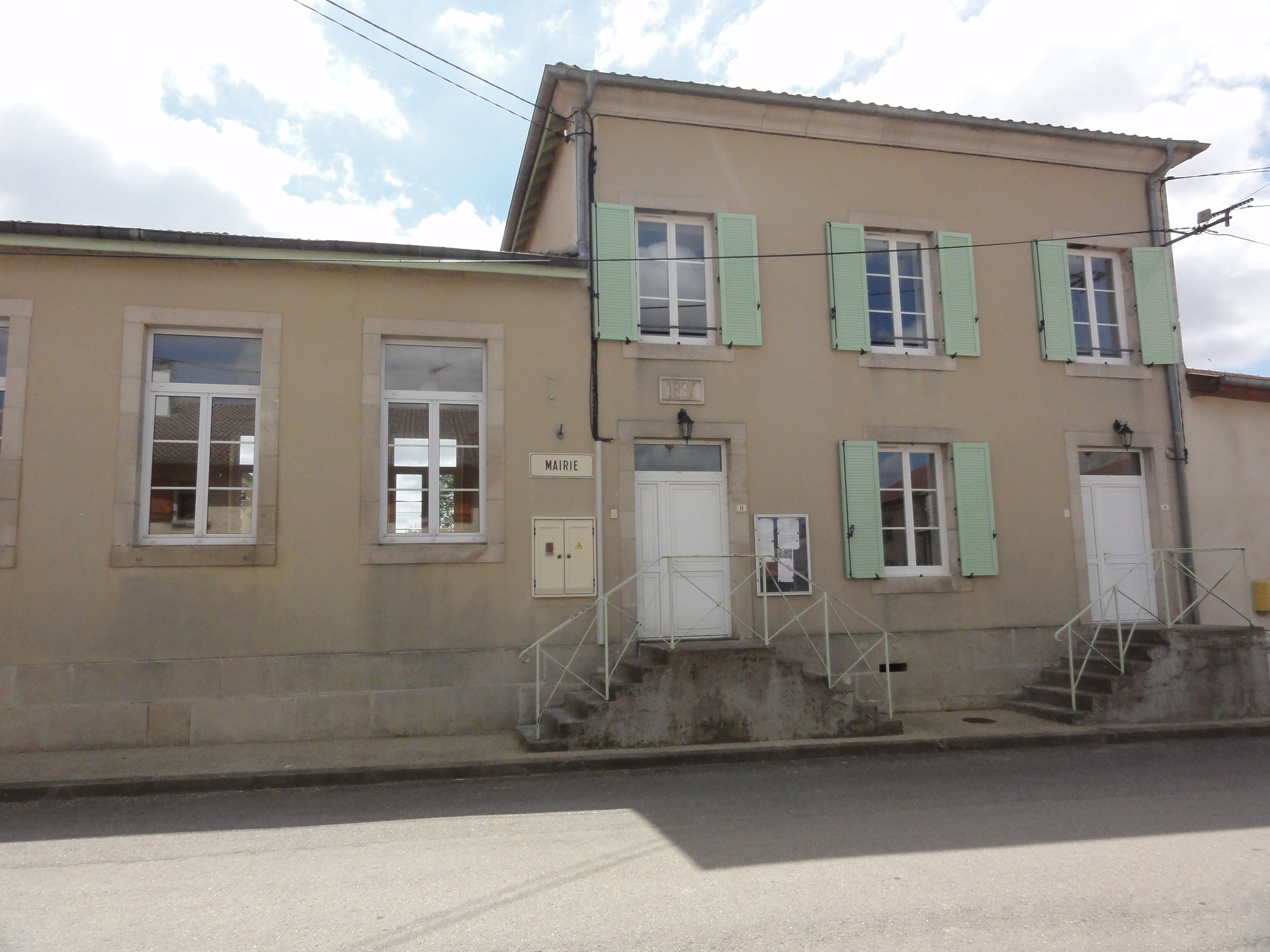
- The town hall in Baudrémont

- Coat of arms
- Location of Baudrémont
- Location within France Location within Grand Est
- Coordinates: 48°50′25″N 5°23′19″E
- Country: France
- Region: Grand Est
- Department: Meuse
- Arrondissement: Commercy
- Canton: Dieue-sur-Meuse

Government
  - Mayor (2020–2026): Brigitte Weisse
- Area^{1}: 6.81 km^{2} (2.63 sq mi)
- Elevation: 273 m (896 ft)
- Highest elevation: 352 m (1,155 ft)
- Lowest elevation: 268 m (879 ft)
- Population (2023): 44
  - Density: 6.5/km^{2} (17/sq mi)
- Time zone: UTC+01:00 (CET)
  - Summer (DST): UTC+02:00 (CEST)
- INSEE/Postal code: 55032 /55260
- ^{1} French Land Register data, which excludes lakes, ponds, glaciers > 1 km^{2} (0.386 sq mi or 247 acres) and river estuaries.

Baudrémont (French pronunciation: [bodʁemɔ̃]) is a commune in the Meuse department in the Grand Est region in northeastern France.

== Population ==
Historical population
Year	Pop.	±% p.a.
1968	54	—
1975	56	+0.52%
1982	50	−1.61%
1990	48	−0.51%
1999	50	+0.45%
2007	49	−0.25%
2012	54	+1.96%
2017	50	−1.53%
2023	44	−2.11%
Source: INSEE

== See also ==
- Communes of the Meuse department
