= Ippécourt =

- Commune
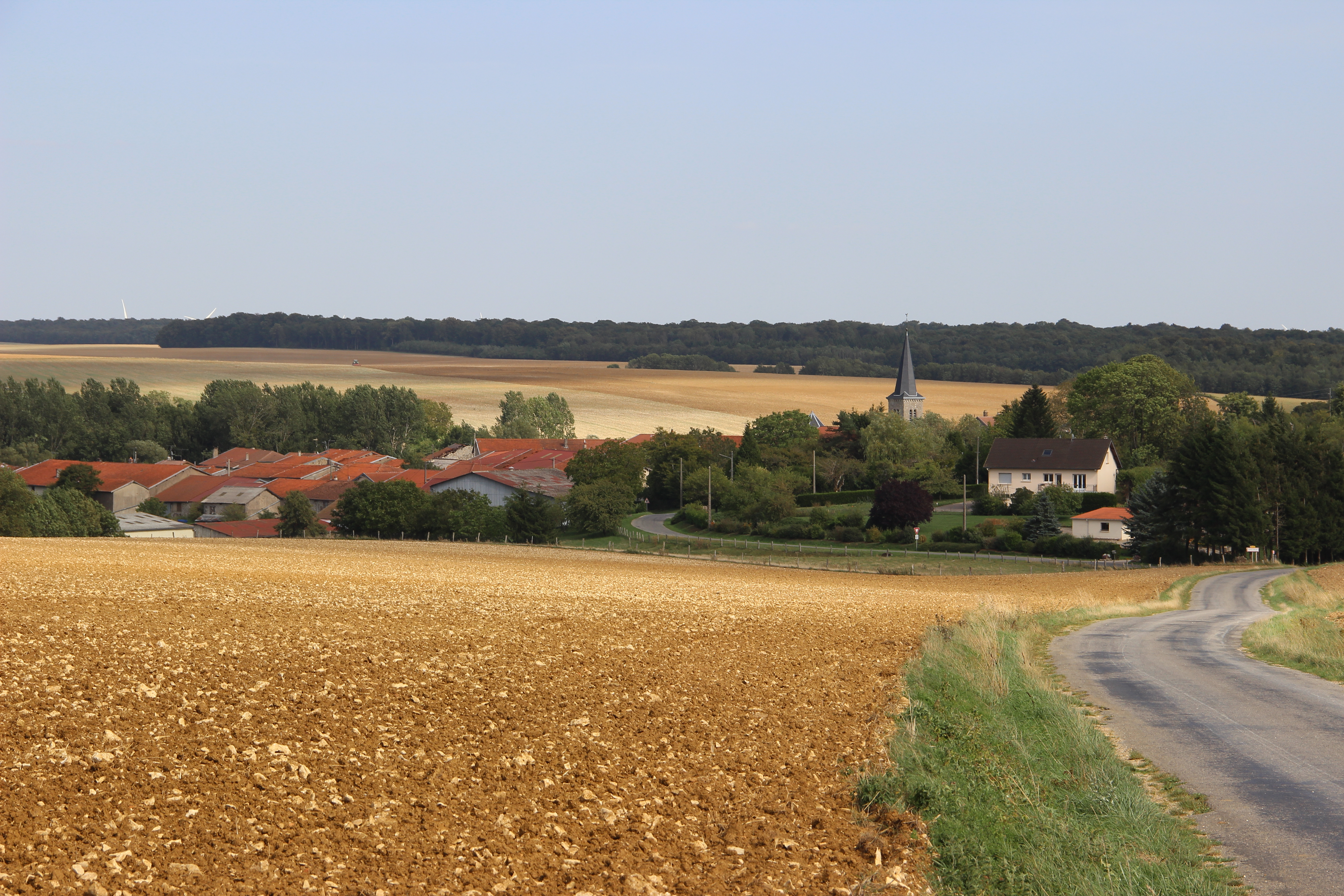
- A general view of Ippécourt

- Coat of arms
- Location of Ippécourt
- Location within France Location within Grand Est
- Coordinates: 49°02′12″N 5°12′42″E
- Country: France
- Region: Grand Est
- Department: Meuse
- Arrondissement: Bar-le-Duc
- Canton: Dieue-sur-Meuse
- Intercommunality: CC de l'Aire à l'Argonne

Government
  - Mayor (2020–2026): Marc Nicolas
- Area^{1}: 10.62 km^{2} (4.10 sq mi)
- Elevation: 256 m (840 ft)
- Highest elevation: 306 m (1,004 ft)
- Lowest elevation: 244 m (801 ft)
- Population (2023): 88
  - Density: 8.3/km^{2} (21/sq mi)
- Time zone: UTC+01:00 (CET)
  - Summer (DST): UTC+02:00 (CEST)
- INSEE/Postal code: 55251 /55220
- ^{1} French Land Register data, which excludes lakes, ponds, glaciers > 1 km^{2} (0.386 sq mi or 247 acres) and river estuaries.

Ippécourt (French pronunciation: [ipekuʁ]) is a commune in the Meuse department in Grand Est in north-eastern France.

== See also ==
- Communes of the Meuse department
