= Villotte-sur-Aire =

- Commune
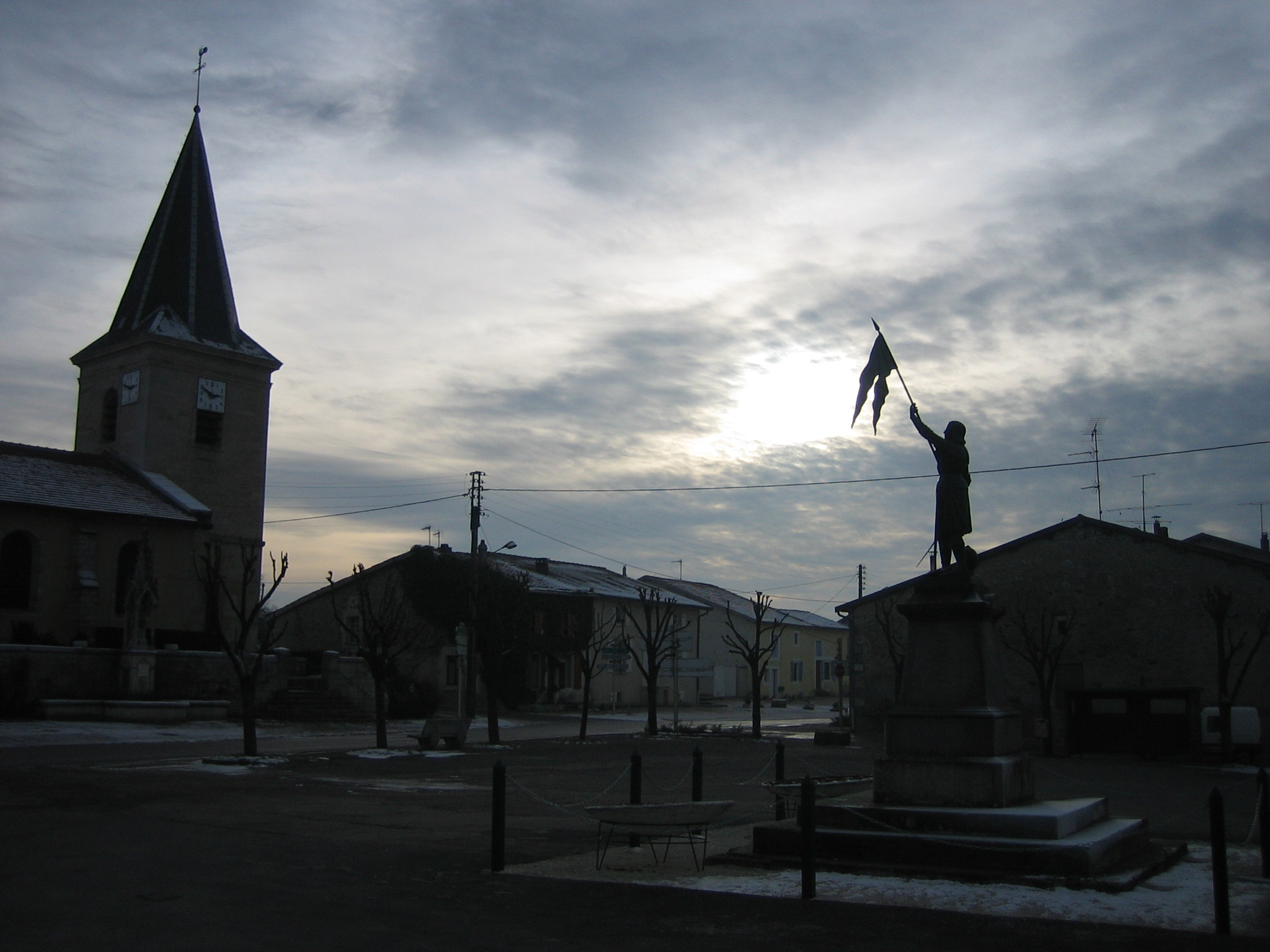
- The church and war memorial in Villotte-sur-Aire

- Coat of arms
- Location of Villotte-sur-Aire
- Location within France Location within Grand Est
- Coordinates: 48°51′35″N 5°20′32″E
- Country: France
- Region: Grand Est
- Department: Meuse
- Arrondissement: Commercy
- Canton: Dieue-sur-Meuse
- Intercommunality: CC de l'Aire à l'Argonne

Government
  - Mayor (2022–2026): Christine Polmard
- Area^{1}: 13.96 km^{2} (5.39 sq mi)
- Elevation: 330 m (1,080 ft)
- Highest elevation: 362 m (1,188 ft)
- Lowest elevation: 257 m (843 ft)
- Population (2023): 207
  - Density: 14.8/km^{2} (38.4/sq mi)
- Time zone: UTC+01:00 (CET)
  - Summer (DST): UTC+02:00 (CEST)
- INSEE/Postal code: 55570 /55260
- ^{1} French Land Register data, which excludes lakes, ponds, glaciers > 1 km^{2} (0.386 sq mi or 247 acres) and river estuaries.

Villotte-sur-Aire (French pronunciation: [vilɔt syʁ ɛːʁ]; literally "Villotte on Aire") is a commune in the Meuse department in Grand Est in north-eastern France.

== See also ==
- Communes of the Meuse department
