= Lavoye =

- Commune
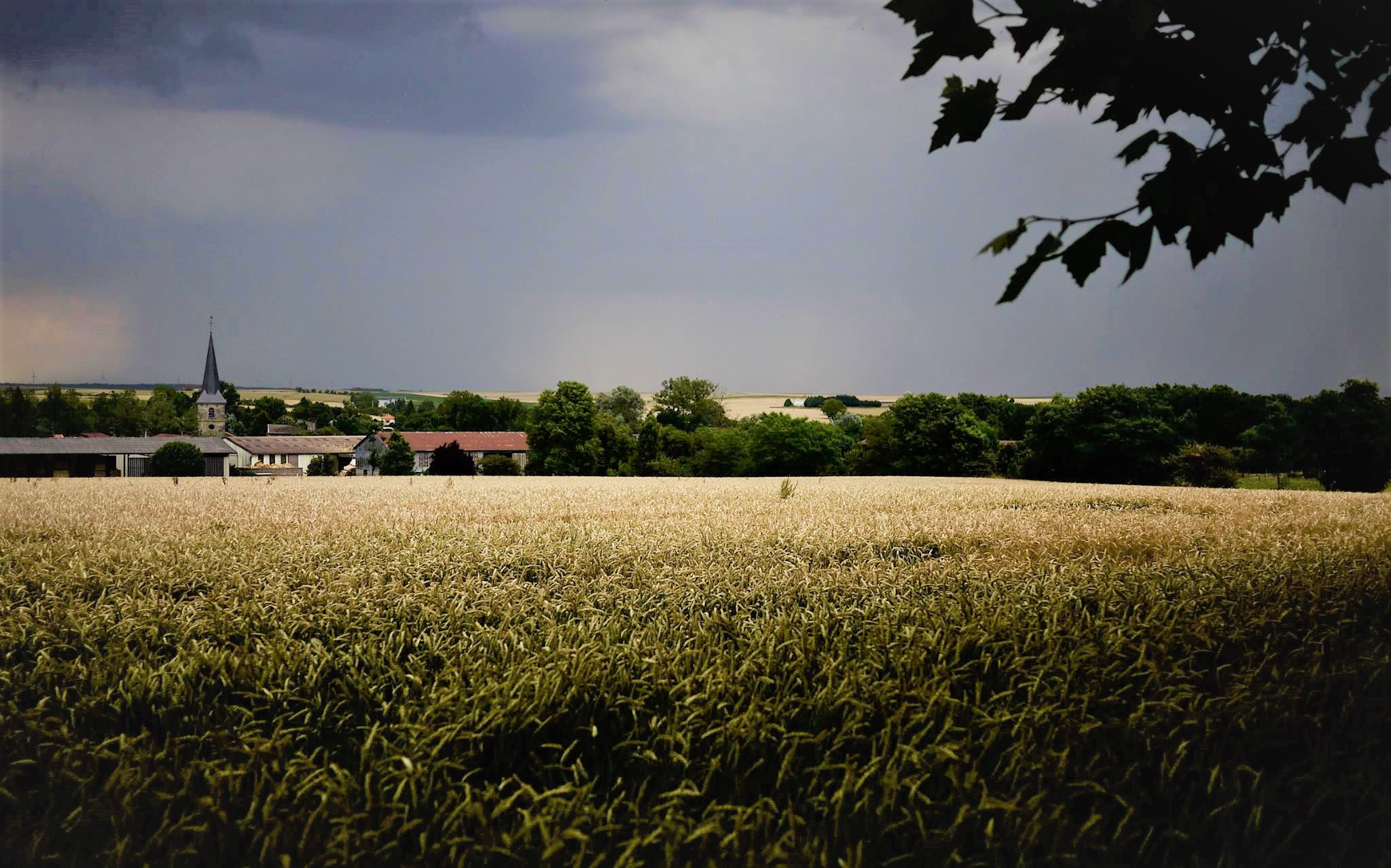
- A general view of Lavoye

- Coat of arms
- Location of Lavoye
- Location within France Location within Grand Est
- Coordinates: 49°02′46″N 5°08′18″E
- Country: France
- Region: Grand Est
- Department: Meuse
- Arrondissement: Bar-le-Duc
- Canton: Dieue-sur-Meuse
- Intercommunality: CC de l'Aire à l'Argonne

Government
  - Mayor (2020–2026): Christian Weiss
- Area^{1}: 10.02 km^{2} (3.87 sq mi)
- Elevation: 200 m (660 ft)
- Highest elevation: 275 m (902 ft)
- Lowest elevation: 197 m (646 ft)
- Population (2023): 142
  - Density: 14.2/km^{2} (36.7/sq mi)
- Time zone: UTC+01:00 (CET)
  - Summer (DST): UTC+02:00 (CEST)
- INSEE/Postal code: 55285 /55120
- ^{1} French Land Register data, which excludes lakes, ponds, glaciers > 1 km^{2} (0.386 sq mi or 247 acres) and river estuaries.

Lavoye (French pronunciation: [lavwa]) is a commune in the Meuse department in Grand Est in north-eastern France.

== See also ==
- Communes of the Meuse department
