= Kœur-la-Grande =

Koeur-la-Grande
- Commune
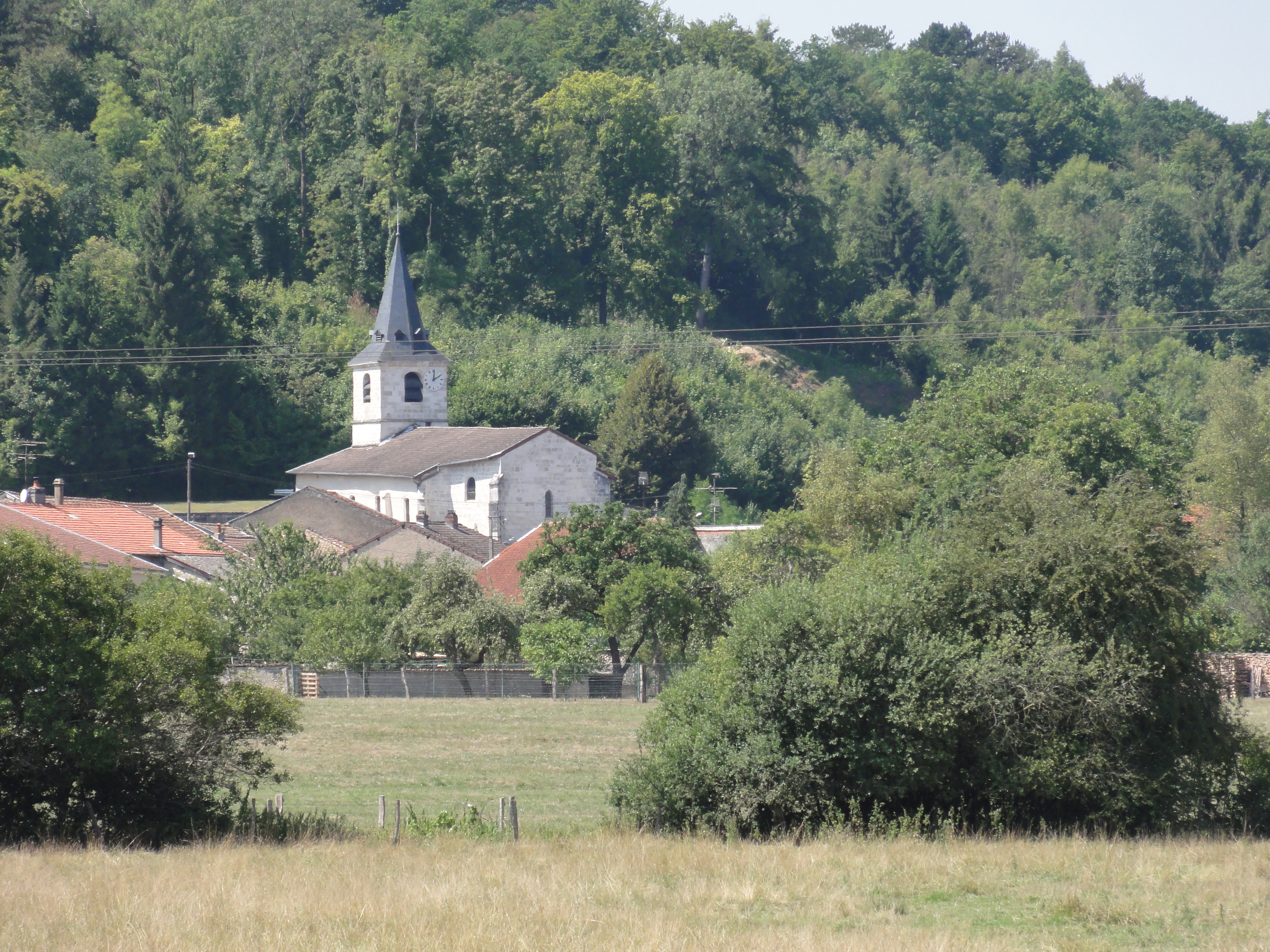
- The church in Kœur-la-Grande

- Coat of arms
- Location of Koeur-la-Grande
- Location within France Location within Grand Est
- Coordinates: 48°51′32″N 5°29′00″E
- Country: France
- Region: Grand Est
- Department: Meuse
- Arrondissement: Commercy
- Canton: Dieue-sur-Meuse
- Intercommunality: Sammiellois

Government
  - Mayor (2020–2026): Jean-Claude Demange
- Area^{1}: 12.32 km^{2} (4.76 sq mi)
- Elevation: 222 m (728 ft)
- Highest elevation: 355 m (1,165 ft)
- Lowest elevation: 217 m (712 ft)
- Population (2023): 164
  - Density: 13.3/km^{2} (34.5/sq mi)
- Time zone: UTC+01:00 (CET)
  - Summer (DST): UTC+02:00 (CEST)
- INSEE/Postal code: 55263 /55300
- ^{1} French Land Register data, which excludes lakes, ponds, glaciers > 1 km^{2} (0.386 sq mi or 247 acres) and river estuaries.

Kœur-la-Grande (French pronunciation: [kœʁ la ɡʁɑ̃d]) is a commune in the Meuse department in Grand Est in north-eastern France.

== See also ==
- Communes of the Meuse department
