= Génicourt-sur-Meuse =

- Commune
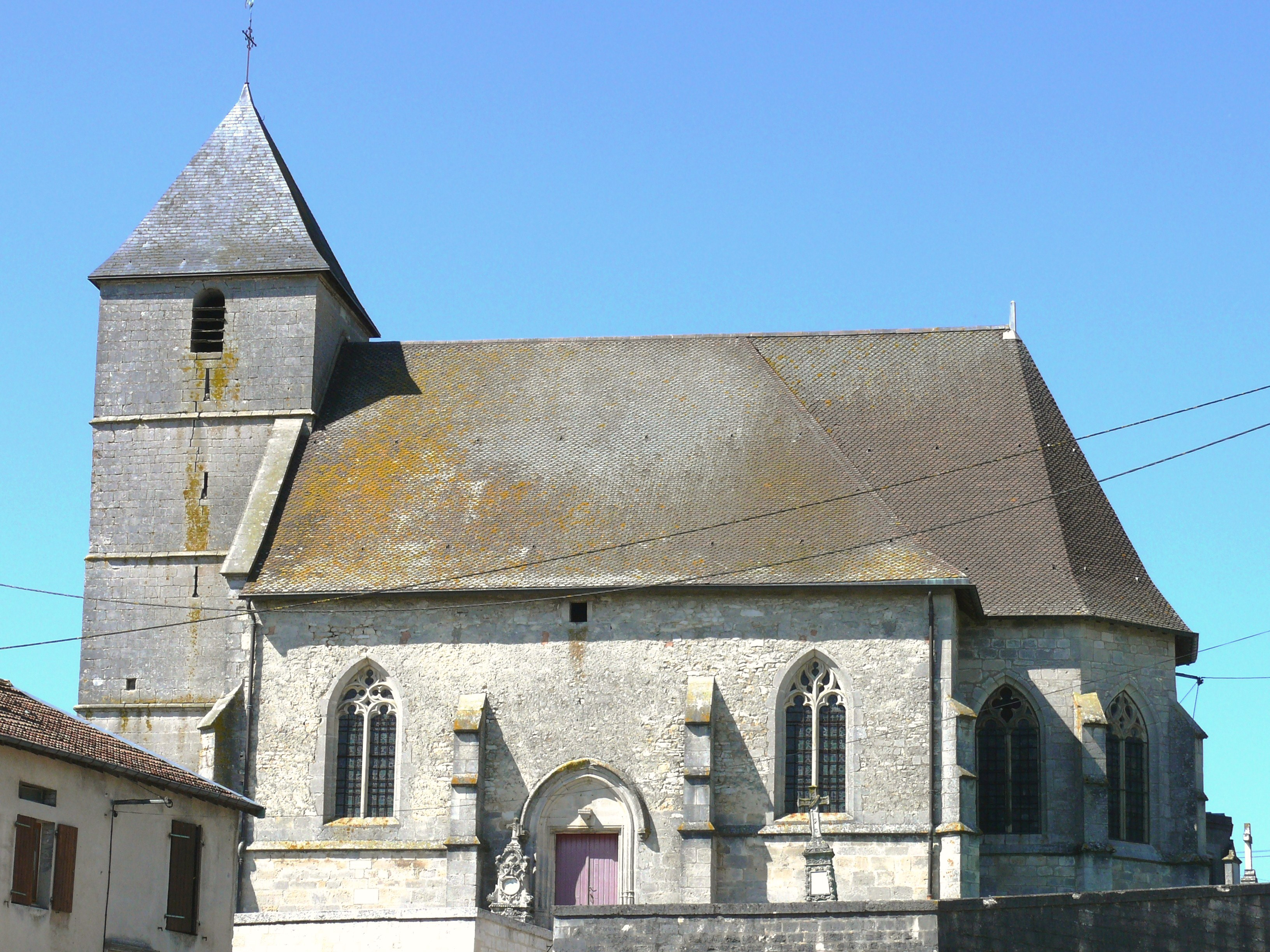
- The church in Génicourt-sur-Meuse

- Coat of arms
- Location of Génicourt-sur-Meuse
- Location within France Location within Grand Est
- Coordinates: 49°02′12″N 5°26′17″E
- Country: France
- Region: Grand Est
- Department: Meuse
- Arrondissement: Verdun
- Canton: Dieue-sur-Meuse

Government
  - Mayor (2020–2026): Jean-François Pérotin
- Area^{1}: 7.99 km^{2} (3.08 sq mi)
- Elevation: 178 m (584 ft)
- Highest elevation: 360 m (1,180 ft)
- Lowest elevation: 203 m (666 ft)
- Population (2023): 293
  - Density: 36.7/km^{2} (95.0/sq mi)
- Time zone: UTC+01:00 (CET)
  - Summer (DST): UTC+02:00 (CEST)
- INSEE/Postal code: 55204 /55320
- ^{1} French Land Register data, which excludes lakes, ponds, glaciers > 1 km^{2} (0.386 sq mi or 247 acres) and river estuaries.

Génicourt-sur-Meuse (French pronunciation: [ʒenikuʁ syʁ møz], literally Génicourt on Meuse) is a commune in the Meuse department in Grand Est in north-eastern France.

== See also ==
- Communes of the Meuse department
- Parc naturel régional de Lorraine
