= Lignières-sur-Aire =

- Commune
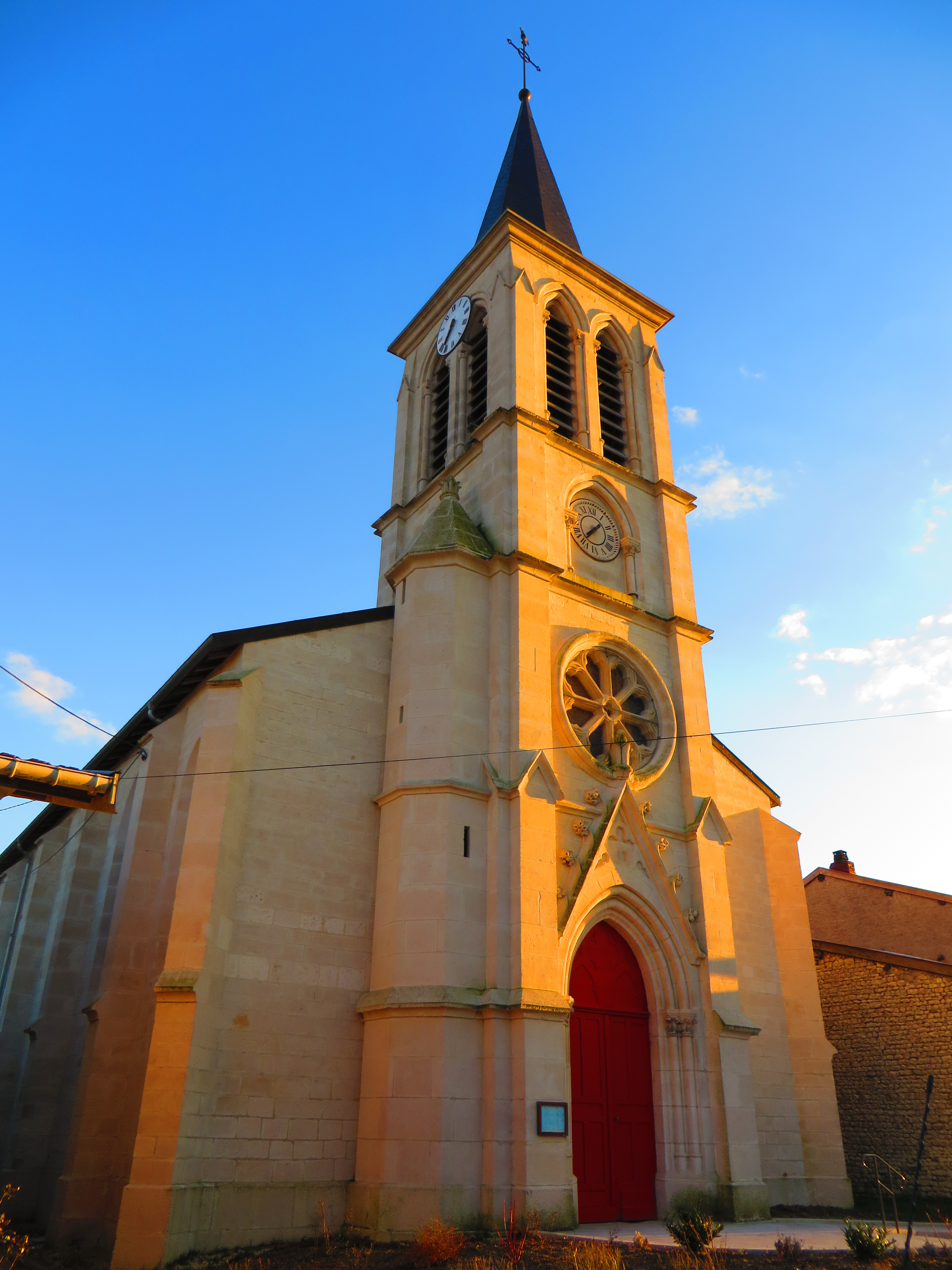
- The church in Lignières-sur-Aire

- Coat of arms
- Location of Lignières-sur-Aire
- Location within France Location within Grand Est
- Coordinates: 48°48′35″N 5°22′59″E
- Country: France
- Region: Grand Est
- Department: Meuse
- Arrondissement: Commercy
- Canton: Dieue-sur-Meuse
- Intercommunality: De l'Aire à l'Argonne

Government
  - Mayor (2020–2026): Frédéric Ernst
- Area^{1}: 9.3 km^{2} (3.6 sq mi)
- Elevation: 291 m (955 ft)
- Highest elevation: 357 m (1,171 ft)
- Lowest elevation: 277 m (909 ft)
- Population (2023): 49
  - Density: 5.3/km^{2} (14/sq mi)
- Demonym(s): Lignièrois, Lignièroises
- Time zone: UTC+01:00 (CET)
  - Summer (DST): UTC+02:00 (CEST)
- INSEE/Postal code: 55290 /55260
- ^{1} French Land Register data, which excludes lakes, ponds, glaciers > 1 km^{2} (0.386 sq mi or 247 acres) and river estuaries.

Lignières-sur-Aire (French pronunciation: [liɲjɛʁ syʁ ɛːʁ]; literally "Lignières on Aire") is a commune in the Meuse department in Grand Est in north-eastern France.

== Population ==
Historical population
Year	Pop.	±% p.a.
1968	66	—
1975	57	−2.07%
1982	55	−0.51%
1990	69	+2.88%
1999	60	−1.54%
2007	50	−2.25%
2012	51	+0.40%
2017	53	+0.77%
2023	49	−1.30%
Source: INSEE

== See also ==
- Communes of the Meuse department
