= Ambly-sur-Meuse =

- Commune
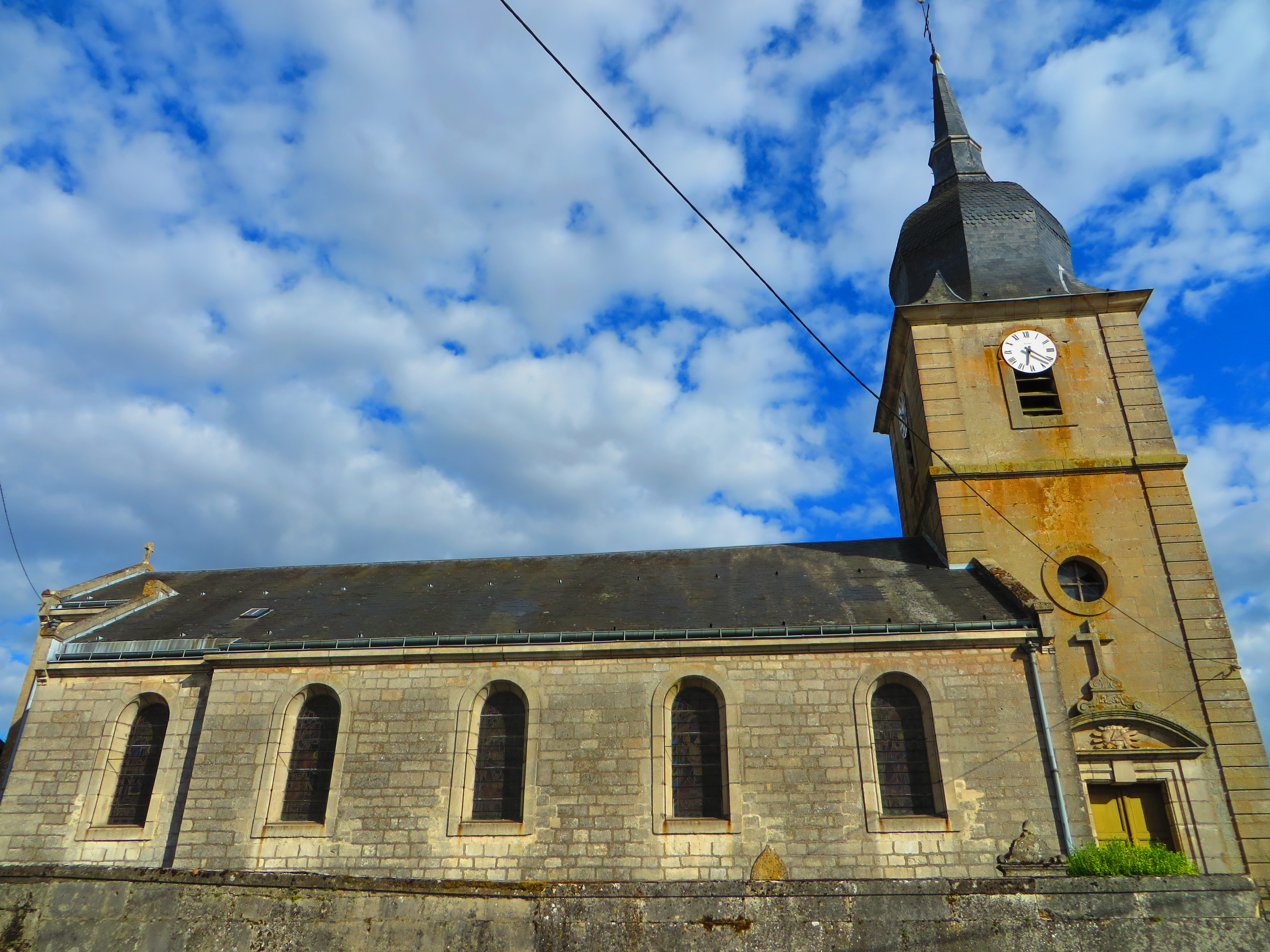
- The church in Ambly-sur-Meuse
- Location of Ambly-sur-Meuse
- Location within France Location within Grand Est
- Coordinates: 49°01′12″N 5°26′36″E
- Country: France
- Region: Grand Est
- Department: Meuse
- Arrondissement: Verdun
- Canton: Dieue-sur-Meuse
- Intercommunality: Val de Meuse - Voie Sacrée

Government
  - Mayor (2020–2026): Luigi Fornito
- Area^{1}: 6.34 km^{2} (2.45 sq mi)
- Elevation: 212 m (696 ft)
- Highest elevation: 273 m (896 ft)
- Lowest elevation: 204 m (669 ft)
- Population (2023): 245
  - Density: 38.6/km^{2} (100/sq mi)
- Time zone: UTC+01:00 (CET)
  - Summer (DST): UTC+02:00 (CEST)
- INSEE/Postal code: 55007 /55300
- ^{1} French Land Register data, which excludes lakes, ponds, glaciers > 1 km^{2} (0.386 sq mi or 247 acres) and river estuaries.

Ambly-sur-Meuse (French pronunciation: [ɑ̃bli syʁ møz], literally Ambly on Meuse) is a commune in the Meuse department in the Grand Est region in northeastern France.

== Population ==
Historical population
Year	Pop.	±% p.a.
1968	263	—
1975	226	−2.14%
1982	199	−1.80%
1990	227	+1.66%
1999	254	+1.26%
2007	262	+0.39%
2012	243	−1.49%
2017	245	+0.16%
2023	245	+0.00%
Source: INSEE

== See also ==
- Communes of the Meuse department
