= Fresnes-au-Mont =

- Commune
- Coat of arms
- Location of Fresnes-au-Mont
- Location within France Location within Grand Est
- Coordinates: 48°53′52″N 5°26′32″E
- Country: France
- Region: Grand Est
- Department: Meuse
- Arrondissement: Commercy
- Canton: Dieue-sur-Meuse
- Intercommunality: CC de l'Aire à l'Argonne

Government
  - Mayor (2020–2026): Jean-Marc Ilic
- Area^{1}: 15.89 km^{2} (6.14 sq mi)
- Elevation: 287 m (942 ft)
- Highest elevation: 355 m (1,165 ft)
- Lowest elevation: 230 m (750 ft)
- Population (2023): 162
  - Density: 10.2/km^{2} (26.4/sq mi)
- Time zone: UTC+01:00 (CET)
  - Summer (DST): UTC+02:00 (CEST)
- INSEE/Postal code: 55197 /55260
- ^{1} French Land Register data, which excludes lakes, ponds, glaciers > 1 km^{2} (0.386 sq mi or 247 acres) and river estuaries.

Fresnes-au-Mont (French pronunciation: [fʁɛn o mɔ̃]) is a commune in the Meuse department in Grand Est in north-eastern France.

== See also ==
- Communes of the Meuse department
