= Lavallée =

- Commune
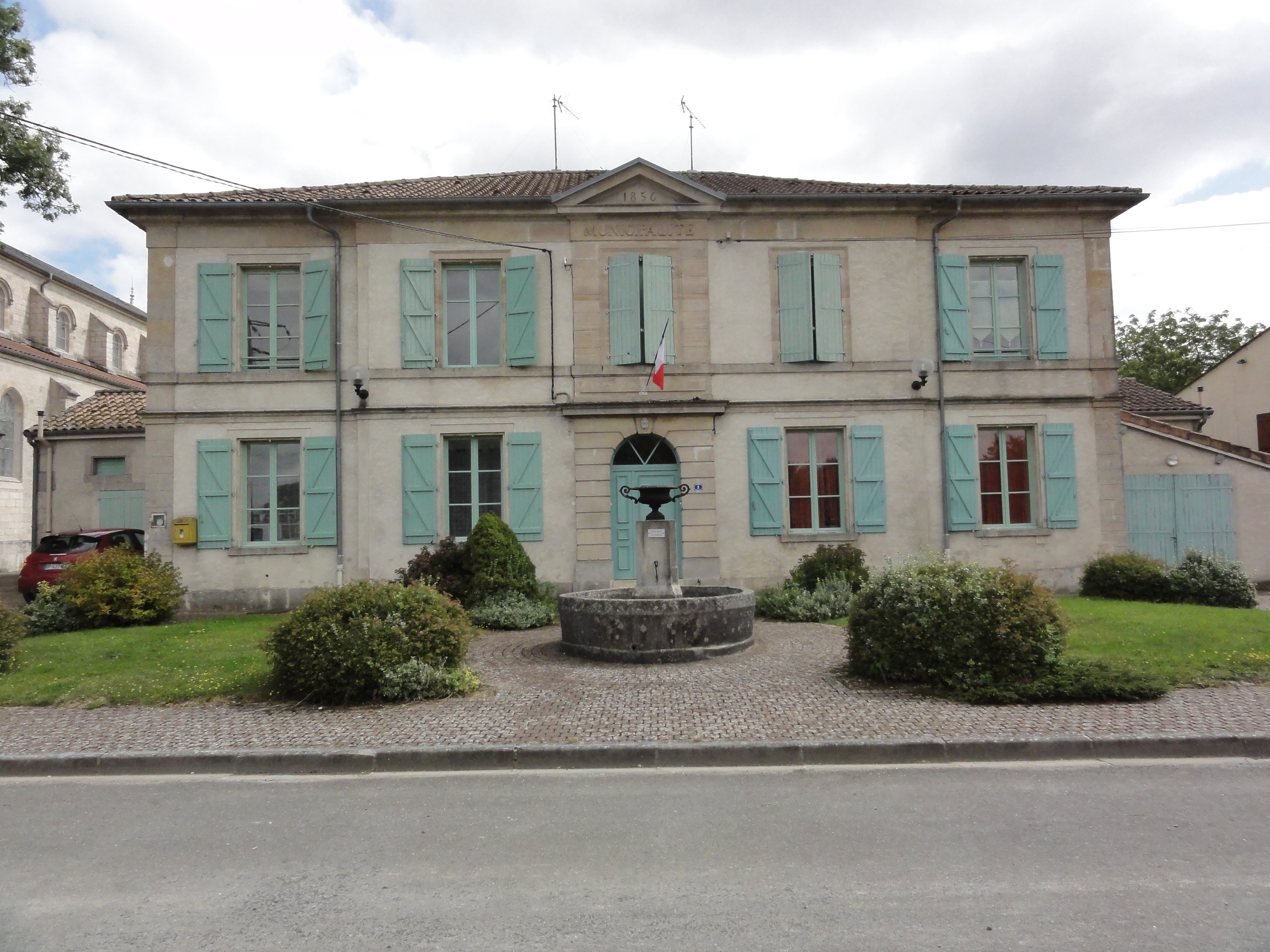
- The town hall in Lavallée
- Location of Lavallée
- Location within France Location within Grand Est
- Coordinates: 48°48′54″N 5°20′41″E
- Country: France
- Region: Grand Est
- Department: Meuse
- Arrondissement: Commercy
- Canton: Dieue-sur-Meuse
- Intercommunality: CC de l'Aire à l'Argonne

Government
  - Mayor (2020–2026): Michel Moreau
- Area^{1}: 12.58 km^{2} (4.86 sq mi)
- Elevation: 304 m (997 ft)
- Highest elevation: 383 m (1,257 ft)
- Lowest elevation: 291 m (955 ft)
- Population (2023): 83
  - Density: 6.6/km^{2} (17/sq mi)
- Time zone: UTC+01:00 (CET)
  - Summer (DST): UTC+02:00 (CEST)
- INSEE/Postal code: 55282 /55260
- ^{1} French Land Register data, which excludes lakes, ponds, glaciers > 1 km^{2} (0.386 sq mi or 247 acres) and river estuaries.

Lavallée (French pronunciation: [lavale]) is a commune in the Meuse department in Grand Est in north-eastern France.

== See also ==
- Communes of the Meuse department
