= Ménil-aux-Bois =

- Commune
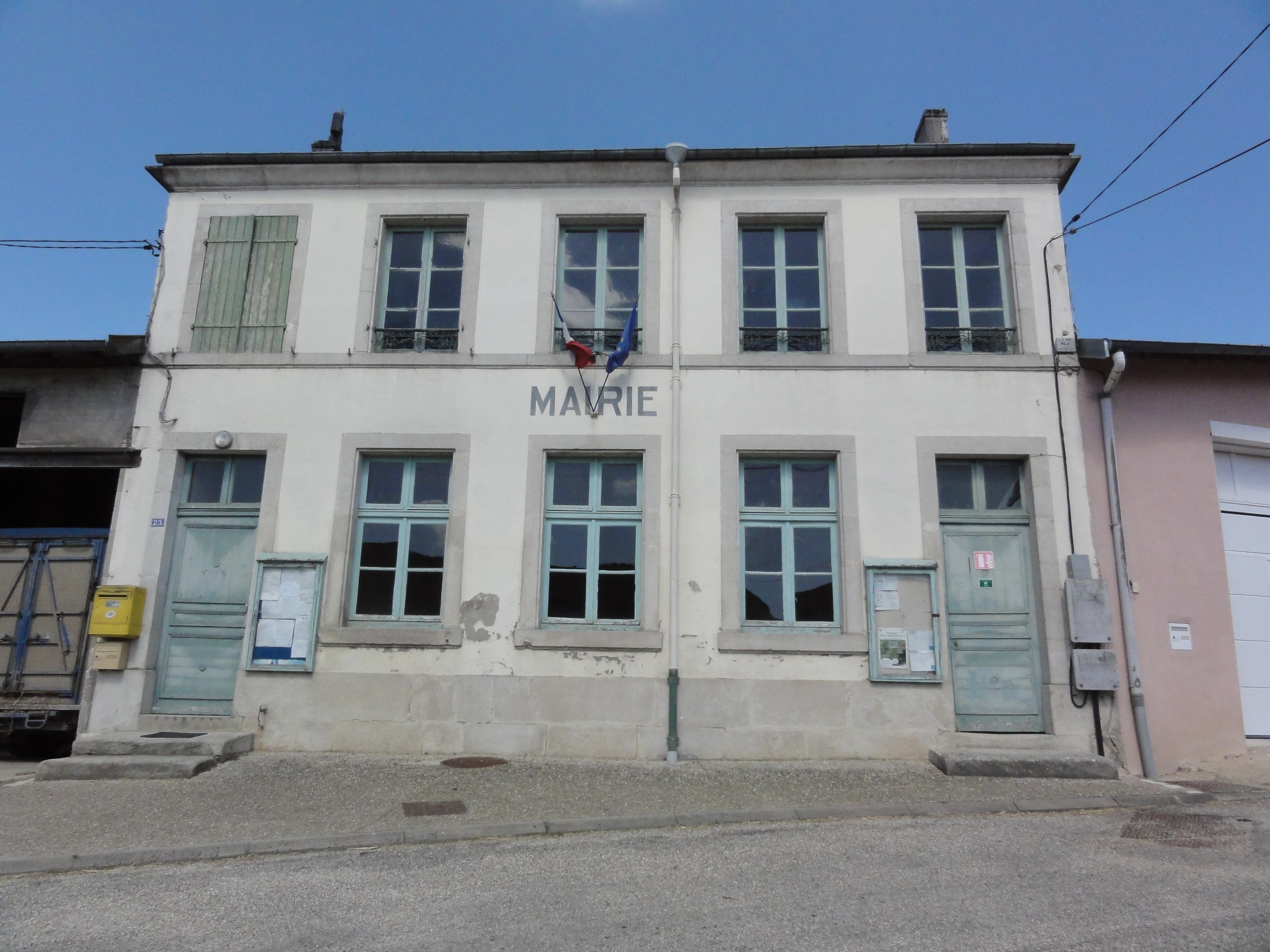
- The town hall in Ménil-aux-Bois

- Coat of arms
- Location of Ménil-aux-Bois
- Location within France Location within Grand Est
- Coordinates: 48°48′21″N 5°26′41″E
- Country: France
- Region: Grand Est
- Department: Meuse
- Arrondissement: Commercy
- Canton: Dieue-sur-Meuse

Government
  - Mayor (2020–2026): Bernard Peltier
- Area^{1}: 6.71 km^{2} (2.59 sq mi)
- Elevation: 290 m (950 ft)
- Highest elevation: 357 m (1,171 ft)
- Lowest elevation: 256 m (840 ft)
- Population (2023): 48
  - Density: 7.2/km^{2} (19/sq mi)
- Time zone: UTC+01:00 (CET)
  - Summer (DST): UTC+02:00 (CEST)
- INSEE/Postal code: 55333 /55260
- ^{1} French Land Register data, which excludes lakes, ponds, glaciers > 1 km^{2} (0.386 sq mi or 247 acres) and river estuaries.

Ménil-aux-Bois (French pronunciation: [menil o bwa]) is a commune in the Meuse department in Grand Est in north-eastern France.

== See also ==
- Communes of the Meuse department
