= Heippes =

- Commune
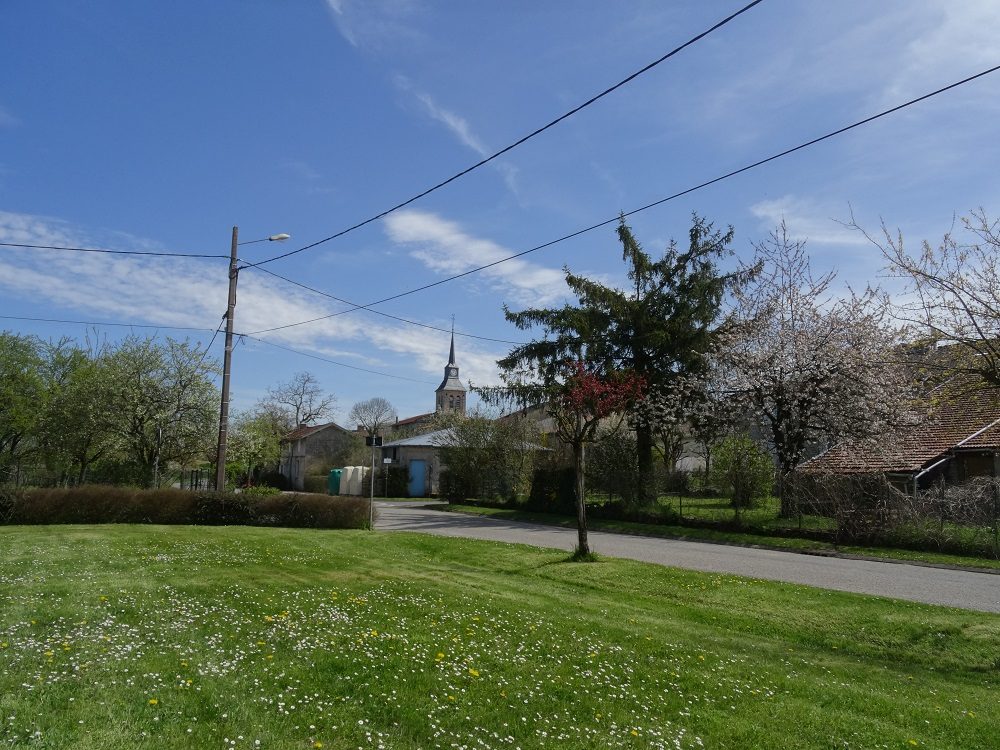
- A general view of Heippes

- Coat of arms
- Location of Heippes
- Location within France Location within Grand Est
- Coordinates: 48°59′40″N 5°17′38″E
- Country: France
- Region: Grand Est
- Department: Meuse
- Arrondissement: Verdun
- Canton: Dieue-sur-Meuse
- Intercommunality: Val de Meuse - Voie Sacrée

Government
  - Mayor (2020–2026): Pascal Pierre
- Area^{1}: 10.48 km^{2} (4.05 sq mi)
- Elevation: 298 m (978 ft)
- Highest elevation: 347 m (1,138 ft)
- Lowest elevation: 265 m (869 ft)
- Population (2023): 86
  - Density: 8.2/km^{2} (21/sq mi)
- Time zone: UTC+01:00 (CET)
  - Summer (DST): UTC+02:00 (CEST)
- INSEE/Postal code: 55241 /55220
- ^{1} French Land Register data, which excludes lakes, ponds, glaciers > 1 km^{2} (0.386 sq mi or 247 acres) and river estuaries.

Heippes (French pronunciation: [ɛp]) is a commune in the Meuse department in Grand Est in north-eastern France.

== See also ==
- Communes of the Meuse department
