= Villers-sur-Meuse =

- Commune
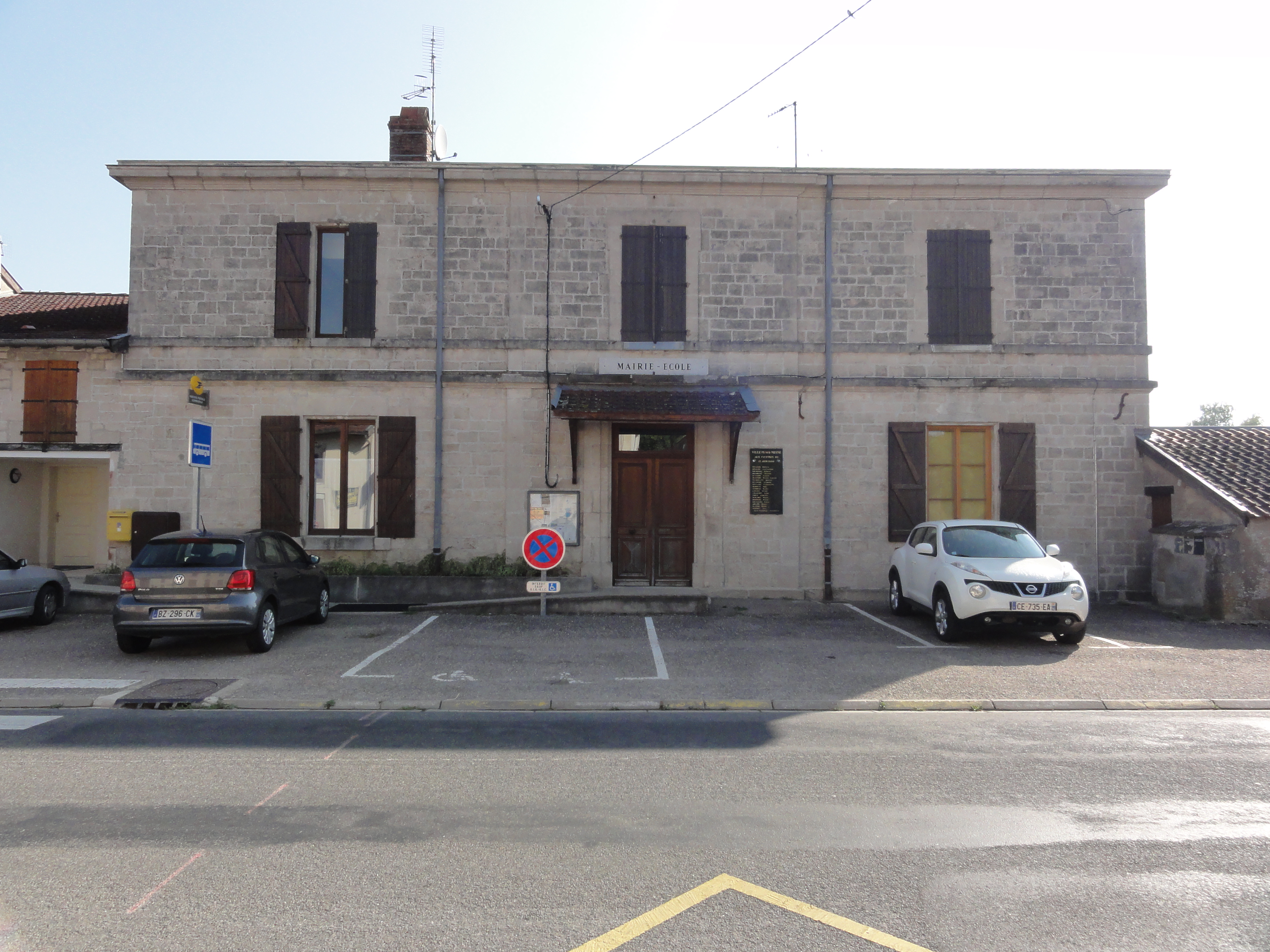
- The town hall in Villers-sur-Meuse
- Location of Villers-sur-Meuse
- Location within France Location within Grand Est
- Coordinates: 49°01′12″N 5°25′08″E
- Country: France
- Region: Grand Est
- Department: Meuse
- Arrondissement: Verdun
- Canton: Dieue-sur-Meuse
- Intercommunality: Val de Meuse - Voie Sacrée

Government
  - Mayor (2020–2026): Maryline Guerra
- Area^{1}: 7.3 km^{2} (2.8 sq mi)
- Elevation: 210 m (690 ft)
- Highest elevation: 321 m (1,053 ft)
- Lowest elevation: 202 m (663 ft)
- Population (2023): 284
  - Density: 39/km^{2} (100/sq mi)
- Time zone: UTC+01:00 (CET)
  - Summer (DST): UTC+02:00 (CEST)
- INSEE/Postal code: 55566 /55220
- ^{1} French Land Register data, which excludes lakes, ponds, glaciers > 1 km^{2} (0.386 sq mi or 247 acres) and river estuaries.

Villers-sur-Meuse (French pronunciation: [vilɛʁ syʁ møz], literally Villers on Meuse) is a commune in the Meuse department in Grand Est in north-eastern France.

== See also ==
- Communes of the Meuse department
