= Levoncourt, Meuse =

Levoncourt
- Commune
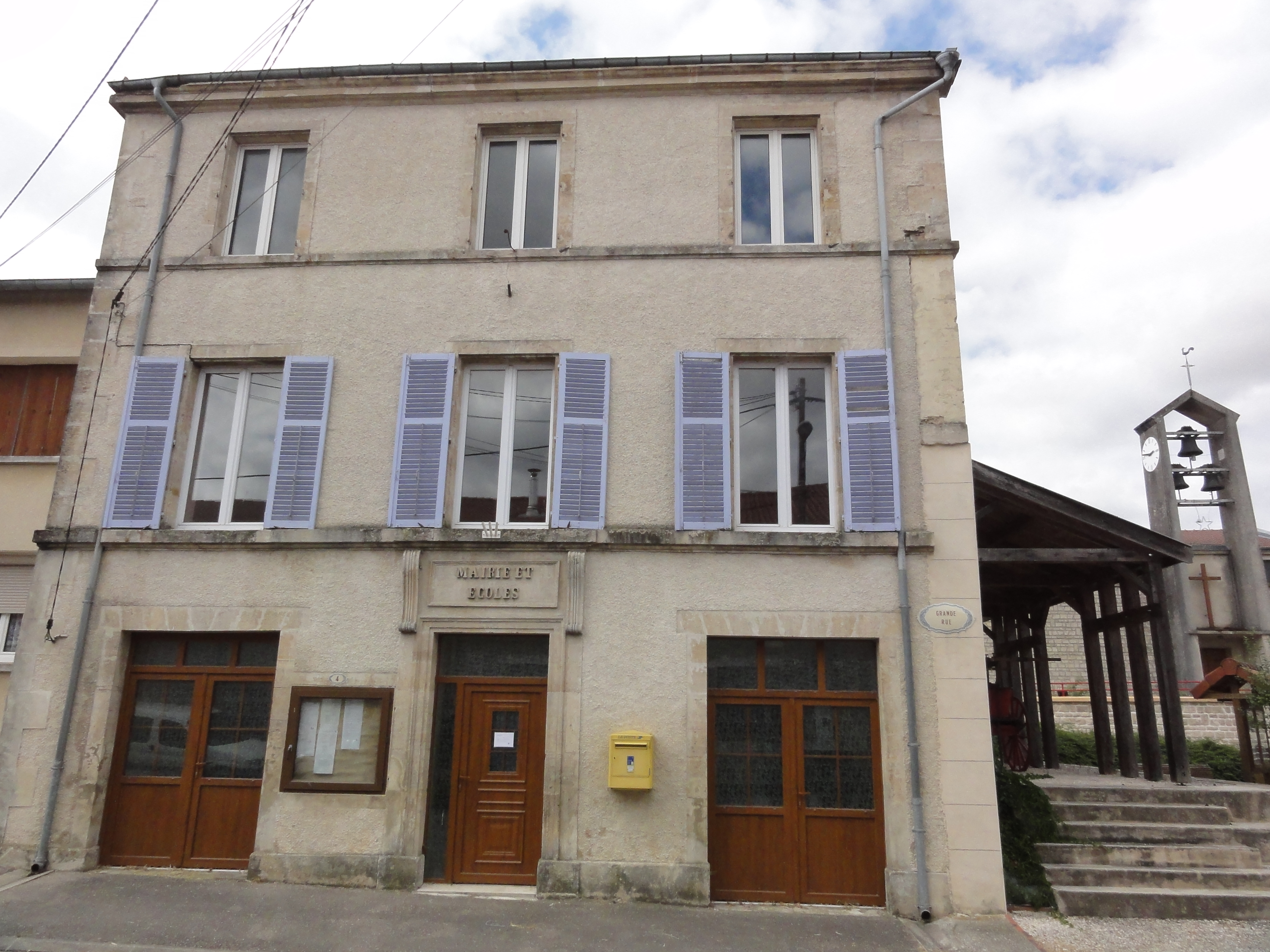
- The town hall in Levoncourt

- Coat of arms
- Location of Levoncourt
- Location within France Location within Grand Est
- Coordinates: 48°49′26″N 5°21′08″E
- Country: France
- Region: Grand Est
- Department: Meuse
- Arrondissement: Commercy
- Canton: Dieue-sur-Meuse
- Intercommunality: CC de l'Aire à l'Argonne

Government
  - Mayor (2020–2026): Marie-Pierre Verdun
- Area^{1}: 7.8 km^{2} (3.0 sq mi)
- Elevation: 292 m (958 ft)
- Highest elevation: 369 m (1,211 ft)
- Lowest elevation: 277 m (909 ft)
- Population (2023): 52
  - Density: 6.7/km^{2} (17/sq mi)
- Time zone: UTC+01:00 (CET)
  - Summer (DST): UTC+02:00 (CEST)
- INSEE/Postal code: 55289 /55260
- ^{1} French Land Register data, which excludes lakes, ponds, glaciers > 1 km^{2} (0.386 sq mi or 247 acres) and river estuaries.

Levoncourt (French pronunciation: [ləvɔ̃kuʁ]) is a commune in the Meuse department in Grand Est in north-eastern France.

== See also ==
- Communes of the Meuse department
