= Rupt-devant-Saint-Mihiel =

- Commune
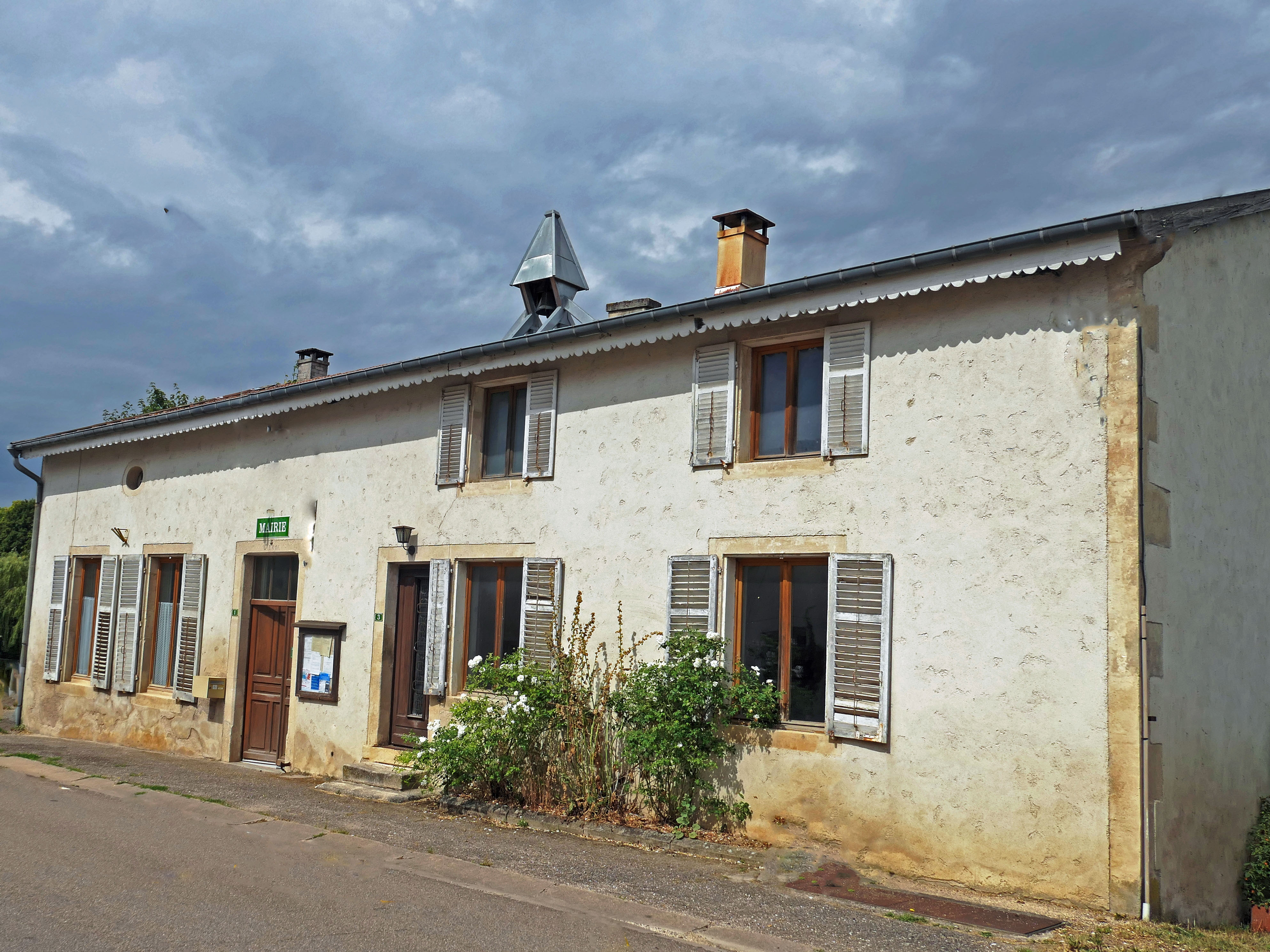
- Rupt-devant-Saint-Mihiel Town hall

- Coat of arms
- Location of Rupt-devant-Saint-Mihiel
- Location within France Location within Grand Est
- Coordinates: 48°53′00″N 5°24′22″E
- Country: France
- Region: Grand Est
- Department: Meuse
- Arrondissement: Commercy
- Canton: Dieue-sur-Meuse
- Intercommunality: CC de l'Aire à l'Argonne

Government
  - Mayor (2020–2026): Joseph Kaag
- Area^{1}: 6.32 km^{2} (2.44 sq mi)
- Elevation: 330 m (1,080 ft)
- Highest elevation: 347 m (1,138 ft)
- Lowest elevation: 257 m (843 ft)
- Population (2023): 39
  - Density: 6.2/km^{2} (16/sq mi)
- Time zone: UTC+01:00 (CET)
  - Summer (DST): UTC+02:00 (CEST)
- INSEE/Postal code: 55448 /55260
- ^{1} French Land Register data, which excludes lakes, ponds, glaciers > 1 km^{2} (0.386 sq mi or 247 acres) and river estuaries.

Rupt-devant-Saint-Mihiel (French pronunciation: [ʁy dəvɑ̃ sɛ̃ mijɛl], literally Rupt before Saint-Mihiel) is a commune in the Meuse department in Grand Est in north-eastern France.

== See also ==
- Communes of the Meuse department
