= Canton of Dieue-sur-Meuse =

Coordinates: 49.07°N 5.43°E

The canton of Dieue-sur-Meuse is an administrative division of the Meuse department, northeastern France. It was created at the French canton reorganisation which came into effect in March 2015. Its seat is in Dieue-sur-Meuse.

It consists of the following communes:

1. Ambly-sur-Meuse
2. Ancemont
3. Autrécourt-sur-Aire
4. Bannoncourt
5. Baudrémont
6. Beaulieu-en-Argonne
7. Beausite
8. Belrain
9. Bouquemont
10. Brizeaux
11. Courcelles-en-Barrois
12. Courouvre
13. Dieue-sur-Meuse
14. Dompcevrin
15. Èvres
16. Foucaucourt-sur-Thabas
17. Fresnes-au-Mont
18. Génicourt-sur-Meuse
19. Gimécourt
20. Heippes
21. Ippécourt
22. Julvécourt
23. Kœur-la-Grande
24. Kœur-la-Petite
25. Lahaymeix
26. Landrecourt-Lempire
27. Lavallée
28. Lavoye
29. Lemmes
30. Levoncourt
31. Lignières-sur-Aire
32. Longchamps-sur-Aire
33. Ménil-aux-Bois
34. Les Monthairons
35. Neuville-en-Verdunois
36. Nicey-sur-Aire
37. Nixéville-Blercourt
38. Nubécourt
39. Osches
40. Pierrefitte-sur-Aire
41. Pretz-en-Argonne
42. Rambluzin-et-Benoite-Vaux
43. Récourt-le-Creux
44. Rupt-devant-Saint-Mihiel
45. Rupt-en-Woëvre
46. Saint-André-en-Barrois
47. Sampigny
48. Senoncourt-les-Maujouy
49. Seuil-d'Argonne
50. Sommedieue
51. Les Souhesmes-Rampont
52. Souilly
53. Thillombois
54. Tilly-sur-Meuse
55. Les Trois-Domaines
56. Vadelaincourt
57. Ville-devant-Belrain
58. Villers-sur-Meuse
59. Ville-sur-Cousances
60. Villotte-sur-Aire
61. Waly
62. Woimbey
