= Senoncourt-lès-Maujouy =

- Commune
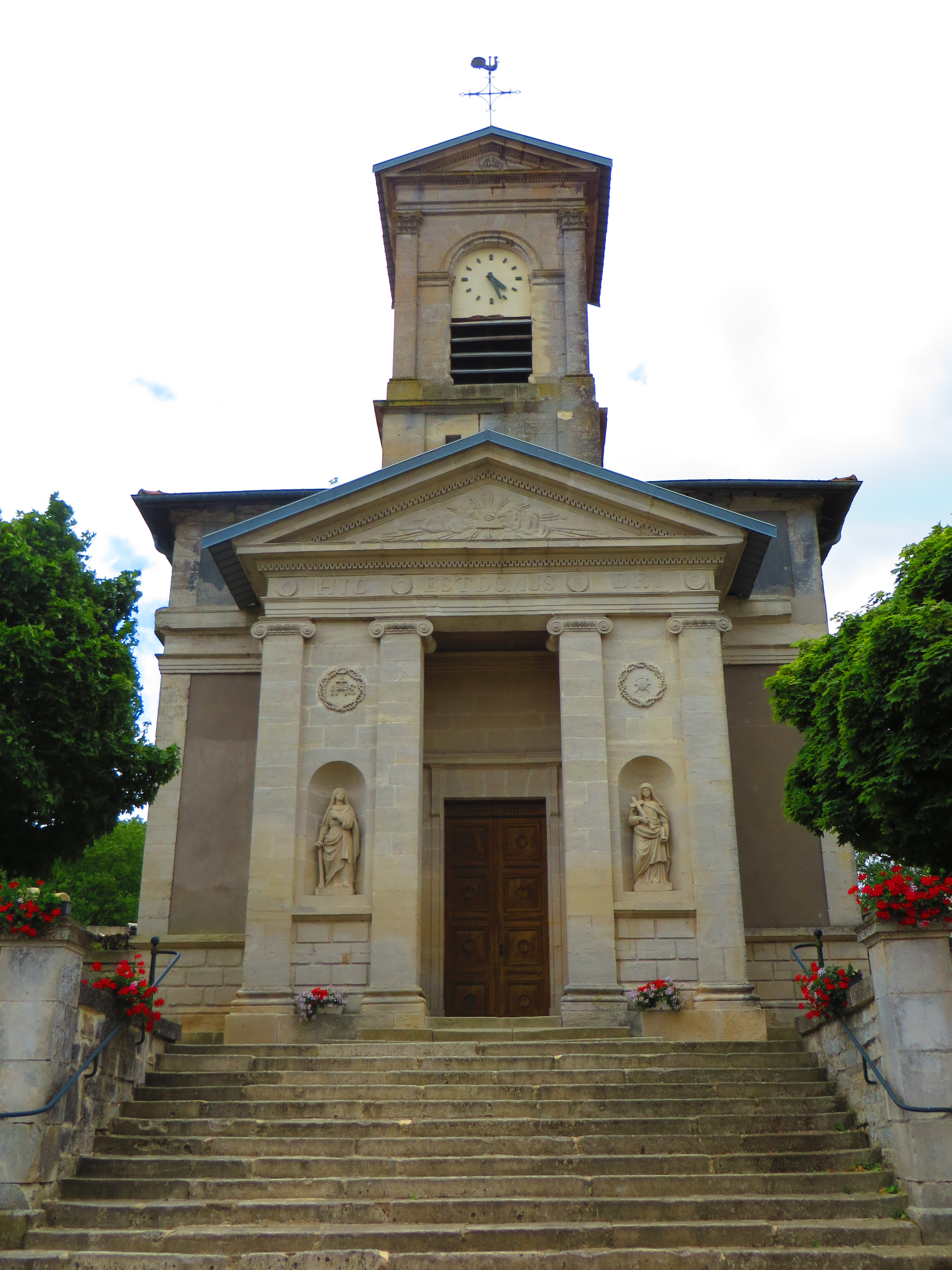
- The church in Senoncourt-lès-Maujouy

- Coat of arms
- Location of Senoncourt-lès-Maujouy
- Location within France Location within Grand Est
- Coordinates: 49°03′32″N 5°20′01″E
- Country: France
- Region: Grand Est
- Department: Meuse
- Arrondissement: Verdun
- Canton: Dieue-sur-Meuse
- Intercommunality: Val de Meuse - Voie Sacrée

Government
  - Mayor (2020–2026): Serge Nahant
- Area^{1}: 14.94 km^{2} (5.77 sq mi)
- Elevation: 290 m (950 ft)
- Highest elevation: 343 m (1,125 ft)
- Lowest elevation: 219 m (719 ft)
- Population (2023): 98
  - Density: 6.6/km^{2} (17/sq mi)
- Time zone: UTC+01:00 (CET)
  - Summer (DST): UTC+02:00 (CEST)
- INSEE/Postal code: 55482 /55220
- ^{1} French Land Register data, which excludes lakes, ponds, glaciers > 1 km^{2} (0.386 sq mi or 247 acres) and river estuaries.

Senoncourt-lès-Maujouy (French pronunciation: [sənɔ̃kuʁ lɛ moʒwi]) is a commune in the Meuse department in Grand Est in north-eastern France.

== See also ==
- Communes of the Meuse department
