= Saint-André-en-Barrois =

- Commune
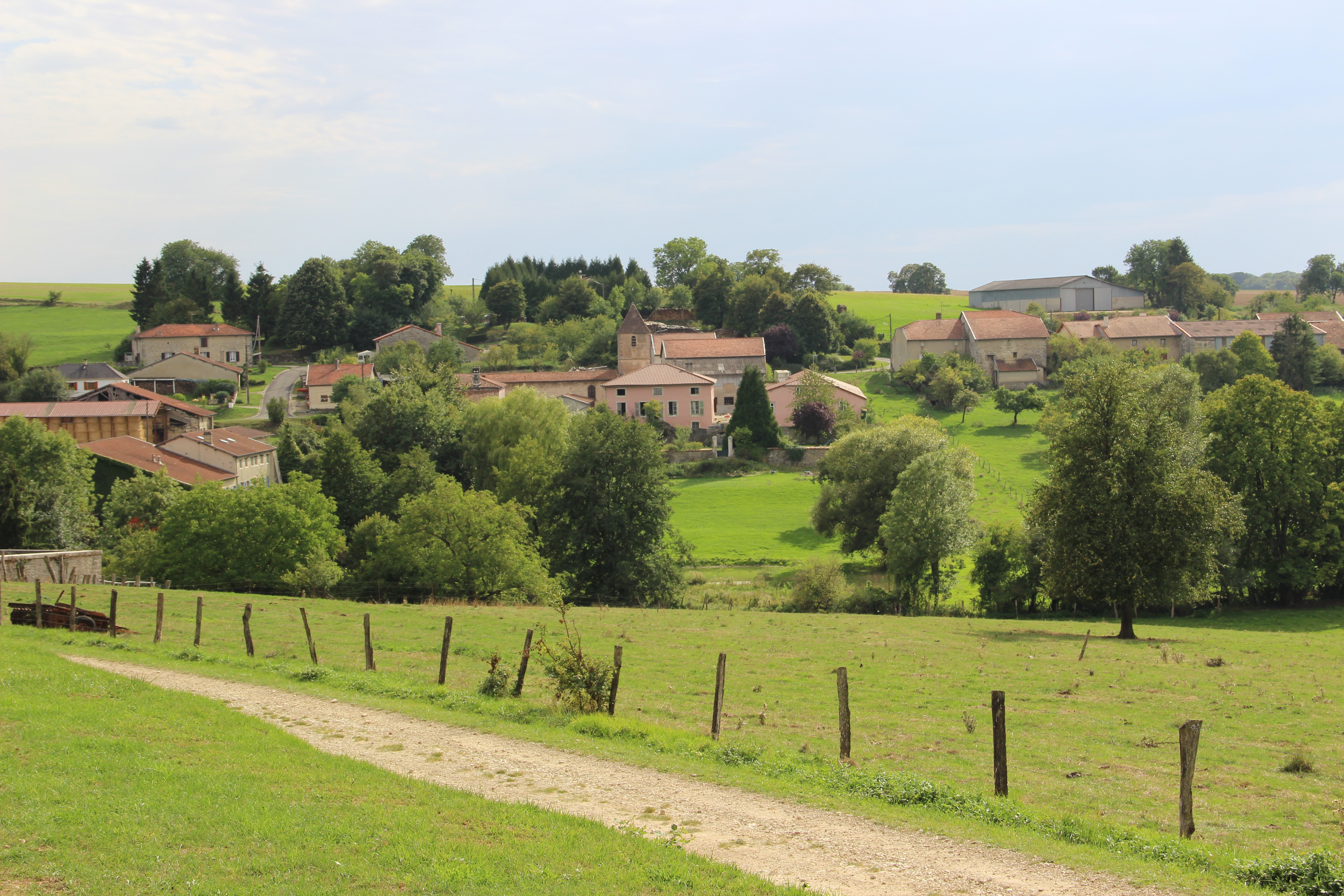
- A general view Saint-André-en-Barrois

- Coat of arms
- Location of Saint-André-en-Barrois
- Location within France Location within Grand Est
- Coordinates: 49°00′51″N 5°13′51″E
- Country: France
- Region: Grand Est
- Department: Meuse
- Arrondissement: Verdun
- Canton: Dieue-sur-Meuse
- Intercommunality: Val de Meuse - Voie Sacrée

Government
  - Mayor (2020–2026): Ronald Lemoine
- Area^{1}: 9.33 km^{2} (3.60 sq mi)
- Elevation: 265 m (869 ft)
- Highest elevation: 326 m (1,070 ft)
- Lowest elevation: 241 m (791 ft)
- Population (2023): 59
  - Density: 6.3/km^{2} (16/sq mi)
- Time zone: UTC+01:00 (CET)
  - Summer (DST): UTC+02:00 (CEST)
- INSEE/Postal code: 55453 /55220
- ^{1} French Land Register data, which excludes lakes, ponds, glaciers > 1 km^{2} (0.386 sq mi or 247 acres) and river estuaries.

Saint-André-en-Barrois (French pronunciation: [sɛ̃t‿ɑ̃dʁe ɑ̃ baʁwa], lit. 'Saint André in Barrois') is a commune situated in the Meuse department within the Grand Est region of north-eastern France.

== See also ==
- Communes of the Meuse department
