= Waly, Meuse =

Waly
- Commune
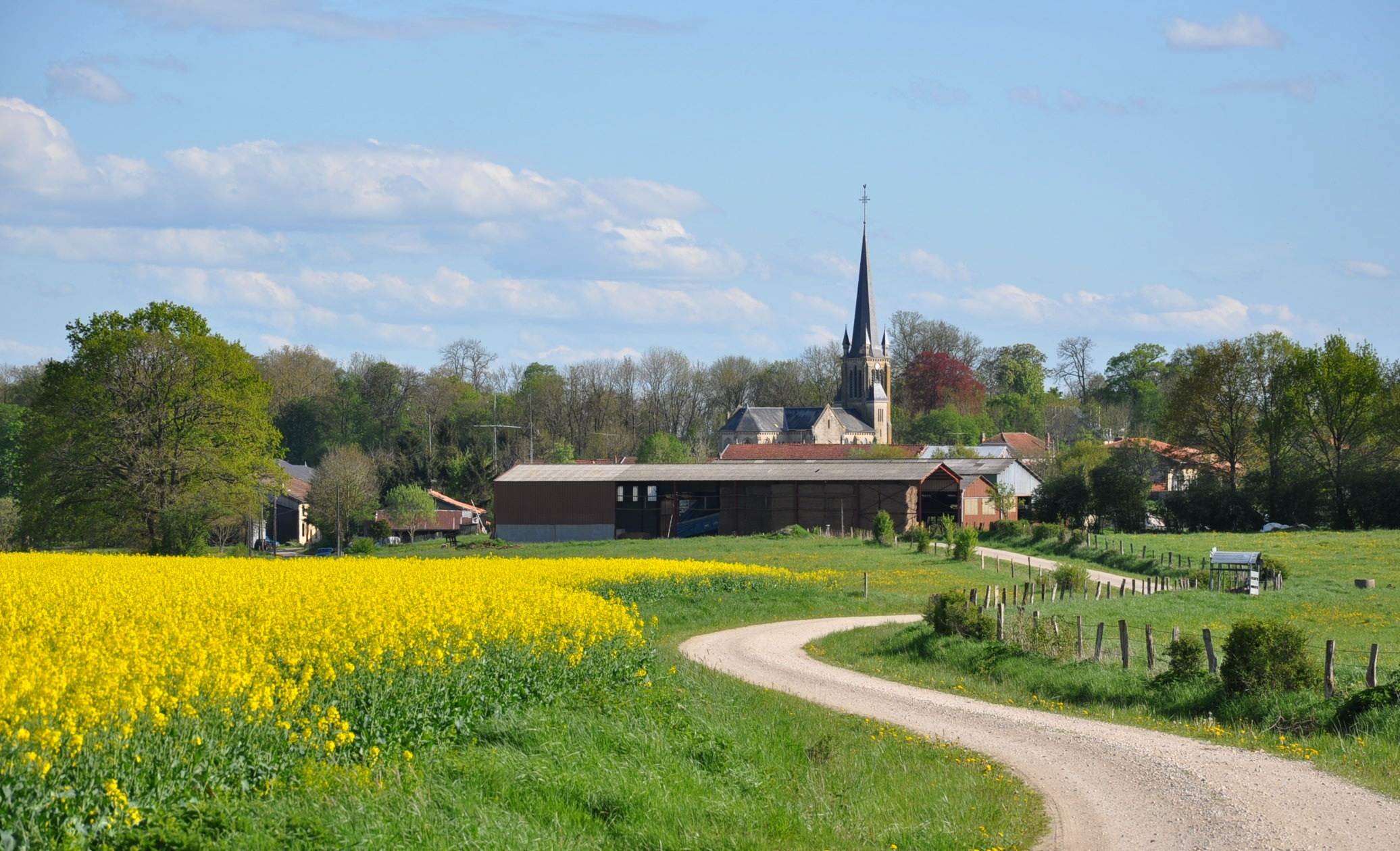
- Waly, seen from the North
- Location of Waly
- Location within France Location within Grand Est
- Coordinates: 49°01′13″N 5°06′27″E
- Country: France
- Region: Grand Est
- Department: Meuse
- Arrondissement: Bar-le-Duc
- Canton: Dieue-sur-Meuse
- Intercommunality: De l'Aire à l'Argonne

Government
  - Mayor (2020–2026): Sabrina Dejean
- Area^{1}: 6.2 km^{2} (2.4 sq mi)
- Elevation: 200 m (660 ft)
- Highest elevation: 305 m (1,001 ft)
- Lowest elevation: 194 m (636 ft)
- Population (2023): 58
  - Density: 9.4/km^{2} (24/sq mi)
- Time zone: UTC+01:00 (CET)
  - Summer (DST): UTC+02:00 (CEST)
- INSEE/Postal code: 55577 /55250
- ^{1} French Land Register data, which excludes lakes, ponds, glaciers > 1 km^{2} (0.386 sq mi or 247 acres) and river estuaries.

Waly is a village and a commune in the Meuse department in Grand Est in north-eastern France. It is the only village in the commune.

The Church of St. Catherine in Waly was consecrated September 26, 1897 by the Bishop of Verdun. In Gothic Revival style, the building contains some carved furniture. The church is disproportionately large, considering the small size of the village.

== Population ==
Historical population
Year	Pop.	±% p.a.
1968	98	—
1975	76	−3.57%
1982	60	−3.32%
1990	66	+1.20%
1999	64	−0.34%
2007	57	−1.44%
2012	61	+1.37%
2017	60	−0.33%
2023	58	−0.56%
Source: INSEE

== See also ==
- Communes of the Meuse department
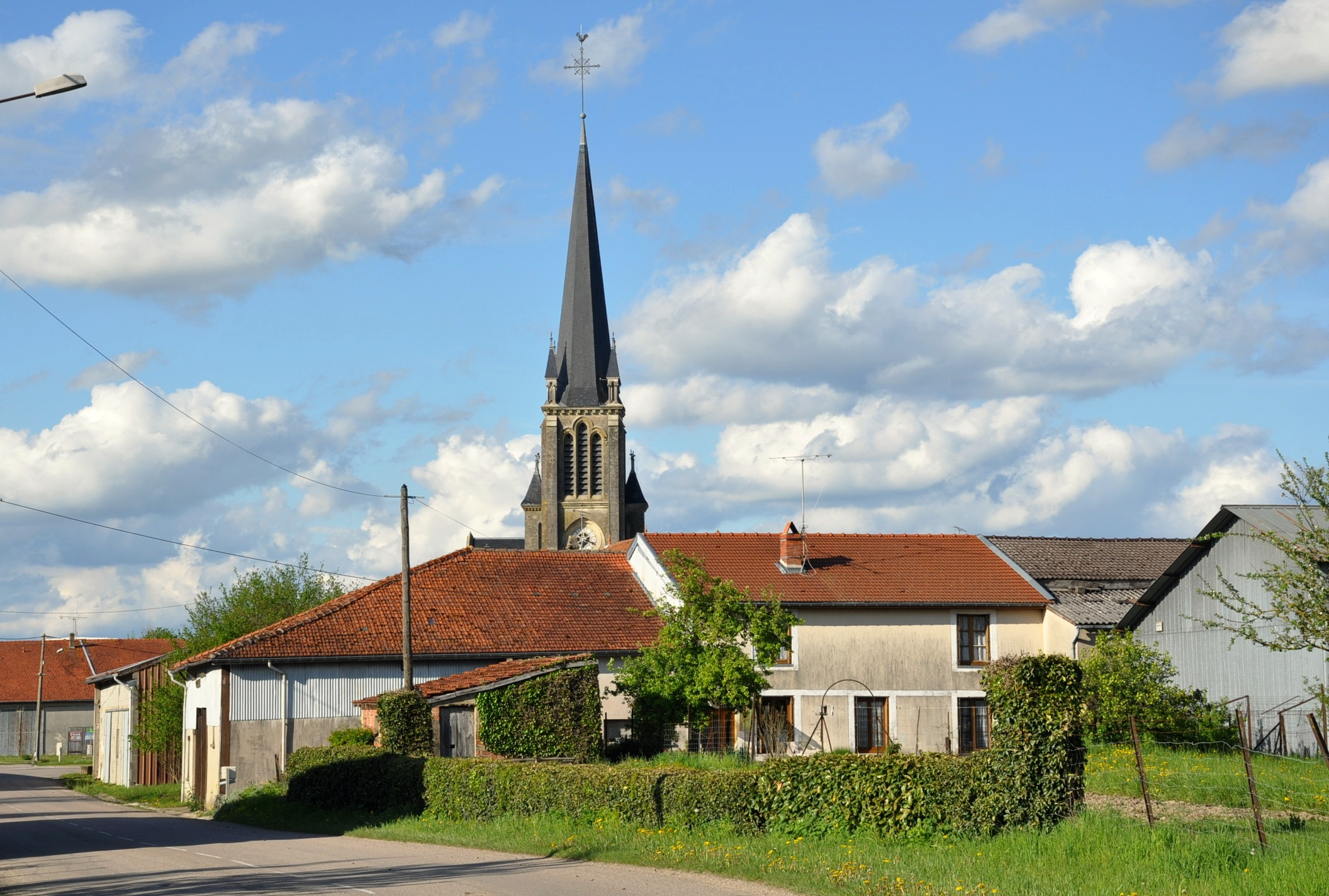
Waly, seen from the Route de Triaucourt

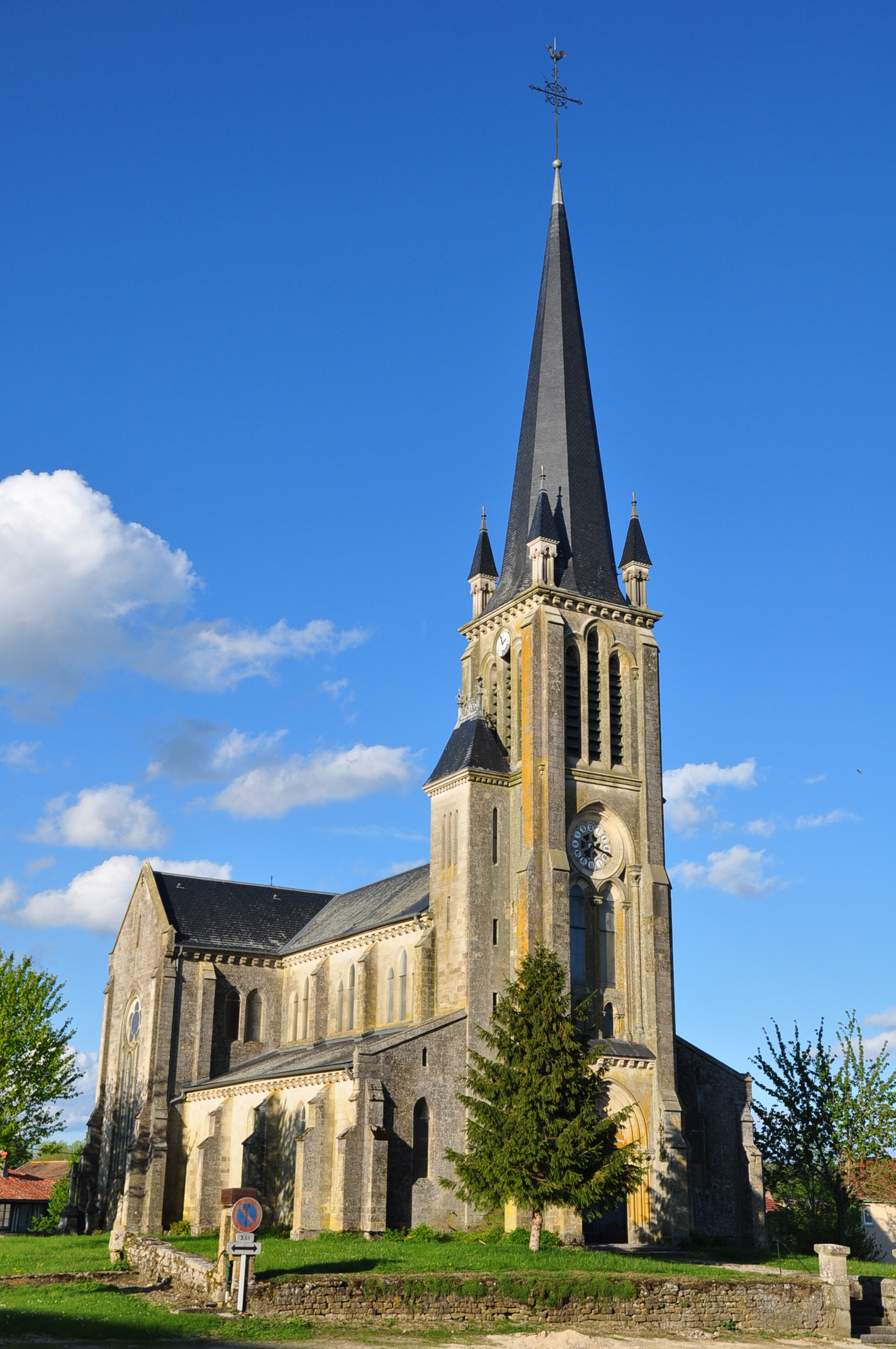
The Church of St. Catherine
