= Landrecourt-Lempire =

- Commune
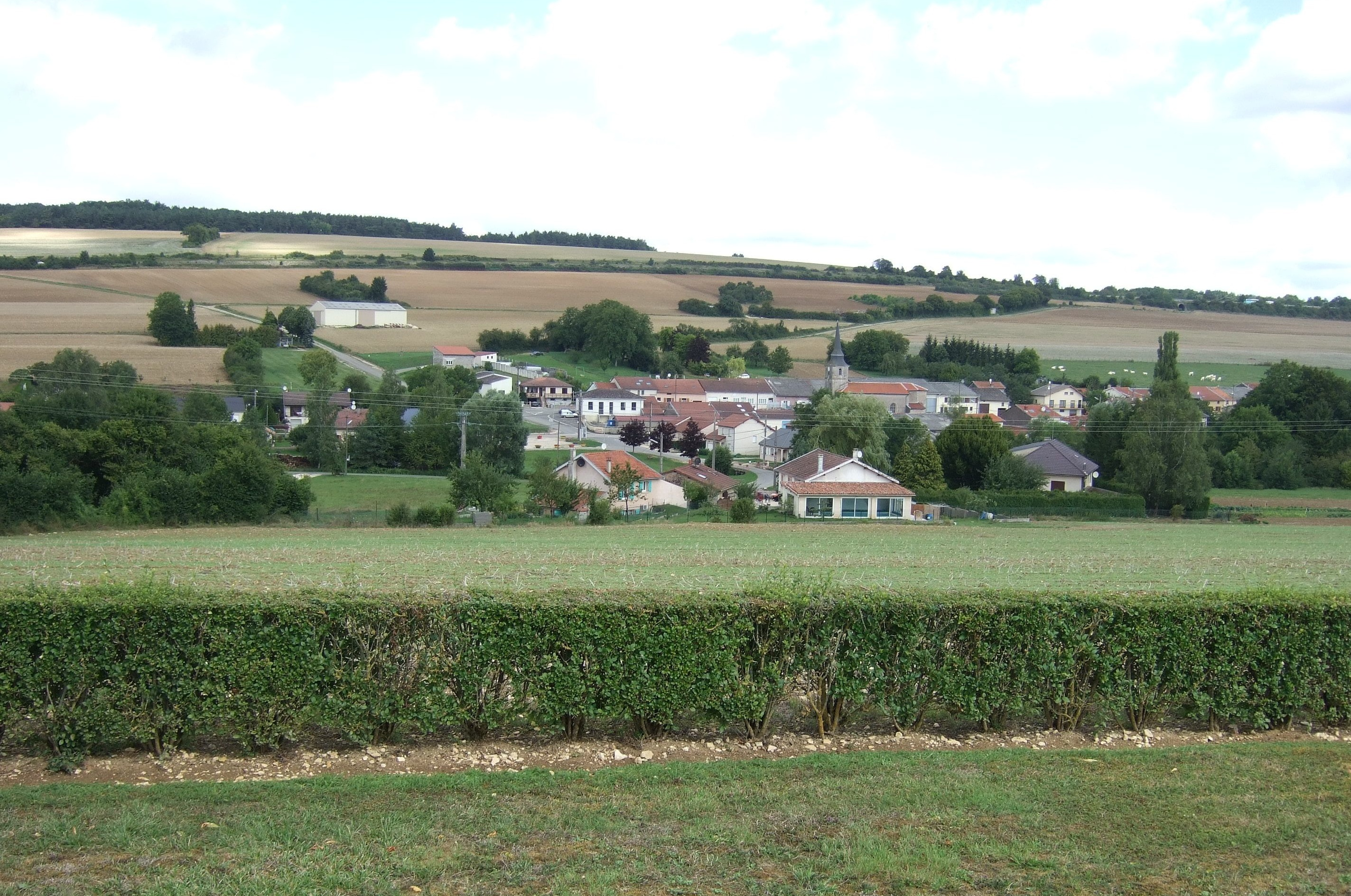
- A general view of Landrecourt

- Coat of arms
- Location of Landrecourt-Lempire
- Location within France Location within Grand Est
- Coordinates: 49°06′16″N 5°20′59″E
- Country: France
- Region: Grand Est
- Department: Meuse
- Arrondissement: Verdun
- Canton: Dieue-sur-Meuse
- Intercommunality: Val de Meuse - Voie Sacrée

Government
  - Mayor (2020–2026): Richard Muller
- Area^{1}: 14.63 km^{2} (5.65 sq mi)
- Elevation: 218 m (715 ft)
- Highest elevation: 326 m (1,070 ft)
- Lowest elevation: 209 m (686 ft)
- Population (2023): 226
  - Density: 15.4/km^{2} (40.0/sq mi)
- Time zone: UTC+01:00 (CET)
  - Summer (DST): UTC+02:00 (CEST)
- INSEE/Postal code: 55276 /55100
- ^{1} French Land Register data, which excludes lakes, ponds, glaciers > 1 km^{2} (0.386 sq mi or 247 acres) and river estuaries.

Landrecourt-Lempire (French pronunciation: [lɑ̃dʁəkuʁ lɑ̃piʁ]) is a commune in the Meuse department in Grand Est in north-eastern France.

== See also ==
- Communes of the Meuse department
