= Récourt-le-Creux =

- Commune
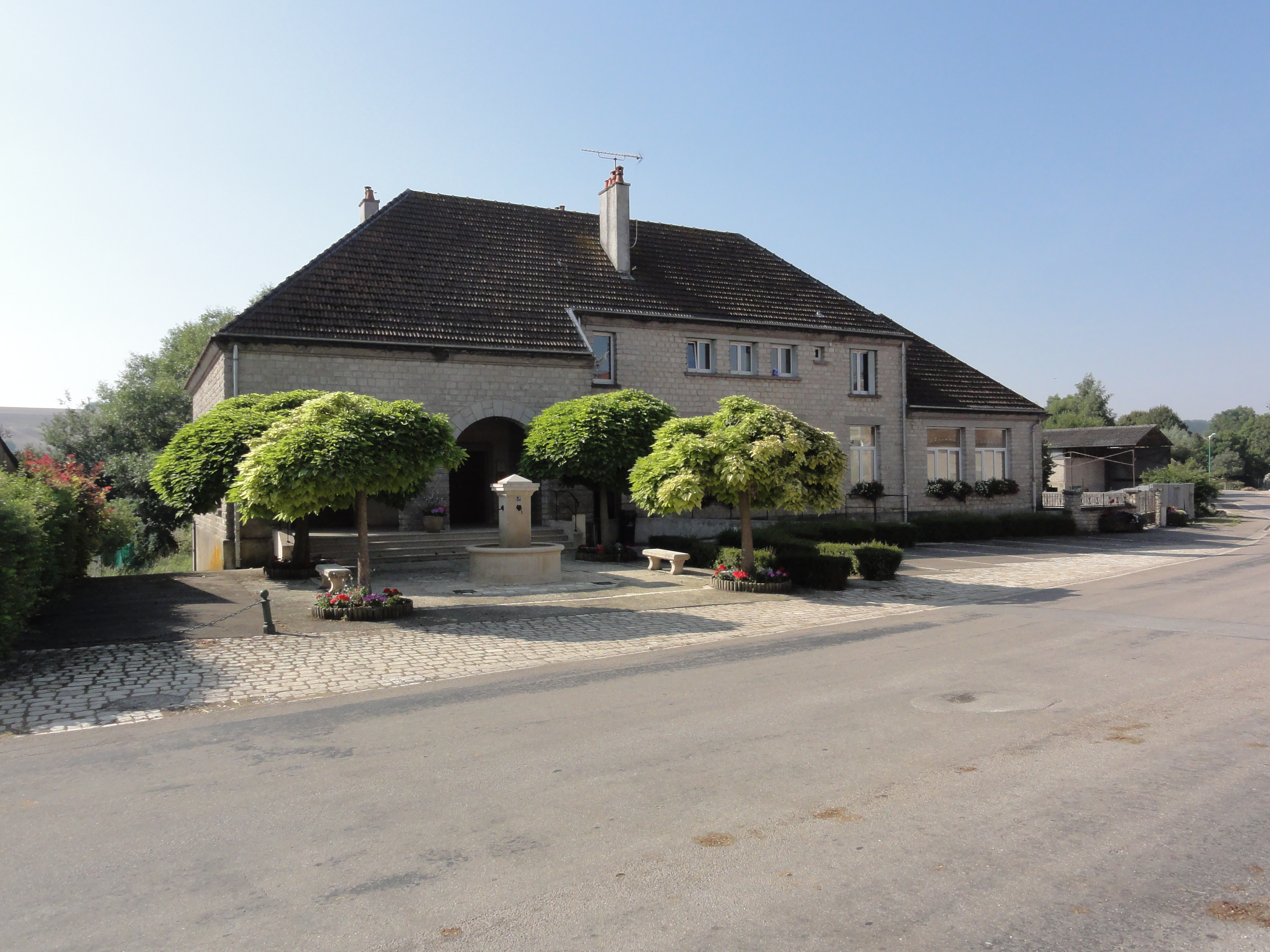
- The town hall in Récourt-le-Creux
- Location of Récourt-le-Creux
- Location within France Location within Grand Est
- Coordinates: 49°00′20″N 5°23′27″E
- Country: France
- Region: Grand Est
- Department: Meuse
- Arrondissement: Verdun
- Canton: Dieue-sur-Meuse
- Intercommunality: Val de Meuse - Voie Sacrée

Government
  - Mayor (2020–2026): Patrick Thugnet
- Area^{1}: 14.43 km^{2} (5.57 sq mi)
- Elevation: 210 m (690 ft)
- Highest elevation: 342 m (1,122 ft)
- Lowest elevation: 207 m (679 ft)
- Population (2023): 64
  - Density: 4.4/km^{2} (11/sq mi)
- Time zone: UTC+01:00 (CET)
  - Summer (DST): UTC+02:00 (CEST)
- INSEE/Postal code: 55420 /55220
- ^{1} French Land Register data, which excludes lakes, ponds, glaciers > 1 km^{2} (0.386 sq mi or 247 acres) and river estuaries.

Récourt-le-Creux (French pronunciation: [ʁekuʁ lə kʁø]) is a commune in the Meuse department in Grand Est in north-eastern France.

== See also ==
- Communes of the Meuse department
