= Osches =

- Commune
- Coat of arms
- Location of Osches
- Location within France Location within Grand Est
- Coordinates: 49°02′50″N 5°15′14″E
- Country: France
- Region: Grand Est
- Department: Meuse
- Arrondissement: Verdun
- Canton: Dieue-sur-Meuse
- Intercommunality: Val de Meuse - Voie Sacrée

Government
  - Mayor (2020–2026): Jean-Pierre Jaunel
- Area^{1}: 9.14 km^{2} (3.53 sq mi)
- Elevation: 290 m (950 ft)
- Highest elevation: 336 m (1,102 ft)
- Lowest elevation: 266 m (873 ft)
- Population (2023): 60
  - Density: 6.6/km^{2} (17/sq mi)
- Time zone: UTC+01:00 (CET)
  - Summer (DST): UTC+02:00 (CEST)
- INSEE/Postal code: 55395 /55220
- ^{1} French Land Register data, which excludes lakes, ponds, glaciers > 1 km^{2} (0.386 sq mi or 247 acres) and river estuaries.

Osches (French pronunciation: [ɔʃ]) is a commune in the Meuse department in Grand Est in north-eastern France.

== See also ==
- Communes of the Meuse department
