= Gimécourt =

- Commune
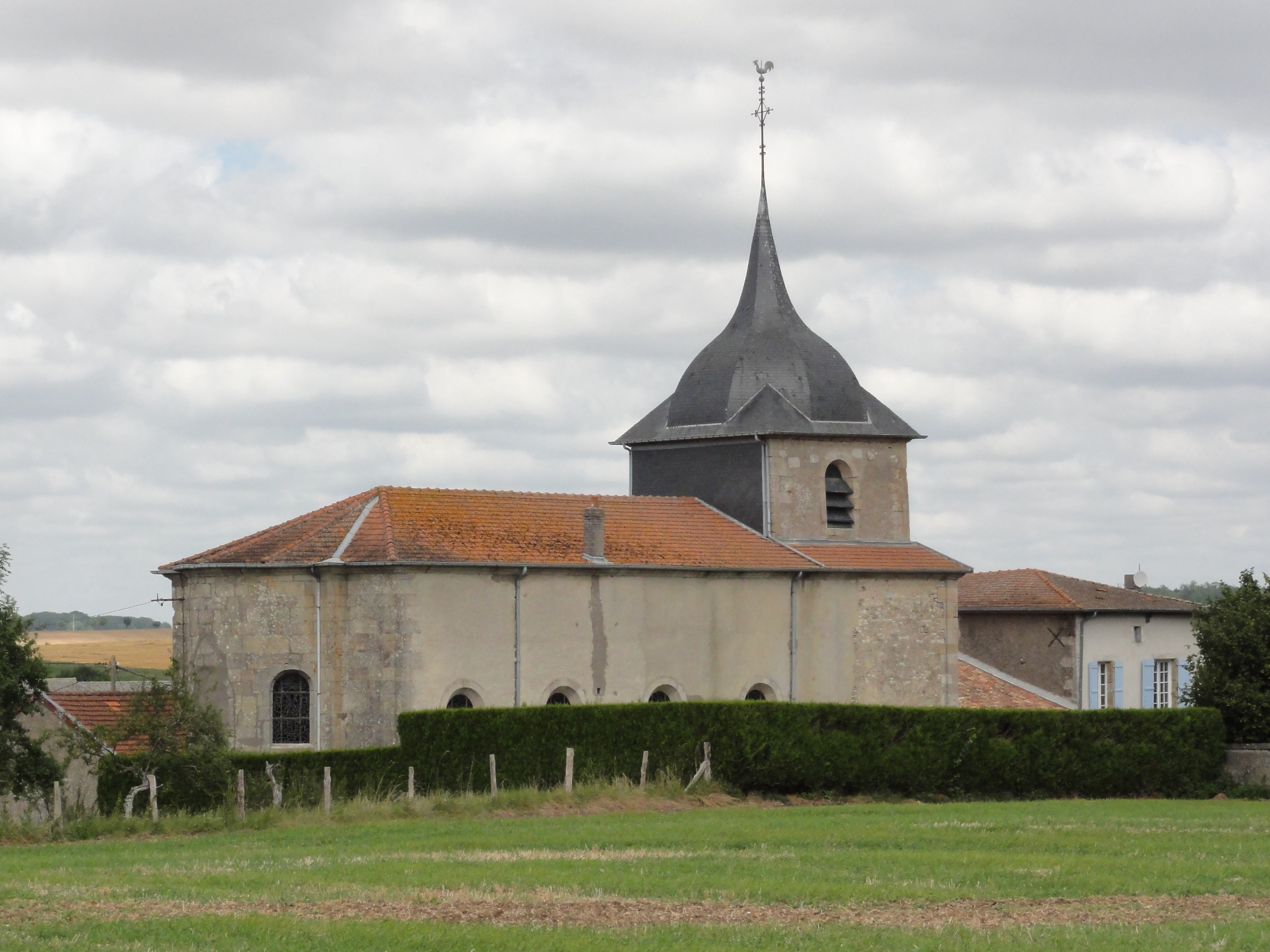
- The church in Gimécourt

- Coat of arms
- Location of Gimécourt
- Location within France Location within Grand Est
- Coordinates: 48°51′00″N 5°22′10″E
- Country: France
- Region: Grand Est
- Department: Meuse
- Arrondissement: Commercy
- Canton: Dieue-sur-Meuse
- Intercommunality: CC de l'Aire à l'Argonne

Government
  - Mayor (2020–2026): Mathilde Decheppe
- Area^{1}: 10.12 km^{2} (3.91 sq mi)
- Elevation: 330 m (1,080 ft)
- Highest elevation: 346 m (1,135 ft)
- Lowest elevation: 262 m (860 ft)
- Population (2023): 37
  - Density: 3.7/km^{2} (9.5/sq mi)
- Time zone: UTC+01:00 (CET)
  - Summer (DST): UTC+02:00 (CEST)
- INSEE/Postal code: 55210 /55260
- ^{1} French Land Register data, which excludes lakes, ponds, glaciers > 1 km^{2} (0.386 sq mi or 247 acres) and river estuaries.

Gimécourt (French pronunciation: [ʒimekuʁ]) is a commune in the Meuse department in Grand Est in north-eastern France.

== See also ==
- Communes of the Meuse department
