= Bouquemont =

- Commune
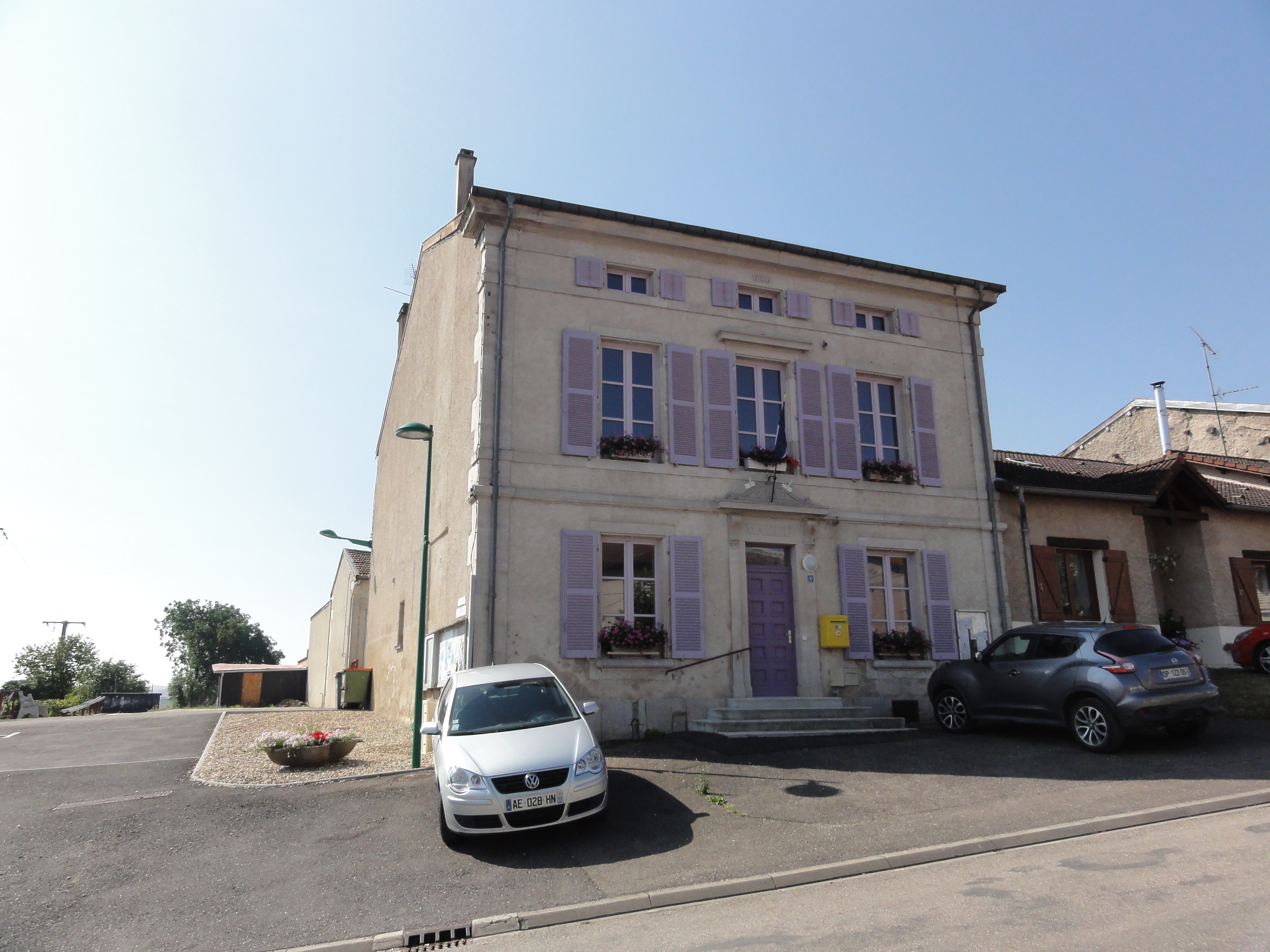
- The town hall in Bouquemont

- Coat of arms
- Location of Bouquemont
- Location within France Location within Grand Est
- Coordinates: 48°59′30″N 5°27′08″E
- Country: France
- Region: Grand Est
- Department: Meuse
- Arrondissement: Commercy
- Canton: Dieue-sur-Meuse

Government
  - Mayor (2020–2026): Sylvine Josselin
- Area^{1}: 7.49 km^{2} (2.89 sq mi)
- Elevation: 216 m (709 ft)
- Highest elevation: 348 m (1,142 ft)
- Lowest elevation: 209 m (686 ft)
- Population (2023): 119
  - Density: 15.9/km^{2} (41.1/sq mi)
- Time zone: UTC+01:00 (CET)
  - Summer (DST): UTC+02:00 (CEST)
- INSEE/Postal code: 55064 /55300
- ^{1} French Land Register data, which excludes lakes, ponds, glaciers > 1 km^{2} (0.386 sq mi or 247 acres) and river estuaries.

Bouquemont (French pronunciation: [bukmɔ̃]) is a commune in the Meuse department in Grand Est in northeastern France.

== Population ==
Historical population
Year	Pop.	±% p.a.
1968	130	—
1975	111	−2.23%
1982	100	−1.48%
1990	101	+0.12%
1999	107	+0.64%
2007	93	−1.74%
2012	128	+6.60%
2017	111	−2.81%
2023	119	+1.17%
Source: INSEE

== See also ==
- Communes of the Meuse department
