= Dompcevrin =

- Commune
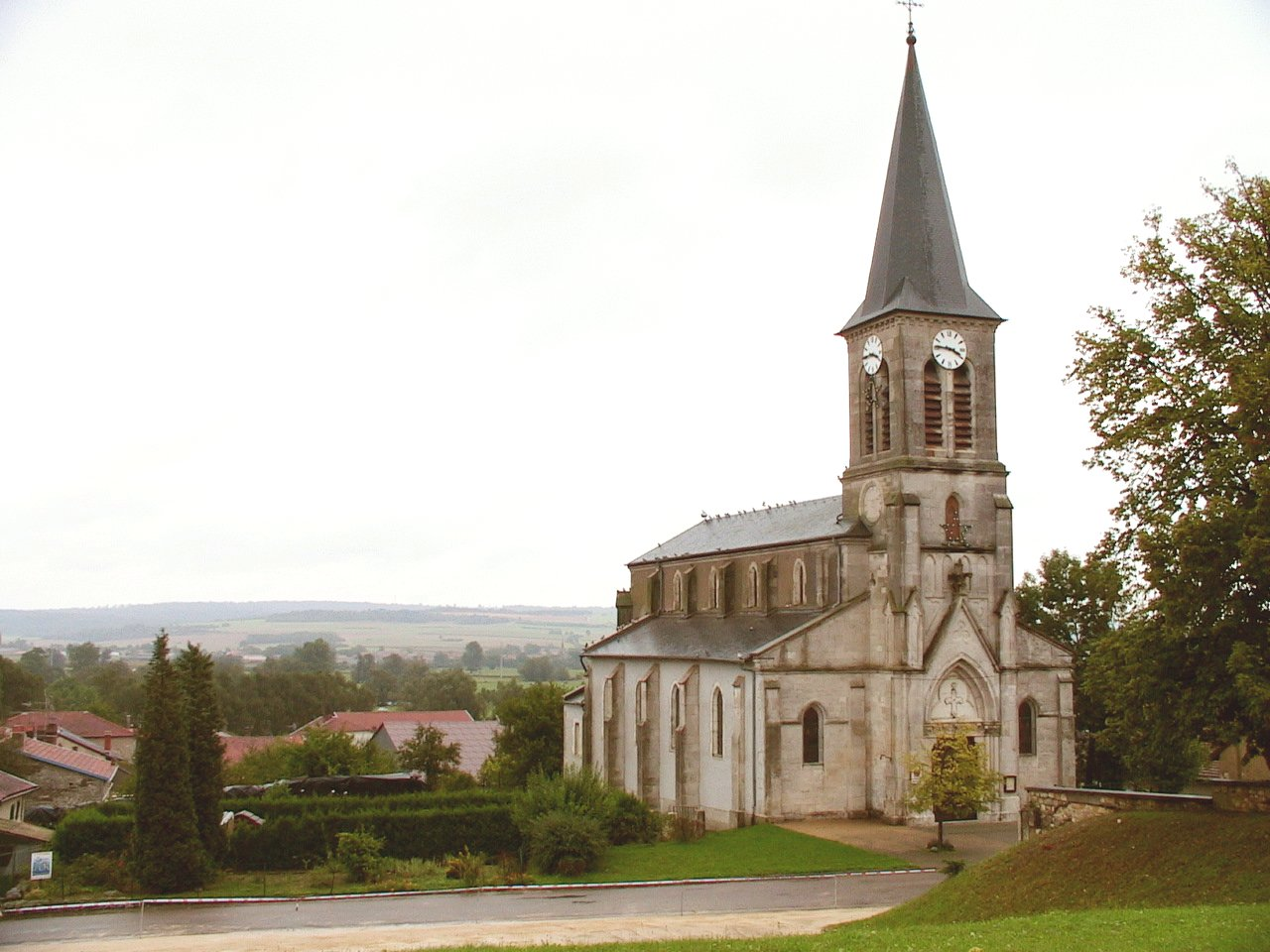
- The church in Dompcevrin

- Coat of arms
- Location of Dompcevrin
- Location within France Location within Grand Est
- Coordinates: 48°55′58″N 5°29′26″E
- Country: France
- Region: Grand Est
- Department: Meuse
- Arrondissement: Commercy
- Canton: Dieue-sur-Meuse
- Intercommunality: CC du Sammiellois

Government
  - Mayor (2020–2026): Louis Zwatan
- Area^{1}: 10.93 km^{2} (4.22 sq mi)
- Elevation: 241 m (791 ft)
- Highest elevation: 358 m (1,175 ft)
- Lowest elevation: 212 m (696 ft)
- Population (2023): 376
  - Density: 34.4/km^{2} (89.1/sq mi)
- Time zone: UTC+01:00 (CET)
  - Summer (DST): UTC+02:00 (CEST)
- INSEE/Postal code: 55159 /55300
- ^{1} French Land Register data, which excludes lakes, ponds, glaciers > 1 km^{2} (0.386 sq mi or 247 acres) and river estuaries.

Dompcevrin (French pronunciation: [dɔ̃səvʁɛ̃]) is a commune in the Meuse department in Grand Est in northeastern France.

== See also ==
- Communes of the Meuse department
