= Lahaymeix =

- Commune
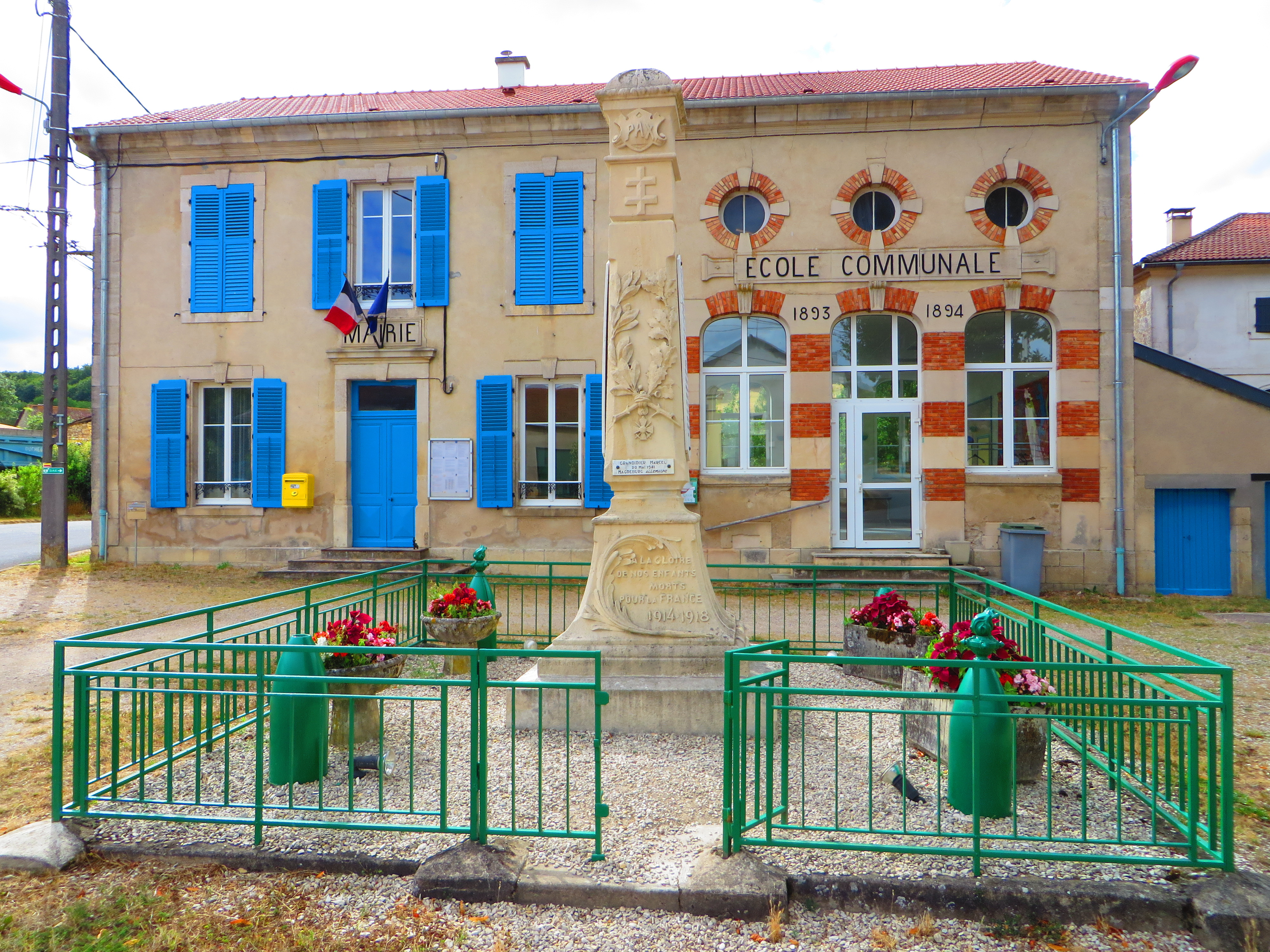
- The town hall in Lahaymeix

- Coat of arms
- Location of Lahaymeix
- Location within France Location within Grand Est
- Coordinates: 48°56′23″N 5°24′39″E
- Country: France
- Region: Grand Est
- Department: Meuse
- Arrondissement: Commercy
- Canton: Dieue-sur-Meuse
- Intercommunality: CC de l'Aire à l'Argonne

Government
  - Mayor (2020–2026): Raymond Leclerc
- Area^{1}: 12.7 km^{2} (4.9 sq mi)
- Elevation: 265 m (869 ft)
- Highest elevation: 353 m (1,158 ft)
- Lowest elevation: 240 m (790 ft)
- Population (2023): 76
  - Density: 6.0/km^{2} (15/sq mi)
- Time zone: UTC+01:00 (CET)
  - Summer (DST): UTC+02:00 (CEST)
- INSEE/Postal code: 55269 /55260
- ^{1} French Land Register data, which excludes lakes, ponds, glaciers > 1 km^{2} (0.386 sq mi or 247 acres) and river estuaries.

Lahaymeix is a commune in the Meuse department in Grand Est in north-eastern France.

== See also ==
- Communes of the Meuse department
