= Èvres =

- Commune
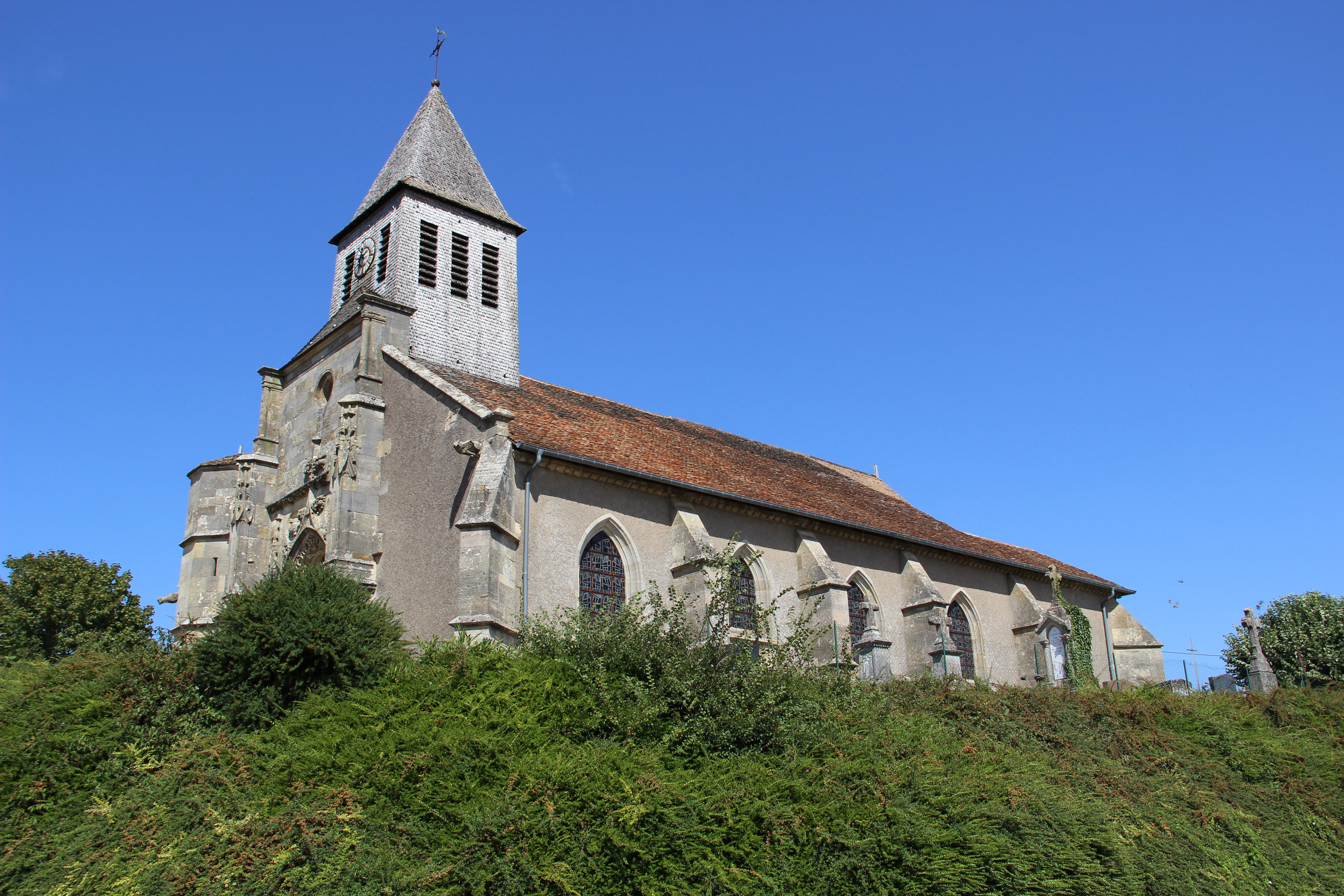
- The church in Èvres

- Coat of arms
- Location of Èvres
- Location within France Location within Grand Est
- Coordinates: 48°59′01″N 5°07′29″E
- Country: France
- Region: Grand Est
- Department: Meuse
- Arrondissement: Bar-le-Duc
- Canton: Dieue-sur-Meuse
- Intercommunality: CC de l'Aire à l'Argonne

Government
  - Mayor (2020–2026): Clément Fevez
- Area^{1}: 11.65 km^{2} (4.50 sq mi)
- Elevation: 250 m (820 ft)
- Highest elevation: 246 m (807 ft)
- Lowest elevation: 186 m (610 ft)
- Population (2023): 90
  - Density: 7.7/km^{2} (20/sq mi)
- Time zone: UTC+01:00 (CET)
  - Summer (DST): UTC+02:00 (CEST)
- INSEE/Postal code: 55185 /55250
- ^{1} French Land Register data, which excludes lakes, ponds, glaciers > 1 km^{2} (0.386 sq mi or 247 acres) and river estuaries.

Èvres (French pronunciation: [ɛvʁ]) is a commune in the Meuse department in Grand Est in north-eastern France.

== See also ==
- Communes of the Meuse department
