= Bannoncourt =

- Commune
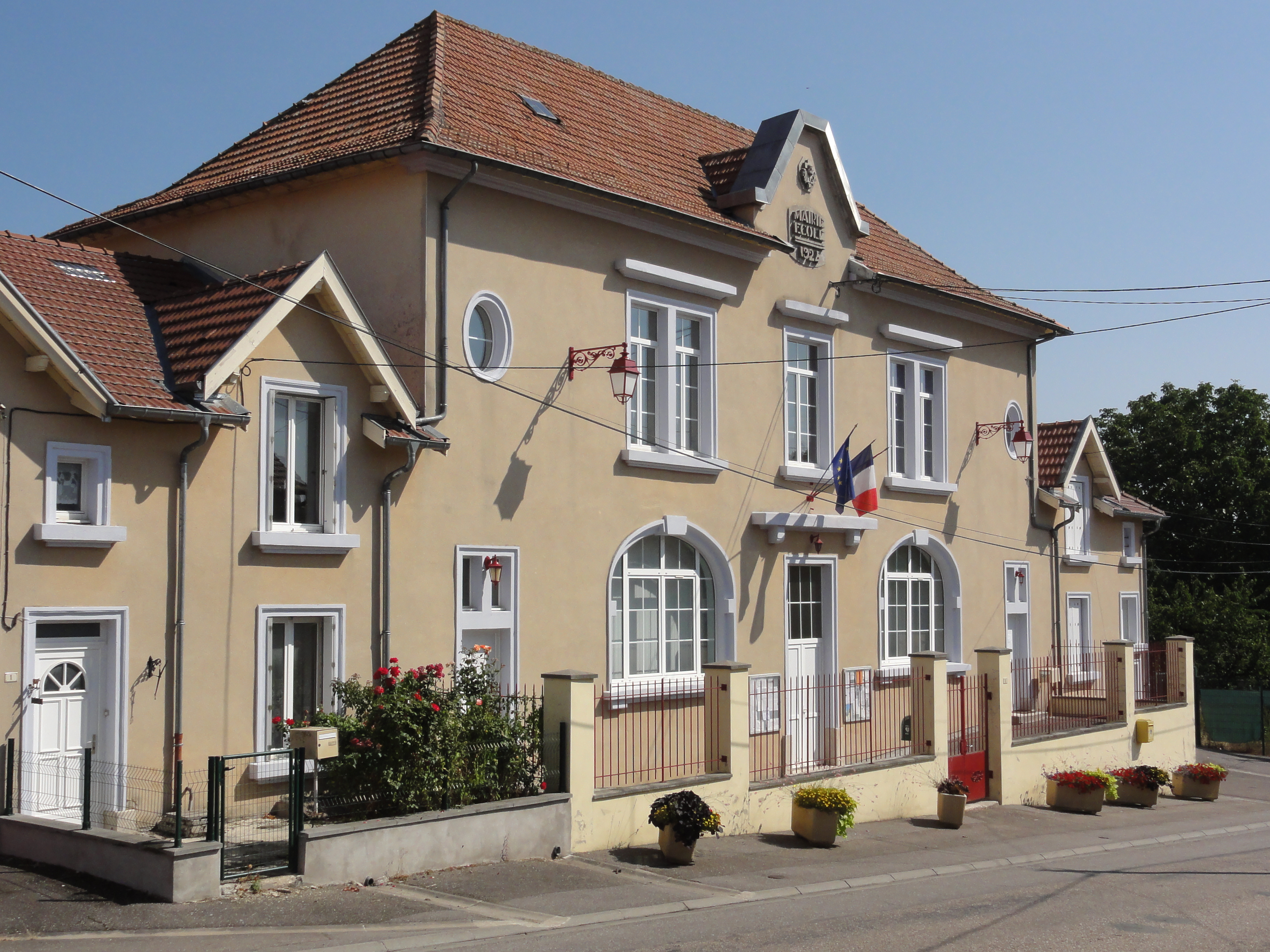
- The town hall in Bannoncourt

- Coat of arms
- Location of Bannoncourt
- Location within France Location within Grand Est
- Coordinates: 48°57′35″N 5°30′00″E
- Country: France
- Region: Grand Est
- Department: Meuse
- Arrondissement: Commercy
- Canton: Dieue-sur-Meuse
- Intercommunality: Sammiellois

Government
  - Mayor (2020–2026): Véronique Jacquesson
- Area^{1}: 8.72 km^{2} (3.37 sq mi)
- Elevation: 219 m (719 ft)
- Highest elevation: 329 m (1,079 ft)
- Lowest elevation: 210 m (690 ft)
- Population (2023): 159
  - Density: 18.2/km^{2} (47.2/sq mi)
- Time zone: UTC+01:00 (CET)
  - Summer (DST): UTC+02:00 (CEST)
- INSEE/Postal code: 55027 /55300
- ^{1} French Land Register data, which excludes lakes, ponds, glaciers > 1 km^{2} (0.386 sq mi or 247 acres) and river estuaries.

Bannoncourt (French pronunciation: [banɔ̃kuʁ]) is a commune in the Meuse department in the Grand Est region in northeastern France.

== Population ==
Historical population
Year	Pop.	±% p.a.
1968	165	—
1975	155	−0.89%
1982	151	−0.37%
1990	163	+0.96%
1999	195	+2.01%
2007	184	−0.72%
2012	164	−2.28%
2017	155	−1.12%
2023	159	+0.43%
Source: INSEE

== See also ==
- Communes of the Meuse department
