= Ancemont =

- Commune
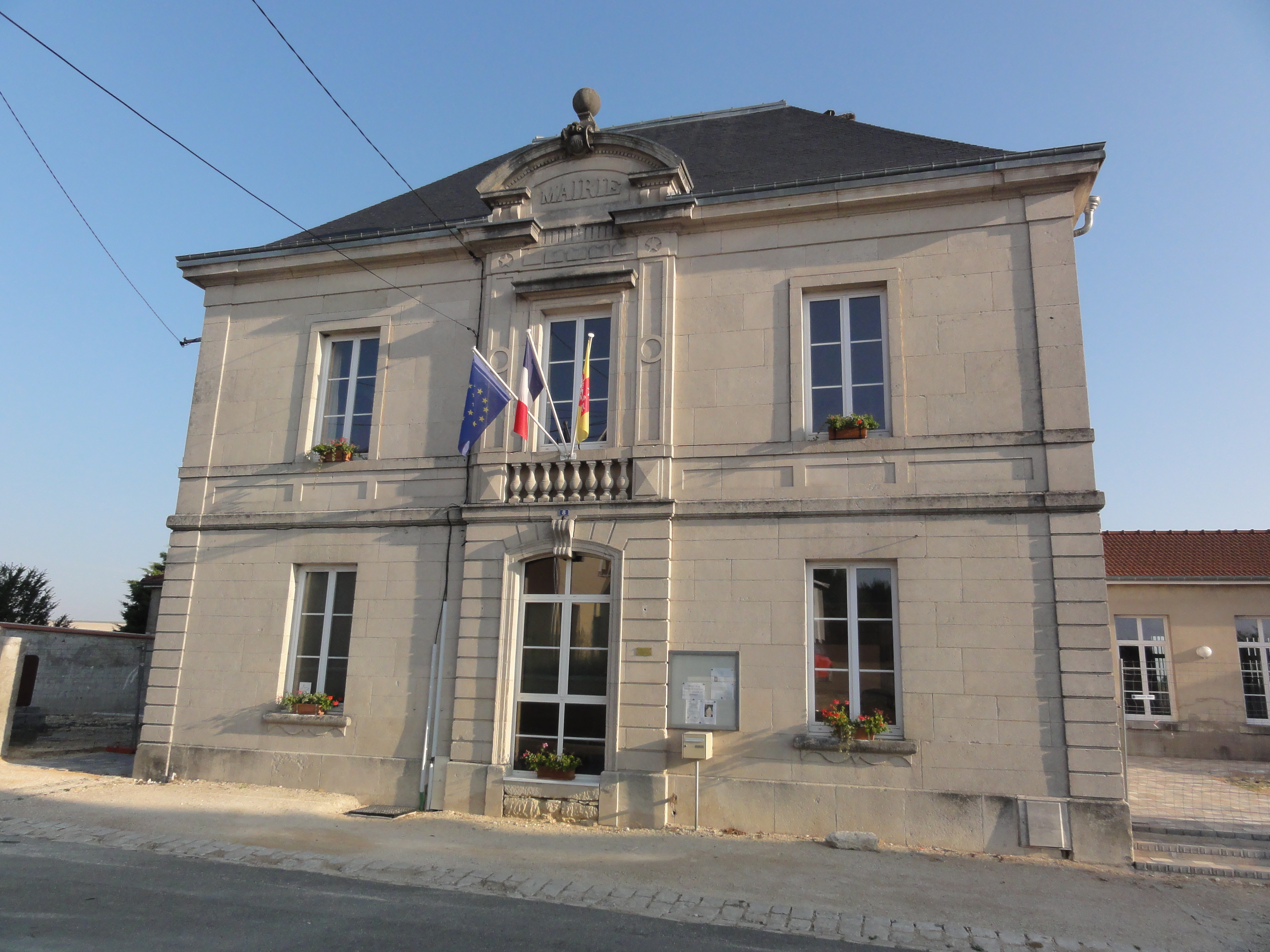
- The town hall in Ancemont

- Coat of arms
- Location of Ancemont
- Location within France Location within Grand Est
- Coordinates: 49°04′19″N 5°24′25″E
- Country: France
- Region: Grand Est
- Department: Meuse
- Arrondissement: Verdun
- Canton: Dieue-sur-Meuse
- Intercommunality: Val de Meuse - Voie Sacrée

Government
  - Mayor (2020–2026): Catherine Collinet-Jung
- Area^{1}: 13.3 km^{2} (5.1 sq mi)
- Elevation: 204 m (669 ft)
- Highest elevation: 330 m (1,080 ft)
- Lowest elevation: 199 m (653 ft)
- Population (2023): 527
  - Density: 39.6/km^{2} (103/sq mi)
- Time zone: UTC+01:00 (CET)
  - Summer (DST): UTC+02:00 (CEST)
- INSEE/Postal code: 55009 /55320
- ^{1} French Land Register data, which excludes lakes, ponds, glaciers > 1 km^{2} (0.386 sq mi or 247 acres) and river estuaries.

Ancemont (French pronunciation: [ɑ̃smɔ̃]) is a commune in the Meuse department in the Grand Est region in northeastern France.

== Population ==
Historical population
Year	Pop.	±% p.a.
1968	586	—
1975	615	+0.69%
1982	635	+0.46%
1990	654	+0.37%
1999	591	−1.12%
2007	569	−0.47%
2012	601	+1.10%
2017	551	−1.72%
2023	527	−0.74%
Source: INSEE

== See also ==
- Communes of the Meuse department
