= Cousances-les-Forges =

- Commune
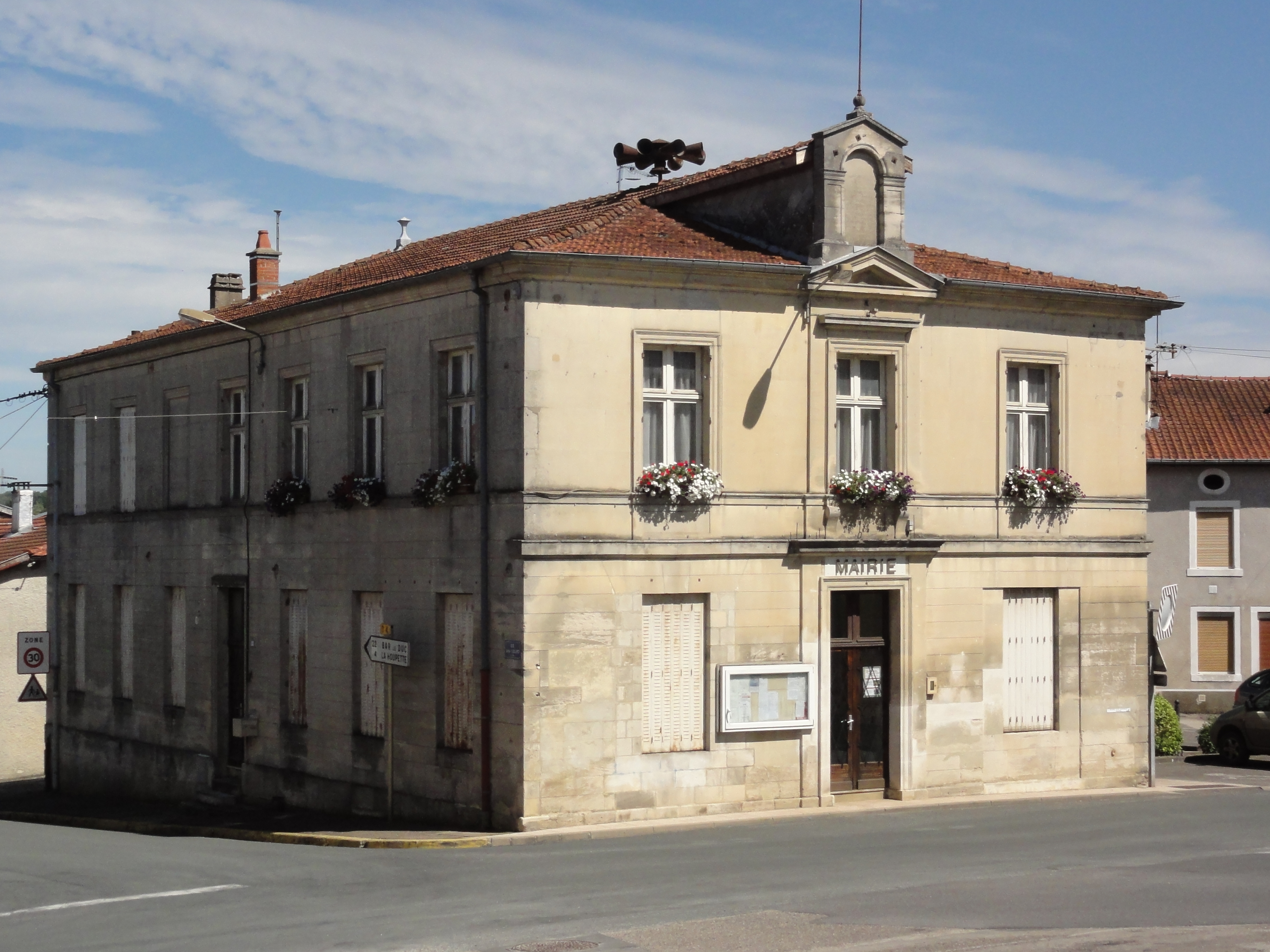
- The town hall in Cousances-les-Forges

- Coat of arms
- Location of Cousances-les-Forges
- Location within France Location within Grand Est
- Coordinates: 48°36′40″N 5°05′06″E
- Country: France
- Region: Grand Est
- Department: Meuse
- Arrondissement: Bar-le-Duc
- Canton: Ancerville
- Intercommunality: CC Portes de Meuse

Government
  - Mayor (2020–2026): Francis Thirion
- Area^{1}: 18.13 km^{2} (7.00 sq mi)
- Elevation: 175 m (574 ft)
- Highest elevation: 263 m (863 ft)
- Lowest elevation: 157 m (515 ft)
- Population (2023): 1,621
  - Density: 89.41/km^{2} (231.6/sq mi)
- Time zone: UTC+01:00 (CET)
  - Summer (DST): UTC+02:00 (CEST)
- INSEE/Postal code: 55132 /55170
- ^{1} French Land Register data, which excludes lakes, ponds, glaciers > 1 km^{2} (0.386 sq mi or 247 acres) and river estuaries.

Cousances-les-Forges (French pronunciation: [kuzɑ̃s le fɔʁʒ]) is a commune in the Meuse department in Grand Est in north-eastern France.

== Geography ==
Cousances-les-Forges is located in the Northeast of France. It is bordered by the following communes: Ancerville, Aulnois-en-Perthois, Chamouilley, Narcy, and Savonnières-en-Perthois.

=== Climate ===
In 2010, the climate of the commune was of the mountain type, according to a study by the National Center for Scientific Research based on a series of data covering the period 1971-2000. In 2020, Météo-France published a typology of the climates of metropolitan France in which the commune is exposed to an altered oceanic climate and is in the climatic region Lorraine, plateau de Langres, Morvan, characterized by a harsh winter (1.5 °C), moderate winds and frequent fogs in autumn and winter.

== See also ==
- Communes of the Meuse department
