= Tronville-en-Barrois =

- Commune
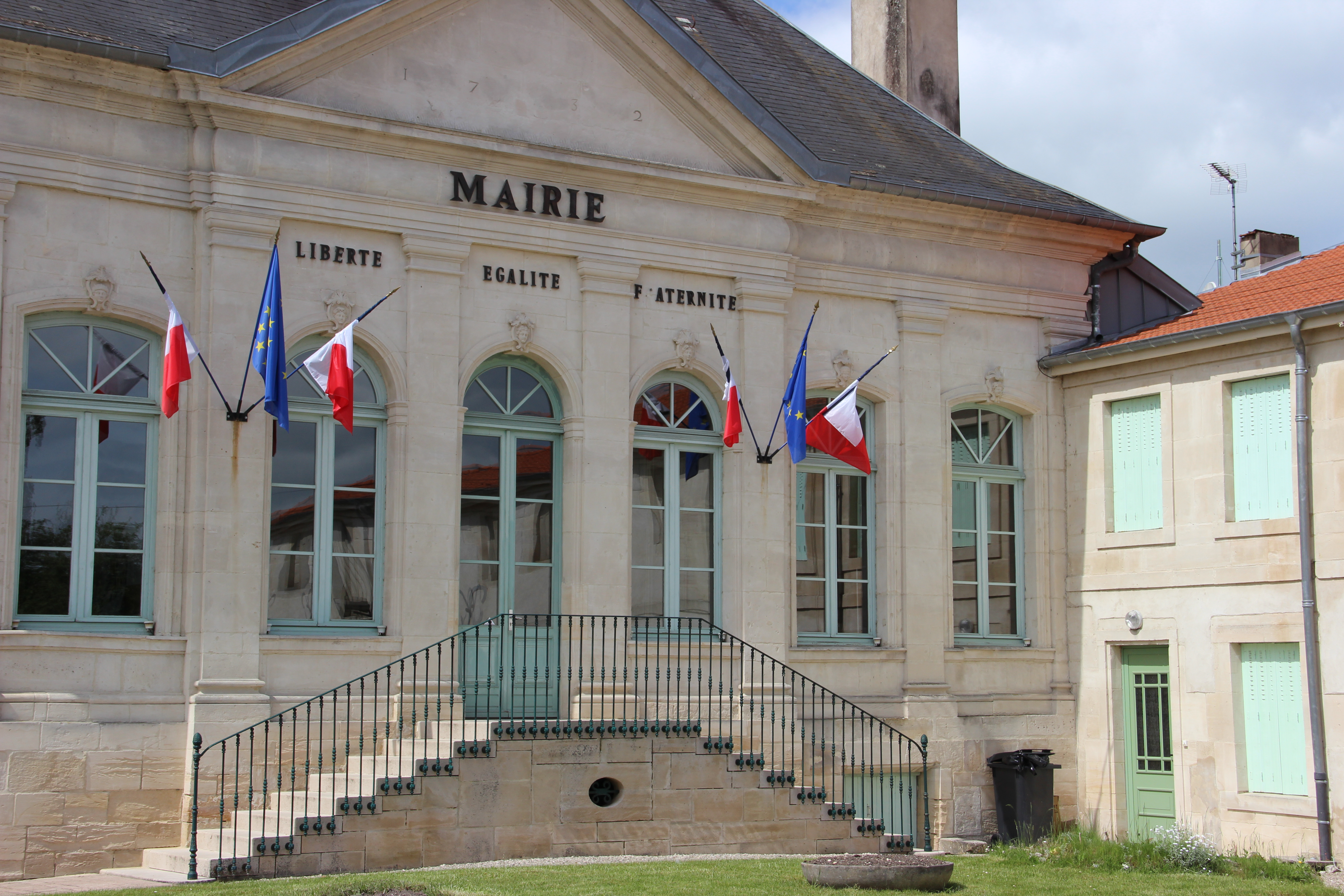
- The town hall in Tronville-en-Barrois

- Coat of arms
- Location of Tronville-en-Barrois
- Location within France Location within Grand Est
- Coordinates: 48°43′16″N 5°16′45″E
- Country: France
- Region: Grand Est
- Department: Meuse
- Arrondissement: Bar-le-Duc
- Canton: Ancerville
- Intercommunality: CA Bar-le-Duc - Sud Meuse

Government
  - Mayor (2020–2026): Daniel Briat
- Area^{1}: 12.64 km^{2} (4.88 sq mi)
- Highest elevation: 353 m (1,158 ft)
- Lowest elevation: 204 m (669 ft)
- Population (2023): 1,302
  - Density: 103.0/km^{2} (266.8/sq mi)
- Time zone: UTC+01:00 (CET)
  - Summer (DST): UTC+02:00 (CEST)
- INSEE/Postal code: 55519 /55310
- ^{1} French Land Register data, which excludes lakes, ponds, glaciers > 1 km^{2} (0.386 sq mi or 247 acres) and river estuaries.

Tronville-en-Barrois (French pronunciation: [tʁɔ̃vil ɑ̃ baʁwa], lit. 'Tronville in Barrois') is a commune in the Meuse department in Grand Est in north-eastern France.

== See also ==
- Communes of the Meuse department
