= Brillon-en-Barrois =

- Commune
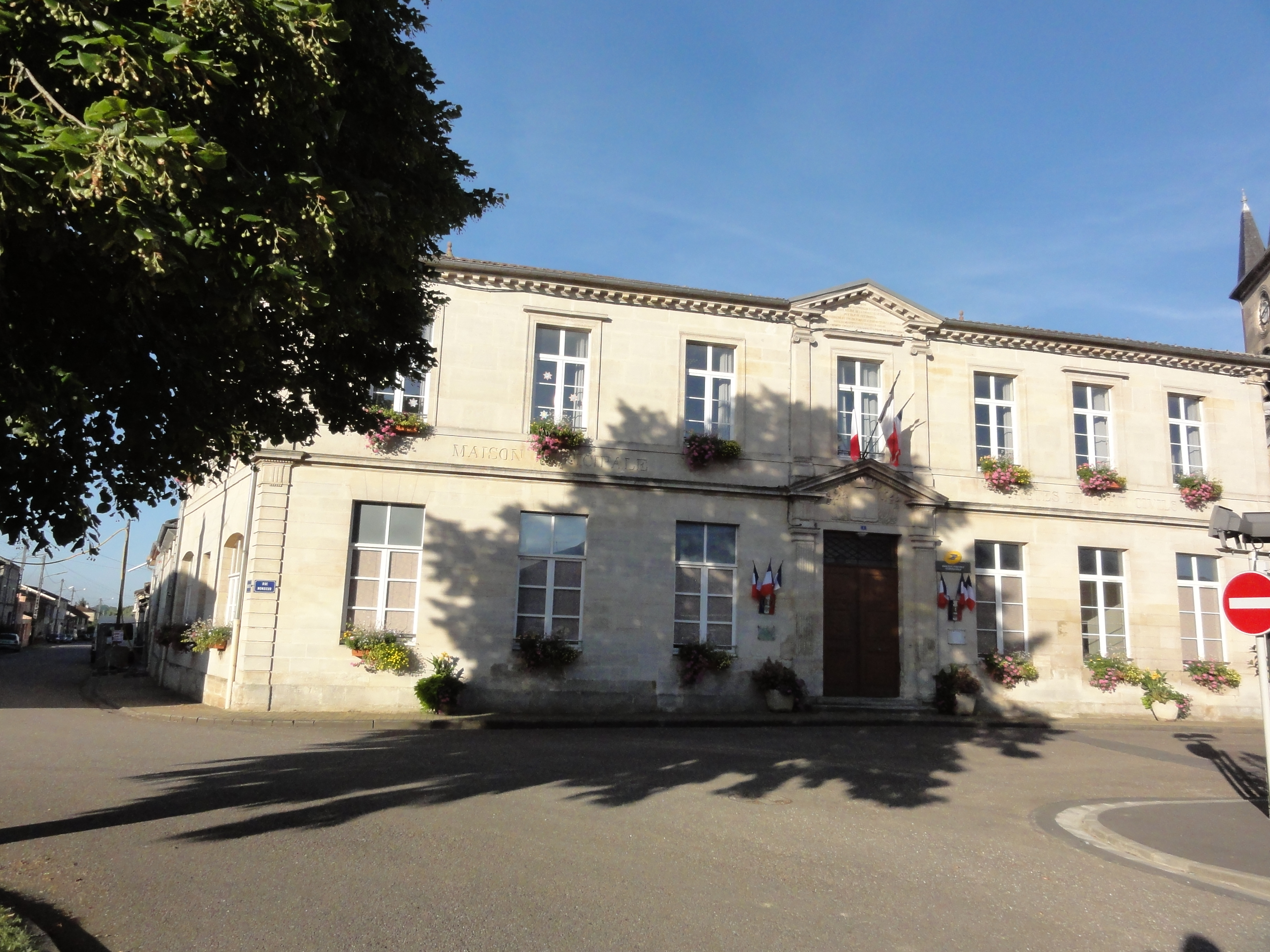
- The town hall in Brillon-en-Barrois

- Coat of arms
- Location of Brillon-en-Barrois
- Location within France Location within Grand Est
- Coordinates: 48°42′44″N 5°05′44″E
- Country: France
- Region: Grand Est
- Department: Meuse
- Arrondissement: Bar-le-Duc
- Canton: Ancerville
- Intercommunality: Portes de Meuse

Government
  - Mayor (2020–2026): Florent Renaudin
- Area^{1}: 11.35 km^{2} (4.38 sq mi)
- Elevation: 245 m (804 ft)
- Highest elevation: 278 m (912 ft)
- Lowest elevation: 185 m (607 ft)
- Population (2023): 704
  - Density: 62.0/km^{2} (161/sq mi)
- Time zone: UTC+01:00 (CET)
  - Summer (DST): UTC+02:00 (CEST)
- INSEE/Postal code: 55079 /55000
- ^{1} French Land Register data, which excludes lakes, ponds, glaciers > 1 km^{2} (0.386 sq mi or 247 acres) and river estuaries.

Brillon-en-Barrois (French pronunciation: [bʁijɔ̃ ɑ̃ baʁwa], lit. 'Brillon in Barrois') is a commune in the Meuse department in Grand Est in northeastern France.

== Population ==
Historical population
Year	Pop.	±% p.a.
1968	448	—
1975	528	+2.37%
1982	552	+0.64%
1990	630	+1.67%
1999	609	−0.38%
2007	593	−0.33%
2012	606	+0.43%
2017	671	+2.06%
2023	704	+0.80%
Source: INSEE

== See also ==
- Communes of the Meuse department
