= Arrondissement of Bar-le-Duc =

Coordinates: 48°46′N 5°10′E

Bar-le-Duc
- Arrondissement
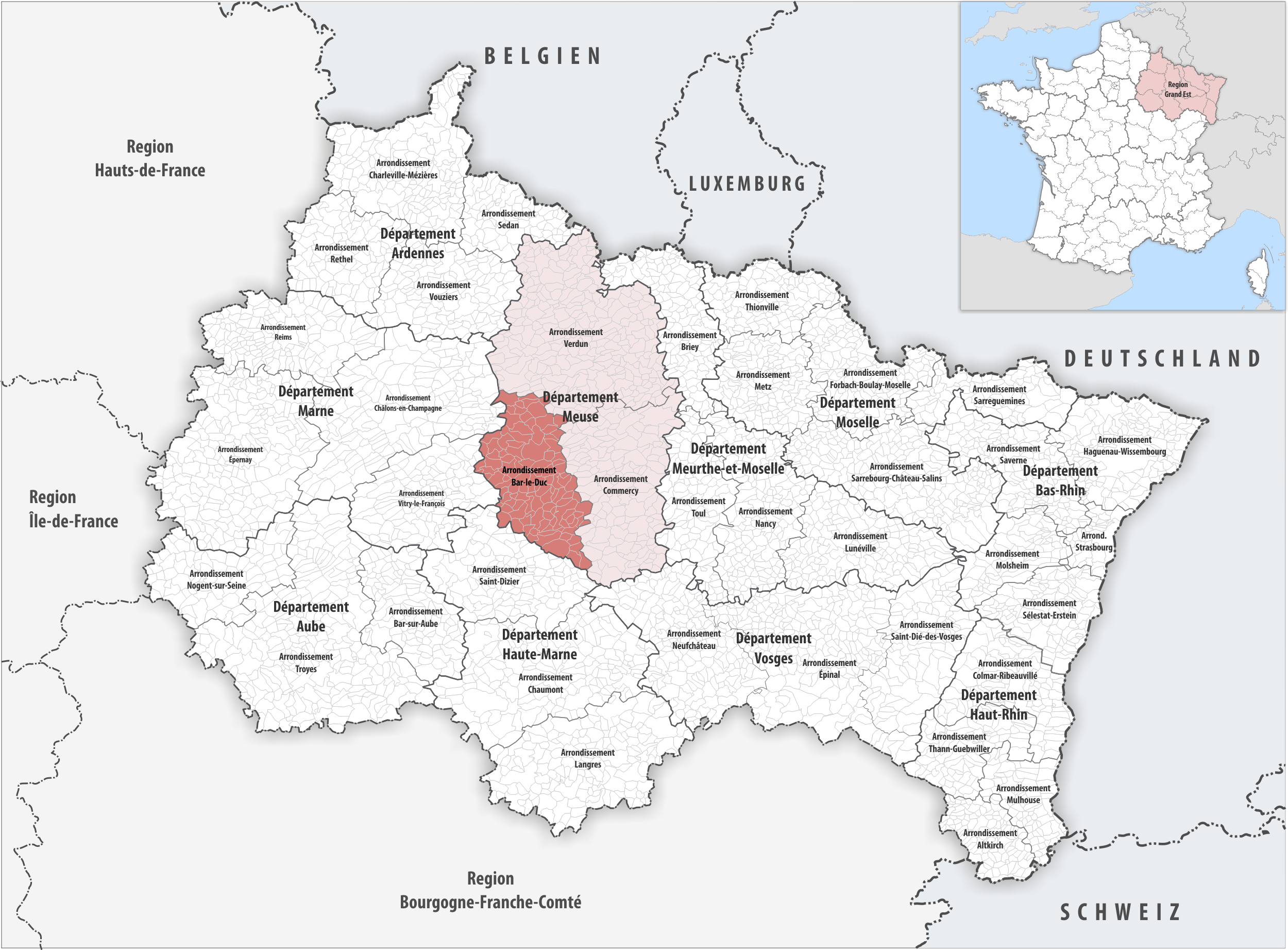
- Location within the region Grand Est
- Country: France
- Region: Grand Est
- Department: Meuse
- No. of communes: {{{nbcomm}}}
- Area: 1,450.6 km^{2} (560.1 sq mi)
- Population (2023): 56,524
  - Density: 38.966/km^{2} (100.92/sq mi)
- INSEE code: 551

The arrondissement of Bar-le-Duc is an arrondissement of France in the Meuse department in the Grand Est region. It has 110 communes. Its population is 57,514 (2021), and its area is 1,450.6 km^{2} (560.1 sq mi).

== Composition ==
The communes of the arrondissement of Bar-le-Duc, and their INSEE codes, are:

1. Ancerville (55010)
2. Andernay (55011)
3. Aulnois-en-Perthois (55015)
4. Autrécourt-sur-Aire (55017)
5. Bar-le-Duc (55029)
6. Baudonvilliers (55031)
7. Bazincourt-sur-Saulx (55035)
8. Beaulieu-en-Argonne (55038)
9. Beausite (55040)
10. Behonne (55041)
11. Beurey-sur-Saulx (55049)
12. Biencourt-sur-Orge (55051)
13. Le Bouchon-sur-Saulx (55061)
14. Brabant-le-Roi (55069)
15. Brauvilliers (55075)
16. Brillon-en-Barrois (55079)
17. Brizeaux (55081)
18. Bure (55087)
19. Chanteraine (55358)
20. Chardogne (55101)
21. Chaumont-sur-Aire (55108)
22. Combles-en-Barrois (55120)
23. Contrisson (55125)
24. Courcelles-sur-Aire (55128)
25. Cousances-les-Forges (55132)
26. Couvertpuis (55133)
27. Couvonges (55134)
28. Culey (55138)
29. Dammarie-sur-Saulx (55144)
30. Érize-la-Brûlée (55175)
31. Érize-la-Petite (55177)
32. Érize-Saint-Dizier (55178)
33. Èvres (55185)
34. Fains-Véel (55186)
35. Foucaucourt-sur-Thabas (55194)
36. Fouchères-aux-Bois (55195)
37. Géry (55207)
38. Givrauval (55214)
39. Guerpont (55221)
40. Haironville (55224)
41. Les Hauts-de-Chée (55123)
42. Hévilliers (55246)
43. Ippécourt (55251)
44. L'Isle-en-Rigault (55296)
45. Juvigny-en-Perthois (55261)
46. Laheycourt (55271)
47. Laimont (55272)
48. Lavincourt (55284)
49. Lavoye (55285)
50. Ligny-en-Barrois (55291)
51. Lisle-en-Barrois (55295)
52. Loisey (55298)
53. Longeaux (55300)
54. Longeville-en-Barrois (55302)
55. Louppy-le-Château (55304)
56. Mandres-en-Barrois (55315)
57. Maulan (55326)
58. Menaucourt (55332)
59. Ménil-sur-Saulx (55335)
60. Mognéville (55340)
61. Montiers-sur-Saulx (55348)
62. Montplonne (55352)
63. Morley (55359)
64. Naives-Rosières (55369)
65. Naix-aux-Forges (55370)
66. Nançois-sur-Ornain (55372)
67. Nant-le-Grand (55373)
68. Nant-le-Petit (55374)
69. Nantois (55376)
70. Nettancourt (55378)
71. Neuville-sur-Ornain (55382)
72. Noyers-Auzécourt (55388)
73. Nubécourt (55389)
74. Pretz-en-Argonne (55409)
75. Raival (55442)
76. Rancourt-sur-Ornain (55414)
77. Rembercourt-Sommaisne (55423)
78. Remennecourt (55424)
79. Resson (55426)
80. Revigny-sur-Ornain (55427)
81. Ribeaucourt (55430)
82. Robert-Espagne (55435)
83. Rumont (55446)
84. Rupt-aux-Nonains (55447)
85. Saint-Amand-sur-Ornain (55452)
86. Salmagne (55466)
87. Saudrupt (55470)
88. Savonnières-devant-Bar (55476)
89. Savonnières-en-Perthois (55477)
90. Seigneulles (55479)
91. Seuil-d'Argonne (55517)
92. Silmont (55488)
93. Sommeilles (55493)
94. Sommelonne (55494)
95. Stainville (55501)
96. Tannois (55504)
97. Trémont-sur-Saulx (55514)
98. Les Trois-Domaines (55254)
99. Tronville-en-Barrois (55519)
100. Val-d'Ornain (55366)
101. Vassincourt (55531)
102. Vaubecourt (55532)
103. Vavincourt (55541)
104. Velaines (55543)
105. Villers-aux-Vents (55560)
106. Villers-le-Sec (55562)
107. Ville-sur-Saulx (55568)
108. Villotte-devant-Louppy (55569)
109. Waly (55577)
110. Willeroncourt (55581)

== History ==
The arrondissement of Bar-le-Duc was created in 1800.

As a result of the reorganisation of the cantons of France which came into effect in 2015, the borders of the cantons are no longer related to the borders of the arrondissements. The cantons of the arrondissement of Bar-le-Duc were, as of January 2015:

1. Ancerville
2. Bar-le-Duc-Nord
3. Bar-le-Duc-Sud
4. Ligny-en-Barrois
5. Montiers-sur-Saulx
6. Revigny-sur-Ornain
7. Seuil-d'Argonne
8. Vaubecourt
9. Vavincourt
