= Tannois =

- Commune
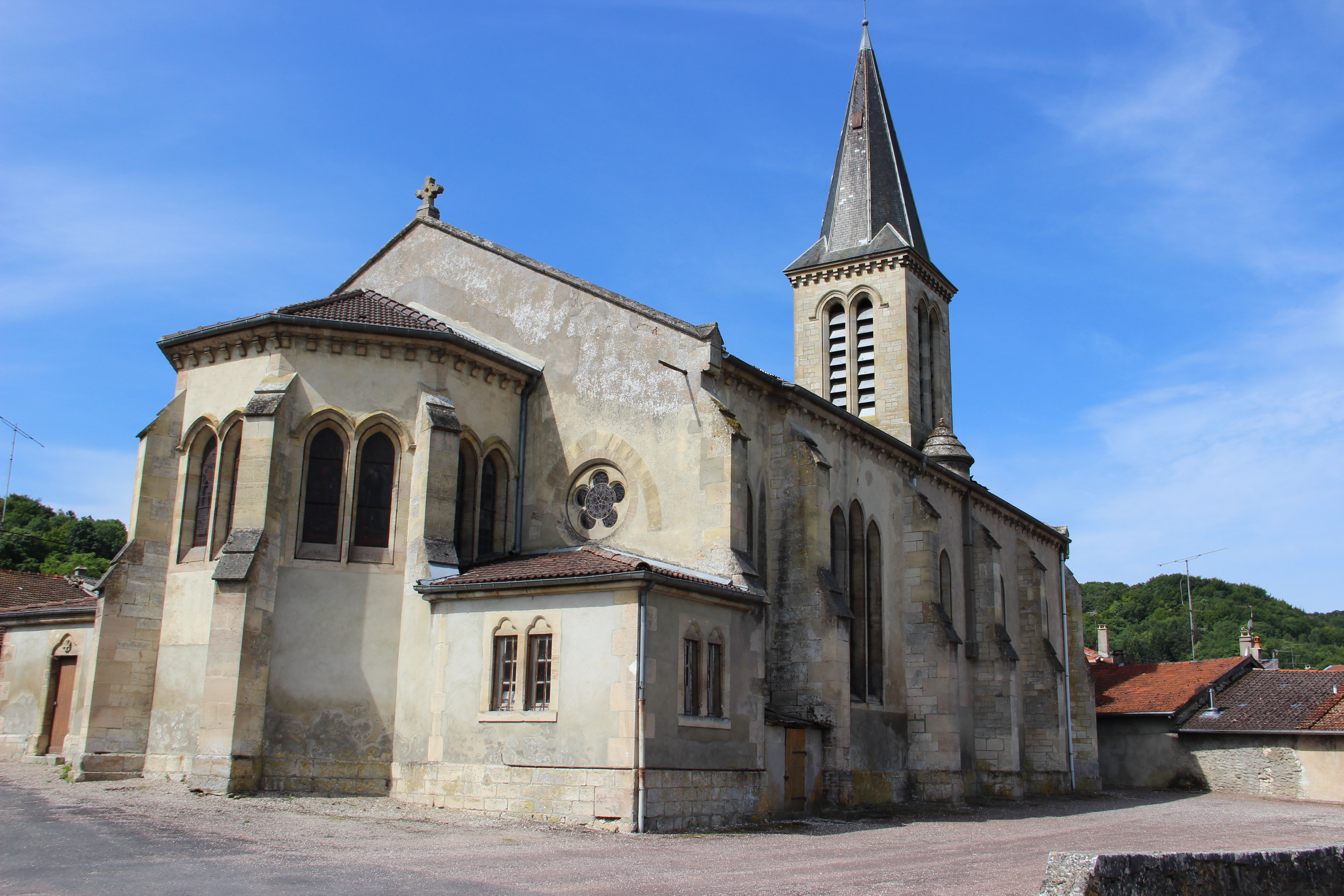
- The church in Tannois

- Coat of arms
- Location of Tannois
- Location within France Location within Grand Est
- Coordinates: 48°43′36″N 5°13′52″E
- Country: France
- Region: Grand Est
- Department: Meuse
- Arrondissement: Bar-le-Duc
- Canton: Ancerville
- Intercommunality: CA Bar-le-Duc - Sud Meuse

Government
  - Mayor (2020–2026): Marie-France Bertrand
- Area^{1}: 13.34 km^{2} (5.15 sq mi)
- Elevation: 251 m (823 ft)
- Highest elevation: 354 m (1,161 ft)
- Lowest elevation: 194 m (636 ft)
- Population (2023): 387
  - Density: 29.0/km^{2} (75.1/sq mi)
- Time zone: UTC+01:00 (CET)
  - Summer (DST): UTC+02:00 (CEST)
- INSEE/Postal code: 55504 /55000
- ^{1} French Land Register data, which excludes lakes, ponds, glaciers > 1 km^{2} (0.386 sq mi or 247 acres) and river estuaries.

Tannois (French pronunciation: [tanwa]) is a commune in the Meuse department in Grand Est in north-eastern France.

== See also ==
- Communes of the Meuse department
