= Stainville =

- Commune
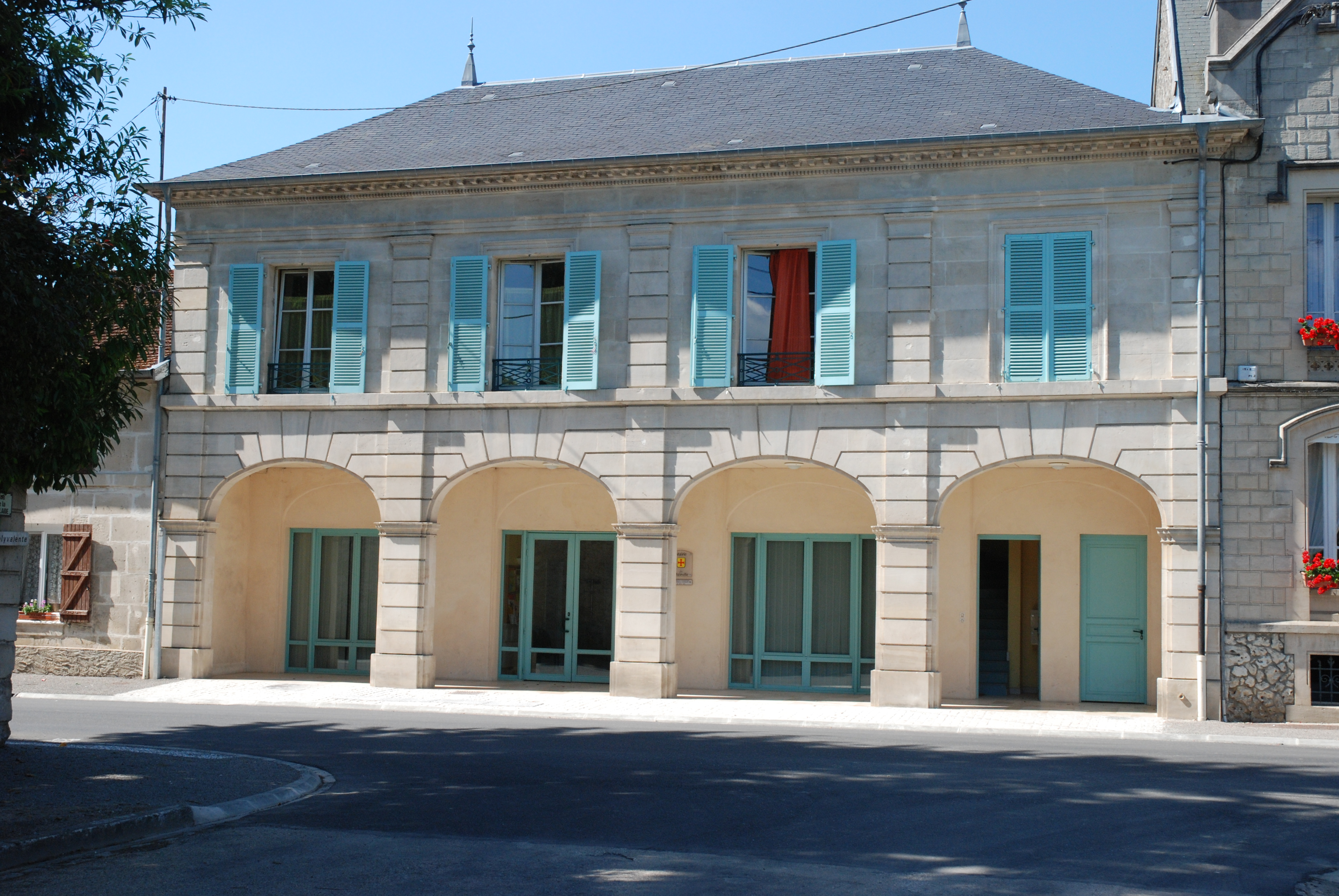
- The town hall in Stainville

- Coat of arms
- Location of Stainville
- Location within France Location within Grand Est
- Coordinates: 48°39′15″N 5°11′10″E
- Country: France
- Region: Grand Est
- Department: Meuse
- Arrondissement: Bar-le-Duc
- Canton: Ancerville
- Intercommunality: CC Portes de Meuse

Government
  - Mayor (2020–2026): Marie-Hélène Gallois
- Area^{1}: 20.87 km^{2} (8.06 sq mi)
- Elevation: 238 m (781 ft)
- Highest elevation: 321 m (1,053 ft)
- Lowest elevation: 197 m (646 ft)
- Population (2023): 373
  - Density: 17.9/km^{2} (46.3/sq mi)
- Time zone: UTC+01:00 (CET)
  - Summer (DST): UTC+02:00 (CEST)
- INSEE/Postal code: 55501 /55500
- ^{1} French Land Register data, which excludes lakes, ponds, glaciers > 1 km^{2} (0.386 sq mi or 247 acres) and river estuaries.

Stainville (French pronunciation: [stɛ̃vil]) is a commune in the Meuse department in Grand Est in north-eastern France.

== See also ==
- Communes of the Meuse department
