= Villers-aux-Vents =

- Commune
- Coat of arms
- Location of Villers-aux-Vents
- Location within France Location within Grand Est
- Coordinates: 48°51′26″N 5°01′01″E
- Country: France
- Region: Grand Est
- Department: Meuse
- Arrondissement: Bar-le-Duc
- Canton: Revigny-sur-Ornain
- Intercommunality: CC du Pays de Revigny-sur-Ornain

Government
  - Mayor (2020–2026): Sandy Savouroux
- Area^{1}: 6.14 km^{2} (2.37 sq mi)
- Elevation: 186 m (610 ft)
- Highest elevation: 193 m (633 ft)
- Lowest elevation: 150 m (490 ft)
- Population (2023): 125
  - Density: 20.4/km^{2} (52.7/sq mi)
- Time zone: UTC+01:00 (CET)
  - Summer (DST): UTC+02:00 (CEST)
- INSEE/Postal code: 55560 /55800
- ^{1} French Land Register data, which excludes lakes, ponds, glaciers > 1 km^{2} (0.386 sq mi or 247 acres) and river estuaries.

Villers-aux-Vents (French pronunciation: [vilɛʁ o vɑ̃]) is a commune in the Meuse department in Grand Est in north-eastern France.

== See also ==
- Communes of the Meuse department
