= Communes of the Meuse department =

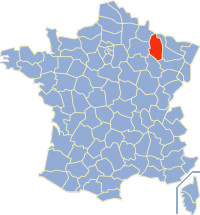

The following is a list of the 499 communes of the Meuse department of France.

The communes cooperate in the following intercommunalities (as of 2025):

- Communauté d'agglomération de Bar-le-Duc - Sud Meuse
- Communauté d'agglomération du Grand Verdun
- Communauté de communes de l'Aire à l'Argonne
- Communauté de communes Argonne-Meuse
- Communauté de communes Cœur du Pays-Haut (partly)
- Communauté de communes de Commercy - Void - Vaucouleurs
- Communauté de communes Côtes de Meuse - Woëvre
- Communauté de communes de Damvillers Spincourt
- Communauté de communes du Pays d'Étain
- Communauté de communes du Pays de Montmédy
- Communauté de communes du Pays de Revigny-sur-Ornain
- Communauté de communes du Pays de Stenay et du Val Dunois
- Communauté de communes des Portes de Meuse
- Communauté de communes du Sammiellois
- Communauté de communes du Territoire de Fresnes-en-Woëvre
- Communauté de communes Val de Meuse - Voie Sacrée

| INSEE code | Postal code | Commune |
|---|---|---|
| 55001 | 55130 | Abainville |
| 55002 | 55400 | Abaucourt-Hautecourt |
| 55004 | 55110 | Aincreville |
| 55005 | 55130 | Amanty |
| 55007 | 55300 | Ambly-sur-Meuse |
| 55008 | 55230 | Amel-sur-l'Étang |
| 55009 | 55320 | Ancemont |
| 55010 | 55170 | Ancerville |
| 55011 | 55800 | Andernay |
| 55012 | 55300 | Apremont-la-Forêt |
| 55013 | 55230 | Arrancy-sur-Crusnes |
| 55014 | 55120 | Aubréville |
| 55015 | 55170 | Aulnois-en-Perthois |
| 55017 | 55120 | Autrécourt-sur-Aire |
| 55018 | 55700 | Autréville-Saint-Lambert |
| 55021 | 55210 | Avillers-Sainte-Croix |
| 55022 | 55600 | Avioth |
| 55023 | 55270 | Avocourt |
| 55024 | 55150 | Azannes-et-Soumazannes |
| 55025 | 55700 | Baâlon |
| 55026 | 55130 | Badonvilliers-Gérauvilliers |
| 55027 | 55300 | Bannoncourt |
| 55028 | 55110 | Bantheville |
| 55029 | 55000 | Bar-le-Duc |
| 55031 | 55170 | Baudonvilliers |
| 55032 | 55260 | Baudrémont |
| 55033 | 55270 | Baulny |
| 55034 | 55600 | Bazeilles-sur-Othain |
| 55035 | 55170 | Bazincourt-sur-Saulx |
| 55036 | 55700 | Beauclair |
| 55037 | 55700 | Beaufort-en-Argonne |
| 55038 | 55250 | Beaulieu-en-Argonne |
| 55039 | 55100 | Beaumont-en-Verdunois |
| 55040 | 55250 | Beausite |
| 55041 | 55000 | Behonne |
| 55042 | 55100 | Belleray |
| 55043 | 55430 | Belleville-sur-Meuse |
| 55044 | 55260 | Belrain |
| 55045 | 55100 | Belrupt-en-Verdunois |
| 55046 | 55210 | Beney-en-Woëvre |
| 55047 | 55100 | Béthelainville |
| 55048 | 55270 | Béthincourt |
| 55049 | 55000 | Beurey-sur-Saulx |
| 55050 | 55100 | Bezonvaux |
| 55051 | 55290 | Biencourt-sur-Orge |
| 55053 | 55230 | Billy-sous-Mangiennes |
| 55054 | 55300 | Bislée |
| 55055 | 55400 | Blanzée |
| 55057 | 55400 | Boinville-en-Woëvre |
| 55058 | 55200 | Boncourt-sur-Meuse |
| 55059 | 55130 | Bonnet |
| 55060 | 55160 | Bonzée |
| 55061 | 55500 | Le Bouchon-sur-Saulx |
| 55062 | 55300 | Bouconville-sur-Madt |
| 55063 | 55240 | Bouligny |
| 55064 | 55300 | Bouquemont |
| 55065 | 55270 | Boureuilles |
| 55066 | 55190 | Bovée-sur-Barboure |
| 55067 | 55500 | Boviolles |
| 55068 | 55120 | Brabant-en-Argonne |
| 55069 | 55800 | Brabant-le-Roi |
| 55070 | 55100 | Brabant-sur-Meuse |
| 55071 | 55150 | Brandeville |
| 55072 | 55400 | Braquis |
| 55073 | 55100 | Bras-sur-Meuse |
| 55075 | 55170 | Brauvilliers |
| 55076 | 55150 | Bréhéville |
| 55077 | 55600 | Breux |
| 55078 | 55110 | Brieulles-sur-Meuse |
| 55079 | 55000 | Brillon-en-Barrois |
| 55080 | 55140 | Brixey-aux-Chanoines |
| 55081 | 55250 | Brizeaux |
| 55082 | 55120 | Brocourt-en-Argonne |
| 55083 | 55700 | Brouennes |
| 55084 | 55190 | Broussey-en-Blois |
| 55085 | 55200 | Broussey-Raulecourt |
| 55087 | 55290 | Bure |
| 55088 | 55140 | Burey-en-Vaux |
| 55089 | 55140 | Burey-la-Côte |
| 55093 | 55300 | Buxières-sous-les-Côtes |
| 55094 | 55400 | Buzy-Darmont |
| 55095 | 55700 | Cesse |
| 55096 | 55210 | Chaillon |
| 55097 | 55140 | Chalaines |
| 55099 | 55100 | Champneuville |
| 55100 | 55140 | Champougny |
| 55358 | 55500 | Chanteraine |
| 55101 | 55000 | Chardogne |
| 55102 | 55100 | Charny-sur-Meuse |
| 55103 | 55270 | Charpentry |
| 55104 | 55130 | Chassey-Beaupré |
| 55105 | 55400 | Châtillon-sous-les-Côtes |
| 55106 | 55100 | Chattancourt |
| 55107 | 55150 | Chaumont-devant-Damvillers |
| 55108 | 55260 | Chaumont-sur-Aire |
| 55109 | 55600 | Chauvency-le-Château |
| 55110 | 55600 | Chauvency-Saint-Hubert |
| 55111 | 55300 | Chauvoncourt |
| 55113 | 55270 | Cheppy |
| 55114 | 55200 | Chonville-Malaumont |
| 55115 | 55270 | Cierges-sous-Montfaucon |
| 55116 | 55120 | Le Claon |
| 55117 | 55120 | Clermont-en-Argonne |
| 55118 | 55110 | Cléry-le-Grand |
| 55119 | 55110 | Cléry-le-Petit |
| 55120 | 55000 | Combles-en-Barrois |
| 55121 | 55160 | Combres-sous-les-Côtes |
| 55122 | 55200 | Commercy |
| 55124 | 55110 | Consenvoye |
| 55125 | 55800 | Contrisson |
| 55127 | 55260 | Courcelles-en-Barrois |
| 55128 | 55260 | Courcelles-sur-Aire |
| 55129 | 55260 | Courouvre |
| 55132 | 55170 | Cousances-les-Forges |
| 55518 | 55500 | Cousances-lès-Triconville |
| 55133 | 55290 | Couvertpuis |
| 55134 | 55800 | Couvonges |
| 55137 | 55270 | Cuisy |
| 55138 | 55000 | Culey |
| 55139 | 55100 | Cumières-le-Mort-Homme |
| 55140 | 55110 | Cunel |
| 55141 | 55500 | Dagonville |
| 55142 | 55130 | Dainville-Bertheléville |
| 55143 | 55400 | Damloup |
| 55144 | 55500 | Dammarie-sur-Saulx |
| 55145 | 55150 | Damvillers |
| 55146 | 55110 | Dannevoux |
| 55148 | 55130 | Delouze-Rosières |
| 55149 | 55150 | Delut |
| 55150 | 55130 | Demange-Baudignécourt |
| 55153 | 55400 | Dieppe-sous-Douaumont |
| 55154 | 55320 | Dieue-sur-Meuse |
| 55155 | 55120 | Dombasle-en-Argonne |
| 55156 | 55150 | Dombras |
| 55157 | 55160 | Dommartin-la-Montagne |
| 55158 | 55240 | Dommary-Baroncourt |
| 55159 | 55300 | Dompcevrin |
| 55160 | 55300 | Dompierre-aux-Bois |
| 55162 | 55240 | Domremy-la-Canne |
| 55163 | 55160 | Doncourt-aux-Templiers |
| 55537 | 55400 | Douaumont-Vaux |
| 55165 | 55110 | Doulcon |
| 55166 | 55100 | Dugny-sur-Meuse |
| 55167 | 55110 | Dun-sur-Meuse |
| 55168 | 55230 | Duzey |
| 55169 | 55600 | Écouviez |
| 55170 | 55150 | Écurey-en-Verdunois |
| 55171 | 55400 | Eix |
| 55172 | 55160 | Les Éparges |
| 55173 | 55140 | Épiez-sur-Meuse |
| 55174 | 55270 | Épinonville |
| 55175 | 55260 | Érize-la-Brûlée |
| 55177 | 55260 | Érize-la-Petite |
| 55178 | 55000 | Érize-Saint-Dizier |
| 55179 | 55500 | Erneville-aux-Bois |
| 55180 | 55100 | Esnes-en-Argonne |
| 55181 | 55400 | Étain |
| 55182 | 55240 | Éton |
| 55183 | 55150 | Étraye |
| 55184 | 55200 | Euville |
| 55185 | 55250 | Èvres |
| 55186 | 55000 | Fains-Véel |
| 55188 | 55600 | Flassigny |
| 55189 | 55100 | Fleury-devant-Douaumont |
| 55191 | 55400 | Foameix-Ornel |
| 55192 | 55110 | Fontaines-Saint-Clair |
| 55193 | 55110 | Forges-sur-Meuse |
| 55194 | 55250 | Foucaucourt-sur-Thabas |
| 55195 | 55500 | Fouchères-aux-Bois |
| 55196 | 55200 | Frémeréville-sous-les-Côtes |
| 55197 | 55260 | Fresnes-au-Mont |
| 55198 | 55160 | Fresnes-en-Woëvre |
| 55199 | 55120 | Froidos |
| 55200 | 55100 | Fromeréville-les-Vallons |
| 55201 | 55400 | Fromezey |
| 55202 | 55120 | Futeau |
| 55204 | 55320 | Génicourt-sur-Meuse |
| 55206 | 55110 | Gercourt-et-Drillancourt |
| 55207 | 55000 | Géry |
| 55208 | 55110 | Gesnes-en-Argonne |
| 55258 | 55200 | Geville |
| 55210 | 55260 | Gimécourt |
| 55211 | 55400 | Gincrey |
| 55212 | 55200 | Girauvoisin |
| 55214 | 55500 | Givrauval |
| 55215 | 55130 | Gondrecourt-le-Château |
| 55216 | 55230 | Gouraincourt |
| 55217 | 55140 | Goussaincourt |
| 55218 | 55150 | Gremilly |
| 55219 | 55400 | Grimaucourt-en-Woëvre |
| 55220 | 55500 | Grimaucourt-près-Sampigny |
| 55221 | 55000 | Guerpont |
| 55222 | 55400 | Gussainville |
| 55224 | 55000 | Haironville |
| 55225 | 55700 | Halles-sous-les-Côtes |
| 55226 | 55600 | Han-lès-Juvigny |
| 55228 | 55210 | Hannonville-sous-les-Côtes |
| 55229 | 55300 | Han-sur-Meuse |
| 55232 | 55160 | Harville |
| 55236 | 55100 | Haudainville |
| 55237 | 55160 | Haudiomont |
| 55239 | 55100 | Haumont-près-Samogneux |
| 55123 | 55000 | Les Hauts-de-Chée |
| 55241 | 55220 | Heippes |
| 55242 | 55160 | Hennemont |
| 55243 | 55210 | Herbeuville |
| 55244 | 55400 | Herméville-en-Woëvre |
| 55245 | 55210 | Heudicourt-sous-les-Côtes |
| 55246 | 55290 | Hévilliers |
| 55247 | 55130 | Horville-en-Ornois |
| 55248 | 55130 | Houdelaincourt |
| 55250 | 55700 | Inor |
| 55251 | 55220 | Ippécourt |
| 55252 | 55600 | Iré-le-Sec |
| 55296 | 55000 | L'Isle-en-Rigault |
| 55253 | 55120 | Les Islettes |
| 55255 | 55600 | Jametz |
| 55256 | 55160 | Jonville-en-Woëvre |
| 55257 | 55120 | Jouy-en-Argonne |
| 55260 | 55120 | Julvécourt |
| 55261 | 55170 | Juvigny-en-Perthois |
| 55262 | 55600 | Juvigny-sur-Loison |
| 55263 | 55300 | Kœur-la-Grande |
| 55264 | 55300 | Kœur-la-Petite |
| 55265 | 55160 | Labeuville |
| 55266 | 55120 | Lachalade |
| 55267 | 55210 | Lachaussée |
| 55268 | 55300 | Lacroix-sur-Meuse |
| 55269 | 55260 | Lahaymeix |
| 55270 | 55300 | Lahayville |
| 55271 | 55800 | Laheycourt |
| 55272 | 55800 | Laimont |
| 55274 | 55300 | Lamorville |
| 55275 | 55700 | Lamouilly |
| 55276 | 55100 | Landrecourt-Lempire |
| 55278 | 55190 | Laneuville-au-Rupt |
| 55279 | 55700 | Laneuville-sur-Meuse |
| 55280 | 55400 | Lanhères |
| 55281 | 55160 | Latour-en-Woëvre |
| 55282 | 55260 | Lavallée |
| 55284 | 55170 | Lavincourt |
| 55285 | 55120 | Lavoye |
| 55286 | 55220 | Lemmes |
| 55288 | 55200 | Lérouville |
| 55289 | 55260 | Levoncourt |
| 55290 | 55260 | Lignières-sur-Aire |
| 55291 | 55500 | Ligny-en-Barrois |
| 55292 | 55110 | Liny-devant-Dun |
| 55293 | 55110 | Lion-devant-Dun |

| INSEE code | Postal code | Commune |
|---|---|---|
| 55295 | 55250 | Lisle-en-Barrois |
| 55297 | 55150 | Lissey |
| 55298 | 55000 | Loisey |
| 55299 | 55230 | Loison |
| 55301 | 55260 | Longchamps-sur-Aire |
| 55300 | 55500 | Longeaux |
| 55302 | 55000 | Longeville-en-Barrois |
| 55303 | 55300 | Loupmont |
| 55304 | 55800 | Louppy-le-Château |
| 55306 | 55600 | Louppy-sur-Loison |
| 55307 | 55100 | Louvemont-Côte-du-Poivre |
| 55310 | 55700 | Luzy-Saint-Martin |
| 55311 | 55160 | Maizeray |
| 55312 | 55300 | Maizey |
| 55313 | 55270 | Malancourt |
| 55315 | 55290 | Mandres-en-Barrois |
| 55316 | 55150 | Mangiennes |
| 55317 | 55160 | Manheulles |
| 55320 | 55160 | Marchéville-en-Woëvre |
| 55321 | 55100 | Marre |
| 55322 | 55190 | Marson-sur-Barboure |
| 55323 | 55700 | Martincourt-sur-Meuse |
| 55324 | 55600 | Marville |
| 55325 | 55400 | Maucourt-sur-Orne |
| 55326 | 55500 | Maulan |
| 55327 | 55190 | Mauvages |
| 55328 | 55140 | Maxey-sur-Vaise |
| 55329 | 55300 | Mécrin |
| 55330 | 55190 | Méligny-le-Grand |
| 55331 | 55190 | Méligny-le-Petit |
| 55332 | 55500 | Menaucourt |
| 55333 | 55260 | Ménil-aux-Bois |
| 55334 | 55190 | Ménil-la-Horgne |
| 55335 | 55500 | Ménil-sur-Saulx |
| 55336 | 55150 | Merles-sur-Loison |
| 55338 | 55110 | Milly-sur-Bradon |
| 55339 | 55400 | Mogeville |
| 55340 | 55800 | Mognéville |
| 55341 | 55150 | Moirey-Flabas-Crépion |
| 55343 | 55270 | Montblainville |
| 55344 | 55140 | Montbras |
| 55345 | 55110 | Mont-devant-Sassey |
| 55346 | 55270 | Montfaucon-d'Argonne |
| 55347 | 55320 | Les Monthairons |
| 55348 | 55290 | Montiers-sur-Saulx |
| 55349 | 55110 | Montigny-devant-Sassey |
| 55350 | 55140 | Montigny-lès-Vaucouleurs |
| 55351 | 55600 | Montmédy |
| 55352 | 55000 | Montplonne |
| 55353 | 55300 | Montsec |
| 55355 | 55100 | Montzéville |
| 55356 | 55400 | Moranville |
| 55357 | 55400 | Morgemoulin |
| 55359 | 55290 | Morley |
| 55360 | 55320 | Mouilly |
| 55361 | 55400 | Moulainville |
| 55362 | 55700 | Moulins-Saint-Hubert |
| 55363 | 55160 | Moulotte |
| 55364 | 55700 | Mouzay |
| 55365 | 55110 | Murvaux |
| 55367 | 55230 | Muzeray |
| 55368 | 55190 | Naives-en-Blois |
| 55369 | 55000 | Naives-Rosières |
| 55370 | 55500 | Naix-aux-Forges |
| 55371 | 55500 | Nançois-le-Grand |
| 55372 | 55500 | Nançois-sur-Ornain |
| 55375 | 55270 | Nantillois |
| 55373 | 55500 | Nant-le-Grand |
| 55374 | 55500 | Nant-le-Petit |
| 55376 | 55500 | Nantois |
| 55377 | 55700 | Nepvant |
| 55378 | 55800 | Nettancourt |
| 55379 | 55120 | Le Neufour |
| 55380 | 55260 | Neuville-en-Verdunois |
| 55381 | 55140 | Neuville-lès-Vaucouleurs |
| 55382 | 55800 | Neuville-sur-Ornain |
| 55383 | 55120 | Neuvilly-en-Argonne |
| 55384 | 55260 | Nicey-sur-Aire |
| 55385 | 55120 | Nixéville-Blercourt |
| 55386 | 55210 | Nonsard-Lamarche |
| 55387 | 55230 | Nouillonpont |
| 55388 | 55800 | Noyers-Auzécourt |
| 55389 | 55250 | Nubécourt |
| 55391 | 55700 | Olizy-sur-Chiers |
| 55394 | 55150 | Ornes |
| 55395 | 55220 | Osches |
| 55396 | 55190 | Ourches-sur-Meuse |
| 55397 | 55140 | Pagny-la-Blanche-Côte |
| 55398 | 55190 | Pagny-sur-Meuse |
| 55399 | 55160 | Pareid |
| 55400 | 55400 | Parfondrupt |
| 55401 | 55300 | Les Paroches |
| 55403 | 55150 | Peuvillers |
| 55404 | 55260 | Pierrefitte-sur-Aire |
| 55405 | 55230 | Pillon |
| 55406 | 55160 | Pintheville |
| 55407 | 55200 | Pont-sur-Meuse |
| 55408 | 55700 | Pouilly-sur-Meuse |
| 55409 | 55250 | Pretz-en-Argonne |
| 55410 | 55600 | Quincy-Landzécourt |
| 55442 | 55260 | Raival |
| 55411 | 55220 | Rambluzin-et-Benoite-Vaux |
| 55412 | 55300 | Rambucourt |
| 55414 | 55800 | Rancourt-sur-Ornain |
| 55415 | 55300 | Ranzières |
| 55416 | 55120 | Rarécourt |
| 55419 | 55120 | Récicourt |
| 55420 | 55220 | Récourt-le-Creux |
| 55421 | 55190 | Reffroy |
| 55422 | 55110 | Regnéville-sur-Meuse |
| 55423 | 55250 | Rembercourt-Sommaisne |
| 55424 | 55800 | Remennecourt |
| 55425 | 55600 | Remoiville |
| 55426 | 55000 | Resson |
| 55427 | 55800 | Revigny-sur-Ornain |
| 55428 | 55150 | Réville-aux-Bois |
| 55429 | 55160 | Riaville |
| 55430 | 55290 | Ribeaucourt |
| 55431 | 55300 | Richecourt |
| 55433 | 55140 | Rigny-la-Salle |
| 55434 | 55140 | Rigny-Saint-Martin |
| 55435 | 55000 | Robert-Espagne |
| 55436 | 55130 | Les Roises |
| 55437 | 55150 | Romagne-sous-les-Côtes |
| 55438 | 55110 | Romagne-sous-Montfaucon |
| 55439 | 55160 | Ronvaux |
| 55443 | 55400 | Rouvres-en-Woëvre |
| 55444 | 55300 | Rouvrois-sur-Meuse |
| 55445 | 55230 | Rouvrois-sur-Othain |
| 55446 | 55000 | Rumont |
| 55447 | 55170 | Rupt-aux-Nonains |
| 55448 | 55260 | Rupt-devant-Saint-Mihiel |
| 55449 | 55320 | Rupt-en-Woëvre |
| 55450 | 55150 | Rupt-sur-Othain |
| 55452 | 55500 | Saint-Amand-sur-Ornain |
| 55453 | 55220 | Saint-André-en-Barrois |
| 55454 | 55500 | Saint-Aubin-sur-Aire |
| 55456 | 55140 | Saint-Germain-sur-Meuse |
| 55457 | 55160 | Saint-Hilaire-en-Woëvre |
| 55458 | 55400 | Saint-Jean-lès-Buzy |
| 55459 | 55130 | Saint-Joire |
| 55460 | 55200 | Saint-Julien-sous-les-Côtes |
| 55461 | 55150 | Saint-Laurent-sur-Othain |
| 55462 | 55210 | Saint-Maurice-sous-les-Côtes |
| 55463 | 55300 | Saint-Mihiel |
| 55464 | 55230 | Saint-Pierrevillers |
| 55465 | 55160 | Saint-Remy-la-Calonne |
| 55466 | 55000 | Salmagne |
| 55468 | 55100 | Samogneux |
| 55467 | 55300 | Sampigny |
| 55469 | 55110 | Sassey-sur-Meuse |
| 55470 | 55000 | Saudrupt |
| 55471 | 55110 | Saulmory-Villefranche |
| 55472 | 55500 | Saulvaux |
| 55473 | 55160 | Saulx-lès-Champlon |
| 55474 | 55140 | Sauvigny |
| 55475 | 55190 | Sauvoy |
| 55476 | 55000 | Savonnières-devant-Bar |
| 55477 | 55170 | Savonnières-en-Perthois |
| 55479 | 55000 | Seigneulles |
| 55481 | 55230 | Senon |
| 55482 | 55220 | Senoncourt-lès-Maujouy |
| 55484 | 55270 | Septsarges |
| 55485 | 55140 | Sepvigny |
| 55517 | 55250 | Seuil-d'Argonne |
| 55487 | 55300 | Seuzey |
| 55488 | 55000 | Silmont |
| 55489 | 55100 | Sivry-la-Perche |
| 55490 | 55110 | Sivry-sur-Meuse |
| 55492 | 55320 | Sommedieue |
| 55493 | 55800 | Sommeilles |
| 55494 | 55170 | Sommelonne |
| 55495 | 55230 | Sorbey |
| 55496 | 55190 | Sorcy-Saint-Martin |
| 55497 | 55220 | Les Souhesmes-Rampont |
| 55498 | 55220 | Souilly |
| 55500 | 55230 | Spincourt |
| 55501 | 55500 | Stainville |
| 55502 | 55700 | Stenay |
| 55503 | 55140 | Taillancourt |
| 55504 | 55000 | Tannois |
| 55505 | 55840 | Thierville-sur-Meuse |
| 55506 | 55260 | Thillombois |
| 55507 | 55210 | Thillot |
| 55508 | 55600 | Thonne-la-Long |
| 55510 | 55600 | Thonne-les-Près |
| 55509 | 55600 | Thonne-le-Thil |
| 55511 | 55600 | Thonnelle |
| 55512 | 55220 | Tilly-sur-Meuse |
| 55514 | 55000 | Trémont-sur-Saulx |
| 55515 | 55160 | Trésauvaux |
| 55516 | 55130 | Tréveray |
| 55254 | 55220 | Les Trois-Domaines |
| 55519 | 55310 | Tronville-en-Barrois |
| 55520 | 55190 | Troussey |
| 55521 | 55300 | Troyon |
| 55522 | 55140 | Ugny-sur-Meuse |
| 55523 | 55100 | Vacherauville |
| 55525 | 55220 | Vadelaincourt |
| 55526 | 55200 | Vadonville |
| 55530 | 55300 | Valbois |
| 55366 | 55000 | Val-d'Ornain |
| 55527 | 55270 | Varennes-en-Argonne |
| 55528 | 55300 | Varnéville |
| 55531 | 55800 | Vassincourt |
| 55532 | 55250 | Vaubecourt |
| 55533 | 55140 | Vaucouleurs |
| 55534 | 55130 | Vaudeville-le-Haut |
| 55535 | 55230 | Vaudoncourt |
| 55536 | 55270 | Vauquois |
| 55540 | 55300 | Vaux-lès-Palameix |
| 55541 | 55000 | Vavincourt |
| 55543 | 55500 | Velaines |
| 55544 | 55600 | Velosnes |
| 55545 | 55100 | Verdun |
| 55546 | 55600 | Verneuil-Grand |
| 55547 | 55600 | Verneuil-Petit |
| 55549 | 55270 | Véry |
| 55551 | 55210 | Vigneulles-lès-Hattonchâtel |
| 55552 | 55600 | Vigneul-sous-Montmédy |
| 55553 | 55200 | Vignot |
| 55554 | 55600 | Villécloye |
| 55555 | 55260 | Ville-devant-Belrain |
| 55556 | 55150 | Ville-devant-Chaumont |
| 55557 | 55160 | Ville-en-Woëvre |
| 55559 | 55190 | Villeroy-sur-Méholle |
| 55560 | 55800 | Villers-aux-Vents |
| 55561 | 55110 | Villers-devant-Dun |
| 55562 | 55500 | Villers-le-Sec |
| 55563 | 55150 | Villers-lès-Mangiennes |
| 55565 | 55160 | Villers-sous-Pareid |
| 55566 | 55220 | Villers-sur-Meuse |
| 55567 | 55120 | Ville-sur-Cousances |
| 55568 | 55000 | Ville-sur-Saulx |
| 55569 | 55250 | Villotte-devant-Louppy |
| 55570 | 55260 | Villotte-sur-Aire |
| 55571 | 55110 | Vilosnes-Haraumont |
| 55572 | 55150 | Vittarville |
| 55573 | 55190 | Void-Vacon |
| 55574 | 55130 | Vouthon-Bas |
| 55575 | 55130 | Vouthon-Haut |
| 55577 | 55250 | Waly |
| 55578 | 55400 | Warcq |
| 55579 | 55160 | Watronville |
| 55580 | 55150 | Wavrille |
| 55581 | 55500 | Willeroncourt |
| 55582 | 55700 | Wiseppe |
| 55583 | 55210 | Woël |
| 55584 | 55300 | Woimbey |
| 55586 | 55300 | Xivray-et-Marvoisin |
