= Saudrupt =

- Commune
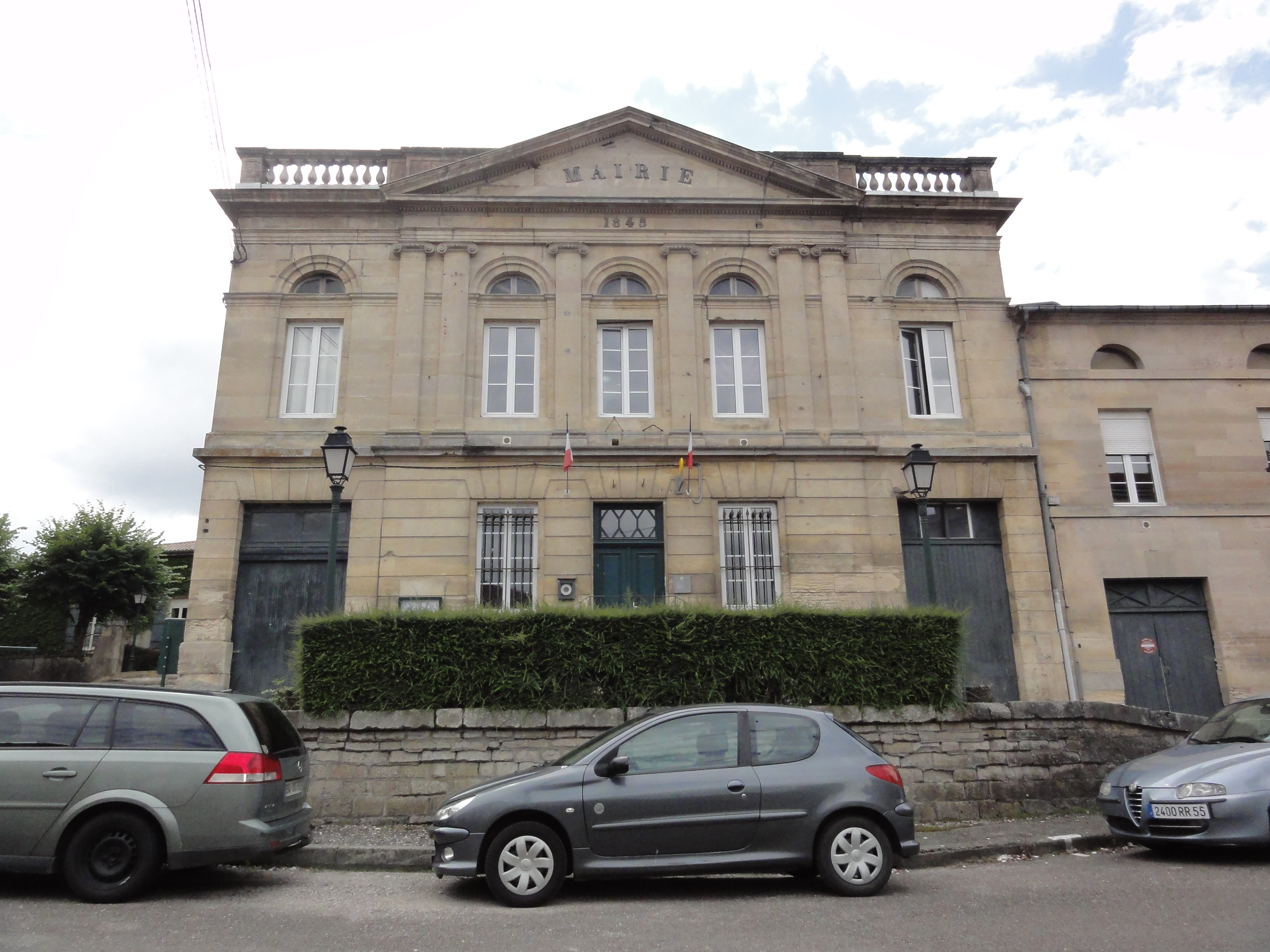
- The town hall in Saudrupt

- Coat of arms
- Location of Saudrupt
- Location within France Location within Grand Est
- Coordinates: 48°42′01″N 5°04′06″E
- Country: France
- Region: Grand Est
- Department: Meuse
- Arrondissement: Bar-le-Duc
- Canton: Ancerville
- Intercommunality: CC Portes de Meuse

Government
  - Mayor (2020–2026): Thierry Larcelet
- Area^{1}: 7.78 km^{2} (3.00 sq mi)
- Elevation: 200 m (660 ft)
- Highest elevation: 246 m (807 ft)
- Lowest elevation: 172 m (564 ft)
- Population (2023): 190
  - Density: 24/km^{2} (63/sq mi)
- Demonym: Saudrois(e)
- Time zone: UTC+01:00 (CET)
  - Summer (DST): UTC+02:00 (CEST)
- INSEE/Postal code: 55470 /55000
- ^{1} French Land Register data, which excludes lakes, ponds, glaciers > 1 km^{2} (0.386 sq mi or 247 acres) and river estuaries.

Saudrupt (French pronunciation: [sodʁy]) is a commune in the Meuse department in Grand Est in north-eastern France.

== See also ==
- Communes of the Meuse department
