= Bazincourt-sur-Saulx =

- Commune
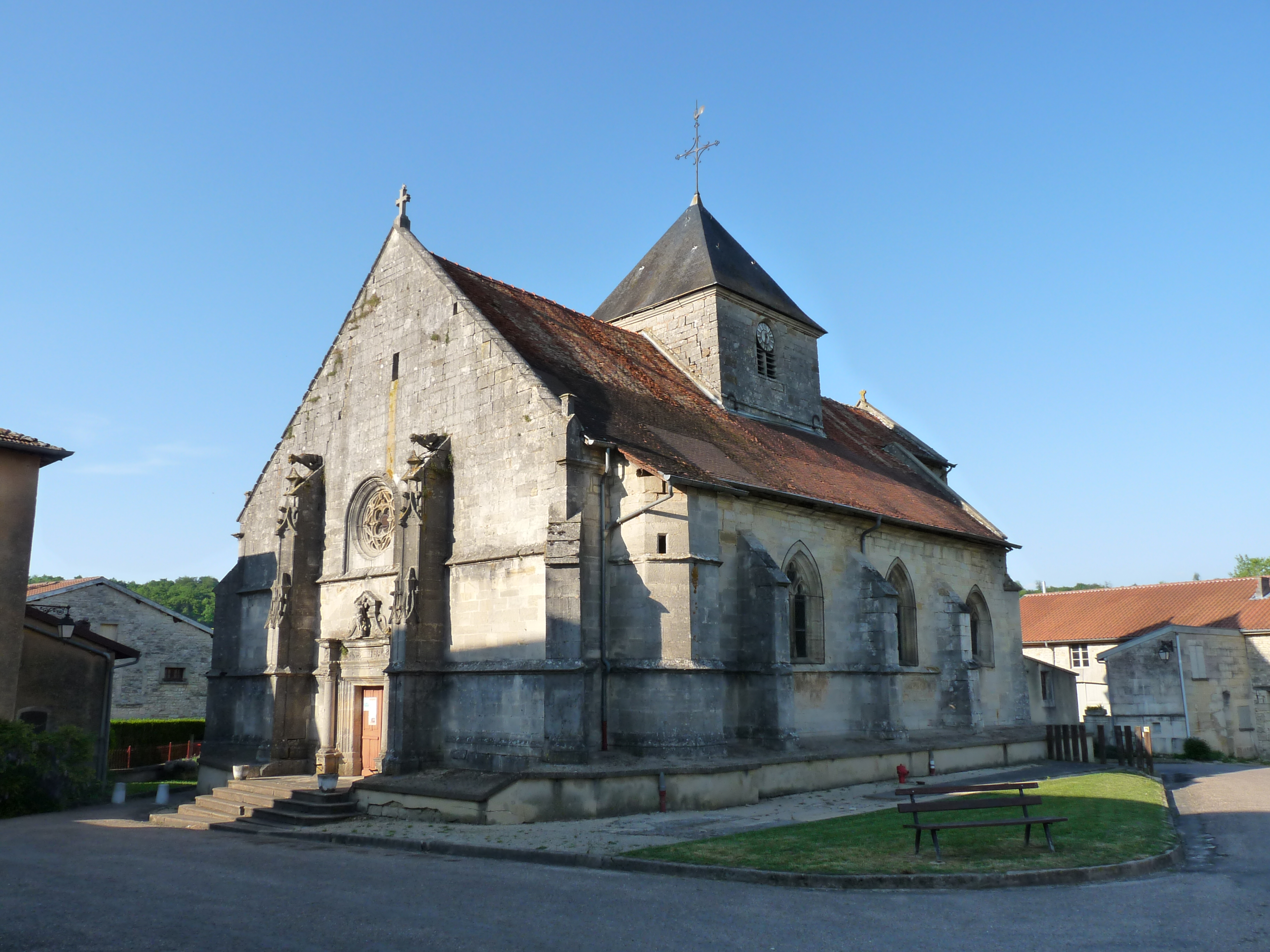
- The church in Bazincourt-sur-Saulx

- Coat of arms
- Location of Bazincourt-sur-Saulx
- Location within France Location within Grand Est
- Coordinates: 48°40′36″N 5°08′23″E
- Country: France
- Region: Grand Est
- Department: Meuse
- Arrondissement: Bar-le-Duc
- Canton: Ancerville

Government
  - Mayor (2020–2026): Francis Colin
- Area^{1}: 10.34 km^{2} (3.99 sq mi)
- Elevation: 205 m (673 ft)
- Highest elevation: 302 m (991 ft)
- Lowest elevation: 183 m (600 ft)
- Population (2023): 141
  - Density: 13.6/km^{2} (35.3/sq mi)
- Time zone: UTC+01:00 (CET)
  - Summer (DST): UTC+02:00 (CEST)
- INSEE/Postal code: 55035 /55170
- ^{1} French Land Register data, which excludes lakes, ponds, glaciers > 1 km^{2} (0.386 sq mi or 247 acres) and river estuaries.

Bazincourt-sur-Saulx (French pronunciation: [bazɛ̃kuʁ syʁ so], literally Bazincourt on Saulx) is a commune in the Meuse department in the Grand Est region in northeastern France.

== Population ==
Historical population
Year	Pop.	±% p.a.
1968	187	—
1975	133	−4.75%
1982	121	−1.34%
1990	177	+4.87%
1999	166	−0.71%
2007	148	−1.42%
2012	149	+0.13%
2017	147	−0.27%
2023	141	−0.69%
Source: INSEE

== See also ==
- Communes of the Meuse department
