= Silmont =

- Commune
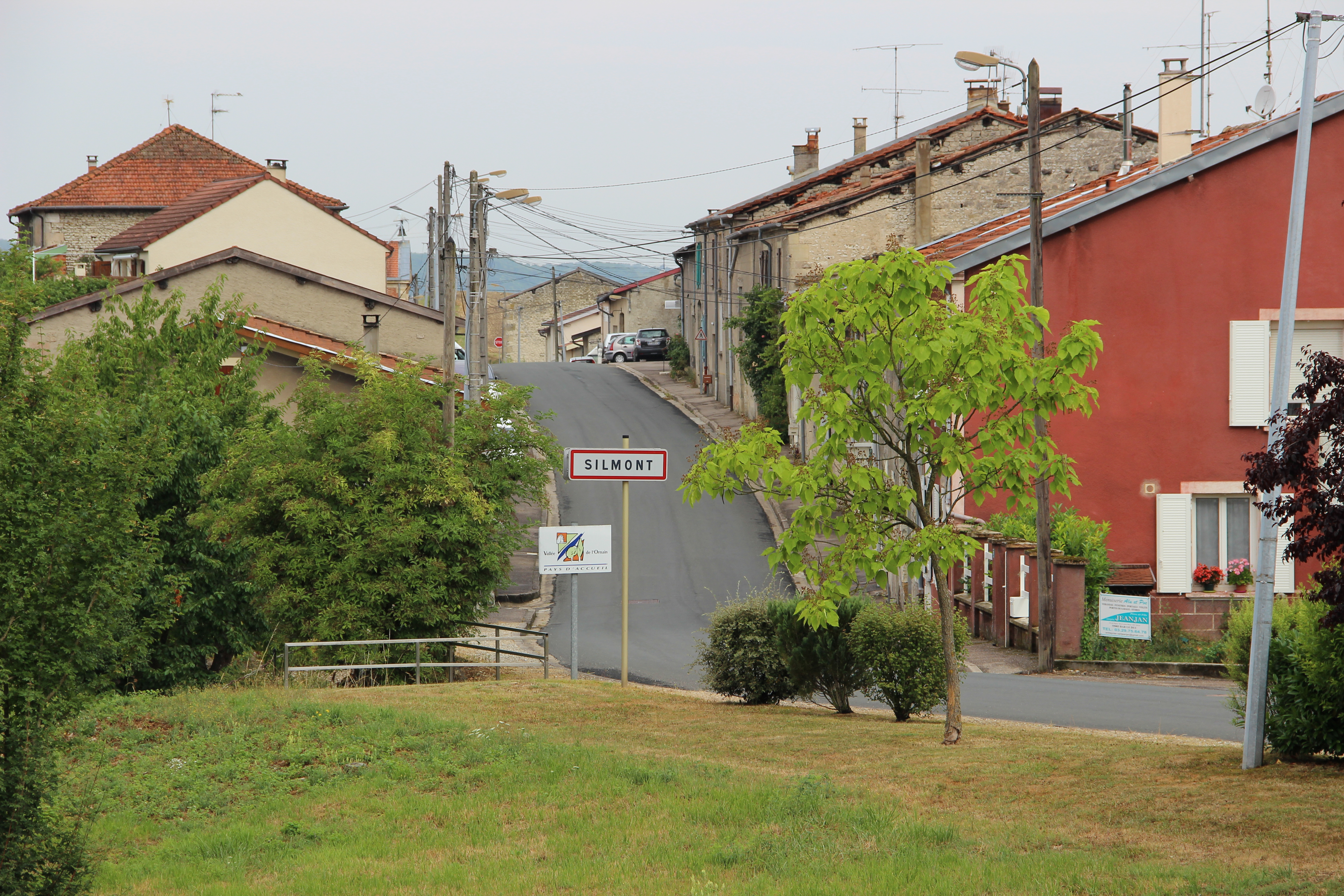
- The road into Silmont

- Coat of arms
- Location of Silmont
- Location within France Location within Grand Est
- Coordinates: 48°44′08″N 5°14′49″E
- Country: France
- Region: Grand Est
- Department: Meuse
- Arrondissement: Bar-le-Duc
- Canton: Ancerville
- Intercommunality: CA Bar-le-Duc - Sud Meuse

Government
  - Mayor (2020–2026): Michel Riebel
- Area^{1}: 3.83 km^{2} (1.48 sq mi)
- Elevation: 212 m (696 ft)
- Highest elevation: 338 m (1,109 ft)
- Lowest elevation: 196 m (643 ft)
- Population (2023): 141
  - Density: 36.8/km^{2} (95.3/sq mi)
- Time zone: UTC+01:00 (CET)
  - Summer (DST): UTC+02:00 (CEST)
- INSEE/Postal code: 55488 /55000
- ^{1} French Land Register data, which excludes lakes, ponds, glaciers > 1 km^{2} (0.386 sq mi or 247 acres) and river estuaries.

Silmont (French pronunciation: [silmɔ̃]) is a commune in the Meuse department in Grand Est in north-eastern France.

== See also ==
- Communes of the Meuse department
