= Guerpont =

- Commune
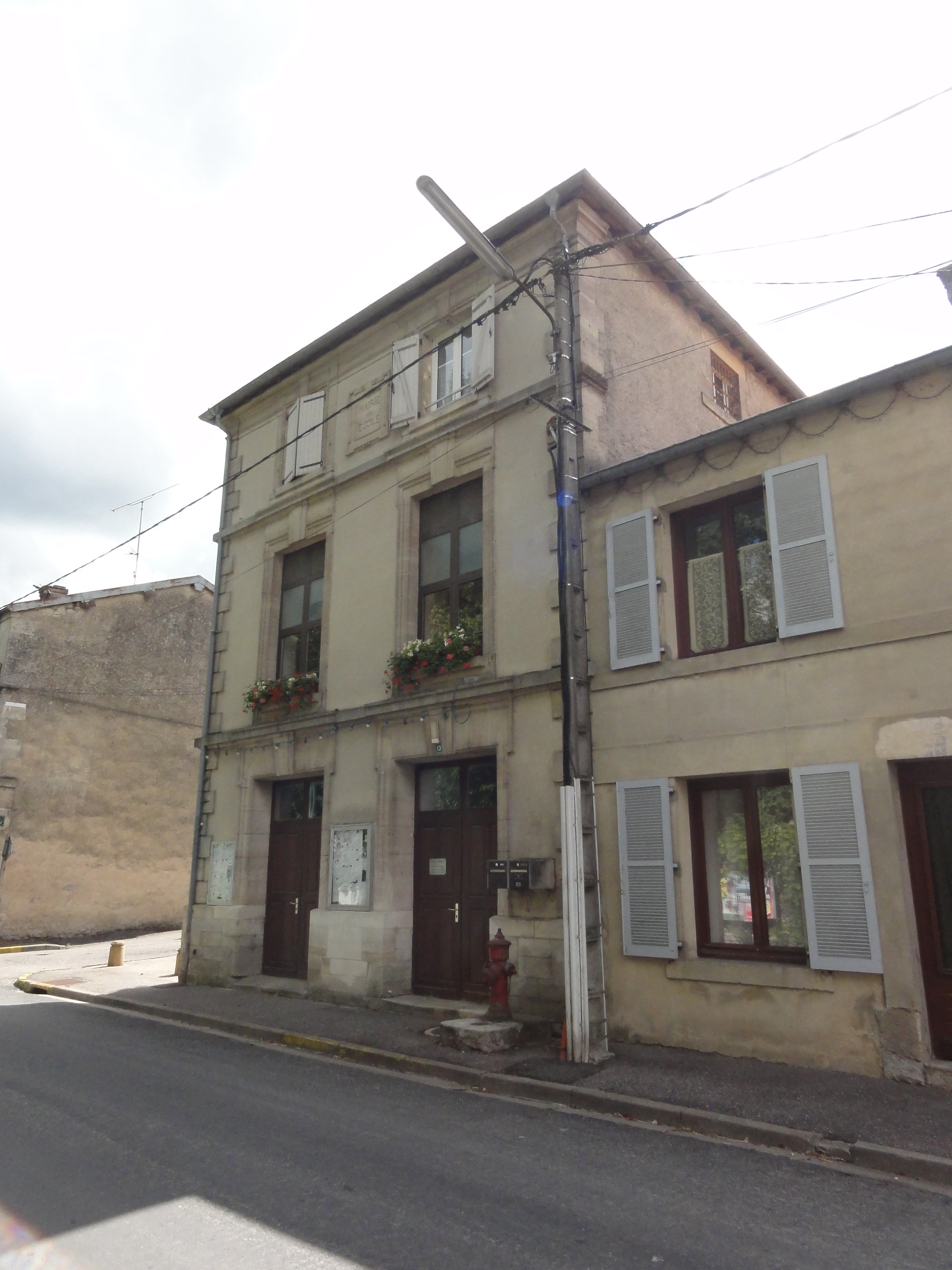
- The town hall in Guerpont

- Coat of arms
- Location of Guerpont
- Location within France Location within Grand Est
- Coordinates: 48°43′52″N 5°15′27″E
- Country: France
- Region: Grand Est
- Department: Meuse
- Arrondissement: Bar-le-Duc
- Canton: Ancerville
- Intercommunality: CA Bar-le-Duc - Sud Meuse

Government
  - Mayor (2020–2026): Patrick Bernard
- Area^{1}: 6.12 km^{2} (2.36 sq mi)
- Elevation: 210 m (690 ft)
- Highest elevation: 352 m (1,155 ft)
- Lowest elevation: 200 m (660 ft)
- Population (2023): 231
  - Density: 37.7/km^{2} (97.8/sq mi)
- Time zone: UTC+01:00 (CET)
  - Summer (DST): UTC+02:00 (CEST)
- INSEE/Postal code: 55221 /55000
- ^{1} French Land Register data, which excludes lakes, ponds, glaciers > 1 km^{2} (0.386 sq mi or 247 acres) and river estuaries.

Guerpont (French pronunciation: [ɡɛʁpɔ̃]) is a commune in the Meuse department in Grand Est in north-eastern France.

== See also ==
- Communes of the Meuse department
