= Nant-le-Petit =

- Commune
- Coat of arms
- Location of Nant-le-Petit
- Location within France Location within Grand Est
- Coordinates: 48°39′21″N 5°12′55″E
- Country: France
- Region: Grand Est
- Department: Meuse
- Arrondissement: Bar-le-Duc
- Canton: Ancerville
- Intercommunality: CC Portes de Meuse

Government
  - Mayor (2020–2026): Dominique Pensalfini-Demorise
- Area^{1}: 9.02 km^{2} (3.48 sq mi)
- Elevation: 200 m (660 ft)
- Highest elevation: 331 m (1,086 ft)
- Lowest elevation: 214 m (702 ft)
- Population (2023): 81
  - Density: 9.0/km^{2} (23/sq mi)
- Time zone: UTC+01:00 (CET)
  - Summer (DST): UTC+02:00 (CEST)
- INSEE/Postal code: 55374 /55500
- ^{1} French Land Register data, which excludes lakes, ponds, glaciers > 1 km^{2} (0.386 sq mi or 247 acres) and river estuaries.

Nant-le-Petit is a commune in the Meuse department in Grand Est in north-eastern France.

== See also ==
- Communes of the Meuse department
