= Maulan =

- Commune
- Coat of arms
- Location of Maulan
- Location within France Location within Grand Est
- Coordinates: 48°40′11″N 5°15′14″E
- Country: France
- Region: Grand Est
- Department: Meuse
- Arrondissement: Bar-le-Duc
- Canton: Ancerville

Government
  - Mayor (2020–2026): Tatiana Laurent
- Area^{1}: 4.22 km^{2} (1.63 sq mi)
- Elevation: 230 m (750 ft)
- Highest elevation: 347 m (1,138 ft)
- Lowest elevation: 262 m (860 ft)
- Population (2023): 107
  - Density: 25.4/km^{2} (65.7/sq mi)
- Time zone: UTC+01:00 (CET)
  - Summer (DST): UTC+02:00 (CEST)
- INSEE/Postal code: 55326 /55500
- ^{1} French Land Register data, which excludes lakes, ponds, glaciers > 1 km^{2} (0.386 sq mi or 247 acres) and river estuaries.

Maulan (French pronunciation: [molɑ̃]) is a commune in the Meuse department in Grand Est in north-eastern France.

== See also ==
- Communes of the Meuse department
