= L'Isle-en-Rigault =

- Commune
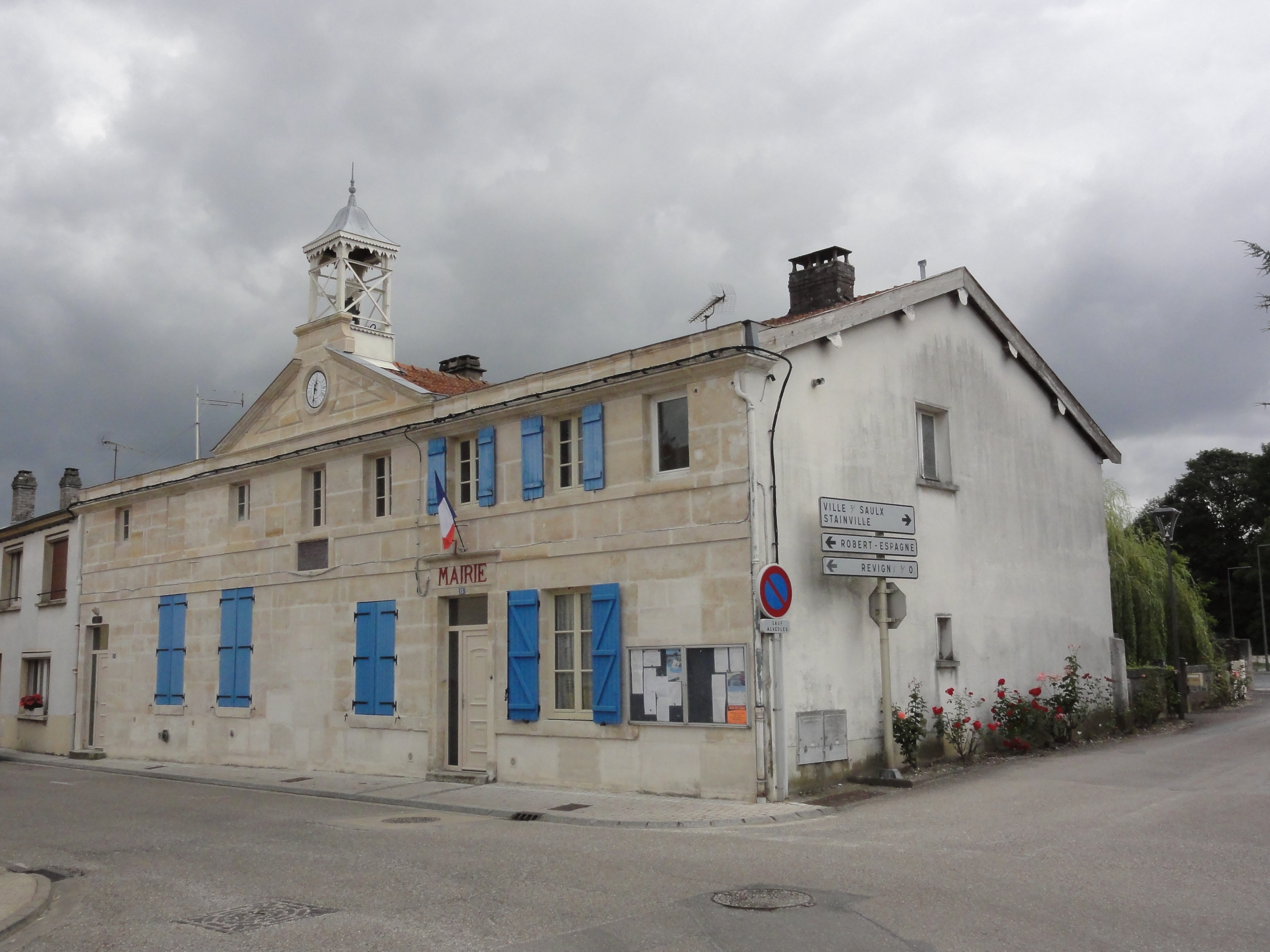
- The town hall in L'Isle-en-Rigault

- Coat of arms
- Location of L'Isle-en-Rigault
- Location within France Location within Grand Est
- Coordinates: 48°43′07″N 5°02′53″E
- Country: France
- Region: Grand Est
- Department: Meuse
- Arrondissement: Bar-le-Duc
- Canton: Ancerville
- Intercommunality: Portes de Meuse

Government
  - Mayor (2020–2026): Bernard Henrionnet
- Area^{1}: 10.54 km^{2} (4.07 sq mi)
- Elevation: 187 m (614 ft)
- Highest elevation: 236 m (774 ft)
- Lowest elevation: 162 m (531 ft)
- Population (2023): 460
  - Density: 44/km^{2} (110/sq mi)
- Time zone: UTC+01:00 (CET)
  - Summer (DST): UTC+02:00 (CEST)
- INSEE/Postal code: 55296 /55000
- ^{1} French Land Register data, which excludes lakes, ponds, glaciers > 1 km^{2} (0.386 sq mi or 247 acres) and river estuaries.

L'Isle-en-Rigault (French pronunciation: [lil ɑ̃ ʁiɡo]; before 2017: Lisle-en-Rigault) is a commune in the Meuse department in Grand Est in north-eastern France.

== See also ==
- Communes of the Meuse department

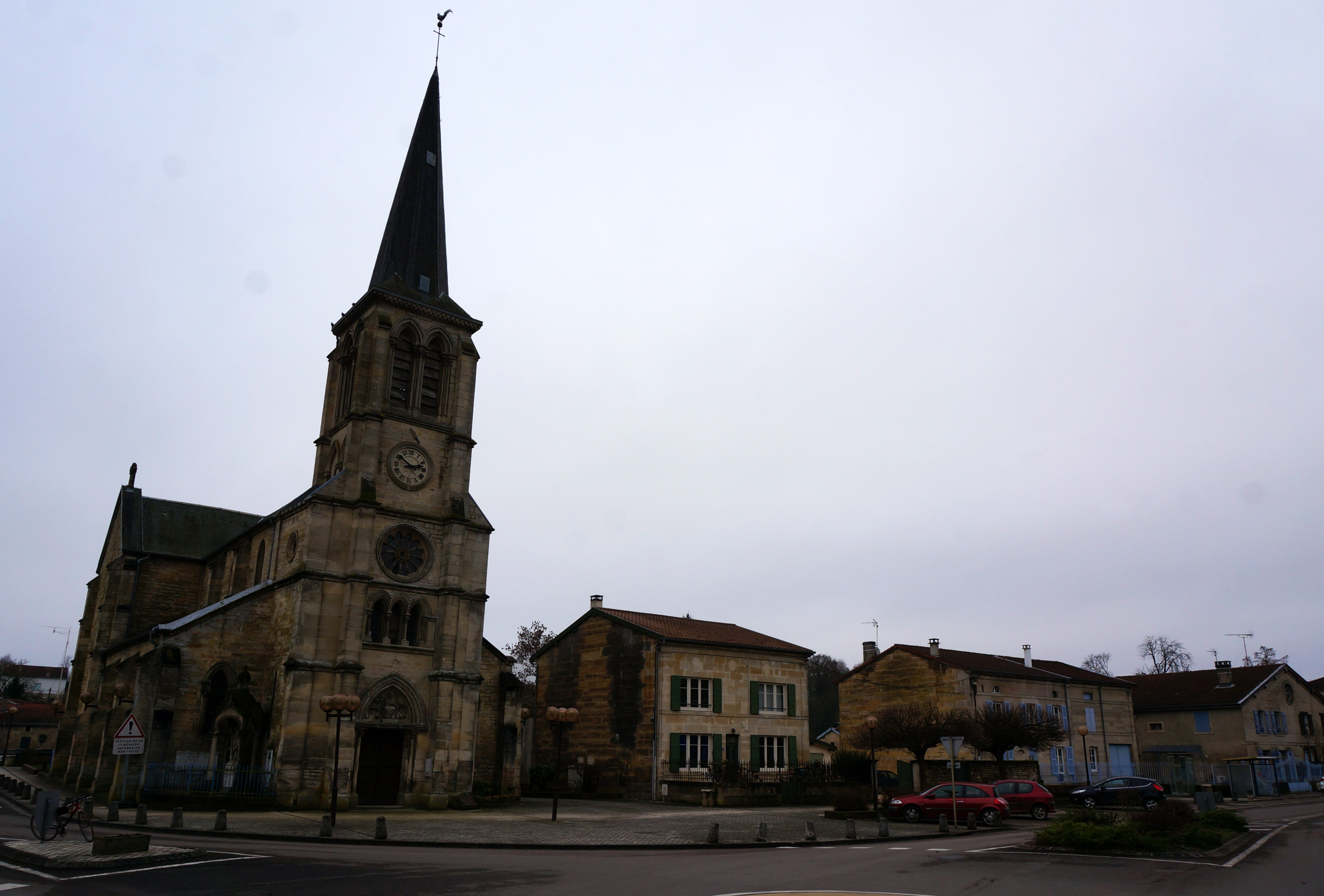
Church
