= Rupt-aux-Nonains =

- Commune
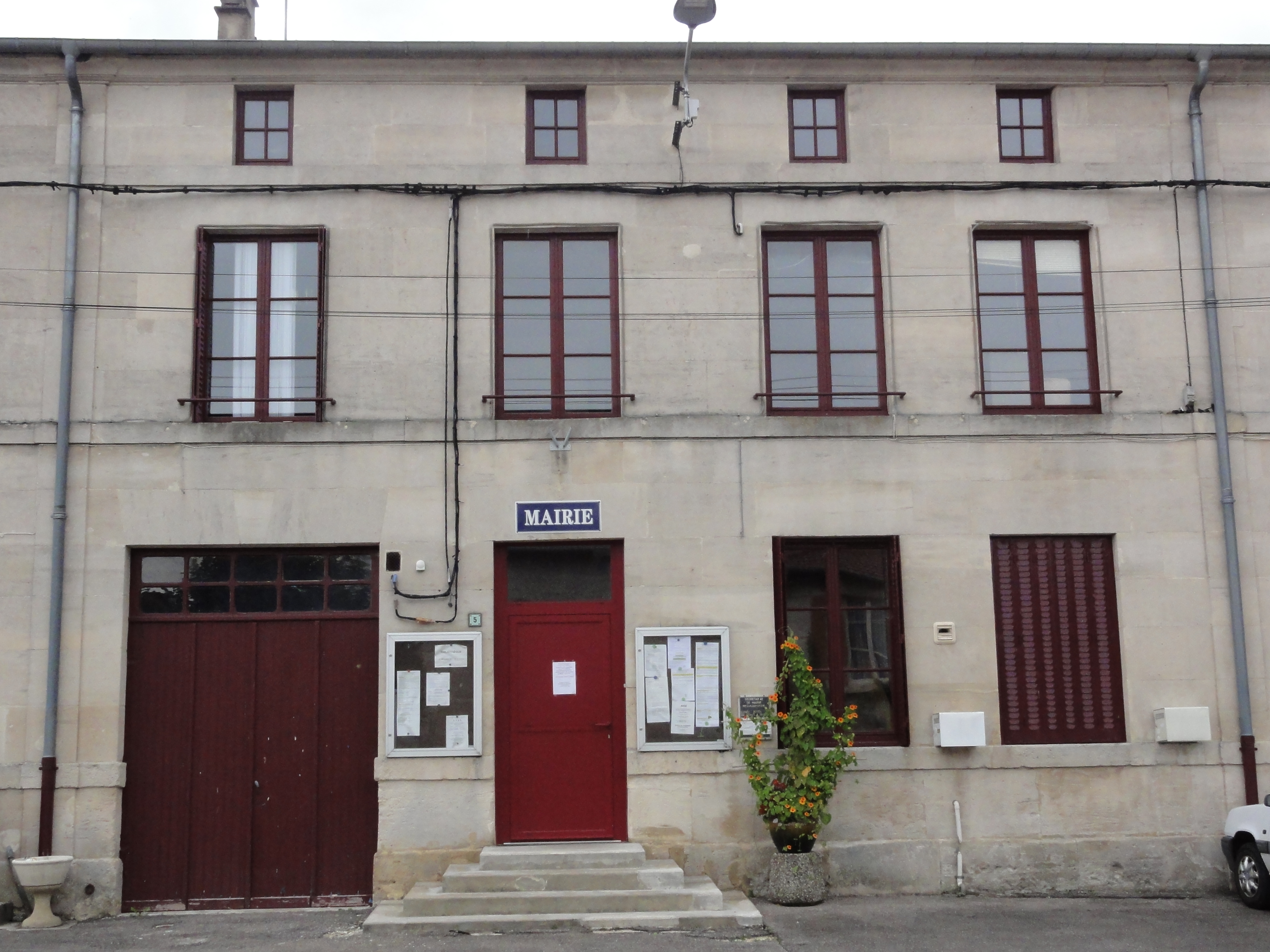
- The town hall in Rupt-aux-Nonains

- Coat of arms
- Location of Rupt-aux-Nonains
- Location within France Location within Grand Est
- Coordinates: 48°40′18″N 5°06′53″E
- Country: France
- Region: Grand Est
- Department: Meuse
- Arrondissement: Bar-le-Duc
- Canton: Ancerville
- Intercommunality: CC Portes de Meuse

Government
  - Mayor (2020–2026): Yannik Intins
- Area^{1}: 20.4 km^{2} (7.9 sq mi)
- Elevation: 190 m (620 ft)
- Highest elevation: 271 m (889 ft)
- Lowest elevation: 173 m (568 ft)
- Population (2023): 365
  - Density: 17.9/km^{2} (46.3/sq mi)
- Time zone: UTC+01:00 (CET)
  - Summer (DST): UTC+02:00 (CEST)
- INSEE/Postal code: 55447 /55170
- ^{1} French Land Register data, which excludes lakes, ponds, glaciers > 1 km^{2} (0.386 sq mi or 247 acres) and river estuaries.

Rupt-aux-Nonains (French pronunciation: [ʁy o nɔnɛ̃]) is a commune in the Meuse department in Grand Est in north-eastern France. It lies on the Saulx, which is crossed here by the bridge, carrying the date 1557, that is the commune's most notable feature.

== See also ==
- Communes of the Meuse department
