= Érize-la-Petite =

- Commune
- Coat of arms
- Location of Érize-la-Petite
- Location within France Location within Grand Est
- Coordinates: 48°55′08″N 5°14′32″E
- Country: France
- Region: Grand Est
- Department: Meuse
- Arrondissement: Bar-le-Duc
- Canton: Revigny-sur-Ornain
- Intercommunality: CC de l'Aire à l'Argonne

Government
  - Mayor (2020–2026): Katya Chasseigne
- Area^{1}: 7.18 km^{2} (2.77 sq mi)
- Elevation: 250 m (820 ft)
- Highest elevation: 326 m (1,070 ft)
- Lowest elevation: 234 m (768 ft)
- Population (2023): 45
  - Density: 6.3/km^{2} (16/sq mi)
- Time zone: UTC+01:00 (CET)
  - Summer (DST): UTC+02:00 (CEST)
- INSEE/Postal code: 55177 /55260
- ^{1} French Land Register data, which excludes lakes, ponds, glaciers > 1 km^{2} (0.386 sq mi or 247 acres) and river estuaries.

Érize-la-Petite (French pronunciation: [eʁiz la pətit]) is a commune in the Meuse department in Grand Est in north-eastern France.

== See also ==
- Communes of the Meuse department
