= Juvigny-en-Perthois =

- Commune
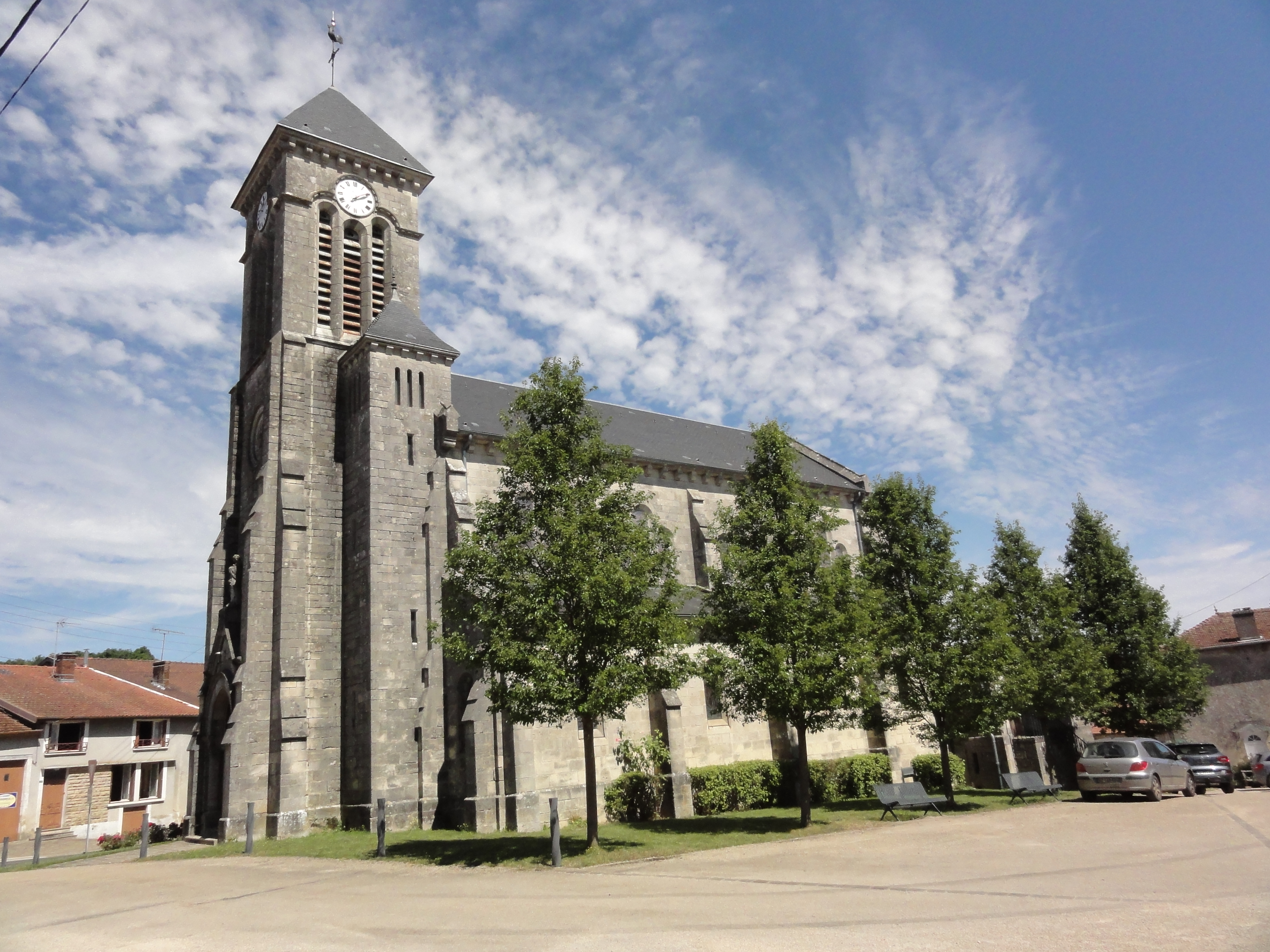
- The church in Juvigny-en-Perthois

- Coat of arms
- Location of Juvigny-en-Perthois
- Location within France Location within Grand Est
- Coordinates: 48°35′55″N 5°09′18″E
- Country: France
- Region: Grand Est
- Department: Meuse
- Arrondissement: Bar-le-Duc
- Canton: Ancerville
- Intercommunality: CC Portes de Meuse

Government
  - Mayor (2020–2026): Philippe Malaize
- Area^{1}: 6.36 km^{2} (2.46 sq mi)
- Elevation: 283 m (928 ft)
- Highest elevation: 297 m (974 ft)
- Lowest elevation: 232 m (761 ft)
- Population (2023): 129
  - Density: 20.3/km^{2} (52.5/sq mi)
- Time zone: UTC+01:00 (CET)
  - Summer (DST): UTC+02:00 (CEST)
- INSEE/Postal code: 55261 /55170
- ^{1} French Land Register data, which excludes lakes, ponds, glaciers > 1 km^{2} (0.386 sq mi or 247 acres) and river estuaries.

Juvigny-en-Perthois (French pronunciation: [ʒyviɲi ɑ̃ pɛʁtwa]) is a commune in the Meuse department in Grand Est in north-eastern France.

== See also ==
- Communes of the Meuse department
