= Baudonvilliers =

- Commune
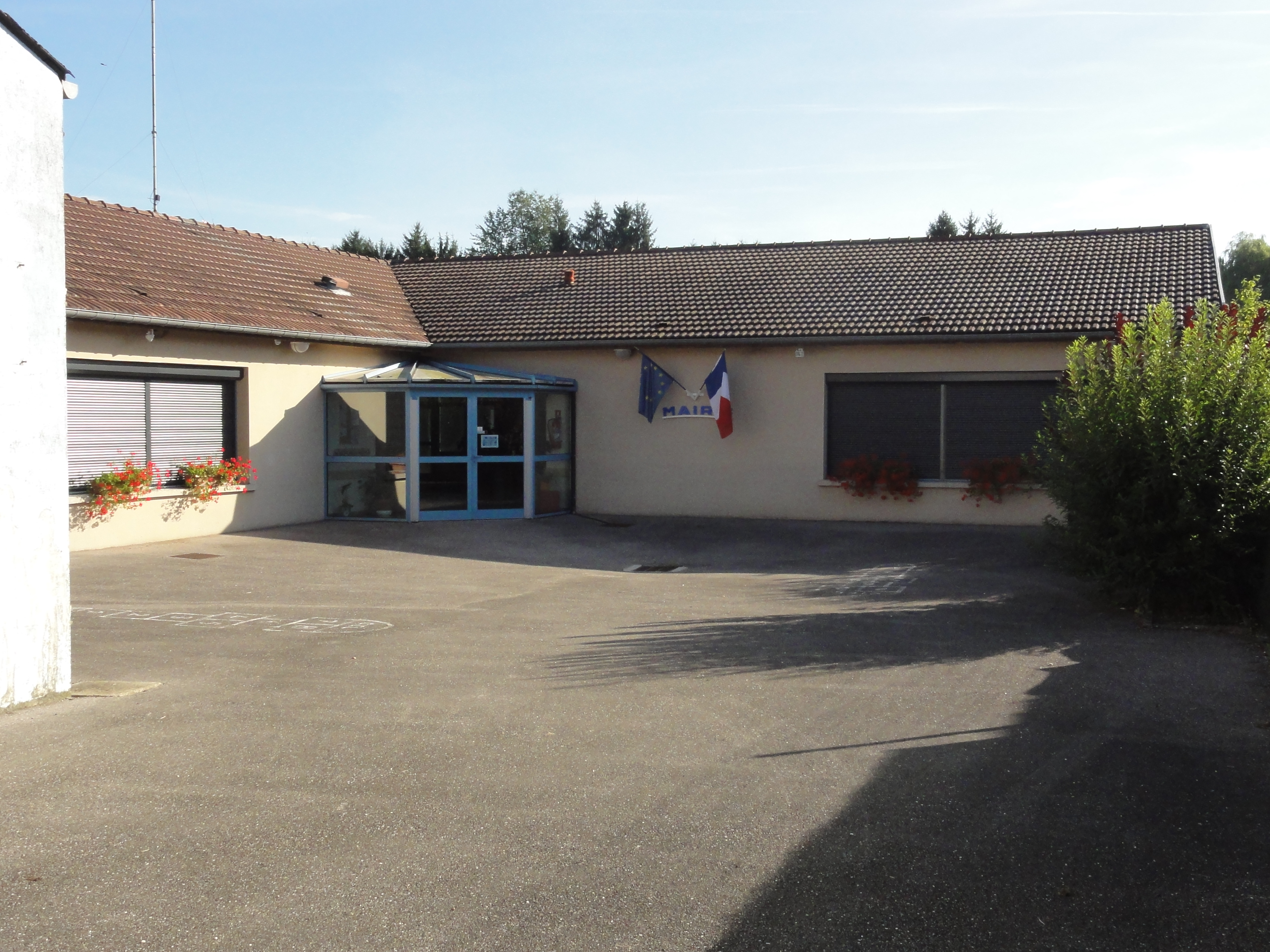
- The town hall in Baudonvilliers

- Coat of arms
- Location of Baudonvilliers
- Location within France Location within Grand Est
- Coordinates: 48°41′19″N 5°01′04″E
- Country: France
- Region: Grand Est
- Department: Meuse
- Arrondissement: Bar-le-Duc
- Canton: Ancerville
- Intercommunality: Portes de Meuse

Government
  - Mayor (2020–2026): Marc Nicole
- Area^{1}: 3.07 km^{2} (1.19 sq mi)
- Elevation: 189 m (620 ft)
- Highest elevation: 217 m (712 ft)
- Lowest elevation: 172 m (564 ft)
- Population (2023): 377
  - Density: 123/km^{2} (318/sq mi)
- Time zone: UTC+01:00 (CET)
  - Summer (DST): UTC+02:00 (CEST)
- INSEE/Postal code: 55031 /55170
- ^{1} French Land Register data, which excludes lakes, ponds, glaciers > 1 km^{2} (0.386 sq mi or 247 acres) and river estuaries.

Baudonvilliers (French pronunciation: [bodɔ̃vilje]) is a commune in the Meuse department in the Grand Est region in northeastern France.

== Population ==
Historical population
| Year | Pop. | ±% p.a. |
|---|---|---|
| 1968 | 146 | — |
| 1975 | 142 | −0.40% |
| 1982 | 461 | +18.32% |
| 1990 | 483 | +0.58% |
| 1999 | 461 | −0.52% |
| 2007 | 449 | −0.33% |
| 2012 | 406 | −1.99% |
| 2017 | 378 | −1.42% |
| 2023 | 377 | −0.04% |
Source: INSEE

== See also ==
- Communes of the Meuse department
