= Willeroncourt =

- Commune
- Coat of arms
- Location of Willeroncourt
- Location within France Location within Grand Est
- Coordinates: 48°43′01″N 5°22′01″E
- Country: France
- Region: Grand Est
- Department: Meuse
- Arrondissement: Bar-le-Duc
- Canton: Vaucouleurs
- Intercommunality: Commercy-Void-Vaucouleurs

Government
  - Mayor (2020–2026): Nicolas Lafrogne
- Area^{1}: 7.89 km^{2} (3.05 sq mi)
- Elevation: 285 m (935 ft)
- Highest elevation: 386 m (1,266 ft)
- Lowest elevation: 237 m (778 ft)
- Population (2023): 109
  - Density: 13.8/km^{2} (35.8/sq mi)
- Time zone: UTC+01:00 (CET)
  - Summer (DST): UTC+02:00 (CEST)
- INSEE/Postal code: 55581 /55500
- ^{1} French Land Register data, which excludes lakes, ponds, glaciers > 1 km^{2} (0.386 sq mi or 247 acres) and river estuaries.

Willeroncourt is a commune in the Meuse department in Grand Est in northeastern France.

== Population ==
Historical population
Year	Pop.	±% p.a.
1968	141	—
1975	117	−2.63%
1982	103	−1.80%
1990	110	+0.83%
1999	119	+0.88%
2007	126	+0.72%
2012	118	−1.30%
2017	107	−1.94%
2023	109	+0.31%
Source: INSEE

== See also ==
- Communes of the Meuse department
