= Montplonne =

- Commune
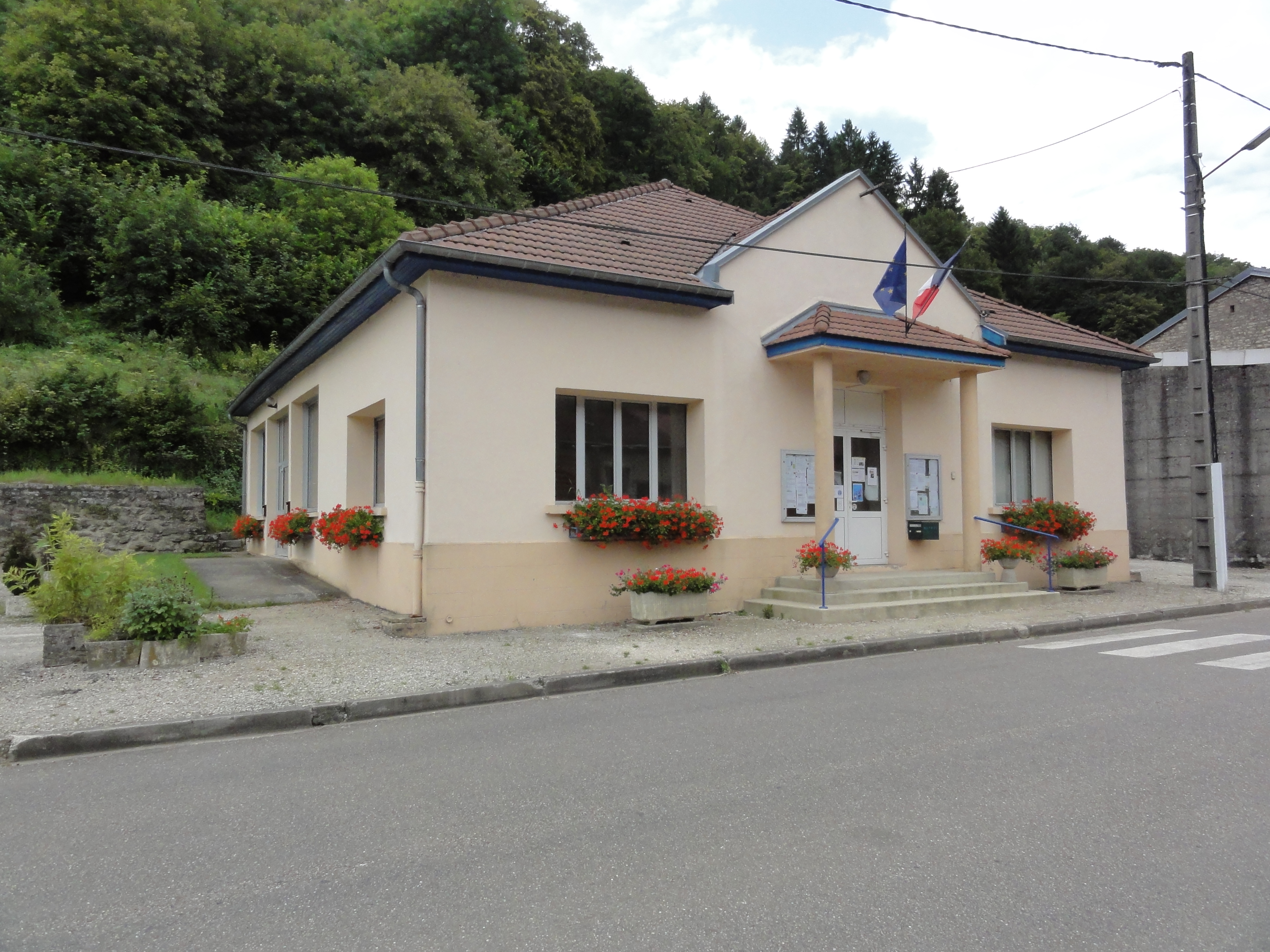
- The town hall in Montplonne

- Coat of arms
- Location of Montplonne
- Location within France Location within Grand Est
- Coordinates: 48°41′29″N 5°10′22″E
- Country: France
- Region: Grand Est
- Department: Meuse
- Arrondissement: Bar-le-Duc
- Canton: Ancerville
- Intercommunality: CC Portes de Meuse

Government
  - Mayor (2020–2026): Éric Villette
- Area^{1}: 20.68 km^{2} (7.98 sq mi)
- Elevation: 205 m (673 ft)
- Highest elevation: 335 m (1,099 ft)
- Lowest elevation: 198 m (650 ft)
- Population (2023): 131
  - Density: 6.33/km^{2} (16.4/sq mi)
- Time zone: UTC+01:00 (CET)
  - Summer (DST): UTC+02:00 (CEST)
- INSEE/Postal code: 55352 /55000
- ^{1} French Land Register data, which excludes lakes, ponds, glaciers > 1 km^{2} (0.386 sq mi or 247 acres) and river estuaries.

Montplonne (French pronunciation: [mɔ̃plɔn]) is a commune in the Meuse department in Grand Est in north-eastern France.

== See also ==
- Communes of the Meuse department
