= Lavincourt =

- Commune
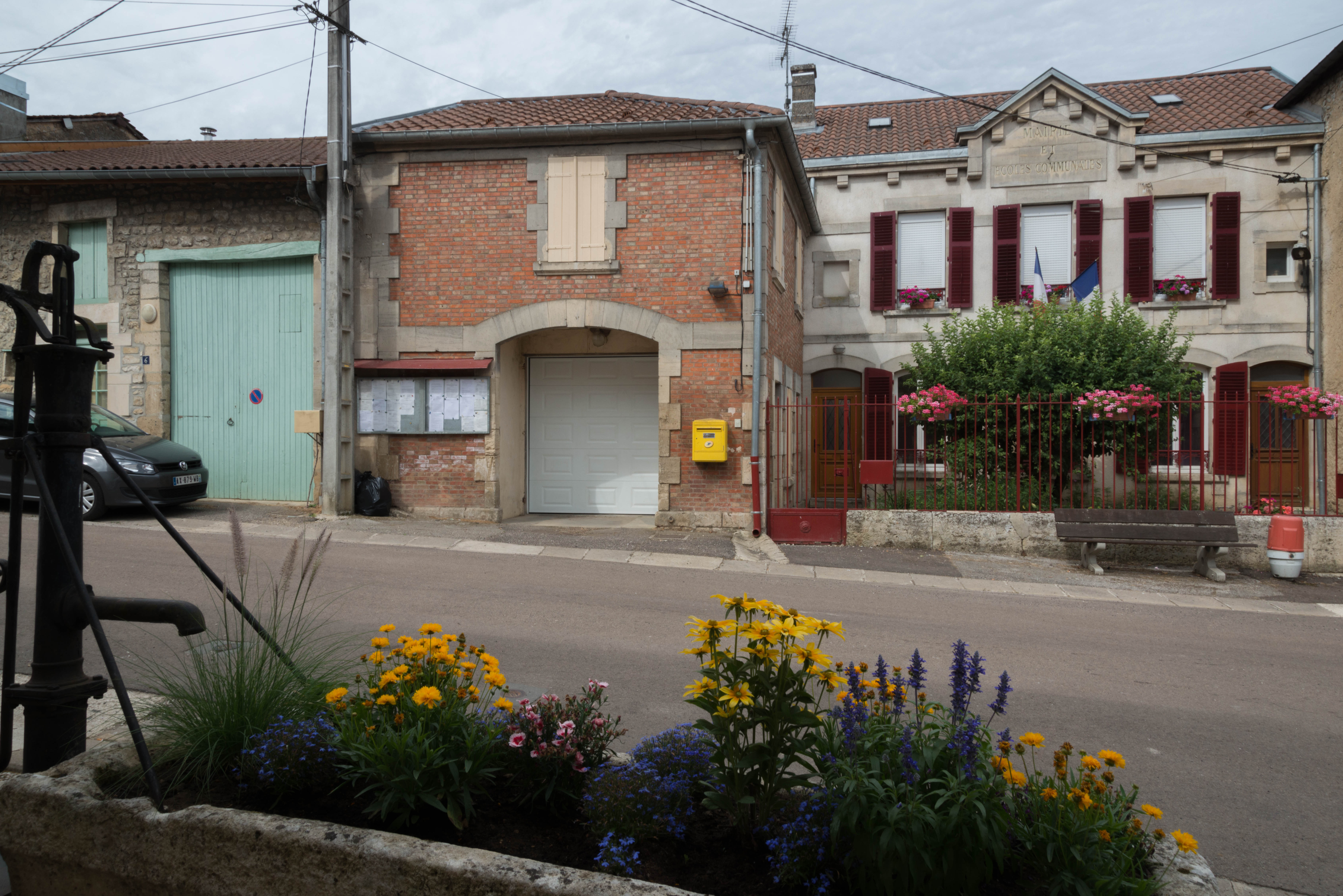
- The town hall in Lavincourt

- Coat of arms
- Location of Lavincourt
- Location within France Location within Grand Est
- Coordinates: 48°39′45″N 5°09′09″E
- Country: France
- Region: Grand Est
- Department: Meuse
- Arrondissement: Bar-le-Duc
- Canton: Ancerville
- Intercommunality: CC Portes de Meuse

Government
  - Mayor (2020–2026): Gilles Dubaux
- Area^{1}: 4.7 km^{2} (1.8 sq mi)
- Elevation: 168 m (551 ft)
- Highest elevation: 280 m (920 ft)
- Lowest elevation: 191 m (627 ft)
- Population (2023): 70
  - Density: 15/km^{2} (39/sq mi)
- Time zone: UTC+01:00 (CET)
  - Summer (DST): UTC+02:00 (CEST)
- INSEE/Postal code: 55284 /55170
- ^{1} French Land Register data, which excludes lakes, ponds, glaciers > 1 km^{2} (0.386 sq mi or 247 acres) and river estuaries.

Lavincourt (French pronunciation: [lavɛ̃kuʁ]) is a commune in the Meuse department in Grand Est in north-eastern France.

== See also ==
- Communes of the Meuse department
