= Sommelonne =

- Commune
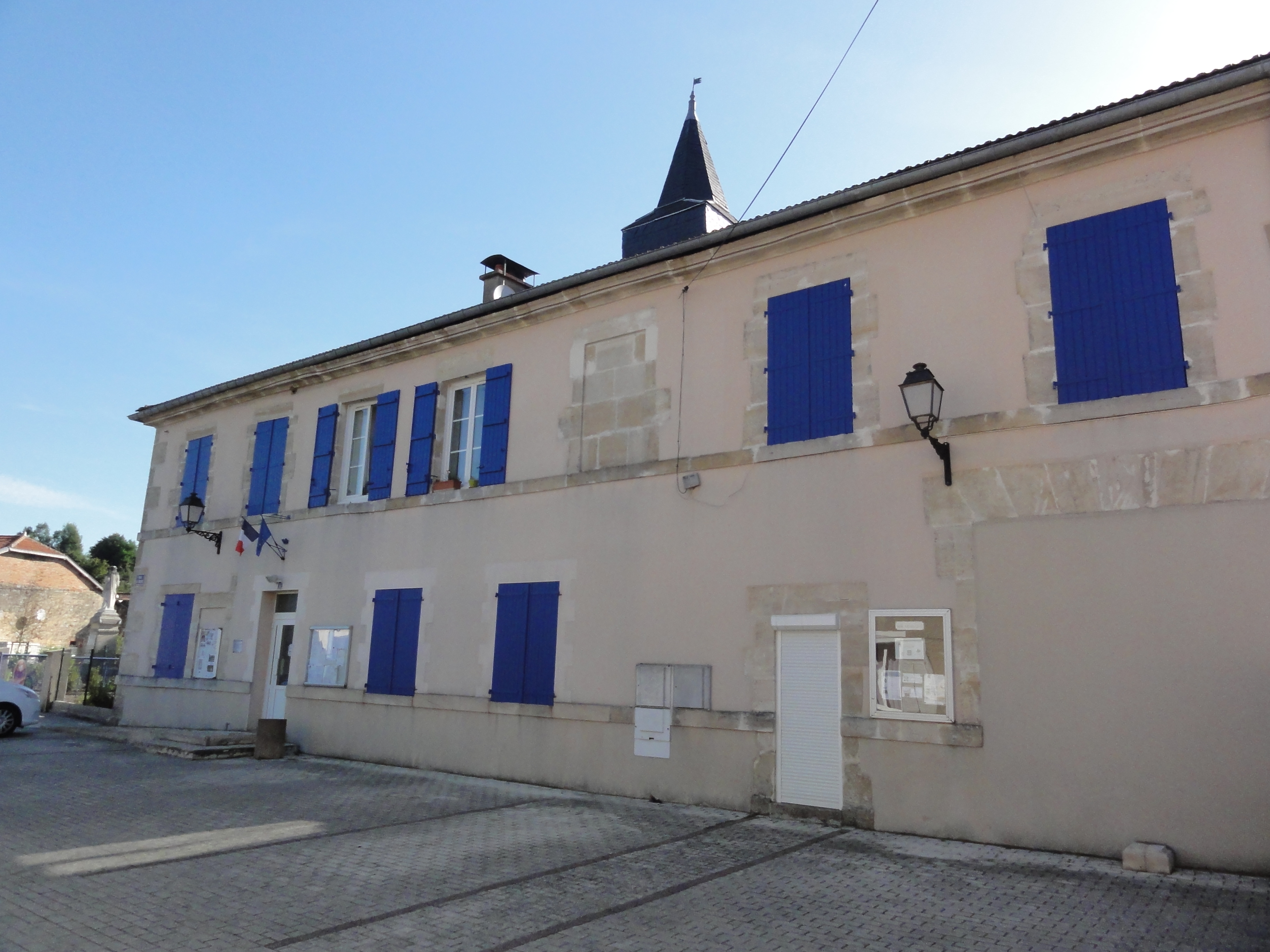
- The town hall in Sommelonne

- Coat of arms
- Location of Sommelonne
- Location within France Location within Grand Est
- Coordinates: 48°40′20″N 5°02′18″E
- Country: France
- Region: Grand Est
- Department: Meuse
- Arrondissement: Bar-le-Duc
- Canton: Ancerville
- Intercommunality: CC Portes de Meuse

Government
  - Mayor (2020–2026): Roland Dufour
- Area^{1}: 10.22 km^{2} (3.95 sq mi)
- Elevation: 186 m (610 ft)
- Highest elevation: 230 m (750 ft)
- Lowest elevation: 165 m (541 ft)
- Population (2023): 407
  - Density: 39.8/km^{2} (103/sq mi)
- Time zone: UTC+01:00 (CET)
  - Summer (DST): UTC+02:00 (CEST)
- INSEE/Postal code: 55494 /55170
- ^{1} French Land Register data, which excludes lakes, ponds, glaciers > 1 km^{2} (0.386 sq mi or 247 acres) and river estuaries.

Sommelonne (French pronunciation: [sɔmlɔn]) is a commune in the Meuse department in Grand Est in north-eastern France.

== See also ==
- Communes of the Meuse department
