= Nant-le-Grand =

- Commune
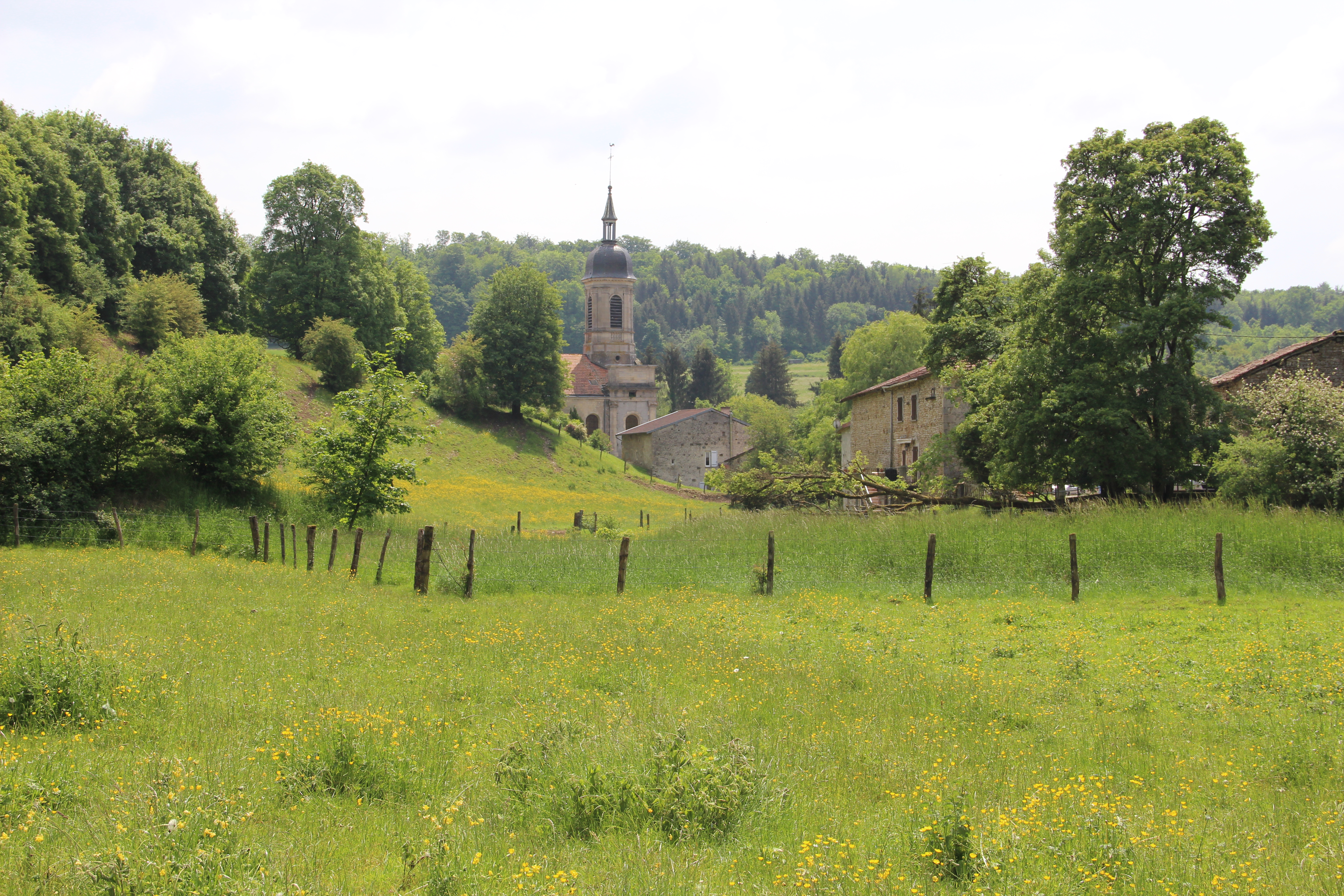
- A general view of Nant-le-Grand

- Coat of arms
- Location of Nant-le-Grand
- Location within France Location within Grand Est
- Coordinates: 48°40′43″N 5°13′34″E
- Country: France
- Region: Grand Est
- Department: Meuse
- Arrondissement: Bar-le-Duc
- Canton: Ancerville
- Intercommunality: CA Bar-le-Duc - Sud Meuse

Government
  - Mayor (2020–2026): Marc Déprez
- Area^{1}: 11.26 km^{2} (4.35 sq mi)
- Elevation: 249 m (817 ft)
- Highest elevation: 351 m (1,152 ft)
- Lowest elevation: 233 m (764 ft)
- Population (2023): 82
  - Density: 7.3/km^{2} (19/sq mi)
- Time zone: UTC+01:00 (CET)
  - Summer (DST): UTC+02:00 (CEST)
- INSEE/Postal code: 55373 /55500
- ^{1} French Land Register data, which excludes lakes, ponds, glaciers > 1 km^{2} (0.386 sq mi or 247 acres) and river estuaries.

Nant-le-Grand is a commune in the Meuse department in Grand Est in north-eastern France.

== Population ==
Historical population
Year	Pop.	±% p.a.
1968	73	—
1975	58	−3.23%
1982	53	−1.28%
1990	67	+2.97%
1999	66	−0.17%
2007	70	+0.74%
2012	67	−0.87%
2017	79	+3.35%
2023	82	+0.62%
Source: INSEE

== See also ==
- Communes of the Meuse department
