= Canton of Ancerville =

Coordinates: 48.64°N 5.02°E

The canton of Ancerville is an administrative division of the Meuse department, northeastern France. Its borders were modified at the French canton reorganisation which came into effect in March 2015. Its seat is in Ancerville.

It consists of the following communes:

1. Ancerville
2. Aulnois-en-Perthois
3. Baudonvilliers
4. Bazincourt-sur-Saulx
5. Brillon-en-Barrois
6. Cousances-les-Forges
7. Guerpont
8. Haironville
9. L'Isle-en-Rigault
10. Juvigny-en-Perthois
11. Lavincourt
12. Maulan
13. Montplonne
14. Nant-le-Grand
15. Nant-le-Petit
16. Rupt-aux-Nonains
17. Saudrupt
18. Savonnières-en-Perthois
19. Silmont
20. Sommelonne
21. Stainville
22. Tannois
23. Tronville-en-Barrois
24. Velaines
25. Ville-sur-Saulx
