= Aulnois-en-Perthois =

- Commune
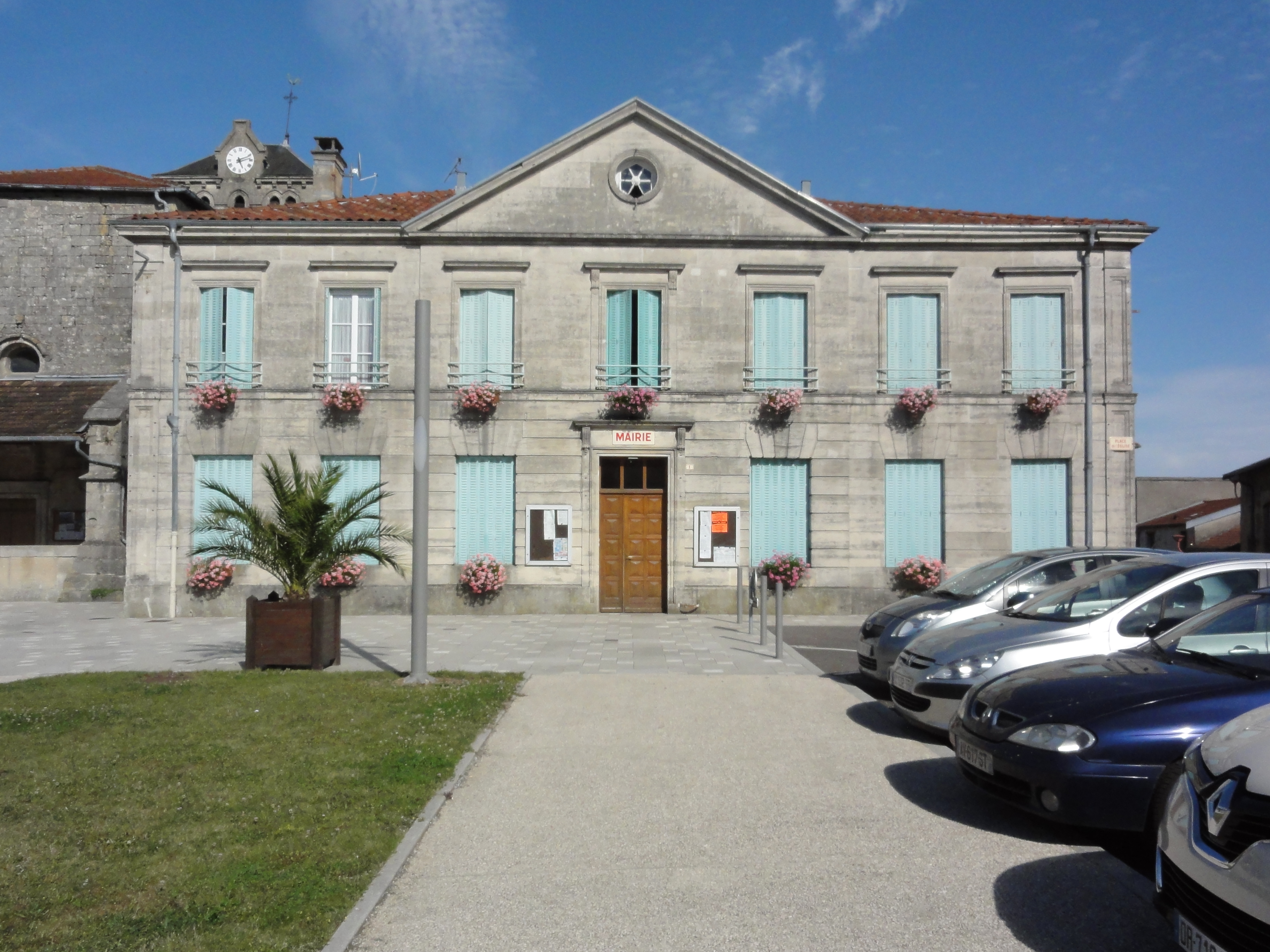
- The town hall in Aulnois-en-Perthois

- Coat of arms
- Location of Aulnois-en-Perthois
- Location within France Location within Grand Est
- Coordinates: 48°38′08″N 5°07′48″E
- Country: France
- Region: Grand Est
- Department: Meuse
- Arrondissement: Bar-le-Duc
- Canton: Ancerville
- Intercommunality: Portes de Meuse

Government
  - Mayor (2020–2026): Serge Muller
- Area^{1}: 10.75 km^{2} (4.15 sq mi)
- Highest elevation: 279 m (915 ft)
- Lowest elevation: 229 m (751 ft)
- Population (2023): 462
  - Density: 43.0/km^{2} (111/sq mi)
- Time zone: UTC+01:00 (CET)
  - Summer (DST): UTC+02:00 (CEST)
- INSEE/Postal code: 55015 /55170
- ^{1} French Land Register data, which excludes lakes, ponds, glaciers > 1 km^{2} (0.386 sq mi or 247 acres) and river estuaries.

Aulnois-en-Perthois is a commune in the Meuse department in the Grand Est region in northeastern France.

== Population ==
Historical population
Year	Pop.	±% p.a.
1968	360	—
1975	331	−1.19%
1982	376	+1.84%
1990	413	+1.18%
1999	421	+0.21%
2007	451	+0.86%
2012	511	+2.53%
2017	506	−0.20%
2023	462	−1.50%
Source: INSEE

== See also ==
- Communes of the Meuse department
