= Ancerville, Meuse =

Ancerville
- Commune
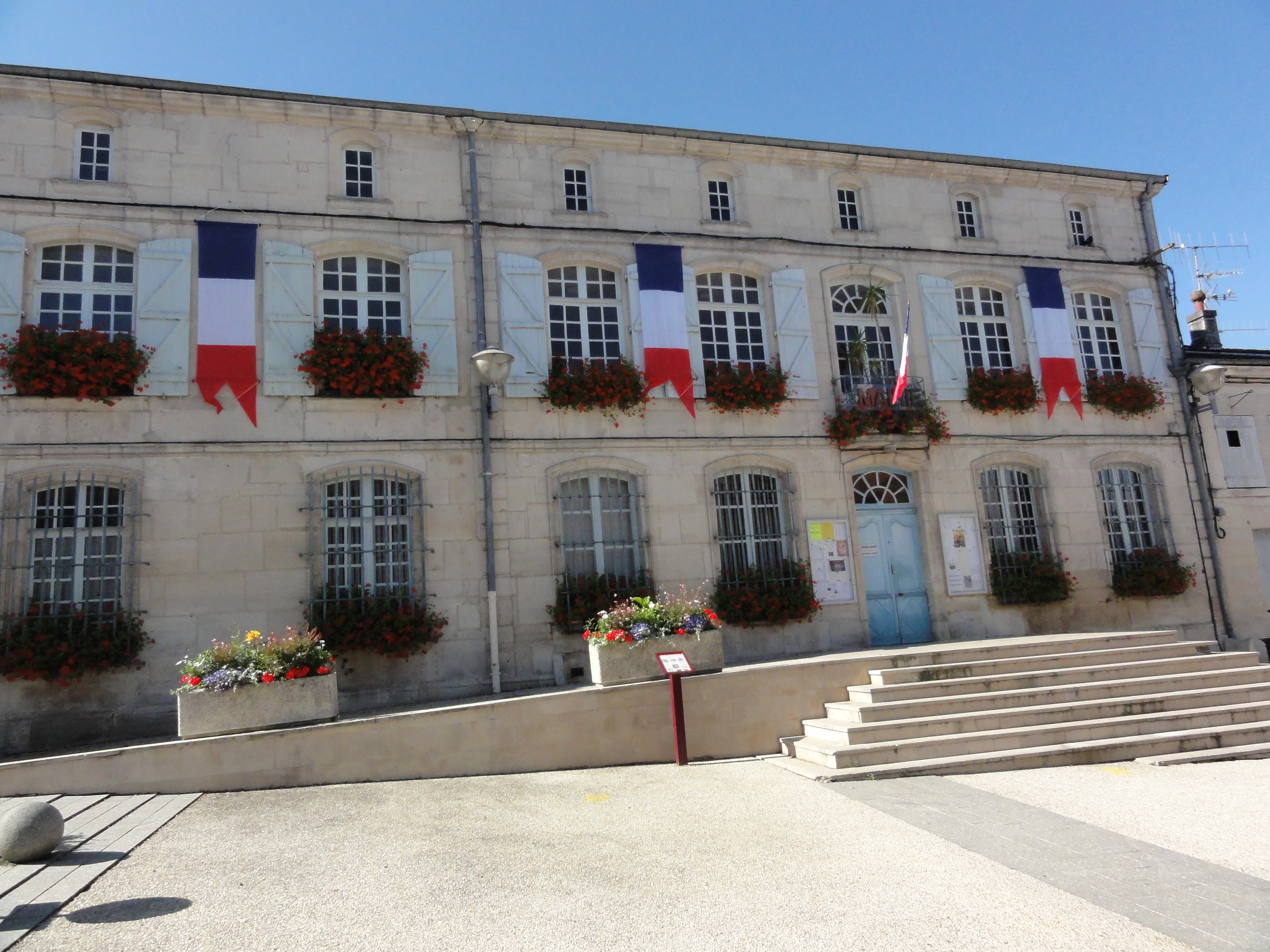
- The town hall in Ancerville

- Coat of arms
- Location of Ancerville
- Location within France Location within Grand Est
- Coordinates: 48°38′12″N 5°01′14″E
- Country: France
- Region: Grand Est
- Department: Meuse
- Arrondissement: Bar-le-Duc
- Canton: Ancerville
- Intercommunality: Portes de Meuse

Government
  - Mayor (2020–2026): Jean-Louis Canova
- Area^{1}: 21.58 km^{2} (8.33 sq mi)
- Elevation: 200 m (660 ft)
- Highest elevation: 251 m (823 ft)
- Lowest elevation: 147 m (482 ft)
- Population (2023): 2,569
  - Density: 119.0/km^{2} (308.3/sq mi)
- Time zone: UTC+01:00 (CET)
  - Summer (DST): UTC+02:00 (CEST)
- INSEE/Postal code: 55010 /55170
- ^{1} French Land Register data, which excludes lakes, ponds, glaciers > 1 km^{2} (0.386 sq mi or 247 acres) and river estuaries.

Ancerville (French pronunciation: [ɑ̃sɛʁvil]) is a commune in the Meuse department in the Grand Est region in northeastern France.

== Population ==
Historical population
Year	Pop.	±% p.a.
1968	2,560	—
1975	2,716	+0.85%
1982	2,833	+0.60%
1990	2,869	+0.16%
1999	2,726	−0.57%
2007	2,824	+0.44%
2012	2,728	−0.69%
2017	2,752	+0.18%
2023	2,569	−1.14%
Source: INSEE

== See also ==
- Communes of the Meuse department
