= Savonnières-en-Perthois =

- Commune
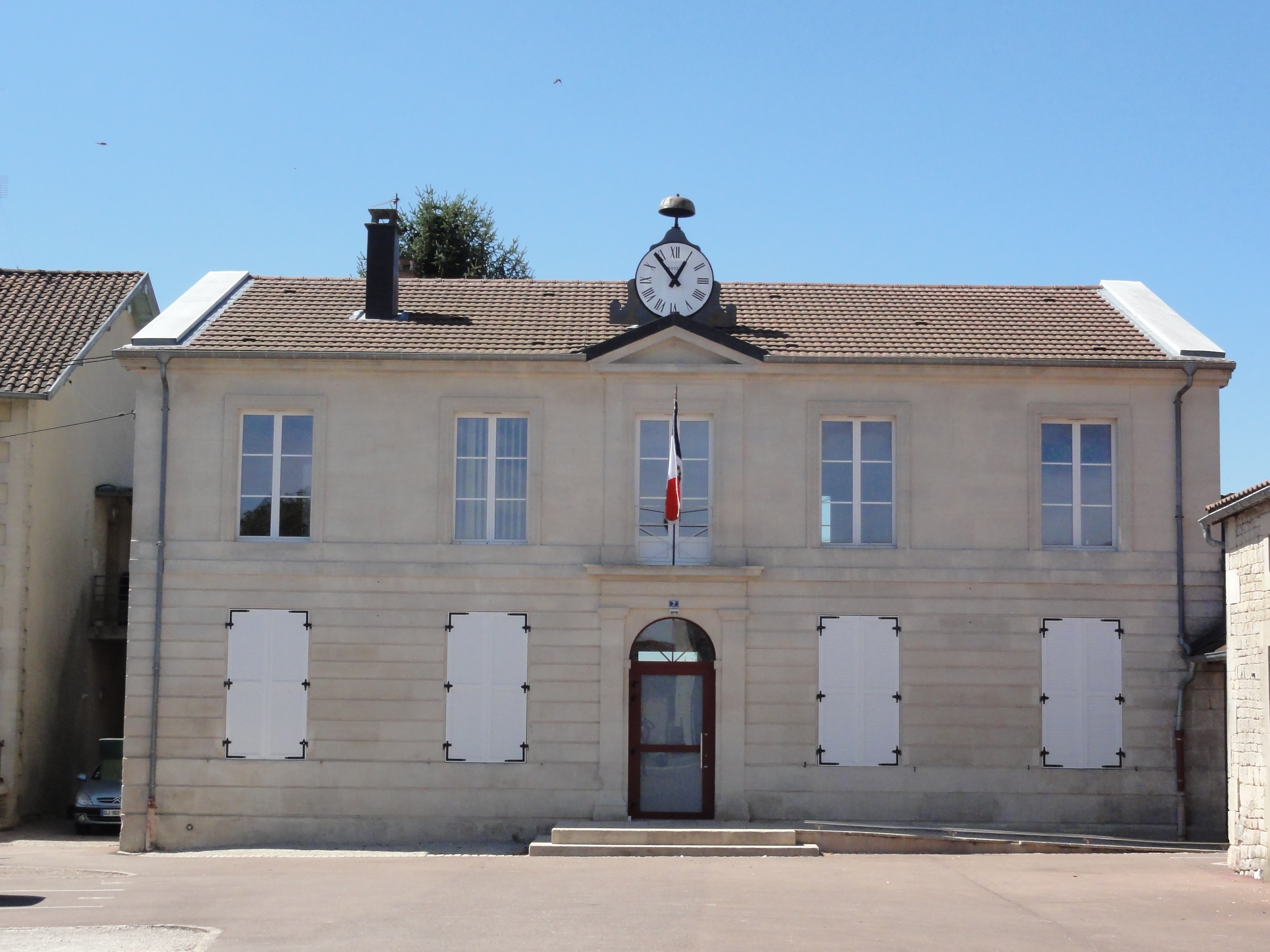
- The town hall in Savonnières-en-Perthois

- Coat of arms
- Location of Savonnières-en-Perthois
- Location within France Location within Grand Est
- Coordinates: 48°36′22″N 5°07′59″E
- Country: France
- Region: Grand Est
- Department: Meuse
- Arrondissement: Bar-le-Duc
- Canton: Ancerville
- Intercommunality: CC Portes de Meuse

Government
  - Mayor (2020–2026): Fabrice Petermann
- Area^{1}: 10.07 km^{2} (3.89 sq mi)
- Elevation: 285 m (935 ft)
- Highest elevation: 282 m (925 ft)
- Lowest elevation: 215 m (705 ft)
- Population (2023): 398
  - Density: 39.5/km^{2} (102/sq mi)
- Time zone: UTC+01:00 (CET)
  - Summer (DST): UTC+02:00 (CEST)
- INSEE/Postal code: 55477 /55170
- ^{1} French Land Register data, which excludes lakes, ponds, glaciers > 1 km^{2} (0.386 sq mi or 247 acres) and river estuaries.

Savonnières-en-Perthois is a commune in the Meuse department in Grand Est in north-eastern France.

== Climate ==
The commune has a temperate climate, classified as Cfb under the Köppen climate classification, with mild summers and no dry season. It is also classified as an altered oceanic climate by Météo-France, characterized by cold winters, moderate winds, and frequent fog in autumn and winter.

Between 1991 and 2020, the nearest Météo-France station at Chevillon recorded an average annual temperature of 11.1 °C and average annual precipitation of 982.1 mm.

== See also ==
- Communes of the Meuse department
