= Barrois =

Region in Lorraine, France

Coordinates: 48°43′16″N 05°07′46″E

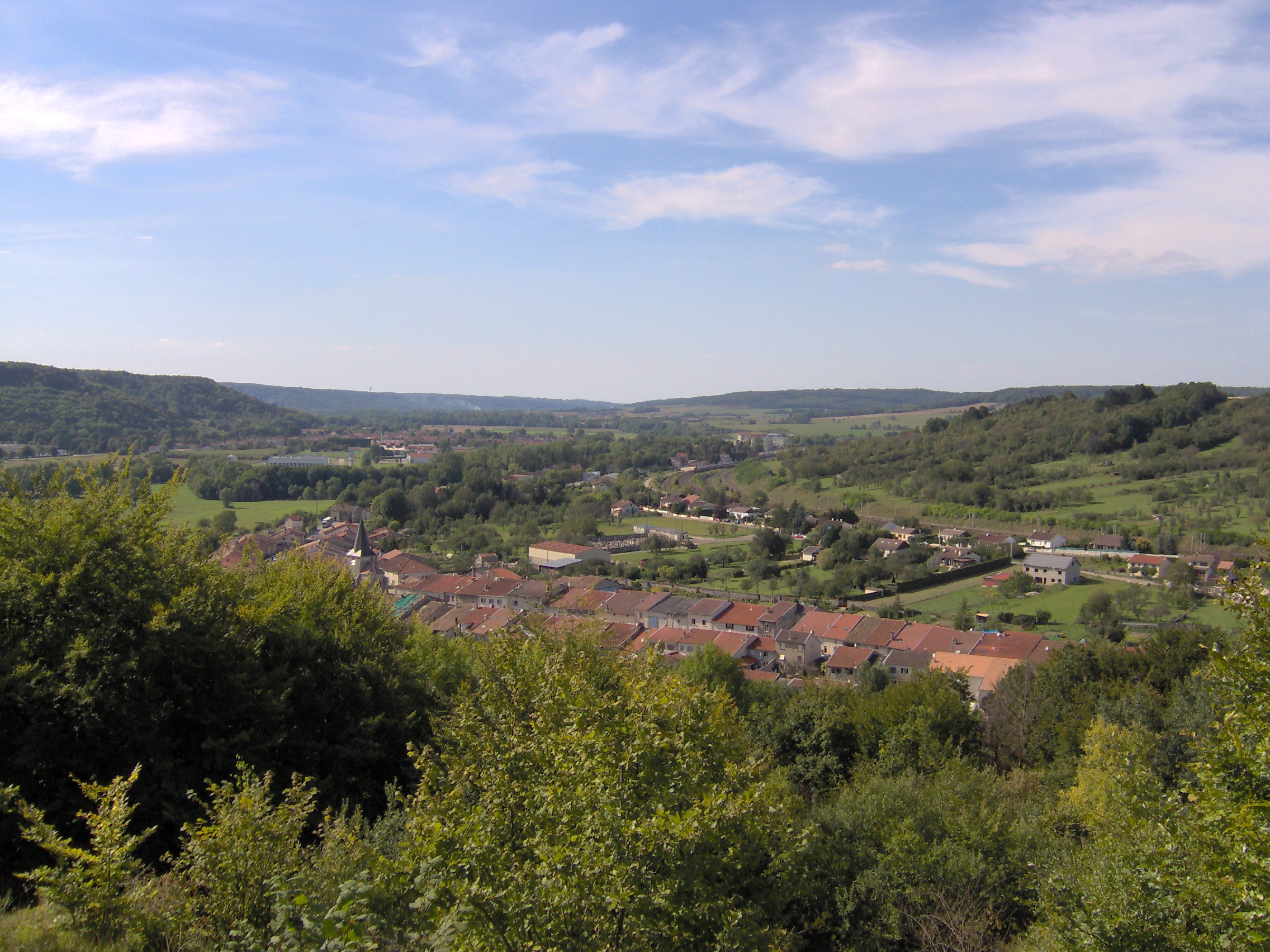
The village of Tronville-en-Barrois, 2005.

Barrois (French pronunciation: [baʁwa]) is a pays (a historic French division roughly equivalent to a county) in eastern France. In the Middle Ages, it was part of the Duchy of Bar, then bordering the Duchy of Lorraine. Today Barrois is a pays of the present-day region of Lorraine.
