= Canton of Montiers-sur-Saulx =

Former canton in Meuse, France

Coordinates: 48°32′29″N 5°13′10″E

- Former canton
- Location of the canton in the arrondissement of Bar-le-Duc
- Country: France
- Region: Grand Est
- Department: Meuse
- No. of communes: {{{nbcomm}}}
- Disbanded: 2015

Government
  - Representatives: Daniel Ruhland
- Population (2012): 2,754

The canton of Montiers-sur-Saulx (French: Canton de Montiers-sur-Saulx) is a former French canton located in the department of Meuse in the Lorraine region (now part of Grand Est). This canton was organized around Montiers-sur-Saulx in the arrondissement of Bar-le-Duc. It is now part of the canton of Ligny-en-Barrois.

The last general councillor from this canton was Daniel Ruhland (DVD), elected in 2008.

== Composition ==
The canton of Montiers-sur-Saulx grouped together 14 municipalities and had 2,754 inhabitants (2012 census without double counts).

1. Biencourt-sur-Orge
2. Le Bouchon-sur-Saulx
3. Brauvilliers
4. Bure
5. Couvertpuis
6. Dammarie-sur-Saulx
7. Fouchères-aux-Bois
8. Hévilliers
9. Mandres-en-Barrois
10. Ménil-sur-Saulx
11. Montiers-sur-Saulx
12. Morley
13. Ribeaucourt
14. Villers-le-Sec
