= Ribeaucourt =

Ribeaucourt may refer to the following places in France:

- Ribeaucourt, Meuse, a commune in the Meuse department
- Ribeaucourt, Somme, a commune in the Somme department
