= Mauvages =

- Commune
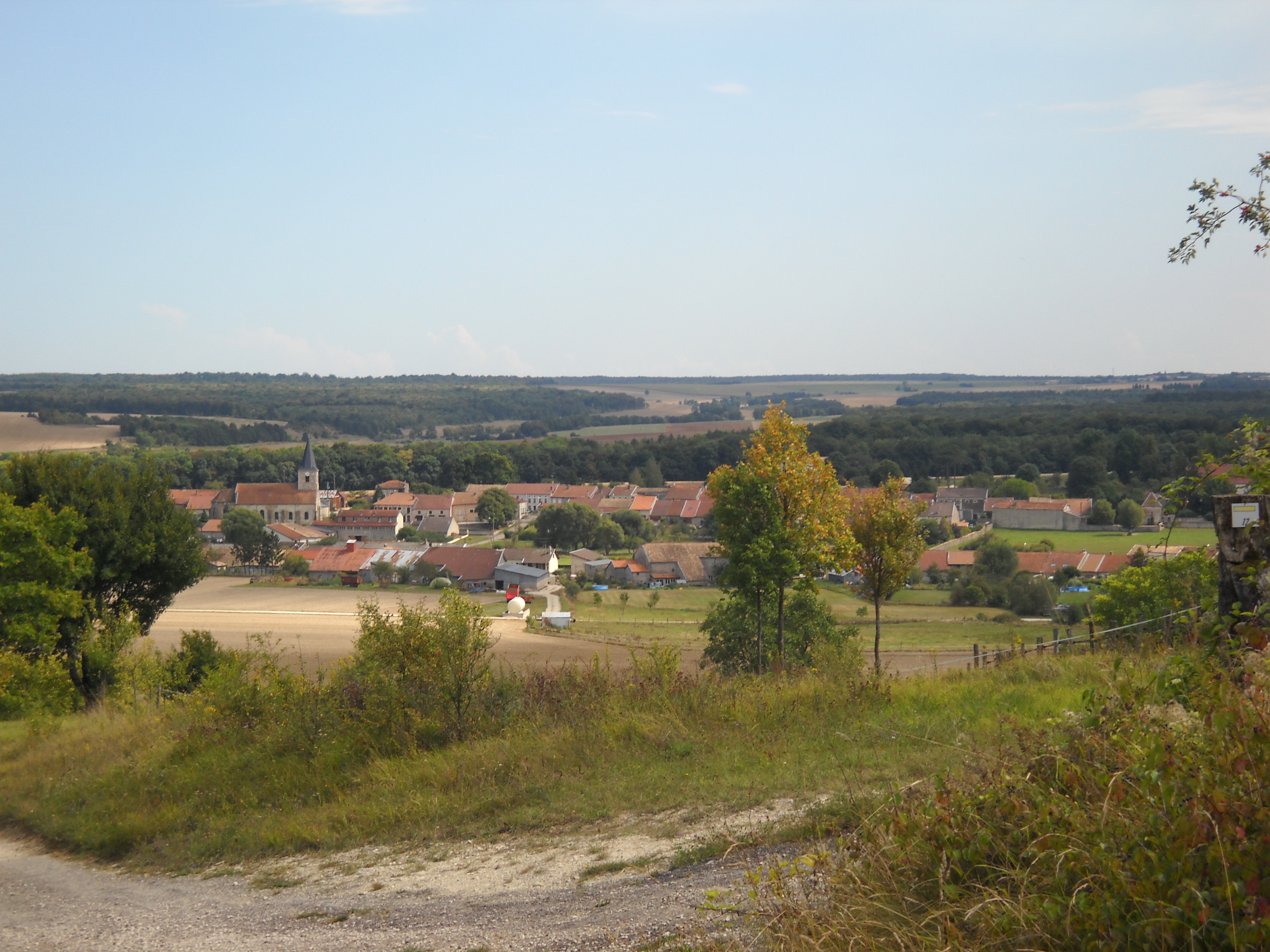
- A general view of Mauvages

- Coat of arms
- Location of Mauvages
- Location within France Location within Grand Est
- Coordinates: 48°35′43″N 5°33′19″E
- Country: France
- Region: Grand Est
- Department: Meuse
- Arrondissement: Commercy
- Canton: Ligny-en-Barrois

Government
  - Mayor (2020–2026): Pierre-Alexandre Dabit
- Area^{1}: 21.11 km^{2} (8.15 sq mi)
- Elevation: 299 m (981 ft)
- Highest elevation: 402 m (1,319 ft)
- Lowest elevation: 275 m (902 ft)
- Population (2023): 236
  - Density: 11.2/km^{2} (29.0/sq mi)
- Time zone: UTC+01:00 (CET)
  - Summer (DST): UTC+02:00 (CEST)
- INSEE/Postal code: 55327 /55190
- ^{1} French Land Register data, which excludes lakes, ponds, glaciers > 1 km^{2} (0.386 sq mi or 247 acres) and river estuaries.

Mauvages (French pronunciation: [movaʒ]) is a commune in the Meuse department in Grand Est in north-eastern France.

== History ==
The name Mauvages, mentioned for the first time in 1011 as Malvagia, is thought to come from malva, a plant that used to grow in abundance in the Mauvages area. In the 8th century, Pepin the Short gave the land of Mauvages to the Abbey of Gorze. The village was devastated by the Swedish during the Thirty Years War. It is located in the valley of the Meholle, on the watershed between the Meuse and Seine basins. Demography In 1793, Mauvages had 685 inhabitants. The population was stable as 783 villagers were listed in 1851. A decline began in the early 20th century, seeing the population fall from 612 inhabitants in 1901 to 286 in 2017.

=== Heritage ===
Mauvages is a distinctive village with a rich and diverse heritage. The chapel dedicated to Notre-Dame de Bonne Esperance, also known as the Hermitage of the Visitation, was built in the 13th century. The Romanesque church was built during the same period. Its beautiful limestone portal and altarpiece are listed as historic monuments. Mauvages also boasts plenty of other interesting features thanks to around fifteen fountains and three wash houses. The du Deo fountain and wash house built in 1831 and listed as a historic monument, reveals an Egyptian influence often found in the 19th century as a legacy of Napoleon's campaign in Egypt. The Mauvages tunnel, also known as "La Voute", is an astonishing building. Built between 1842 and 1847 by primarily manual means, it was an epic project. The tunnel allows boats on the Marne Rhine canal to reach Demange-aux-Eaux along an underground route stretching 4886 metres, making it one of the longest in Europe. The wayside cross, also known as the croix du Viree, dating from the 19th Century, was designed by the architect Verneau from Commercy; it consists of a straight pedestal topped with a pyramid shaft. The chateau was built in 1704 on the site of an earlier fortification. All that remains today is the main building, the gateway, some outbuildings and a tower with a cannon port. The town hall and school occupy the main building of an 18th-century farm that was converted between 1832 and 1836. The monument to the fallen of the commune was inaugurated on the 16 May 1920 under the presidency of Monsieur Grosdidier, a local senator. It pays tribute to ten local people who died for France in the First World War, as well as four soldiers who fell during the Second World War. In the church, a stained glass window by A. Schmidt-Besch and donated by the victims of the families of the Great War, depicts Christ as a dying soldier wrapped in the Tricolore flag that becomes his shroud. A plaque commemorates the names of the soldiers who died on the battlefield.

=== During the 1914-1918 war ===
The inhabitants of Mauvages responded to the general mobilization in August 1914. Village life was dictated by the Great War but it was not subject to any damage. In early July 1917, the commune of Mauvages welcomed American troops of the American Expeditionary Force (AEF) commanded by General Pershing. A training camp was set up in the commune. The railway line that passes near Mauvages played an important role in supplying the front. A hospital for victims of non-life-threatening injuries was set up in the commune. The region was also home to the headquarters of an engineering regiment and the command post of an artillery brigade. The American troops trained in cannon and howitzer firing, as well as grenade launching near the village. They were instructed by a company of the 52nd Battalion of Alpine Hunters of the 47th French division. Recreation and support for the US soldiers was provided by a branch of YMCA. The population lived on American time.

=== After the Great War ===
Despite the heroic fighting of the French army, the commune of Mauvages was occupied during the Second World War from 17 June 1940. - on 16 June 1940, the 332nd French infantry Regiment was deployed to Void to defend the Marne Rhine canal - from 16 to 17 June, fighting took place between Mauvages and Rosieres-en-Blois, On the morning of 18 June, after a night in the woods between Rosieres and Badonvilliers, the regiment fell into German hands. The men were sent to Gondrecourt-Le-Chateau then imprisoned in Germany (stalag XII A). Liberated on 31 August 1944, the commune returned to a peaceful rural existence. A stele to commemorate the Second World War was erected at the edge of the village towards Rosieres-en-Blois. It is inscribed with the names of eight French soldiers. Activity resumed on the Marne Rhine canal. The pulling of barges has evolved over the years, from men to animals and then to electric rail tractors since 1936.

== Gallery ==
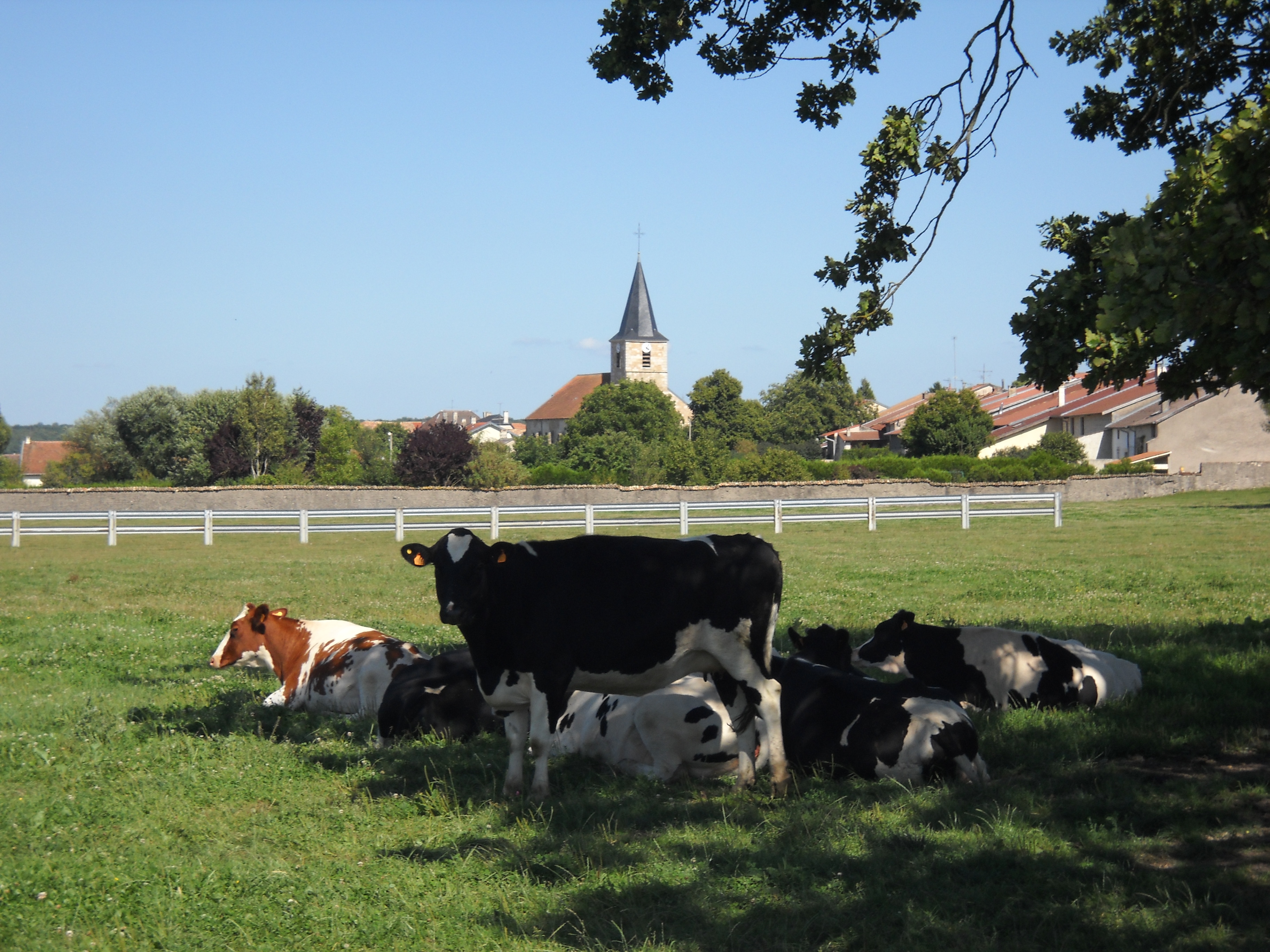
Stockbreeding

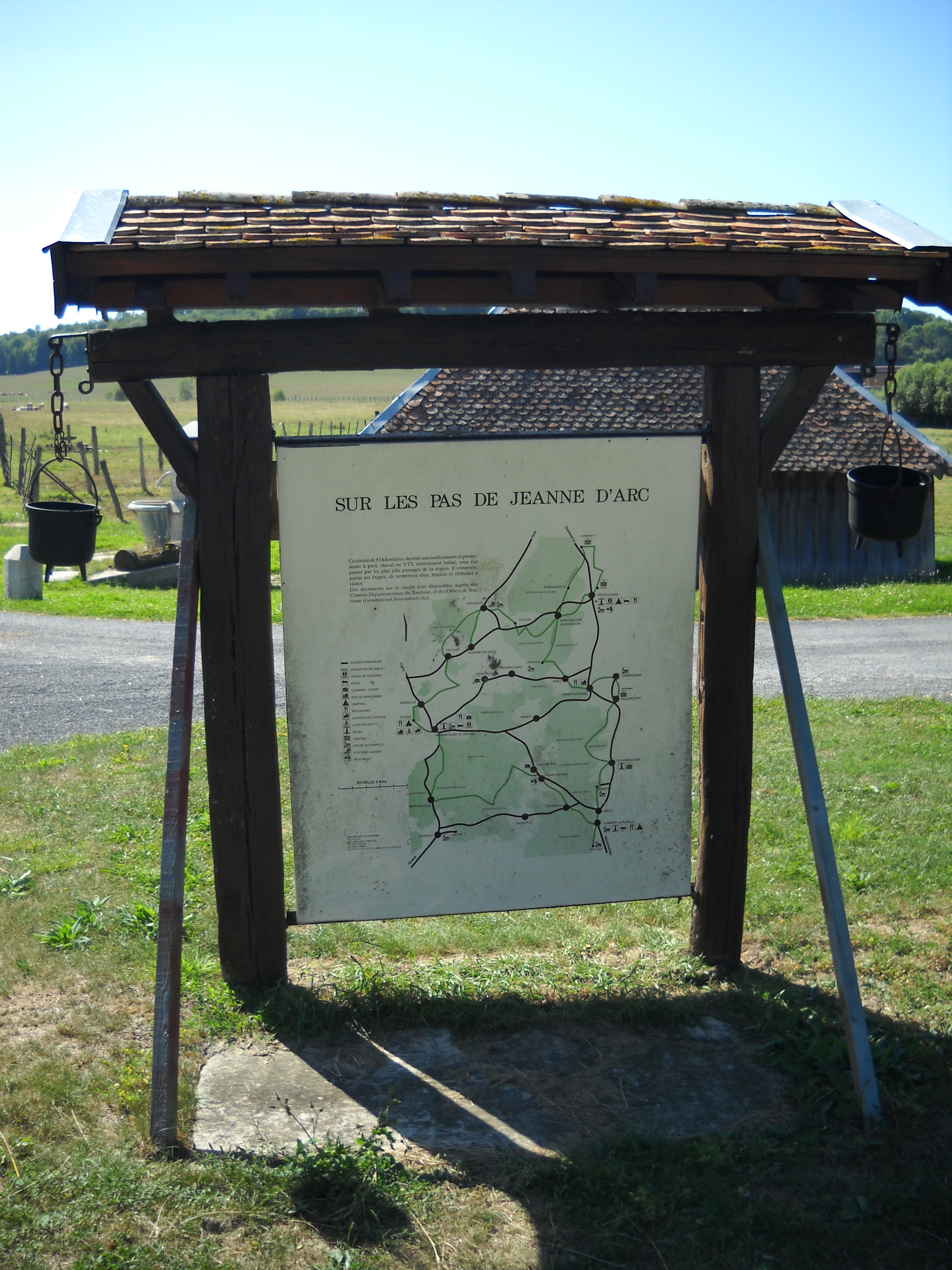
Hiking map

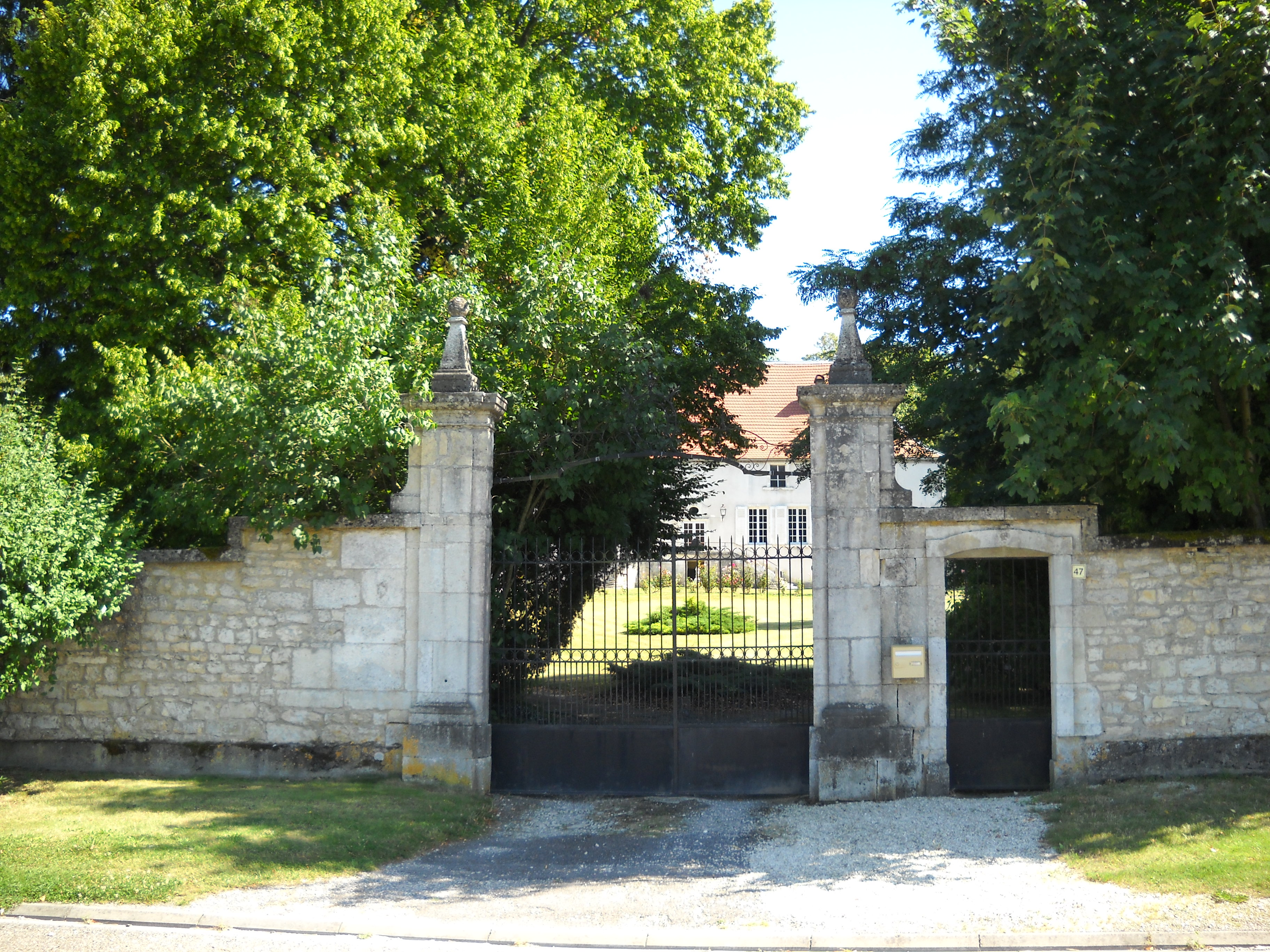
Insight of the castle

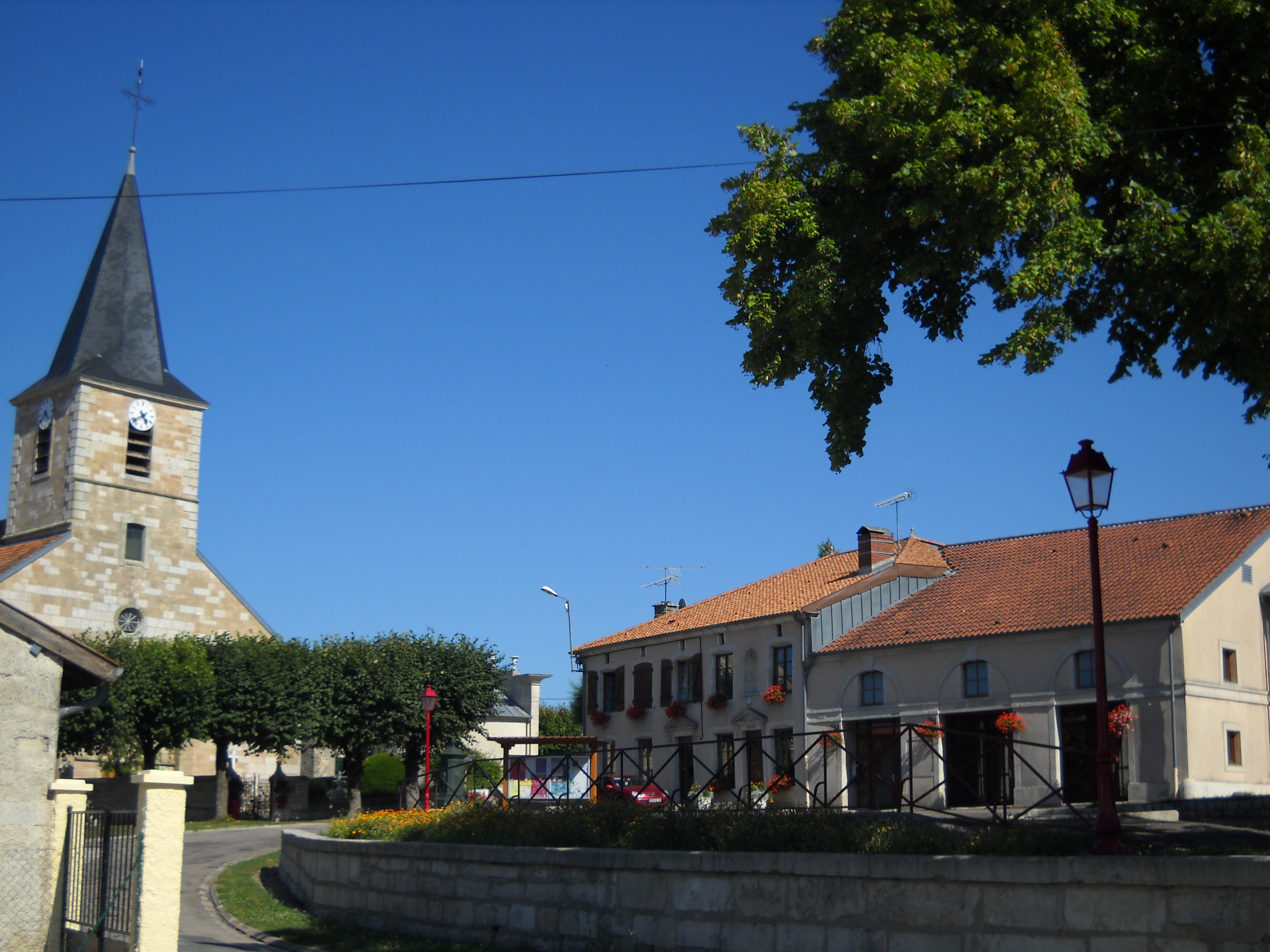
Square of the village

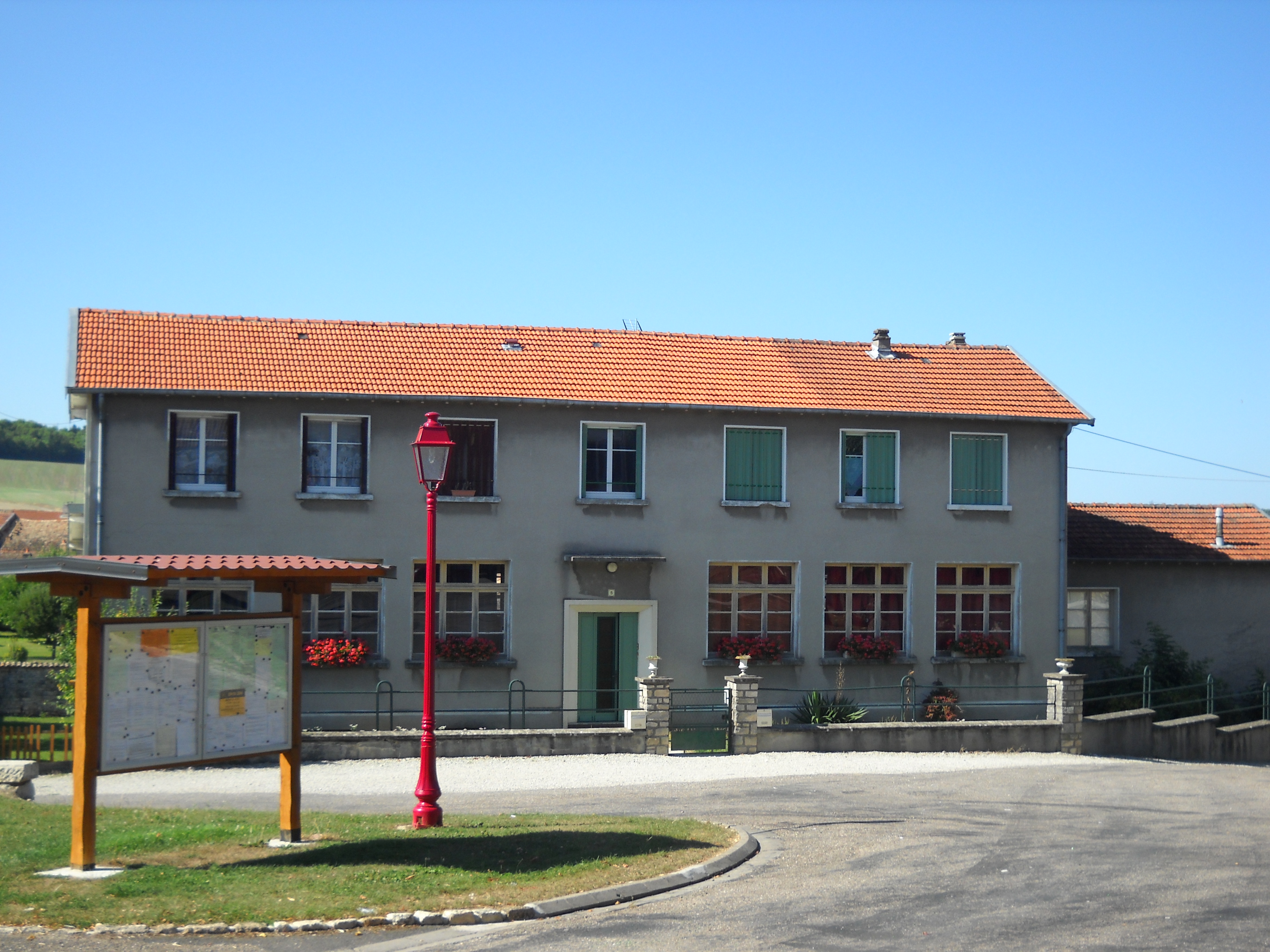
School of Mauvages

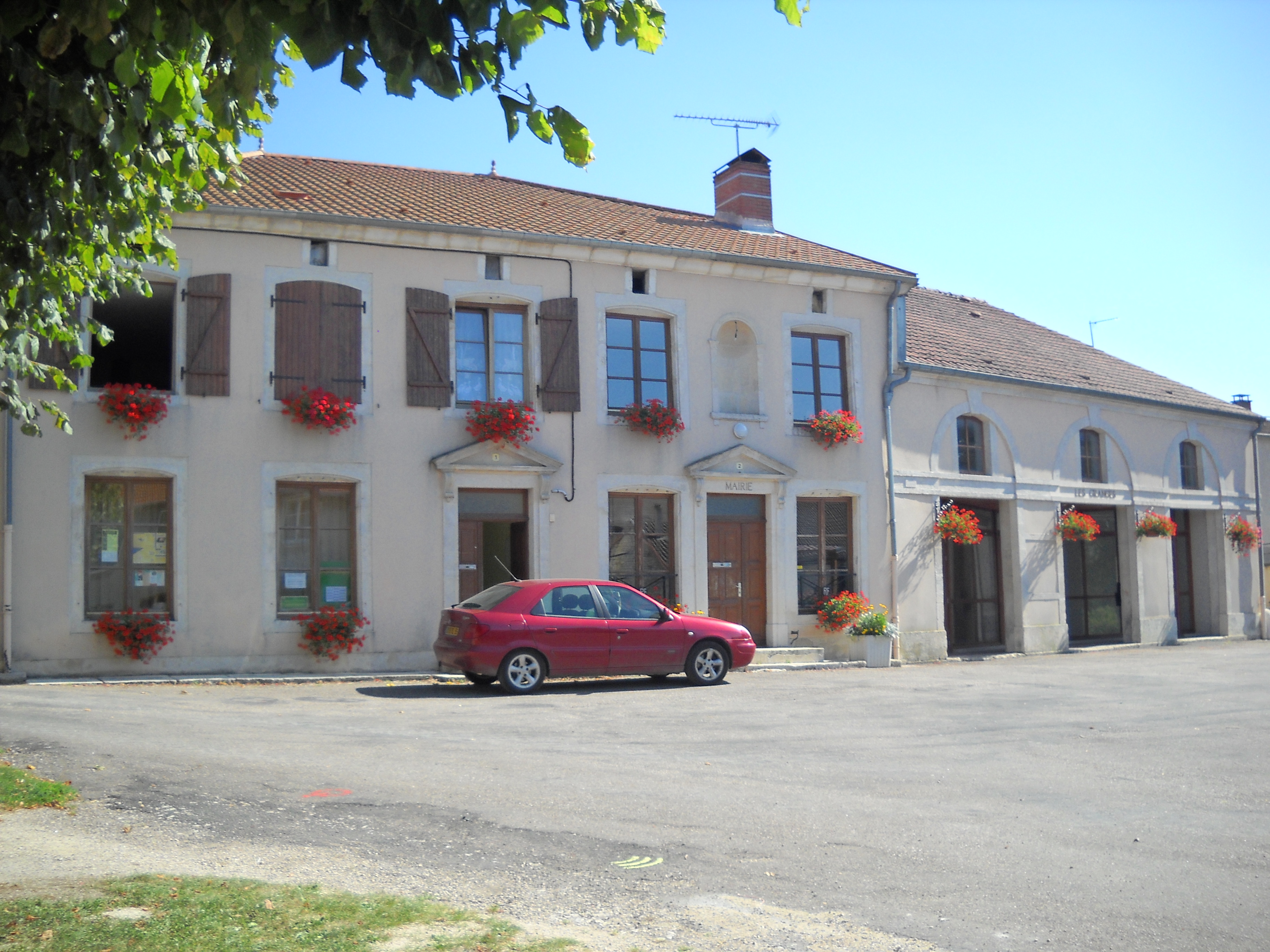
Town Hall of Mauvages and village hall

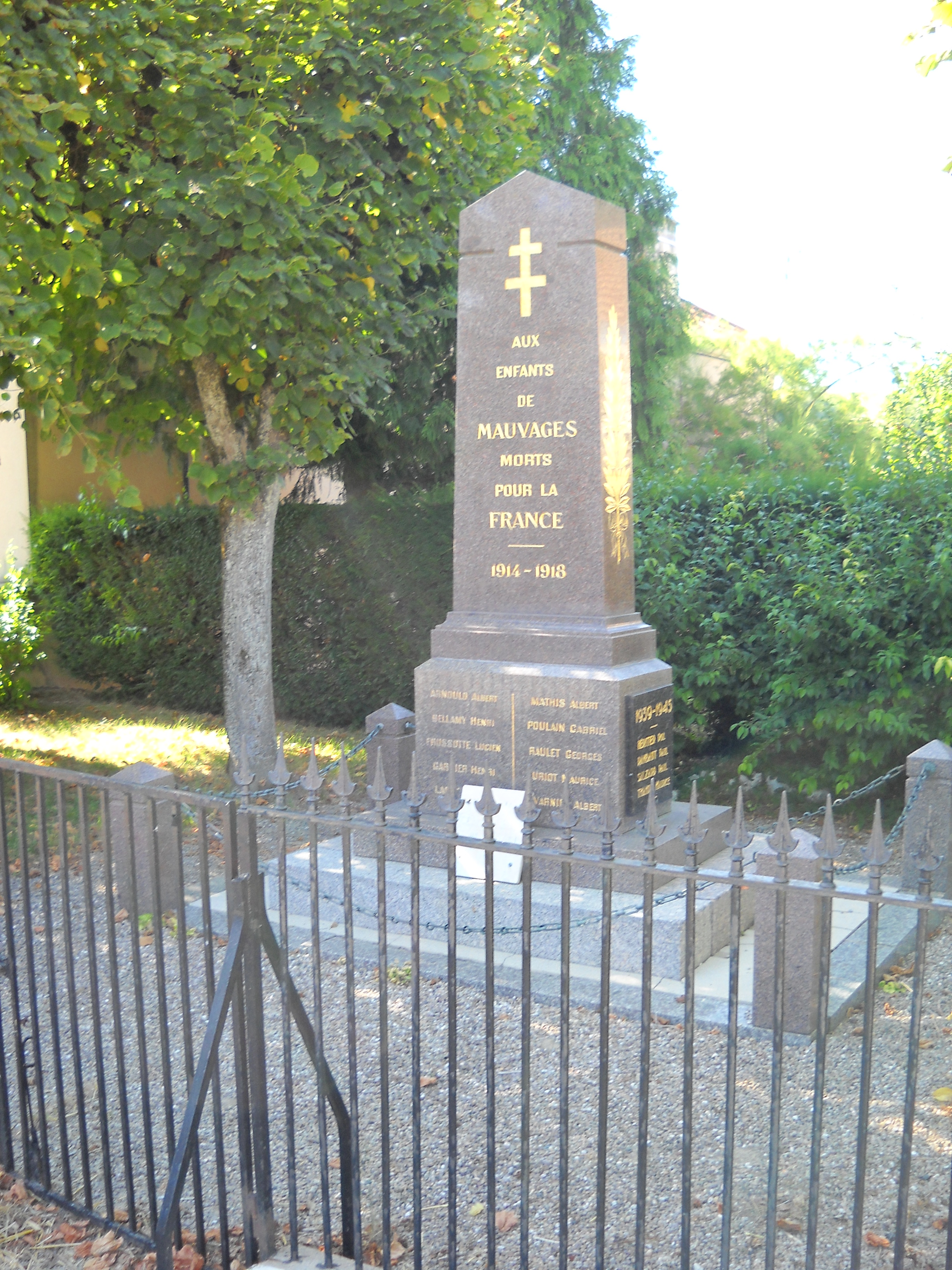
War memorial

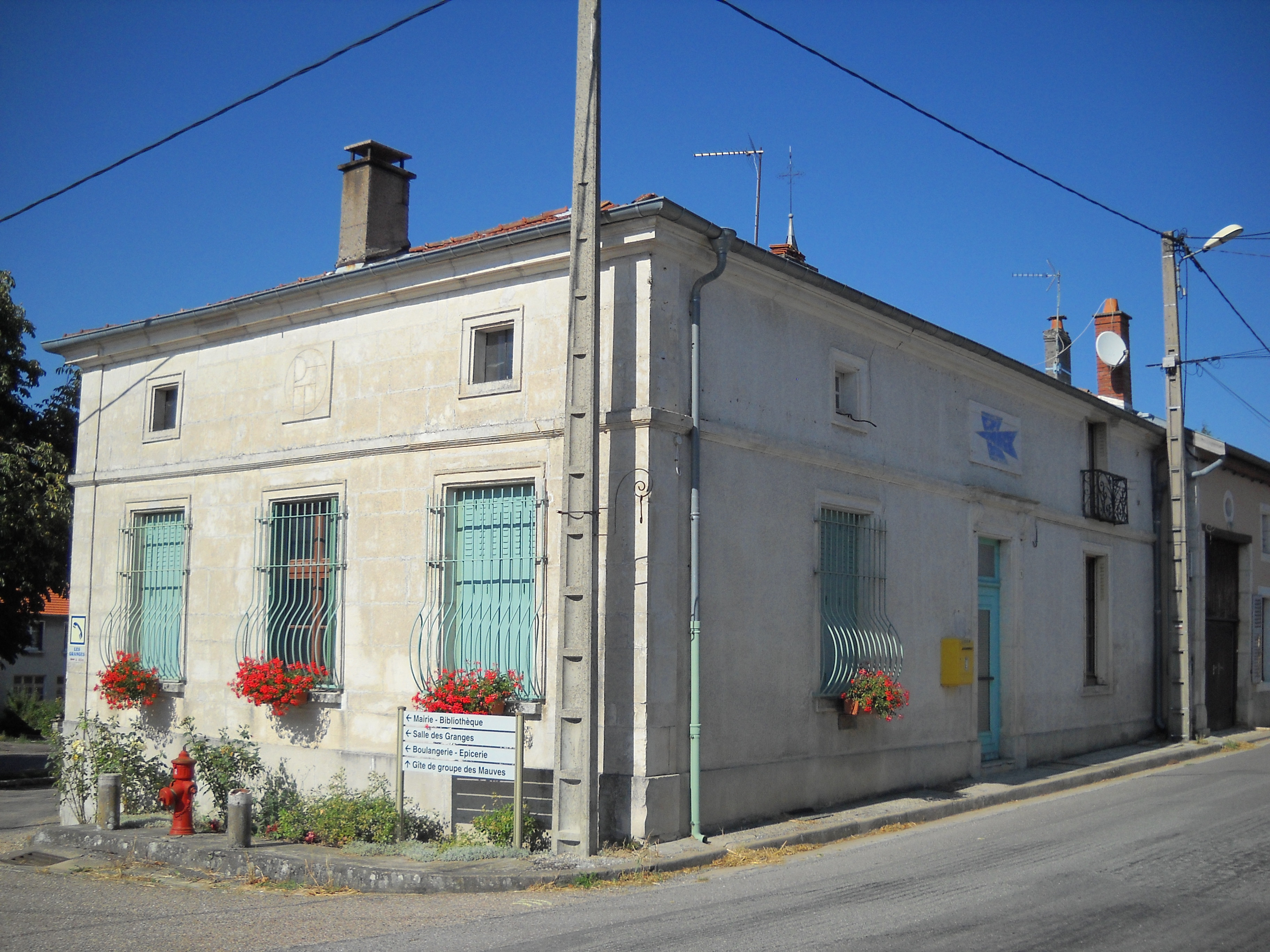
Old post office

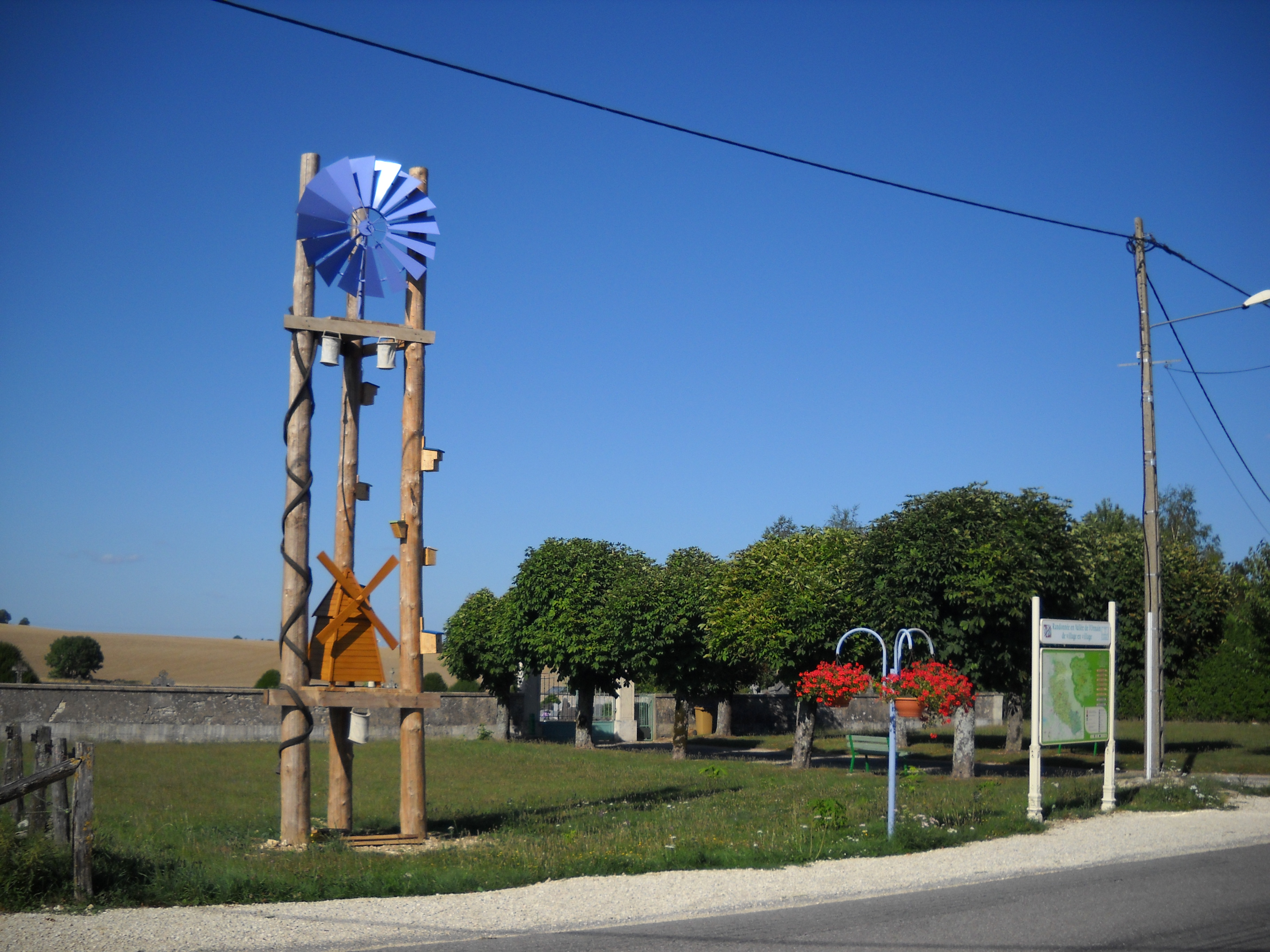
Entrance of the village and graveyard

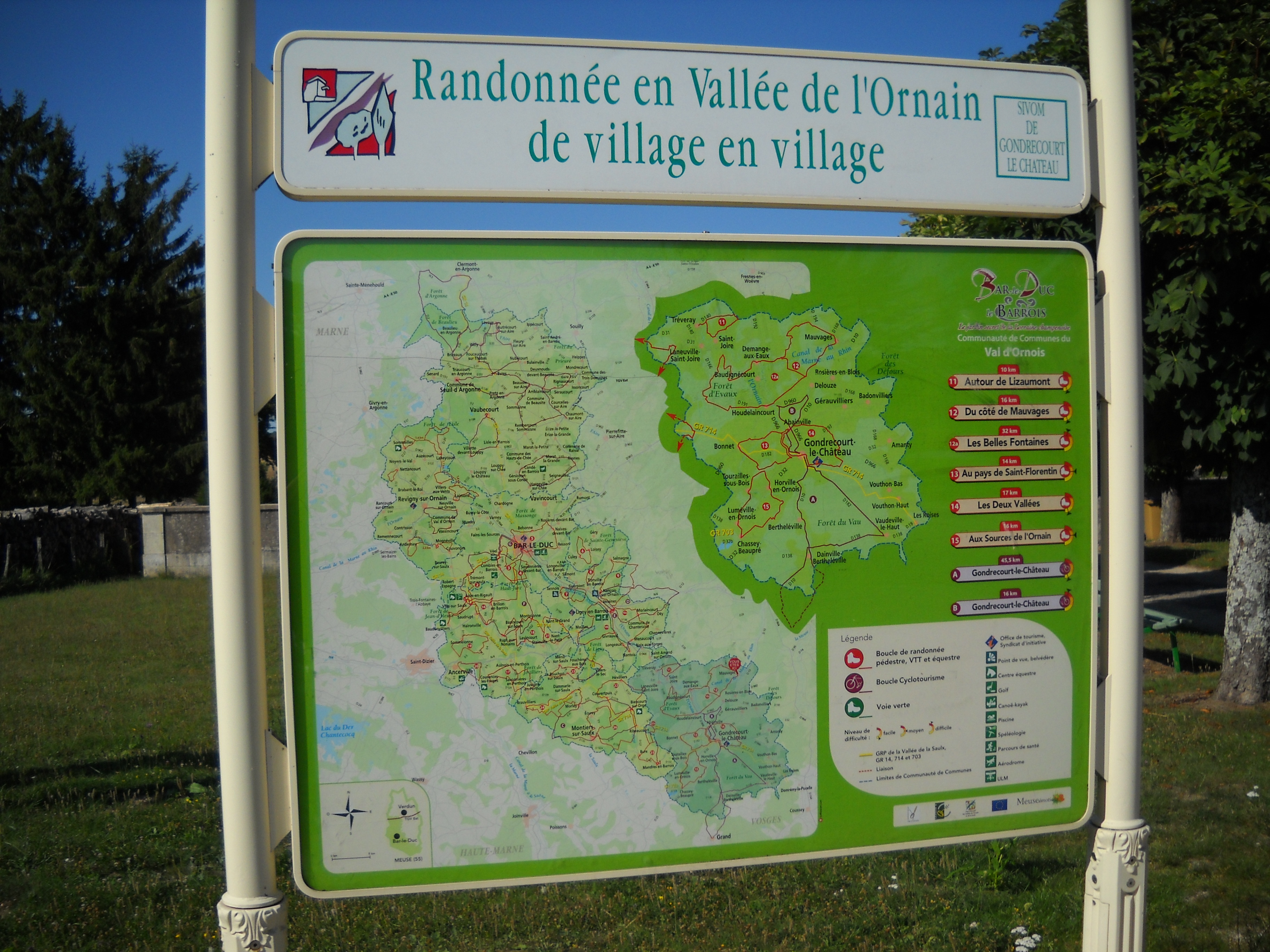
Hiking map at the entrance of the village

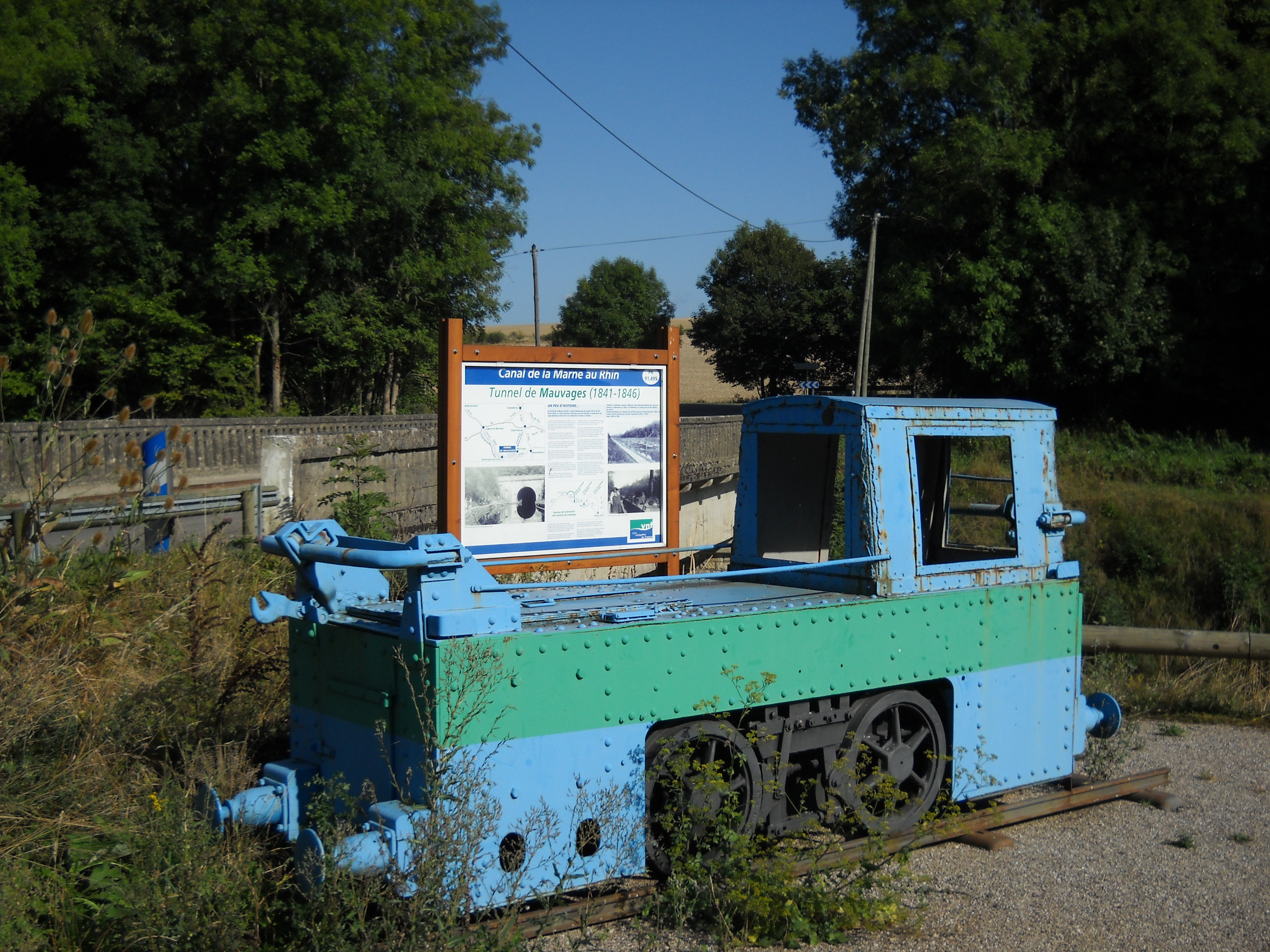
Memorial of the tunnel of the Marne-Rhine canal

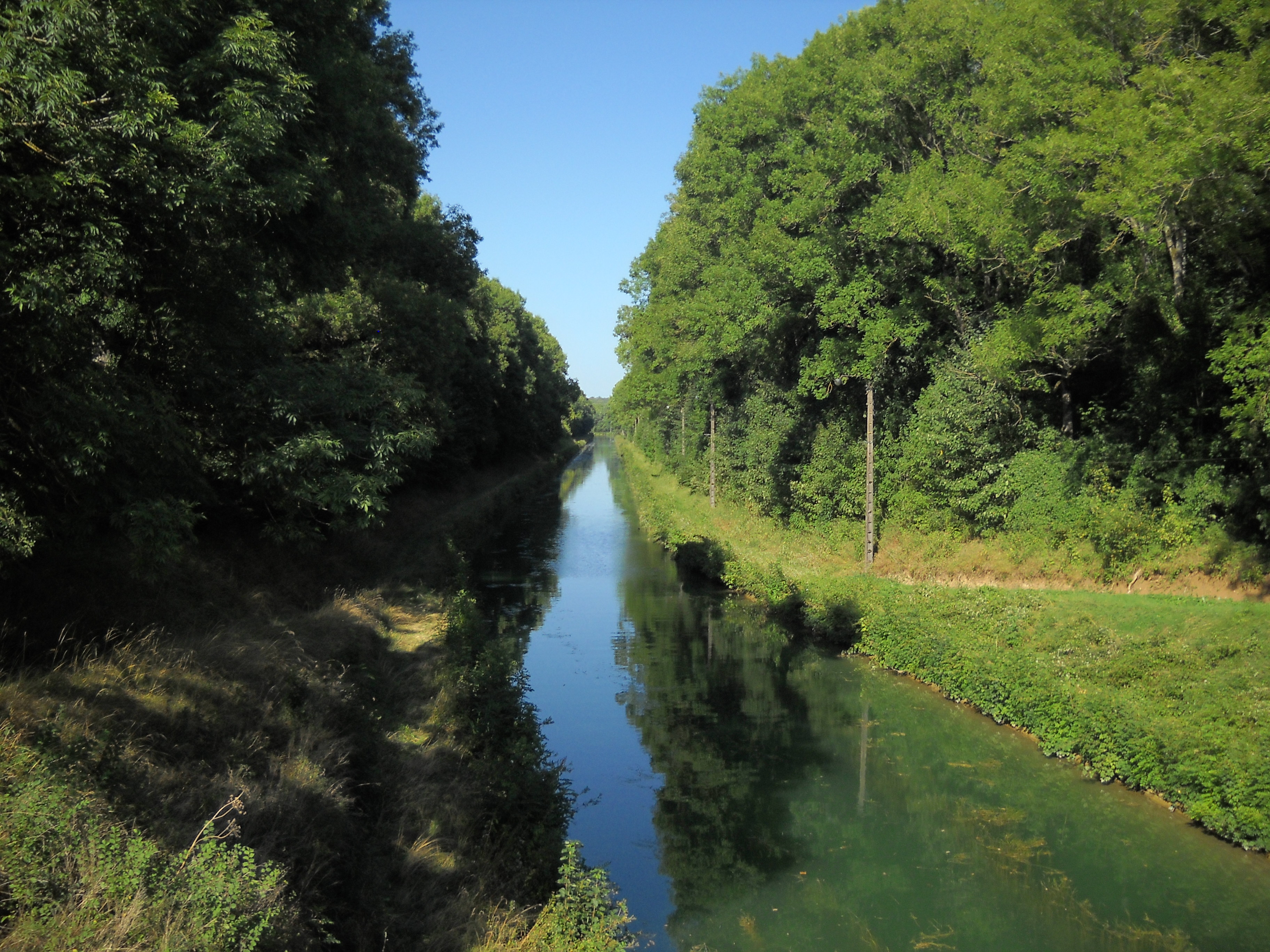
Marne-Rhine canal

== See also ==
- Communes of the Meuse department
