= Dainville-Bertheléville =

- Commune
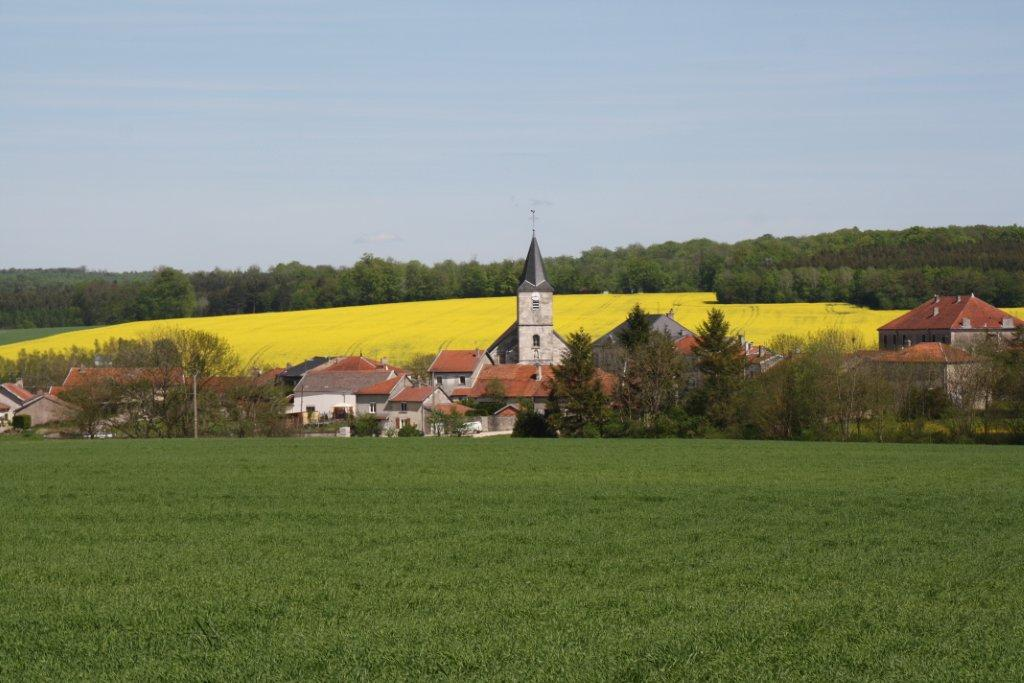
- A general view of Dainville-Bertheléville

- Coat of arms
- Location of Dainville-Bertheléville
- Location within France Location within Grand Est
- Coordinates: 48°26′30″N 5°30′37″E
- Country: France
- Region: Grand Est
- Department: Meuse
- Arrondissement: Commercy
- Canton: Ligny-en-Barrois
- Intercommunality: Portes de Meuse

Government
  - Mayor (2022–2026): Pascal Perrin
- Area^{1}: 40.3 km^{2} (15.6 sq mi)
- Elevation: 350 m (1,150 ft)
- Highest elevation: 441 m (1,447 ft)
- Lowest elevation: 302 m (991 ft)
- Population (2023): 120
  - Density: 3.0/km^{2} (7.7/sq mi)
- Time zone: UTC+01:00 (CET)
  - Summer (DST): UTC+02:00 (CEST)
- INSEE/Postal code: 55142 /55130
- ^{1} French Land Register data, which excludes lakes, ponds, glaciers > 1 km^{2} (0.386 sq mi or 247 acres) and river estuaries.

Dainville-Bertheléville (French pronunciation: [dɛ̃vil bɛʁtəlevil]) is a commune in the Meuse department in Grand Est in north-eastern France.

== Population ==
Historical population
Year	Pop.	±% p.a.
1968	305	—
1975	204	−5.58%
1982	152	−4.12%
1990	138	−1.20%
1999	139	+0.08%
2007	154	+1.29%
2012	160	+0.77%
2017	116	−6.23%
2023	120	+0.57%
Source: INSEE

== See also ==
- Communes of the Meuse department
