= Vouthon-Haut =

- Commune
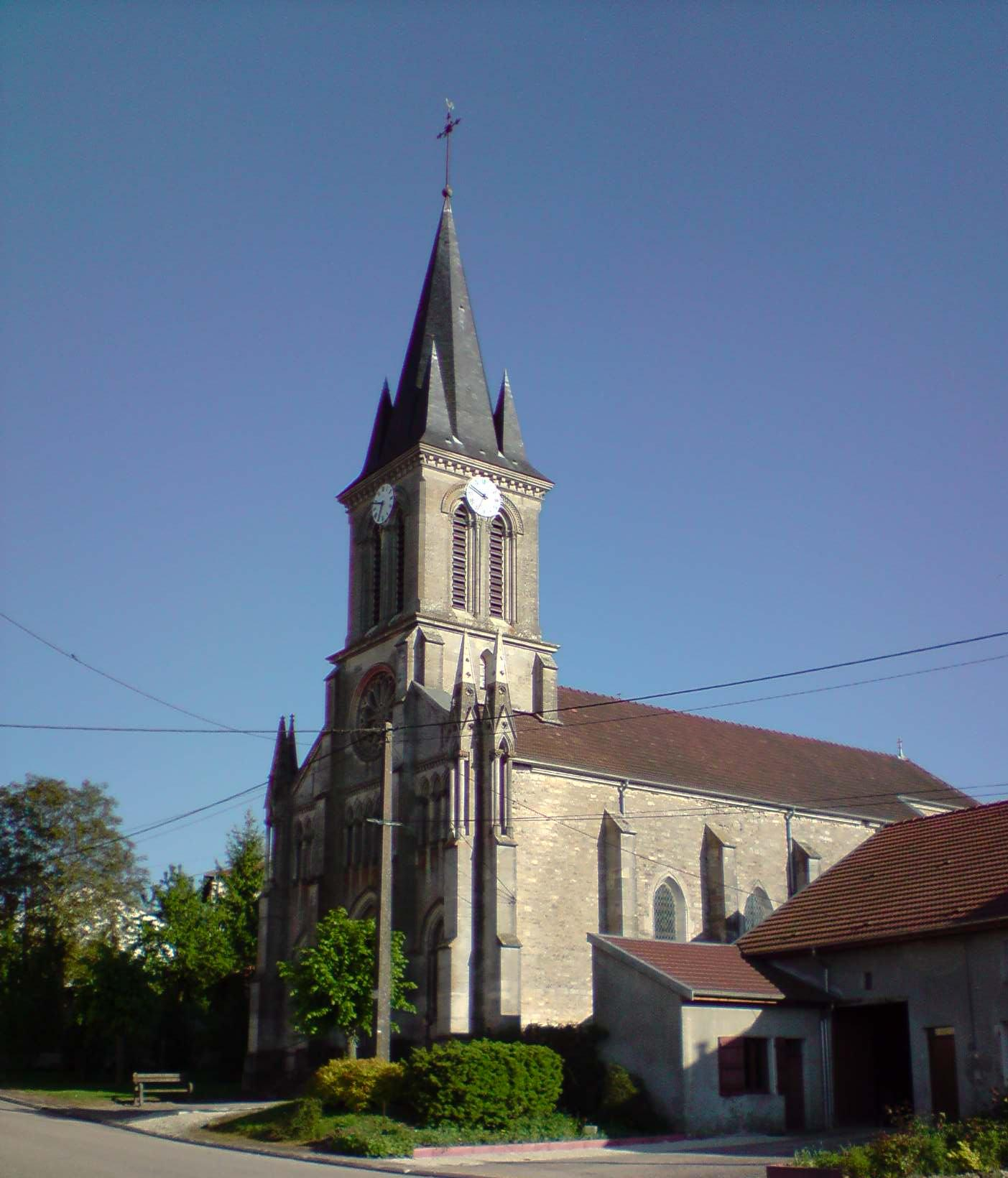
- The church in Vouthon-Haut

- Coat of arms
- Location of Vouthon-Haut
- Location within France Location within Grand Est
- Coordinates: 48°28′39″N 5°37′05″E
- Country: France
- Region: Grand Est
- Department: Meuse
- Arrondissement: Commercy
- Canton: Ligny-en-Barrois
- Intercommunality: Portes de Meuse

Government
  - Mayor (2020–2026): Gilles Mourot
- Area^{1}: 13.23 km^{2} (5.11 sq mi)
- Elevation: 410 m (1,350 ft)
- Highest elevation: 441 m (1,447 ft)
- Lowest elevation: 308 m (1,010 ft)
- Population (2023): 73
  - Density: 5.5/km^{2} (14/sq mi)
- Time zone: UTC+01:00 (CET)
  - Summer (DST): UTC+02:00 (CEST)
- INSEE/Postal code: 55575 /55130
- ^{1} French Land Register data, which excludes lakes, ponds, glaciers > 1 km^{2} (0.386 sq mi or 247 acres) and river estuaries.

Vouthon-Haut (French pronunciation: [vutɔ̃ o]) is a commune in the Meuse department in Grand Est in north-eastern France.

== See also ==
- Communes of the Meuse department
