= Houdelaincourt =

- Commune
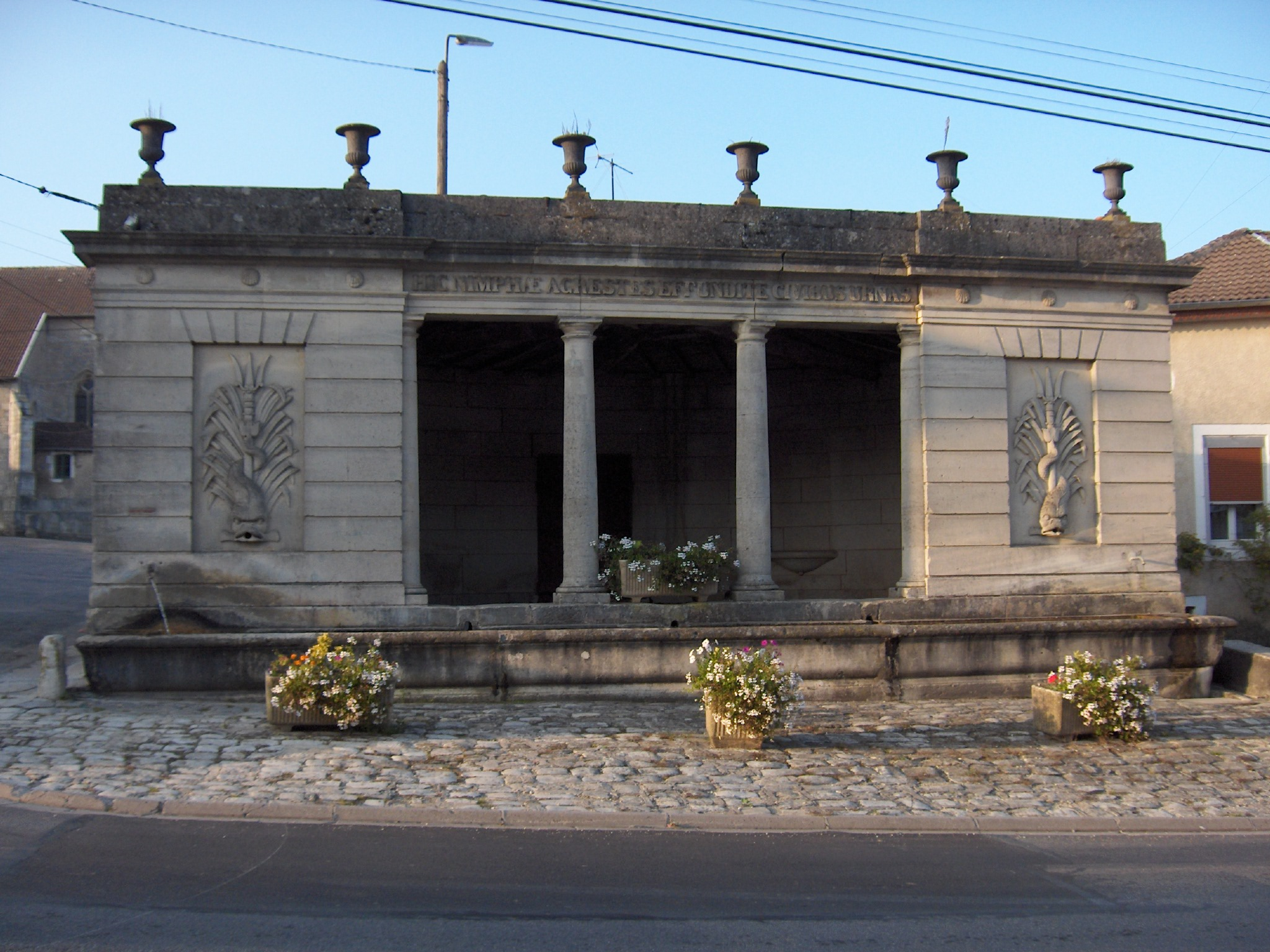
- The wash house in Houdelaincourt

- Coat of arms
- Location of Houdelaincourt
- Location within France Location within Grand Est
- Coordinates: 48°32′58″N 5°28′26″E
- Country: France
- Region: Grand Est
- Department: Meuse
- Arrondissement: Commercy
- Canton: Ligny-en-Barrois

Government
  - Mayor (2020–2026): Rémy Bour
- Area^{1}: 16.07 km^{2} (6.20 sq mi)
- Elevation: 300 m (980 ft)
- Highest elevation: 402 m (1,319 ft)
- Lowest elevation: 277 m (909 ft)
- Population (2023): 281
  - Density: 17.5/km^{2} (45.3/sq mi)
- Time zone: UTC+01:00 (CET)
  - Summer (DST): UTC+02:00 (CEST)
- INSEE/Postal code: 55248 /55130
- ^{1} French Land Register data, which excludes lakes, ponds, glaciers > 1 km^{2} (0.386 sq mi or 247 acres) and river estuaries.

Houdelaincourt (French pronunciation: [udlɛ̃kuʁ]) is a commune in the Meuse department in Grand Est in north-eastern France.

== See also ==
- Communes of the Meuse department
