= Badonvilliers-Gérauvilliers =

- Commune
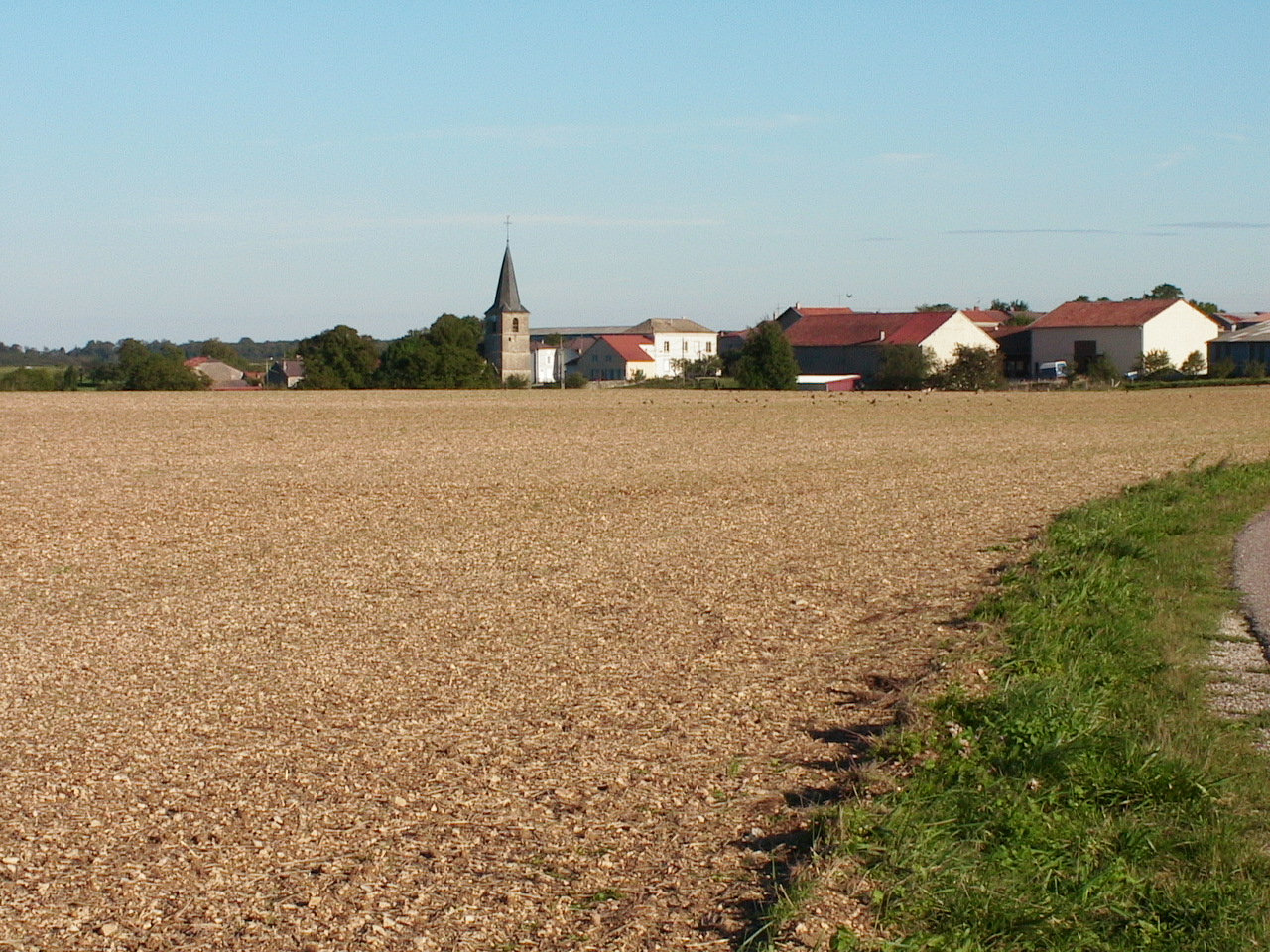
- A general view of Badonvilliers

- Coat of arms
- Location of Badonvilliers-Gérauvilliers
- Location within France Location within Grand Est
- Coordinates: 48°33′02″N 5°35′11″E
- Country: France
- Region: Grand Est
- Department: Meuse
- Arrondissement: Commercy
- Canton: Ligny-en-Barrois

Government
  - Mayor (2020–2026): Jean-Pierre Marquelet
- Area^{1}: 21.03 km^{2} (8.12 sq mi)
- Elevation: 415 m (1,362 ft)
- Highest elevation: 401 m (1,316 ft)
- Lowest elevation: 309 m (1,014 ft)
- Population (2023): 126
  - Density: 5.99/km^{2} (15.5/sq mi)
- Time zone: UTC+01:00 (CET)
  - Summer (DST): UTC+02:00 (CEST)
- INSEE/Postal code: 55026 /55130
- ^{1} French Land Register data, which excludes lakes, ponds, glaciers > 1 km^{2} (0.386 sq mi or 247 acres) and river estuaries.

Badonvilliers-Gérauvilliers (French pronunciation: [badɔ̃vilje ʒeʁovilje]) is a commune in the Meuse department in the Grand Est region in northeastern France. It was created in 1973 by the merger of two former communes: Badonvilliers and Gérauvilliers.

== Population ==
Historical population
Year	Pop.	±% p.a.
1968	182	—
1975	160	−1.82%
1982	125	−3.47%
1990	126	+0.10%
1999	131	+0.43%
2007	160	+2.53%
2012	141	−2.50%
2017	138	−0.43%
2023	126	−1.50%
Source: INSEE

== See also ==
- Communes of the Meuse department
