= Horville-en-Ornois =

- Commune
- Coat of arms
- Location of Horville-en-Ornois
- Location within France Location within Grand Est
- Coordinates: 48°29′30″N 5°28′04″E
- Country: France
- Region: Grand Est
- Department: Meuse
- Arrondissement: Commercy
- Canton: Ligny-en-Barrois

Government
  - Mayor (2020–2026): Claude Francois
- Area^{1}: 7.62 km^{2} (2.94 sq mi)
- Elevation: 340 m (1,120 ft)
- Highest elevation: 390 m (1,280 ft)
- Lowest elevation: 301 m (988 ft)
- Population (2023): 45
  - Density: 5.9/km^{2} (15/sq mi)
- Time zone: UTC+01:00 (CET)
  - Summer (DST): UTC+02:00 (CEST)
- INSEE/Postal code: 55247 /55130
- ^{1} French Land Register data, which excludes lakes, ponds, glaciers > 1 km^{2} (0.386 sq mi or 247 acres) and river estuaries.

Horville-en-Ornois is a commune in the Meuse department in Grand Est in north-eastern France.

== See also ==
- Communes of the Meuse department
