= Saint-Joire =

- Commune
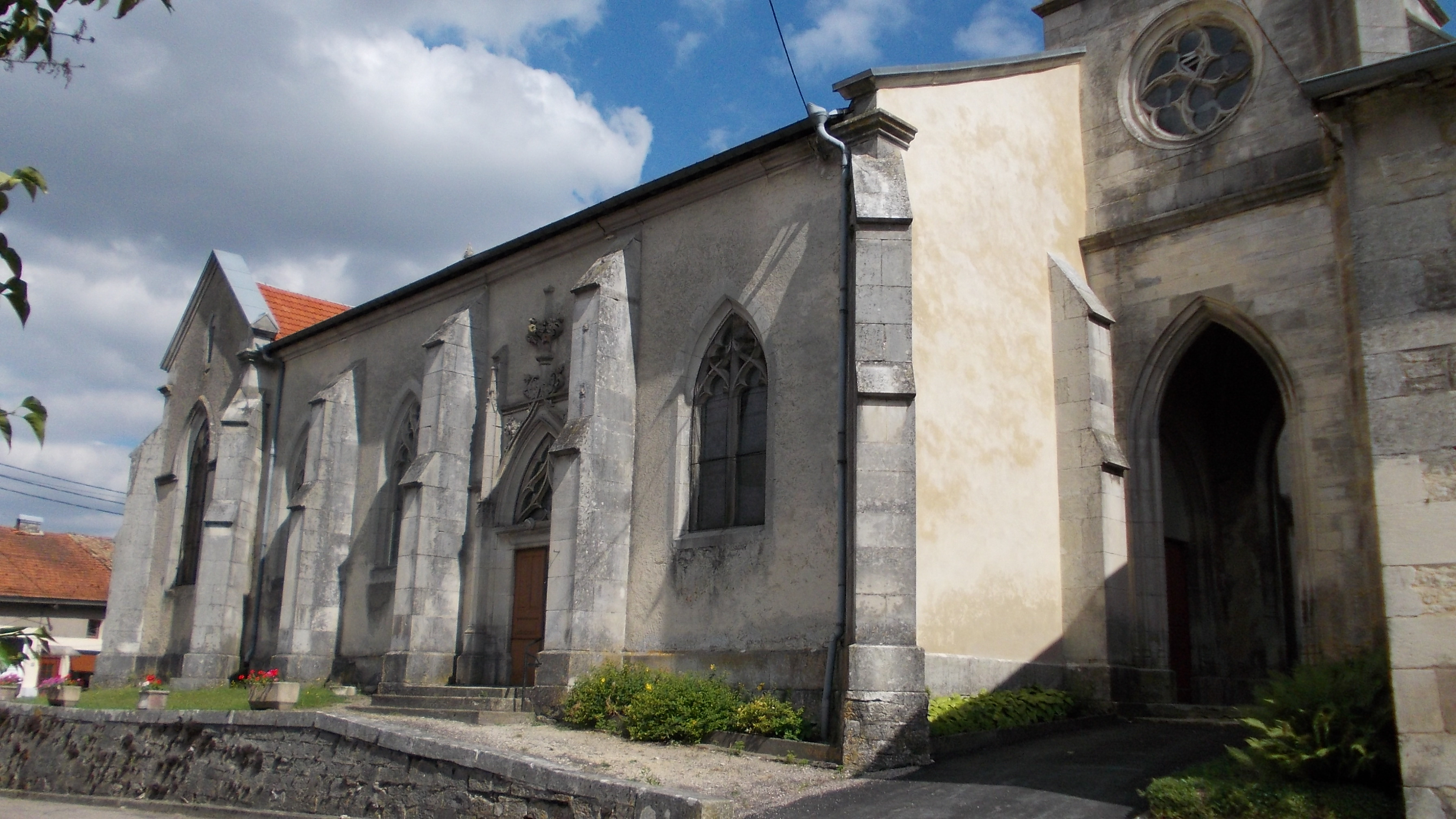
- The church in Saint-Joire

- Coat of arms
- Location of Saint-Joire
- Location within France Location within Grand Est
- Coordinates: 48°35′52″N 5°25′02″E
- Country: France
- Region: Grand Est
- Department: Meuse
- Arrondissement: Commercy
- Canton: Ligny-en-Barrois

Government
  - Mayor (2020–2026): Laurent Aubry
- Area^{1}: 18.32 km^{2} (7.07 sq mi)
- Elevation: 263 m (863 ft)
- Highest elevation: 385 m (1,263 ft)
- Lowest elevation: 257 m (843 ft)
- Population (2023): 230
  - Density: 13/km^{2} (33/sq mi)
- Time zone: UTC+01:00 (CET)
  - Summer (DST): UTC+02:00 (CEST)
- INSEE/Postal code: 55459 /55130
- ^{1} French Land Register data, which excludes lakes, ponds, glaciers > 1 km^{2} (0.386 sq mi or 247 acres) and river estuaries.

Saint-Joire (French pronunciation: [sɛ̃ ʒwaʁ]) is a commune in the Meuse department in Grand Est in north-eastern France.

== See also ==
- Communes of the Meuse department
