= Vaudeville-le-Haut =

- Commune
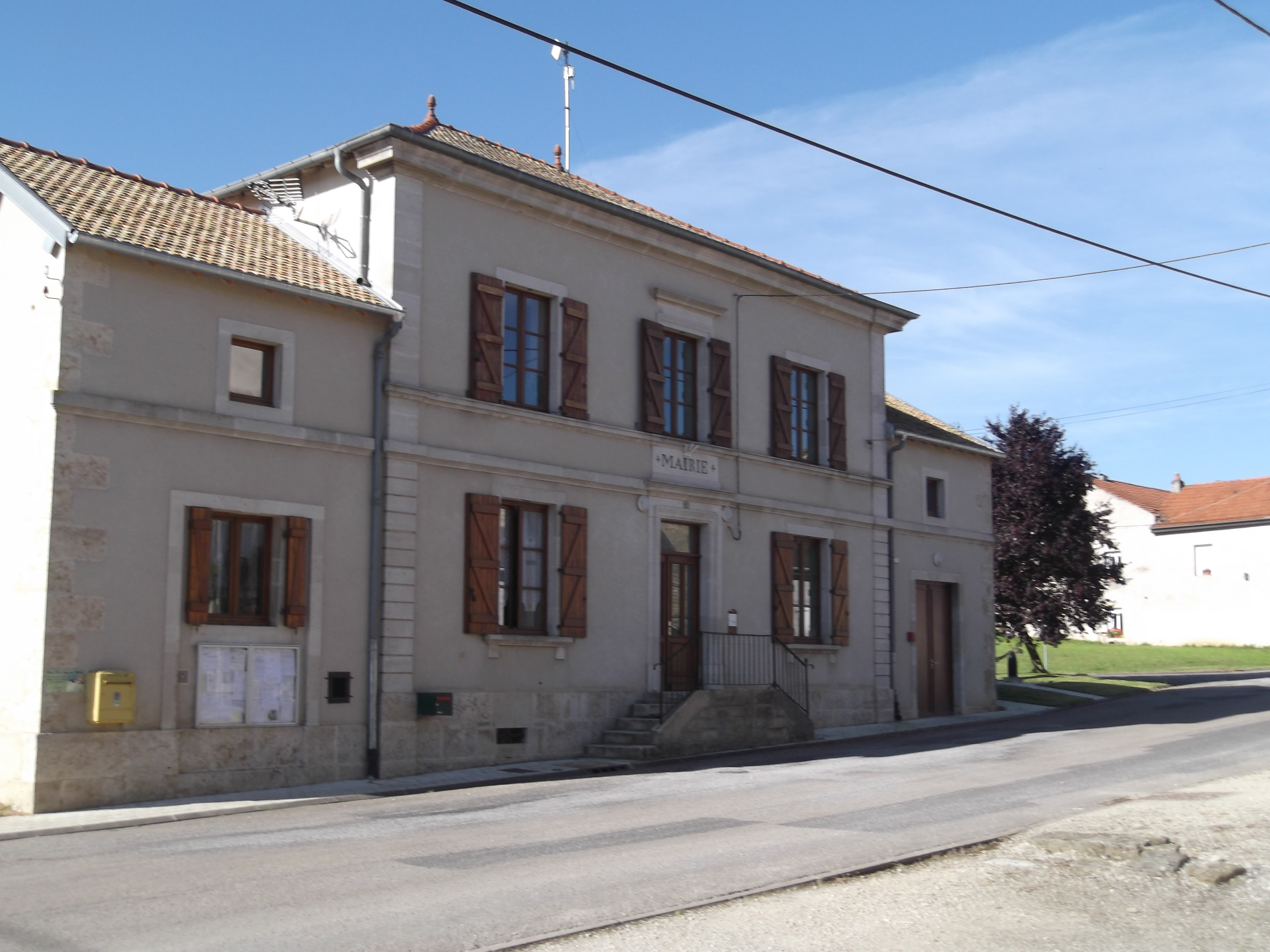
- The town hall in Vaudeville-le-Haut

- Coat of arms
- Location of Vaudeville-le-Haut
- Location within France Location within Grand Est
- Coordinates: 48°27′02″N 5°36′09″E
- Country: France
- Region: Grand Est
- Department: Meuse
- Arrondissement: Commercy
- Canton: Ligny-en-Barrois

Government
  - Mayor (2020–2026): Christian Leclerc
- Area^{1}: 9.71 km^{2} (3.75 sq mi)
- Elevation: 385 m (1,263 ft)
- Highest elevation: 451 m (1,480 ft)
- Lowest elevation: 300 m (980 ft)
- Population (2023): 46
  - Density: 4.7/km^{2} (12/sq mi)
- Time zone: UTC+01:00 (CET)
  - Summer (DST): UTC+02:00 (CEST)
- INSEE/Postal code: 55534 /55130
- ^{1} French Land Register data, which excludes lakes, ponds, glaciers > 1 km^{2} (0.386 sq mi or 247 acres) and river estuaries.

Vaudeville-le-Haut (French pronunciation: [vodvil lə o]) is a commune in the Meuse department in Grand Est in north-eastern France.

== See also ==
- Communes of the Meuse department
