= Chassey-Beaupré =

- Commune
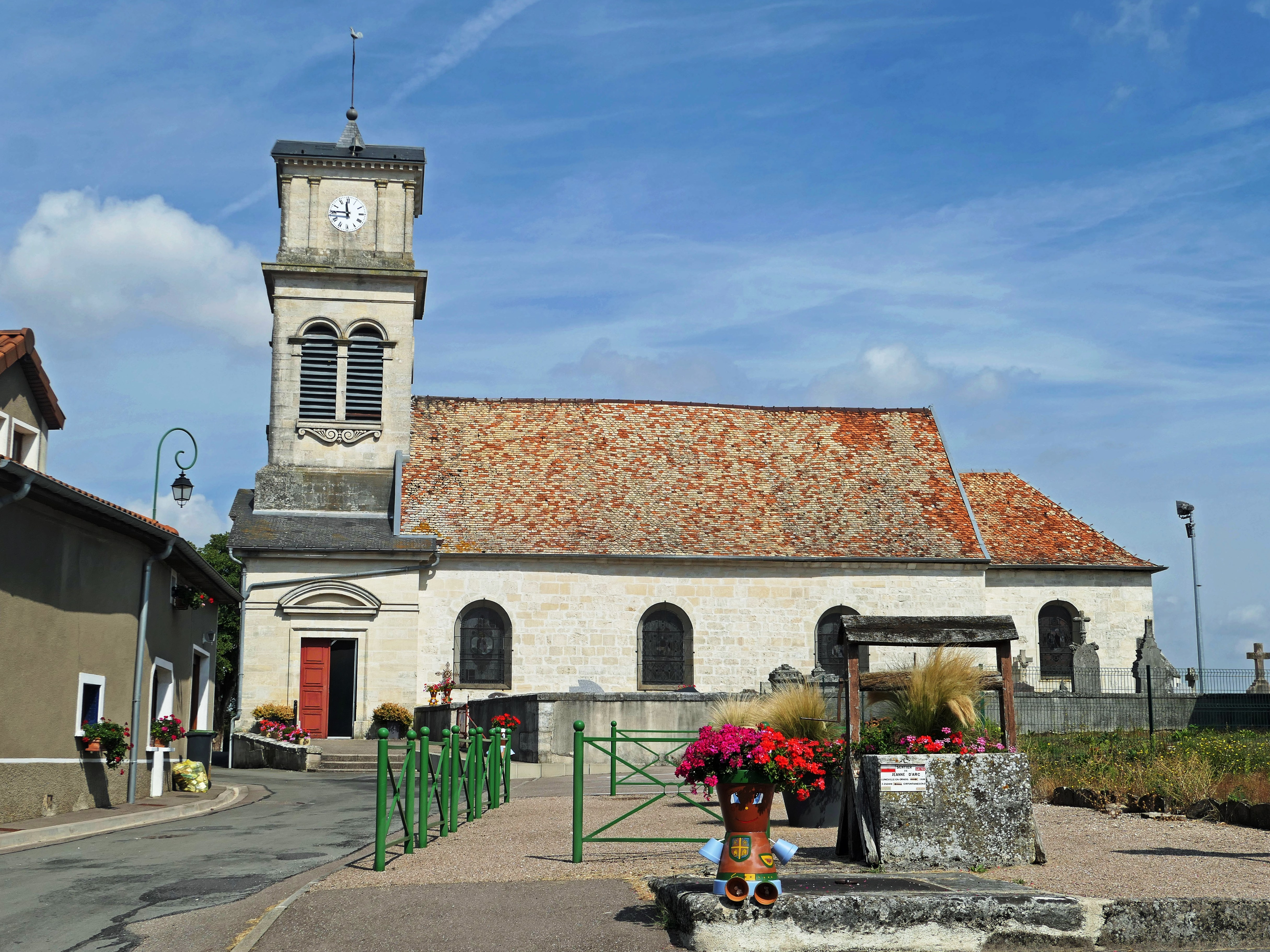

- Coat of arms
- Location of Chassey-Beaupré
- Location within France Location within Grand Est
- Coordinates: 48°27′34″N 5°25′58″E
- Country: France
- Region: Grand Est
- Department: Meuse
- Arrondissement: Commercy
- Canton: Ligny-en-Barrois

Government
  - Mayor (2020–2026): Armin Kennel
- Area^{1}: 14.11 km^{2} (5.45 sq mi)
- Elevation: 342 m (1,122 ft)
- Highest elevation: 413 m (1,355 ft)
- Lowest elevation: 315 m (1,033 ft)
- Population (2023): 94
  - Density: 6.7/km^{2} (17/sq mi)
- Time zone: UTC+01:00 (CET)
  - Summer (DST): UTC+02:00 (CEST)
- INSEE/Postal code: 55104 /55130
- ^{1} French Land Register data, which excludes lakes, ponds, glaciers > 1 km^{2} (0.386 sq mi or 247 acres) and river estuaries.

Chassey-Beaupré (French pronunciation: [ʃasɛ bopʁe]) is a commune in the Meuse department in Grand Est in north-eastern France.

== See also ==
- Communes of the Meuse department
