= Les Roises =

- Commune
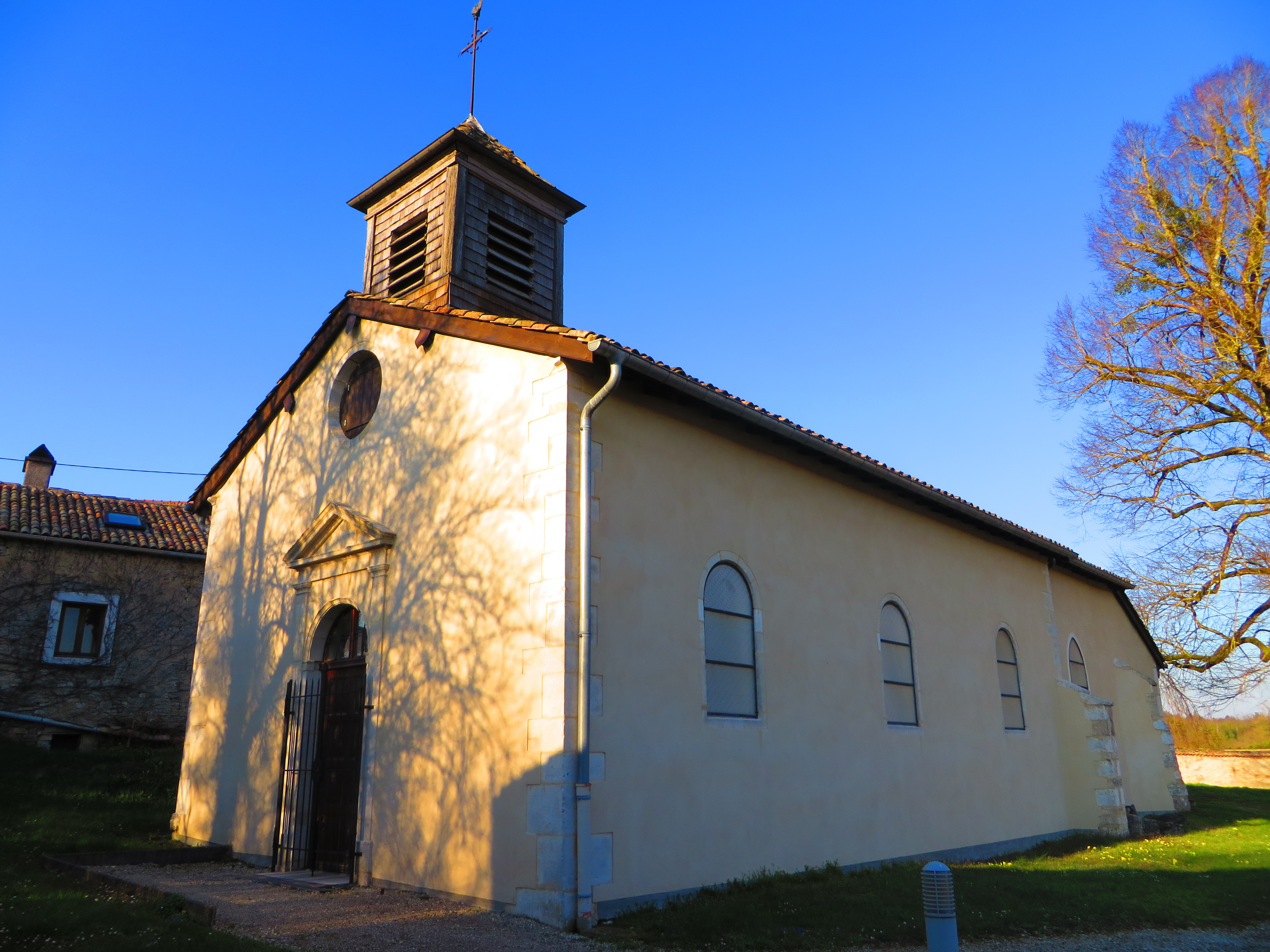
- The church in Les Roises

- Coat of arms
- Location of Les Roises
- Location within France Location within Grand Est
- Coordinates: 48°27′22″N 5°38′31″E
- Country: France
- Region: Grand Est
- Department: Meuse
- Arrondissement: Commercy
- Canton: Ligny-en-Barrois
- Intercommunality: Portes de Meuse

Government
  - Mayor (2020–2026): Patricia Thiéry
- Area^{1}: 3.92 km^{2} (1.51 sq mi)
- Elevation: 235 m (771 ft)
- Highest elevation: 398 m (1,306 ft)
- Lowest elevation: 286 m (938 ft)
- Population (2023): 27
  - Density: 6.9/km^{2} (18/sq mi)
- Time zone: UTC+01:00 (CET)
  - Summer (DST): UTC+02:00 (CEST)
- INSEE/Postal code: 55436 /55130
- ^{1} French Land Register data, which excludes lakes, ponds, glaciers > 1 km^{2} (0.386 sq mi or 247 acres) and river estuaries.

Les Roises (French pronunciation: [le ʁwaz]) is a commune in the Meuse department in Grand Est in north-eastern France.

In 1999 it contained 40 registered inhabitants.

== See also ==
- Communes of the Meuse department
