= Bonnet, Meuse =

Bonnet
- Commune
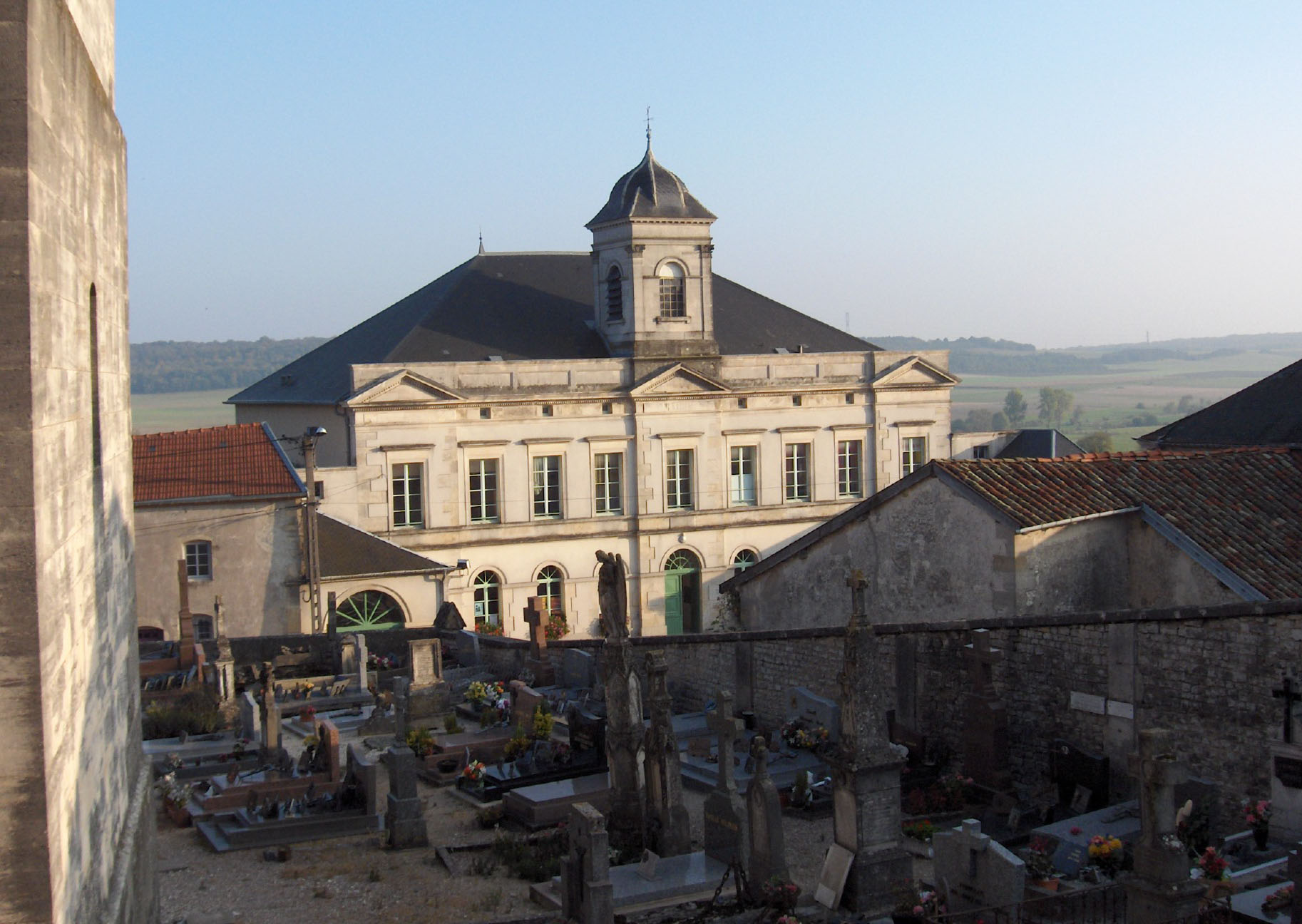
- The town hall and cemetery in Bonnet

- Coat of arms
- Location of Bonnet
- Location within France Location within Grand Est
- Coordinates: 48°31′23″N 5°26′18″E
- Country: France
- Region: Grand Est
- Department: Meuse
- Arrondissement: Commercy
- Canton: Ligny-en-Barrois

Government
  - Mayor (2020–2026): Philippe Andre
- Area^{1}: 29.06 km^{2} (11.22 sq mi)
- Elevation: 324 m (1,063 ft)
- Highest elevation: 408 m (1,339 ft)
- Lowest elevation: 292 m (958 ft)
- Population (2023): 177
  - Density: 6.09/km^{2} (15.8/sq mi)
- Time zone: UTC+01:00 (CET)
  - Summer (DST): UTC+02:00 (CEST)
- INSEE/Postal code: 55059 /55130
- ^{1} French Land Register data, which excludes lakes, ponds, glaciers > 1 km^{2} (0.386 sq mi or 247 acres) and river estuaries.

Bonnet (French pronunciation: [bɔnɛ]) is a commune in the Meuse department in Grand Est in northeastern France.

== Population ==
Historical population
Year	Pop.	±% p.a.
1968	276	—
1975	243	−1.80%
1982	245	+0.12%
1990	236	−0.47%
1999	198	−1.93%
2007	215	+1.03%
2012	210	−0.47%
2017	200	−0.97%
2023	177	−2.02%
Source: INSEE

== See also ==
- Communes of the Meuse department
