= Villers-le-Sec, Meuse =

Villers-le-Sec
- Commune
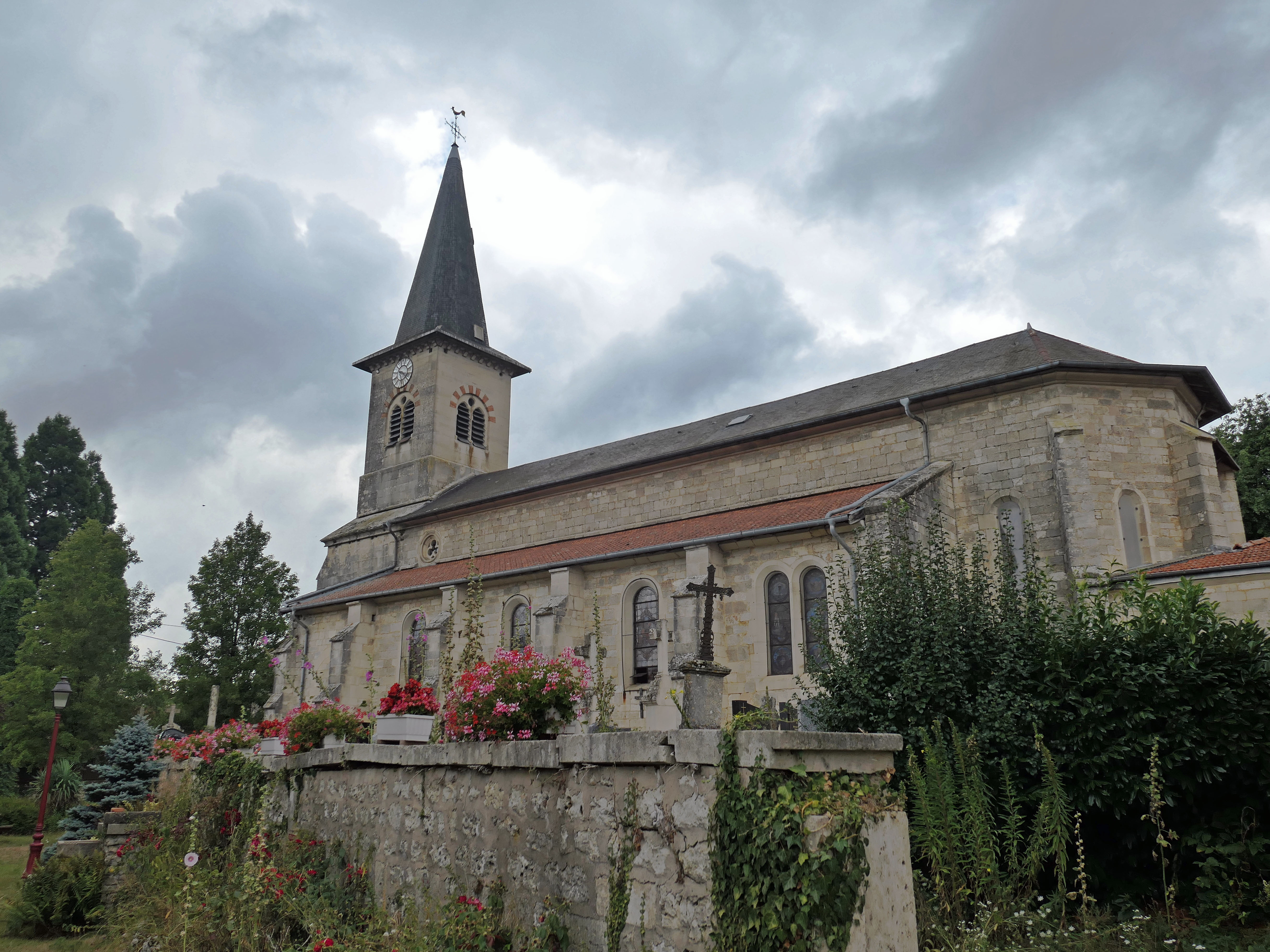

- Coat of arms
- Location of Villers-le-Sec
- Location within France Location within Grand Est
- Coordinates: 48°37′14″N 5°17′47″E
- Country: France
- Region: Grand Est
- Department: Meuse
- Arrondissement: Bar-le-Duc
- Canton: Ligny-en-Barrois

Government
  - Mayor (2020–2026): Dominique Karp
- Area^{1}: 7 km^{2} (2.7 sq mi)
- Elevation: 297 m (974 ft)
- Population (2023): 135
  - Density: 19/km^{2} (50/sq mi)
- Time zone: UTC+01:00 (CET)
  - Summer (DST): UTC+02:00 (CEST)
- INSEE/Postal code: 55562 /55500
- ^{1} French Land Register data, which excludes lakes, ponds, glaciers > 1 km^{2} (0.386 sq mi or 247 acres) and river estuaries.

Villers-le-Sec (French pronunciation: [vilɛʁ lə sɛk]) is a commune in the Meuse department in Grand Est in north-eastern France. Its epithet "Sec" (dry) comes from the fact that no rivers pass through Villers-le-Sec, which is located on the plateau between the rivers Ornain and Saulx. However, the village is not completely deprived of water since it is located above a water table and there are many ponds.

== History ==
Villers-le-Sec had more than 500 inhabitants in the middle of the 19th century, when an iron mine was operated near the village. Forestry remains a significant resource today. The only industry which remains today is a distillery, which produces mirabelle brandy during the low season.

== See also ==
- Communes of the Meuse department
