= Hévilliers =

- Commune
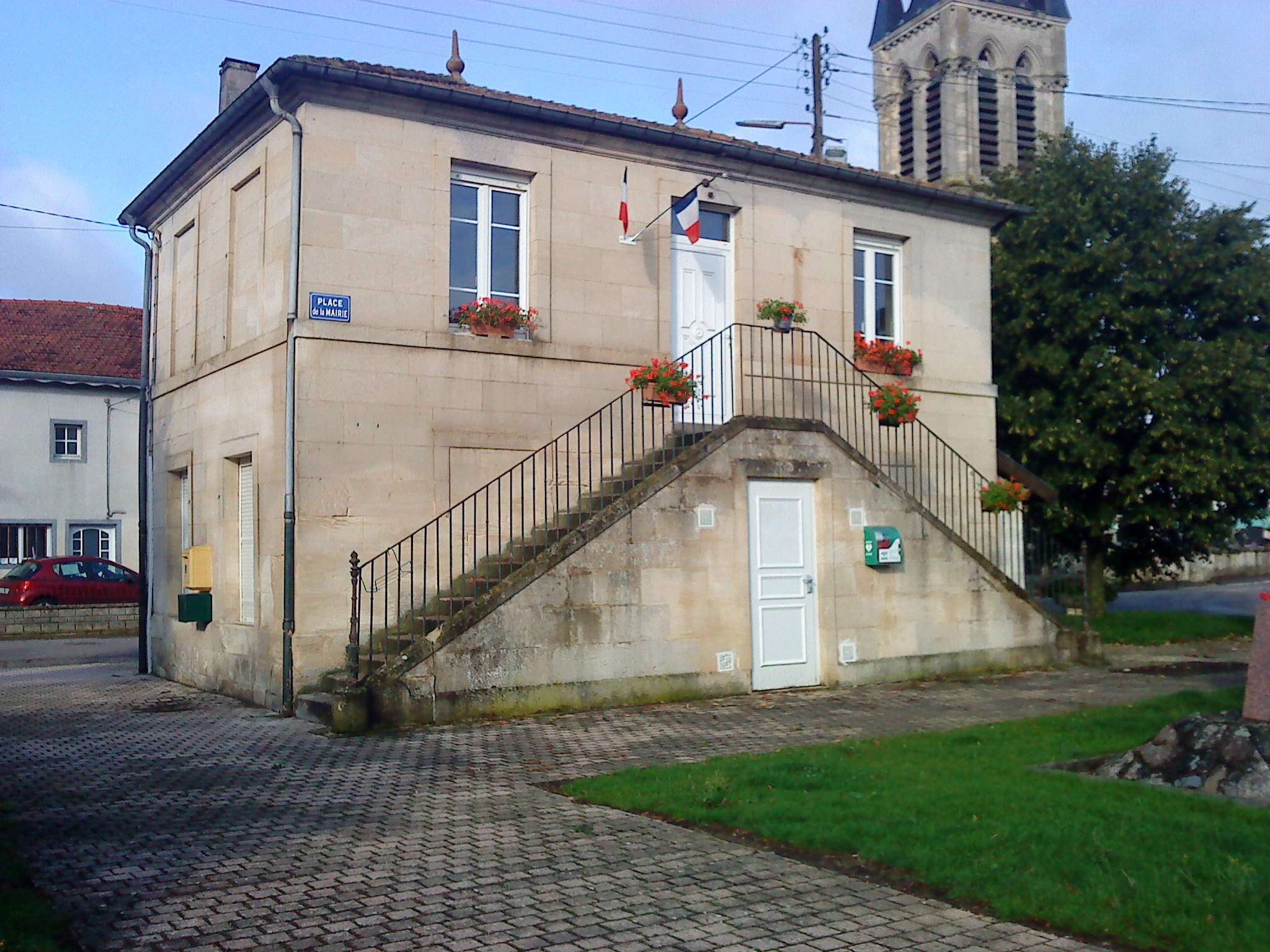
- The town hall in Hévilliers

- Coat of arms
- Location of Hévilliers
- Location within France Location within Grand Est
- Coordinates: 48°36′10″N 5°19′59″E
- Country: France
- Region: Grand Est
- Department: Meuse
- Arrondissement: Bar-le-Duc
- Canton: Ligny-en-Barrois
- Intercommunality: CC Portes de Meuse

Government
  - Mayor (2020–2026): Michel Loisy
- Area^{1}: 10.6 km^{2} (4.1 sq mi)
- Elevation: 300 m (980 ft)
- Highest elevation: 346 m (1,135 ft)
- Lowest elevation: 270 m (890 ft)
- Population (2023): 158
  - Density: 14.9/km^{2} (38.6/sq mi)
- Time zone: UTC+01:00 (CET)
  - Summer (DST): UTC+02:00 (CEST)
- INSEE/Postal code: 55246 /55290
- ^{1} French Land Register data, which excludes lakes, ponds, glaciers > 1 km^{2} (0.386 sq mi or 247 acres) and river estuaries.

Hévilliers (French pronunciation: [evilje]) is a commune in the Meuse department in Grand Est in north-eastern France.

== See also ==
- Communes of the Meuse department
