= Couvertpuis =

- Commune
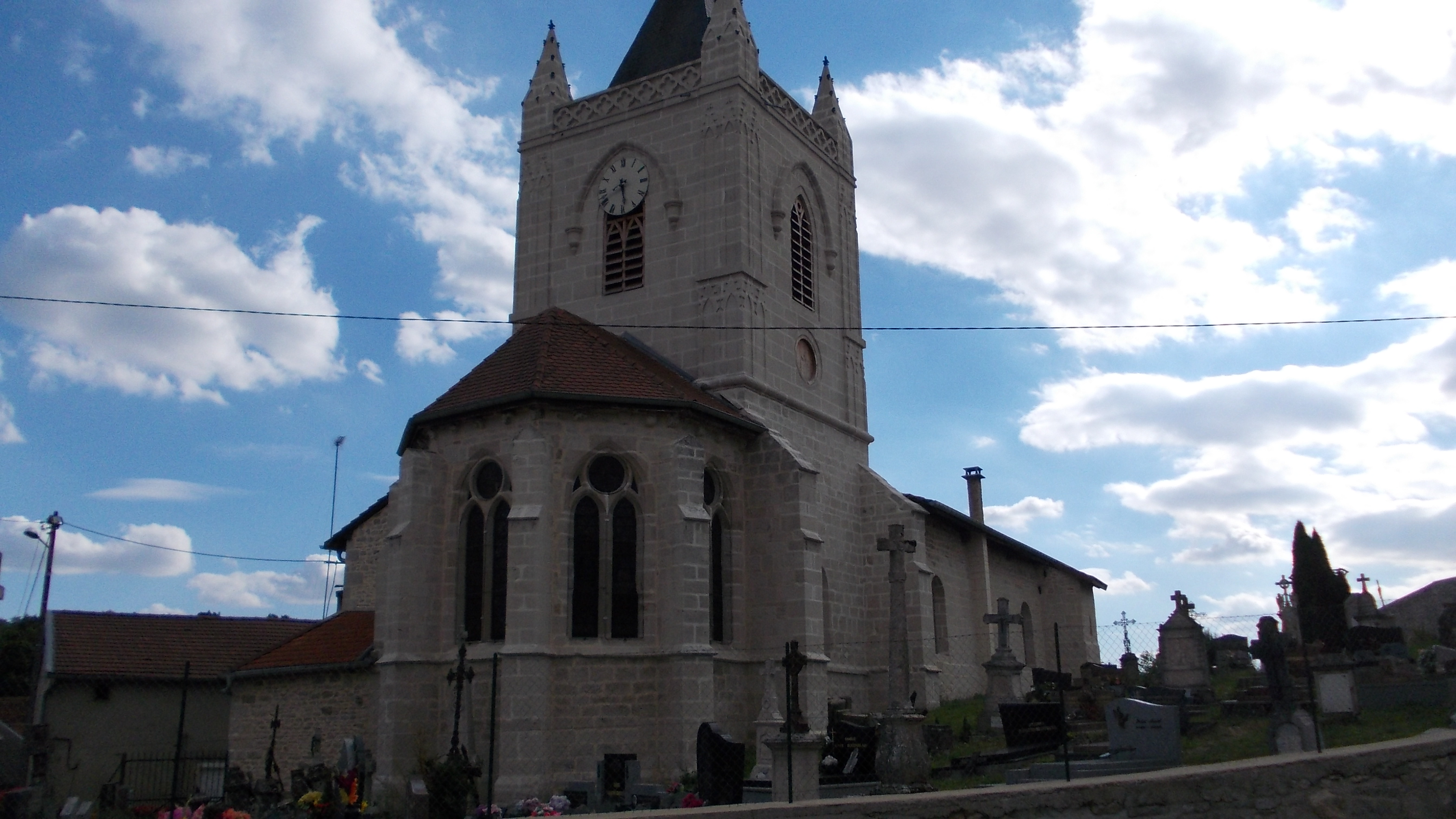
- The church in Couvertpuis

- Coat of arms
- Location of Couvertpuis
- Location within France Location within Grand Est
- Coordinates: 48°34′57″N 5°18′10″E
- Country: France
- Region: Grand Est
- Department: Meuse
- Arrondissement: Bar-le-Duc
- Canton: Ligny-en-Barrois
- Intercommunality: CC Portes de Meuse

Government
  - Mayor (2020–2026): Sébastien Legrand
- Area^{1}: 8.87 km^{2} (3.42 sq mi)
- Elevation: 266 m (873 ft)
- Highest elevation: 344 m (1,129 ft)
- Lowest elevation: 257 m (843 ft)
- Population (2023): 79
  - Density: 8.9/km^{2} (23/sq mi)
- Time zone: UTC+01:00 (CET)
  - Summer (DST): UTC+02:00 (CEST)
- INSEE/Postal code: 55133 /55290
- ^{1} French Land Register data, which excludes lakes, ponds, glaciers > 1 km^{2} (0.386 sq mi or 247 acres) and river estuaries.

Couvertpuis (French pronunciation: [kuvɛʁpɥi]) is a commune in the Meuse department in Grand Est in north-eastern France.

== See also ==
- Communes of the Meuse department
