= Fouchères-aux-Bois =

- Commune
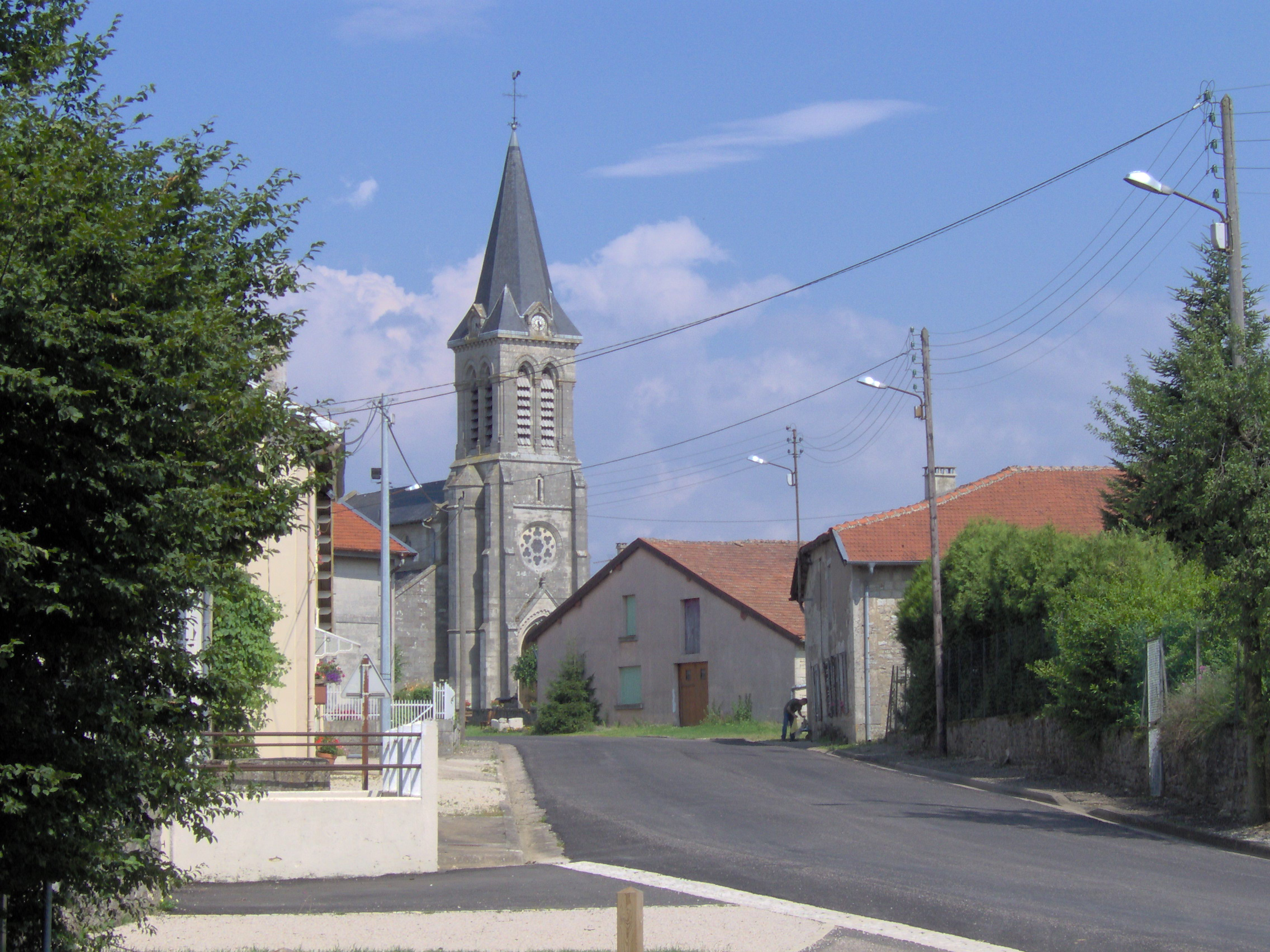
- The church in Fouchères-aux-Bois

- Coat of arms
- Location of Fouchères-aux-Bois
- Location within France Location within Grand Est
- Coordinates: 48°37′22″N 5°14′47″E
- Country: France
- Region: Grand Est
- Department: Meuse
- Arrondissement: Bar-le-Duc
- Canton: Ligny-en-Barrois
- Intercommunality: CC Portes de Meuse

Government
  - Mayor (2020–2026): Laurent Magron
- Area^{1}: 5.57 km^{2} (2.15 sq mi)
- Elevation: 289 m (948 ft)
- Highest elevation: 322 m (1,056 ft)
- Lowest elevation: 240 m (790 ft)
- Population (2023): 138
  - Density: 24.8/km^{2} (64.2/sq mi)
- Time zone: UTC+01:00 (CET)
  - Summer (DST): UTC+02:00 (CEST)
- INSEE/Postal code: 55195 /55500
- ^{1} French Land Register data, which excludes lakes, ponds, glaciers > 1 km^{2} (0.386 sq mi or 247 acres) and river estuaries.

Fouchères-aux-Bois (French pronunciation: [fuʃɛʁ o bwa]) is a commune in the Meuse department in Grand Est in north-eastern France.

== See also ==
- Communes of the Meuse department
