= Dammarie-sur-Saulx =

- Commune
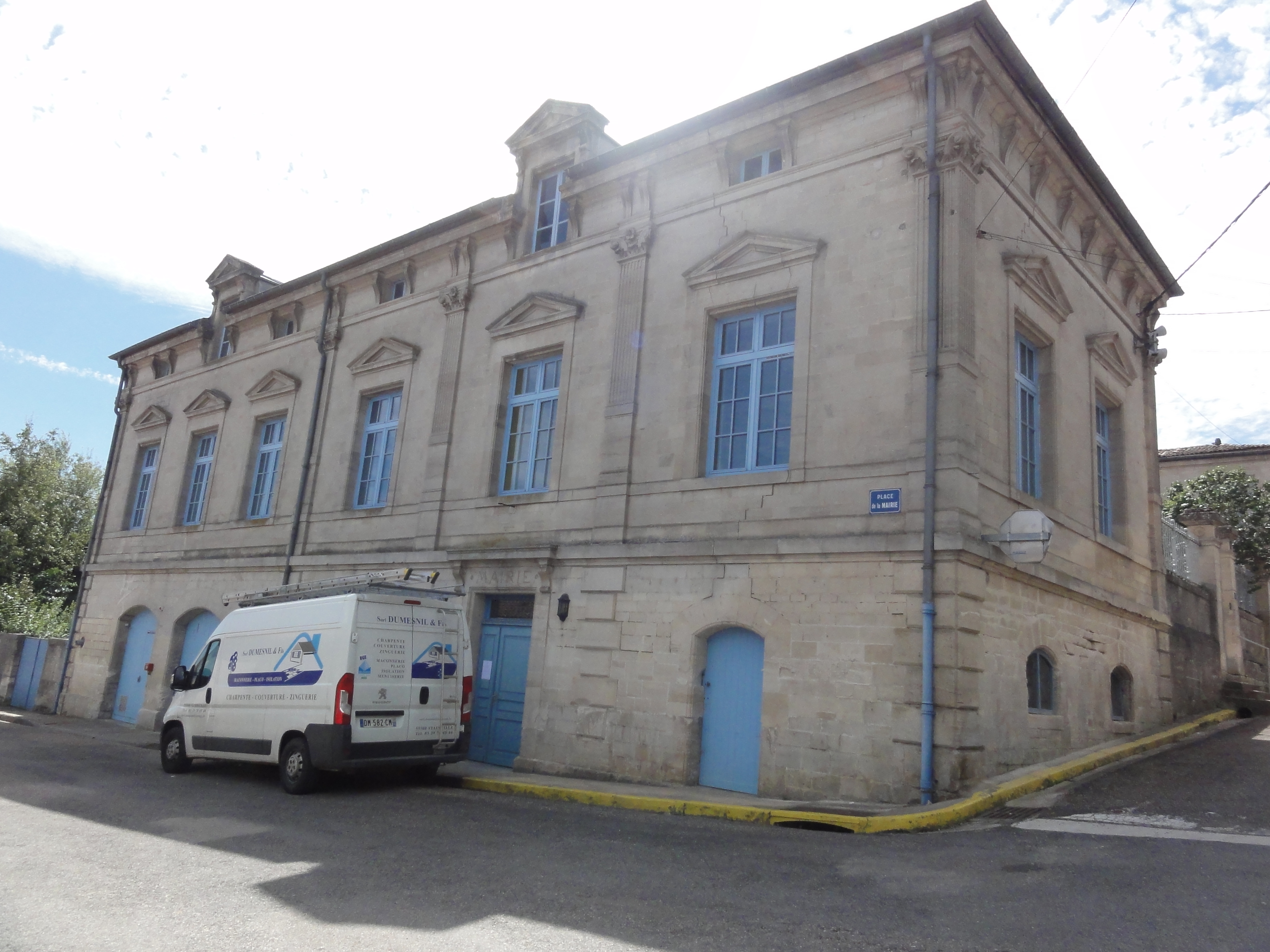
- The town hall in Dammarie-sur-Saulx

- Coat of arms
- Location of Dammarie-sur-Saulx
- Location within France Location within Grand Est
- Coordinates: 48°35′39″N 5°14′24″E
- Country: France
- Region: Grand Est
- Department: Meuse
- Arrondissement: Bar-le-Duc
- Canton: Ligny-en-Barrois
- Intercommunality: CC Portes de Meuse

Government
  - Mayor (2020–2026): Sylvain Fournier
- Area^{1}: 11.34 km^{2} (4.38 sq mi)
- Elevation: 246 m (807 ft)
- Highest elevation: 316 m (1,037 ft)
- Lowest elevation: 237 m (778 ft)
- Population (2023): 384
  - Density: 33.9/km^{2} (87.7/sq mi)
- Time zone: UTC+01:00 (CET)
  - Summer (DST): UTC+02:00 (CEST)
- INSEE/Postal code: 55144 /55500
- ^{1} French Land Register data, which excludes lakes, ponds, glaciers > 1 km^{2} (0.386 sq mi or 247 acres) and river estuaries.

Dammarie-sur-Saulx (French pronunciation: [damaʁi syʁ so], literally Dammarie on Saulx) is a commune in the Meuse department in Grand Est in north-eastern France.

== See also ==
- Communes of the Meuse department
