= Ménil-sur-Saulx =

- Commune
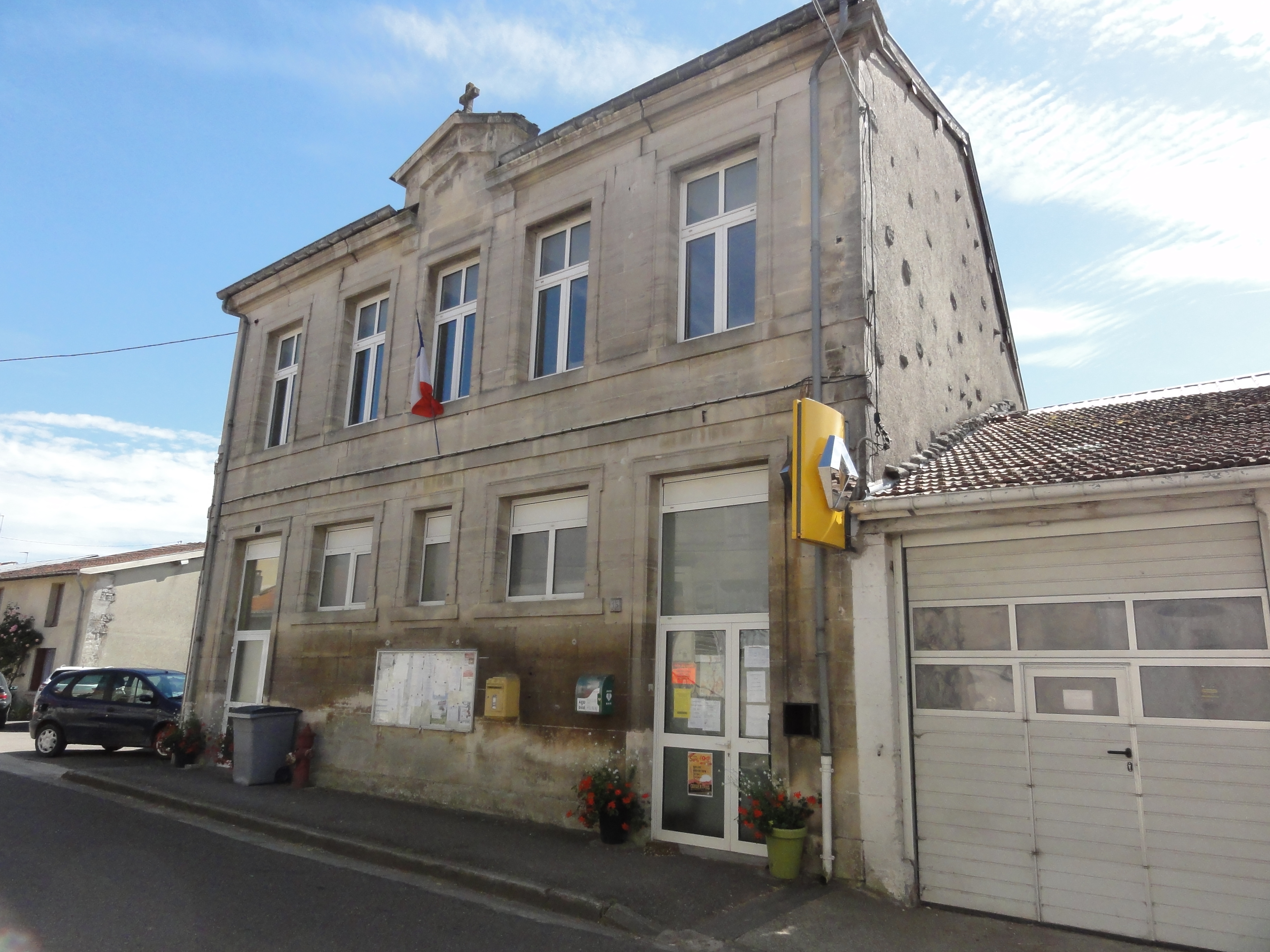
- The town hall in Ménil-sur-Saulx

- Coat of arms
- Location of Ménil-sur-Saulx
- Location within France Location within Grand Est
- Coordinates: 48°37′42″N 5°13′04″E
- Country: France
- Region: Grand Est
- Department: Meuse
- Arrondissement: Bar-le-Duc
- Canton: Ligny-en-Barrois
- Intercommunality: CC Portes de Meuse

Government
  - Mayor (2021–2026): Edith Lebret
- Area^{1}: 12.03 km^{2} (4.64 sq mi)
- Elevation: 238 m (781 ft)
- Highest elevation: 291 m (955 ft)
- Lowest elevation: 214 m (702 ft)
- Population (2023): 243
  - Density: 20.2/km^{2} (52.3/sq mi)
- Time zone: UTC+01:00 (CET)
  - Summer (DST): UTC+02:00 (CEST)
- INSEE/Postal code: 55335 /55500
- ^{1} French Land Register data, which excludes lakes, ponds, glaciers > 1 km^{2} (0.386 sq mi or 247 acres) and river estuaries.

Ménil-sur-Saulx (French pronunciation: [menil syʁ so], literally Ménil on Saulx) is a commune in the Meuse department in Grand Est in north-eastern France.

== Geography ==
The river Saulx flows northwestward through the commune and crosses the village.

== See also ==
- Communes of the Meuse department
