= Brauvilliers =

- Commune
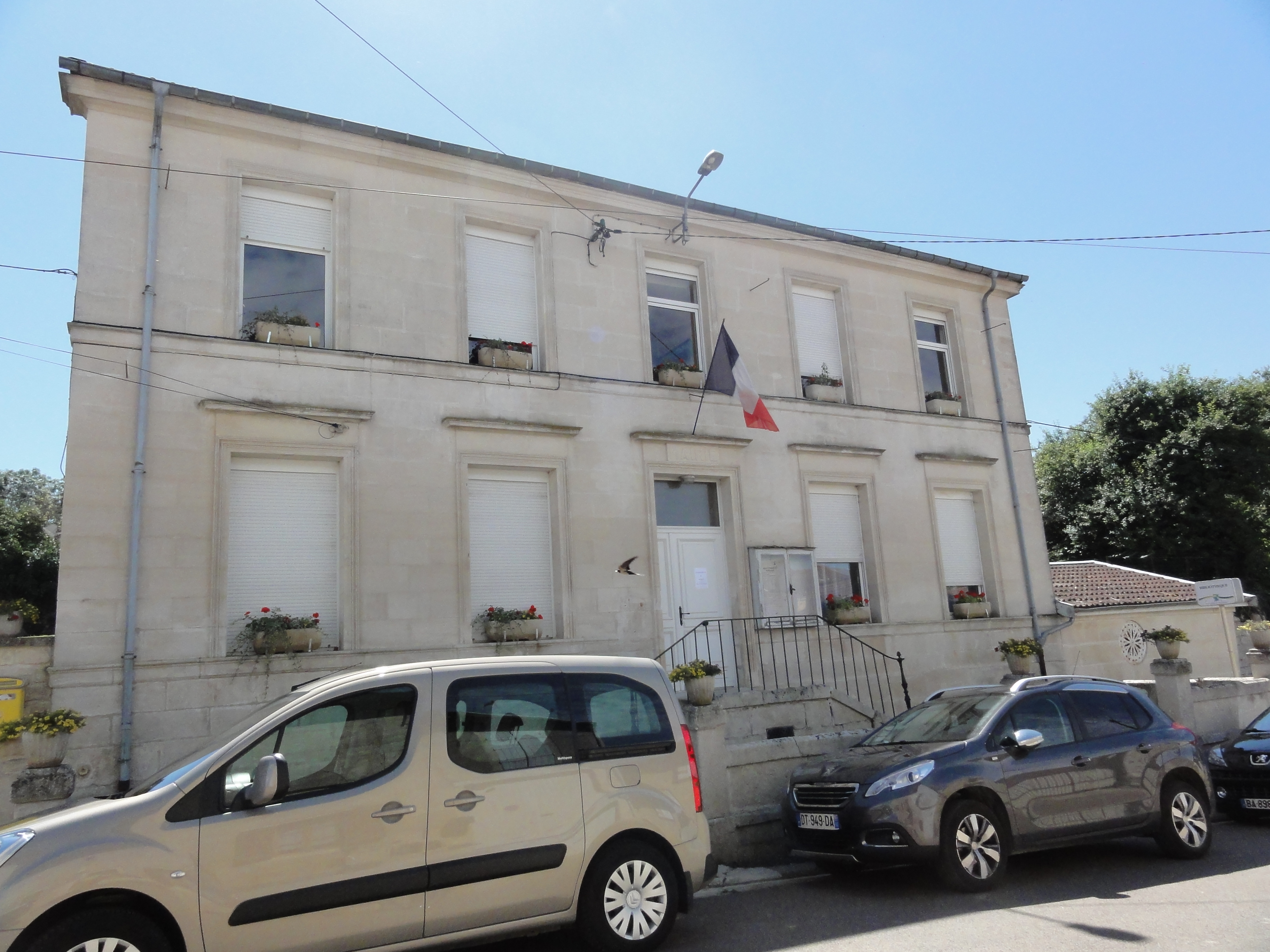
- The town hall in Brauvilliers

- Coat of arms
- Location of Brauvilliers
- Location within France Location within Grand Est
- Coordinates: 48°34′52″N 5°09′03″E
- Country: France
- Region: Grand Est
- Department: Meuse
- Arrondissement: Bar-le-Duc
- Canton: Ligny-en-Barrois
- Intercommunality: Portes de Meuse

Government
  - Mayor (2020–2026): Sandrine Davignon
- Area^{1}: 9.26 km^{2} (3.58 sq mi)
- Elevation: 280 m (920 ft)
- Highest elevation: 318 m (1,043 ft)
- Lowest elevation: 219 m (719 ft)
- Population (2023): 159
  - Density: 17.2/km^{2} (44.5/sq mi)
- Time zone: UTC+01:00 (CET)
  - Summer (DST): UTC+02:00 (CEST)
- INSEE/Postal code: 55075 /55170
- ^{1} French Land Register data, which excludes lakes, ponds, glaciers > 1 km^{2} (0.386 sq mi or 247 acres) and river estuaries.

Brauvilliers (French pronunciation: [bʁovilje]) is a commune in the Meuse department in Grand Est in northeastern France.

== Population ==
Historical population
Year	Pop.	±% p.a.
1968	196	—
1975	188	−0.59%
1982	169	−1.51%
1990	161	−0.60%
1999	149	−0.86%
2007	174	+1.96%
2012	160	−1.66%
2017	171	+1.34%
2023	159	−1.21%
Source: INSEE

== See also ==
- Communes of the Meuse department
