= Canton of Ligny-en-Barrois =

Coordinates: 48.69°N 5.32°E

The canton of Ligny-en-Barrois is an administrative division of the Meuse department, northeastern France. Its borders were modified at the French canton reorganisation which came into effect in March 2015. Its seat is in Ligny-en-Barrois.

It consists of the following communes:

1. Abainville
2. Amanty
3. Badonvilliers-Gérauvilliers
4. Biencourt-sur-Orge
5. Bonnet
6. Le Bouchon-sur-Saulx
7. Brauvilliers
8. Bure
9. Chanteraine
10. Chassey-Beaupré
11. Couvertpuis
12. Dainville-Bertheléville
13. Dammarie-sur-Saulx
14. Delouze-Rosières
15. Demange-Baudignécourt
16. Fouchères-aux-Bois
17. Givrauval
18. Gondrecourt-le-Château
19. Hévilliers
20. Horville-en-Ornois
21. Houdelaincourt
22. Ligny-en-Barrois
23. Longeaux
24. Mandres-en-Barrois
25. Mauvages
26. Menaucourt
27. Ménil-sur-Saulx
28. Montiers-sur-Saulx
29. Morley
30. Naix-aux-Forges
31. Nantois
32. Ribeaucourt
33. Les Roises
34. Saint-Amand-sur-Ornain
35. Saint-Joire
36. Tréveray
37. Vaudeville-le-Haut
38. Villers-le-Sec
39. Vouthon-Bas
40. Vouthon-Haut
