= Le Bouchon-sur-Saulx =

- Commune
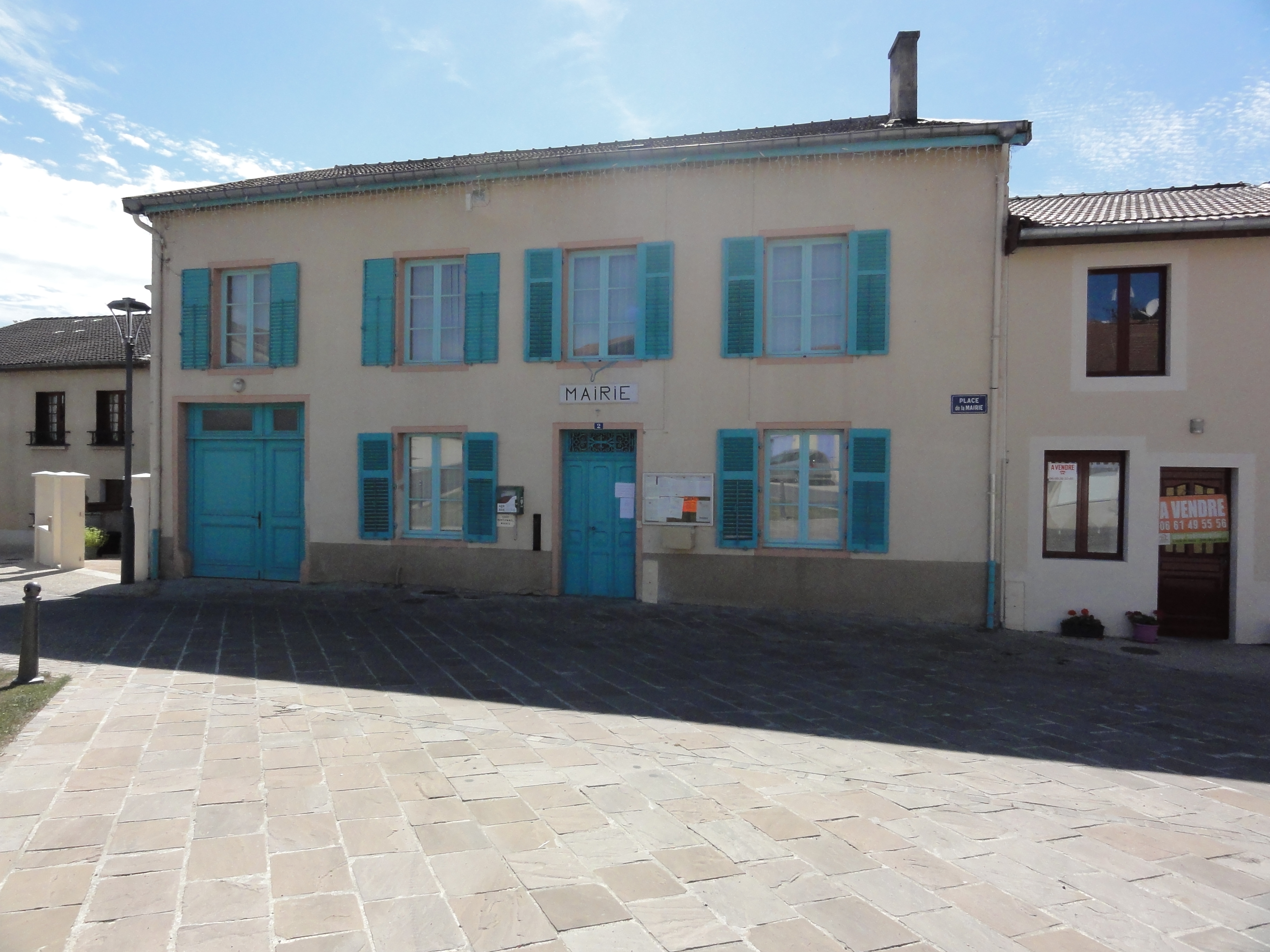
- The town hall in Le Bouchon-sur-Saulx

- Coat of arms
- Location of Le Bouchon-sur-Saulx
- Location within France Location within Grand Est
- Coordinates: 48°37′05″N 5°13′52″E
- Country: France
- Region: Grand Est
- Department: Meuse
- Arrondissement: Bar-le-Duc
- Canton: Ligny-en-Barrois

Government
  - Mayor (2020–2026): Hervé Van de Walle
- Area^{1}: 5.42 km^{2} (2.09 sq mi)
- Elevation: 268 m (879 ft)
- Highest elevation: 286 m (938 ft)
- Lowest elevation: 232 m (761 ft)
- Population (2023): 227
  - Density: 41.9/km^{2} (108/sq mi)
- Time zone: UTC+01:00 (CET)
  - Summer (DST): UTC+02:00 (CEST)
- INSEE/Postal code: 55061 /55500
- ^{1} French Land Register data, which excludes lakes, ponds, glaciers > 1 km^{2} (0.386 sq mi or 247 acres) and river estuaries.

Le Bouchon-sur-Saulx (French pronunciation: [lə buʃɔ̃ syʁ so], literally Le Bouchon on Saulx) is a commune in the Meuse department in Grand Est in northeastern France.

== Population ==
Historical population
Year	Pop.	±% p.a.
1968	266	—
1975	265	−0.05%
1982	275	+0.53%
1990	245	−1.43%
1999	219	−1.24%
2007	222	+0.17%
2012	245	+1.99%
2017	241	−0.33%
2023	227	−0.99%
Source: INSEE

== See also ==
- Communes of the Meuse department
