= Morley, Meuse =

Morley
- Commune
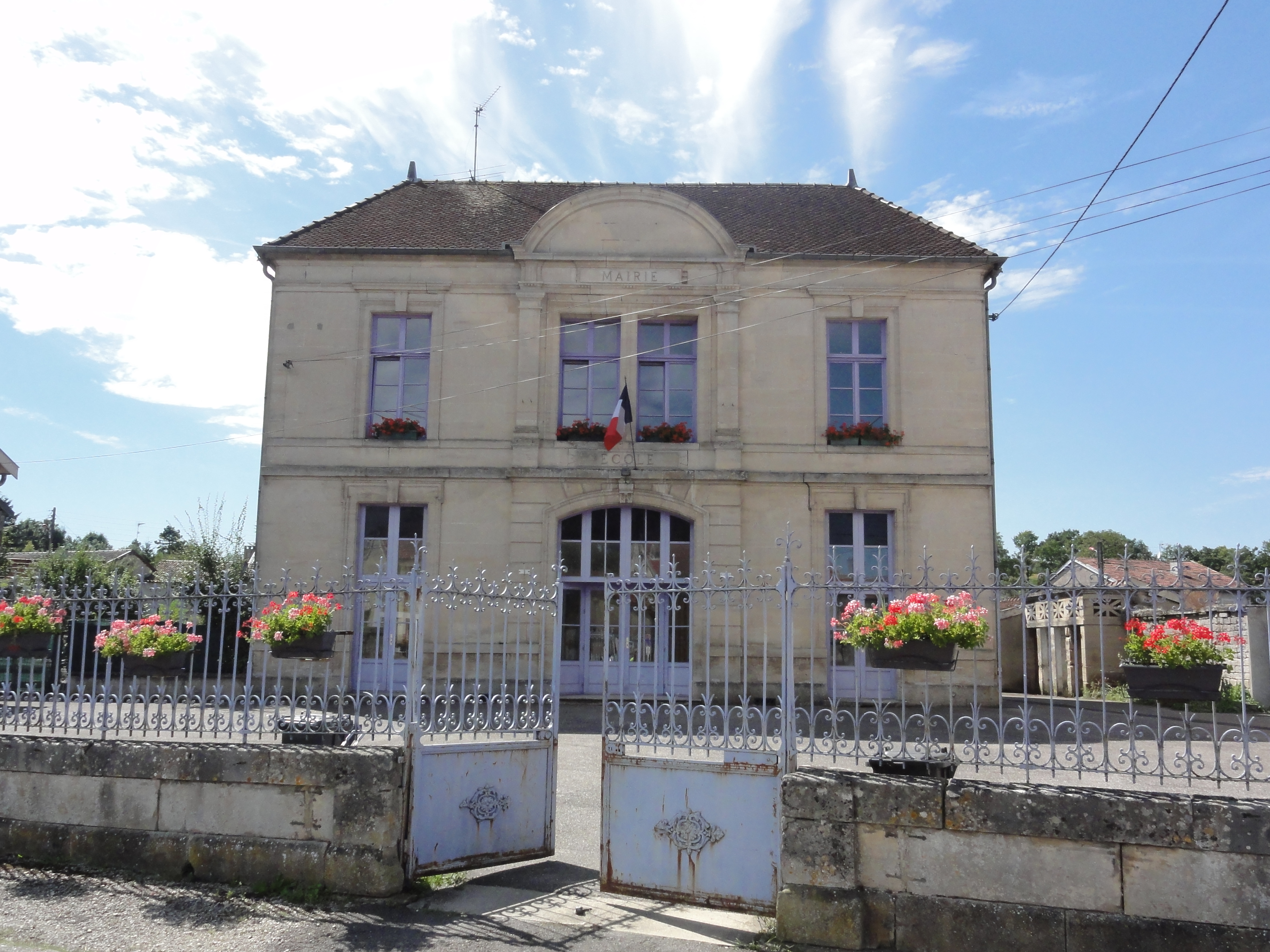
- The town hall in Morley

- Coat of arms
- Location of Morley
- Location within France Location within Grand Est
- Coordinates: 48°34′46″N 5°14′51″E
- Country: France
- Region: Grand Est
- Department: Meuse
- Arrondissement: Bar-le-Duc
- Canton: Ligny-en-Barrois
- Intercommunality: CC Portes de Meuse

Government
  - Mayor (2020–2026): Marie-Laure Chevallier
- Area^{1}: 24.75 km^{2} (9.56 sq mi)
- Elevation: 258 m (846 ft)
- Highest elevation: 342 m (1,122 ft)
- Lowest elevation: 238 m (781 ft)
- Population (2023): 204
  - Density: 8.24/km^{2} (21.3/sq mi)
- Time zone: UTC+01:00 (CET)
  - Summer (DST): UTC+02:00 (CEST)
- INSEE/Postal code: 55359 /55290
- ^{1} French Land Register data, which excludes lakes, ponds, glaciers > 1 km^{2} (0.386 sq mi or 247 acres) and river estuaries.

Morley (French pronunciation: [mɔʁlɛ]) is a commune in the Meuse department in Grand Est in north-eastern France.

== See also ==
- Communes of the Meuse department
