= Ribeaucourt, Meuse =

Ribeaucourt
- Commune
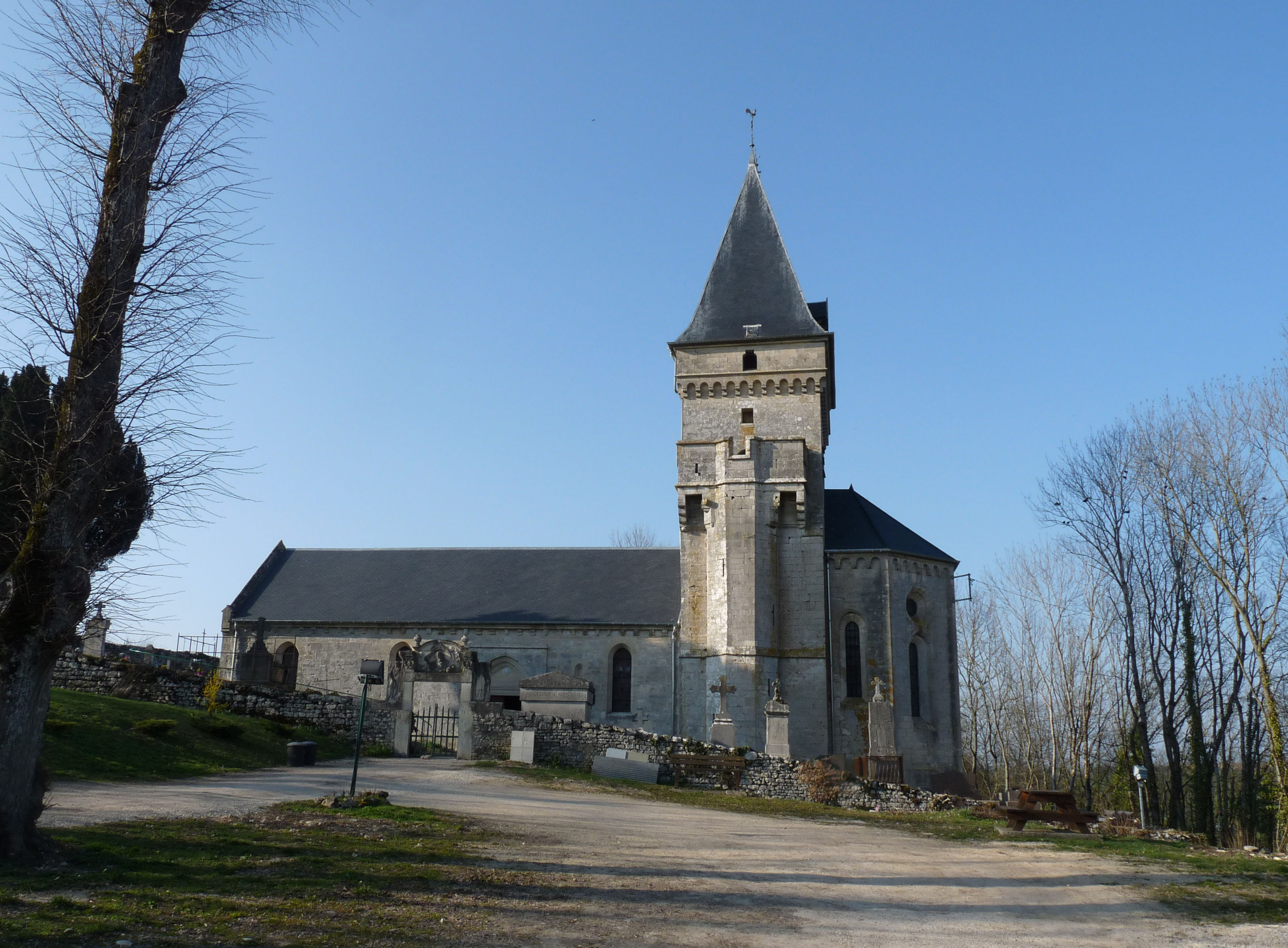
- The church in Ribeaucourt

- Coat of arms
- Location of Ribeaucourt
- Location within France Location within Grand Est
- Coordinates: 48°32′42″N 5°21′20″E
- Country: France
- Region: Grand Est
- Department: Meuse
- Arrondissement: Bar-le-Duc
- Canton: Ligny-en-Barrois
- Intercommunality: CC Portes de Meuse

Government
  - Mayor (2020–2026): Gilles Huardel
- Area^{1}: 12.54 km^{2} (4.84 sq mi)
- Elevation: 300 m (980 ft)
- Highest elevation: 387 m (1,270 ft)
- Lowest elevation: 292 m (958 ft)
- Population (2023): 72
  - Density: 5.7/km^{2} (15/sq mi)
- Time zone: UTC+01:00 (CET)
  - Summer (DST): UTC+02:00 (CEST)
- INSEE/Postal code: 55430 /55290
- ^{1} French Land Register data, which excludes lakes, ponds, glaciers > 1 km^{2} (0.386 sq mi or 247 acres) and river estuaries.

Ribeaucourt (French pronunciation: [ʁibokuʁ]) is a commune in the Meuse department in Grand Est in north-eastern France.

== See also ==
- Communes of the Meuse department
