= Canton of Vavincourt =

Former canton in Meuse, France

Coordinates: 48°49′29″N 5°09′17″E

- Former canton
- Location of the canton in the arrondissement of Bar-le-Duc
- Country: France
- Region: Grand Est
- Department: Meuse
- No. of communes: {{{nbcomm}}}
- Disbanded: 2015

Government
  - Representatives: Jean-Claude Salziger
- Area: 127.59 km^{2} (49.26 sq mi)
- Population (2012): 3,650
  - Density: 28.6/km^{2} (74.1/sq mi)

The canton of Vavincourt (French: Canton de Vavincourt) is a former French canton located in the department of Meuse in the Lorraine region (now part of Grand Est). This canton was organized around Vavincourt in the arrondissement of Bar-le-Duc. It is now part of the cantons of Bar-le-Duc-1 and Bar-le-Duc-2.

The last general councillor from this canton was Jean-Claude Salziger (PS), elected in 2004.

== Composition ==
The canton of Vavincourt grouped together 11 municipalities and had 3,650 inhabitants (2012 census without double counts).

1. Behonne
2. Chardogne
3. Érize-la-Brûlée
4. Érize-Saint-Dizier
5. Géry
6. Naives-Rosières
7. Raival
8. Resson
9. Rumont
10. Seigneulles
11. Vavincourt
