= Érize-la-Brûlée =

- Commune
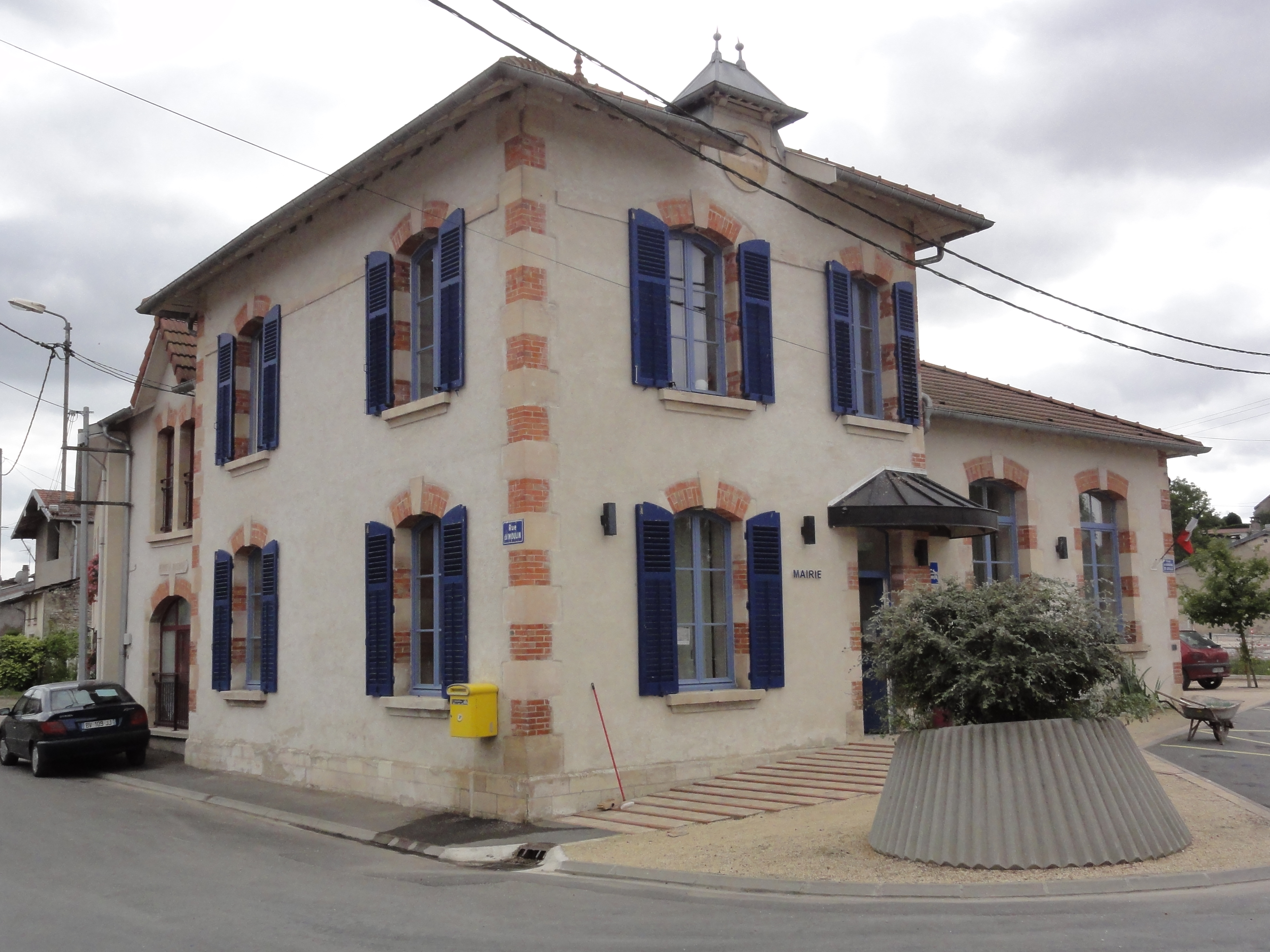
- The town hall in Érize-la-Brûlée

- Coat of arms
- Location of Érize-la-Brûlée
- Location within France Location within Grand Est
- Coordinates: 48°51′02″N 5°17′03″E
- Country: France
- Region: Grand Est
- Department: Meuse
- Arrondissement: Bar-le-Duc
- Canton: Bar-le-Duc-1

Government
  - Mayor (2020–2026): Jean-Louis Adrian
- Area^{1}: 10.82 km^{2} (4.18 sq mi)
- Elevation: 282 m (925 ft)
- Highest elevation: 363 m (1,191 ft)
- Lowest elevation: 278 m (912 ft)
- Population (2023): 175
  - Density: 16.2/km^{2} (41.9/sq mi)
- Time zone: UTC+01:00 (CET)
  - Summer (DST): UTC+02:00 (CEST)
- INSEE/Postal code: 55175 /55260
- ^{1} French Land Register data, which excludes lakes, ponds, glaciers > 1 km^{2} (0.386 sq mi or 247 acres) and river estuaries.

Érize-la-Brûlée (French pronunciation: [eʁiz la bʁyle]) is a commune in the Meuse department in Grand Est in north-eastern France.

It is located 80 km south-west of Metz and north-west of Nancy. Nearby settlements include Érize-Saint-Dizier, Rumont, Raival, Érize-la-Petite, and Chaumont-sur-Aire.

Its name derives from the name of the local river L'Ezrule (in Latin, Ericia). The suffix 'la-Brûlée', meaning 'burnt', may date back to 1247 when the village was destroyed by invaders.

== See also ==
- Communes of the Meuse department
