= Vulaines (disambiguation) =

Vulaines is a commune in the Aube department in north-central France.

Vulaines may also refer to the following departments in France:

- Vulaines-lès-Provins, Seine-et-Marne
- Vulaines-sur-Seine, Seine-et-Marne
- Voulaines-les-Templiers, Côte-d'Or

== See also ==
- Velaines
- Velaine (disambiguation)
