= Velaine =

Velaine is a French language placename and may refer to the following:

== Belgium ==
- Velaine-sur-Sambre, a locality in the municipality of Sambreville, province of Namur

== France ==
- Velaine-en-Haye, a commune in the department of Meurthe-et-Moselle
- Velaine-sous-Amance, a commune in the department of Meurthe-et-Moselle

== See also ==
- Velaines
- Velanne
- Vulaines (disambiguation)
