= Rumont =

Rumont is the name of two communes in France:

- Rumont, Meuse, in the Meuse département
- Rumont, Seine-et-Marne, in the Seine-et-Marne département
