= Buthiers =

Buthiers may refer to:

- Buthiers, Haute-Saône, a commune of the Haute-Saône département in France
- Buthiers, Seine-et-Marne, a commune of the Seine-et-Marne département in France
