= Givrauval =

- Commune
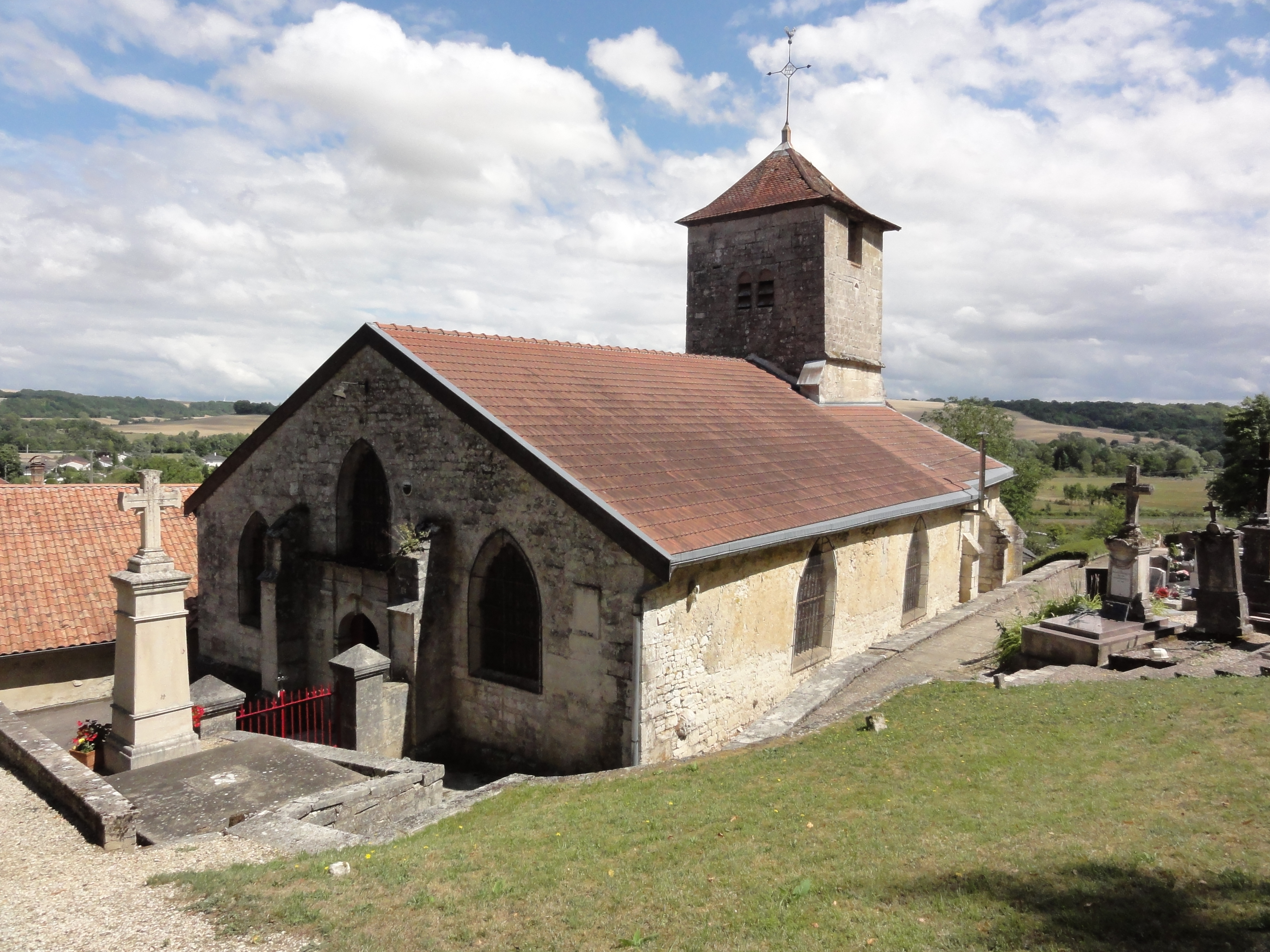
- The church in Givrauval

- Coat of arms
- Location of Givrauval
- Location within France Location within Grand Est
- Coordinates: 48°39′44″N 5°19′31″E
- Country: France
- Region: Grand Est
- Department: Meuse
- Arrondissement: Bar-le-Duc
- Canton: Ligny-en-Barrois
- Intercommunality: CA Bar-le-Duc - Sud Meuse

Government
  - Mayor (2020–2026): Michel Viard
- Area^{1}: 9.69 km^{2} (3.74 sq mi)
- Highest elevation: 359 m (1,178 ft)
- Lowest elevation: 224 m (735 ft)
- Population (2023): 287
  - Density: 29.6/km^{2} (76.7/sq mi)
- Time zone: UTC+01:00 (CET)
  - Summer (DST): UTC+02:00 (CEST)
- INSEE/Postal code: 55214 /55500
- ^{1} French Land Register data, which excludes lakes, ponds, glaciers > 1 km^{2} (0.386 sq mi or 247 acres) and river estuaries.

Givrauval (French pronunciation: [ʒivʁoval]) is a commune in the Meuse department in Grand Est in north-eastern France.

== See also ==
- Communes of the Meuse department
