= Communauté d'agglomération de Bar-le-Duc - Sud Meuse =

Bar-le-Duc - Sud Meuse
- Communauté d'agglomération
- Interactive map of Bar-le-Duc - Sud Meuse
- Coordinates: 48°45′N 05°14′E
- Country: France
- Region: Grand Est
- Department: Meuse
- No. of communes: {{{nbcomm}}}
- Established: 2013
- Area: 400.0 km^{2} (154.4 sq mi)
- Population (2019): 34,222
  - Density: 85.56/km^{2} (221.6/sq mi)
- Website: www.meusegrandsud.fr

Communauté d'agglomération de Bar-le-Duc - Sud Meuse is the communauté d'agglomération, an intercommunal structure, centred on the town of Bar-le-Duc. It is located in the Meuse department, in the Grand Est region, northeastern France. Created in 2013, its seat is in Bar-le-Duc. Its area is 400.0 km^{2}. Its population was 34,222 in 2019, of which 14,625 in Bar-le-Duc proper.

== Composition ==
The communauté d'agglomération consists of the following 33 communes:

1. Bar-le-Duc
2. Behonne
3. Beurey-sur-Saulx
4. Chanteraine
5. Chardogne
6. Combles-en-Barrois
7. Culey
8. Fains-Véel
9. Givrauval
10. Guerpont
11. Ligny-en-Barrois
12. Loisey
13. Longeaux
14. Longeville-en-Barrois
15. Menaucourt
16. Naives-Rosières
17. Naix-aux-Forges
18. Nançois-sur-Ornain
19. Nant-le-Grand
20. Nantois
21. Resson
22. Robert-Espagne
23. Rumont
24. Saint-Amand-sur-Ornain
25. Salmagne
26. Savonnières-devant-Bar
27. Silmont
28. Tannois
29. Trémont-sur-Saulx
30. Tronville-en-Barrois
31. Val-d'Ornain
32. Vavincourt
33. Velaines
