= Menaucourt =

- Commune
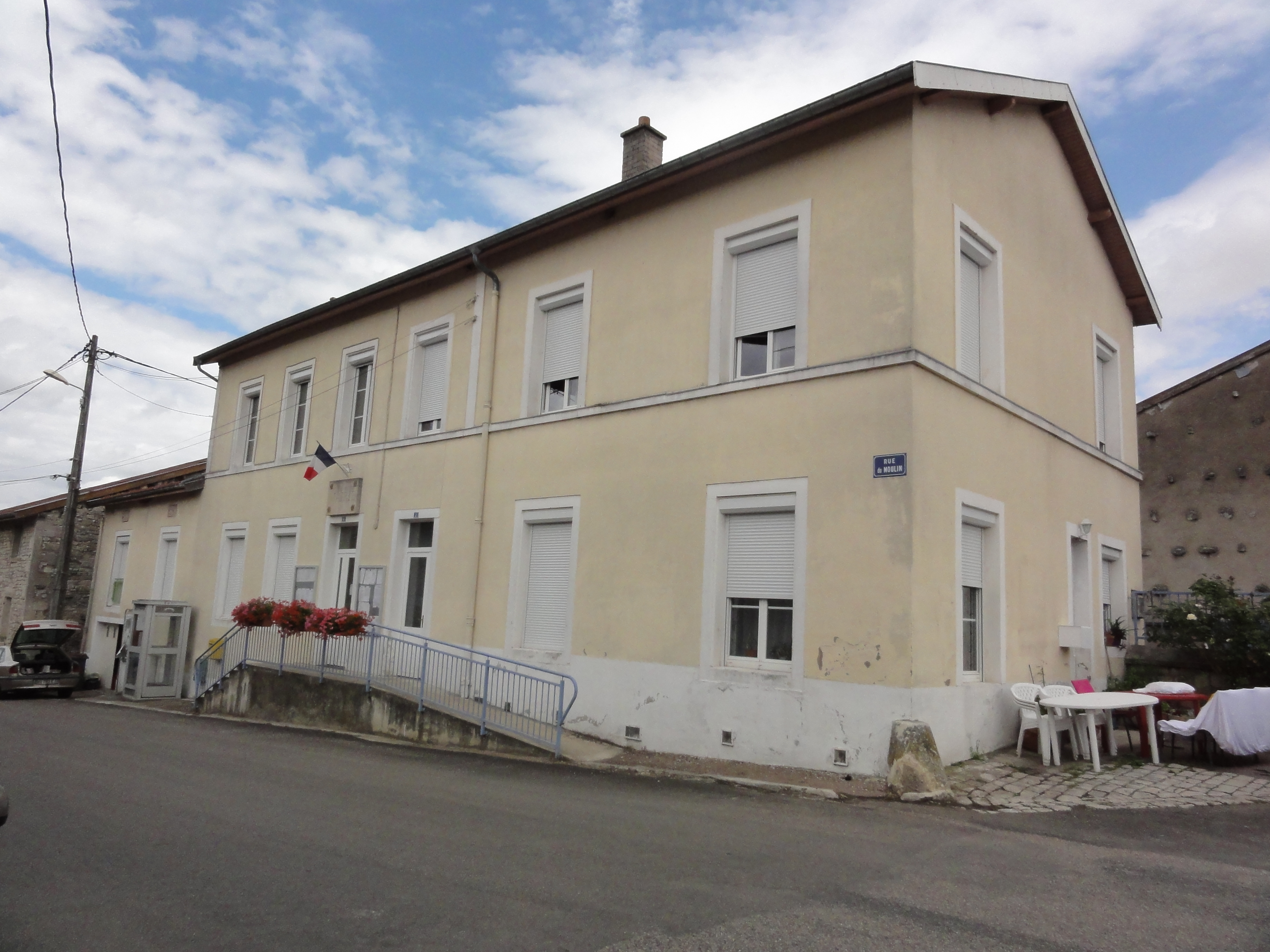
- The town hall in Menaucourt

- Coat of arms
- Location of Menaucourt
- Location within France Location within Grand Est
- Coordinates: 48°39′05″N 5°21′20″E
- Country: France
- Region: Grand Est
- Department: Meuse
- Arrondissement: Bar-le-Duc
- Canton: Ligny-en-Barrois
- Intercommunality: CA Bar-le-Duc - Sud Meuse

Government
  - Mayor (2020–2026): Christophe Galopin
- Area^{1}: 6.3 km^{2} (2.4 sq mi)
- Elevation: 238 m (781 ft)
- Highest elevation: 376 m (1,234 ft)
- Lowest elevation: 227 m (745 ft)
- Population (2023): 221
  - Density: 35/km^{2} (91/sq mi)
- Time zone: UTC+01:00 (CET)
  - Summer (DST): UTC+02:00 (CEST)
- INSEE/Postal code: 55332 /55500
- ^{1} French Land Register data, which excludes lakes, ponds, glaciers > 1 km^{2} (0.386 sq mi or 247 acres) and river estuaries.

Menaucourt (French pronunciation: [mənokuʁ]) is a commune in the Meuse department in Grand Est in north-eastern France.

== See also ==
- Communes of the Meuse department
