= Laimont =

- Commune
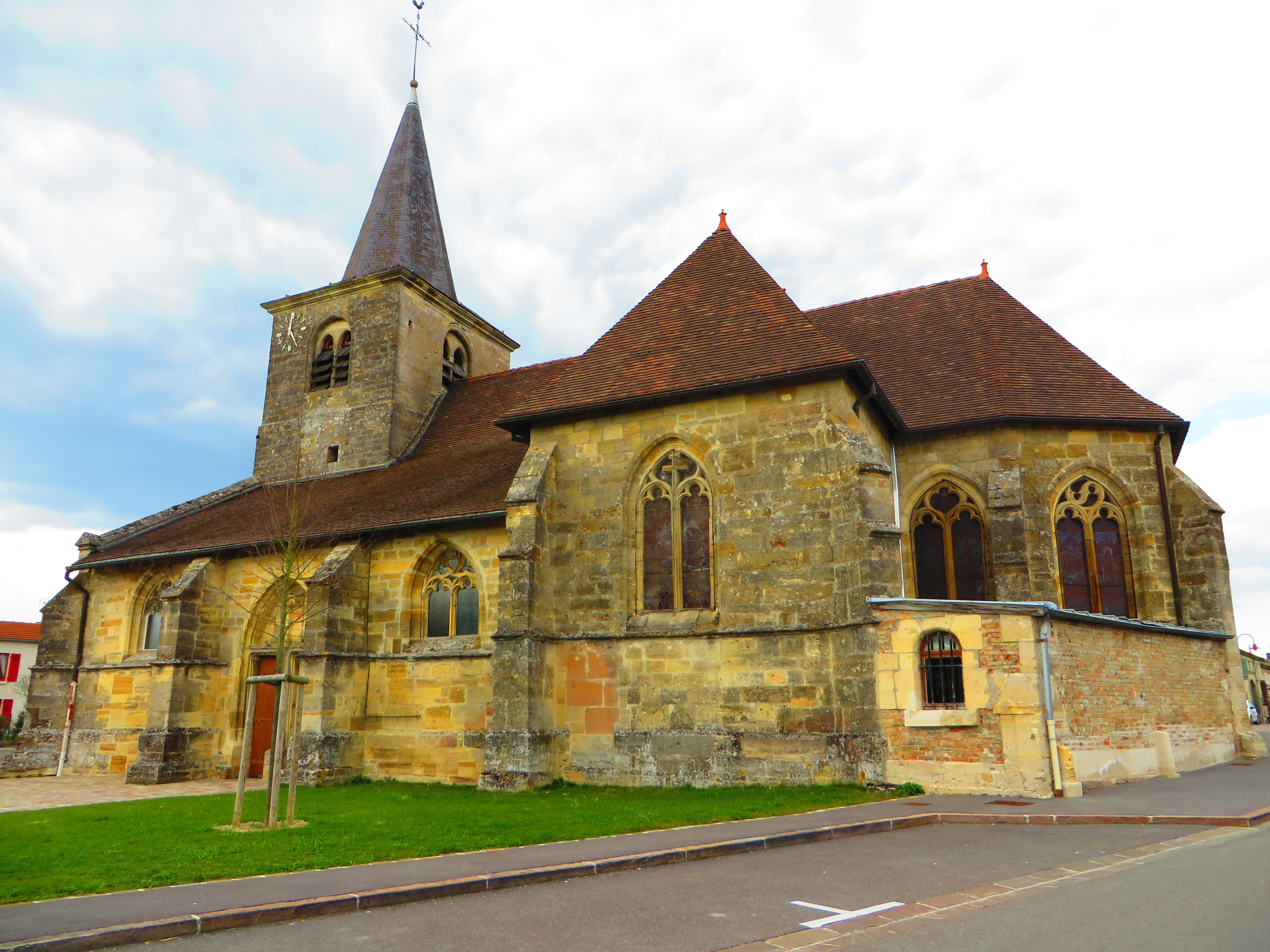
- The church in Laimont

- Coat of arms
- Location of Laimont
- Location within France Location within Grand Est
- Coordinates: 48°50′06″N 5°02′28″E
- Country: France
- Region: Grand Est
- Department: Meuse
- Arrondissement: Bar-le-Duc
- Canton: Revigny-sur-Ornain
- Intercommunality: pays de Revigny sur Ornain

Government
  - Mayor (2020–2026): Didier Laurent
- Area^{1}: 10.77 km^{2} (4.16 sq mi)
- Elevation: 208 m (682 ft)
- Highest elevation: 195 m (640 ft)
- Lowest elevation: 147 m (482 ft)
- Population (2023): 423
  - Density: 39.3/km^{2} (102/sq mi)
- Time zone: UTC+01:00 (CET)
  - Summer (DST): UTC+02:00 (CEST)
- INSEE/Postal code: 55272 /55800
- ^{1} French Land Register data, which excludes lakes, ponds, glaciers > 1 km^{2} (0.386 sq mi or 247 acres) and river estuaries.

Laimont (French pronunciation: [lɛmɔ̃]) is a commune in the Meuse department in Grand Est in north-eastern France.

== See also ==
- Communes of the Meuse department
