= Longeville-en-Barrois =

- Commune
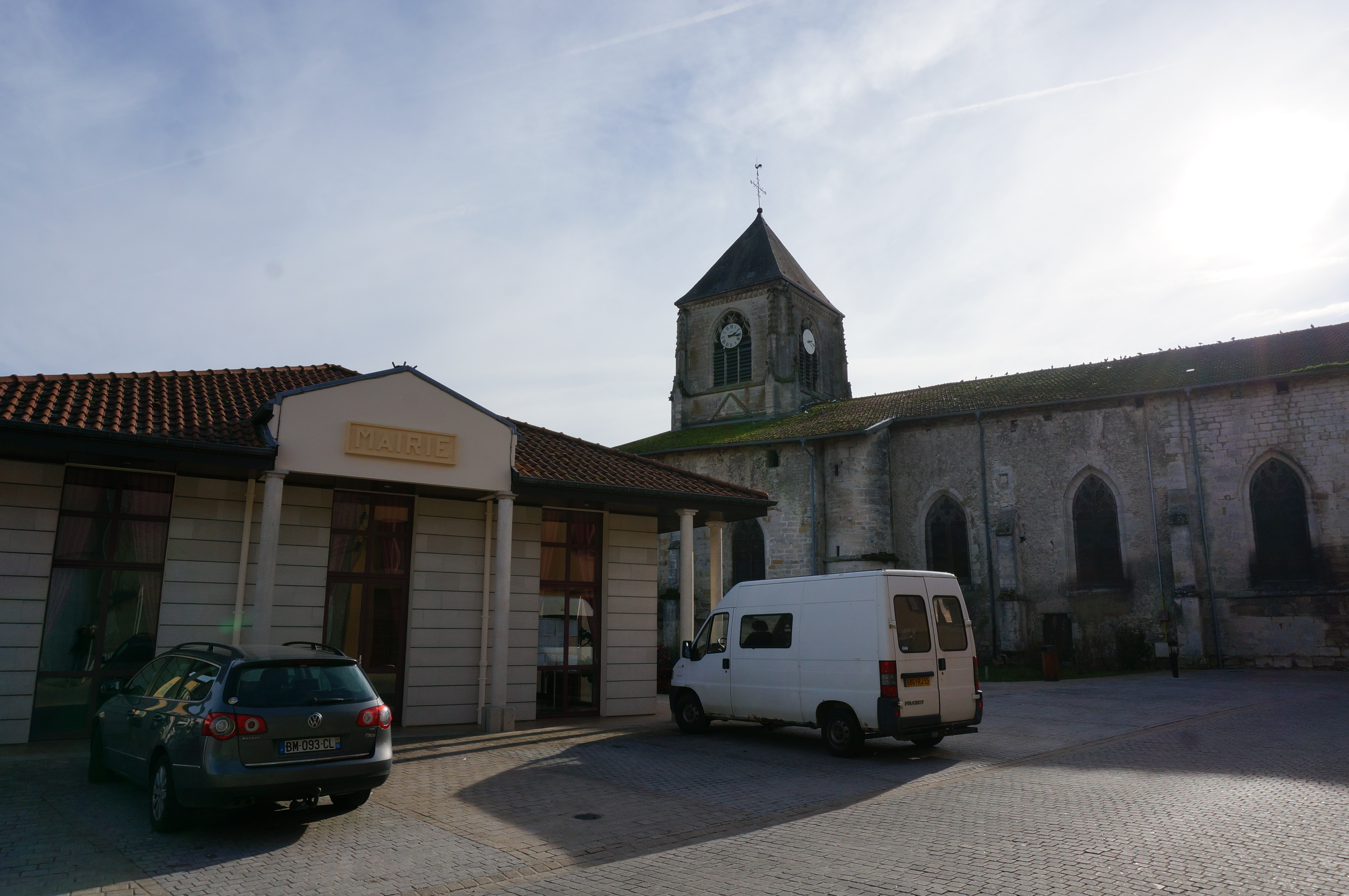
- The town hall and church in Longeville-en-Barrois

- Coat of arms
- Location of Longeville-en-Barrois
- Location within France Location within Grand Est
- Coordinates: 48°44′36″N 5°12′40″E
- Country: France
- Region: Grand Est
- Department: Meuse
- Arrondissement: Bar-le-Duc
- Canton: Bar-le-Duc-1
- Intercommunality: CA Bar-le-Duc - Sud Meuse

Government
  - Mayor (2020–2026): Lionel Beaufort
- Area^{1}: 15.44 km^{2} (5.96 sq mi)
- Elevation: 204 m (669 ft)
- Highest elevation: 337 m (1,106 ft)
- Lowest elevation: 187 m (614 ft)
- Population (2023): 1,081
  - Density: 70.01/km^{2} (181.3/sq mi)
- Time zone: UTC+01:00 (CET)
  - Summer (DST): UTC+02:00 (CEST)
- INSEE/Postal code: 55302 /55000
- ^{1} French Land Register data, which excludes lakes, ponds, glaciers > 1 km^{2} (0.386 sq mi or 247 acres) and river estuaries.

Longeville-en-Barrois (French pronunciation: [lɔ̃ʒvil ɑ̃ baʁwa], lit. 'Longeville in Barrois') is a commune in the Meuse department in Grand Est in north-eastern France.

== See also ==
- Communes of the Meuse department
