= Rancourt-sur-Ornain =

- Commune
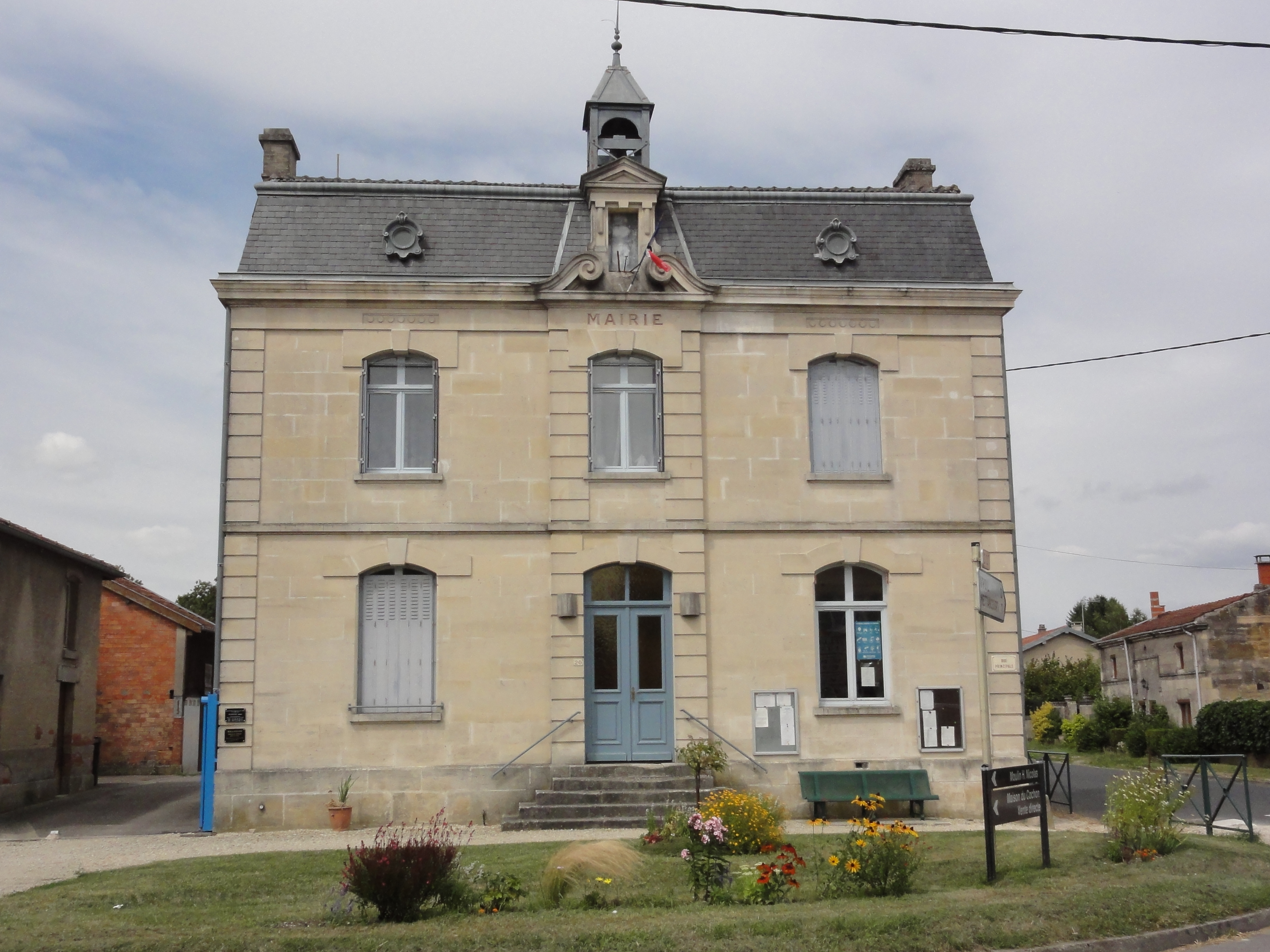
- The town hall in Rancourt-sur-Ornain

- Coat of arms
- Location of Rancourt-sur-Ornain
- Location within France Location within Grand Est
- Coordinates: 48°49′36″N 4°54′54″E
- Country: France
- Region: Grand Est
- Department: Meuse
- Arrondissement: Bar-le-Duc
- Canton: Revigny-sur-Ornain
- Intercommunality: CC du Pays de Revigny-sur-Ornain

Government
  - Mayor (2020–2026): Christian Michel
- Area^{1}: 9.99 km^{2} (3.86 sq mi)
- Elevation: 120 m (390 ft)
- Highest elevation: 138 m (453 ft)
- Lowest elevation: 124 m (407 ft)
- Population (2023): 180
  - Density: 18/km^{2} (47/sq mi)
- Time zone: UTC+01:00 (CET)
  - Summer (DST): UTC+02:00 (CEST)
- INSEE/Postal code: 55414 /55800
- ^{1} French Land Register data, which excludes lakes, ponds, glaciers > 1 km^{2} (0.386 sq mi or 247 acres) and river estuaries.

Rancourt-sur-Ornain (French pronunciation: [ʁɑ̃kuʁ syʁ ɔʁnɛ̃], literally Rancourt on Ornain) is a commune in the Meuse department in Grand Est in north-eastern France.

Rancourt-sur-Ornain is home to the Church of Saint Médard, a historic religious building whose main construction phases date to the late 15th and early 16th centuries. The building incorporates remains of an earlier structure dating from the late 12th or early 13th century and was designated a Monument historique in 1994. According to the INSEE, the commune had a municipal population of 180 in 2023.

== See also ==
- Communes of the Meuse department
