= Val-d'Ornain =

- Commune
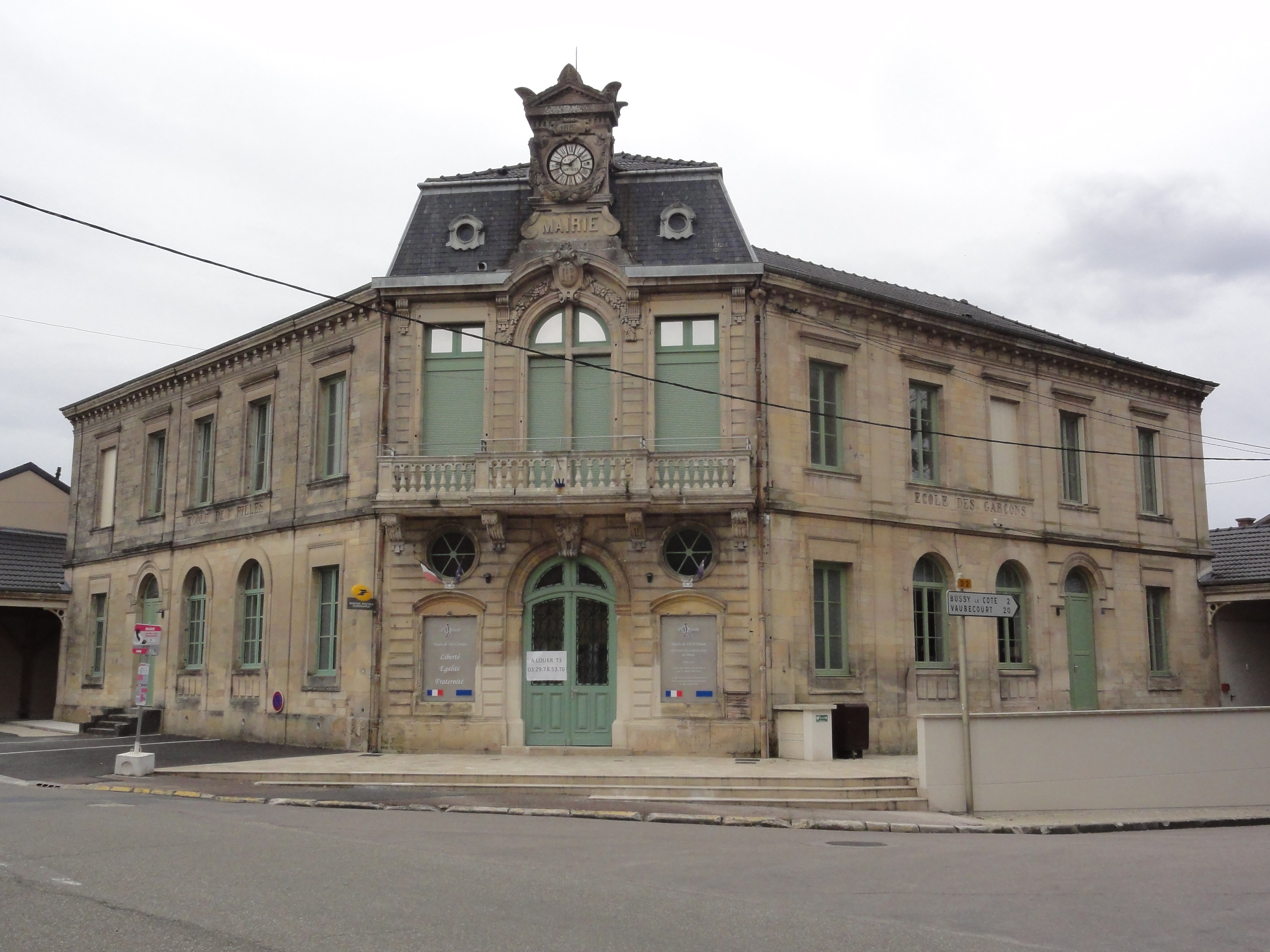
- The town hall in Val-d'Ornain

- Coat of arms
- Location of Val-d'Ornain
- Location within France Location within Grand Est
- Coordinates: 48°48′09″N 5°04′10″E
- Country: France
- Region: Grand Est
- Department: Meuse
- Arrondissement: Bar-le-Duc
- Canton: Revigny-sur-Ornain
- Intercommunality: CA Bar-le-Duc - Sud Meuse

Government
  - Mayor (2020–2026): Jean-Paul Regnier
- Area^{1}: 24.16 km^{2} (9.33 sq mi)
- Elevation: 166 m (545 ft)
- Highest elevation: 249 m (817 ft)
- Lowest elevation: 159 m (522 ft)
- Population (2023): 952
  - Density: 39.4/km^{2} (102/sq mi)
- Time zone: UTC+01:00 (CET)
  - Summer (DST): UTC+02:00 (CEST)
- INSEE/Postal code: 55366 /55000
- ^{1} French Land Register data, which excludes lakes, ponds, glaciers > 1 km^{2} (0.386 sq mi or 247 acres) and river estuaries.

Val-d'Ornain (French pronunciation: [val dɔʁnɛ̃]; lit. 'Vale of Ornain') is a commune in the Meuse department in Grand Est in northeastern France.

The commune was formed by the fusion of the three villages of Mussey, Bussy-la-Côte and Varney in January 1973.

== See also ==
- Communes of the Meuse department
