= Neuville-sur-Ornain =

- Commune
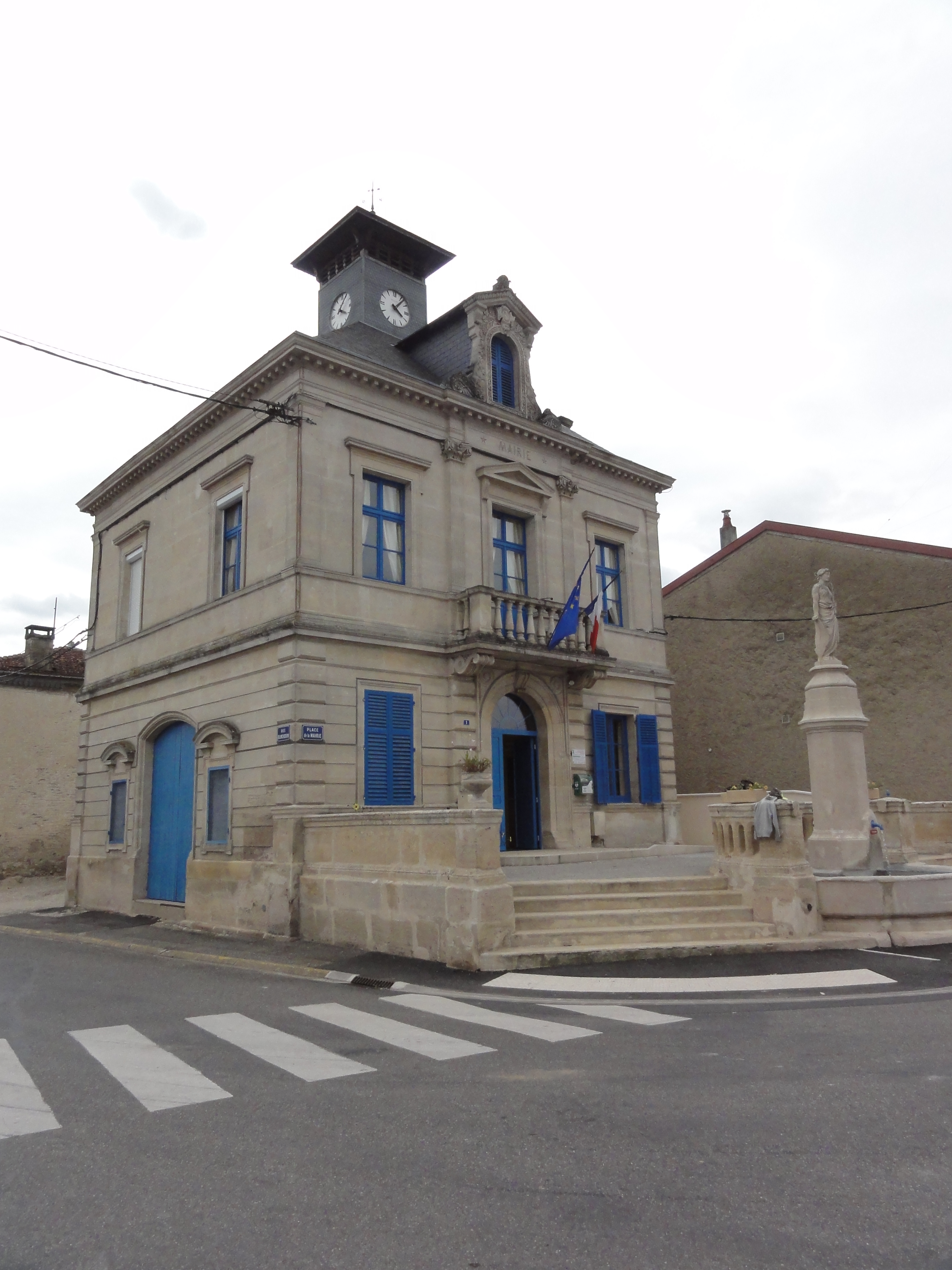
- The town hall in Neuville-sur-Ornain

- Coat of arms
- Location of Neuville-sur-Ornain
- Location within France Location within Grand Est
- Coordinates: 48°49′24″N 5°02′50″E
- Country: France
- Region: Grand Est
- Department: Meuse
- Arrondissement: Bar-le-Duc
- Canton: Revigny-sur-Ornain
- Intercommunality: CC du Pays de Revigny-sur-Ornain

Government
  - Mayor (2020–2026): Christophe Maginot
- Area^{1}: 11.66 km^{2} (4.50 sq mi)
- Elevation: 1,158 m (3,799 ft)
- Highest elevation: 199 m (653 ft)
- Lowest elevation: 149 m (489 ft)
- Population (2023): 365
  - Density: 31.3/km^{2} (81.1/sq mi)
- Time zone: UTC+01:00 (CET)
  - Summer (DST): UTC+02:00 (CEST)
- INSEE/Postal code: 55382 /55800
- ^{1} French Land Register data, which excludes lakes, ponds, glaciers > 1 km^{2} (0.386 sq mi or 247 acres) and river estuaries.

Neuville-sur-Ornain (French pronunciation: [nøvil syʁ ɔʁnɛ̃]) is a commune in the Meuse department in Grand Est in north-eastern France.

== See also ==
- Communes of the Meuse department
