= Remennecourt =

- Commune
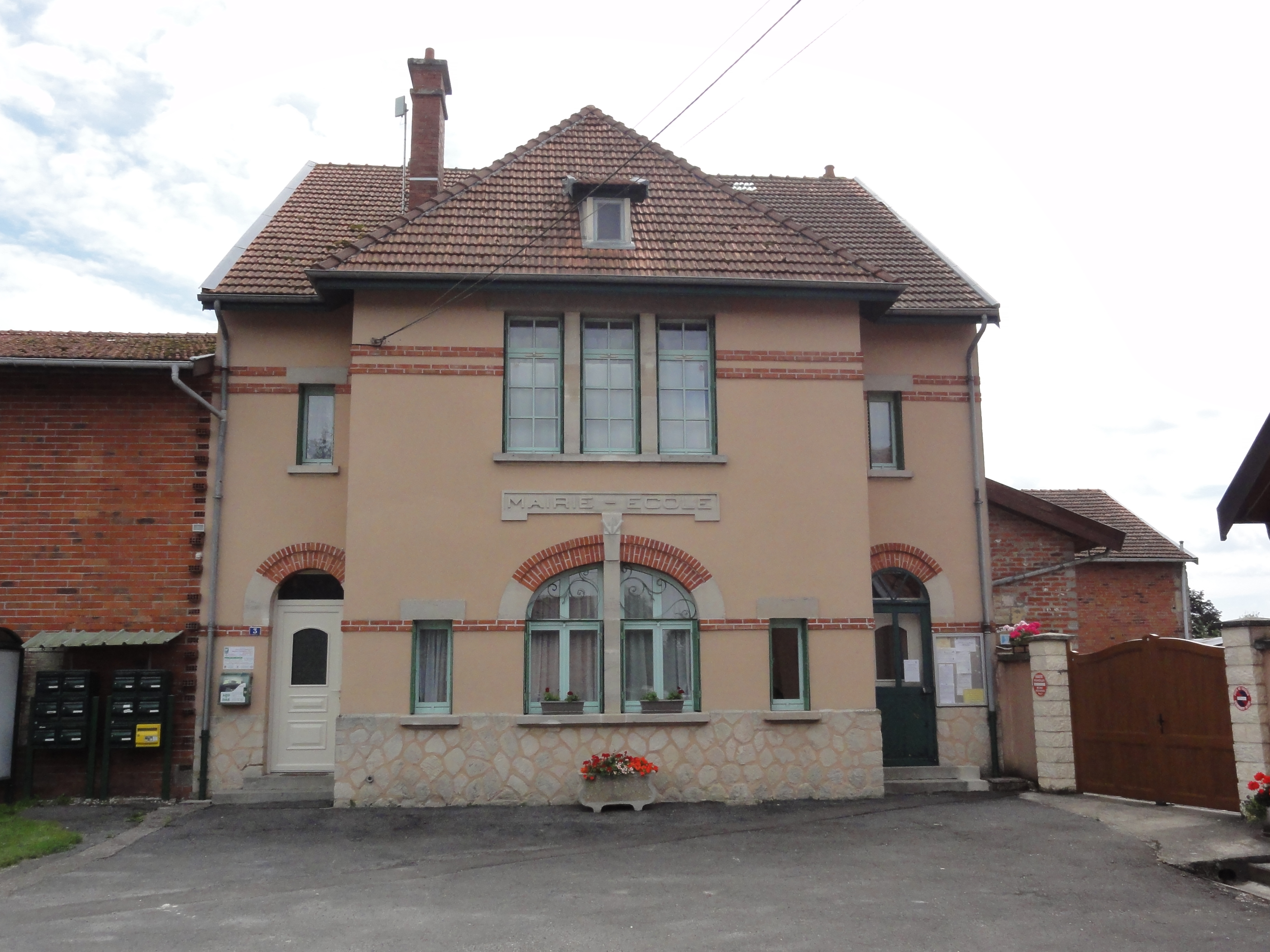
- The town hall in Remennecourt

- Coat of arms
- Location of Remennecourt
- Location within France Location within Grand Est
- Coordinates: 48°48′09″N 4°55′13″E
- Country: France
- Region: Grand Est
- Department: Meuse
- Arrondissement: Bar-le-Duc
- Canton: Revigny-sur-Ornain
- Intercommunality: CC du pays de Revigny sur Ornain

Government
  - Mayor (2020–2026): Anne Roussel
- Area^{1}: 2.74 km^{2} (1.06 sq mi)
- Elevation: 129 m (423 ft)
- Highest elevation: 133 m (436 ft)
- Lowest elevation: 124 m (407 ft)
- Population (2023): 43
  - Density: 16/km^{2} (41/sq mi)
- Time zone: UTC+01:00 (CET)
  - Summer (DST): UTC+02:00 (CEST)
- INSEE/Postal code: 55424 /55800
- ^{1} French Land Register data, which excludes lakes, ponds, glaciers > 1 km^{2} (0.386 sq mi or 247 acres) and river estuaries.

Remennecourt (French pronunciation: [ʁəmɛnkuʁ]) is a commune in the Meuse department in Grand Est in north-eastern France.

== See also ==
- Communes of the Meuse department
