= Courcelles-sur-Aire =

- Commune
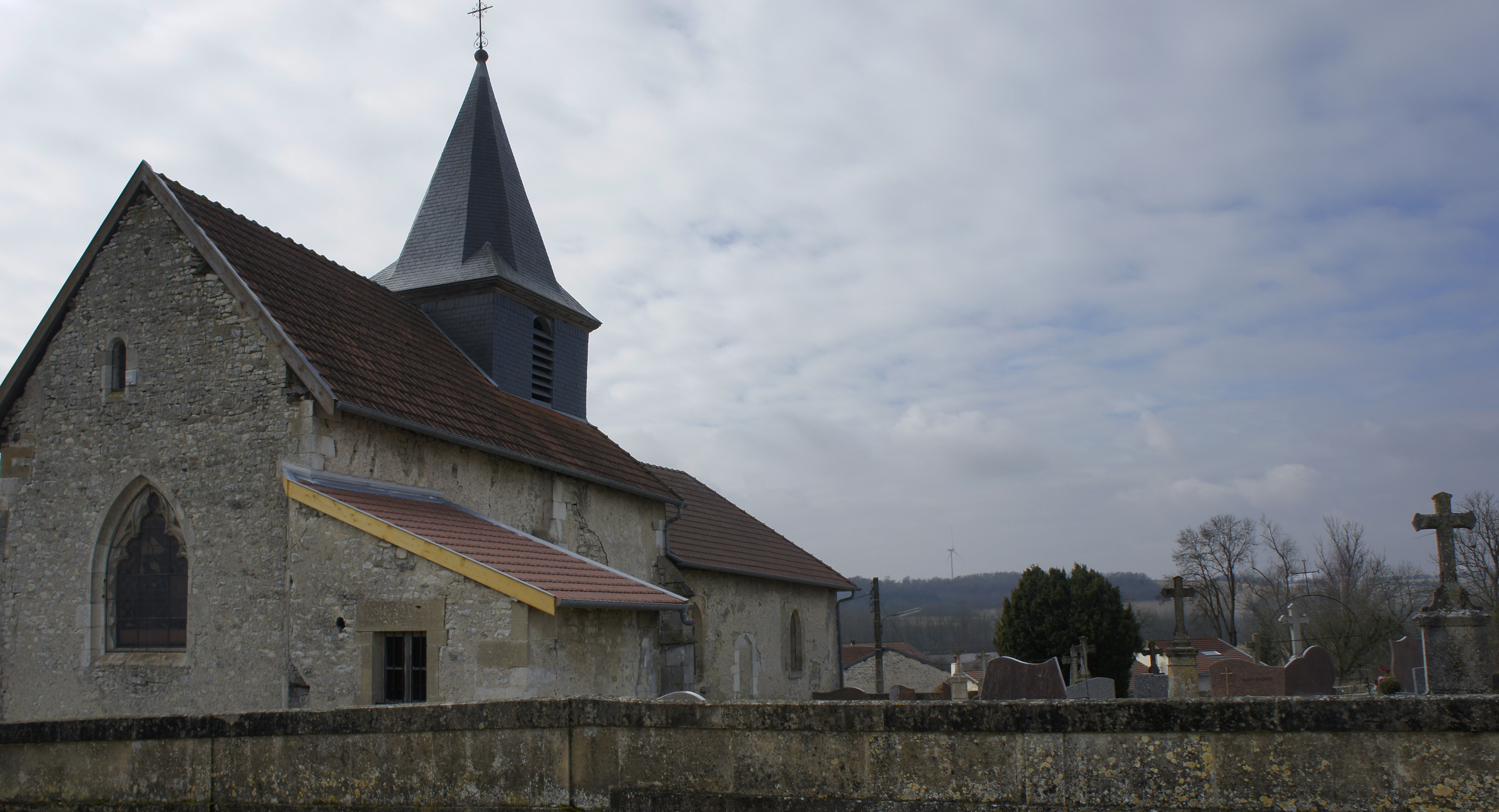
- The church in Courcelles-sur-Aire

- Coat of arms
- Location of Courcelles-sur-Aire
- Location within France Location within Grand Est
- Coordinates: 48°56′15″N 5°14′38″E
- Country: France
- Region: Grand Est
- Department: Meuse
- Arrondissement: Bar-le-Duc
- Canton: Revigny-sur-Ornain
- Intercommunality: CC de l'Aire à l'Argonne

Government
  - Mayor (2020–2026): Gérard L'Huillier
- Area^{1}: 11.93 km^{2} (4.61 sq mi)
- Elevation: 287 m (942 ft)
- Highest elevation: 331 m (1,086 ft)
- Lowest elevation: 226 m (741 ft)
- Population (2023): 43
  - Density: 3.6/km^{2} (9.3/sq mi)
- Time zone: UTC+01:00 (CET)
  - Summer (DST): UTC+02:00 (CEST)
- INSEE/Postal code: 55128 /55260
- ^{1} French Land Register data, which excludes lakes, ponds, glaciers > 1 km^{2} (0.386 sq mi or 247 acres) and river estuaries.

Courcelles-sur-Aire (French pronunciation: [kuʁsɛl syʁ ɛːʁ]; literally "Courcelles on Aire") is a commune in the Meuse department in Grand Est in north-eastern France.

== See also ==
- Communes of the Meuse department
