= Nançois-sur-Ornain =

- Commune
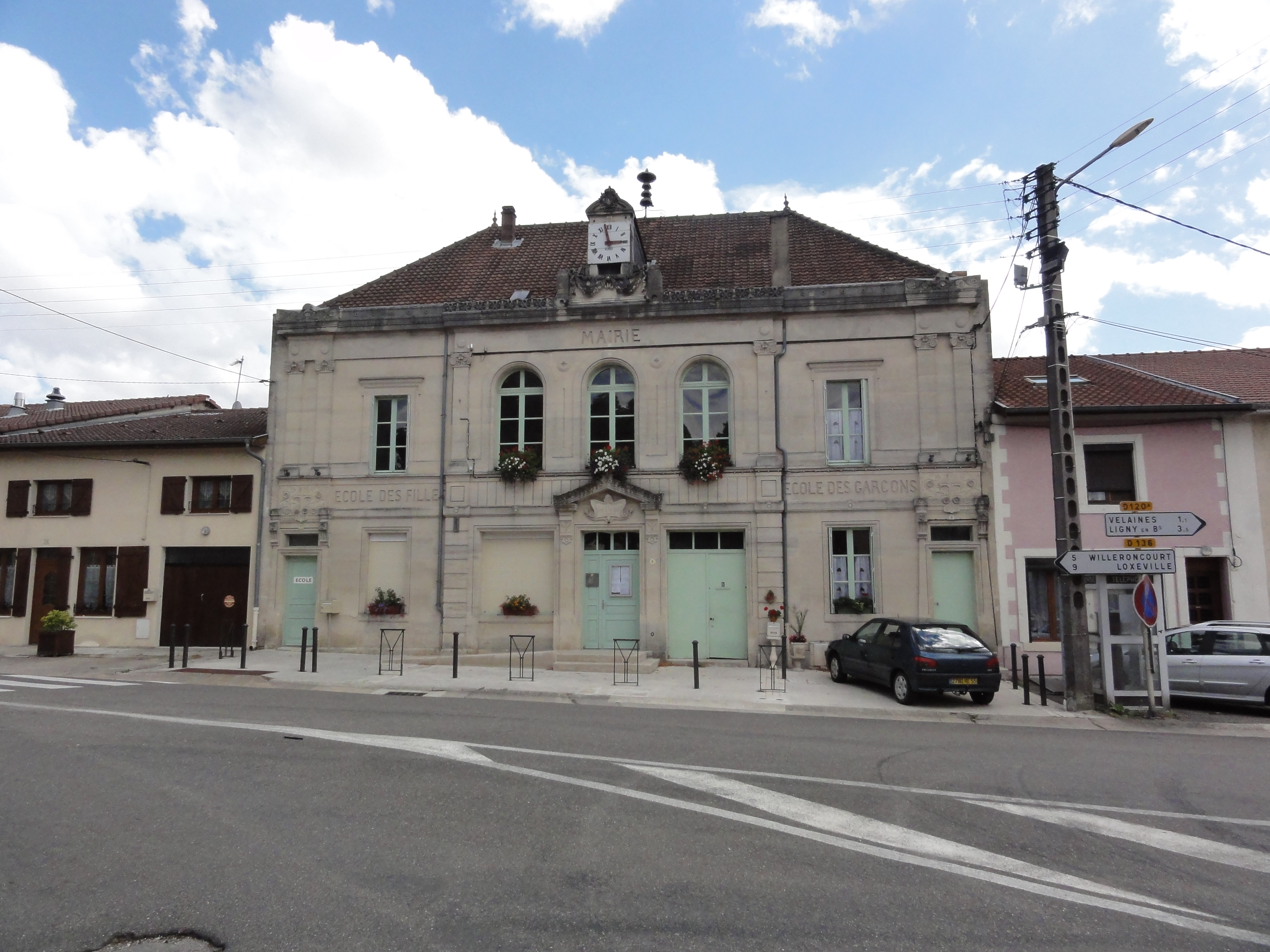
- The town hall in Nançois-sur-Ornain

- Coat of arms
- Location of Nançois-sur-Ornain
- Location within France Location within Grand Est
- Coordinates: 48°42′47″N 5°18′04″E
- Country: France
- Region: Grand Est
- Department: Meuse
- Arrondissement: Bar-le-Duc
- Canton: Vaucouleurs
- Intercommunality: CA Bar-le-Duc - Sud Meuse

Government
  - Mayor (2020–2026): Sylvain Gillet
- Area^{1}: 7.98 km^{2} (3.08 sq mi)
- Elevation: 216 m (709 ft)
- Highest elevation: 364 m (1,194 ft)
- Lowest elevation: 212 m (696 ft)
- Population (2023): 359
  - Density: 45.0/km^{2} (117/sq mi)
- Time zone: UTC+01:00 (CET)
  - Summer (DST): UTC+02:00 (CEST)
- INSEE/Postal code: 55372 /55500
- ^{1} French Land Register data, which excludes lakes, ponds, glaciers > 1 km^{2} (0.386 sq mi or 247 acres) and river estuaries.

Nançois-sur-Ornain (French pronunciation: [nɑ̃swa syʁ ɔʁnɛ̃], literally Nançois on Ornain) is a commune in the Meuse department in Grand Est in north-eastern France.

== See also ==
- Communes of the Meuse department
