= Naix-aux-Forges =

- Commune
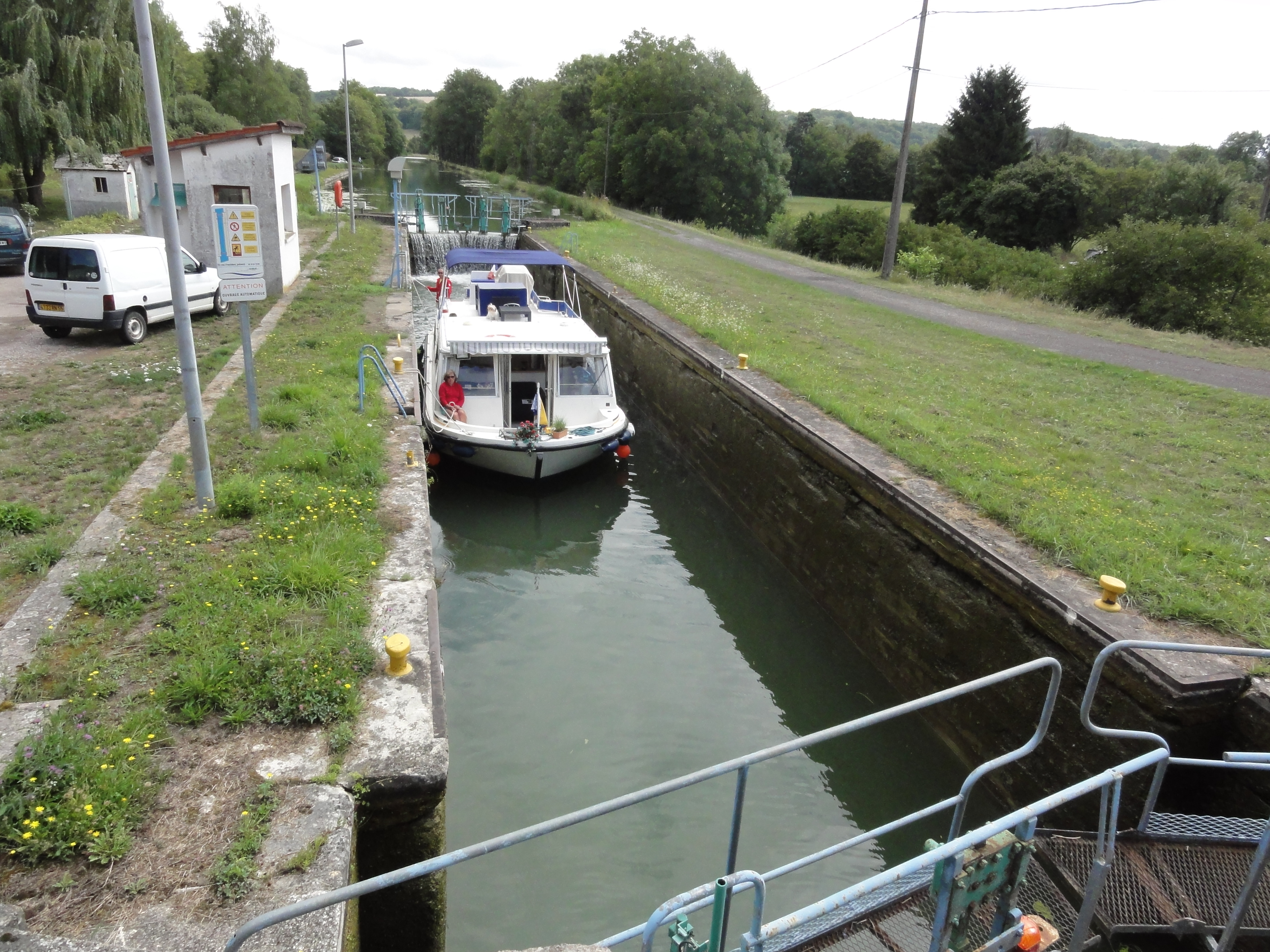
- Lock 15 of the Marne-Rhine Canal in Naix-aux-Forges

- Coat of arms
- Location of Naix-aux-Forges
- Location within France Location within Grand Est
- Coordinates: 48°38′14″N 5°22′40″E
- Country: France
- Region: Grand Est
- Department: Meuse
- Arrondissement: Bar-le-Duc
- Canton: Ligny-en-Barrois
- Intercommunality: CA Bar-le-Duc - Sud Meuse

Government
  - Mayor (2020–2026): Philippe Gerard
- Area^{1}: 6.32 km^{2} (2.44 sq mi)
- Elevation: 248 m (814 ft)
- Highest elevation: 359 m (1,178 ft)
- Lowest elevation: 234 m (768 ft)
- Population (2023): 179
  - Density: 28.3/km^{2} (73.4/sq mi)
- Time zone: UTC+01:00 (CET)
  - Summer (DST): UTC+02:00 (CEST)
- INSEE/Postal code: 55370 /55500
- ^{1} French Land Register data, which excludes lakes, ponds, glaciers > 1 km^{2} (0.386 sq mi or 247 acres) and river estuaries.

Naix-aux-Forges (French pronunciation: [nɛ o fɔʁʒ]) is a commune in the Meuse department in Grand Est in north-eastern France.

== See also ==
- Communes of the Meuse department
