= Chanteraine =

- Commune
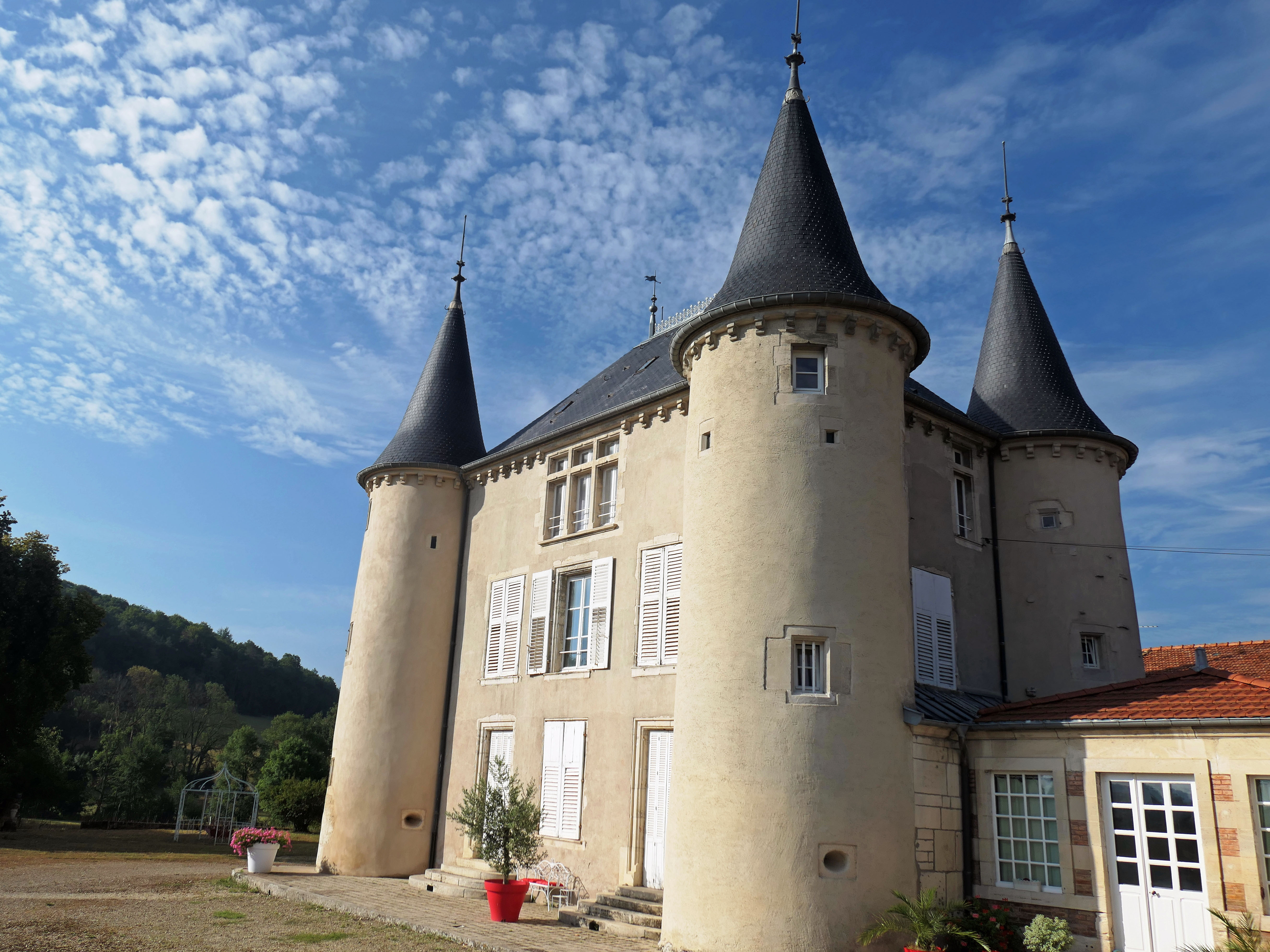

- Coat of arms
- Location of Chanteraine
- Location within France Location within Grand Est
- Coordinates: 48°40′52″N 5°22′15″E
- Country: France
- Region: Grand Est
- Department: Meuse
- Arrondissement: Bar-le-Duc
- Canton: Ligny-en-Barrois
- Intercommunality: CA Bar-le-Duc - Sud Meuse

Government
  - Mayor (2020–2026): Michel Lagabe
- Area^{1}: 22.4 km^{2} (8.6 sq mi)
- Elevation: 300 m (980 ft)
- Highest elevation: 391 m (1,283 ft)
- Lowest elevation: 238 m (781 ft)
- Population (2023): 187
  - Density: 8.35/km^{2} (21.6/sq mi)
- Time zone: UTC+01:00 (CET)
  - Summer (DST): UTC+02:00 (CEST)
- INSEE/Postal code: 55358 /55500
- ^{1} French Land Register data, which excludes lakes, ponds, glaciers > 1 km^{2} (0.386 sq mi or 247 acres) and river estuaries.

Chanteraine (French pronunciation: [ʃɑ̃tʁɛn]) is a commune in the Meuse department in Grand Est in north-eastern France.

== See also ==
- Communes of the Meuse department
