= Longeaux =

- Commune
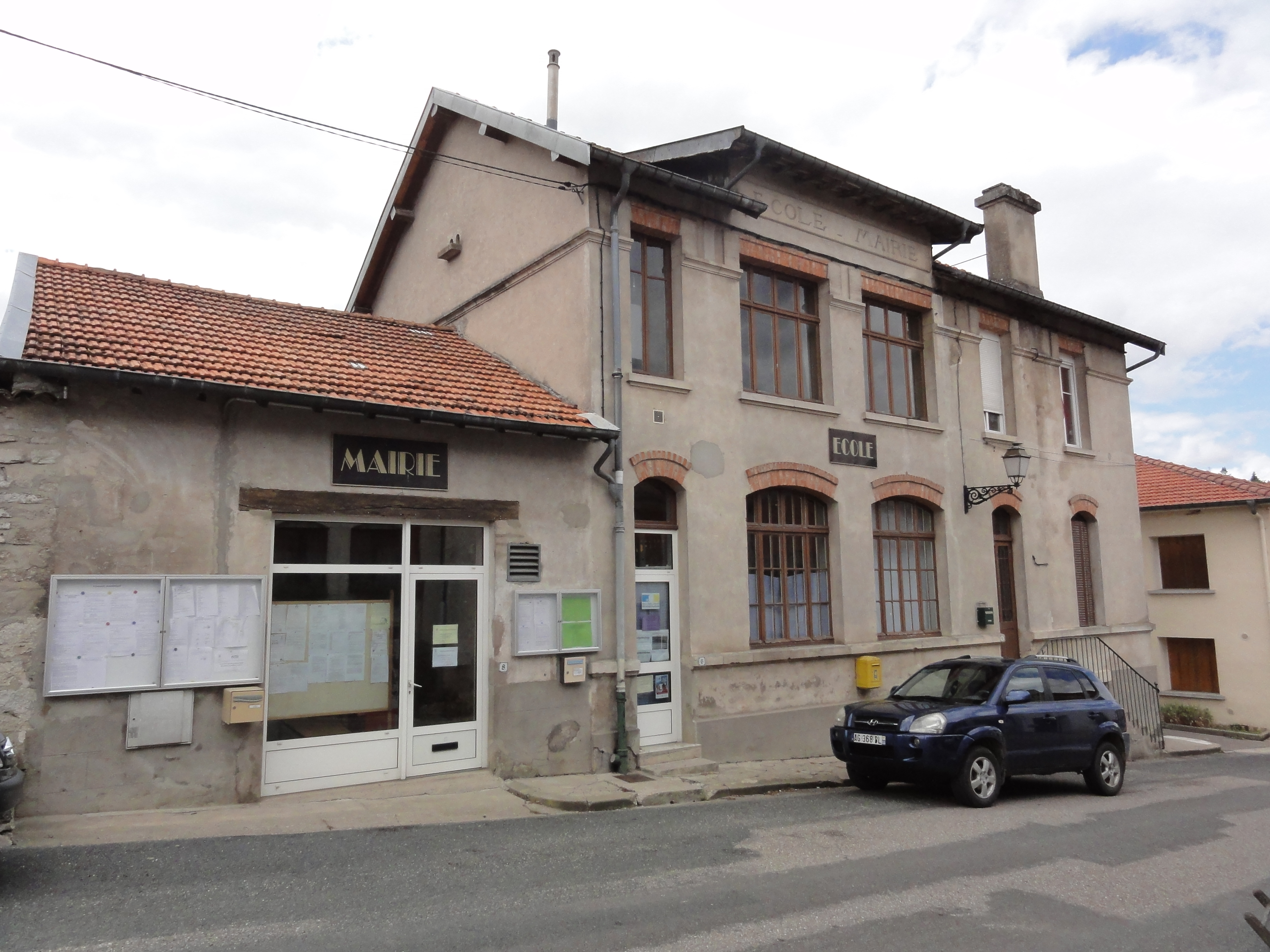
- The town hall in Longeaux

- Coat of arms
- Location of Longeaux
- Location within France Location within Grand Est
- Coordinates: 48°38′51″N 5°20′28″E
- Country: France
- Region: Grand Est
- Department: Meuse
- Arrondissement: Bar-le-Duc
- Canton: Ligny-en-Barrois
- Intercommunality: CA Bar-le-Duc - Sud Meuse

Government
  - Mayor (2020–2026): Loup Knavié
- Area^{1}: 7.49 km^{2} (2.89 sq mi)
- Elevation: 240 m (790 ft)
- Highest elevation: 347 m (1,138 ft)
- Lowest elevation: 228 m (748 ft)
- Population (2023): 219
  - Density: 29.2/km^{2} (75.7/sq mi)
- Time zone: UTC+01:00 (CET)
  - Summer (DST): UTC+02:00 (CEST)
- INSEE/Postal code: 55300 /55500
- ^{1} French Land Register data, which excludes lakes, ponds, glaciers > 1 km^{2} (0.386 sq mi or 247 acres) and river estuaries.

Longeaux (French pronunciation: [lɔ̃ʒo]) is a commune in the Meuse department in Grand Est in north-eastern France.

== See also ==
- Communes of the Meuse department
