= Salmagne =

- Commune
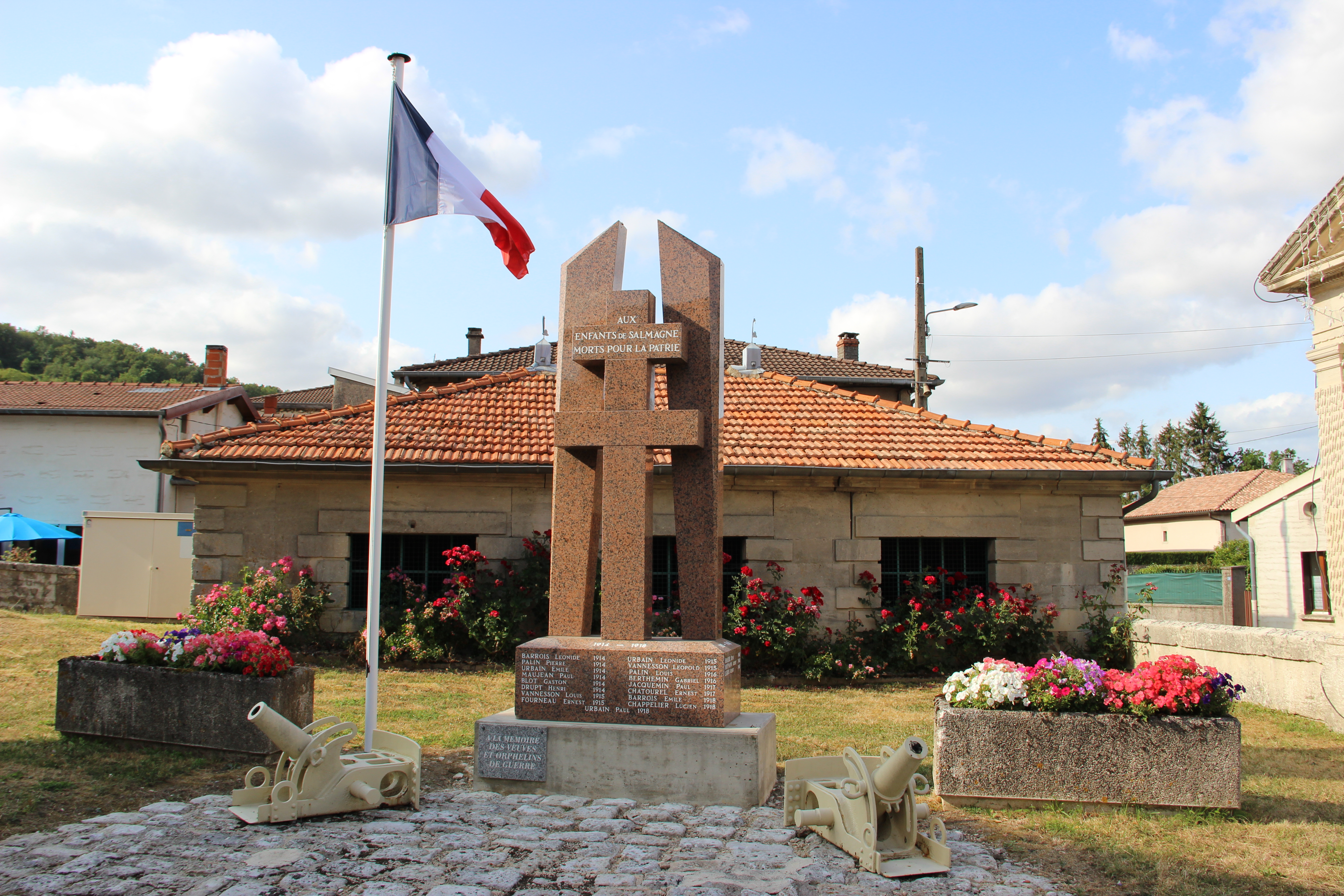
- The war memorial in Salmagne

- Coat of arms
- Location of Salmagne
- Location within France Location within Grand Est
- Coordinates: 48°45′10″N 5°19′32″E
- Country: France
- Region: Grand Est
- Department: Meuse
- Arrondissement: Bar-le-Duc
- Canton: Vaucouleurs
- Intercommunality: CA Bar-le-Duc - Sud Meuse

Government
  - Mayor (2020–2026): Céline Mayeur
- Area^{1}: 16.73 km^{2} (6.46 sq mi)
- Elevation: 389 m (1,276 ft)
- Highest elevation: 382 m (1,253 ft)
- Lowest elevation: 229 m (751 ft)
- Population (2023): 281
  - Density: 16.8/km^{2} (43.5/sq mi)
- Time zone: UTC+01:00 (CET)
  - Summer (DST): UTC+02:00 (CEST)
- INSEE/Postal code: 55466 /55000
- ^{1} French Land Register data, which excludes lakes, ponds, glaciers > 1 km^{2} (0.386 sq mi or 247 acres) and river estuaries.

Salmagne (French pronunciation: [salmaɲ]) is a commune in the Meuse department in Grand Est in north-eastern France.

== See also ==
- Communes of the Meuse department
