= Andernay =

- Commune
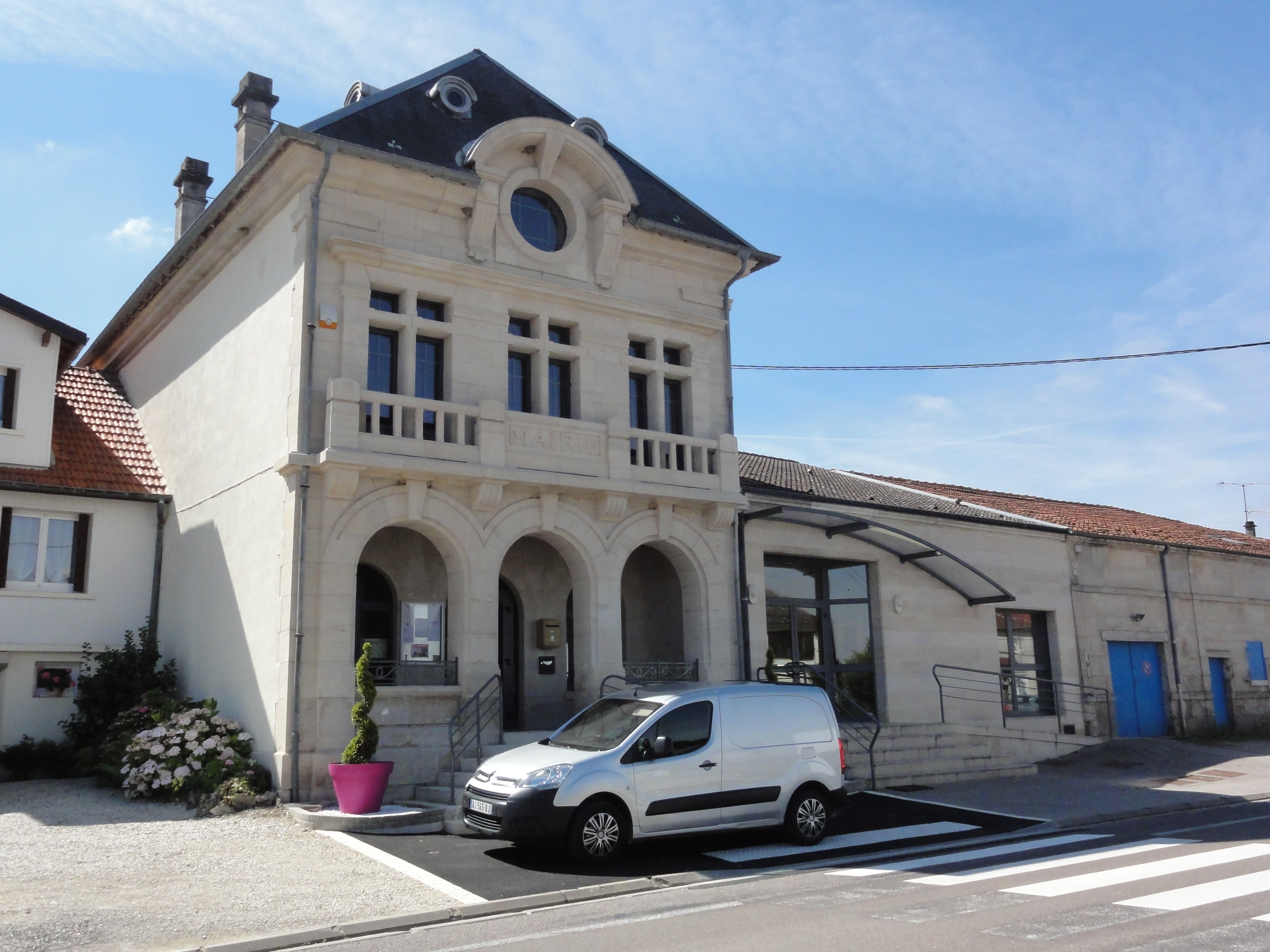
- The town hall in Andernay

- Coat of arms
- Location of Andernay
- Location within France Location within Grand Est
- Coordinates: 48°47′31″N 4°57′21″E
- Country: France
- Region: Grand Est
- Department: Meuse
- Arrondissement: Bar-le-Duc
- Canton: Revigny-sur-Ornain
- Intercommunality: Pays de Revigny-sur-Ornain

Government
  - Mayor (2024–2026): Guy Prevot
- Area^{1}: 4.32 km^{2} (1.67 sq mi)
- Elevation: 153 m (502 ft)
- Highest elevation: 185 m (607 ft)
- Lowest elevation: 131 m (430 ft)
- Population (2023): 236
  - Density: 54.6/km^{2} (141/sq mi)
- Time zone: UTC+01:00 (CET)
  - Summer (DST): UTC+02:00 (CEST)
- INSEE/Postal code: 55011 /55800
- ^{1} French Land Register data, which excludes lakes, ponds, glaciers > 1 km^{2} (0.386 sq mi or 247 acres) and river estuaries.

Andernay (French pronunciation: [ɑ̃dɛʁnɛ]) is a commune in the Meuse department in the Grand Est region in northeastern France.

== Population ==
Historical population
Year	Pop.	±% p.a.
1968	158	—
1975	204	+3.72%
1982	224	+1.35%
1990	229	+0.28%
1999	228	−0.05%
2007	240	+0.64%
2012	247	+0.58%
2017	258	+0.88%
2023	236	−1.47%
Source: INSEE

== See also ==
- Communes of the Meuse department
