= Saint-Amand-sur-Ornain =

- Commune
- Coat of arms
- Location of Saint-Amand-sur-Ornain
- Location within France Location within Grand Est
- Coordinates: 48°37′41″N 5°23′16″E
- Country: France
- Region: Grand Est
- Department: Meuse
- Arrondissement: Bar-le-Duc
- Canton: Ligny-en-Barrois
- Intercommunality: CA Bar-le-Duc - Sud Meuse

Government
  - Mayor (2020–2026): François Gatinois
- Area^{1}: 6.06 km^{2} (2.34 sq mi)
- Elevation: 247 m (810 ft)
- Highest elevation: 386 m (1,266 ft)
- Lowest elevation: 244 m (801 ft)
- Population (2023): 60
  - Density: 9.9/km^{2} (26/sq mi)
- Time zone: UTC+01:00 (CET)
  - Summer (DST): UTC+02:00 (CEST)
- INSEE/Postal code: 55452 /55500
- ^{1} French Land Register data, which excludes lakes, ponds, glaciers > 1 km^{2} (0.386 sq mi or 247 acres) and river estuaries.

Saint-Amand-sur-Ornain (French pronunciation: [sɛ̃.t‿amɑ̃ syʁ ɔʁnɛ̃], literally Saint-Amand on Ornain) is a commune in the Meuse department in Grand Est in north-eastern France.

== See also ==
- Communes of the Meuse department
