= Trémont-sur-Saulx =

- Commune
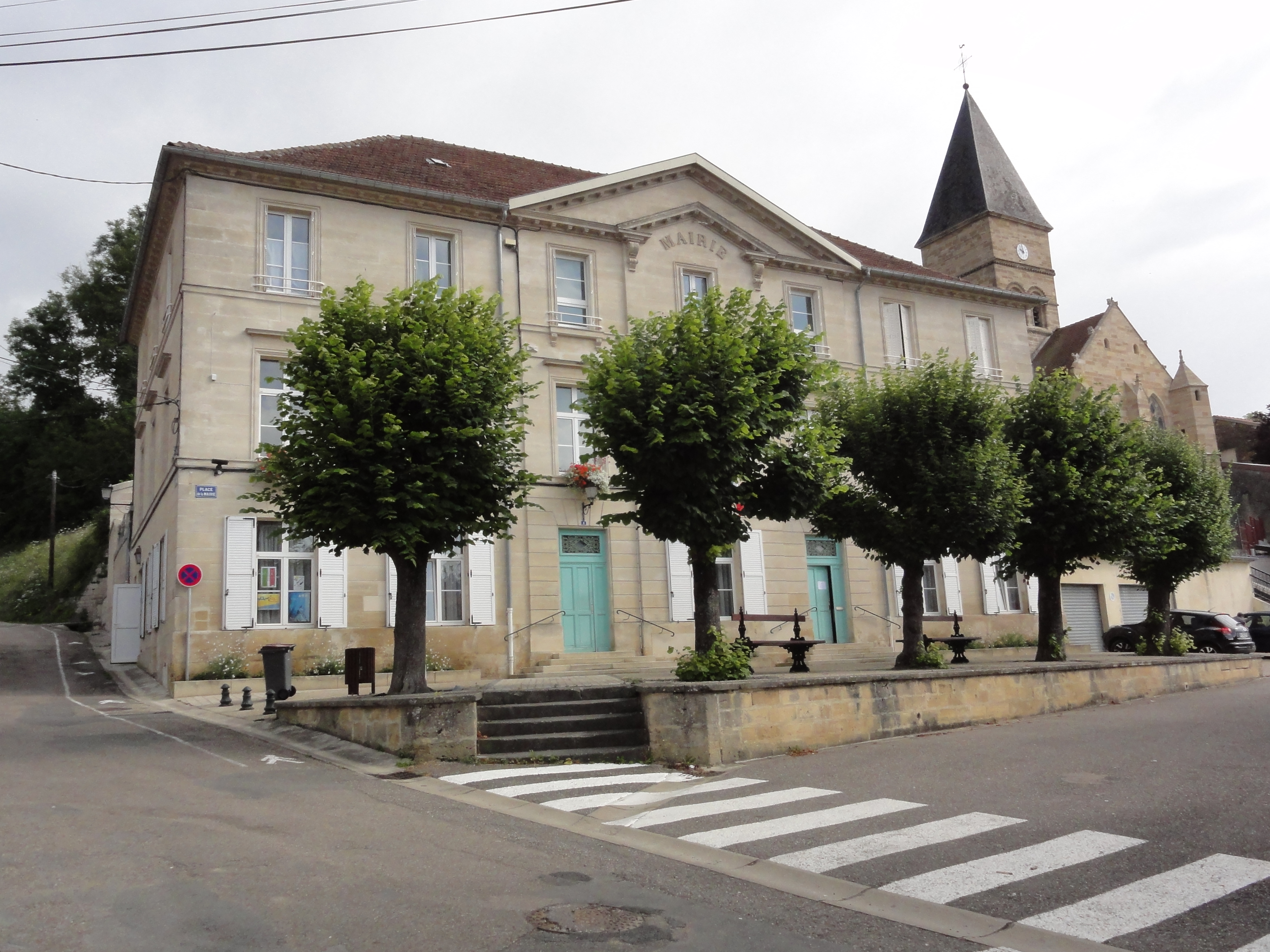
- The town hall in Trémont-sur-Saulx

- Coat of arms
- Location of Trémont-sur-Saulx
- Location within France Location within Grand Est
- Coordinates: 48°44′56″N 5°03′23″E
- Country: France
- Region: Grand Est
- Department: Meuse
- Arrondissement: Bar-le-Duc
- Canton: Bar-le-Duc-1
- Intercommunality: CA Bar-le-Duc - Sud Meuse

Government
  - Mayor (2020–2026): Didier Sugg
- Area^{1}: 11.9 km^{2} (4.6 sq mi)
- Elevation: 164 m (538 ft)
- Highest elevation: 248 m (814 ft)
- Lowest elevation: 157 m (515 ft)
- Population (2023): 554
  - Density: 46.6/km^{2} (121/sq mi)
- Time zone: UTC+01:00 (CET)
  - Summer (DST): UTC+02:00 (CEST)
- INSEE/Postal code: 55514 /55000
- ^{1} French Land Register data, which excludes lakes, ponds, glaciers > 1 km^{2} (0.386 sq mi or 247 acres) and river estuaries.

Trémont-sur-Saulx (French pronunciation: [tʁemɔ̃ syʁ so], literally Trémont on Saulx) is a commune in the Meuse department in Grand Est in north-eastern France.

== See also ==
- Communes of the Meuse department
