= Naives-Rosières =

- Commune
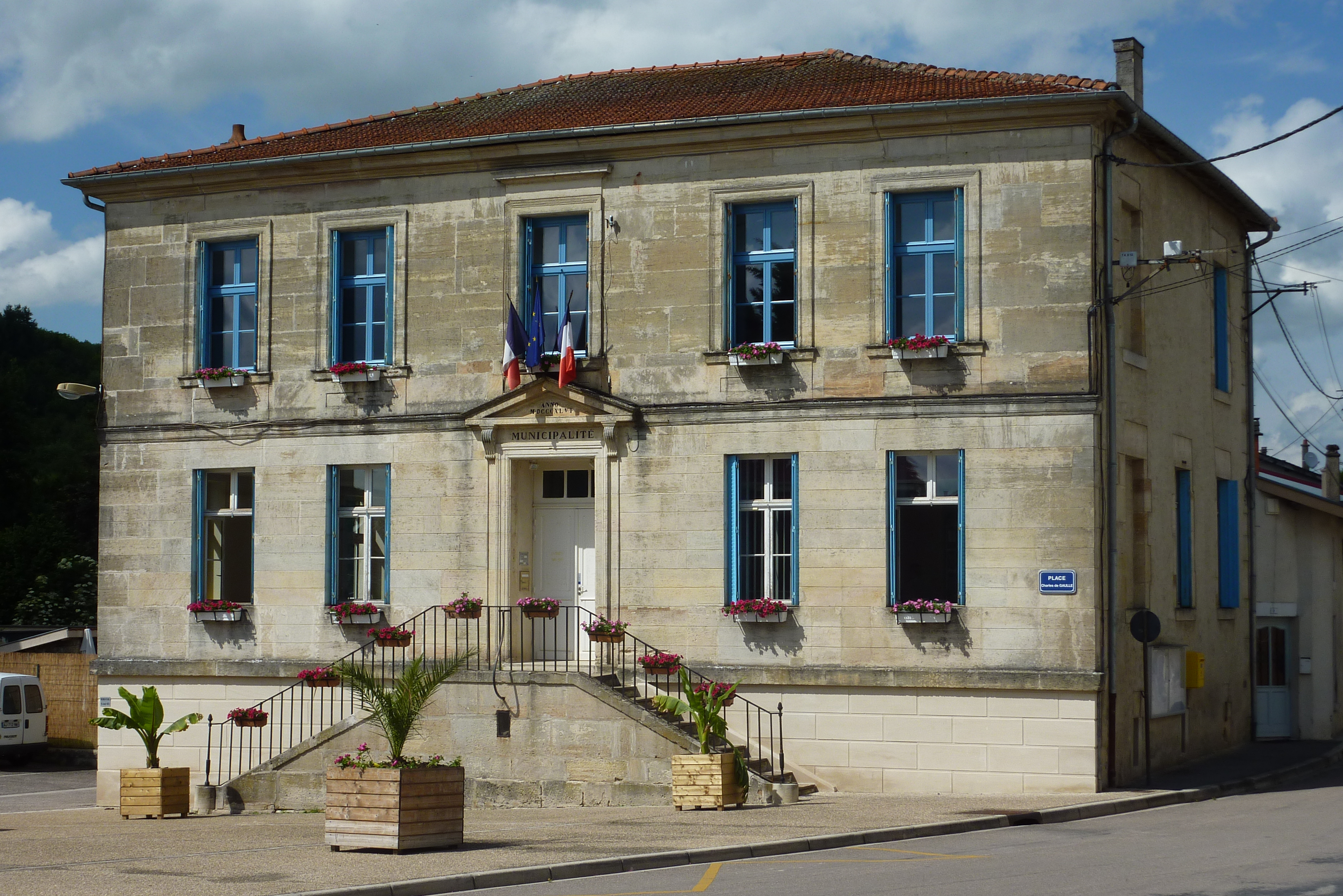
- Town hall of Naives-Rosières

- Coat of arms
- Location of Naives-Rosières
- Location within France Location within Grand Est
- Coordinates: 48°47′45″N 5°13′00″E
- Country: France
- Region: Grand Est
- Department: Meuse
- Arrondissement: Bar-le-Duc
- Canton: Bar-le-Duc-1
- Intercommunality: CA Bar-le-Duc - Sud Meuse

Government
  - Mayor (2020–2026): Anthony Yung
- Area^{1}: 15.93 km^{2} (6.15 sq mi)
- Elevation: 213 m (699 ft)
- Highest elevation: 347 m (1,138 ft)
- Lowest elevation: 205 m (673 ft)
- Population (2023): 809
  - Density: 50.8/km^{2} (132/sq mi)
- Time zone: UTC+01:00 (CET)
  - Summer (DST): UTC+02:00 (CEST)
- INSEE/Postal code: 55369 /55000
- ^{1} French Land Register data, which excludes lakes, ponds, glaciers > 1 km^{2} (0.386 sq mi or 247 acres) and river estuaries.

Naives-Rosières (French pronunciation: [nɛv ʁozjɛʁ]) is a commune in the Meuse department in Grand Est in north-eastern France.

== See also ==
- Communes of the Meuse department
