= Seigneulles =

- Commune
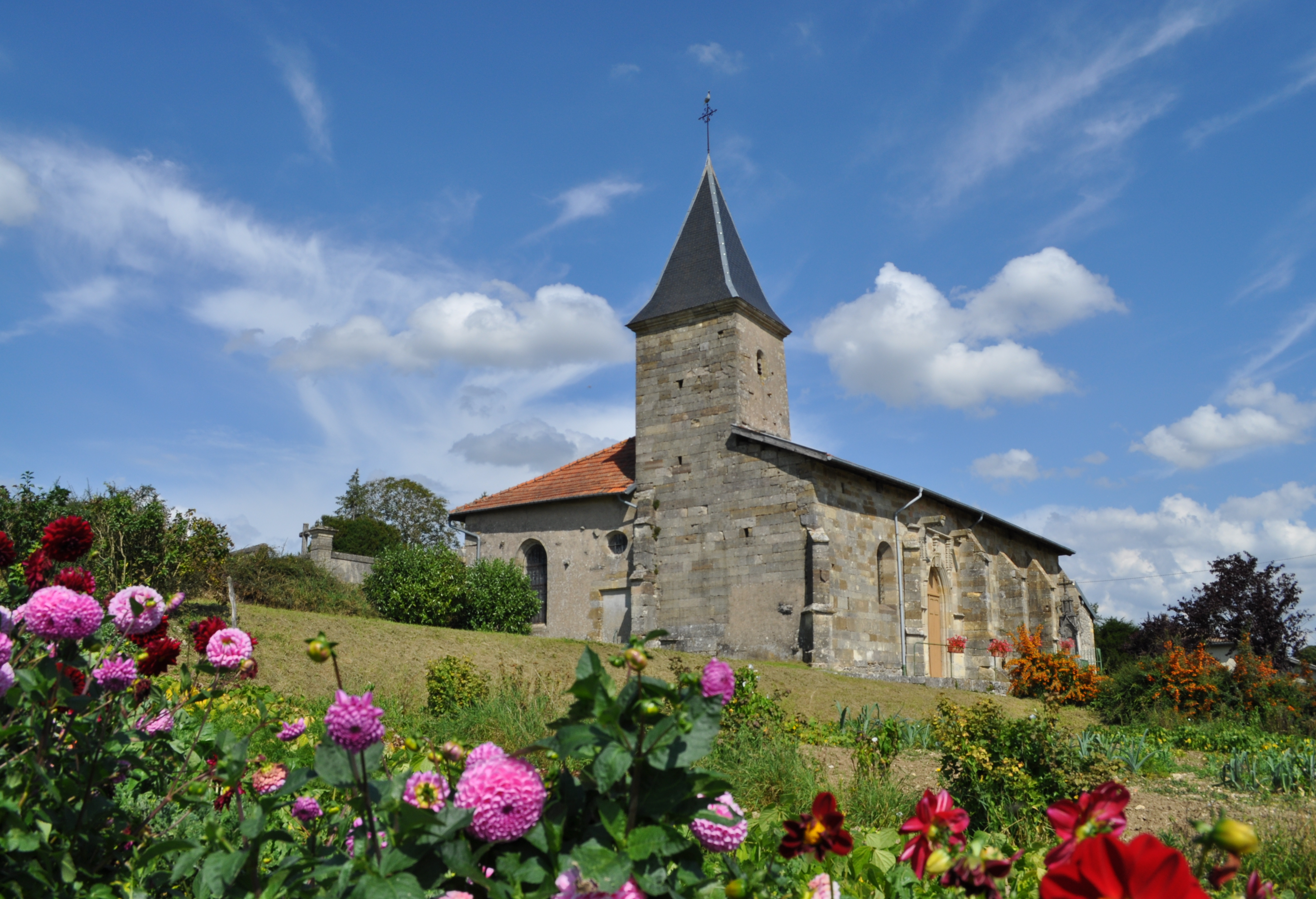
- The church in Seigneulles

- Coat of arms
- Location of Seigneulles
- Location within France Location within Grand Est
- Coordinates: 48°51′05″N 5°14′16″E
- Country: France
- Region: Grand Est
- Department: Meuse
- Arrondissement: Bar-le-Duc
- Canton: Bar-le-Duc-1
- Intercommunality: CC de l'Aire à l'Argonne

Government
  - Mayor (2020–2026): Chantal Jeanson-Lambert
- Area^{1}: 11.7 km^{2} (4.5 sq mi)
- Elevation: 204 m (669 ft)
- Highest elevation: 322 m (1,056 ft)
- Lowest elevation: 237 m (778 ft)
- Population (2023): 153
  - Density: 13.1/km^{2} (33.9/sq mi)
- Time zone: UTC+01:00 (CET)
  - Summer (DST): UTC+02:00 (CEST)
- INSEE/Postal code: 55479 /55000
- ^{1} French Land Register data, which excludes lakes, ponds, glaciers > 1 km^{2} (0.386 sq mi or 247 acres) and river estuaries.

Seigneulles (French pronunciation: [sɛɲœl]) is a commune in the Meuse department in Grand Est in north-eastern France.

== See also ==
- Communes of the Meuse department
