= Savonnières-devant-Bar =

- Commune
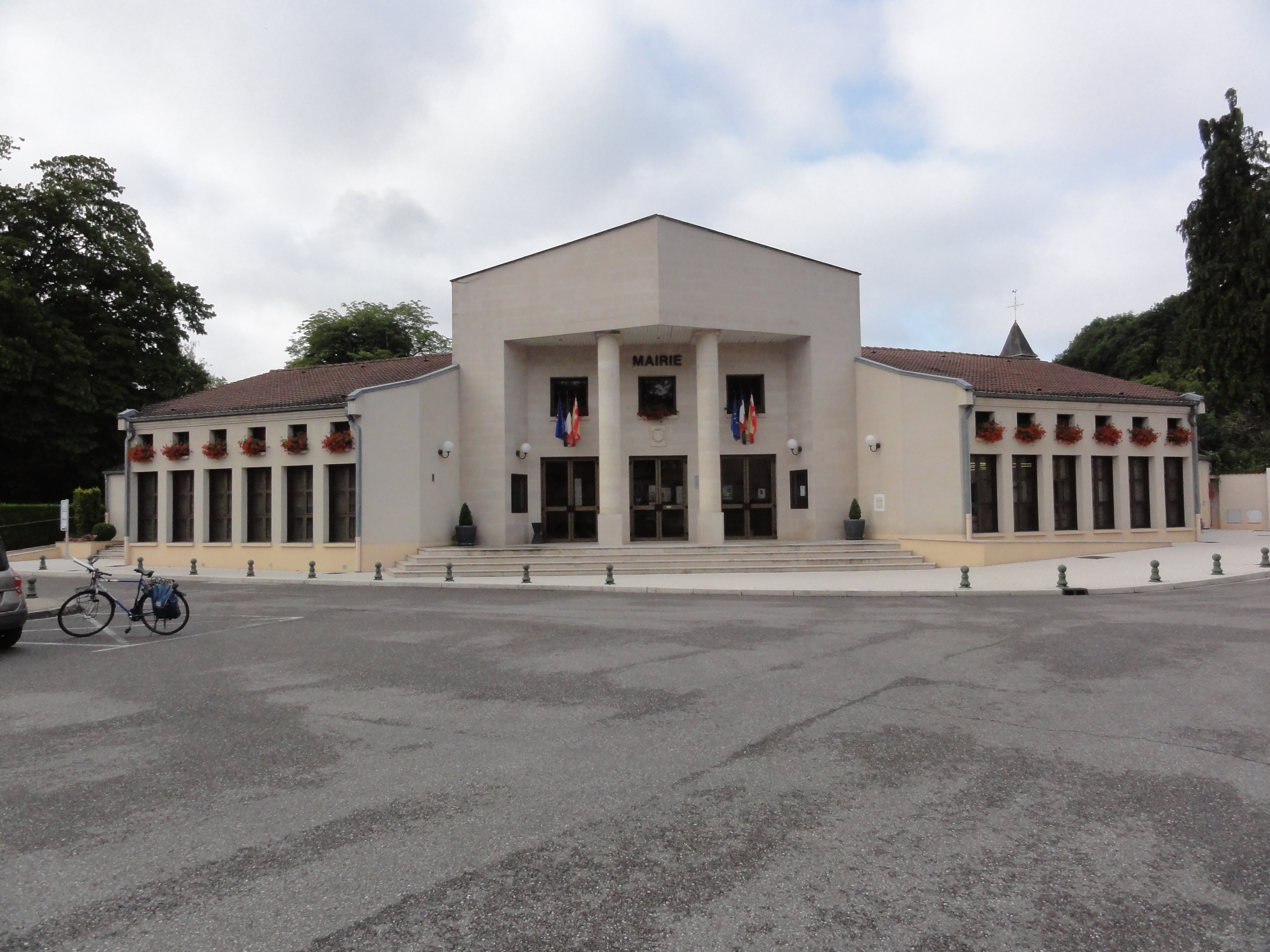
- The town hall in Savonnières-devant-Bar

- Coat of arms
- Location of Savonnières-devant-Bar
- Location within France Location within Grand Est
- Coordinates: 48°45′24″N 5°10′41″E
- Country: France
- Region: Grand Est
- Department: Meuse
- Arrondissement: Bar-le-Duc
- Canton: Bar-le-Duc-1
- Intercommunality: CA Bar-le-Duc - Sud Meuse

Government
  - Mayor (2020–2026): Gérald Michel
- Area^{1}: 5.16 km^{2} (1.99 sq mi)
- Elevation: 190 m (620 ft)
- Highest elevation: 326 m (1,070 ft)
- Lowest elevation: 182 m (597 ft)
- Population (2023): 430
  - Density: 83/km^{2} (220/sq mi)
- Time zone: UTC+01:00 (CET)
  - Summer (DST): UTC+02:00 (CEST)
- INSEE/Postal code: 55476 /55000
- ^{1} French Land Register data, which excludes lakes, ponds, glaciers > 1 km^{2} (0.386 sq mi or 247 acres) and river estuaries.

Savonnières-devant-Bar (French pronunciation: [savɔnjɛʁ dəvɑ̃ baʁ], literally Savonnières before Bar) is a commune in the Meuse department in Grand Est in north-eastern France.

== See also ==
- Communes of the Meuse department
