= Resson =

- Commune
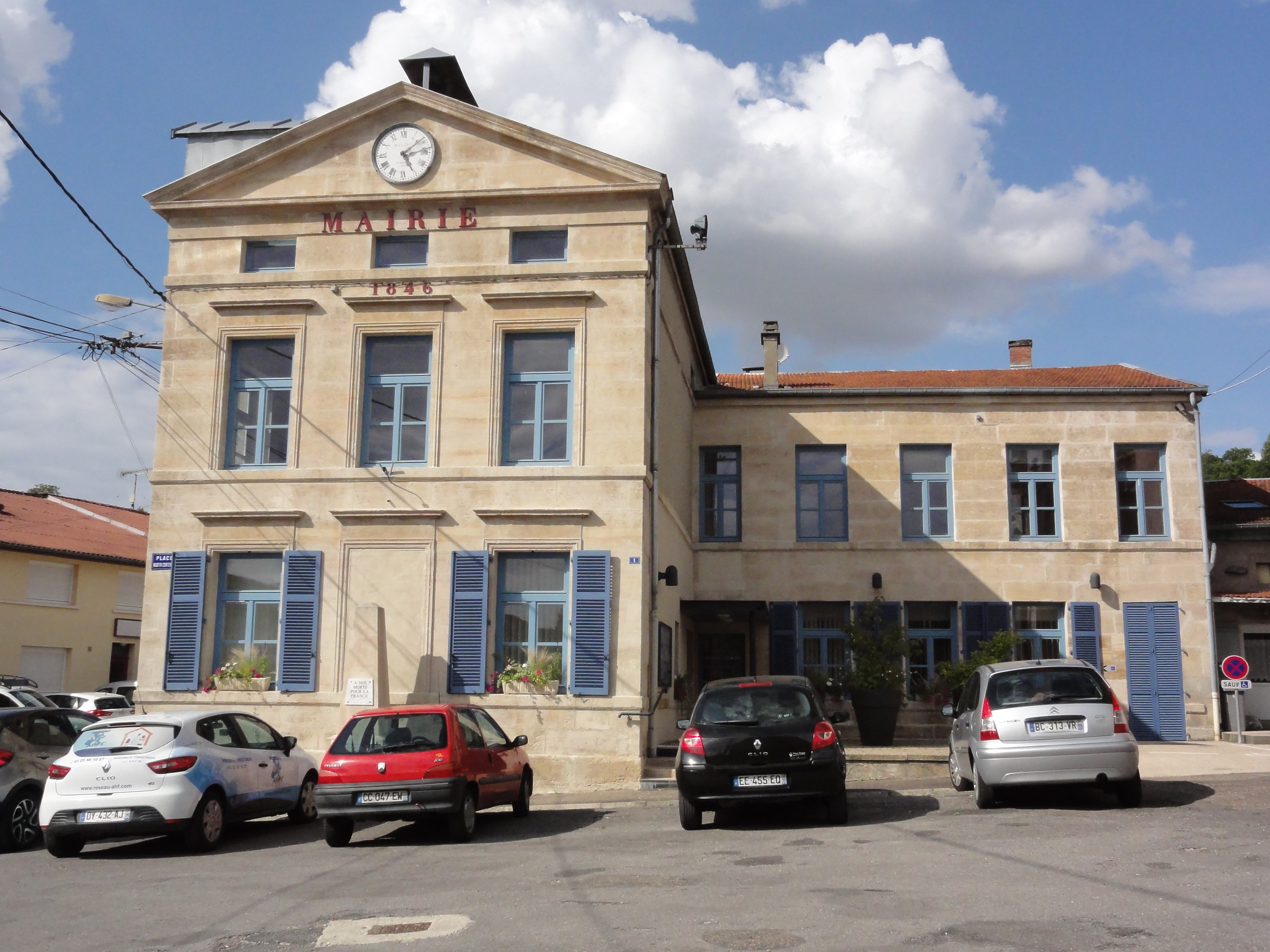
- The town hall in Resson

- Coat of arms
- Location of Resson
- Location within France Location within Grand Est
- Coordinates: 48°46′12″N 5°13′46″E
- Country: France
- Region: Grand Est
- Department: Meuse
- Arrondissement: Bar-le-Duc
- Canton: Bar-le-Duc-1
- Intercommunality: CA Bar-le-Duc - Sud Meuse

Government
  - Mayor (2020–2026): Hervé Vuillaume
- Area^{1}: 8.4 km^{2} (3.2 sq mi)
- Elevation: 240 m (790 ft)
- Highest elevation: 341 m (1,119 ft)
- Lowest elevation: 209 m (686 ft)
- Population (2023): 361
  - Density: 43/km^{2} (110/sq mi)
- Time zone: UTC+01:00 (CET)
  - Summer (DST): UTC+02:00 (CEST)
- INSEE/Postal code: 55426 /55000
- ^{1} French Land Register data, which excludes lakes, ponds, glaciers > 1 km^{2} (0.386 sq mi or 247 acres) and river estuaries.

Resson (French pronunciation: [ʁɛsɔ̃]) is a commune in the Meuse department in Grand Est in north-eastern France.

== See also ==
- Communes of the Meuse department
