= Géry =

- Commune
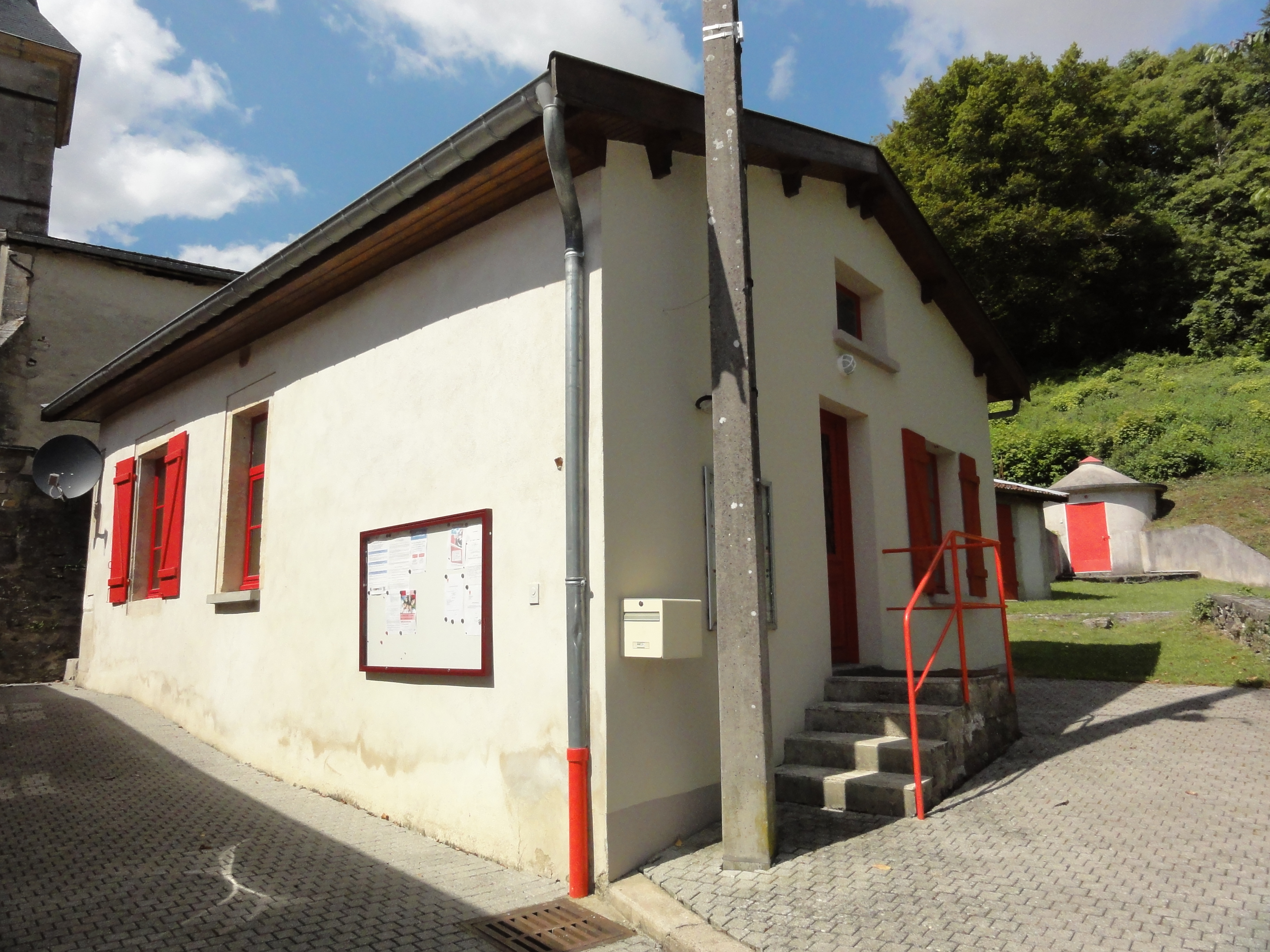
- The town hall in Géry

- Coat of arms
- Location of Géry
- Location within France Location within Grand Est
- Coordinates: 48°46′54″N 5°17′43″E
- Country: France
- Region: Grand Est
- Department: Meuse
- Arrondissement: Bar-le-Duc
- Canton: Bar-le-Duc-1

Government
  - Mayor (2020–2026): Raphaël Humbert
- Area^{1}: 4.8 km^{2} (1.9 sq mi)
- Elevation: 300 m (980 ft)
- Highest elevation: 376 m (1,234 ft)
- Lowest elevation: 260 m (850 ft)
- Population (2023): 50
  - Density: 10/km^{2} (27/sq mi)
- Time zone: UTC+01:00 (CET)
  - Summer (DST): UTC+02:00 (CEST)
- INSEE/Postal code: 55207 /55000
- ^{1} French Land Register data, which excludes lakes, ponds, glaciers > 1 km^{2} (0.386 sq mi or 247 acres) and river estuaries.

Géry (French pronunciation: [ʒeʁi]) is a commune in the Meuse department in Grand Est in north-eastern France.

== See also ==
- Communes of the Meuse department
