= Combles-en-Barrois =

- Commune
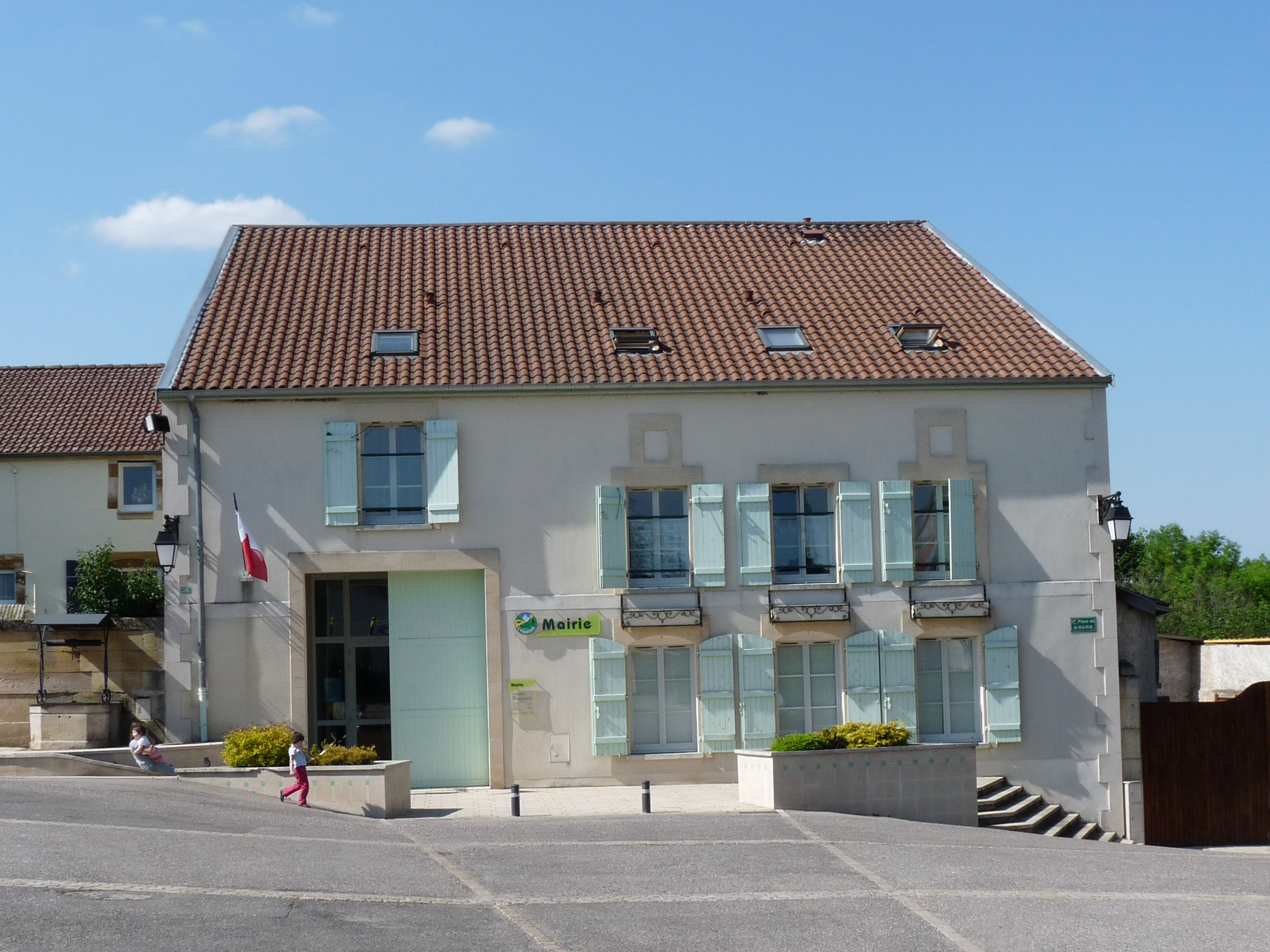
- The town hall in Combles-en-Barrois

- Coat of arms
- Location of Combles-en-Barrois
- Location within France Location within Grand Est
- Coordinates: 48°45′06″N 5°07′02″E
- Country: France
- Region: Grand Est
- Department: Meuse
- Arrondissement: Bar-le-Duc
- Canton: Bar-le-Duc-1
- Intercommunality: CA Bar-le-Duc - Sud Meuse

Government
  - Mayor (2020–2026): Francis Jouron
- Area^{1}: 10.26 km^{2} (3.96 sq mi)
- Elevation: 248 m (814 ft)
- Highest elevation: 279 m (915 ft)
- Lowest elevation: 199 m (653 ft)
- Population (2023): 770
  - Density: 75/km^{2} (190/sq mi)
- Time zone: UTC+01:00 (CET)
  - Summer (DST): UTC+02:00 (CEST)
- INSEE/Postal code: 55120 /55000
- ^{1} French Land Register data, which excludes lakes, ponds, glaciers > 1 km^{2} (0.386 sq mi or 247 acres) and river estuaries.

Combles-en-Barrois (French pronunciation: [kɔ̃bl ɑ̃ baʁwa], lit. 'Combles in Barrois') is a commune in the Meuse department in Grand Est in north-eastern France.

== See also ==
- Communes of the Meuse department
