= Buthiers, Seine-et-Marne =

Buthiers
- Commune
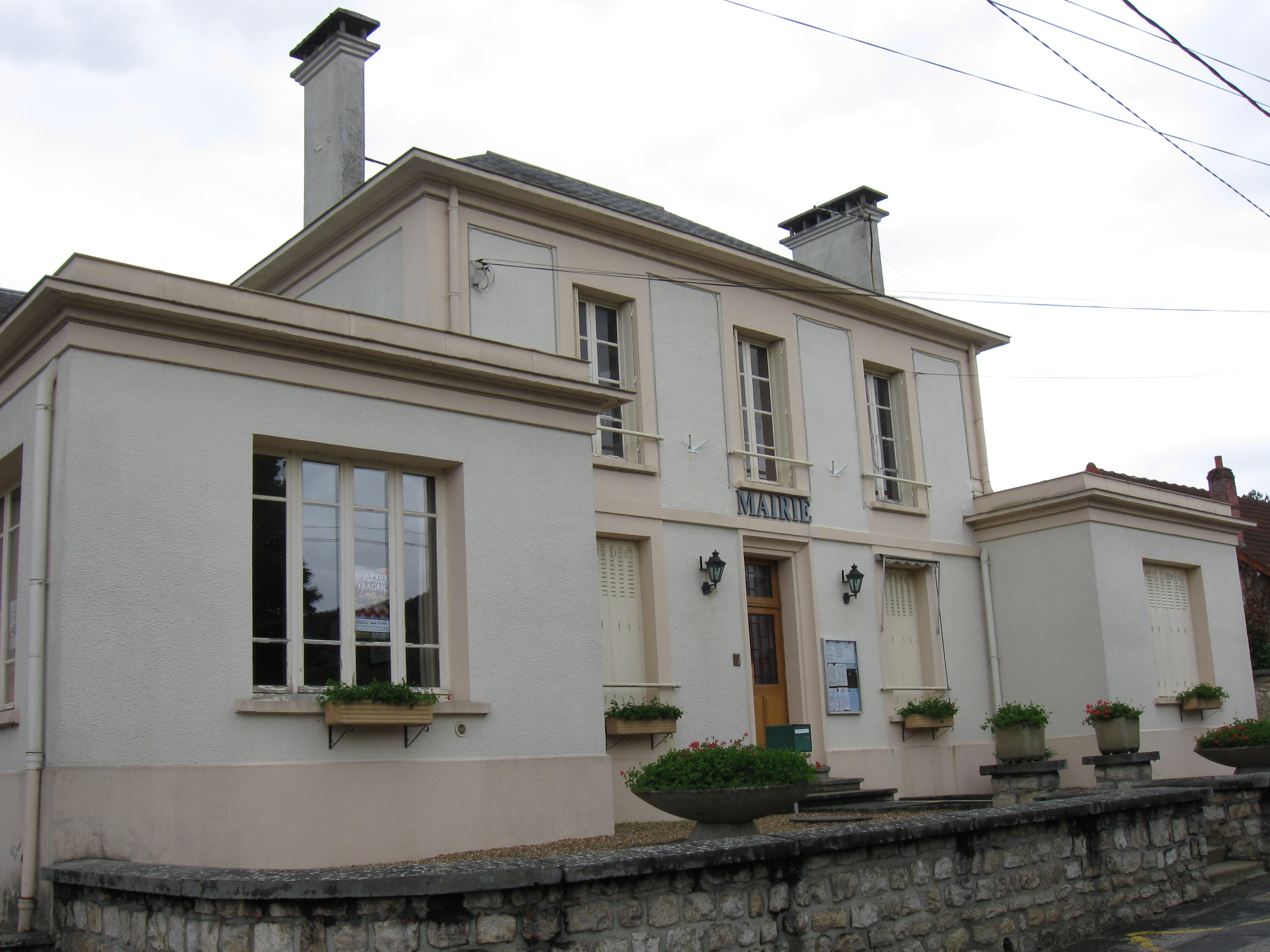
- The town hall in Buthiers
- Location of Buthiers
- Location within France Location within Île-de-France (region)
- Coordinates: 48°17′17″N 2°25′53″E
- Country: France
- Region: Île-de-France
- Department: Seine-et-Marne
- Arrondissement: Fontainebleau
- Canton: Fontainebleau

Government
  - Mayor (2020–2026): Christophe Chamoreau
- Area^{1}: 19.67 km^{2} (7.59 sq mi)
- Highest elevation: 122 m (400 ft)
- Lowest elevation: 70 m (230 ft)
- Population (2023): 792
  - Density: 40.3/km^{2} (104/sq mi)
- Time zone: UTC+01:00 (CET)
  - Summer (DST): UTC+02:00 (CEST)
- INSEE/Postal code: 77060 /77760
- ^{1} French Land Register data, which excludes lakes, ponds, glaciers > 1 km^{2} (0.386 sq mi or 247 acres) and river estuaries.

Buthiers (French pronunciation: [bytje]) is a commune in the Seine-et-Marne department in the Île-de-France region in north-central France.

== Demographics ==
The inhabitants are called Butherais.

== See also ==
- Communes of the Seine-et-Marne department
