= Érize-Saint-Dizier =

- Commune
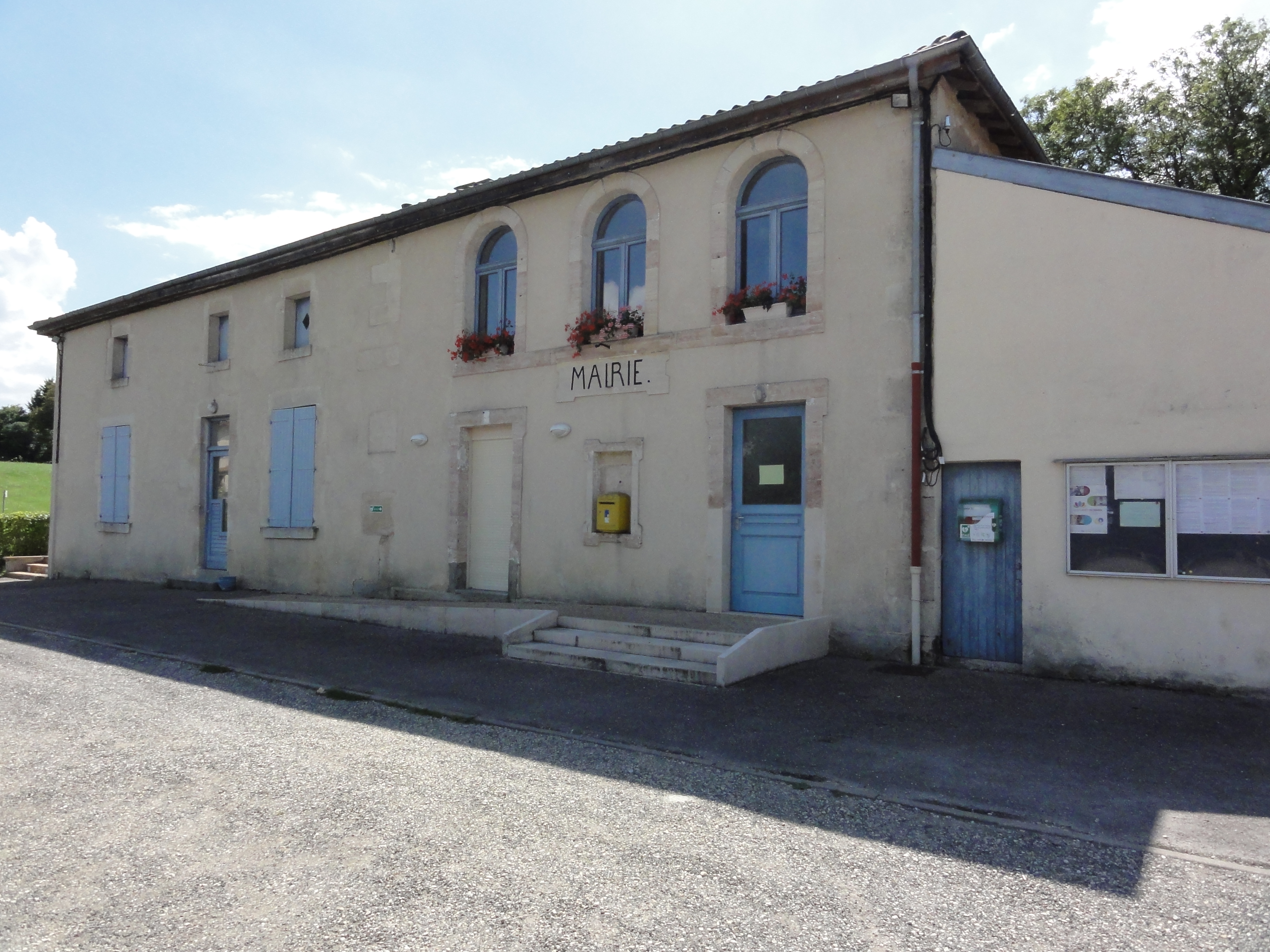
- The town hall in Érize-Saint-Dizier

- Coat of arms
- Location of Érize-Saint-Dizier
- Location within France Location within Grand Est
- Coordinates: 48°48′48″N 5°17′06″E
- Country: France
- Region: Grand Est
- Department: Meuse
- Arrondissement: Bar-le-Duc
- Canton: Bar-le-Duc-1
- Intercommunality: CC de l'Aire à l'Argonne

Government
  - Mayor (2022–2026): Patrice Charton
- Area^{1}: 12.49 km^{2} (4.82 sq mi)
- Highest elevation: 371 m (1,217 ft)
- Lowest elevation: 290 m (950 ft)
- Population (2023): 192
  - Density: 15.4/km^{2} (39.8/sq mi)
- Time zone: UTC+01:00 (CET)
  - Summer (DST): UTC+02:00 (CEST)
- INSEE/Postal code: 55178 /55000
- ^{1} French Land Register data, which excludes lakes, ponds, glaciers > 1 km^{2} (0.386 sq mi or 247 acres) and river estuaries.

Érize-Saint-Dizier (French pronunciation: [eʁiz sɛ̃ dizje]) is a commune in the Meuse department in Grand Est in north-eastern France.

== See also ==
- Communes of the Meuse department
