= Canton of Bar-le-Duc-1 =

Coordinates: 48.77°N 5.16°E

The canton of Bar-le-Duc-1 is an administrative division of the Meuse department, northeastern France. It was created at the French canton reorganisation which came into effect in March 2015. Its seat is in Bar-le-Duc.

It consists of the following communes:

1. Bar-le-Duc (partly)
2. Combles-en-Barrois
3. Érize-la-Brûlée
4. Érize-Saint-Dizier
5. Géry
6. Longeville-en-Barrois
7. Naives-Rosières
8. Resson
9. Raival
10. Rumont
11. Savonnières-devant-Bar
12. Seigneulles
13. Trémont-sur-Saulx
