= Velaines =

- Commune
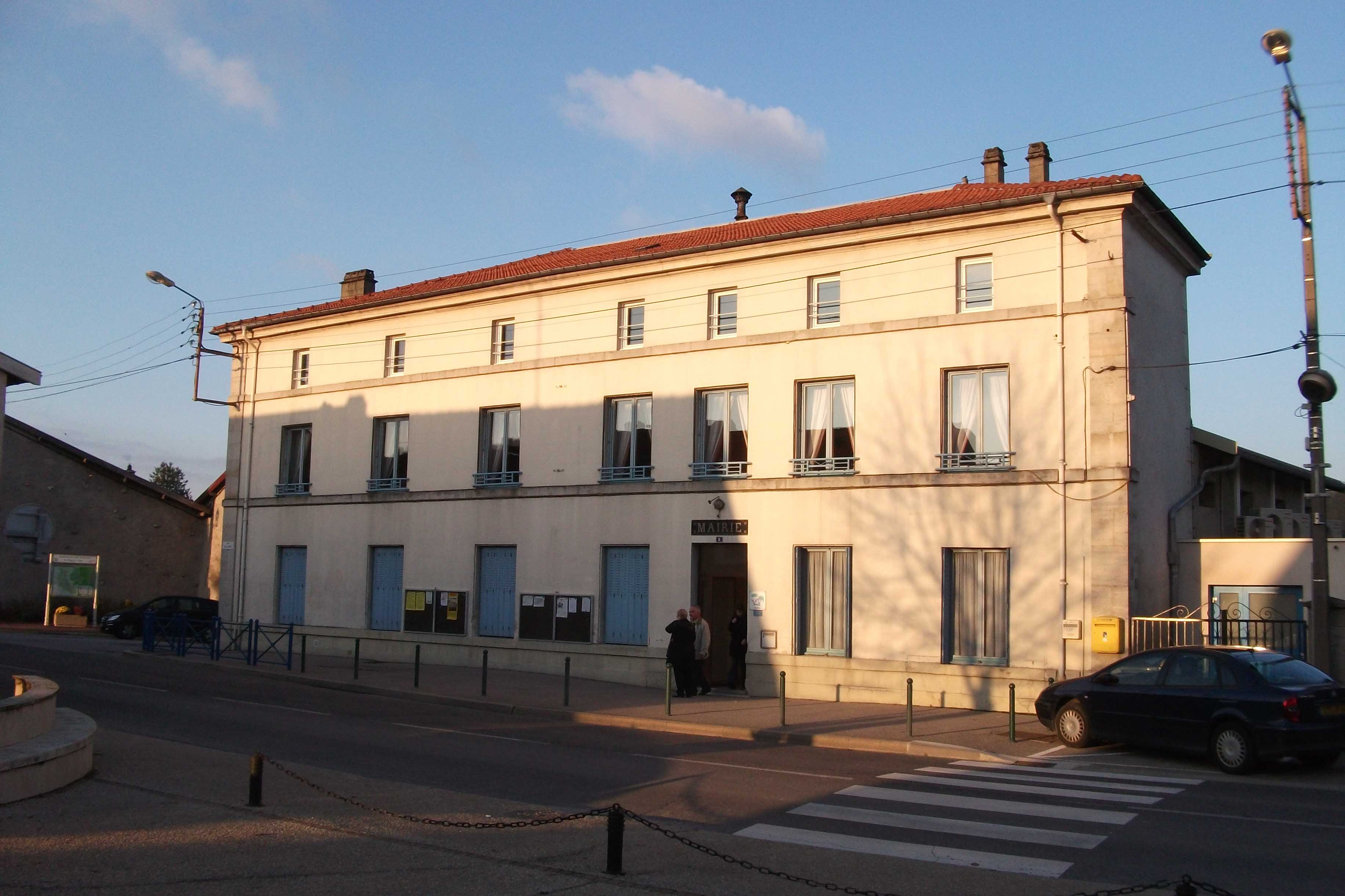
- The town hall in Velaines

- Coat of arms
- Location of Velaines
- Location within France Location within Grand Est
- Coordinates: 48°42′14″N 5°18′09″E
- Country: France
- Region: Grand Est
- Department: Meuse
- Arrondissement: Bar-le-Duc
- Canton: Ancerville
- Intercommunality: CA Bar-le-Duc - Sud Meuse

Government
  - Mayor (2023–2026): Christian Chaupain
- Area^{1}: 10.71 km^{2} (4.14 sq mi)
- Elevation: 218 m (715 ft)
- Highest elevation: 364 m (1,194 ft)
- Lowest elevation: 213 m (699 ft)
- Population (2023): 874
  - Density: 81.6/km^{2} (211/sq mi)
- Time zone: UTC+01:00 (CET)
  - Summer (DST): UTC+02:00 (CEST)
- INSEE/Postal code: 55543 /55500
- ^{1} French Land Register data, which excludes lakes, ponds, glaciers > 1 km^{2} (0.386 sq mi or 247 acres) and river estuaries.

Velaines (French pronunciation: [vəlɛn]) is a commune in the Meuse department in Grand Est in north-eastern France.

== See also ==
- Communes of the Meuse department
