= Raival =

- Commune
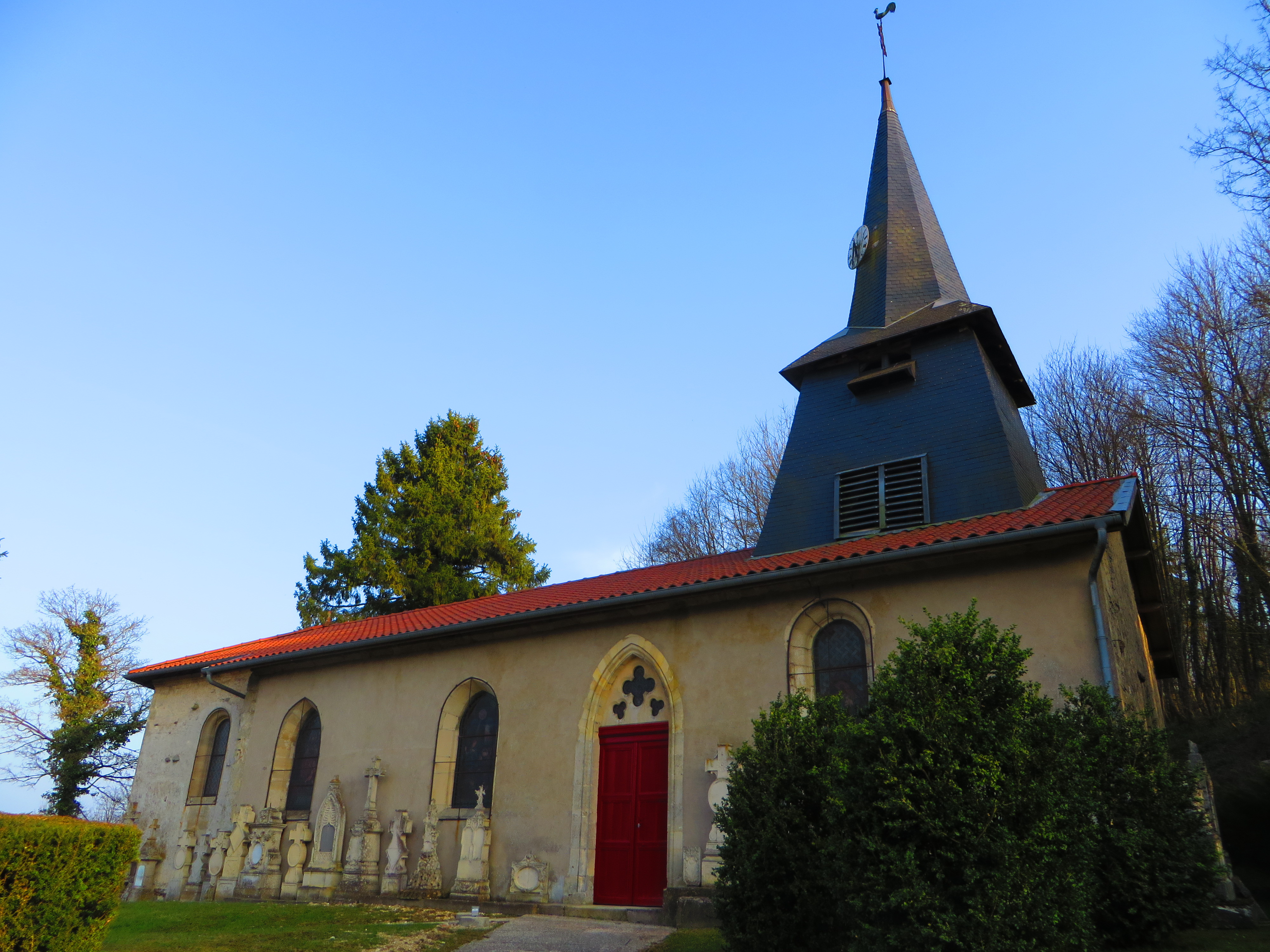
- The church in Raival

- Coat of arms
- Location of Raival
- Location within France Location within Grand Est
- Coordinates: 48°52′17″N 5°16′07″E
- Country: France
- Region: Grand Est
- Department: Meuse
- Arrondissement: Bar-le-Duc
- Canton: Bar-le-Duc-1
- Intercommunality: CC de l'Aire à l'Argonne

Government
  - Mayor (2020–2026): Lidwine Linard
- Area^{1}: 19.22 km^{2} (7.42 sq mi)
- Elevation: 318 m (1,043 ft)
- Highest elevation: 337 m (1,106 ft)
- Lowest elevation: 241 m (791 ft)
- Population (2023): 236
  - Density: 12.3/km^{2} (31.8/sq mi)
- Time zone: UTC+01:00 (CET)
  - Summer (DST): UTC+02:00 (CEST)
- INSEE/Postal code: 55442 /55260
- ^{1} French Land Register data, which excludes lakes, ponds, glaciers > 1 km^{2} (0.386 sq mi or 247 acres) and river estuaries.

Raival (French pronunciation: [ʁɛval]) is a commune in the Meuse department in Grand Est in north-eastern France. It was created in 1973 by the merger of two former communes: Rosnes and Érize-la-Grande. Vignotte, a mild creamy cheese obtainable in the UK, is produced there.

== See also ==
- Communes of the Meuse department
