= Rumont, Meuse =

Rumont
- Commune
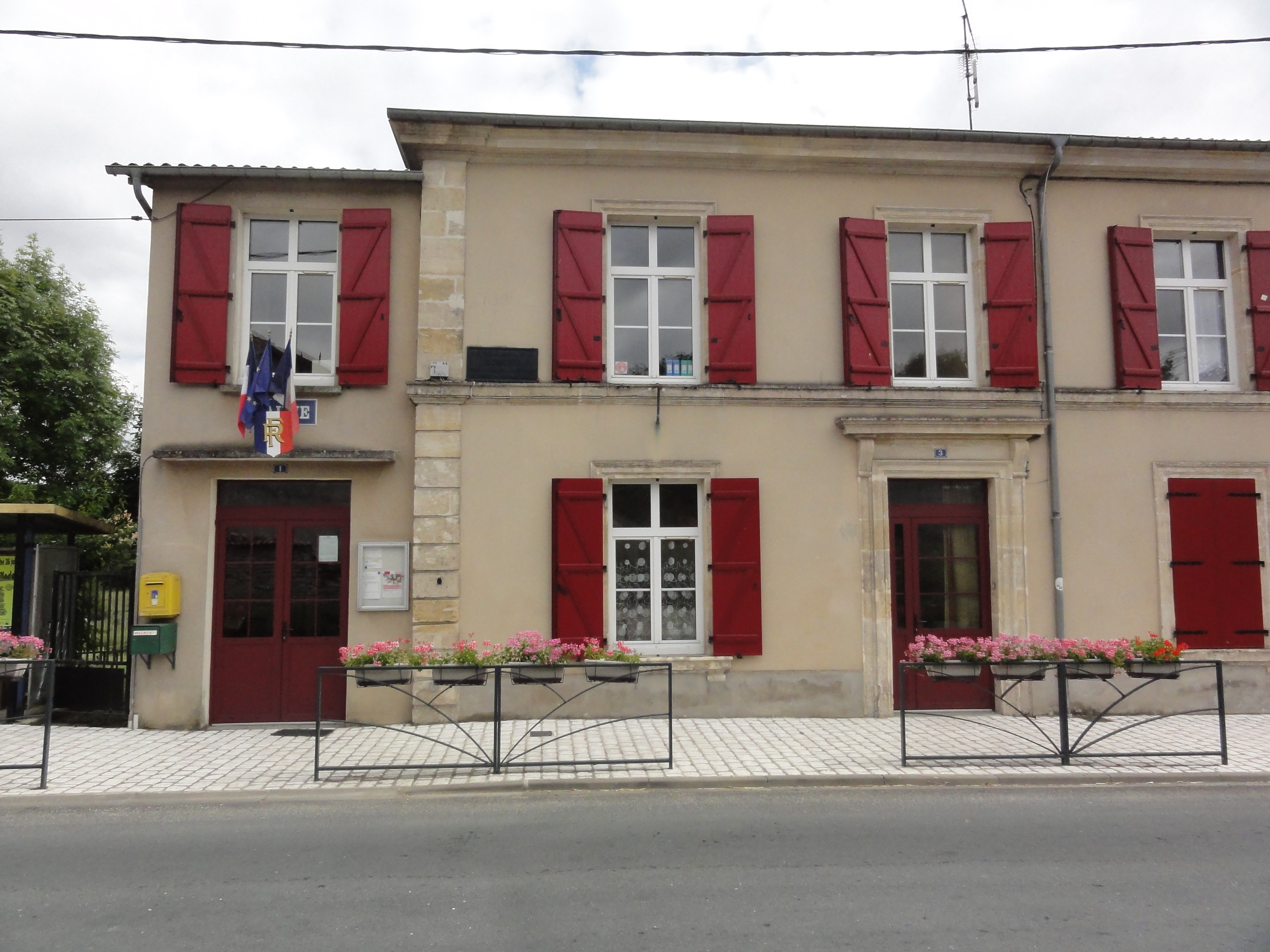
- The town hall in Rumont

- Coat of arms
- Location of Rumont
- Location within France Location within Grand Est
- Coordinates: 48°49′58″N 5°16′39″E
- Country: France
- Region: Grand Est
- Department: Meuse
- Arrondissement: Bar-le-Duc
- Canton: Bar-le-Duc-1
- Intercommunality: CA Bar-le-Duc - Sud Meuse

Government
  - Mayor (2020–2026): Alexandre Aubry
- Area^{1}: 6.31 km^{2} (2.44 sq mi)
- Elevation: 305 m (1,001 ft)
- Highest elevation: 366 m (1,201 ft)
- Lowest elevation: 294 m (965 ft)
- Population (2023): 83
  - Density: 13/km^{2} (34/sq mi)
- Time zone: UTC+01:00 (CET)
  - Summer (DST): UTC+02:00 (CEST)
- INSEE/Postal code: 55446 /55000
- ^{1} French Land Register data, which excludes lakes, ponds, glaciers > 1 km^{2} (0.386 sq mi or 247 acres) and river estuaries.

Rumont (French pronunciation: [ʁymɔ̃]) is a commune in the Meuse department in Grand Est in north-eastern France.

== See also ==
- Communes of the Meuse department
