= Léning =

- Commune
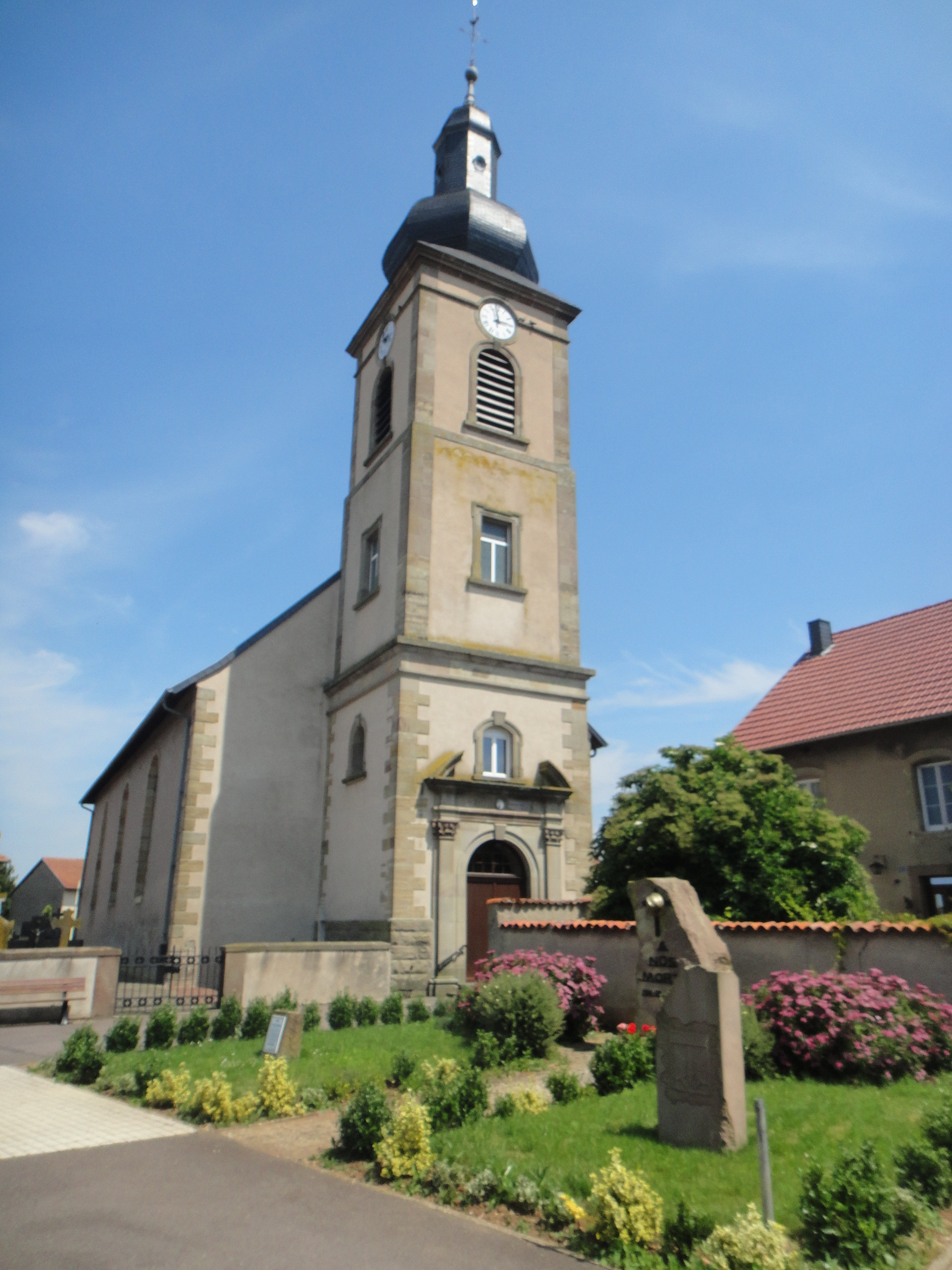
- The church in Léning

- Coat of arms
- Location of Léning
- Location within France Location within Grand Est
- Coordinates: 48°57′28″N 6°48′28″E
- Country: France
- Region: Grand Est
- Department: Moselle
- Arrondissement: Sarrebourg-Château-Salins
- Canton: Le Saulnois
- Intercommunality: CC du Saulnois

Government
  - Mayor (2020–2026): Antoine Ernst
- Area^{1}: 6.49 km^{2} (2.51 sq mi)
- Elevation: 225 m (738 ft)
- Highest elevation: 300 m (980 ft)
- Lowest elevation: 216 m (709 ft)
- Population (2023): 321
  - Density: 49.5/km^{2} (128/sq mi)
- Time zone: UTC+01:00 (CET)
  - Summer (DST): UTC+02:00 (CEST)
- INSEE/Postal code: 57394 /57670
- ^{1} French Land Register data, which excludes lakes, ponds, glaciers > 1 km^{2} (0.386 sq mi or 247 acres) and river estuaries.

Léning (French pronunciation: [lenɛ̃]; Lorraine Franconian: Läning; German: Leiningen) is a commune in the Moselle department in Grand Est in north-eastern France.

== See also ==
- Communes of the Moselle department
