= Honskirch =

- Commune
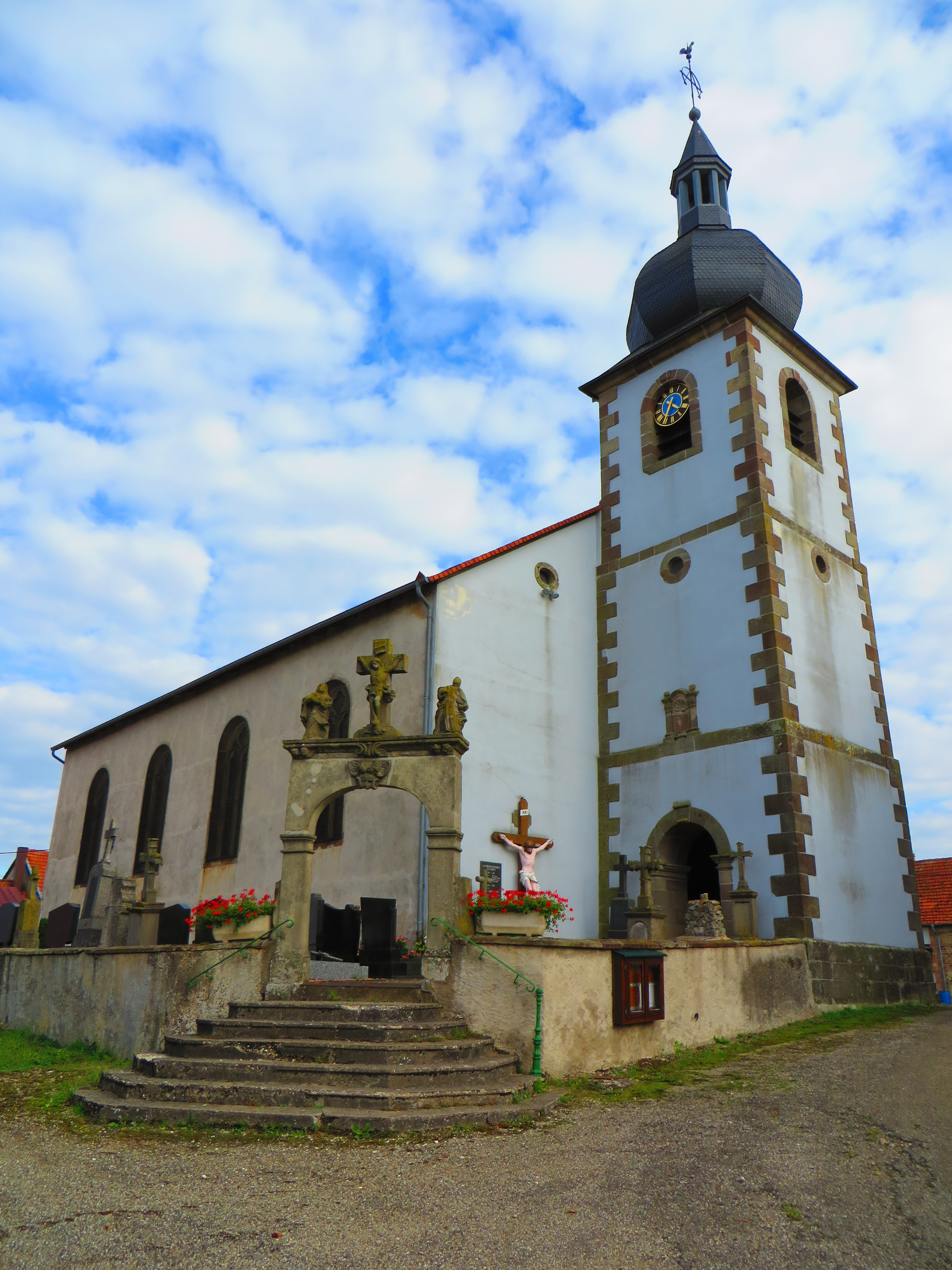
- The church in Honskirch

- Coat of arms
- Location of Honskirch
- Location within France Location within Grand Est
- Coordinates: 48°56′31″N 6°57′26″E
- Country: France
- Region: Grand Est
- Department: Moselle
- Arrondissement: Sarrebourg-Château-Salins
- Canton: Le Saulnois
- Intercommunality: CC du Saulnois

Government
  - Mayor (2020–2026): Carol Monsieux
- Area^{1}: 6.55 km^{2} (2.53 sq mi)
- Elevation: 243 m (797 ft)
- Highest elevation: 252 m (827 ft)
- Lowest elevation: 213 m (699 ft)
- Population (2023): 213
  - Density: 32.5/km^{2} (84.2/sq mi)
- Time zone: UTC+01:00 (CET)
  - Summer (DST): UTC+02:00 (CEST)
- INSEE/Postal code: 57335 /57670
- ^{1} French Land Register data, which excludes lakes, ponds, glaciers > 1 km^{2} (0.386 sq mi or 247 acres) and river estuaries.

Honskirch (German: Hunkirch) is a commune in the Moselle department in Grand Est in north-eastern France.

== See also ==
- Communes of the Moselle department
