= Puttigny =

- Commune
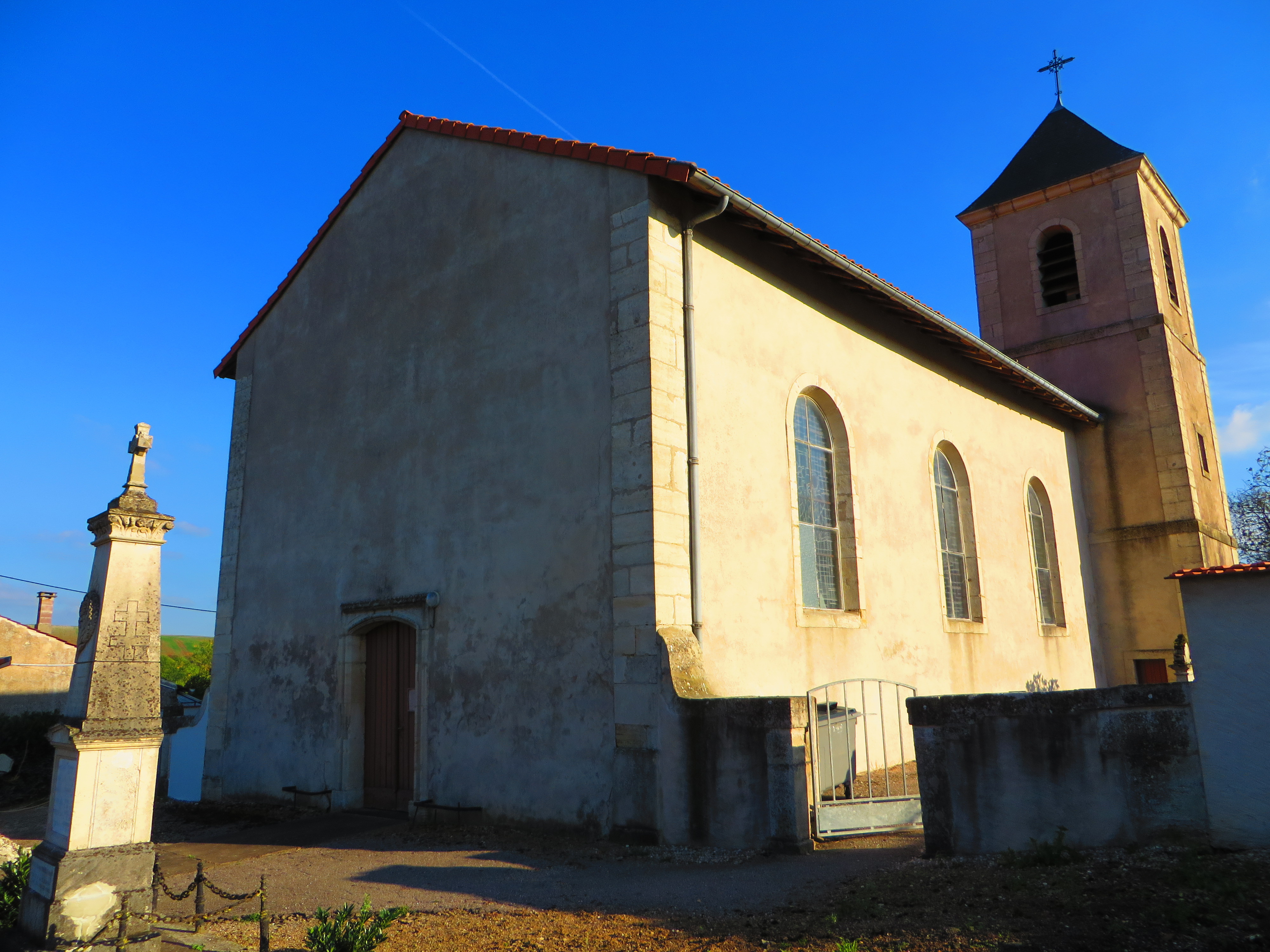
- The church in Puttigny

- Coat of arms
- Location of Puttigny
- Location within France Location within Grand Est
- Coordinates: 48°51′12″N 6°33′08″E
- Country: France
- Region: Grand Est
- Department: Moselle
- Arrondissement: Sarrebourg-Château-Salins
- Canton: Le Saulnois
- Intercommunality: CC du Saulnois

Government
  - Mayor (2020–2026): Robert Perrin
- Area^{1}: 7.47 km^{2} (2.88 sq mi)
- Elevation: 225 m (738 ft)
- Highest elevation: 267 m (876 ft)
- Lowest elevation: 205 m (673 ft)
- Population (2023): 75
  - Density: 10/km^{2} (26/sq mi)
- Time zone: UTC+01:00 (CET)
  - Summer (DST): UTC+02:00 (CEST)
- INSEE/Postal code: 57558 /57170
- ^{1} French Land Register data, which excludes lakes, ponds, glaciers > 1 km^{2} (0.386 sq mi or 247 acres) and river estuaries.

Puttigny (French pronunciation: [pytiɲi]; German: Püttingen) is a commune in the Moselle department in Grand Est in north-eastern France.

== See also ==
- Communes of the Moselle department
