= Bermering =

- Commune
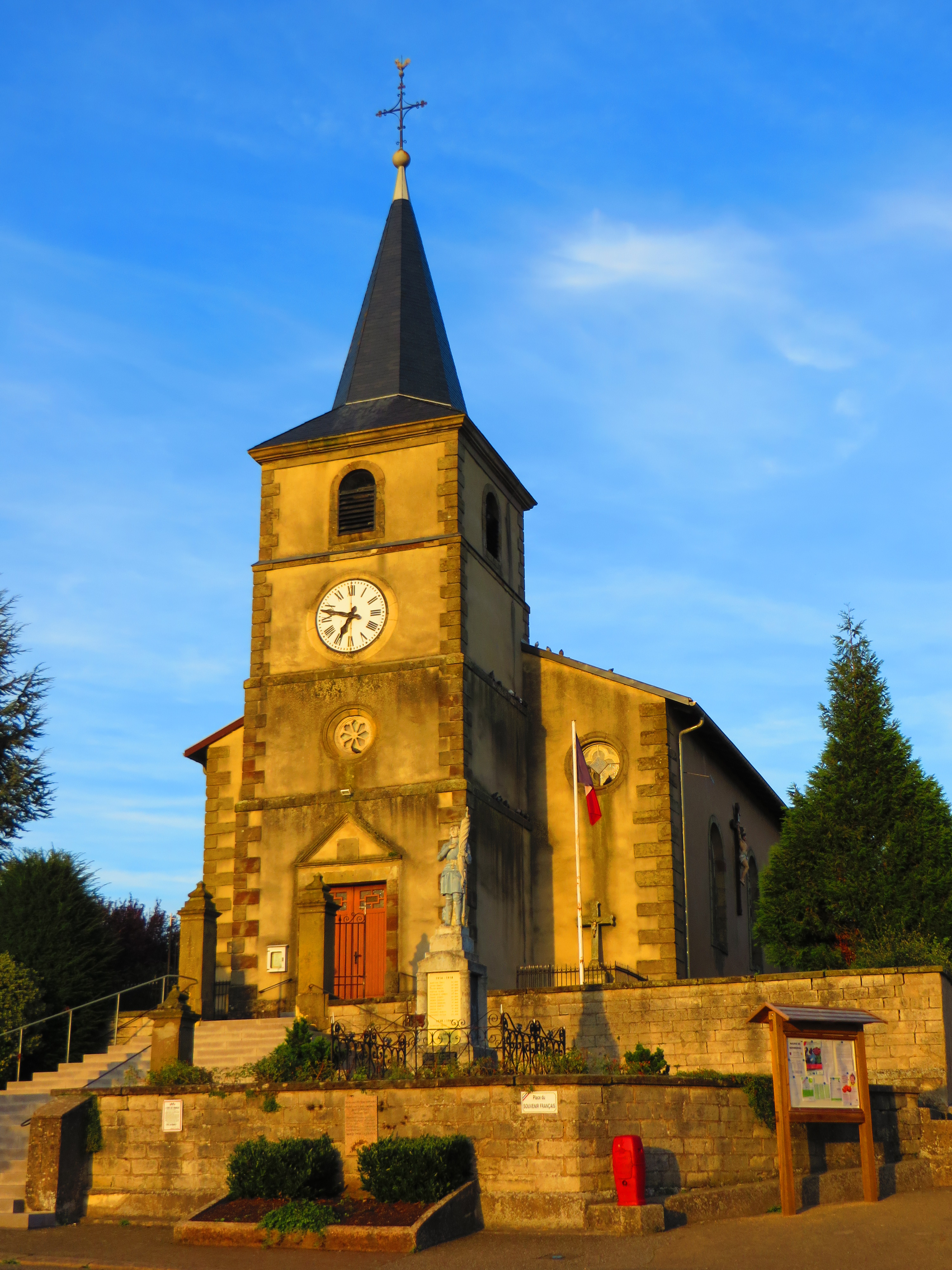
- The church in Bermering

- Coat of arms
- Location of Bermering
- Location within France Location within Grand Est
- Coordinates: 48°55′56″N 6°42′35″E
- Country: France
- Region: Grand Est
- Department: Moselle
- Arrondissement: Sarrebourg-Château-Salins
- Canton: Le Saulnois
- Intercommunality: CC Saulnois

Government
  - Mayor (2024–2026): Philippe Antoine
- Area^{1}: 5.73 km^{2} (2.21 sq mi)
- Elevation: 260 m (850 ft)
- Highest elevation: 282 m (925 ft)
- Lowest elevation: 229 m (751 ft)
- Population (2023): 199
  - Density: 34.7/km^{2} (89.9/sq mi)
- Time zone: UTC+01:00 (CET)
  - Summer (DST): UTC+02:00 (CEST)
- INSEE/Postal code: 57065 /57340
- ^{1} French Land Register data, which excludes lakes, ponds, glaciers > 1 km^{2} (0.386 sq mi or 247 acres) and river estuaries.

Bermering (French pronunciation: [bɛʁməʁɛ̃]; German: Bermeringen) is a commune in the Moselle department in Grand Est in northeastern France.

== Population ==
Historical population
Year	Pop.	±% p.a.
1968	305	—
1975	288	−0.82%
1982	285	−0.15%
1990	233	−2.49%
1999	223	−0.49%
2007	238	+0.82%
2012	244	+0.50%
2017	225	−1.61%
2023	199	−2.03%
Source: INSEE

== See also ==
- Communes of the Moselle department
