= Jallaucourt =

- Commune
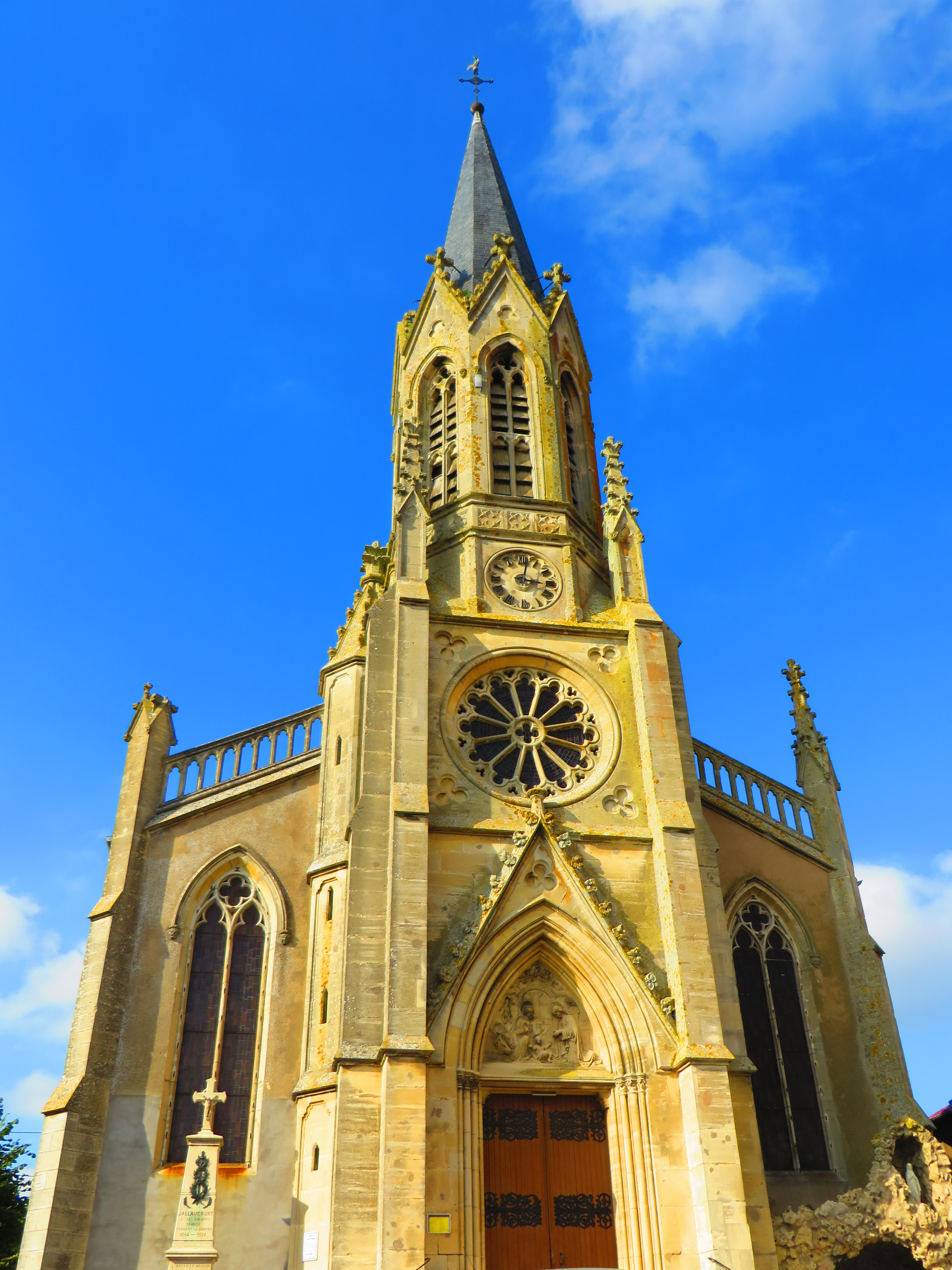
- The church in Jallaucourt

- Coat of arms
- Location of Jallaucourt
- Location within France Location within Grand Est
- Coordinates: 48°50′23″N 6°23′14″E
- Country: France
- Region: Grand Est
- Department: Moselle
- Arrondissement: Sarrebourg-Château-Salins
- Canton: Le Saulnois
- Intercommunality: CC du Saulnois

Government
  - Mayor (2020–2026): François Florentin
- Area^{1}: 8.41 km^{2} (3.25 sq mi)
- Elevation: 260 m (850 ft)
- Highest elevation: 295 m (968 ft)
- Lowest elevation: 217 m (712 ft)
- Population (2023): 137
  - Density: 16.3/km^{2} (42.2/sq mi)
- Time zone: UTC+01:00 (CET)
  - Summer (DST): UTC+02:00 (CEST)
- INSEE/Postal code: 57349 /57590
- ^{1} French Land Register data, which excludes lakes, ponds, glaciers > 1 km^{2} (0.386 sq mi or 247 acres) and river estuaries.

Jallaucourt (French pronunciation: [ʒalokuʁ]; German: Gellshofen) is a commune in the Moselle department in Grand Est in north-eastern France.

== See also ==
- Communes of the Moselle department
