= Dalhain =

- Commune
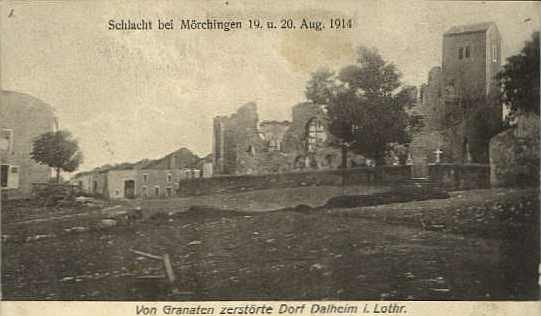
- The village in 1914

- Coat of arms
- Location of Dalhain
- Location within France Location within Grand Est
- Coordinates: 48°53′20″N 6°33′41″E
- Country: France
- Region: Grand Est
- Department: Moselle
- Arrondissement: Sarrebourg-Château-Salins
- Canton: Le Saulnois
- Intercommunality: CC du Saulnois

Government
  - Mayor (2020–2026): Didier Conte
- Area^{1}: 4.83 km^{2} (1.86 sq mi)
- Elevation: 240 m (790 ft)
- Highest elevation: 298 m (978 ft)
- Lowest elevation: 218 m (715 ft)
- Population (2023): 97
  - Density: 20/km^{2} (52/sq mi)
- Time zone: UTC+01:00 (CET)
  - Summer (DST): UTC+02:00 (CEST)
- INSEE/Postal code: 57166 /57340
- ^{1} French Land Register data, which excludes lakes, ponds, glaciers > 1 km^{2} (0.386 sq mi or 247 acres) and river estuaries.

Dalhain (French pronunciation: [dalɛ̃]; German: Dalheim) is a commune in the Moselle department in Grand Est in north-eastern France.

The name Dalhain is of Germanic origins from the roots 'dal' meaning 'valley' and 'heim' meaning 'village'. The name is also recorded as Dalem, Dala, Dalehen and Dalcheim.

== See also ==
- Communes of the Moselle department
