= Lezey =

- Commune
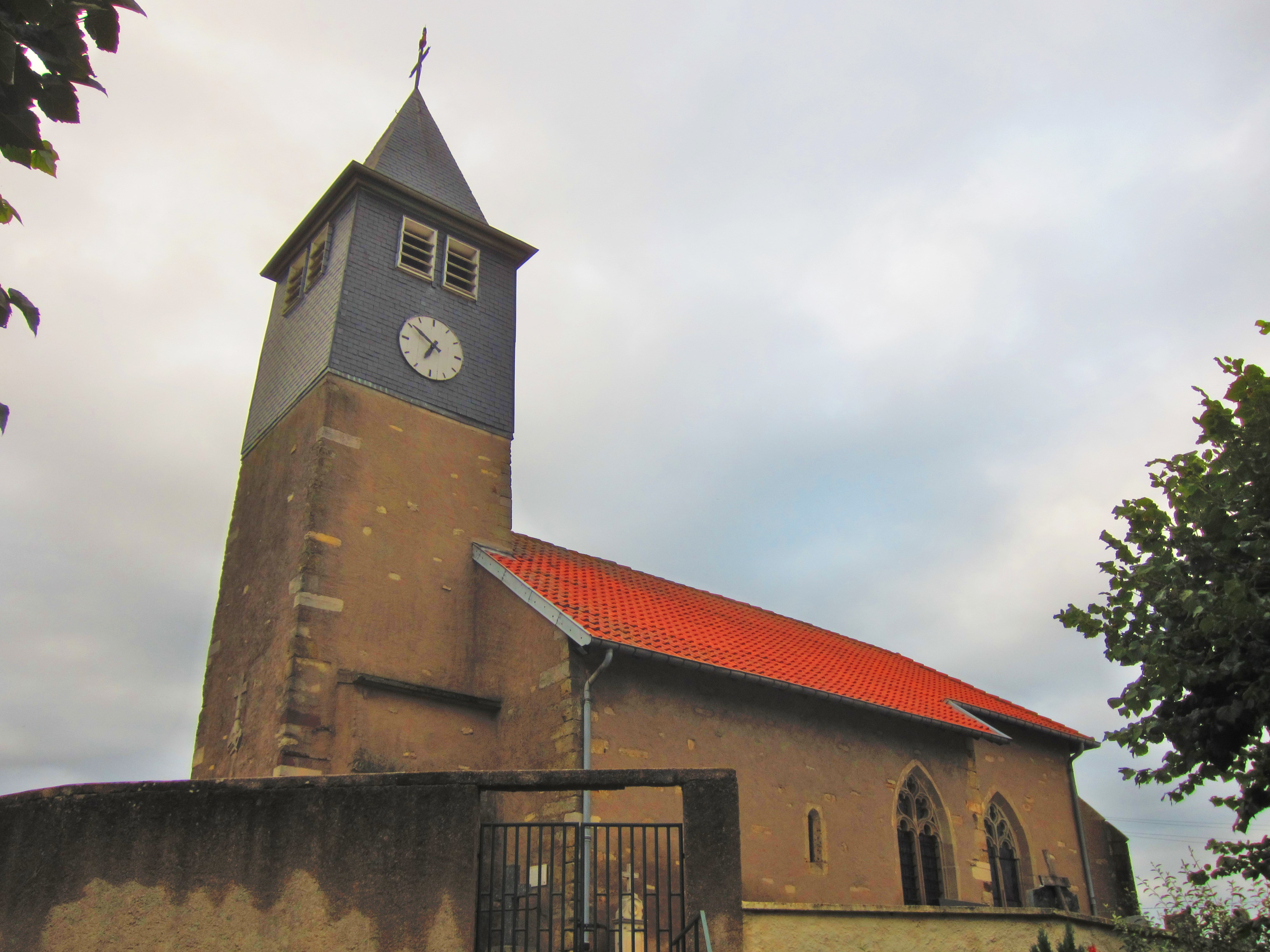
- The church in Lezey

- Coat of arms
- Location of Lezey
- Location within France Location within Grand Est
- Coordinates: 48°45′10″N 6°37′47″E
- Country: France
- Region: Grand Est
- Department: Moselle
- Arrondissement: Sarrebourg-Château-Salins
- Canton: Le Saulnois
- Intercommunality: CC du Saulnois

Government
  - Mayor (2022–2026): Boris Bellanger
- Area^{1}: 7.51 km^{2} (2.90 sq mi)
- Elevation: 250 m (820 ft)
- Highest elevation: 262 m (860 ft)
- Lowest elevation: 200 m (660 ft)
- Population (2023): 90
  - Density: 12/km^{2} (31/sq mi)
- Time zone: UTC+01:00 (CET)
  - Summer (DST): UTC+02:00 (CEST)
- INSEE/Postal code: 57399 /57630
- ^{1} French Land Register data, which excludes lakes, ponds, glaciers > 1 km^{2} (0.386 sq mi or 247 acres) and river estuaries.

Lezey (French pronunciation: [ləzɛ]; German: Litzingen) is a commune in the Moselle department in Grand Est in north-eastern France.

== See also ==
- Communes of the Moselle department
