= Manhoué =

- Commune
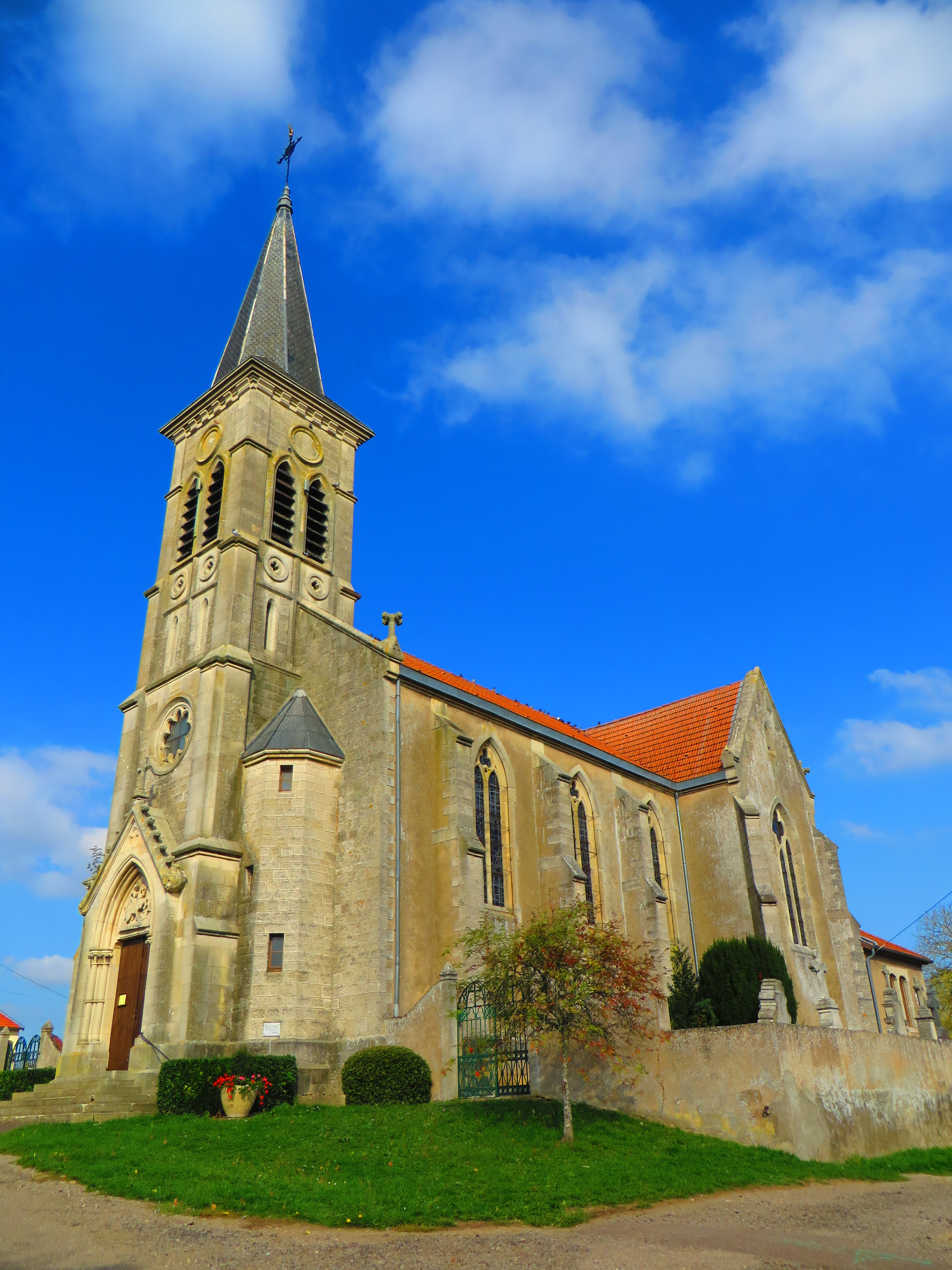
- The church in Manhoué

- Coat of arms
- Location of Manhoué
- Location within France Location within Grand Est
- Coordinates: 48°49′36″N 6°20′24″E
- Country: France
- Region: Grand Est
- Department: Moselle
- Arrondissement: Sarrebourg-Château-Salins
- Canton: Le Saulnois
- Intercommunality: CC du Saulnois

Government
  - Mayor (2020–2026): Nicolas Karmann
- Area^{1}: 4.1 km^{2} (1.6 sq mi)
- Elevation: 250 m (820 ft)
- Highest elevation: 271 m (889 ft)
- Lowest elevation: 190 m (620 ft)
- Population (2023): 143
  - Density: 35/km^{2} (90/sq mi)
- Time zone: UTC+01:00 (CET)
  - Summer (DST): UTC+02:00 (CEST)
- INSEE/Postal code: 57440 /57590
- ^{1} French Land Register data, which excludes lakes, ponds, glaciers > 1 km^{2} (0.386 sq mi or 247 acres) and river estuaries.

Manhoué (French pronunciation: [manwe]; German: Manwald) is a commune in the Moselle department in Grand Est in north-eastern France.

== See also ==
- Communes of the Moselle department
