= Attilloncourt =

- Commune
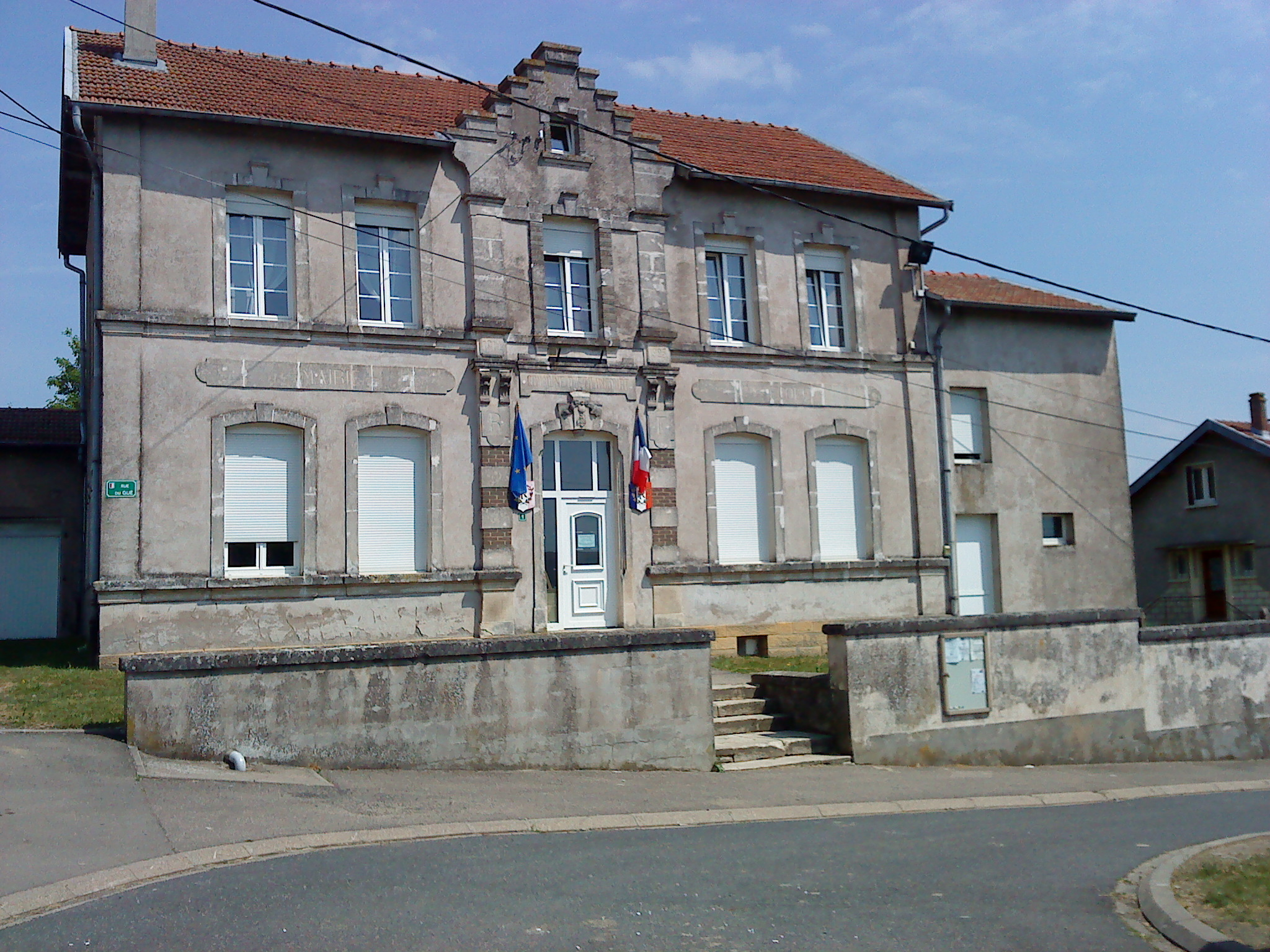
- Town hall

- Coat of arms
- Location of Attilloncourt
- Location within France Location within Grand Est
- Coordinates: 48°47′13″N 6°22′53″E
- Country: France
- Region: Grand Est
- Department: Moselle
- Arrondissement: Sarrebourg-Château-Salins
- Canton: Le Saulnois
- Intercommunality: CC Saulnois

Government
  - Mayor (2020–2026): Patrick Gazin
- Area^{1}: 3.37 km^{2} (1.30 sq mi)
- Elevation: 200 m (660 ft)
- Highest elevation: 293 m (961 ft)
- Lowest elevation: 195 m (640 ft)
- Population (2023): 98
  - Density: 29/km^{2} (75/sq mi)
- Time zone: UTC+01:00 (CET)
  - Summer (DST): UTC+02:00 (CEST)
- INSEE/Postal code: 57036 /57170
- ^{1} French Land Register data, which excludes lakes, ponds, glaciers > 1 km^{2} (0.386 sq mi or 247 acres) and river estuaries.

Attilloncourt (German: Edelinghofen) is a commune in the Moselle department in Grand Est in northeastern France.

== Population ==
Historical population
Year	Pop.	±% p.a.
1968	113	—
1975	117	+0.50%
1982	92	−3.38%
1990	96	+0.53%
1999	94	−0.23%
2007	98	+0.52%
2012	106	+1.58%
2017	105	−0.19%
2023	98	−1.14%
Source: INSEE

== See also ==
- Communes of the Moselle department
