= Achain =

- Commune
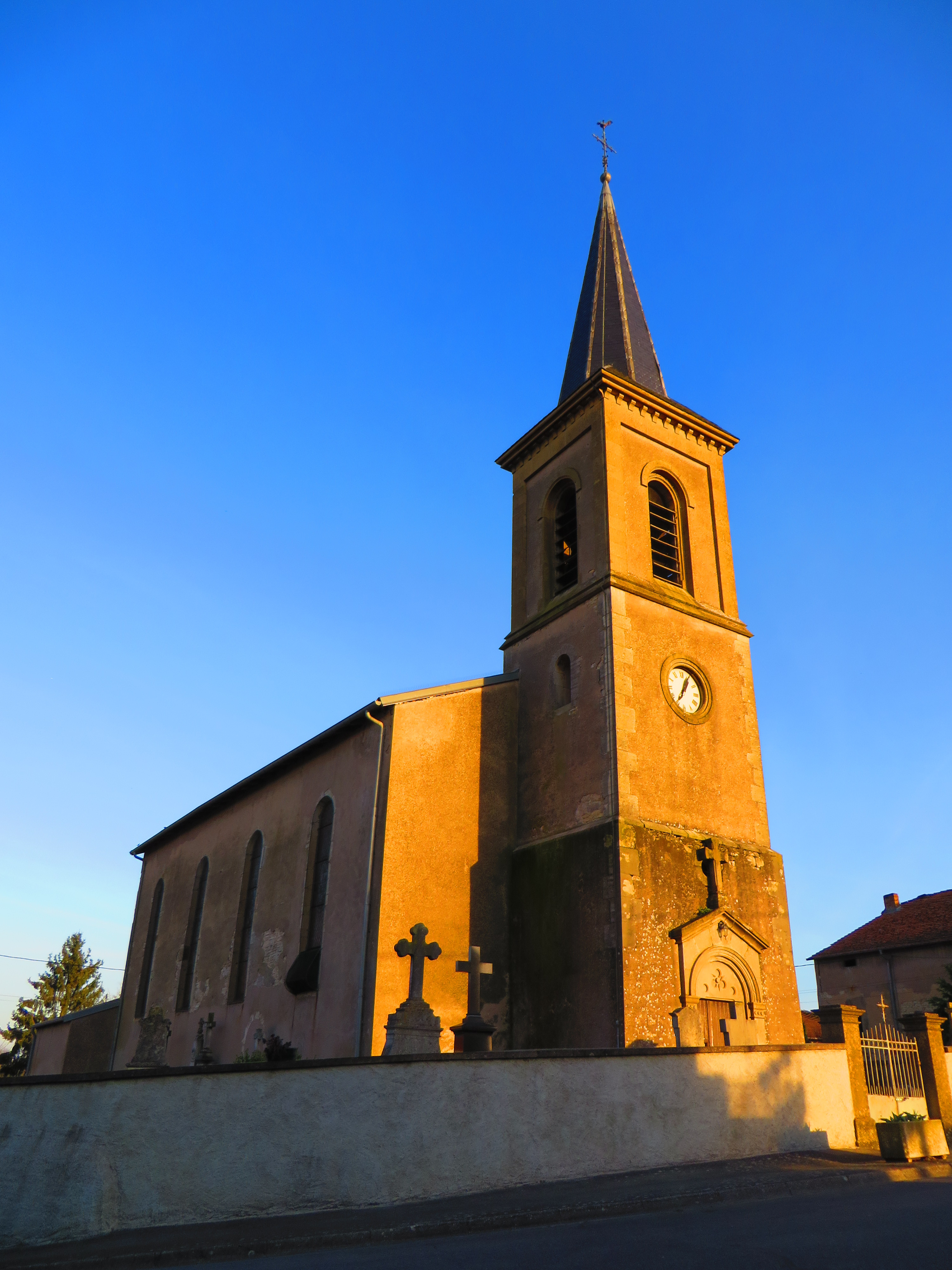
- The church in Achain

- Coat of arms
- Location of Achain
- Location within France Location within Grand Est
- Coordinates: 48°54′52″N 6°35′34″E
- Country: France
- Region: Grand Est
- Department: Moselle
- Arrondissement: Sarrebourg-Château-Salins
- Canton: Le Saulnois
- Intercommunality: Saulnois

Government
  - Mayor (2020–2026): Louis Renard
- Area^{1}: 4.79 km^{2} (1.85 sq mi)
- Highest elevation: 330 m (1,080 ft)
- Lowest elevation: 227 m (745 ft)
- Population (2023): 76
  - Density: 16/km^{2} (41/sq mi)
- Time zone: UTC+01:00 (CET)
  - Summer (DST): UTC+02:00 (CEST)
- INSEE/Postal code: 57004 /57340
- ^{1} French Land Register data, which excludes lakes, ponds, glaciers > 1 km^{2} (0.386 sq mi or 247 acres) and river estuaries.

Achain (French pronunciation: [aʃɛ̃]; German: Eschen) is a commune in the Moselle department in Grand Est in northeastern France.

== Population ==
Historical population
Year	Pop.	±% p.a.
1968	97	—
1975	89	−1.22%
1982	79	−1.69%
1990	95	+2.33%
1999	95	+0.00%
2007	92	−0.40%
2012	82	−2.28%
2017	82	+0.00%
2023	76	−1.26%
Source: INSEE

== See also ==
- Communes of the Moselle department
