= Xanrey =

- Commune
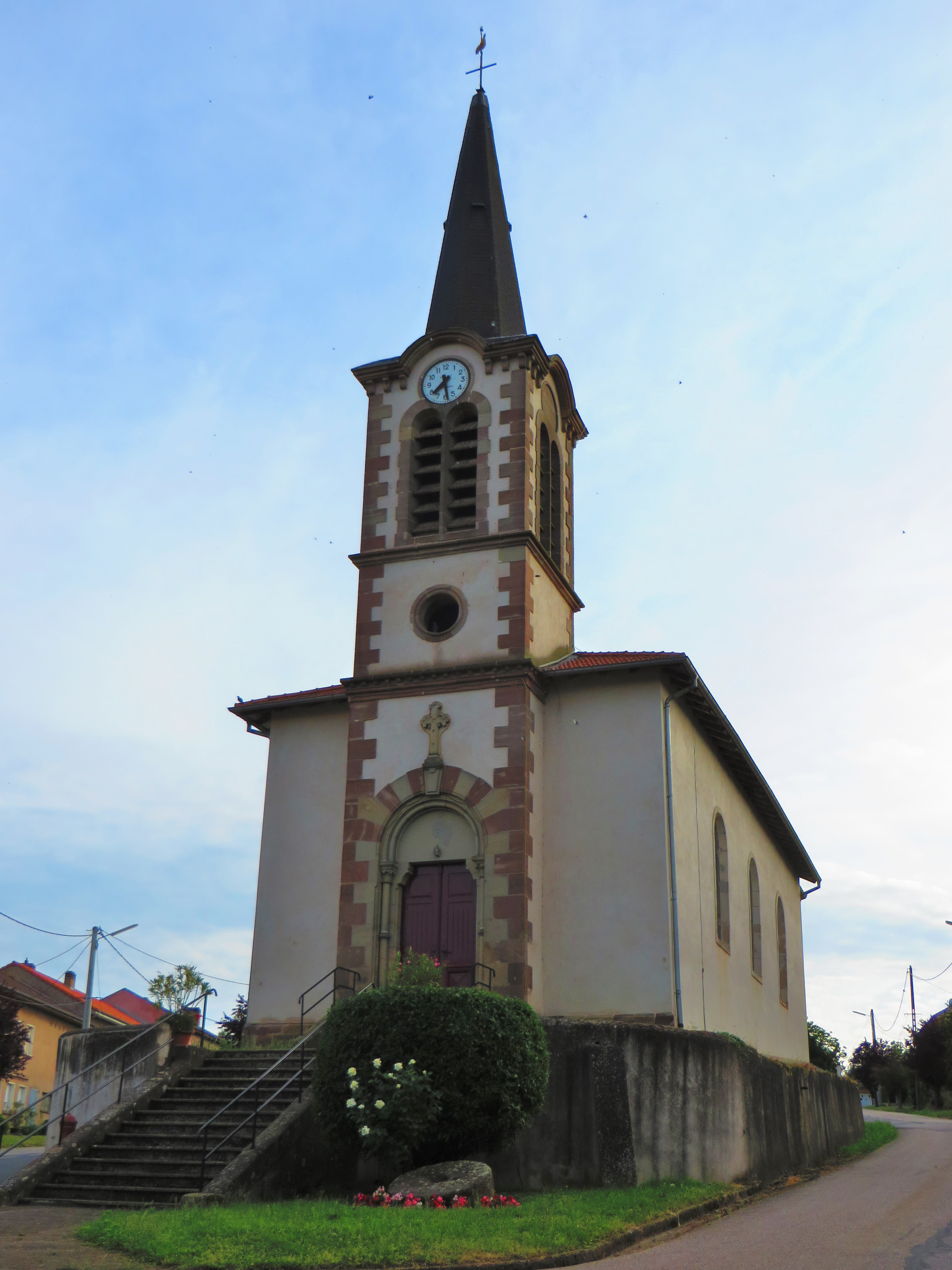
- The church in Xanrey

- Coat of arms
- Location of Xanrey
- Location within France Location within Grand Est
- Coordinates: 48°45′05″N 6°34′59″E
- Country: France
- Region: Grand Est
- Department: Moselle
- Arrondissement: Sarrebourg-Château-Salins
- Canton: Le Saulnois
- Intercommunality: Saulnois

Government
  - Mayor (2020–2026): Carole Remillon
- Area^{1}: 7.81 km^{2} (3.02 sq mi)
- Elevation: 220 m (720 ft)
- Highest elevation: 282 m (925 ft)
- Lowest elevation: 200 m (660 ft)
- Population (2023): 110
  - Density: 14/km^{2} (36/sq mi)
- Time zone: UTC+01:00 (CET)
  - Summer (DST): UTC+02:00 (CEST)
- INSEE/Postal code: 57754 /57630
- ^{1} French Land Register data, which excludes lakes, ponds, glaciers > 1 km^{2} (0.386 sq mi or 247 acres) and river estuaries.

Xanrey is a commune in the Moselle department in Grand Est in north-eastern France.

== Population ==
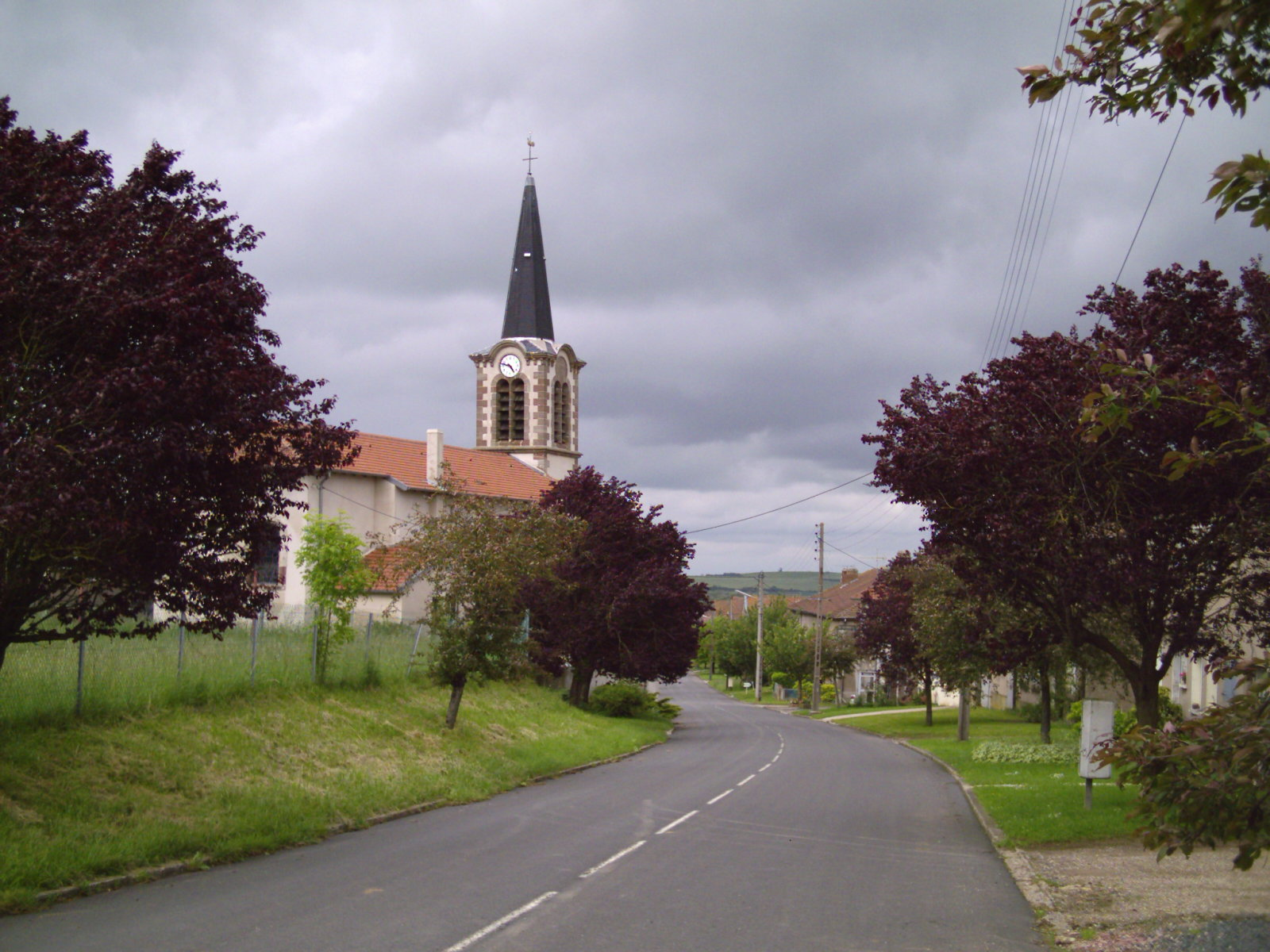

Historical population
Year	Pop.	±% p.a.
1968	143	—
1975	127	−1.68%
1982	117	−1.16%
1990	114	−0.32%
1999	126	+1.12%
2007	104	−2.37%
2012	116	+2.21%
2017	116	+0.00%
2023	110	−0.88%
Source: INSEE

== See also ==
- Communes of the Moselle department
