= Molring =

- Commune
- Coat of arms
- Location of Molring
- Location within France Location within Grand Est
- Coordinates: 48°53′14″N 6°49′20″E
- Country: France
- Region: Grand Est
- Department: Moselle
- Arrondissement: Sarrebourg-Château-Salins
- Canton: Le Saulnois
- Intercommunality: Saulnois

Government
  - Mayor (2020–2026): Maurice Bello
- Area^{1}: 3.26 km^{2} (1.26 sq mi)
- Elevation: 238 m (781 ft)
- Highest elevation: 257 m (843 ft)
- Lowest elevation: 229 m (751 ft)
- Population (2023): 12
  - Density: 3.7/km^{2} (9.5/sq mi)
- Time zone: UTC+01:00 (CET)
  - Summer (DST): UTC+02:00 (CEST)
- INSEE/Postal code: 57470 /57670
- ^{1} French Land Register data, which excludes lakes, ponds, glaciers > 1 km^{2} (0.386 sq mi or 247 acres) and river estuaries.

Molring (French pronunciation: [mɔlʁɛ̃]; German: Molringen) is a commune in the Moselle department in Grand Est in north-eastern France.

== Population ==
Historical population
Year	Pop.	±% p.a.
1968	26	—
1975	21	−3.00%
1982	15	−4.69%
1990	16	+0.81%
1999	17	+0.68%
2007	10	−6.42%
2012	8	−4.36%
2017	5	−8.97%
2023	12	+15.71%
Source: INSEE

== See also ==
- Communes of the Moselle department
