= Vittersbourg =

- Commune
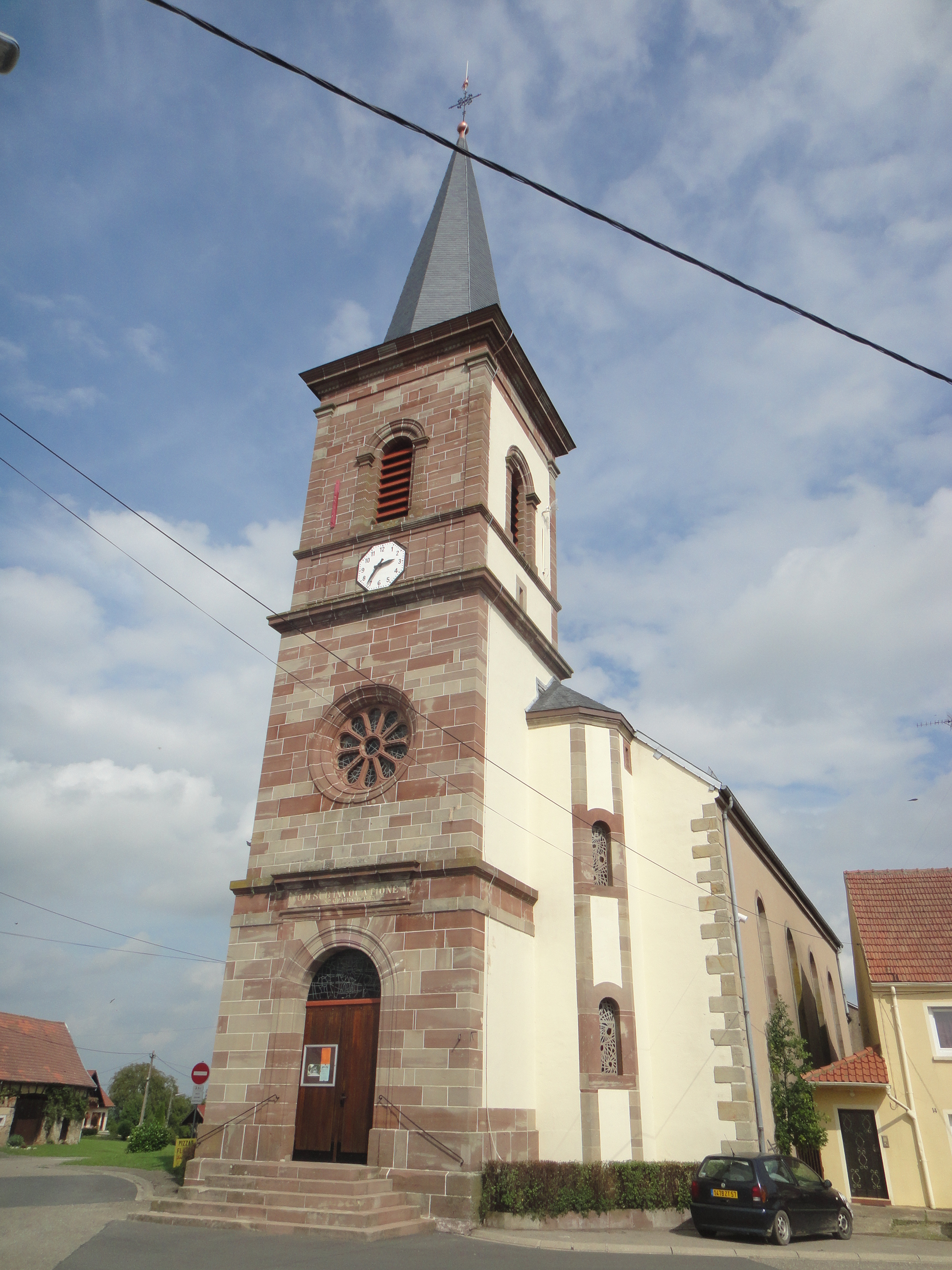
- The church in Vittersbourg

- Coat of arms
- Location of Vittersbourg
- Location within France Location within Grand Est
- Coordinates: 48°57′03″N 6°55′46″E
- Country: France
- Region: Grand Est
- Department: Moselle
- Arrondissement: Sarrebourg-Château-Salins
- Canton: Le Saulnois
- Intercommunality: Saulnois

Government
  - Mayor (2020–2026): Gilbert Rostoucher
- Area^{1}: 7.13 km^{2} (2.75 sq mi)
- Highest elevation: 253 m (830 ft)
- Lowest elevation: 218 m (715 ft)
- Population (2023): 334
  - Density: 46.8/km^{2} (121/sq mi)
- Time zone: UTC+01:00 (CET)
  - Summer (DST): UTC+02:00 (CEST)
- INSEE/Postal code: 57725 /57670
- ^{1} French Land Register data, which excludes lakes, ponds, glaciers > 1 km^{2} (0.386 sq mi or 247 acres) and river estuaries.

Vittersbourg (German: Wittersburg) is a commune in the Moselle department in Grand Est in north-eastern France.

== Etymology ==
The toponym Vittersbourg is of Germanic origin, deriving from anthroponym Widhari.

== See also ==
- Communes of the Moselle department
