= Bellange, Moselle =

Bellange
- Commune
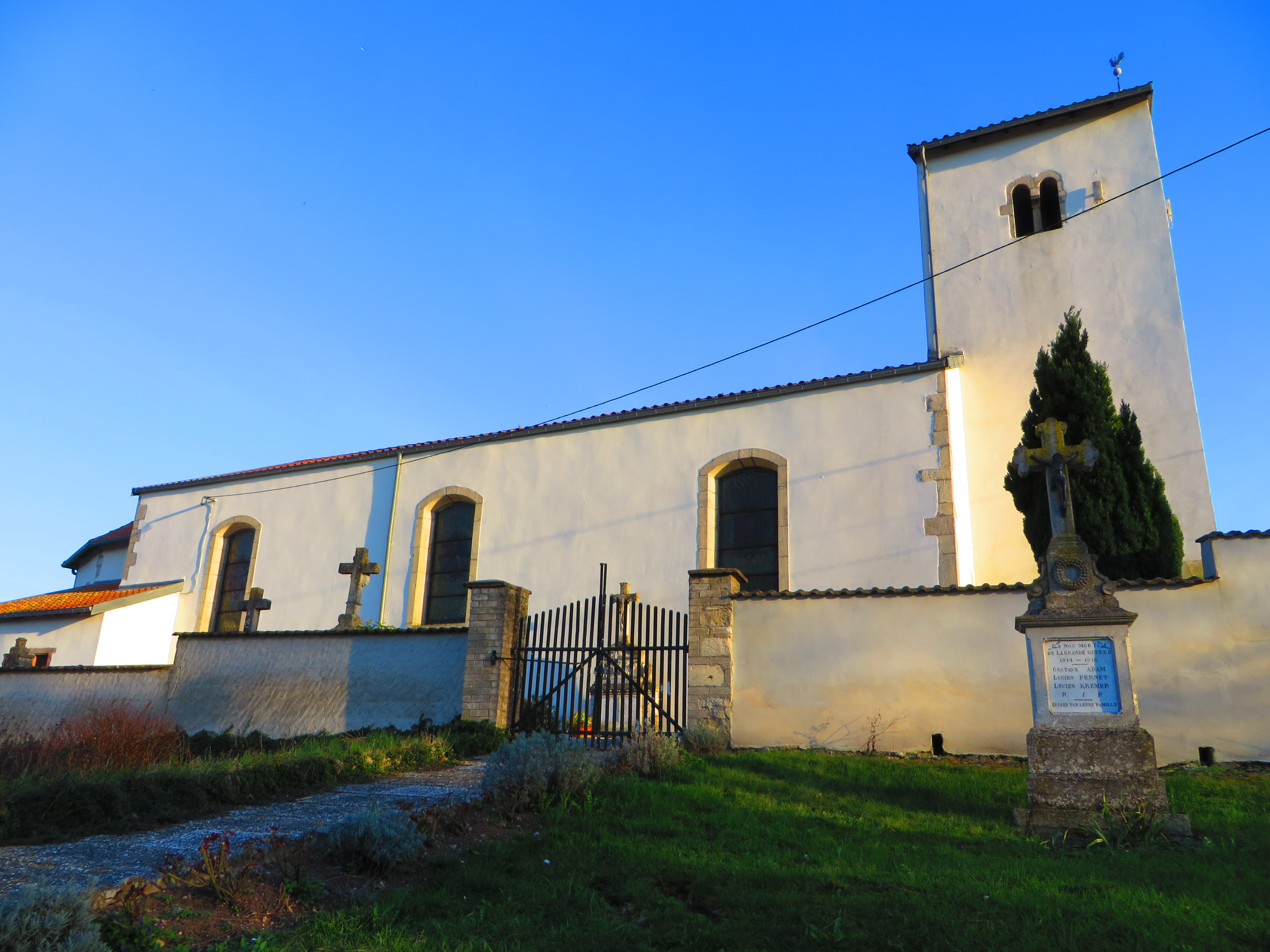
- The church in Bellange

- Coat of arms
- Location of Bellange
- Location within France Location within Grand Est
- Coordinates: 48°54′09″N 6°34′42″E
- Country: France
- Region: Grand Est
- Department: Moselle
- Arrondissement: Sarrebourg-Château-Salins
- Canton: Le Saulnois
- Intercommunality: CC Saulnois

Government
  - Mayor (2020–2026): Marcel Campadieu
- Area^{1}: 3.83 km^{2} (1.48 sq mi)
- Elevation: 230 m (750 ft)
- Highest elevation: 327 m (1,073 ft)
- Lowest elevation: 217 m (712 ft)
- Population (2023): 53
  - Density: 14/km^{2} (36/sq mi)
- Time zone: UTC+01:00 (CET)
  - Summer (DST): UTC+02:00 (CEST)
- INSEE/Postal code: 57059 /57340
- ^{1} French Land Register data, which excludes lakes, ponds, glaciers > 1 km^{2} (0.386 sq mi or 247 acres) and river estuaries.

Bellange (French pronunciation: [bɛlɑ̃ʒ]; German: Böllingen) is a commune in the Moselle department in Grand Est in northeastern France.

== Population ==
Historical population
Year	Pop.	±% p.a.
1968	66	—
1975	52	−3.35%
1982	50	−0.56%
1990	35	−4.36%
1999	44	+2.58%
2007	55	+2.83%
2012	61	+2.09%
2017	55	−2.05%
2023	58	+0.89%
Source: INSEE

== See also ==
- Communes of the Moselle department
