= Réning =

- Commune
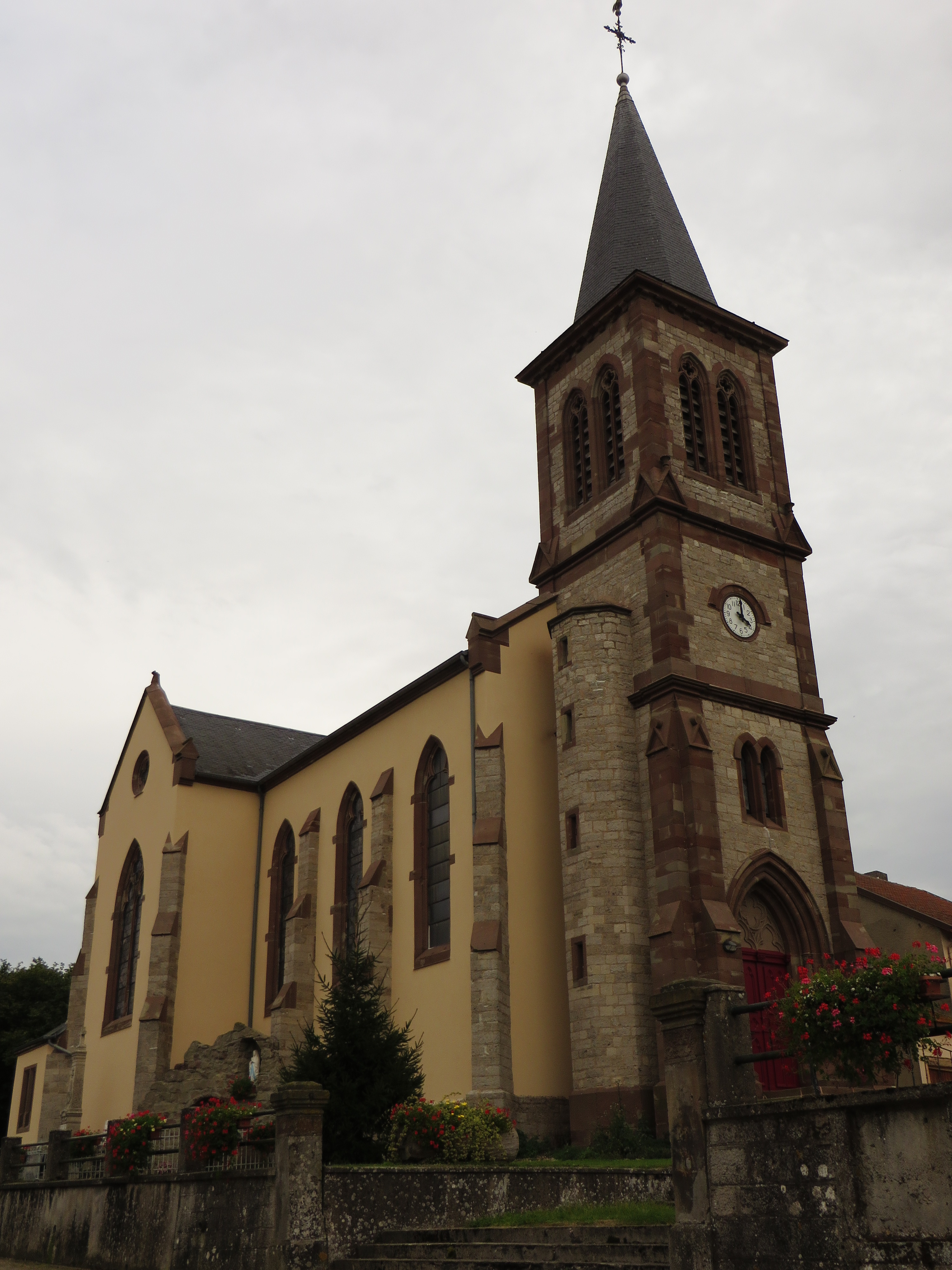
- The church in Réning

- Coat of arms
- Location of Réning
- Location within France Location within Grand Est
- Coordinates: 48°57′20″N 6°51′12″E
- Country: France
- Region: Grand Est
- Department: Moselle
- Arrondissement: Sarrebourg-Château-Salins
- Canton: Le Saulnois
- Intercommunality: CC du Saulnois

Government
  - Mayor (2020–2026): Michel Festor
- Area^{1}: 3.95 km^{2} (1.53 sq mi)
- Elevation: 210 m (690 ft)
- Population (2023): 127
  - Density: 32.2/km^{2} (83.3/sq mi)
- Time zone: UTC+01:00 (CET)
  - Summer (DST): UTC+02:00 (CEST)
- INSEE/Postal code: 57573 /57670
- ^{1} French Land Register data, which excludes lakes, ponds, glaciers > 1 km^{2} (0.386 sq mi or 247 acres) and river estuaries.

Réning (French pronunciation: [ʁenɛ̃]; German: Reiningen) is a commune in the Moselle department in Grand Est in north-eastern France.

== See also ==
- Communes of the Moselle department
- Parc naturel régional de Lorraine
