= Guinzeling =

- Commune
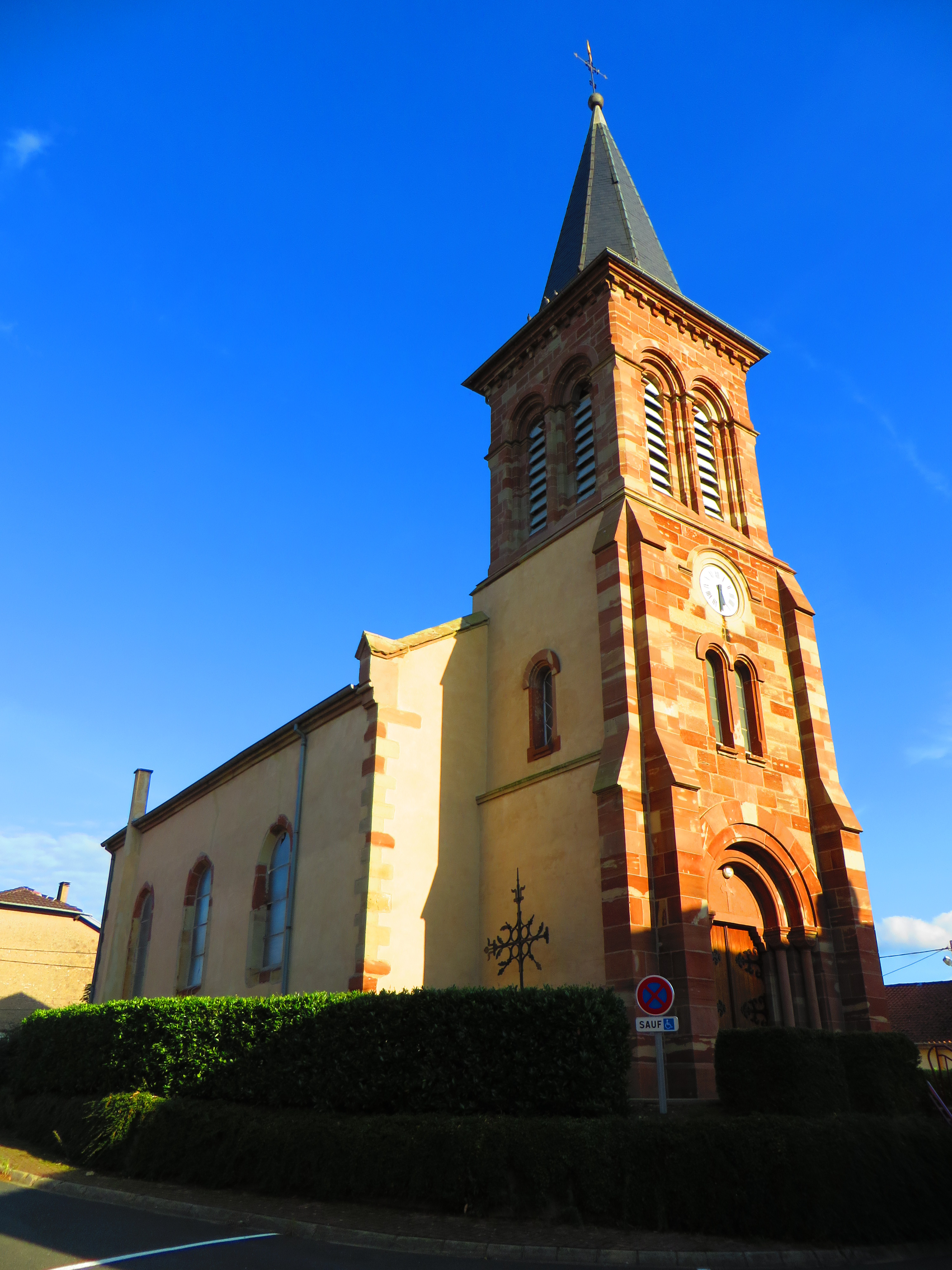
- The church in Guinzeling

- Coat of arms
- Location of Guinzeling
- Location within France Location within Grand Est
- Coordinates: 48°52′48″N 6°50′35″E
- Country: France
- Region: Grand Est
- Department: Moselle
- Arrondissement: Sarrebourg-Château-Salins
- Canton: Le Saulnois
- Intercommunality: CC du Saulnois

Government
  - Mayor (2020–2026): Maurice Gering
- Area^{1}: 4.83 km^{2} (1.86 sq mi)
- Elevation: 230 m (750 ft)
- Highest elevation: 269 m (883 ft)
- Lowest elevation: 232 m (761 ft)
- Population (2023): 61
  - Density: 13/km^{2} (33/sq mi)
- Time zone: UTC+01:00 (CET)
  - Summer (DST): UTC+02:00 (CEST)
- INSEE/Postal code: 57278 /57670
- ^{1} French Land Register data, which excludes lakes, ponds, glaciers > 1 km^{2} (0.386 sq mi or 247 acres) and river estuaries.

Guinzeling (French pronunciation: [ɡɛ̃zlɛ̃]; German: Geinslingen) is a commune in the Moselle department in Grand Est in north-eastern France.

== See also ==
- Communes of the Moselle department
