= Lostroff =

- Commune
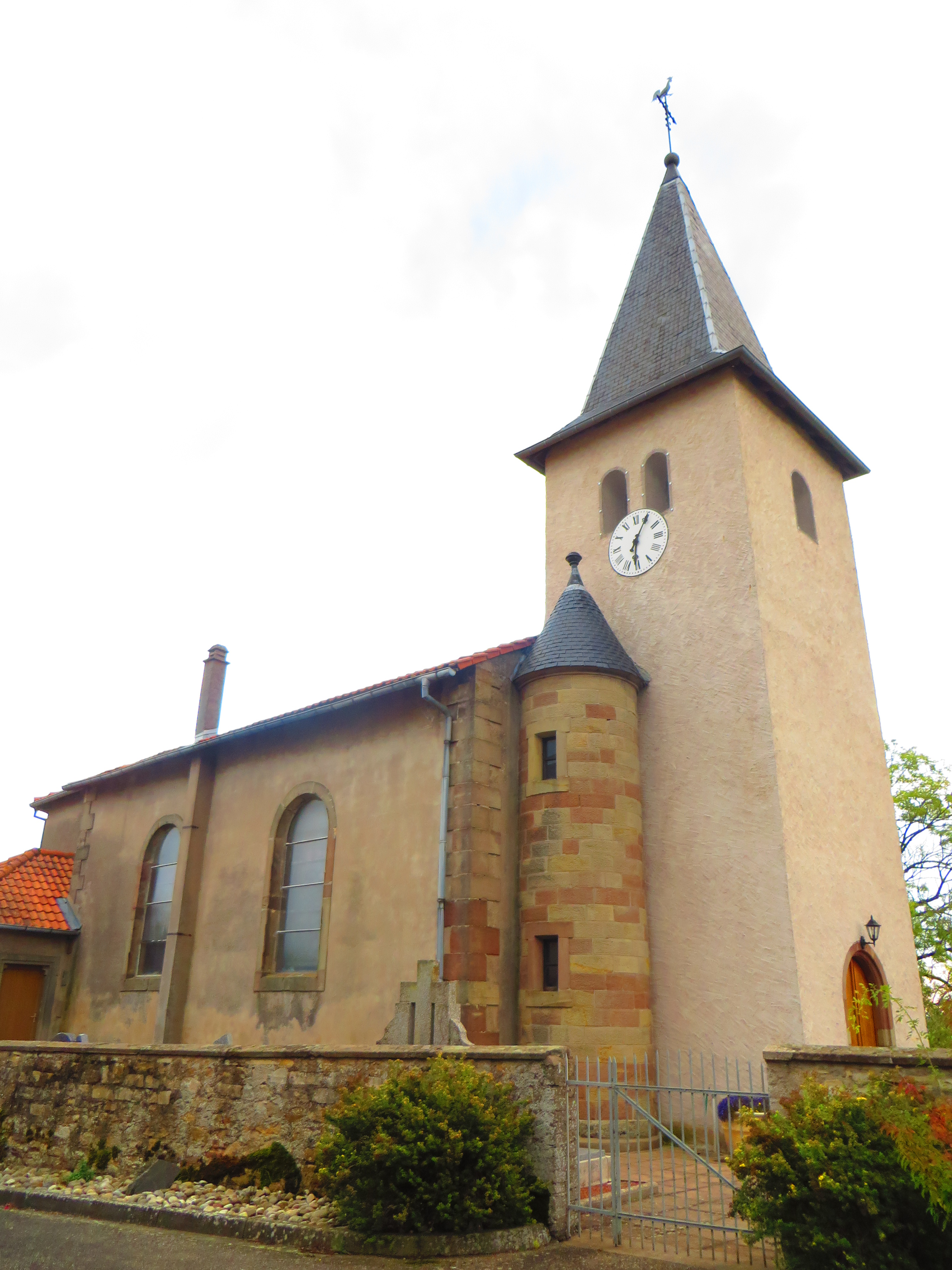
- The church in Lostroff

- Coat of arms
- Location of Lostroff
- Location within France Location within Grand Est
- Coordinates: 48°51′35″N 6°51′13″E
- Country: France
- Region: Grand Est
- Department: Moselle
- Arrondissement: Sarrebourg-Château-Salins
- Canton: Le Saulnois
- Intercommunality: CC du Saulnois

Government
  - Mayor (2020–2026): Gaël Beyel
- Area^{1}: 4.96 km^{2} (1.92 sq mi)
- Elevation: 250 m (820 ft)
- Highest elevation: 285 m (935 ft)
- Lowest elevation: 222 m (728 ft)
- Population (2023): 71
  - Density: 14/km^{2} (37/sq mi)
- Time zone: UTC+01:00 (CET)
  - Summer (DST): UTC+02:00 (CEST)
- INSEE/Postal code: 57417 /57670
- ^{1} French Land Register data, which excludes lakes, ponds, glaciers > 1 km^{2} (0.386 sq mi or 247 acres) and river estuaries.

Lostroff (French pronunciation: [lɔstʁɔf]; German: Losdorf) is a commune in the Moselle department in Grand Est in north-eastern France.

== See also ==
- Communes of the Moselle department
