= Neufvillage =

- Commune
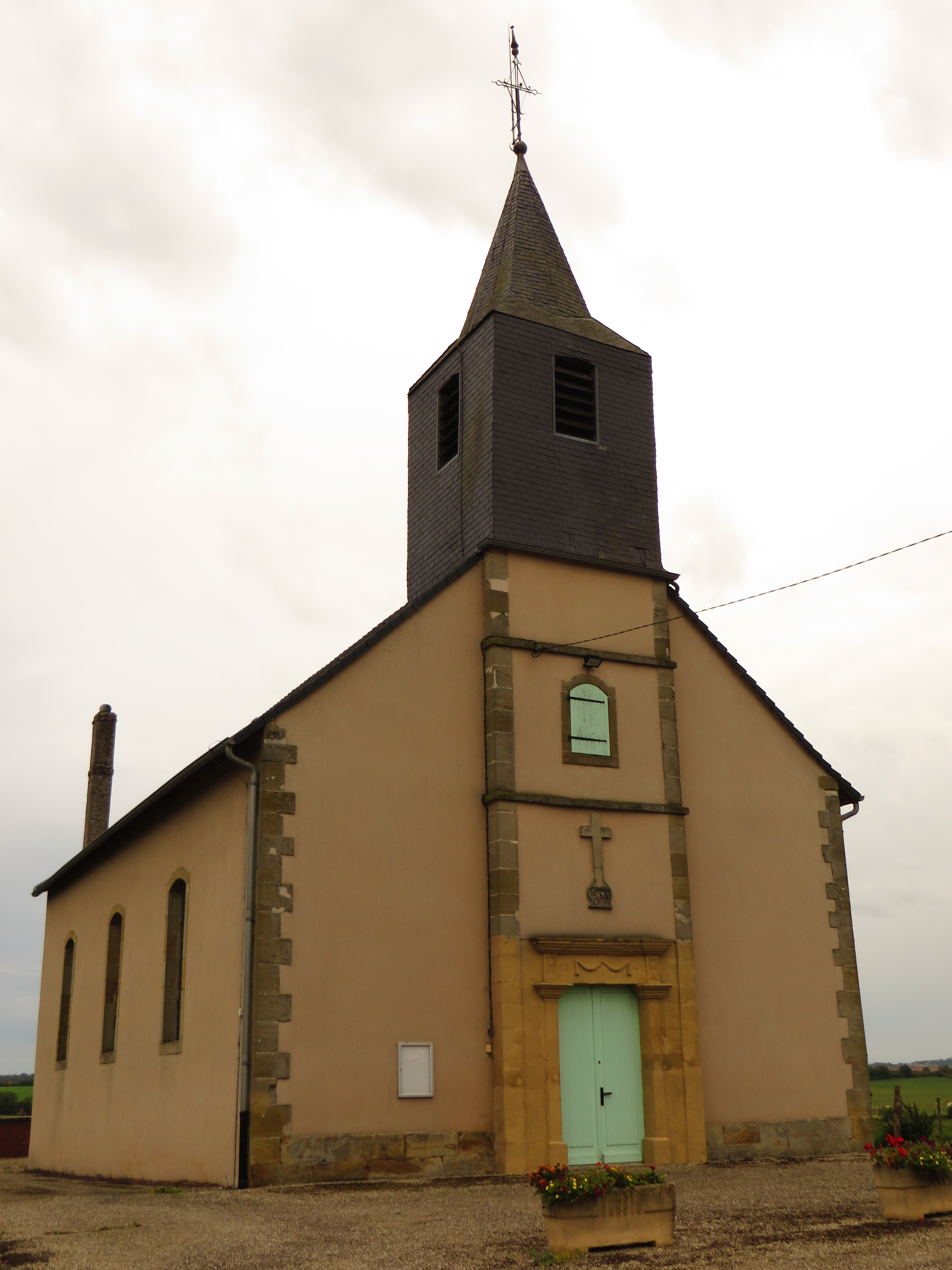
- The church in Neufvillage

- Coat of arms
- Location of Neufvillage
- Location within France Location within Grand Est
- Coordinates: 48°56′16″N 6°46′54″E
- Country: France
- Region: Grand Est
- Department: Moselle
- Arrondissement: Sarrebourg-Château-Salins
- Canton: Le Saulnois
- Intercommunality: CC du Saulnois

Government
  - Mayor (2020–2026): Jean-Marie Roch
- Area^{1}: 0.61 km^{2} (0.24 sq mi)
- Elevation: 225 m (738 ft)
- Highest elevation: 233 m (764 ft)
- Lowest elevation: 220 m (720 ft)
- Population (2023): 49
  - Density: 80/km^{2} (210/sq mi)
- Time zone: UTC+01:00 (CET)
  - Summer (DST): UTC+02:00 (CEST)
- INSEE/Postal code: 57501 /57670
- Website: www.neufvillage.fr
- ^{1} French Land Register data, which excludes lakes, ponds, glaciers > 1 km^{2} (0.386 sq mi or 247 acres) and river estuaries.

Neufvillage (French pronunciation: [nøvilaʒ]; German: Neudörfel, Neudorf an der Albe) is a commune in the Moselle department in Grand Est in north-eastern France.

== See also ==
- Communes of the Moselle department
