= Pévange =

- Commune
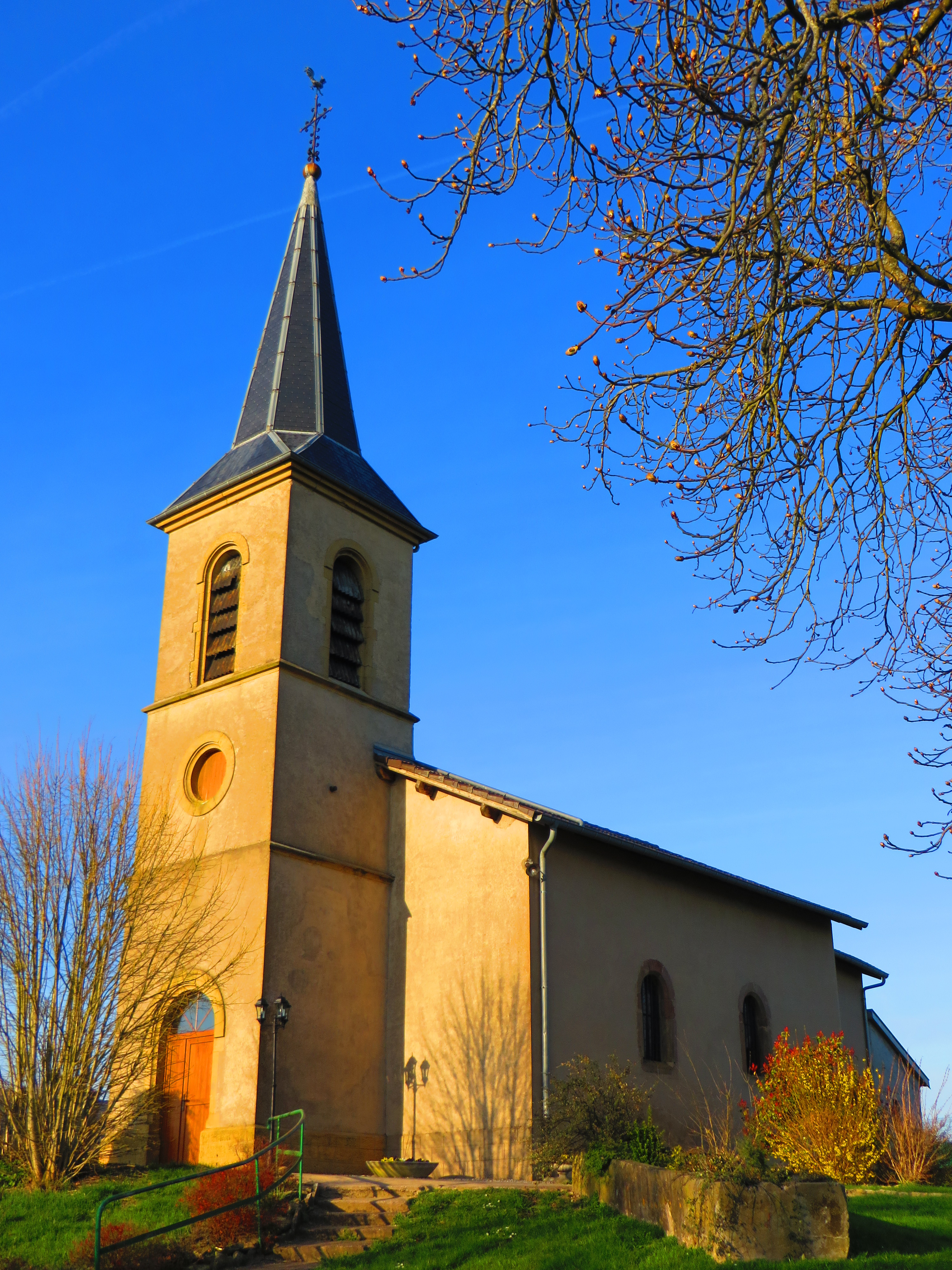
- Saint Martin church in Pévange

- Coat of arms
- Location of Pévange
- Location within France Location within Grand Est
- Coordinates: 48°54′30″N 6°37′08″E
- Country: France
- Region: Grand Est
- Department: Moselle
- Arrondissement: Sarrebourg-Château-Salins
- Canton: Le Saulnois
- Intercommunality: CC du Saulnois

Government
  - Mayor (2020–2026): Yannick Chateaux
- Area^{1}: 1.94 km^{2} (0.75 sq mi)
- Elevation: 250 m (820 ft)
- Highest elevation: 259 m (850 ft)
- Lowest elevation: 222 m (728 ft)
- Population (2023): 40
  - Density: 21/km^{2} (53/sq mi)
- Time zone: UTC+01:00 (CET)
  - Summer (DST): UTC+02:00 (CEST)
- INSEE/Postal code: 57539 /57340
- ^{1} French Land Register data, which excludes lakes, ponds, glaciers > 1 km^{2} (0.386 sq mi or 247 acres) and river estuaries.

Pévange (French pronunciation: [pevɑ̃ʒ]) is a commune in the Moselle department in Grand Est in north-eastern France.

== See also ==
- Communes of the Moselle department
