= Bréhain =

- Commune
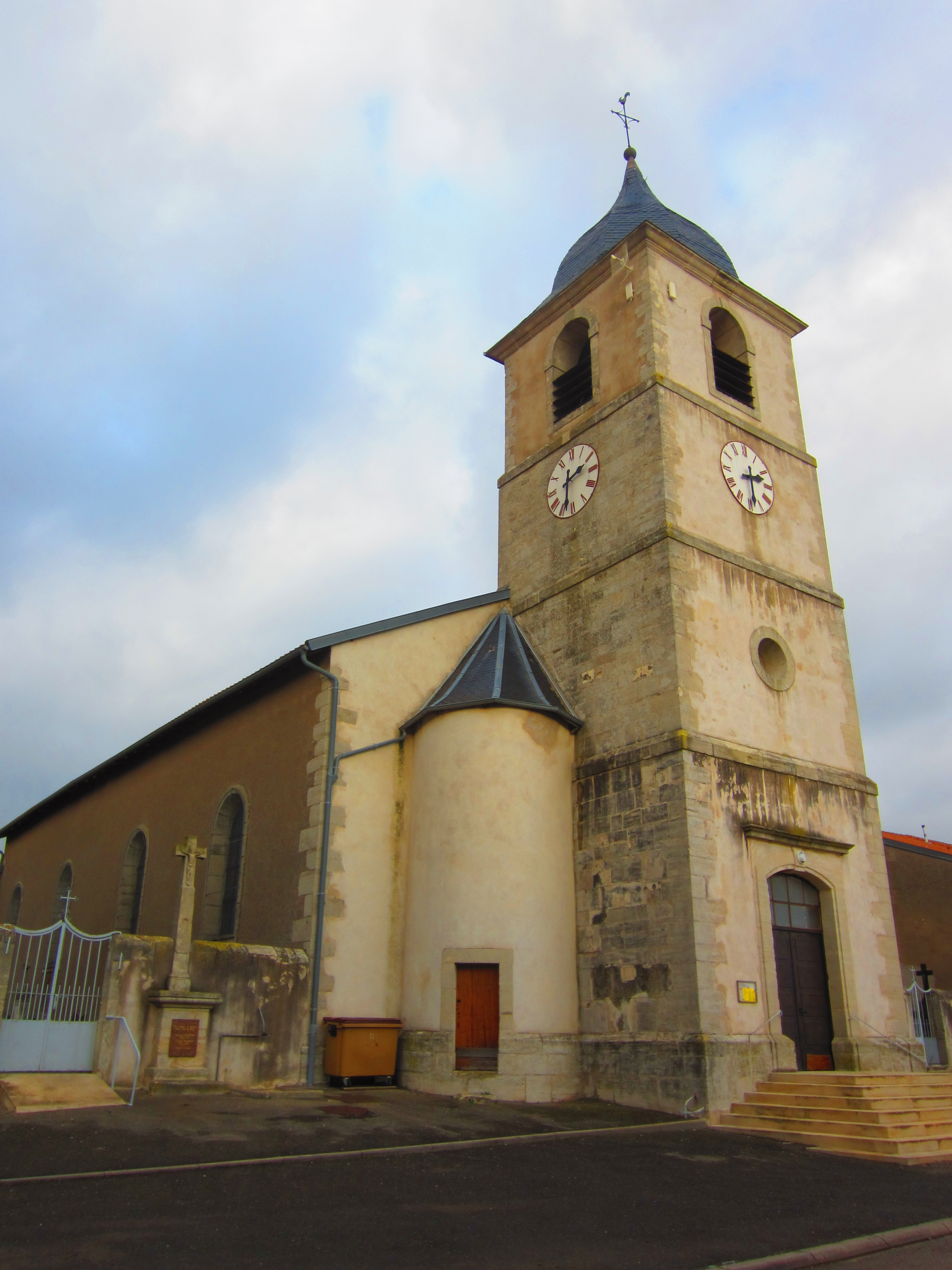
- The church in Bréhain

- Coat of arms
- Location of Bréhain
- Location within France Location within Grand Est
- Coordinates: 48°54′38″N 6°32′19″E
- Country: France
- Region: Grand Est
- Department: Moselle
- Arrondissement: Sarrebourg-Château-Salins
- Canton: Le Saulnois
- Intercommunality: CC Saulnois

Government
  - Mayor (2020–2026): Roland Butlingaire
- Area^{1}: 3.59 km^{2} (1.39 sq mi)
- Elevation: 250 m (820 ft)
- Highest elevation: 314 m (1,030 ft)
- Lowest elevation: 244 m (801 ft)
- Population (2023): 97
  - Density: 27/km^{2} (70/sq mi)
- Time zone: UTC+01:00 (CET)
  - Summer (DST): UTC+02:00 (CEST)
- INSEE/Postal code: 57107 /57340
- ^{1} French Land Register data, which excludes lakes, ponds, glaciers > 1 km^{2} (0.386 sq mi or 247 acres) and river estuaries.

Bréhain (French pronunciation: [bʁe.ɛ̃]; German: Bruchheim) is a commune in the Moselle department in Grand Est in northeastern France.

== Population ==
Historical population

Year	Pop.	±% p.a.
1793	206	—
1821	262	+0.86%
1846	306	+0.62%
1871	263	−0.60%
1900	184	−1.22%
1926	157	−0.61%
1946	112	−1.67%
1962	101	−0.64%
1968	101	+0.00%

Year	Pop.	±% p.a.
1975	106	+0.69%
1982	80	−3.94%
1990	72	−1.31%
1999	75	+0.45%
2007	95	+3.00%
2012	107	+2.41%
2017	107	+0.00%
2023	97	−1.62%

Source: EHESS and INSEE (1968-2023)

== See also ==
- Communes of the Moselle department
