= Saint-Médard, Moselle =

Saint-Médard
- Commune
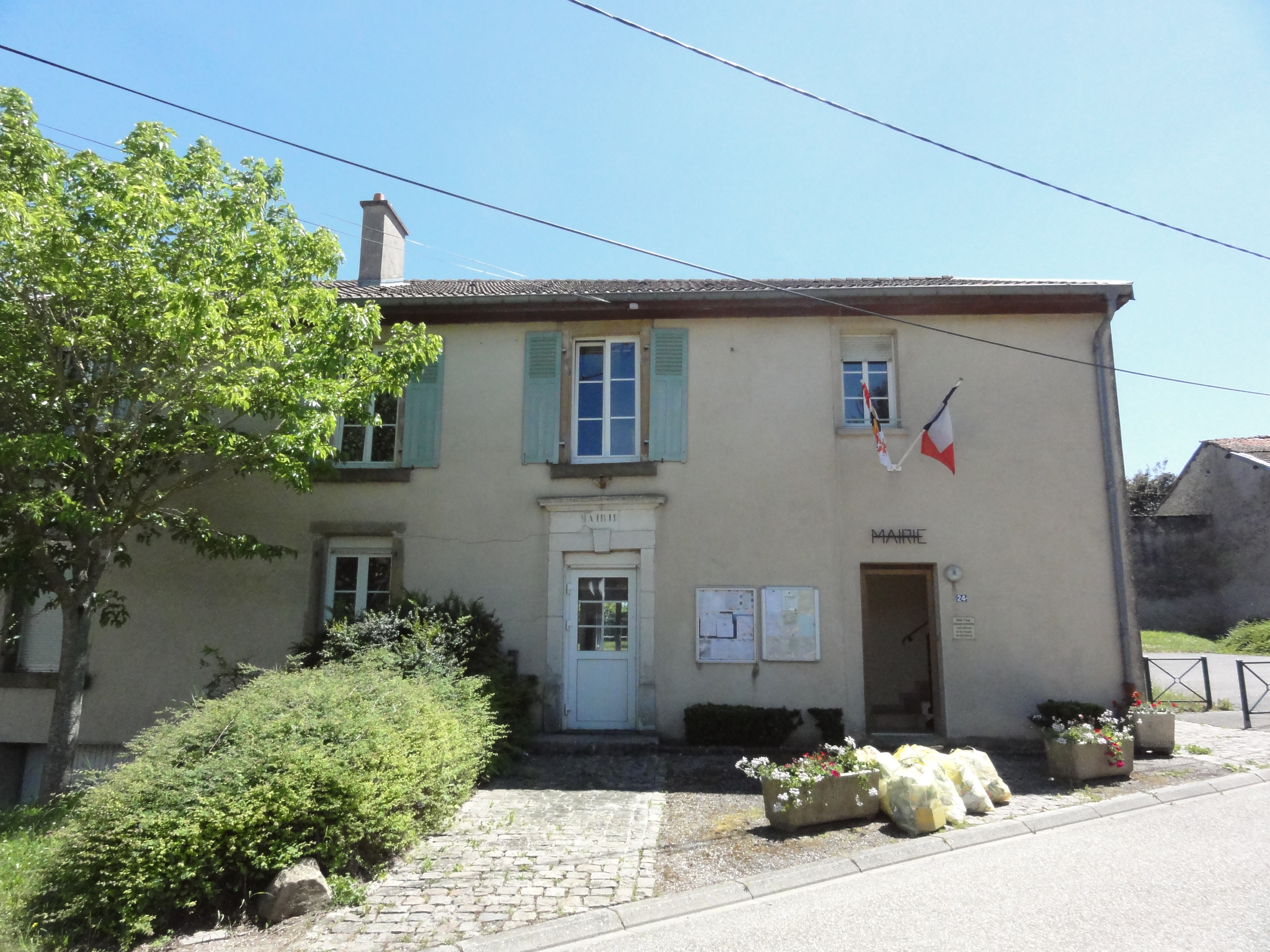
- The town hall in Saint-Médard

- Coat of arms
- Location of Saint-Médard
- Location within France Location within Grand Est
- Coordinates: 48°48′43″N 6°38′08″E
- Country: France
- Region: Grand Est
- Department: Moselle
- Arrondissement: Sarrebourg-Château-Salins
- Canton: Le Saulnois
- Intercommunality: CC Saulnois

Government
  - Mayor (2024–2026): Claude Vautrin
- Area^{1}: 9.89 km^{2} (3.82 sq mi)
- Elevation: 300 m (980 ft)
- Highest elevation: 333 m (1,093 ft)
- Lowest elevation: 199 m (653 ft)
- Population (2023): 107
  - Density: 10.8/km^{2} (28.0/sq mi)
- Time zone: UTC+01:00 (CET)
  - Summer (DST): UTC+02:00 (CEST)
- INSEE/Postal code: 57621 /57260
- ^{1} French Land Register data, which excludes lakes, ponds, glaciers > 1 km^{2} (0.386 sq mi or 247 acres) and river estuaries.

Saint-Médard (French pronunciation: [sɛ̃ medaʁ]; German: Sankt Medard) is a commune in the Moselle department in Grand Est in north-eastern France.

== See also ==
- Communes of the Moselle department
- Parc naturel régional de Lorraine
