= Ajoncourt =

- Commune
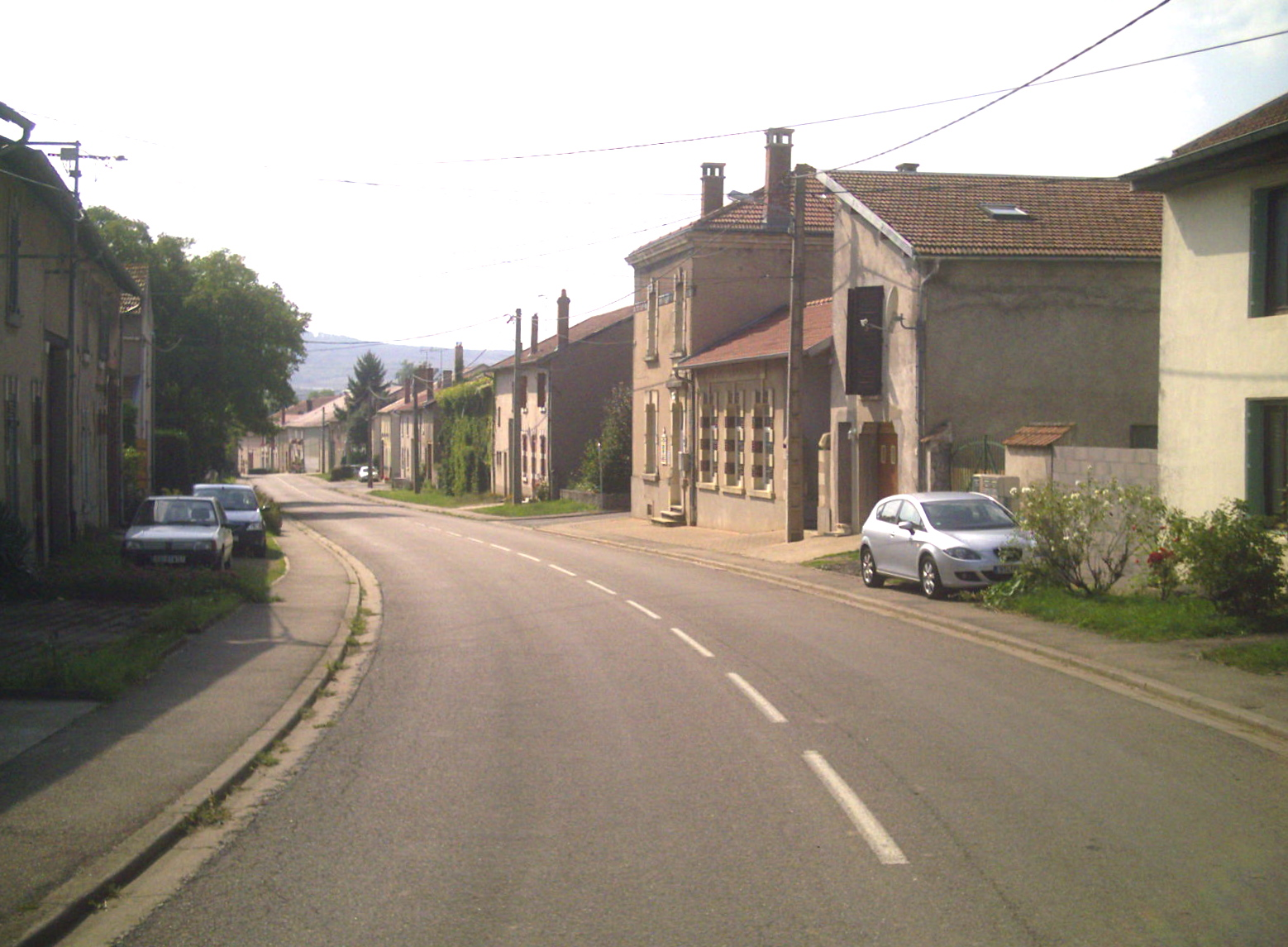
- A view within Ajoncourt

- Coat of arms
- Location of Ajoncourt
- Location within France Location within Grand Est
- Coordinates: 48°50′45″N 6°17′25″E
- Country: France
- Region: Grand Est
- Department: Moselle
- Arrondissement: Sarrebourg-Château-Salins
- Canton: Le Saulnois
- Intercommunality: Saulnois

Government
  - Mayor (2020–2026): René Verhée
- Area^{1}: 3.5 km^{2} (1.4 sq mi)
- Elevation: 195 m (640 ft)
- Highest elevation: 227 m (745 ft)
- Lowest elevation: 187 m (614 ft)
- Population (2023): 102
  - Density: 29/km^{2} (75/sq mi)
- Time zone: UTC+01:00 (CET)
  - Summer (DST): UTC+02:00 (CEST)
- INSEE/Postal code: 57009 /57590
- ^{1} French Land Register data, which excludes lakes, ponds, glaciers > 1 km^{2} (0.386 sq mi or 247 acres) and river estuaries.

Ajoncourt (French pronunciation: [aʒɔ̃kuʁ]; German: Analdshofen) is a commune in the Moselle department in Grand Est in northeastern France.

== Population ==
Historical population
Year	Pop.	±% p.a.
1968	114	—
1975	100	−1.85%
1982	101	+0.14%
1990	100	−0.12%
1999	91	−1.04%
2007	105	+1.80%
2012	86	−3.91%
2017	103	+3.67%
2023	102	−0.16%
Source: INSEE

== See also ==
- Communes of the Moselle department
