= Haboudange =

- Commune
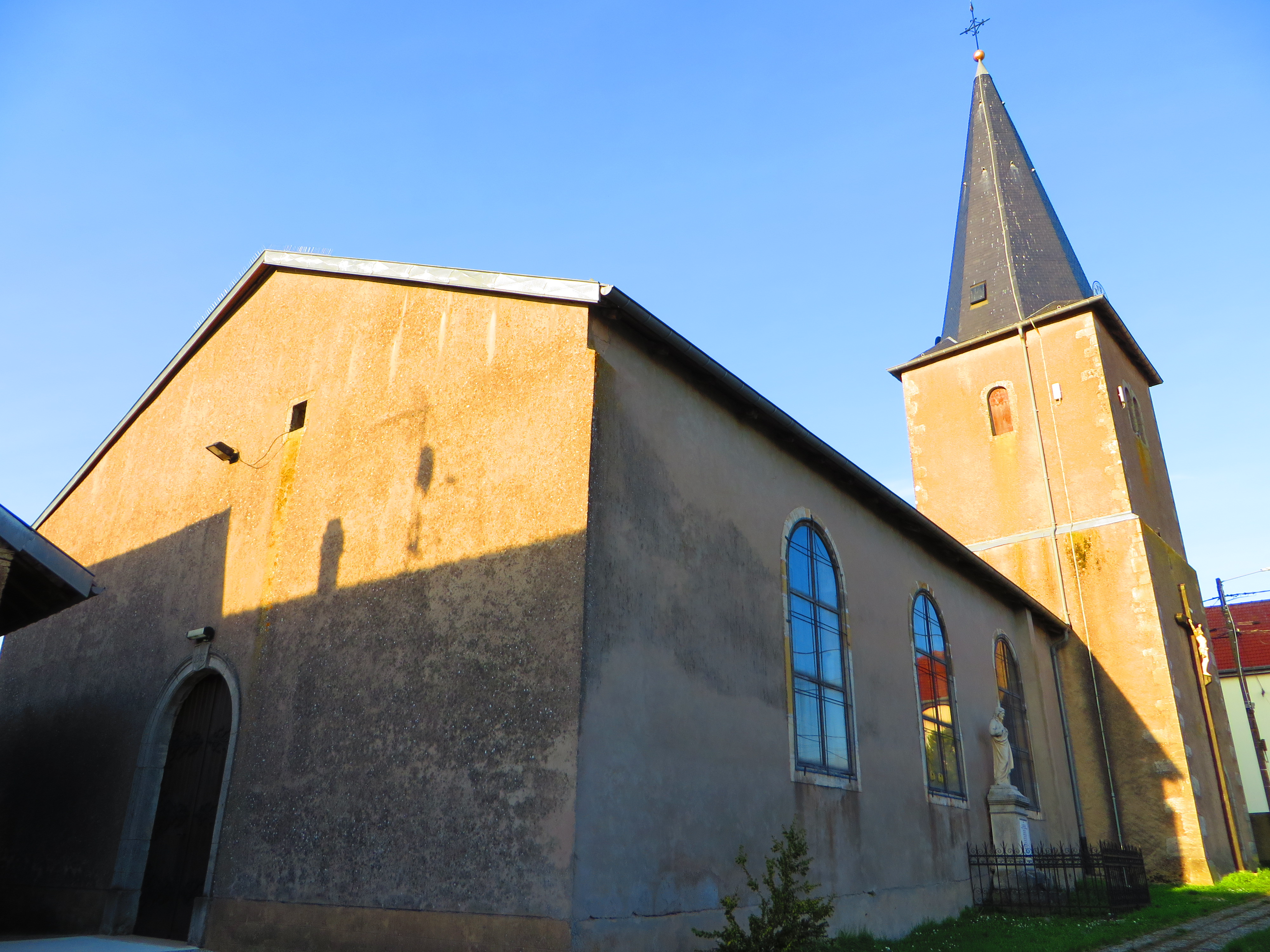
- The church in Haboudange

- Coat of arms
- Location of Haboudange
- Location within France Location within Grand Est
- Coordinates: 48°53′29″N 6°36′46″E
- Country: France
- Region: Grand Est
- Department: Moselle
- Arrondissement: Sarrebourg-Château-Salins
- Canton: Le Saulnois
- Intercommunality: Saulnois

Government
  - Mayor (2020–2026): Pierre Canteneur
- Area^{1}: 10.5 km^{2} (4.1 sq mi)
- Elevation: 303 m (994 ft)
- Highest elevation: 305 m (1,001 ft)
- Lowest elevation: 210 m (690 ft)
- Population (2023): 225
  - Density: 21.4/km^{2} (55.5/sq mi)
- Time zone: UTC+01:00 (CET)
  - Summer (DST): UTC+02:00 (CEST)
- INSEE/Postal code: 57281 /57340
- ^{1} French Land Register data, which excludes lakes, ponds, glaciers > 1 km^{2} (0.386 sq mi or 247 acres) and river estuaries.

Haboudange (French pronunciation: [abudɑ̃ʒ]; German: Habudingen) is a commune in the Moselle department in Grand Est in north-eastern France.

== Population ==
Historical population
Year	Pop.	±% p.a.
1968	219	—
1975	202	−1.15%
1982	224	+1.49%
1990	224	+0.00%
1999	239	+0.72%
2007	265	+1.30%
2012	295	+2.17%
2017	267	−1.97%
2023	225	−2.81%
Source: INSEE

== See also ==
- Communes of the Moselle department
