= Burlioncourt =

- Commune
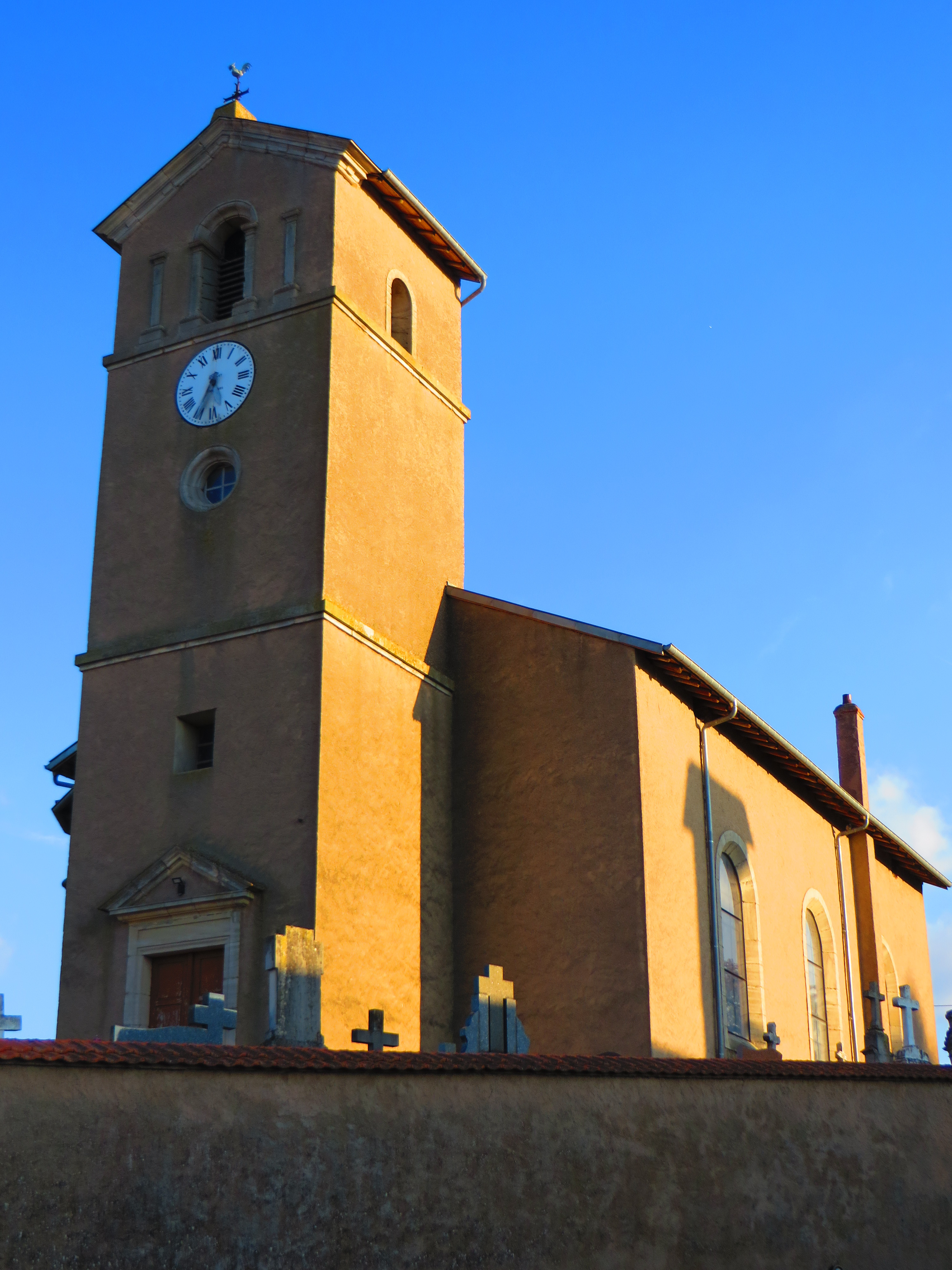
- The church in Burlioncourt

- Coat of arms
- Location of Burlioncourt
- Location within France Location within Grand Est
- Coordinates: 48°51′41″N 6°34′48″E
- Country: France
- Region: Grand Est
- Department: Moselle
- Arrondissement: Sarrebourg-Château-Salins
- Canton: Le Saulnois
- Intercommunality: CC Saulnois

Government
  - Mayor (2020–2026): François Ricatte
- Area^{1}: 7.36 km^{2} (2.84 sq mi)
- Elevation: 210 m (690 ft)
- Highest elevation: 307 m (1,007 ft)
- Lowest elevation: 207 m (679 ft)
- Population (2023): 130
  - Density: 18/km^{2} (46/sq mi)
- Time zone: UTC+01:00 (CET)
  - Summer (DST): UTC+02:00 (CEST)
- INSEE/Postal code: 57120 /57170
- ^{1} French Land Register data, which excludes lakes, ponds, glaciers > 1 km^{2} (0.386 sq mi or 247 acres) and river estuaries.

Burlioncourt (French pronunciation: [byʁljɔ̃kuʁ]; German: Burlingshofen) is a commune in the Moselle department in Grand Est in northeastern France.

== Population ==
Historical population
Year	Pop.	±% p.a.
1968	171	—
1975	159	−1.03%
1982	180	+1.79%
1990	162	−1.31%
1999	181	+1.24%
2007	177	−0.28%
2012	165	−1.39%
2017	138	−3.51%
2023	130	−0.99%
Source: INSEE

== See also ==
- Communes of the Moselle department
