= Grémecey =

- Commune
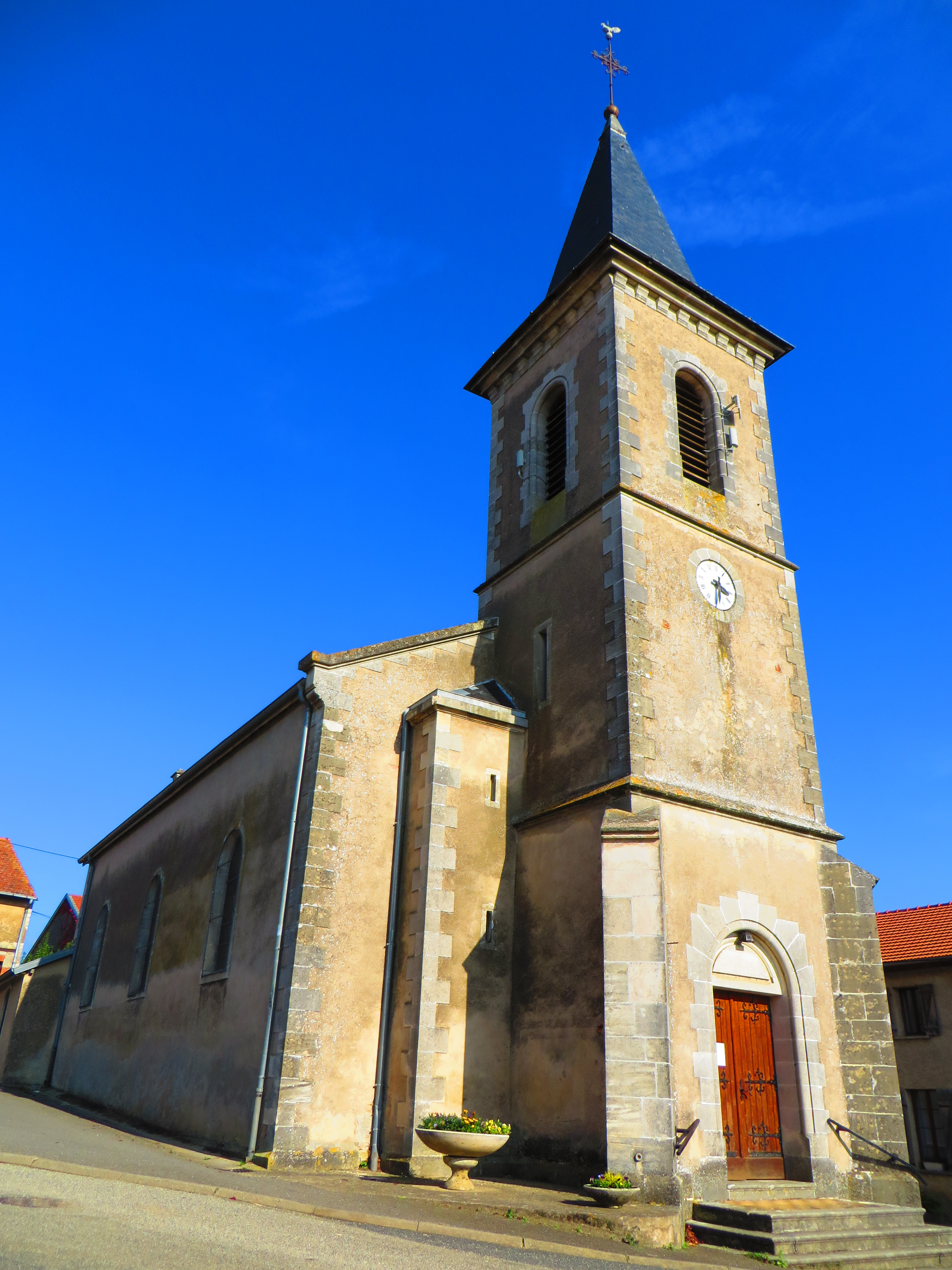
- The church in Grémecey

- Coat of arms
- Location of Grémecey
- Location within France Location within Grand Est
- Coordinates: 48°48′03″N 6°24′22″E
- Country: France
- Region: Grand Est
- Department: Moselle
- Arrondissement: Sarrebourg-Château-Salins
- Canton: Le Saulnois
- Intercommunality: CC du Saulnois

Government
  - Mayor (2022–2026): Guy L'Huillier
- Area^{1}: 9.04 km^{2} (3.49 sq mi)
- Elevation: 220 m (720 ft)
- Highest elevation: 313 m (1,027 ft)
- Lowest elevation: 205 m (673 ft)
- Population (2023): 100
  - Density: 11/km^{2} (29/sq mi)
- Time zone: UTC+01:00 (CET)
  - Summer (DST): UTC+02:00 (CEST)
- INSEE/Postal code: 57257 /57170
- ^{1} French Land Register data, which excludes lakes, ponds, glaciers > 1 km^{2} (0.386 sq mi or 247 acres) and river estuaries.

Grémecey (French pronunciation: [ɡʁemsɛ]; German: Gremsich) is a commune in the Moselle department in Grand Est in north-eastern France.

== See also ==
- Communes of the Moselle department
