= Lesse, Moselle =

Lesse
- Commune
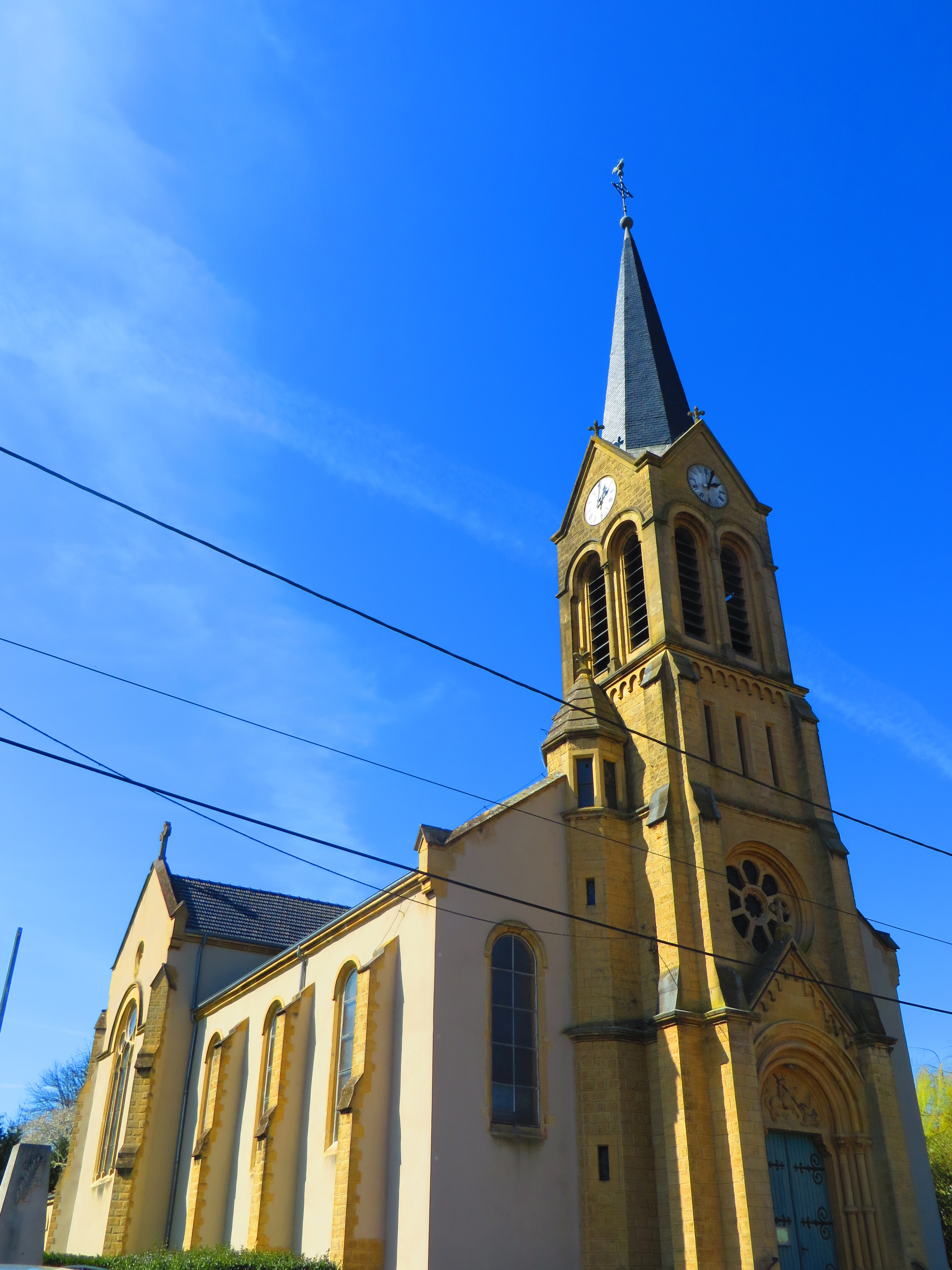
- The church in Lesse

- Coat of arms
- Location of Lesse
- Location within France Location within Grand Est
- Coordinates: 48°57′51″N 6°30′19″E
- Country: France
- Region: Grand Est
- Department: Moselle
- Arrondissement: Sarrebourg-Château-Salins
- Canton: Le Saulnois
- Intercommunality: CC du Saulnois

Government
  - Mayor (2020–2026): Benoît Tiaphat
- Area^{1}: 8.44 km^{2} (3.26 sq mi)
- Population (2023): 206
  - Density: 24.4/km^{2} (63.2/sq mi)
- Time zone: UTC+01:00 (CET)
  - Summer (DST): UTC+02:00 (CEST)
- INSEE/Postal code: 57395 /57580
- ^{1} French Land Register data, which excludes lakes, ponds, glaciers > 1 km^{2} (0.386 sq mi or 247 acres) and river estuaries.

Lesse (French pronunciation: [lɛs]; German: Lesch) is a commune in the Moselle department in Grand Est in north-eastern France.

== See also ==
- Communes of the Moselle department
