= Francaltroff =

- Commune
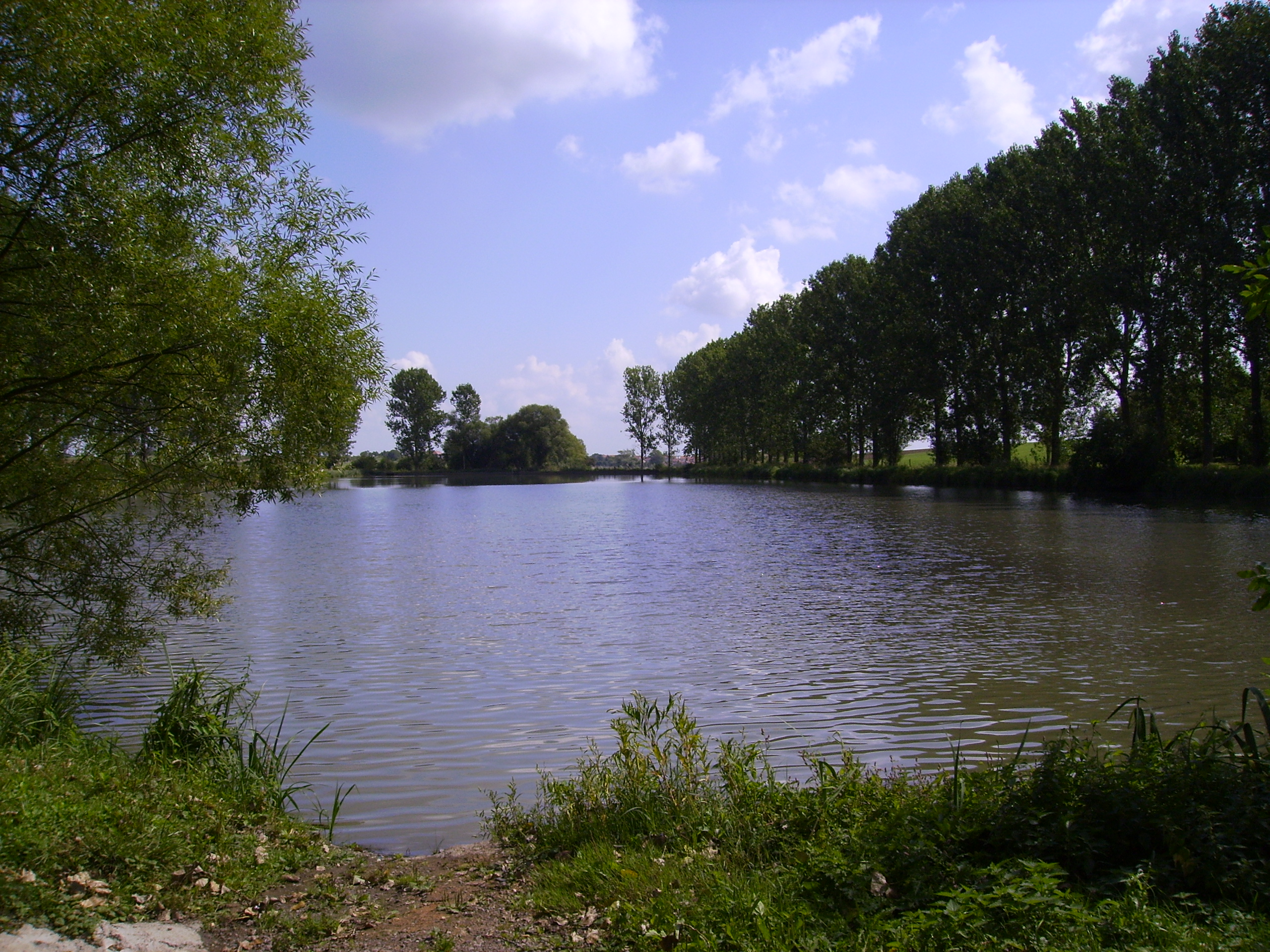
- The lake of La Tensch

- Coat of arms
- Location of Francaltroff
- Location within France Location within Grand Est
- Coordinates: 48°57′48″N 6°47′53″E
- Country: France
- Region: Grand Est
- Department: Moselle
- Arrondissement: Sarrebourg-Château-Salins
- Canton: Le Saulnois
- Intercommunality: CC du Saulnois

Government
  - Mayor (2020–2026): Daniel Cufer
- Area^{1}: 12.46 km^{2} (4.81 sq mi)
- Elevation: 220 m (720 ft)
- Highest elevation: 289 m (948 ft)
- Lowest elevation: 217 m (712 ft)
- Population (2023): 750
  - Density: 60/km^{2} (160/sq mi)
- Time zone: UTC+01:00 (CET)
  - Summer (DST): UTC+02:00 (CEST)
- INSEE/Postal code: 57232 /57670
- ^{1} French Land Register data, which excludes lakes, ponds, glaciers > 1 km^{2} (0.386 sq mi or 247 acres) and river estuaries.

Francaltroff (French pronunciation: [fʁɑ̃kaltʁɔf]; German: Freialtdorf) is a commune in the Moselle department in Grand Est in north-eastern France.

== See also ==
- Communes of the Moselle department
