= Fossieux =

- Commune
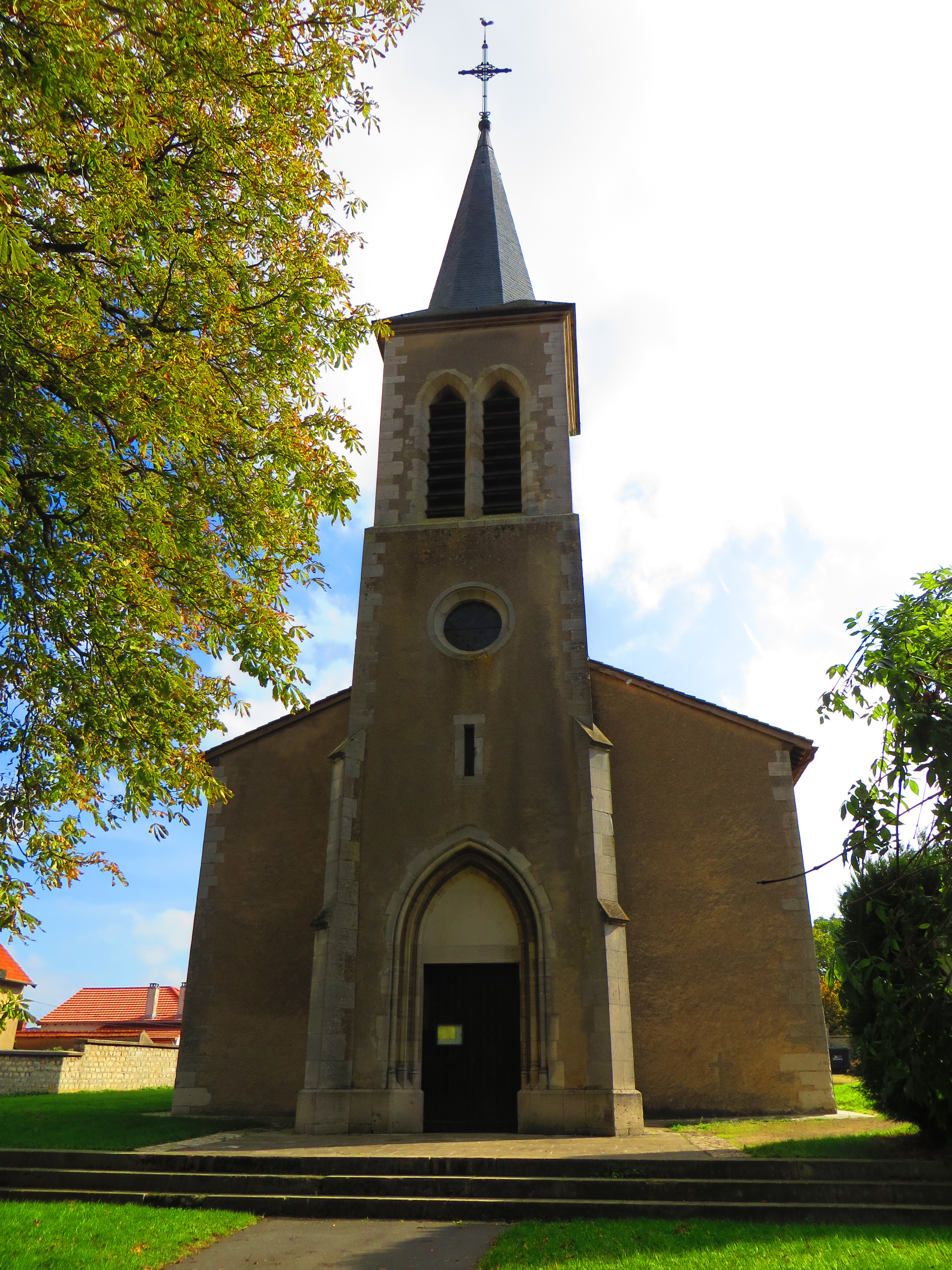
- The church in Fossieux

- Coat of arms
- Location of Fossieux
- Location within France Location within Grand Est
- Coordinates: 48°51′08″N 6°19′36″E
- Country: France
- Region: Grand Est
- Department: Moselle
- Arrondissement: Sarrebourg-Château-Salins
- Canton: Le Saulnois
- Intercommunality: CC du Saulnois

Government
  - Mayor (2020–2026): Thérèse Dieudonne
- Area^{1}: 5.06 km^{2} (1.95 sq mi)
- Elevation: 400 m (1,300 ft)
- Highest elevation: 258 m (846 ft)
- Lowest elevation: 189 m (620 ft)
- Population (2023): 186
  - Density: 36.8/km^{2} (95.2/sq mi)
- Time zone: UTC+01:00 (CET)
  - Summer (DST): UTC+02:00 (CEST)
- INSEE/Postal code: 57228 /57590
- ^{1} French Land Register data, which excludes lakes, ponds, glaciers > 1 km^{2} (0.386 sq mi or 247 acres) and river estuaries.

Fossieux (French pronunciation: [fɔsjø]; German: Fossingen) is a commune in the Moselle department in Grand Est in north-eastern France.

== See also ==
- Communes of the Moselle department
