= Pettoncourt =

- Commune
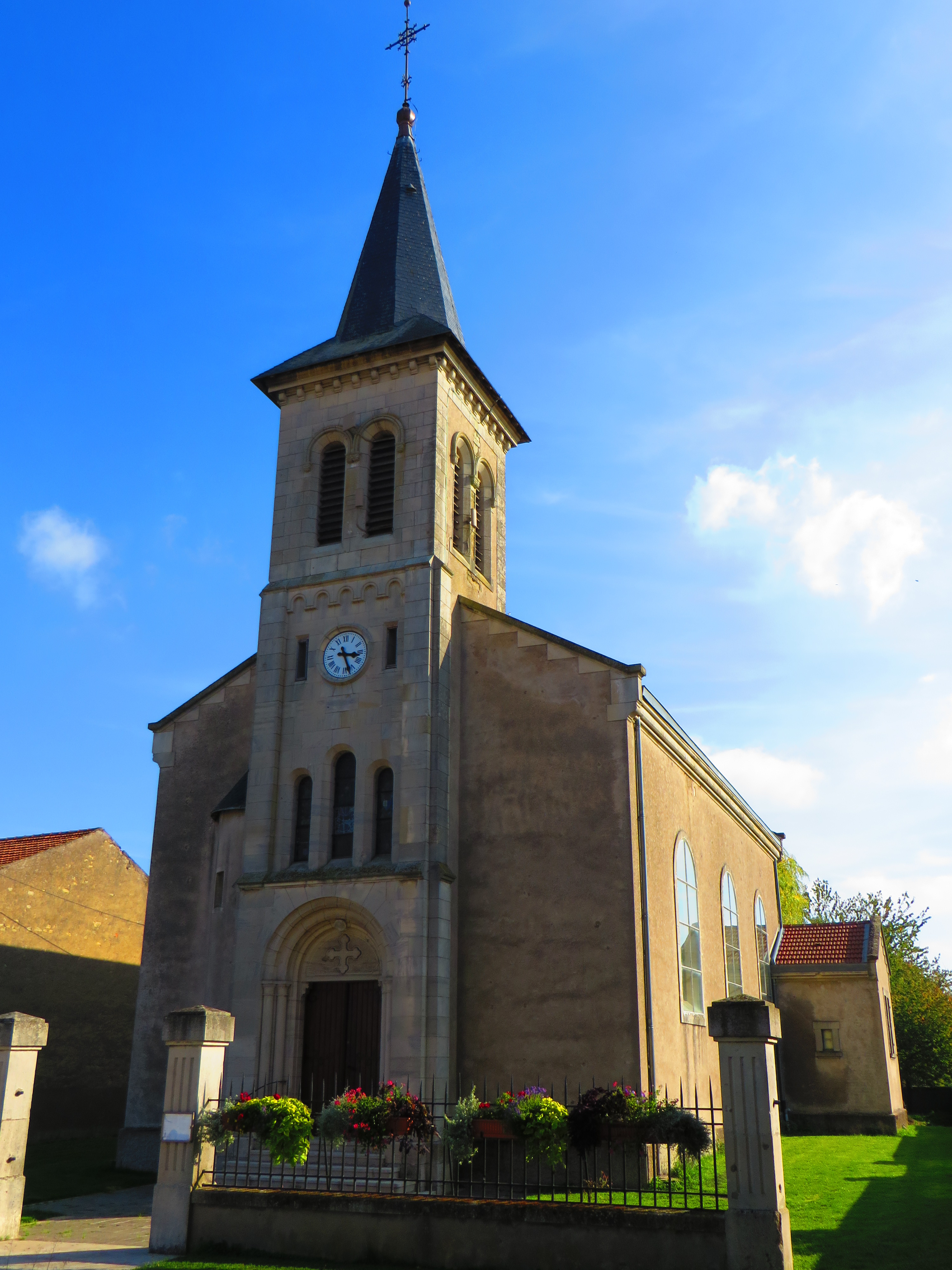
- The church in Pettoncourt

- Coat of arms
- Location of Pettoncourt
- Location within France Location within Grand Est
- Coordinates: 48°46′56″N 6°24′20″E
- Country: France
- Region: Grand Est
- Department: Moselle
- Arrondissement: Sarrebourg-Château-Salins
- Canton: Le Saulnois
- Intercommunality: CC du Saulnois

Government
  - Mayor (2020–2026): Marie-Claude Tosi
- Area^{1}: 4.9 km^{2} (1.9 sq mi)
- Elevation: 205 m (673 ft)
- Highest elevation: 282 m (925 ft)
- Lowest elevation: 197 m (646 ft)
- Population (2023): 296
  - Density: 60/km^{2} (160/sq mi)
- Time zone: UTC+01:00 (CET)
  - Summer (DST): UTC+02:00 (CEST)
- INSEE/Postal code: 57538 /57170
- ^{1} French Land Register data, which excludes lakes, ponds, glaciers > 1 km^{2} (0.386 sq mi or 247 acres) and river estuaries.

Pettoncourt (French pronunciation: [pɛtɔ̃kuʁ]; German: Pettenhofen) is a commune in the Moselle department in Grand Est in north-eastern France.

== See also ==
- Communes of the Moselle department
