= Lubécourt =

- Commune
- Coat of arms
- Location of Lubécourt
- Location within France Location within Grand Est
- Coordinates: 48°50′35″N 6°30′59″E
- Country: France
- Region: Grand Est
- Department: Moselle
- Arrondissement: Sarrebourg-Château-Salins
- Canton: Le Saulnois
- Intercommunality: CC du Saulnois

Government
  - Mayor (2020–2026): André Toussaint
- Area^{1}: 3.45 km^{2} (1.33 sq mi)
- Elevation: 162 m (531 ft)
- Highest elevation: 358 m (1,175 ft)
- Lowest elevation: 203 m (666 ft)
- Population (2023): 66
  - Density: 19/km^{2} (50/sq mi)
- Time zone: UTC+01:00 (CET)
  - Summer (DST): UTC+02:00 (CEST)
- INSEE/Postal code: 57423 /57170
- ^{1} French Land Register data, which excludes lakes, ponds, glaciers > 1 km^{2} (0.386 sq mi or 247 acres) and river estuaries.

Lubécourt (French pronunciation: [lybekuʁ]; German: Lubenhofen) is a commune in the Moselle department in Grand Est in north-eastern France.

== See also ==
- Communes of the Moselle department
