= Communauté de communes du Saulnois =

Federation of municipalities in France

Saulnois
- Communauté de communes
- Interactive map of Saulnois
- Coordinates: 48°49′N 6°30′E
- Country: France
- Region: Grand Est
- Department: Moselle
- No. of communes: {{{nbcomm}}}
- Established: 1998
- Area: 974.4 km^{2} (376.2 sq mi)
- Population (2018): 28,853
  - Density: 29.61/km^{2} (76.69/sq mi)

The Communauté de communes du Saulnois (Community of communes of Saulnois) is a federation of municipalities of the rural Saulnois region, located in the department of Moselle in Eastern France. It consists of 128 communes. Its seat is in Château-Salins. Its area is 974.4 km^{2}, and its population was 28,853 in 2018.

== Composition ==
The communauté de communes consists of the following 128 communes:

1. Aboncourt-sur-Seille
2. Achain
3. Ajoncourt
4. Alaincourt-la-Côte
5. Albestroff
6. Amelécourt
7. Attilloncourt
8. Aulnois-sur-Seille
9. Bacourt
10. Bassing
11. Baudrecourt
12. Bellange
13. Bénestroff
14. Bermering
15. Bezange-la-Petite
16. Bidestroff
17. Bioncourt
18. Blanche-Église
19. Bourdonnay
20. Bourgaltroff
21. Bréhain
22. Burlioncourt
23. Chambrey
24. Château-Bréhain
25. Château-Salins
26. Château-Voué
27. Chenois
28. Chicourt
29. Conthil
30. Craincourt
31. Cutting
32. Dalhain
33. Delme
34. Dieuze
35. Domnom-lès-Dieuze
36. Donjeux
37. Donnelay
38. Fonteny
39. Fossieux
40. Francaltroff
41. Frémery
42. Fresnes-en-Saulnois
43. Gelucourt
44. Gerbécourt
45. Givrycourt
46. Grémecey
47. Guébestroff
48. Guéblange-lès-Dieuze
49. Guébling
50. Guinzeling
51. Haboudange
52. Hampont
53. Hannocourt
54. Haraucourt-sur-Seille
55. Honskirch
56. Insming
57. Insviller
58. Jallaucourt
59. Juvelize
60. Juville
61. Lagarde
62. Laneuveville-en-Saulnois
63. Lemoncourt
64. Léning
65. Lesse
66. Ley
67. Lezey
68. Lhor
69. Lidrezing
70. Lindre-Basse
71. Lindre-Haute
72. Liocourt
73. Lostroff
74. Loudrefing
75. Lubécourt
76. Lucy
77. Maizières-lès-Vic
78. Malaucourt-sur-Seille
79. Manhoué
80. Marimont-lès-Bénestroff
81. Marsal
82. Marthille
83. Molring
84. Moncourt
85. Montdidier
86. Morville-lès-Vic
87. Morville-sur-Nied
88. Moyenvic
89. Mulcey
90. Munster
91. Nébing
92. Neufvillage
93. Obreck
94. Ommeray
95. Oriocourt
96. Oron
97. Pettoncourt
98. Pévange
99. Prévocourt
100. Puttigny
101. Puzieux
102. Réning
103. Riche
104. Rodalbe
105. Rorbach-lès-Dieuze
106. Saint-Epvre
107. Saint-Médard
108. Salonnes
109. Sotzeling
110. Tarquimpol
111. Tincry
112. Torcheville
113. Vahl-lès-Bénestroff
114. Val-de-Bride
115. Vannecourt
116. Vaxy
117. Vergaville
118. Vibersviller
119. Vic-sur-Seille
120. Villers-sur-Nied
121. Virming
122. Vittersbourg
123. Viviers
124. Wuisse
125. Xanrey
126. Xocourt
127. Zarbeling
128. Zommange
