= Riche =

- Commune
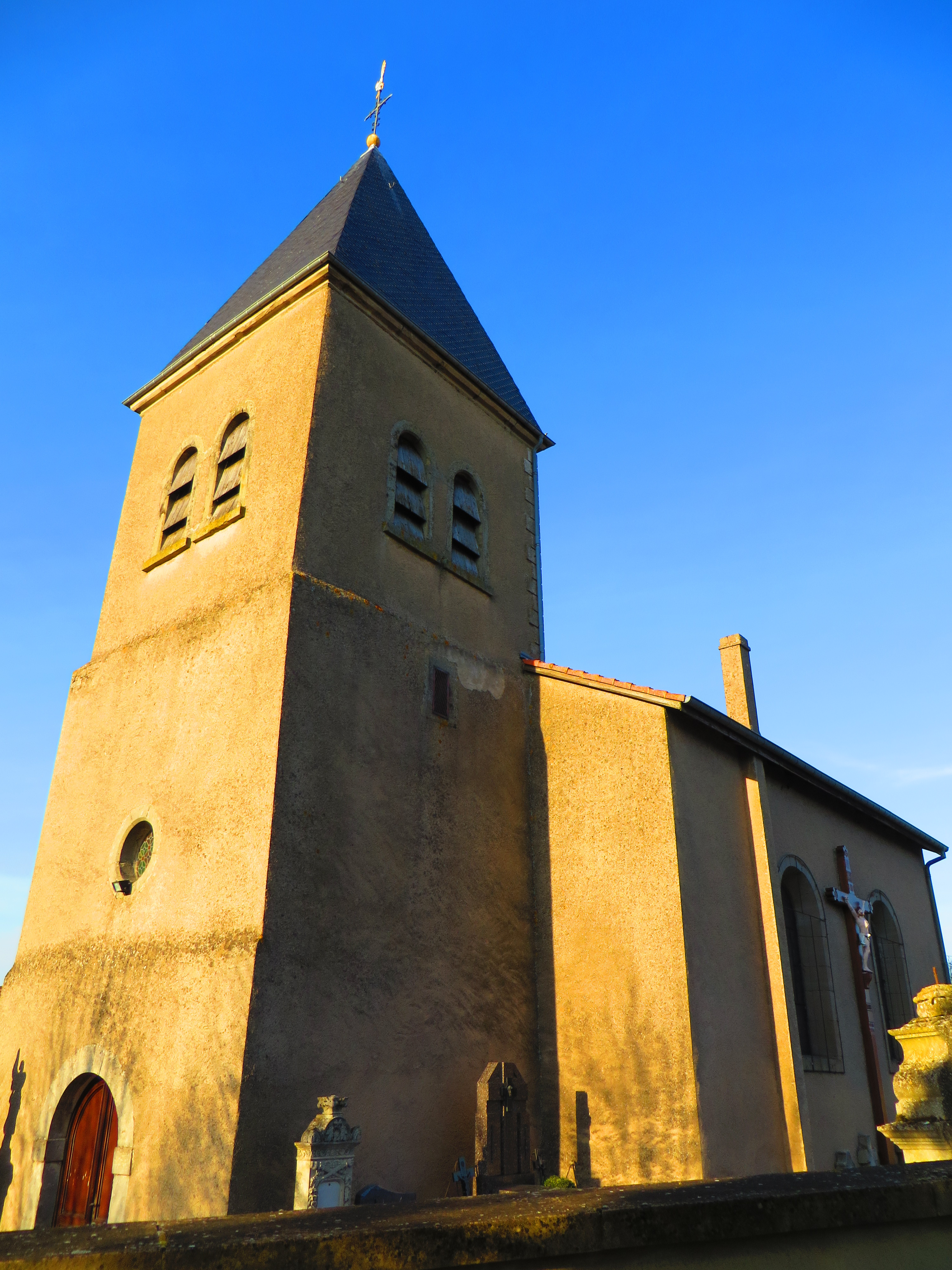
- The church in Riche

- Coat of arms
- Location of Riche
- Location within France Location within Grand Est
- Coordinates: 48°53′30″N 6°37′43″E
- Country: France
- Region: Grand Est
- Department: Moselle
- Arrondissement: Sarrebourg-Château-Salins
- Canton: Le Saulnois
- Intercommunality: CC Saulnois

Government
  - Mayor (2020–2026): Robert Forêt
- Area^{1}: 6.34 km^{2} (2.45 sq mi)
- Elevation: 260 m (850 ft)
- Highest elevation: 270 m (890 ft)
- Lowest elevation: 213 m (699 ft)
- Population (2023): 180
  - Density: 28/km^{2} (74/sq mi)
- Time zone: UTC+01:00 (CET)
  - Summer (DST): UTC+02:00 (CEST)
- INSEE/Postal code: 57580 /57340
- ^{1} French Land Register data, which excludes lakes, ponds, glaciers > 1 km^{2} (0.386 sq mi or 247 acres) and river estuaries.

Riche (French pronunciation: [ʁiʃ]; German: Reich) is a commune in the Moselle department in Grand Est in north-eastern France

== See also ==
- Communes of the Moselle department
