= Vigny =

Vigny may refer:

- Vigny, Moselle, a commune in the Moselle department
- Vigny, Val-d'Oise, a commune in the Val-d'Oise department
- Alfred de Vigny (1797-1863), French writer
