= Gelucourt =

- Commune
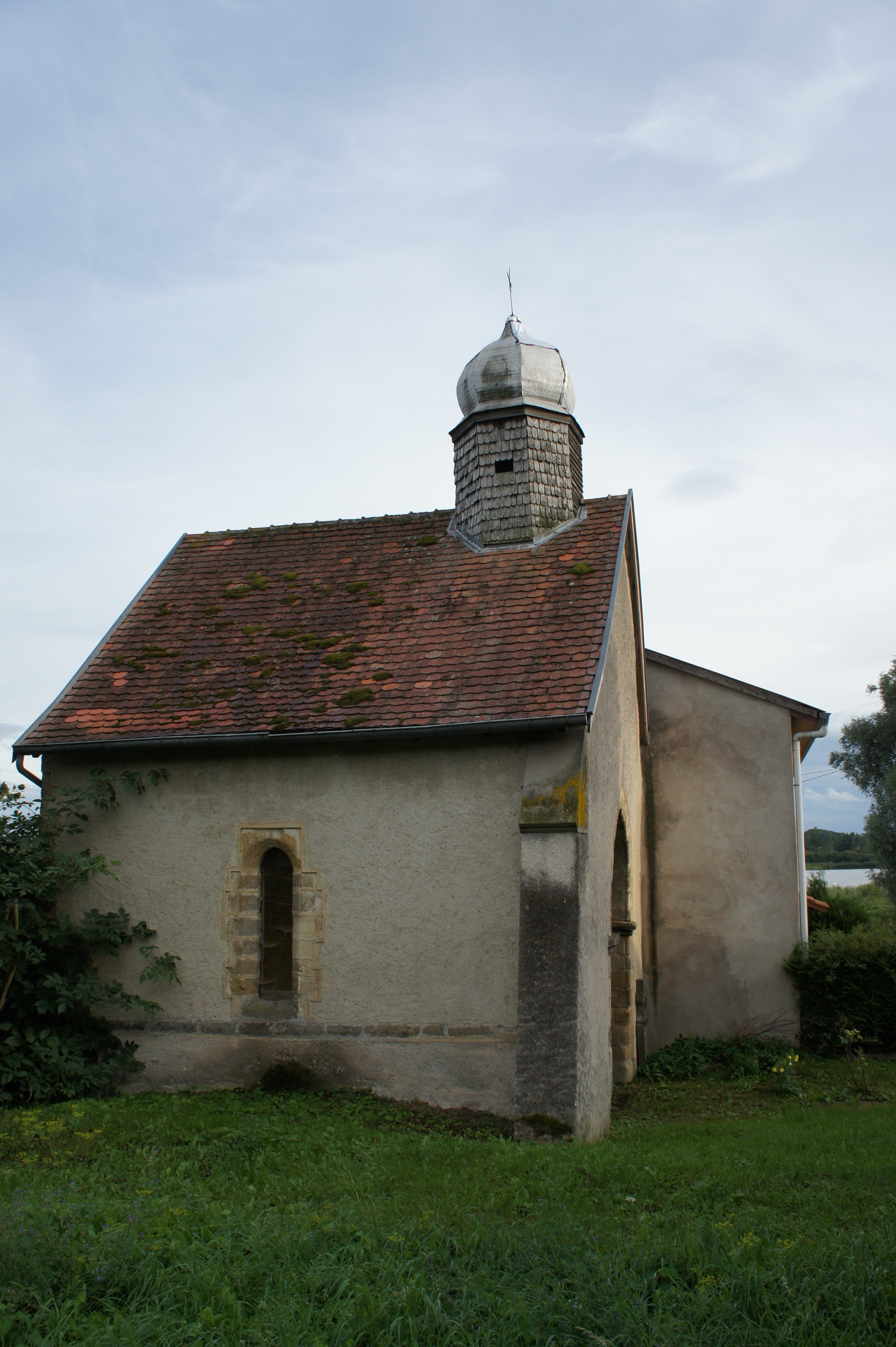
- The chapel in Gelucourt

- Coat of arms
- Location of Gelucourt
- Location within France Location within Grand Est
- Coordinates: 48°45′55″N 6°43′38″E
- Country: France
- Region: Grand Est
- Department: Moselle
- Arrondissement: Sarrebourg-Château-Salins
- Canton: Le Saulnois
- Intercommunality: CC du Saulnois

Government
  - Mayor (2020–2026): Jean-Louis Veveurt
- Area^{1}: 12.34 km^{2} (4.76 sq mi)
- Elevation: 208 m (682 ft)
- Highest elevation: 256 m (840 ft)
- Lowest elevation: 207 m (679 ft)
- Population (2023): 204
  - Density: 16.5/km^{2} (42.8/sq mi)
- Time zone: UTC+01:00 (CET)
  - Summer (DST): UTC+02:00 (CEST)
- INSEE/Postal code: 57246 /57260
- ^{1} French Land Register data, which excludes lakes, ponds, glaciers > 1 km^{2} (0.386 sq mi or 247 acres) and river estuaries.

Gelucourt (French pronunciation: [ʒəlykuʁ]; German: Gisselfingen) is a commune in the Moselle department in Grand Est in north-eastern France.

== See also ==
- Communes of the Moselle department
- Parc naturel régional de Lorraine
