= Marthille =

- Commune
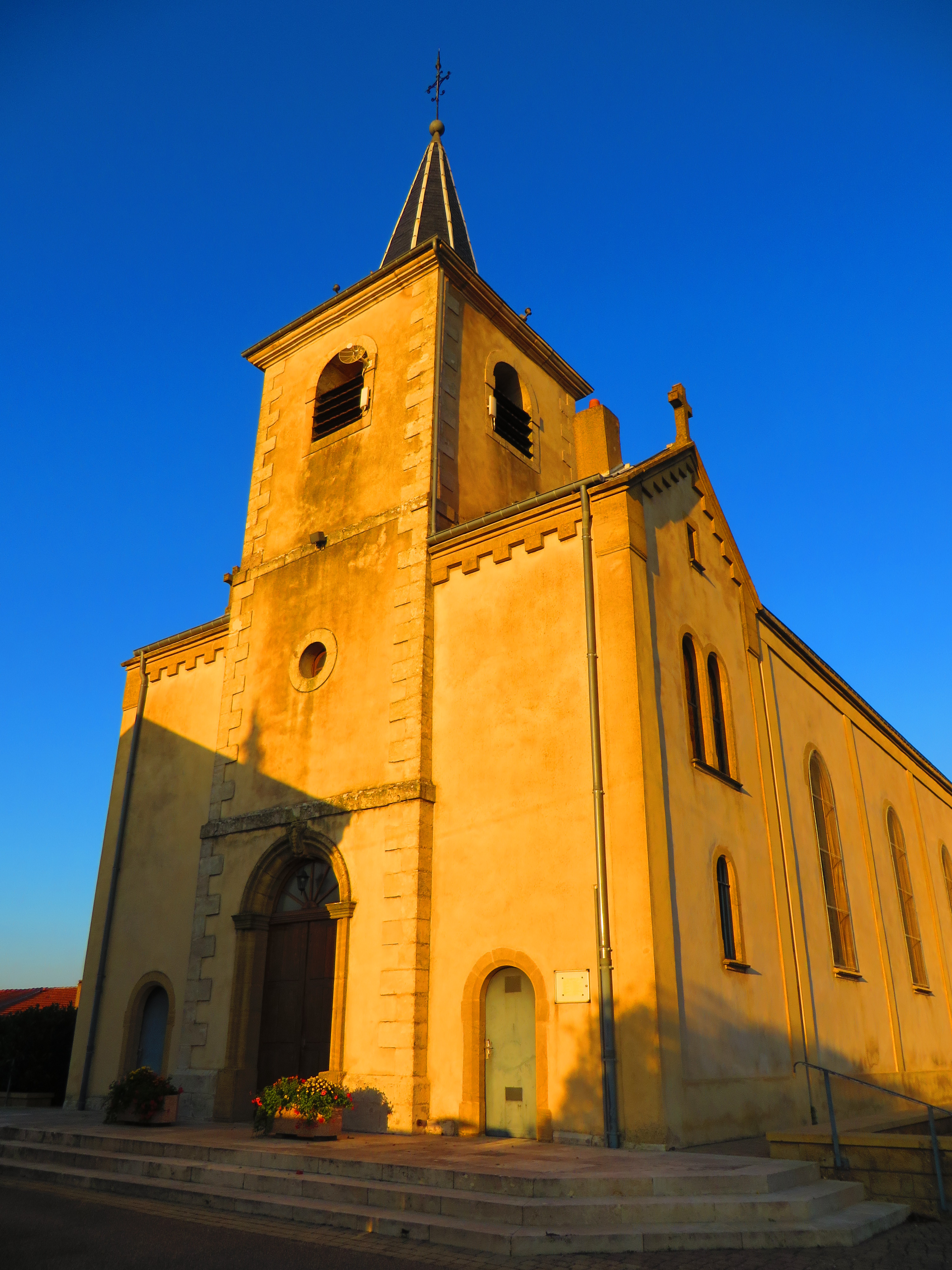
- The church in Marthille

- Coat of arms
- Location of Marthille
- Location within France Location within Grand Est
- Coordinates: 48°55′31″N 6°33′38″E
- Country: France
- Region: Grand Est
- Department: Moselle
- Arrondissement: Sarrebourg-Château-Salins
- Canton: Le Saulnois
- Intercommunality: CC du Saulnois

Government
  - Mayor (2020–2026): Gérard Hieronimus
- Area^{1}: 10.2 km^{2} (3.9 sq mi)
- Highest elevation: 359 m (1,178 ft)
- Lowest elevation: 249 m (817 ft)
- Population (2023): 167
  - Density: 16.4/km^{2} (42.4/sq mi)
- Time zone: UTC+01:00 (CET)
  - Summer (DST): UTC+02:00 (CEST)
- INSEE/Postal code: 57451 /57340
- ^{1} French Land Register data, which excludes lakes, ponds, glaciers > 1 km^{2} (0.386 sq mi or 247 acres) and river estuaries.

Marthille (French pronunciation: [maʁtij]; German: Marten) is a commune in the Moselle department in Grand Est in north-eastern France.

== See also ==
- Communes of the Moselle department
