= Aboncourt-sur-Seille =

- Commune
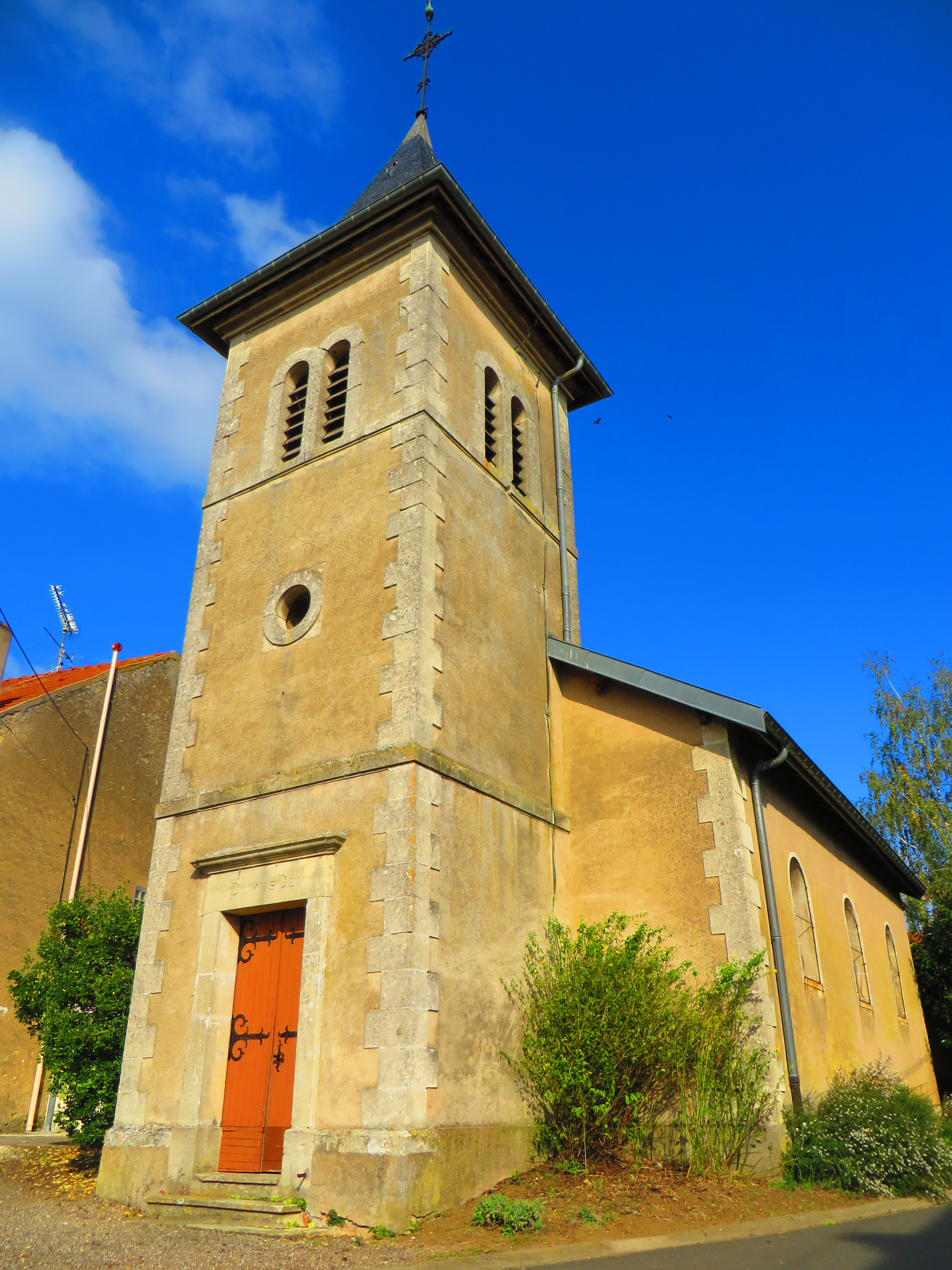
- The church in Aboncourt-sur-Seille

- Coat of arms
- Location of Aboncourt-sur-Seille
- Location within France Location within Grand Est
- Coordinates: 48°49′02″N 6°20′25″E
- Country: France
- Region: Grand Est
- Department: Moselle
- Arrondissement: Sarrebourg-Château-Salins
- Canton: Le Saulnois
- Intercommunality: Saulnois

Government
  - Mayor (2020–2026): Fabrice Bagnon
- Area^{1}: 3.63 km^{2} (1.40 sq mi)
- Elevation: 312 m (1,024 ft)
- Highest elevation: 290 m (950 ft)
- Lowest elevation: 195 m (640 ft)
- Population (2023): 67
  - Density: 18/km^{2} (48/sq mi)
- Demonym(s): Aboncourtois, Aboncourtoises
- Time zone: UTC+01:00 (CET)
  - Summer (DST): UTC+02:00 (CEST)
- INSEE/Postal code: 57002 /57590
- ^{1} French Land Register data, which excludes lakes, ponds, glaciers > 1 km^{2} (0.386 sq mi or 247 acres) and river estuaries.

Aboncourt-sur-Seille (French pronunciation: [abɔ̃kuʁ syʁ sɛj], literally Aboncourt on Seille; German: Abenhofen) is a commune in the Moselle department in Grand Est in northeastern France.

== Population ==
Historical population

Year	Pop.	±% p.a.
1793	124	—
1821	140	+0.43%
1846	175	+0.90%
1871	151	−0.59%
1900	101	−1.38%
1926	61	−1.92%
1946	47	−1.30%
1962	61	+1.64%
1968	53	−2.32%

Year	Pop.	±% p.a.
1975	54	+0.27%
1982	66	+2.91%
1990	55	−2.25%
1999	64	+1.70%
2007	70	+1.13%
2012	73	+0.84%
2017	72	−0.28%
2023	67	−1.19%

Source: EHESS (1793-1999) and INSEE

== See also ==
- Communes of the Moselle department
