= Lucy, Moselle =

Administrative division in Grand Est, France

Lucy
- Commune
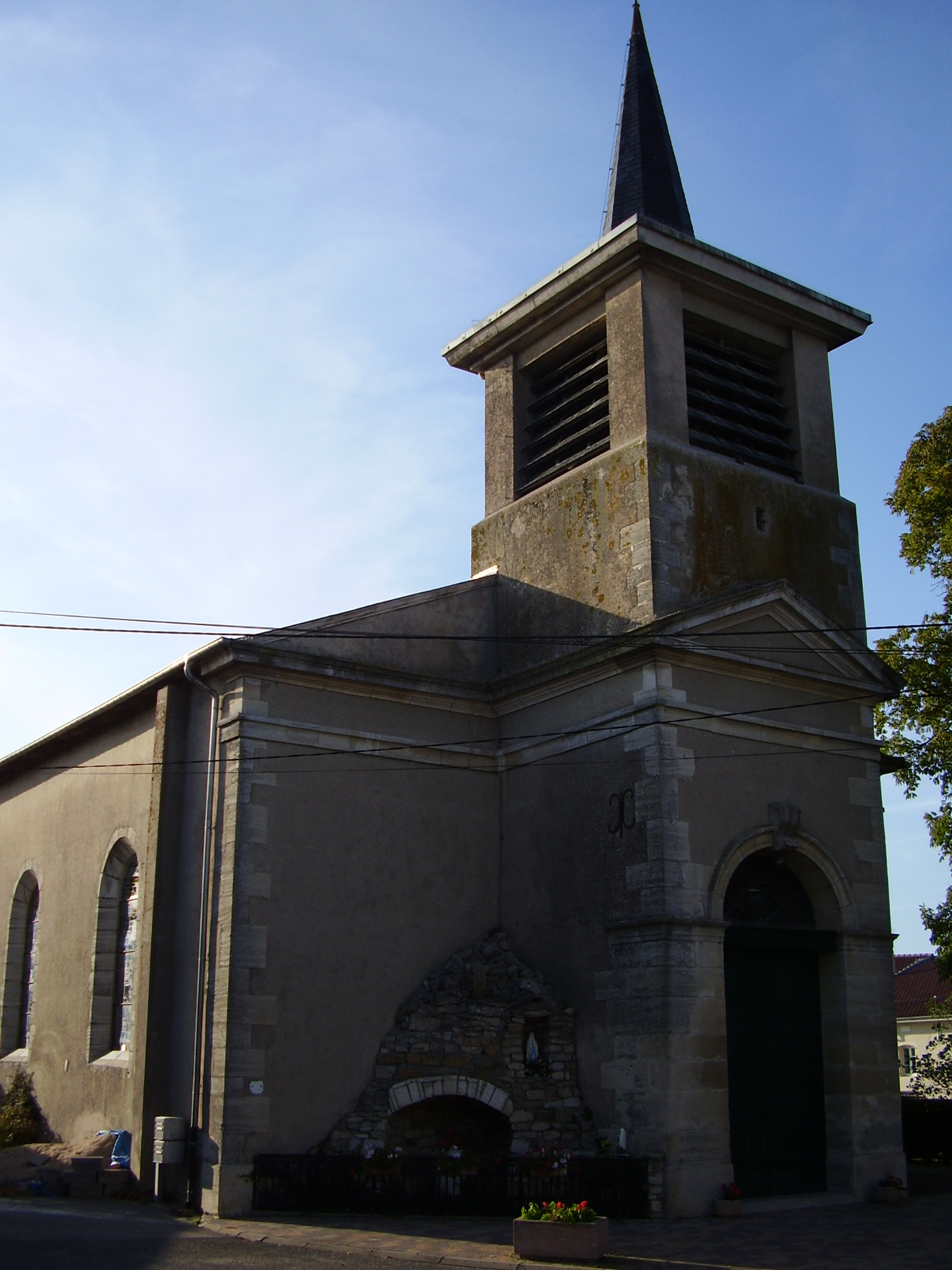
- The church in Lucy

- Coat of arms
- Location of Lucy
- Location within France Location within Grand Est
- Coordinates: 48°56′33″N 6°28′15″E
- Country: France
- Region: Grand Est
- Department: Moselle
- Arrondissement: Sarrebourg-Château-Salins
- Canton: Le Saulnois
- Intercommunality: CC du Saulnois

Government
  - Mayor (2021–2026): Joël Pierrard
- Area^{1}: 7.36 km^{2} (2.84 sq mi)
- Elevation: 250 m (820 ft)
- Highest elevation: 315 m (1,033 ft)
- Lowest elevation: 228 m (748 ft)
- Population (2023): 224
  - Density: 30.4/km^{2} (78.8/sq mi)
- Time zone: UTC+01:00 (CET)
  - Summer (DST): UTC+02:00 (CEST)
- INSEE/Postal code: 57424 /57590
- ^{1} French Land Register data, which excludes lakes, ponds, glaciers > 1 km^{2} (0.386 sq mi or 247 acres) and river estuaries.

Lucy (French pronunciation: [lysi]; German: Lixingen bei Delmen) is a commune in the Moselle department in Grand Est in north-eastern France.

== See also ==
- Communes of the Moselle department
