= Vergaville =

- Commune
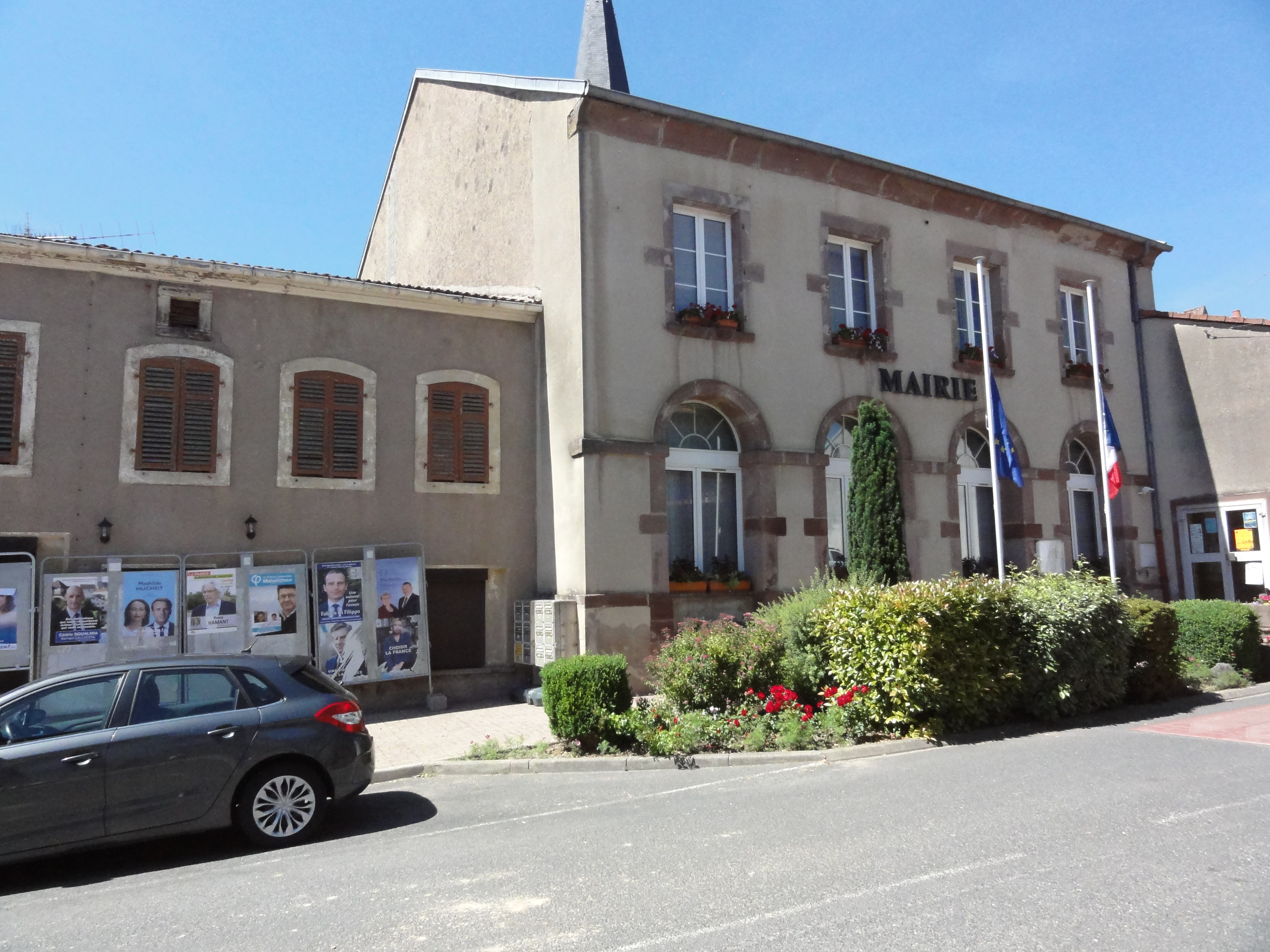
- The town hall in Vergaville

- Coat of arms
- Location of Vergaville
- Location within France Location within Grand Est
- Coordinates: 48°50′16″N 6°44′41″E
- Country: France
- Region: Grand Est
- Department: Moselle
- Arrondissement: Sarrebourg-Château-Salins
- Canton: Le Saulnois
- Intercommunality: CC du Saulnois

Government
  - Mayor (2020–2026): Gérard Beck
- Area^{1}: 13.17 km^{2} (5.08 sq mi)
- Elevation: 280 m (920 ft)
- Highest elevation: 333 m (1,093 ft)
- Lowest elevation: 205 m (673 ft)
- Population (2023): 529
  - Density: 40.2/km^{2} (104/sq mi)
- Time zone: UTC+01:00 (CET)
  - Summer (DST): UTC+02:00 (CEST)
- INSEE/Postal code: 57706 /57260
- ^{1} French Land Register data, which excludes lakes, ponds, glaciers > 1 km^{2} (0.386 sq mi or 247 acres) and river estuaries.

Vergaville (French pronunciation: [vɛʁɡavil]; German: Widersdorf) is a commune in the Moselle department in Grand Est in north-eastern France.

== See also ==
- Communes of the Moselle department
