= Guébestroff =

- Commune
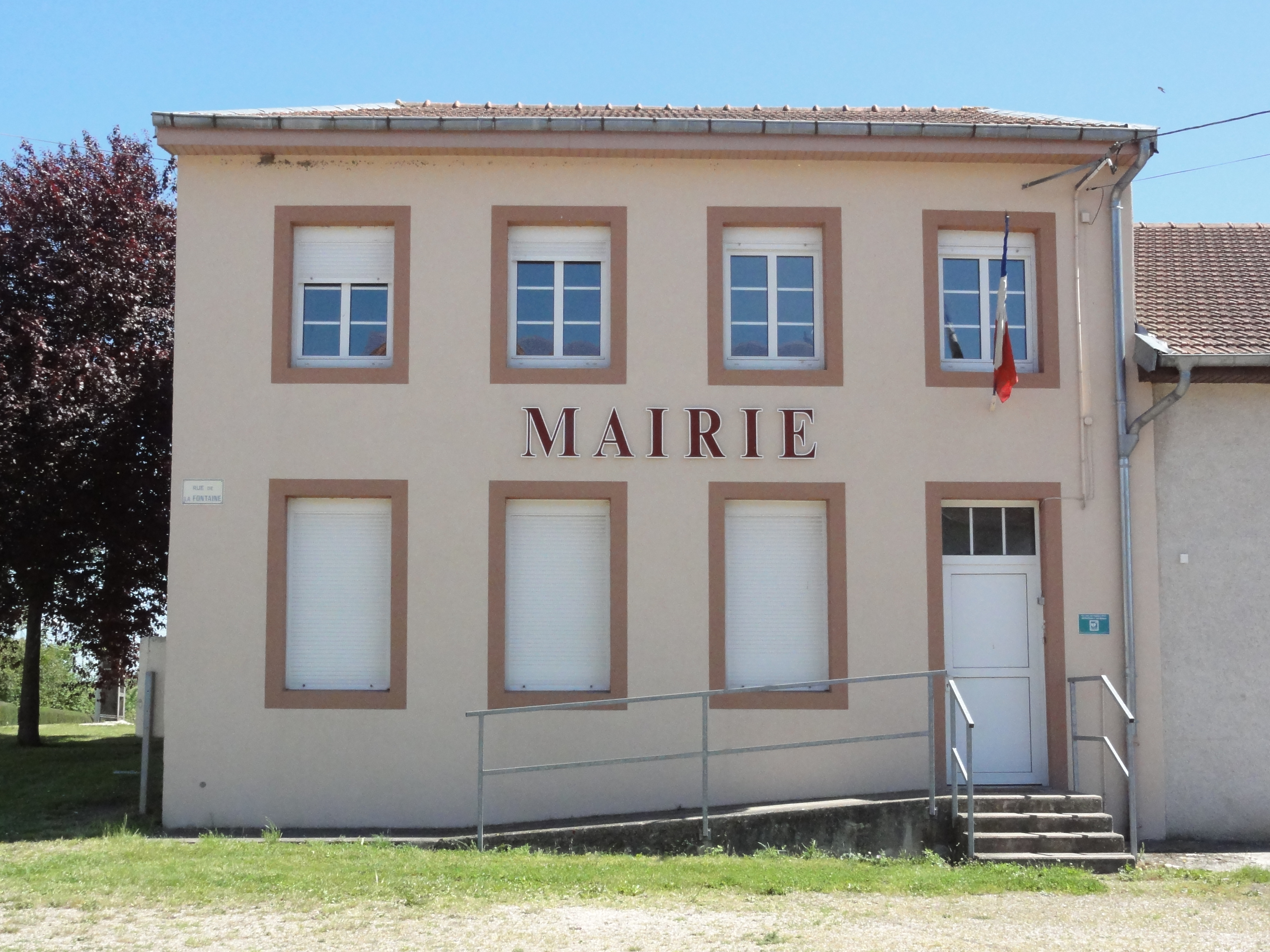
- The town hall in Guébestroff

- Coat of arms
- Location of Guébestroff
- Location within France Location within Grand Est
- Coordinates: 48°49′53″N 6°43′11″E
- Country: France
- Region: Grand Est
- Department: Moselle
- Arrondissement: Sarrebourg-Château-Salins
- Canton: Le Saulnois
- Intercommunality: CC du Saulnois

Government
  - Mayor (2020–2026): Thierry Chateaux
- Area^{1}: 3.81 km^{2} (1.47 sq mi)
- Elevation: 240 m (790 ft)
- Highest elevation: 333 m (1,093 ft)
- Lowest elevation: 209 m (686 ft)
- Population (2023): 58
  - Density: 15/km^{2} (39/sq mi)
- Time zone: UTC+01:00 (CET)
  - Summer (DST): UTC+02:00 (CEST)
- INSEE/Postal code: 57265 /57260
- ^{1} French Land Register data, which excludes lakes, ponds, glaciers > 1 km^{2} (0.386 sq mi or 247 acres) and river estuaries.

Guébestroff (French pronunciation: [ɡebɛstʁɔf]; German: Gebesdorf) is a commune in the Moselle department in Grand Est in north-eastern France.

== See also ==
- Communes of the Moselle department
