= Juville =

- Commune
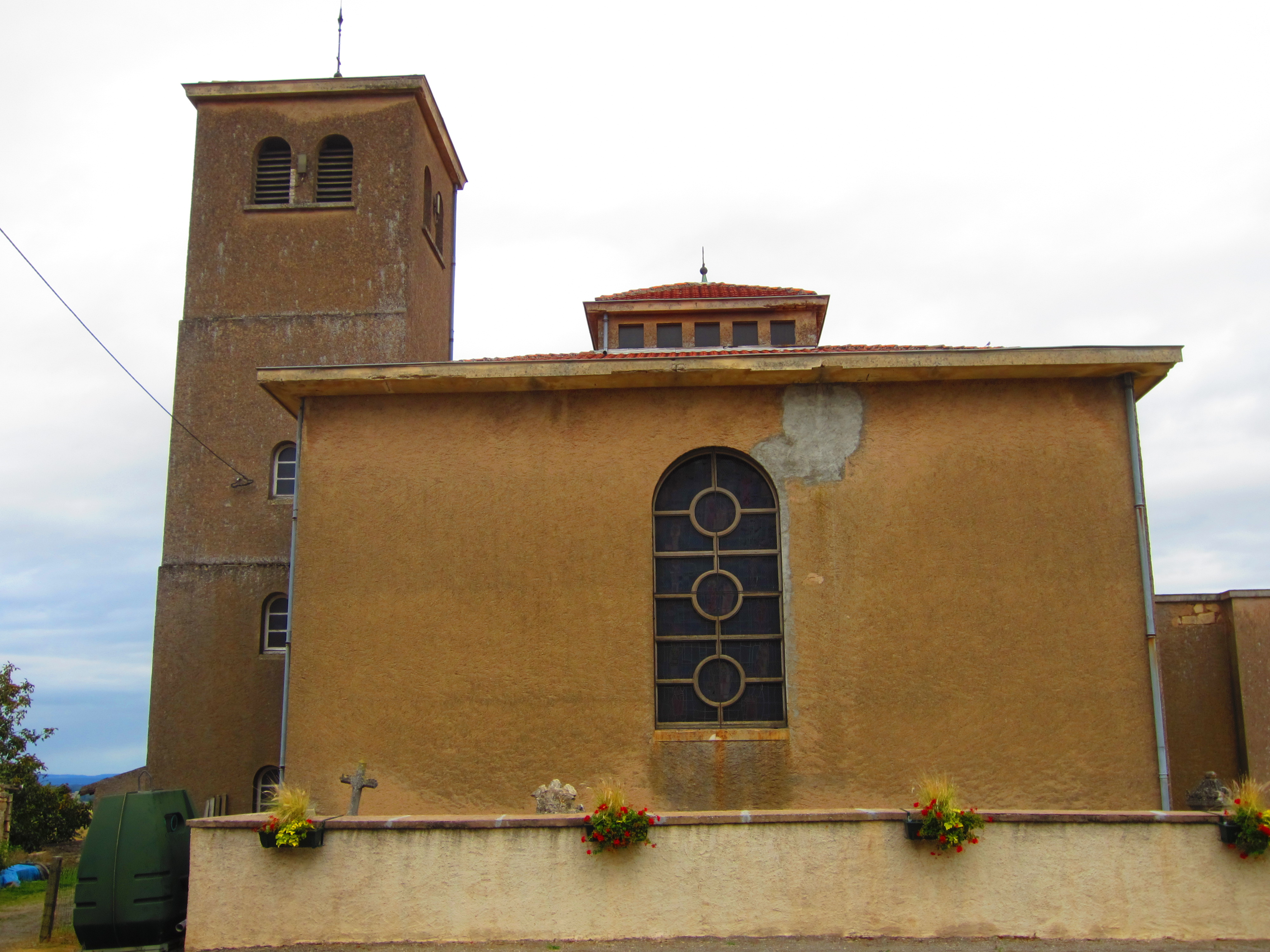
- The church in Juville

- Coat of arms
- Location of Juville
- Location within France Location within Grand Est
- Coordinates: 48°55′51″N 6°20′51″E
- Country: France
- Region: Grand Est
- Department: Moselle
- Arrondissement: Sarrebourg-Château-Salins
- Canton: Le Saulnois
- Intercommunality: CC du Saulnois

Government
  - Mayor (2020–2026): Hervé Blasselle
- Area^{1}: 6.05 km^{2} (2.34 sq mi)
- Elevation: 260 m (850 ft)
- Highest elevation: 392 m (1,286 ft)
- Lowest elevation: 252 m (827 ft)
- Population (2023): 146
  - Density: 24.1/km^{2} (62.5/sq mi)
- Time zone: UTC+01:00 (CET)
  - Summer (DST): UTC+02:00 (CEST)
- INSEE/Postal code: 57354 /57590
- ^{1} French Land Register data, which excludes lakes, ponds, glaciers > 1 km^{2} (0.386 sq mi or 247 acres) and river estuaries.

Juville (French pronunciation: [ʒyvil]; German: Juweiler) is a commune in the Moselle department in Grand Est in north-eastern France.

== See also ==
- Communes of the Moselle department
