= Vaxy =

- Commune
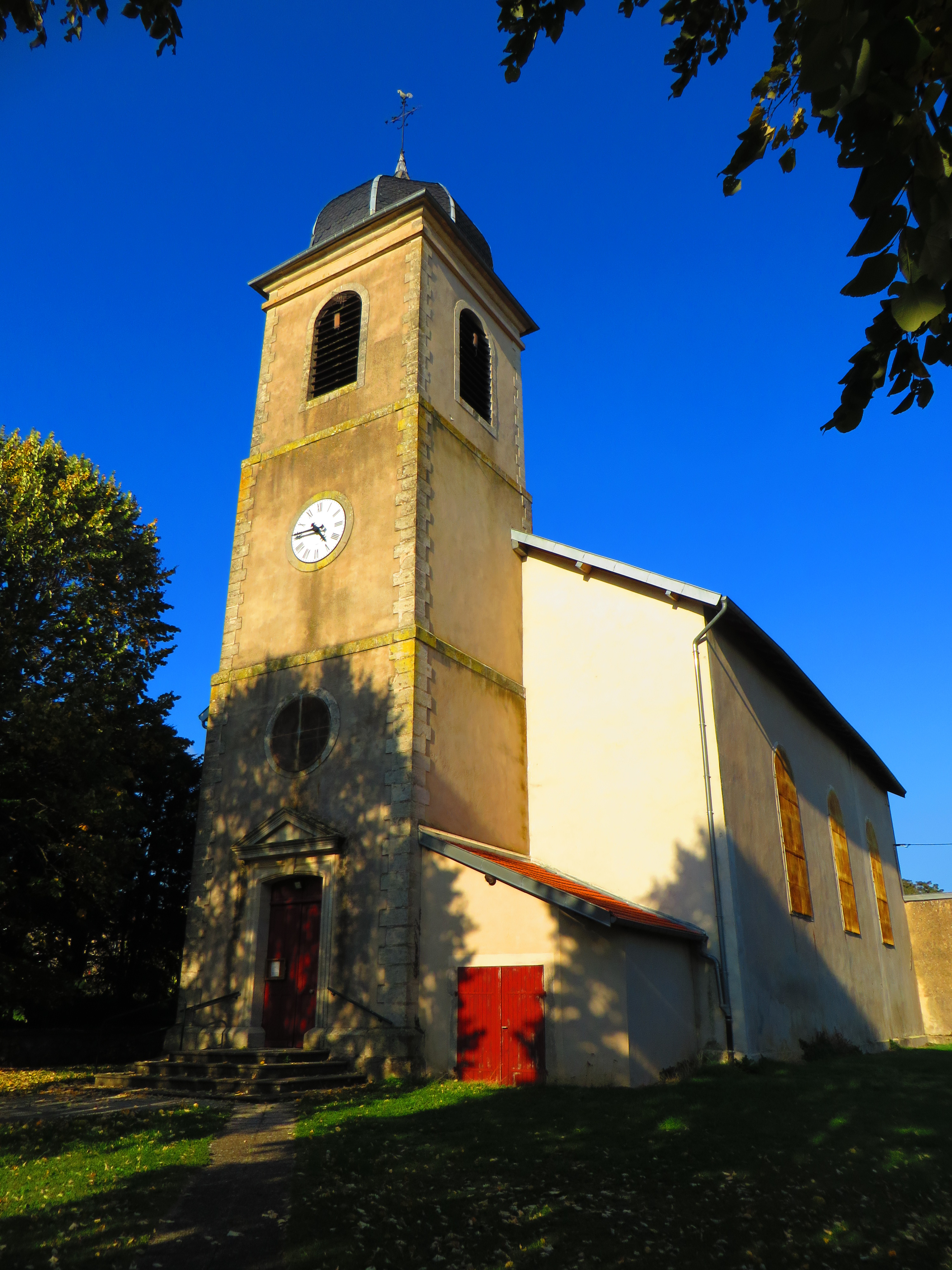
- The church in Vaxy

- Coat of arms
- Location of Vaxy
- Location within France Location within Grand Est
- Coordinates: 48°51′33″N 6°31′51″E
- Country: France
- Region: Grand Est
- Department: Moselle
- Arrondissement: Sarrebourg-Château-Salins
- Canton: Le Saulnois
- Intercommunality: CC du Saulnois

Government
  - Mayor (2024–2026): Frédéric Cezard
- Area^{1}: 5.31 km^{2} (2.05 sq mi)
- Elevation: 223 m (732 ft)
- Highest elevation: 337 m (1,106 ft)
- Lowest elevation: 206 m (676 ft)
- Population (2023): 169
  - Density: 31.8/km^{2} (82.4/sq mi)
- Time zone: UTC+01:00 (CET)
  - Summer (DST): UTC+02:00 (CEST)
- INSEE/Postal code: 57702 /57170
- ^{1} French Land Register data, which excludes lakes, ponds, glaciers > 1 km^{2} (0.386 sq mi or 247 acres) and river estuaries.

Vaxy (German: Wastingen) is a commune in the Moselle department in Grand Est in north-eastern France.

== See also ==
- Communes of the Moselle department
