= Lhor =

- Commune
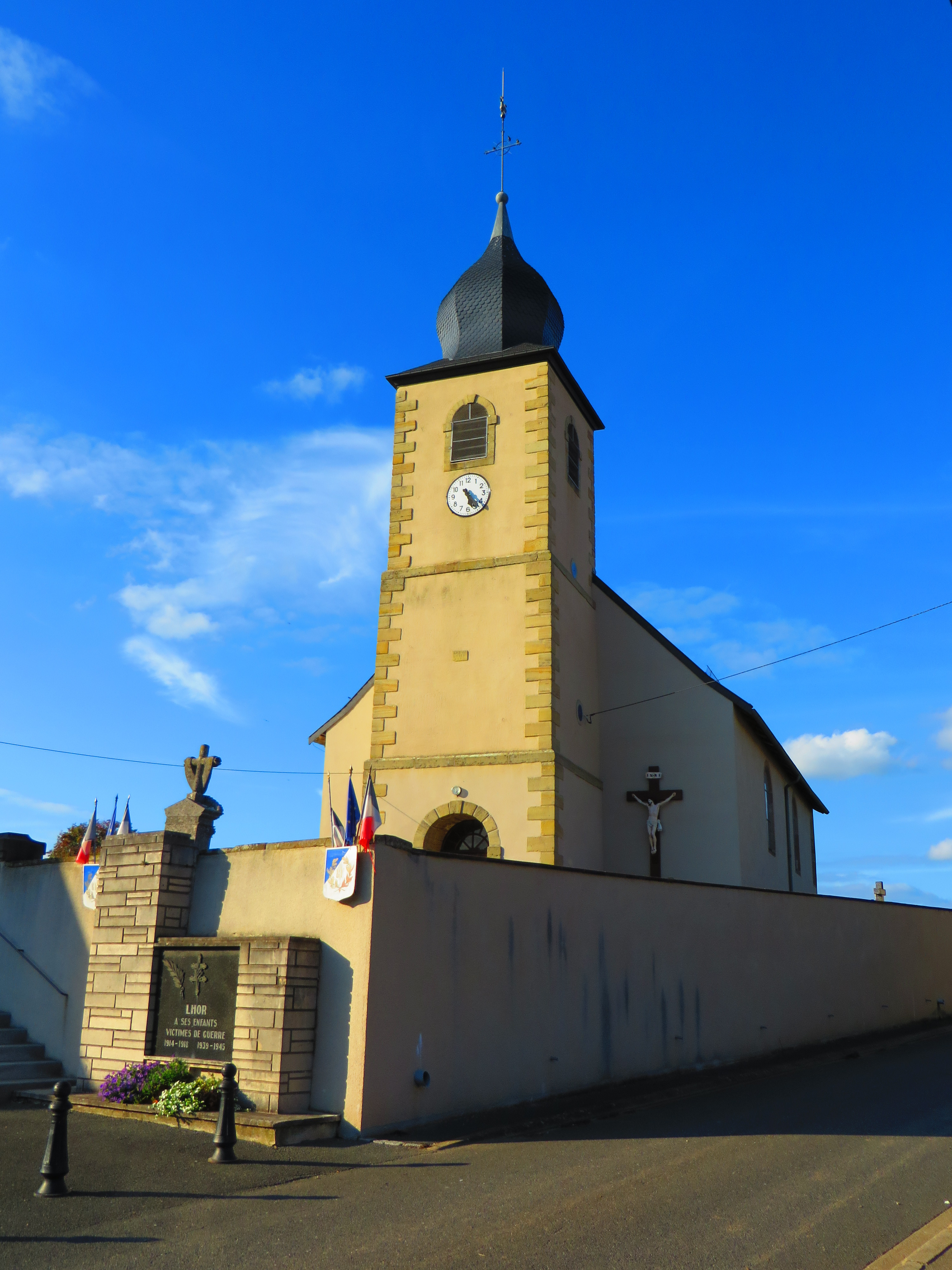
- The church in Lhor

- Coat of arms
- Location of Lhor
- Location within France Location within Grand Est
- Coordinates: 48°53′24″N 6°52′13″E
- Country: France
- Region: Grand Est
- Department: Moselle
- Arrondissement: Sarrebourg-Château-Salins
- Canton: Le Saulnois
- Intercommunality: CC du Saulnois

Government
  - Mayor (2020–2026): Philippe Metzger
- Area^{1}: 5.4 km^{2} (2.1 sq mi)
- Elevation: 235 m (771 ft)
- Highest elevation: 249 m (817 ft)
- Lowest elevation: 218 m (715 ft)
- Population (2023): 138
  - Density: 26/km^{2} (66/sq mi)
- Time zone: UTC+01:00 (CET)
  - Summer (DST): UTC+02:00 (CEST)
- INSEE/Postal code: 57410 /57670
- ^{1} French Land Register data, which excludes lakes, ponds, glaciers > 1 km^{2} (0.386 sq mi or 247 acres) and river estuaries.

Lhor (French pronunciation: [lɔʁ]; German: Lohr) is a commune in the Moselle department in Grand Est in north-eastern France.

== See also ==
- Communes of the Moselle department
