= Foville =

- Commune
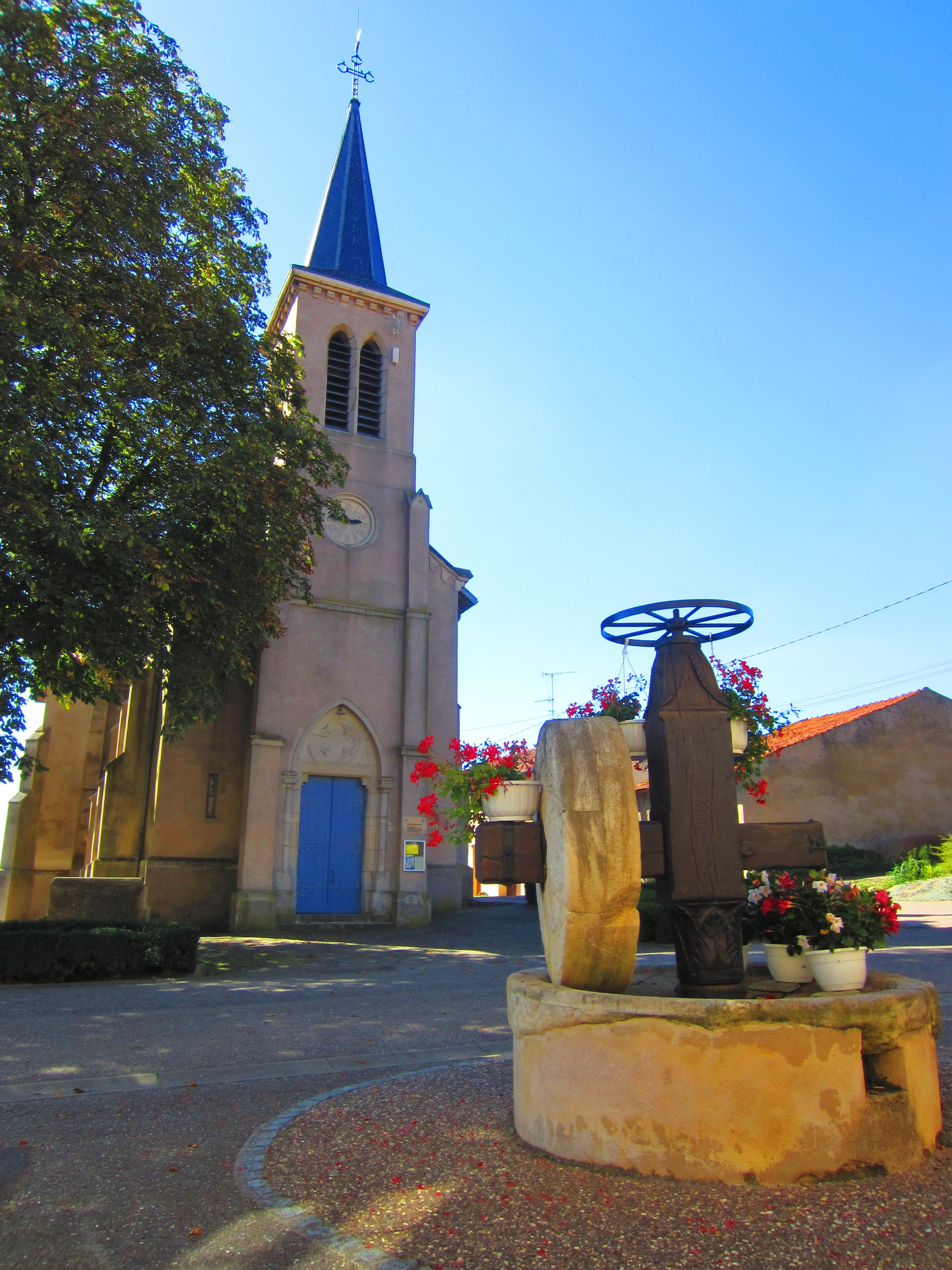
- The church in Foville

- Coat of arms
- Location of Foville
- Location within France Location within Grand Est
- Coordinates: 48°54′59″N 6°19′27″E
- Country: France
- Region: Grand Est
- Department: Moselle
- Arrondissement: Metz
- Canton: Le Saulnois
- Intercommunality: Sud Messin

Government
  - Mayor (2020–2026): Jean-Luc Etienne
- Area^{1}: 3.45 km^{2} (1.33 sq mi)
- Elevation: 260 m (850 ft)
- Highest elevation: 357 m (1,171 ft)
- Lowest elevation: 214 m (702 ft)
- Population (2023): 102
  - Density: 29.6/km^{2} (76.6/sq mi)
- Time zone: UTC+01:00 (CET)
  - Summer (DST): UTC+02:00 (CEST)
- INSEE/Postal code: 57231 /57420
- ^{1} French Land Register data, which excludes lakes, ponds, glaciers > 1 km^{2} (0.386 sq mi or 247 acres) and river estuaries.

Foville (French pronunciation: [fɔvil]; German: Folkheim) is a commune in the Moselle department in Grand Est in north-eastern France.

== See also ==
- Communes of the Moselle department
