= Fresnes-en-Saulnois =

- Commune
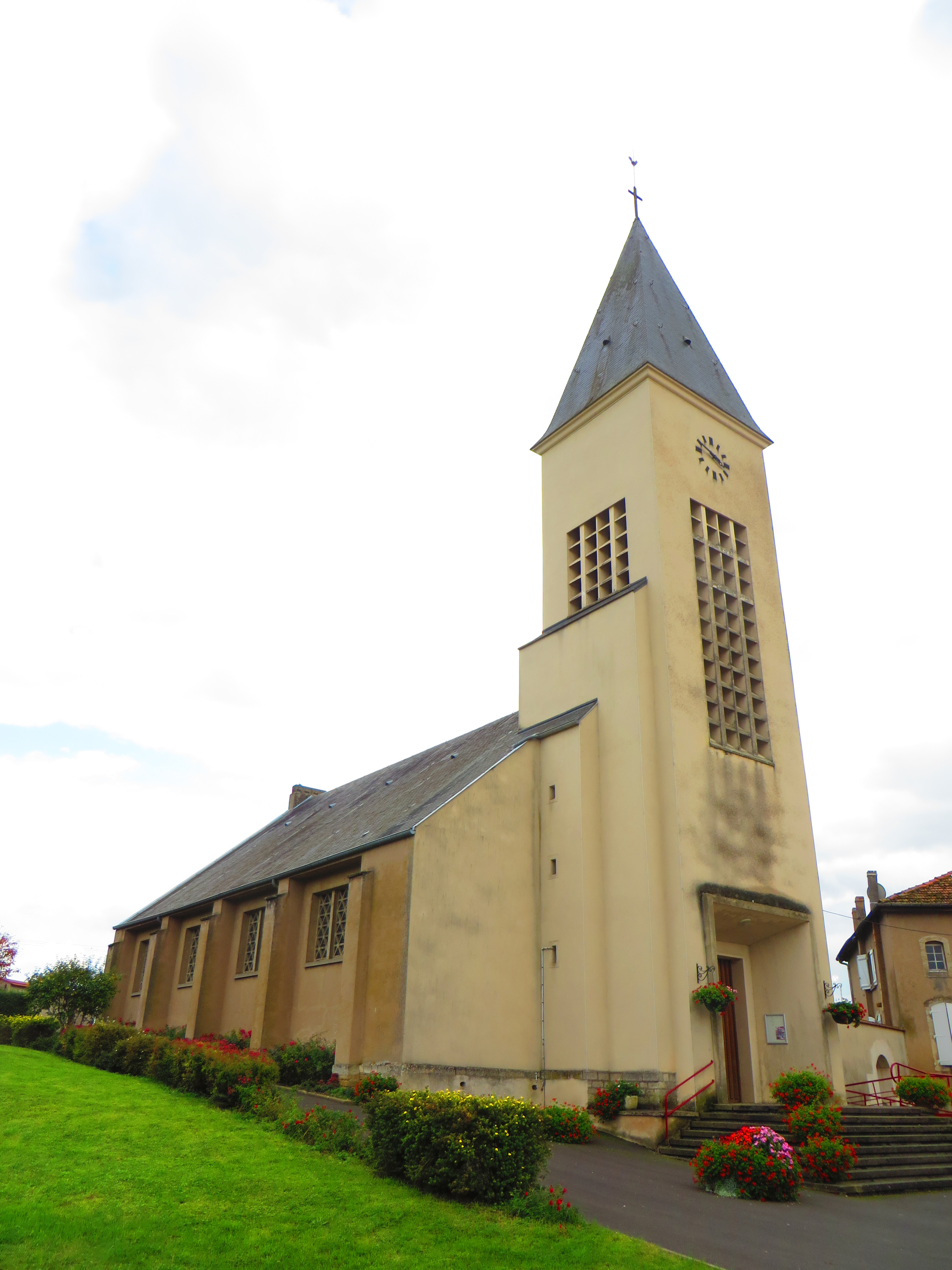
- The church in Fresnes

- Coat of arms
- Location of Fresnes-en-Saulnois
- Location within France Location within Grand Est
- Coordinates: 48°50′26″N 6°26′19″E
- Country: France
- Region: Grand Est
- Department: Moselle
- Arrondissement: Sarrebourg-Château-Salins
- Canton: Le Saulnois
- Intercommunality: CC du Saulnois

Government
  - Mayor (2020–2026): Raphaël Ciaramella
- Area^{1}: 12.89 km^{2} (4.98 sq mi)
- Elevation: 382 m (1,253 ft)
- Highest elevation: 336 m (1,102 ft)
- Lowest elevation: 243 m (797 ft)
- Population (2023): 191
  - Density: 14.8/km^{2} (38.4/sq mi)
- Time zone: UTC+01:00 (CET)
  - Summer (DST): UTC+02:00 (CEST)
- INSEE/Postal code: 57238 /57170
- ^{1} French Land Register data, which excludes lakes, ponds, glaciers > 1 km^{2} (0.386 sq mi or 247 acres) and river estuaries.

Fresnes-en-Saulnois (German: Eschen am Wald) is a commune in the Moselle department in Grand Est in north-eastern France.

== See also ==
- Communes of the Moselle department
