= Conthil =

- Commune
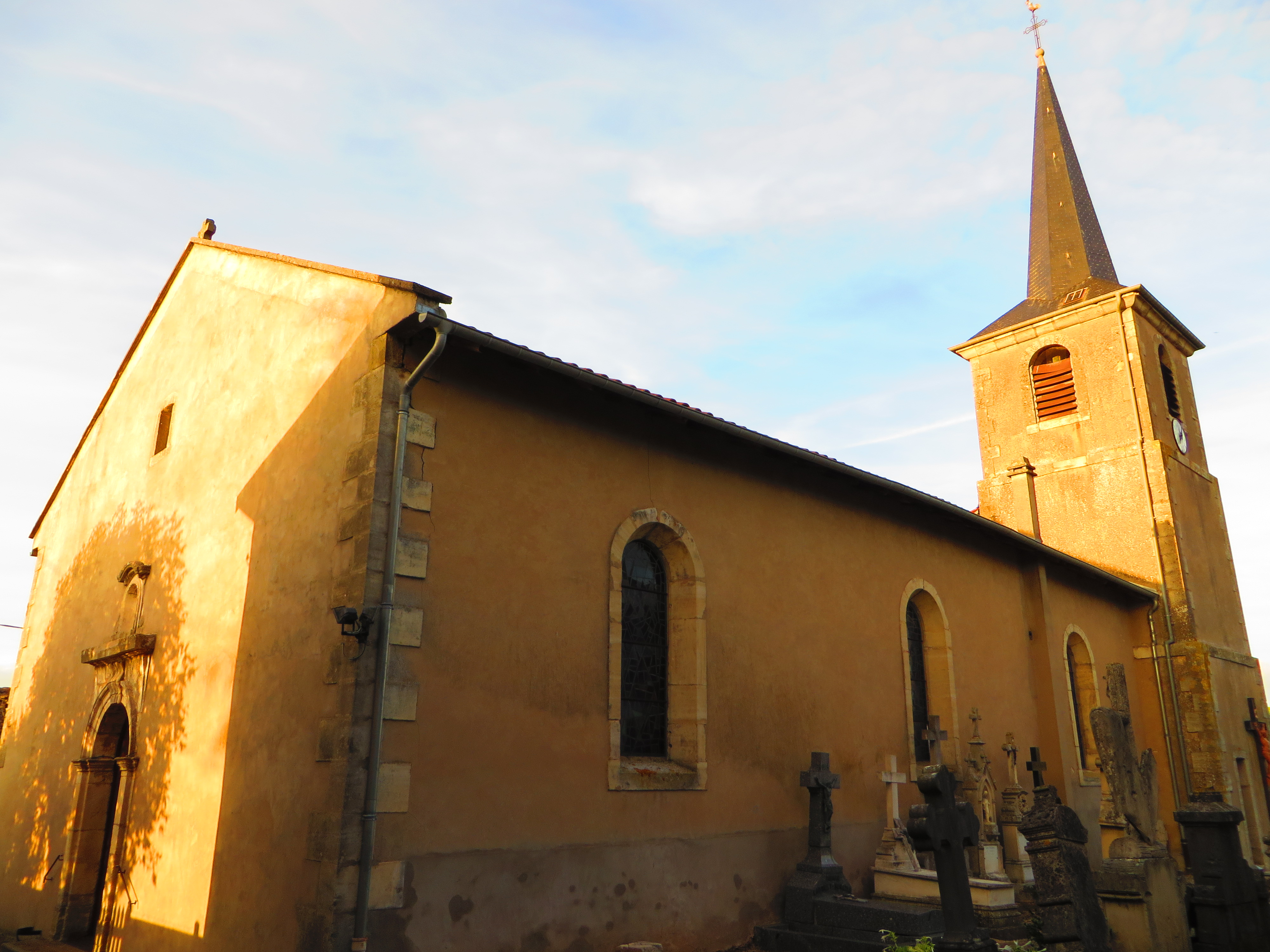
- The church in Conthil

- Coat of arms
- Location of Conthil
- Location within France Location within Grand Est
- Coordinates: 48°53′36″N 6°39′45″E
- Country: France
- Region: Grand Est
- Department: Moselle
- Arrondissement: Sarrebourg-Château-Salins
- Canton: Le Saulnois
- Intercommunality: CC du Saulnois

Government
  - Mayor (2023–2026): Olivier Romain
- Area^{1}: 9.31 km^{2} (3.59 sq mi)
- Elevation: 110 m (360 ft)
- Highest elevation: 320 m (1,050 ft)
- Lowest elevation: 219 m (719 ft)
- Population (2023): 148
  - Density: 15.9/km^{2} (41.2/sq mi)
- Time zone: UTC+01:00 (CET)
  - Summer (DST): UTC+02:00 (CEST)
- INSEE/Postal code: 57151 /57340
- ^{1} French Land Register data, which excludes lakes, ponds, glaciers > 1 km^{2} (0.386 sq mi or 247 acres) and river estuaries.

Conthil (French pronunciation: [kɔ̃til]; German: Conthil) is a commune in the Moselle department in Grand Est in north-eastern France.

== See also ==
- Communes of the Moselle department
