= Liocourt =

- Commune
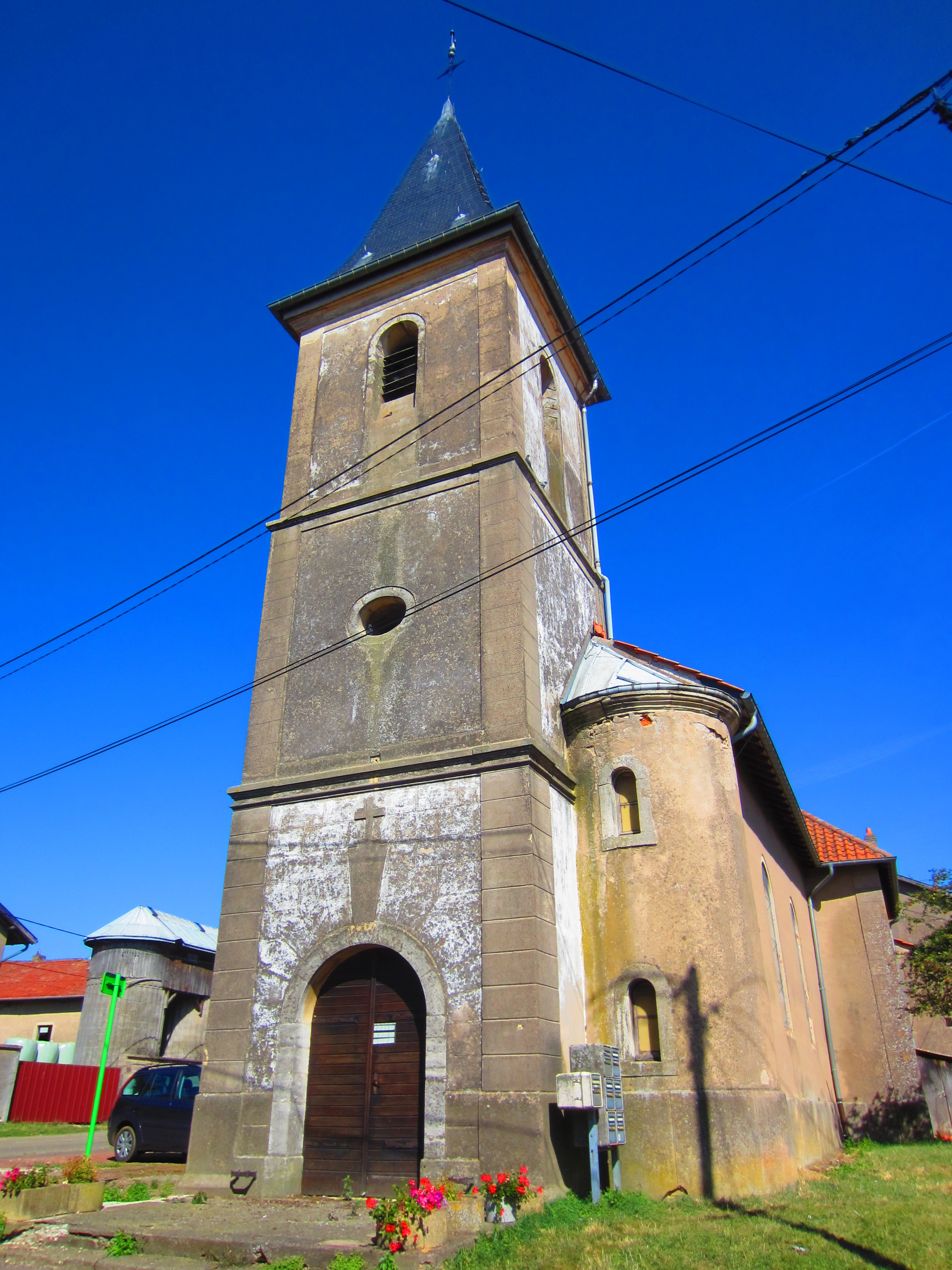
- The church in Liocourt

- Coat of arms
- Location of Liocourt
- Location within France Location within Grand Est
- Coordinates: 48°54′39″N 6°20′40″E
- Country: France
- Region: Grand Est
- Department: Moselle
- Arrondissement: Sarrebourg-Château-Salins
- Canton: Le Saulnois
- Intercommunality: CC du Saulnois

Government
  - Mayor (2020–2026): Stéphane Doux
- Area^{1}: 3.17 km^{2} (1.22 sq mi)
- Elevation: 290 m (950 ft)
- Highest elevation: 398 m (1,306 ft)
- Lowest elevation: 253 m (830 ft)
- Population (2023): 138
  - Density: 43.5/km^{2} (113/sq mi)
- Time zone: UTC+01:00 (CET)
  - Summer (DST): UTC+02:00 (CEST)
- INSEE/Postal code: 57406 /57590
- ^{1} French Land Register data, which excludes lakes, ponds, glaciers > 1 km^{2} (0.386 sq mi or 247 acres) and river estuaries.

Liocourt (French pronunciation: [ljɔkuʁ]; German: Linhofen) is a commune in the Moselle department in Grand Est in north-eastern France.

== See also ==
- Communes of the Moselle department
