= Gerbécourt =

- Commune
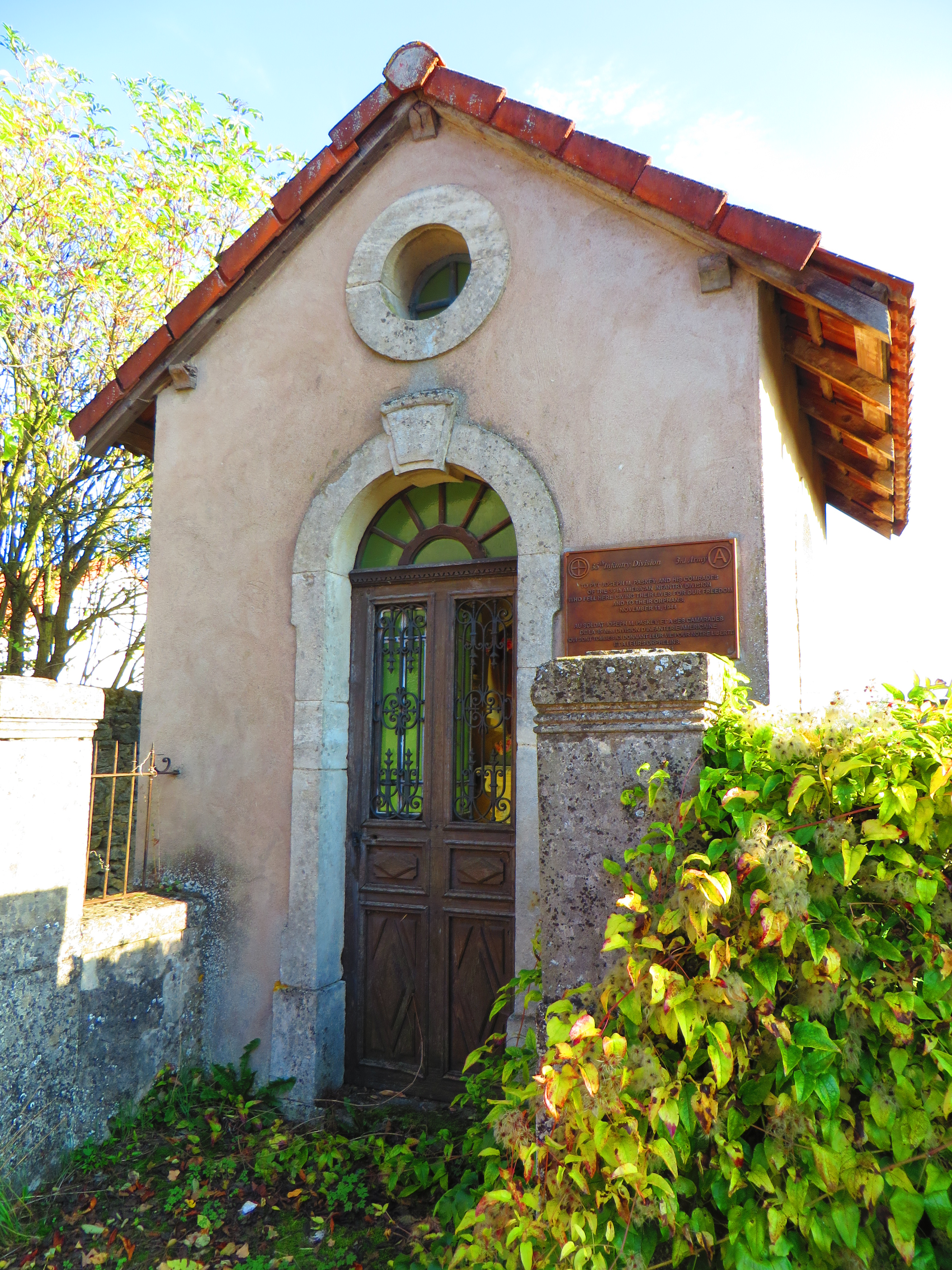
- The chapel in Gerbécourt

- Coat of arms
- Location of Gerbécourt
- Location within France Location within Grand Est
- Coordinates: 48°51′09″N 6°30′54″E
- Country: France
- Region: Grand Est
- Department: Moselle
- Arrondissement: Sarrebourg-Château-Salins
- Canton: Le Saulnois
- Intercommunality: CC du Saulnois

Government
  - Mayor (2020–2026): Jacques Dehand
- Area^{1}: 2.95 km^{2} (1.14 sq mi)
- Elevation: 268 m (879 ft)
- Highest elevation: 354 m (1,161 ft)
- Lowest elevation: 206 m (676 ft)
- Population (2023): 85
  - Density: 29/km^{2} (75/sq mi)
- Time zone: UTC+01:00 (CET)
  - Summer (DST): UTC+02:00 (CEST)
- INSEE/Postal code: 57247 /57170
- ^{1} French Land Register data, which excludes lakes, ponds, glaciers > 1 km^{2} (0.386 sq mi or 247 acres) and river estuaries.

Gerbécourt (French pronunciation: [ʒɛʁbekuʁ]; German: Gerbertshofen) is a commune in the Moselle department in Grand Est in north-eastern France.

== See also ==
- Communes of the Moselle department
