= Domnom-lès-Dieuze =

Domnon-lès-Dieuze
- Commune
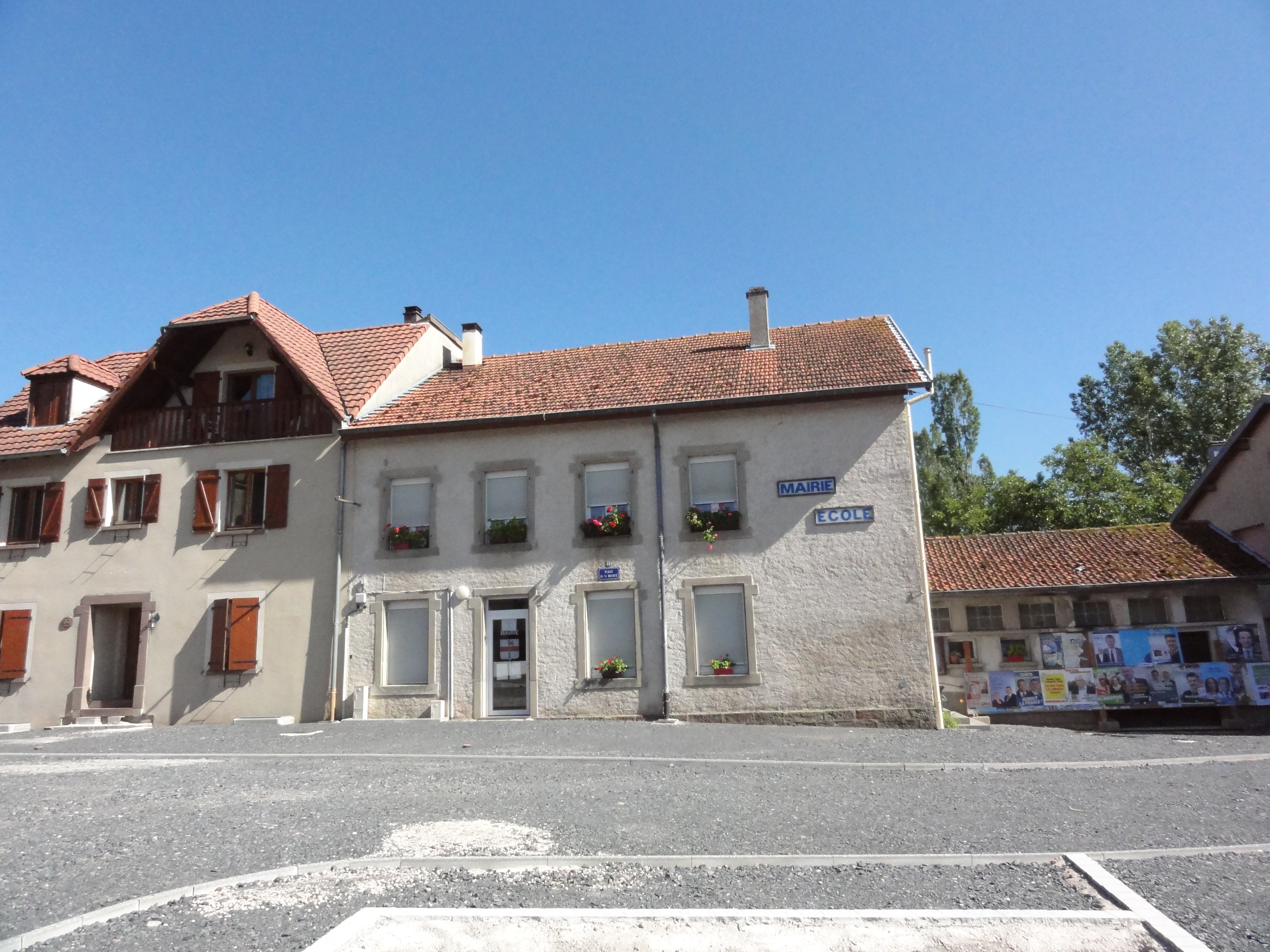
- The town hall and school in Domnom-lès-Dieuze

- Coat of arms
- Location of Domnon-lès-Dieuze
- Location within France Location within Grand Est
- Coordinates: 48°51′41″N 6°49′24″E
- Country: France
- Region: Grand Est
- Department: Moselle
- Arrondissement: Sarrebourg-Château-Salins
- Canton: Le Saulnois
- Intercommunality: Saulnois

Government
  - Mayor (2020–2026): Micheline Thirion
- Area^{1}: 6.63 km^{2} (2.56 sq mi)
- Elevation: 220 m (720 ft)
- Highest elevation: 290 m (950 ft)
- Lowest elevation: 213 m (699 ft)
- Population (2023): 100
  - Density: 15/km^{2} (39/sq mi)
- Time zone: UTC+01:00 (CET)
  - Summer (DST): UTC+02:00 (CEST)
- INSEE/Postal code: 57181 /57260
- ^{1} French Land Register data, which excludes lakes, ponds, glaciers > 1 km^{2} (0.386 sq mi or 247 acres) and river estuaries.

Domnom-lès-Dieuze (French pronunciation: [dɔ̃nɔ̃ lɛ djøz], literally Domnom near Dieuze; German: Dommenheim) is a commune in the Moselle department in Grand Est in north-eastern France.

Prior to 1 July 1994, it was known as Domnon-lès-Dieuze.

== See also ==
- Communes of the Moselle department
