= Château-Bréhain =

- Commune
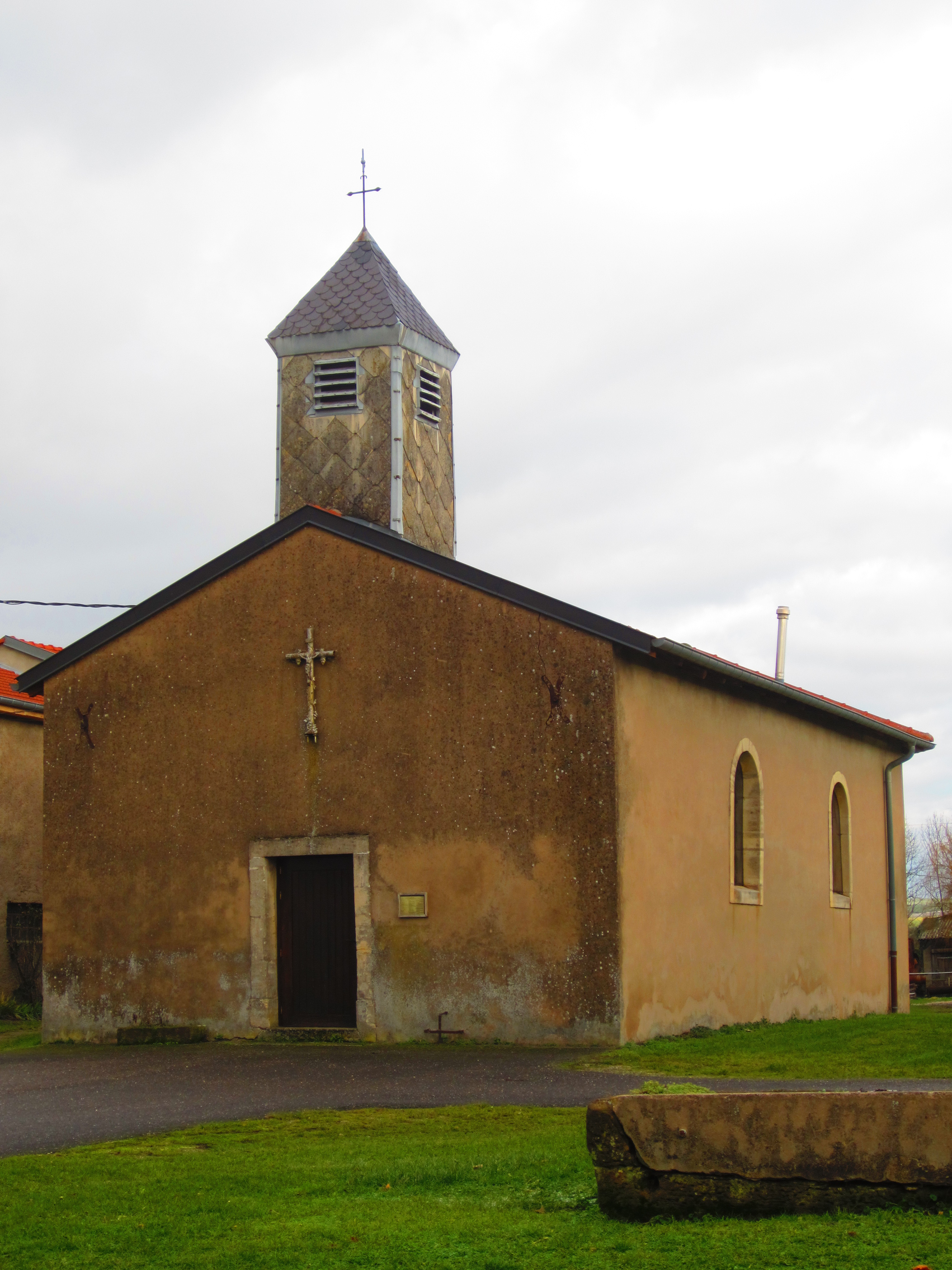
- The chapel in Château-Bréhain

- Coat of arms
- Location of Château-Bréhain
- Location within France Location within Grand Est
- Coordinates: 48°54′16″N 6°31′35″E
- Country: France
- Region: Grand Est
- Department: Moselle
- Arrondissement: Sarrebourg-Château-Salins
- Canton: Le Saulnois
- Intercommunality: CC du Saulnois

Government
  - Mayor (2024–2026): Michel Lallement
- Area^{1}: 6.11 km^{2} (2.36 sq mi)
- Elevation: 240 m (790 ft)
- Highest elevation: 335 m (1,099 ft)
- Lowest elevation: 238 m (781 ft)
- Population (2023): 69
  - Density: 11/km^{2} (29/sq mi)
- Time zone: UTC+01:00 (CET)
  - Summer (DST): UTC+02:00 (CEST)
- INSEE/Postal code: 57130 /57340
- ^{1} French Land Register data, which excludes lakes, ponds, glaciers > 1 km^{2} (0.386 sq mi or 247 acres) and river estuaries.

Château-Bréhain (French pronunciation: [ʃɑto bʁe.ɛ̃]; German: Bruch-Kastel) is a commune in the Moselle department in Grand Est in north-eastern France.

== See also ==
- Communes of the Moselle department
