= Zommange =

- Commune
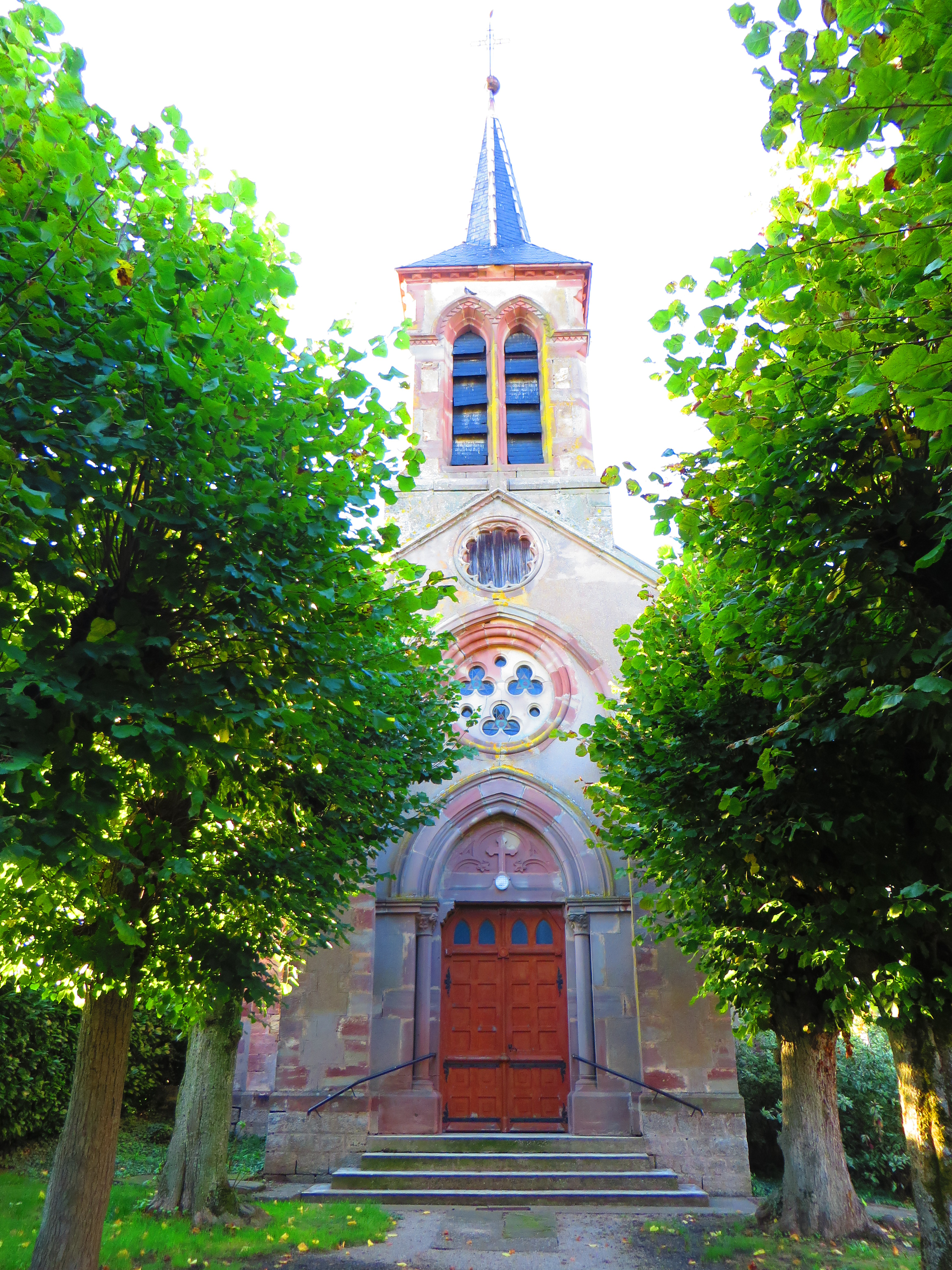
- The church in Zommange

- Coat of arms
- Location of Zommange
- Location within France Location within Grand Est
- Coordinates: 48°49′30″N 6°48′20″E
- Country: France
- Region: Grand Est
- Department: Moselle
- Arrondissement: Sarrebourg-Château-Salins
- Canton: Le Saulnois
- Intercommunality: Saulnois

Government
  - Mayor (2020–2026): Jean-Luc Gaillot
- Area^{1}: 6.34 km^{2} (2.45 sq mi)
- Elevation: 200 m (660 ft)
- Highest elevation: 242 m (794 ft)
- Lowest elevation: 210 m (690 ft)
- Population (2023): 43
  - Density: 6.8/km^{2} (18/sq mi)
- Demonym(s): Zommangeois, Zommangeoises
- Time zone: UTC+01:00 (CET)
  - Summer (DST): UTC+02:00 (CEST)
- INSEE/Postal code: 57763 /57260
- ^{1} French Land Register data, which excludes lakes, ponds, glaciers > 1 km^{2} (0.386 sq mi or 247 acres) and river estuaries.

Zommange (French pronunciation: [zɔmɑ̃ʒ]; German: Zemmingen) is a commune in the Moselle department in Grand Est in north-eastern France.

== Population ==
Historical population

Year	Pop.	±% p.a.
1793	75	—
1821	105	+1.21%
1846	143	+1.24%
1871	123	−0.60%
1900	82	−1.39%
1926	75	−0.34%
1946	51	−1.91%
1962	67	+1.72%
1968	54	−3.53%

Year	Pop.	±% p.a.
1975	53	−0.27%
1982	52	−0.27%
1990	37	−4.16%
1999	35	−0.62%
2007	36	+0.35%
2012	35	−0.56%
2017	44	+4.68%
2023	43	−0.38%

Source: EHESS and INSEE

== See also ==
- Communes of the Moselle department
- Parc naturel régional de Lorraine
