= Bourgaltroff =

- Commune
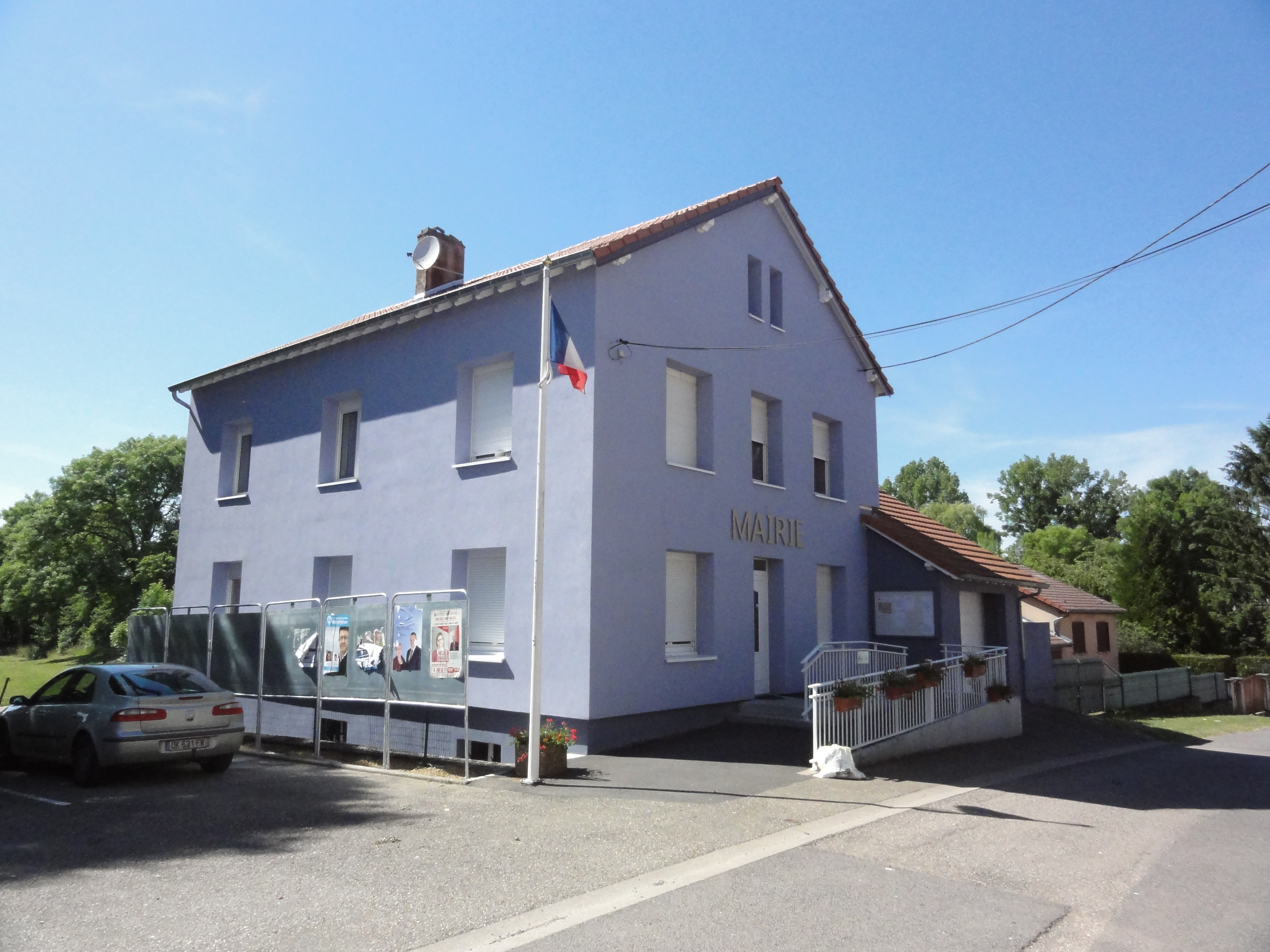
- The town hall in Bourgaltroff

- Coat of arms
- Location of Bourgaltroff
- Location within France Location within Grand Est
- Coordinates: 48°52′10″N 6°45′34″E
- Country: France
- Region: Grand Est
- Department: Moselle
- Arrondissement: Sarrebourg-Château-Salins
- Canton: Le Saulnois
- Intercommunality: CC Saulnois

Government
  - Mayor (2020–2026): Sylvain Hinschberger
- Area^{1}: 9.75 km^{2} (3.76 sq mi)
- Elevation: 240 m (790 ft)
- Highest elevation: 312 m (1,024 ft)
- Lowest elevation: 217 m (712 ft)
- Population (2023): 221
  - Density: 22.7/km^{2} (58.7/sq mi)
- Time zone: UTC+01:00 (CET)
  - Summer (DST): UTC+02:00 (CEST)
- INSEE/Postal code: 57098 /57260
- ^{1} French Land Register data, which excludes lakes, ponds, glaciers > 1 km^{2} (0.386 sq mi or 247 acres) and river estuaries.

Bourgaltroff (French pronunciation: [buʁɡaltʁɔf]; German: Burgaltdorf) is a commune in the Moselle department in Grand Est in northeastern France.

== Population ==
Historical population
| Year | Pop. | ±% p.a. |
|---|---|---|
| 1968 | 251 | — |
| 1975 | 207 | −2.72% |
| 1982 | 226 | +1.26% |
| 1990 | 238 | +0.65% |
| 1999 | 239 | +0.05% |
| 2007 | 280 | +2.00% |
| 2012 | 290 | +0.70% |
| 2017 | 245 | −3.32% |
| 2023 | 221 | −1.70% |
Source: INSEE

== See also ==
- Communes of the Moselle department
