= Moncheux =

- Commune
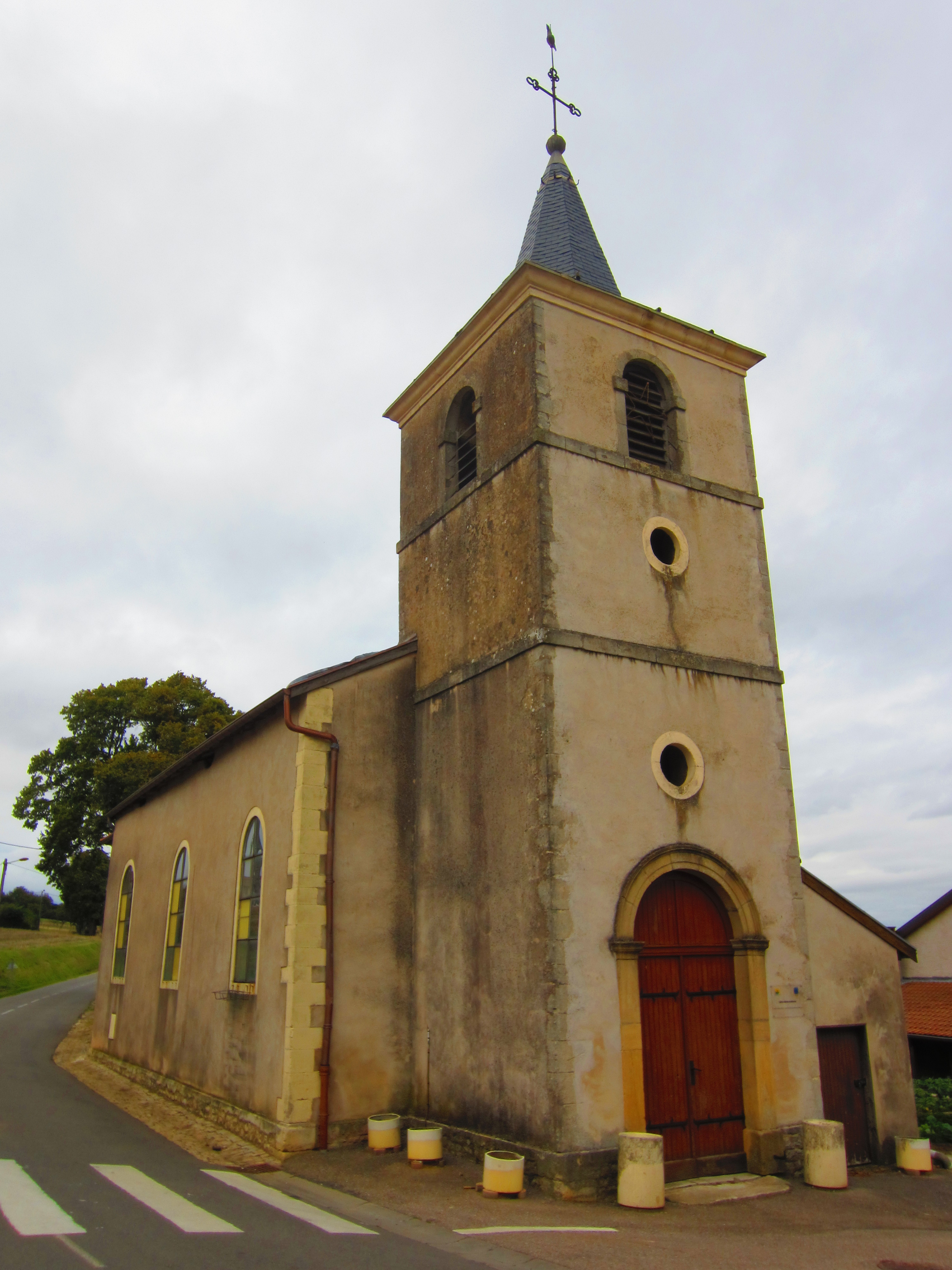
- The church in Moncheux

- Coat of arms
- Location of Moncheux
- Location within France Location within Grand Est
- Coordinates: 48°56′12″N 6°20′15″E
- Country: France
- Region: Grand Est
- Department: Moselle
- Arrondissement: Metz
- Canton: Le Saulnois
- Intercommunality: Sud Messin

Government
  - Mayor (2020–2026): Sébastien Mauvignant
- Area^{1}: 7.35 km^{2} (2.84 sq mi)
- Elevation: 400 m (1,300 ft)
- Highest elevation: 365 m (1,198 ft)
- Lowest elevation: 242 m (794 ft)
- Population (2023): 146
  - Density: 19.9/km^{2} (51.4/sq mi)
- Time zone: UTC+01:00 (CET)
  - Summer (DST): UTC+02:00 (CEST)
- INSEE/Postal code: 57472 /57420
- ^{1} French Land Register data, which excludes lakes, ponds, glaciers > 1 km^{2} (0.386 sq mi or 247 acres) and river estuaries.

Moncheux (French pronunciation: [mɔ̃ʃø]; German: Monchern) is a commune in the Moselle department in Grand Est in north-eastern France. It is 35 km north of Nancy and about 50 km south west from the border with Germany.

== See also ==
- Communes of the Moselle department
