= Canton of Le Saulnois =

Administrative division in France

Coordinates: 48.82°N 6.51°E

The canton of Le Saulnois is an administrative division of the Moselle department, northeastern France. Its borders were modified at the French canton reorganisation which came into effect in March 2015. Its seat is in Château-Salins.

It consists of the following communes:

1. Aboncourt-sur-Seille
2. Achain
3. Ajoncourt
4. Alaincourt-la-Côte
5. Albestroff
6. Amelécourt
7. Attilloncourt
8. Aulnois-sur-Seille
9. Bacourt
10. Bassing
11. Baudrecourt
12. Bellange
13. Bénestroff
14. Bermering
15. Bezange-la-Petite
16. Bidestroff
17. Bioncourt
18. Blanche-Église
19. Bourgaltroff
20. Bourdonnay
21. Bréhain
22. Burlioncourt
23. Chambrey
24. Château-Bréhain
25. Château-Salins
26. Château-Voué
27. Chenois
28. Chicourt
29. Conthil
30. Craincourt
31. Cutting
32. Dalhain
33. Delme
34. Dieuze
35. Domnom-lès-Dieuze
36. Donjeux
37. Donnelay
38. Fonteny
39. Fossieux
40. Foville
41. Francaltroff
42. Frémery
43. Fresnes-en-Saulnois
44. Gelucourt
45. Gerbécourt
46. Givrycourt
47. Grémecey
48. Guébestroff
49. Guéblange-lès-Dieuze
50. Guébling
51. Guinzeling
52. Haboudange
53. Hampont
54. Hannocourt
55. Haraucourt-sur-Seille
56. Honskirch
57. Insming
58. Insviller
59. Jallaucourt
60. Juvelize
61. Juville
62. Lagarde
63. Laneuveville-en-Saulnois
64. Lemoncourt
65. Léning
66. Lesse
67. Ley
68. Lezey
69. Lidrezing
70. Lindre-Basse
71. Lindre-Haute
72. Liocourt
73. Lhor
74. Lostroff
75. Loudrefing
76. Lubécourt
77. Lucy
78. Maizières-lès-Vic
79. Malaucourt-sur-Seille
80. Manhoué
81. Marimont-lès-Bénestroff
82. Marsal
83. Marthille
84. Molring
85. Moncheux
86. Moncourt
87. Montdidier
88. Morville-lès-Vic
89. Morville-sur-Nied
90. Moyenvic
91. Mulcey
92. Munster
93. Nébing
94. Neufvillage
95. Obreck
96. Ommeray
97. Oriocourt
98. Oron
99. Pettoncourt
100. Pévange
101. Prévocourt
102. Puttigny
103. Puzieux
104. Réning
105. Riche
106. Rodalbe
107. Rorbach-lès-Dieuze
108. Sailly-Achâtel
109. Saint-Epvre
110. Saint-Jure
111. Saint-Médard
112. Salonnes
113. Secourt
114. Sotzeling
115. Tarquimpol
116. Tincry
117. Torcheville
118. Vahl-lès-Bénestroff
119. Val-de-Bride
120. Vannecourt
121. Vaxy
122. Vergaville
123. Vibersviller
124. Vic-sur-Seille
125. Vigny
126. Villers-sur-Nied
127. Virming
128. Vittersbourg
129. Viviers
130. Vulmont
131. Wuisse
132. Xanrey
133. Xocourt
134. Zarbeling
135. Zommange
