= Bioncourt =

- Commune
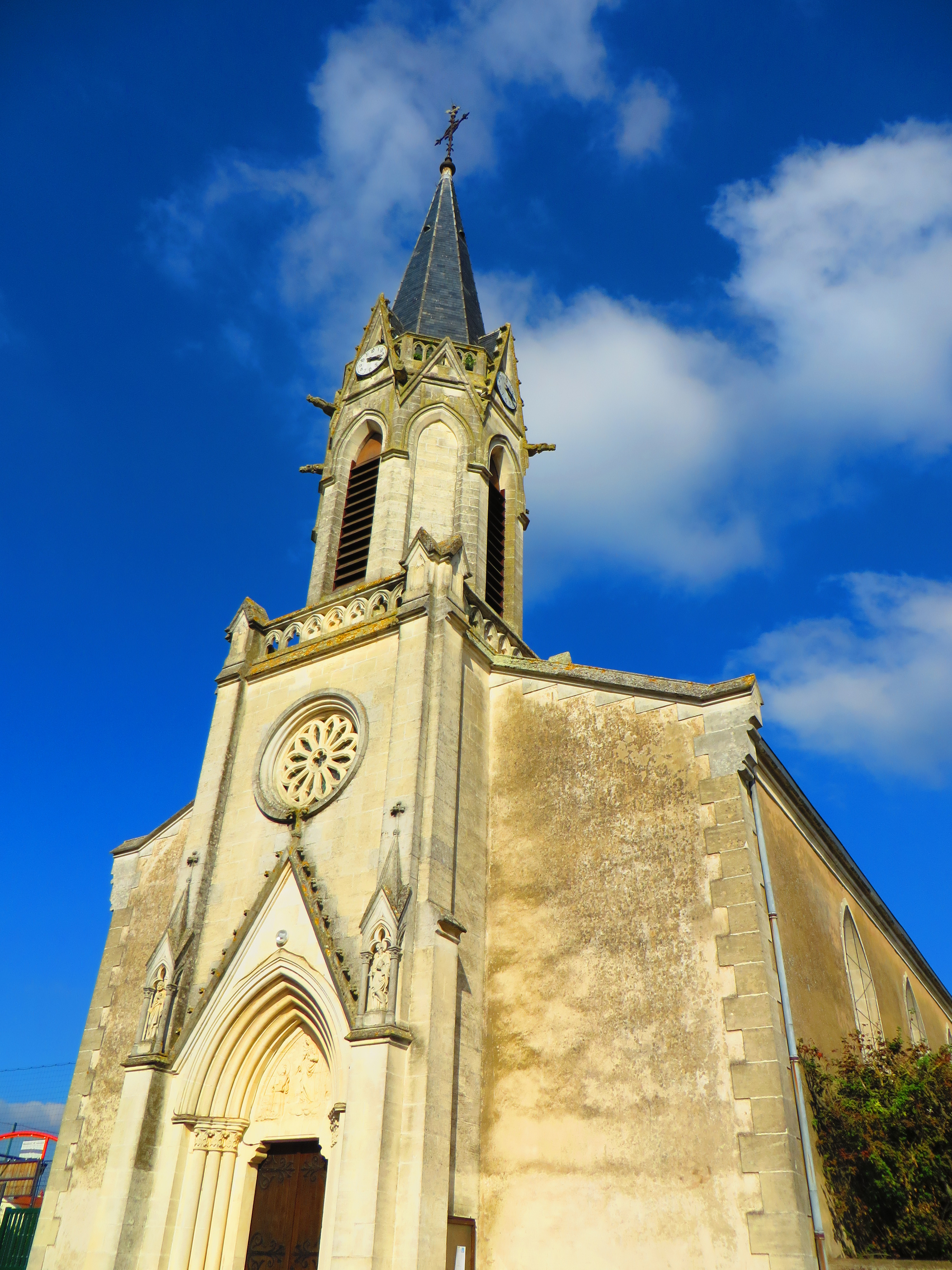
- The church in Bioncourt

- Coat of arms
- Location of Bioncourt
- Location within France Location within Grand Est
- Coordinates: 48°47′39″N 6°21′46″E
- Country: France
- Region: Grand Est
- Department: Moselle
- Arrondissement: Sarrebourg-Château-Salins
- Canton: Le Saulnois
- Intercommunality: CC Saulnois

Government
  - Mayor (2020–2026): Patrick Michel
- Area^{1}: 8.21 km^{2} (3.17 sq mi)
- Elevation: 210 m (690 ft)
- Highest elevation: 290 m (950 ft)
- Lowest elevation: 194 m (636 ft)
- Population (2023): 300
  - Density: 37/km^{2} (95/sq mi)
- Time zone: UTC+01:00 (CET)
  - Summer (DST): UTC+02:00 (CEST)
- INSEE/Postal code: 57084 /57170
- ^{1} French Land Register data, which excludes lakes, ponds, glaciers > 1 km^{2} (0.386 sq mi or 247 acres) and river estuaries.

Bioncourt (French pronunciation: [bjɔ̃kuʁ]; German: Bionshofen) is a commune in the Moselle department in Grand Est in northeastern France.

== Population ==
Historical population
Year	Pop.	±% p.a.
1968	233	—
1975	224	−0.56%
1982	282	+3.34%
1990	310	+1.19%
1999	309	−0.04%
2007	311	+0.08%
2012	325	+0.88%
2017	307	−1.13%
2023	300	−0.38%
Source: INSEE

== See also ==
- Communes of the Moselle department
