= Val-de-Bride =

- Commune
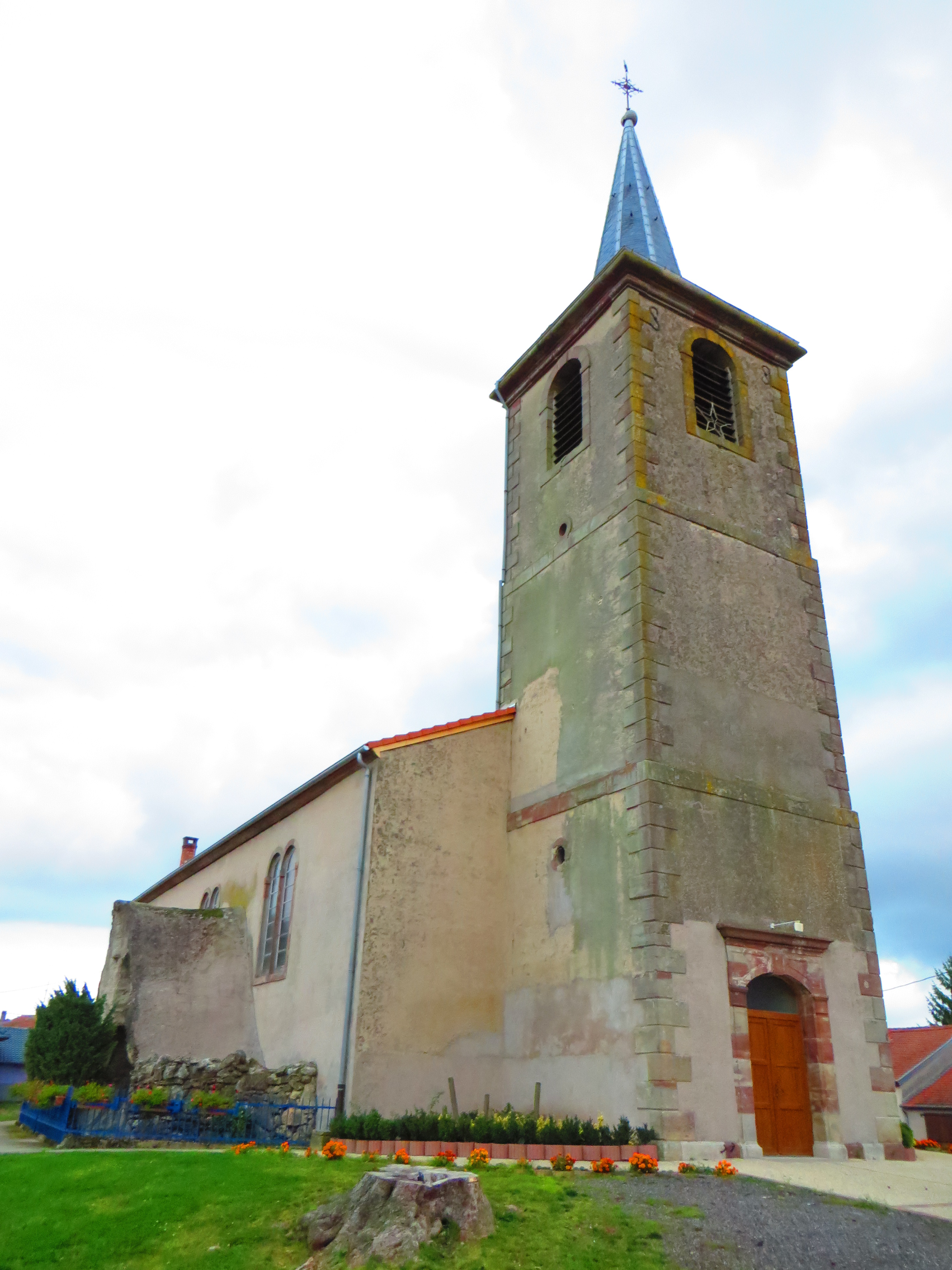
- The church in Val-de-Bride

- Coat of arms
- Location of Val-de-Bride
- Location within France Location within Grand Est
- Coordinates: 48°49′34″N 6°41′55″E
- Country: France
- Region: Grand Est
- Department: Moselle
- Arrondissement: Sarrebourg-Château-Salins
- Canton: Le Saulnois
- Intercommunality: CC du Saulnois

Government
  - Mayor (2020–2026): Jacques Lair
- Area^{1}: 11.12 km^{2} (4.29 sq mi)
- Elevation: 220 m (720 ft)
- Highest elevation: 330 m (1,080 ft)
- Lowest elevation: 204 m (669 ft)
- Population (2023): 511
  - Density: 46.0/km^{2} (119/sq mi)
- Time zone: UTC+01:00 (CET)
  - Summer (DST): UTC+02:00 (CEST)
- INSEE/Postal code: 57270 /57260
- ^{1} French Land Register data, which excludes lakes, ponds, glaciers > 1 km^{2} (0.386 sq mi or 247 acres) and river estuaries.

Val-de-Bride (French pronunciation: [val də bʁid]) is a commune in the Moselle department in Grand Est in north-eastern France. The commune was established in 1973 by the merger of the former communes Guénestroff and Kerprich-lès-Dieuze (German: Genesdorf and Kerprich bei Duß).

== See also ==
- Communes of the Moselle department
- Parc naturel régional de Lorraine
