= Vulmont =

- Commune
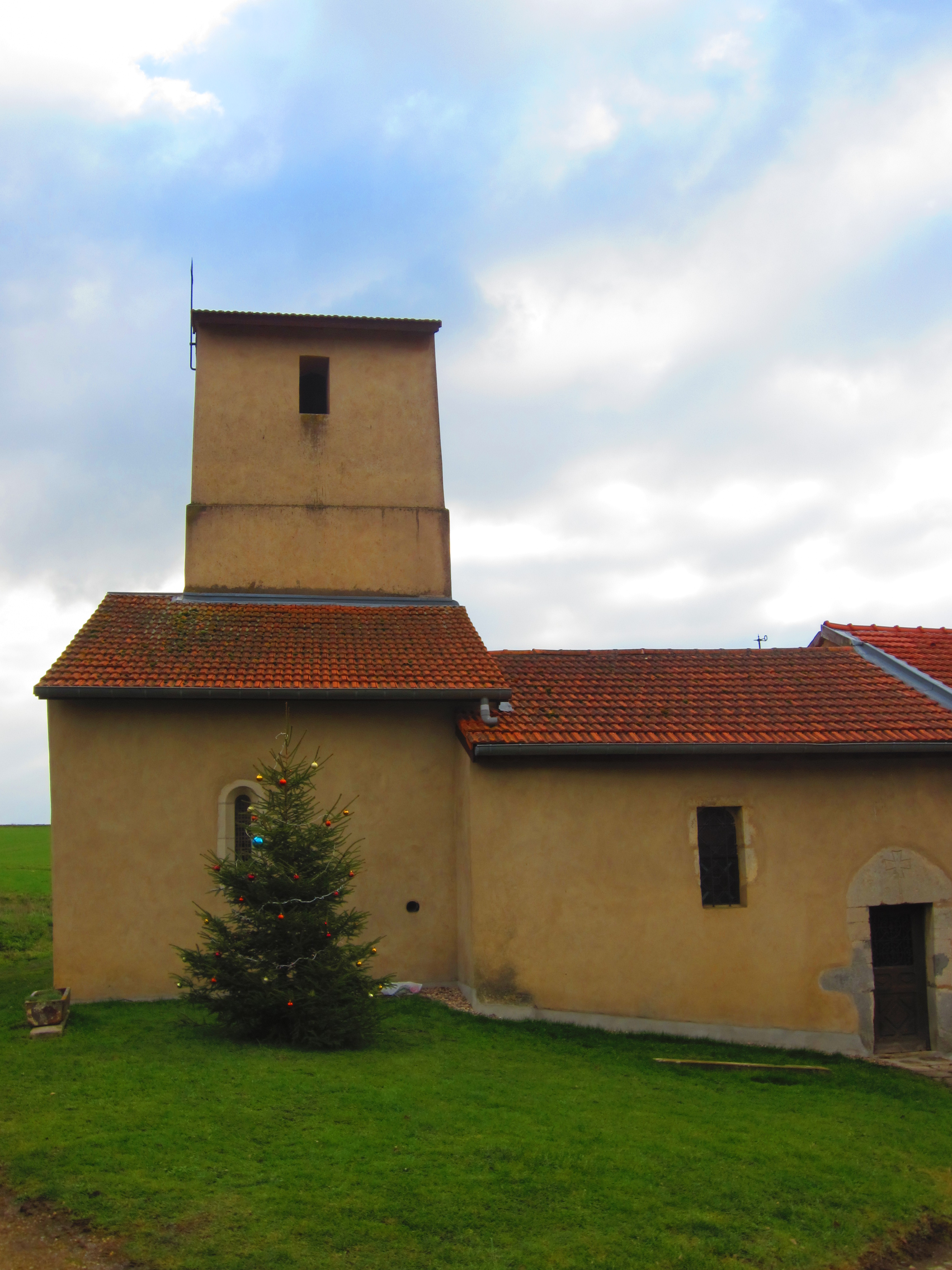
- The chapel in Vulmont

- Coat of arms
- Location of Vulmont
- Location within France Location within Grand Est
- Coordinates: 48°55′31″N 6°18′11″E
- Country: France
- Region: Grand Est
- Department: Moselle
- Arrondissement: Metz
- Canton: Le Saulnois
- Intercommunality: Sud Messin

Government
  - Mayor (2020–2026): Patrice Thiébaud
- Area^{1}: 3.09 km^{2} (1.19 sq mi)
- Elevation: 310 m (1,020 ft)
- Highest elevation: 297 m (974 ft)
- Lowest elevation: 206 m (676 ft)
- Population (2023): 31
  - Density: 10/km^{2} (26/sq mi)
- Time zone: UTC+01:00 (CET)
  - Summer (DST): UTC+02:00 (CEST)
- INSEE/Postal code: 57737 /57420
- ^{1} French Land Register data, which excludes lakes, ponds, glaciers > 1 km^{2} (0.386 sq mi or 247 acres) and river estuaries.

Vulmont (French pronunciation: [vylmɔ̃]; German: Wulberg) is a commune in the Moselle department in Grand Est in north-eastern France.

== Population ==
Historical population
Year	Pop.	±% p.a.
1968	24	—
1975	21	−1.89%
1982	21	+0.00%
1990	21	+0.00%
1999	38	+6.81%
2007	39	+0.33%
2012	42	+1.49%
2017	30	−6.51%
2023	31	+0.55%
Source: INSEE

== See also ==
- Communes of the Moselle department
