= Saint-Jure =

- Commune
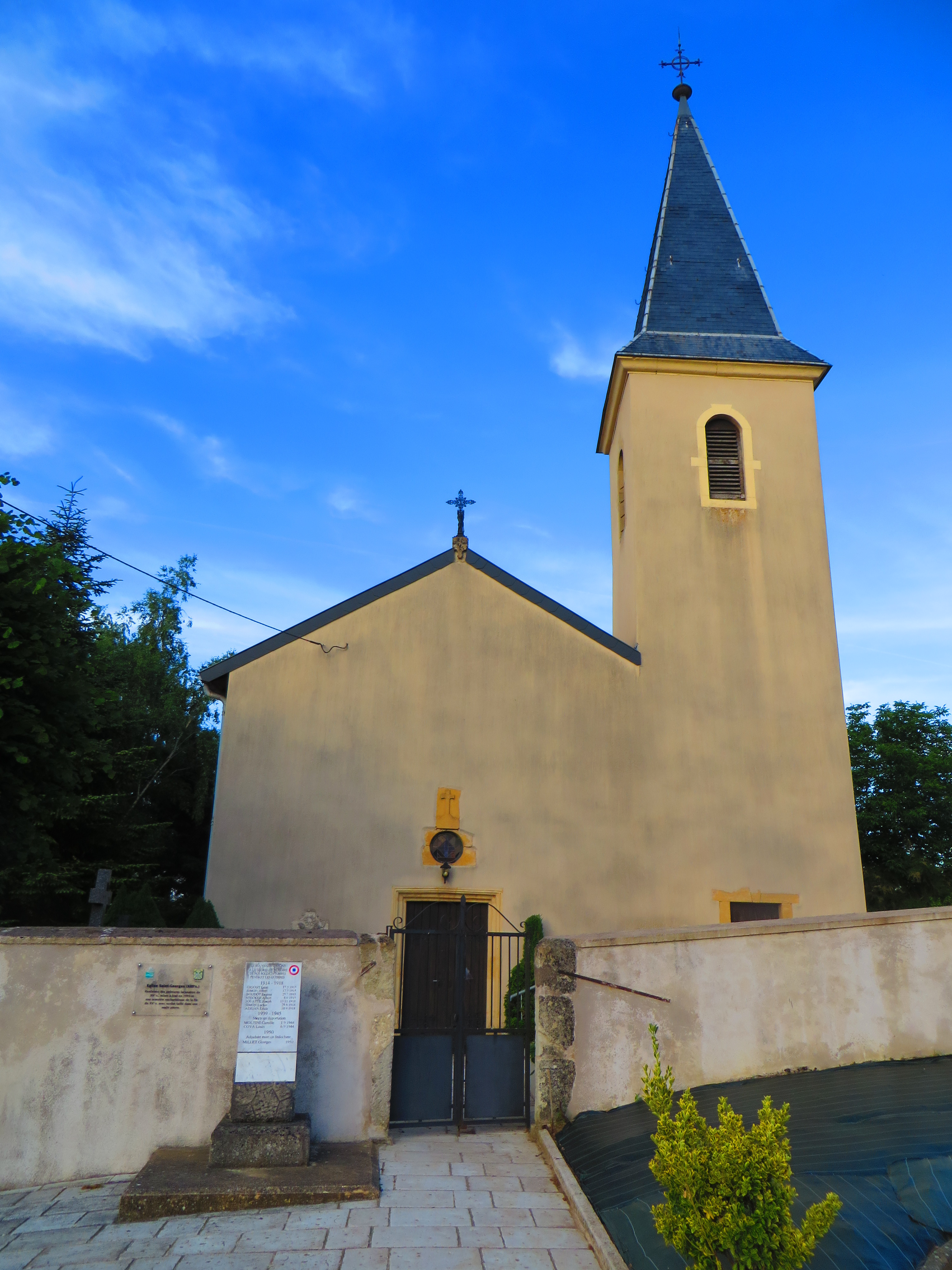
- The church in Saint-Jure

- Coat of arms
- Location of Saint-Jure
- Location within France Location within Grand Est
- Coordinates: 48°56′40″N 6°13′12″E
- Country: France
- Region: Grand Est
- Department: Moselle
- Arrondissement: Metz
- Canton: Le Saulnois

Government
  - Mayor (2020–2026): Angel Renaudin
- Area^{1}: 10.61 km^{2} (4.10 sq mi)
- Elevation: 230 m (750 ft)
- Highest elevation: 261 m (856 ft)
- Lowest elevation: 207 m (679 ft)
- Population (2023): 283
  - Density: 26.7/km^{2} (69.1/sq mi)
- Time zone: UTC+01:00 (CET)
  - Summer (DST): UTC+02:00 (CEST)
- INSEE/Postal code: 57617 /57420
- ^{1} French Land Register data, which excludes lakes, ponds, glaciers > 1 km^{2} (0.386 sq mi or 247 acres) and river estuaries.

Saint-Jure (French pronunciation: [sɛ̃ ʒyʁ]; German: Sankt Jürgen) is a commune in the Moselle department in Grand Est in north-eastern France.

== See also ==
- Communes of the Moselle department
