= Prévocourt =

- Commune
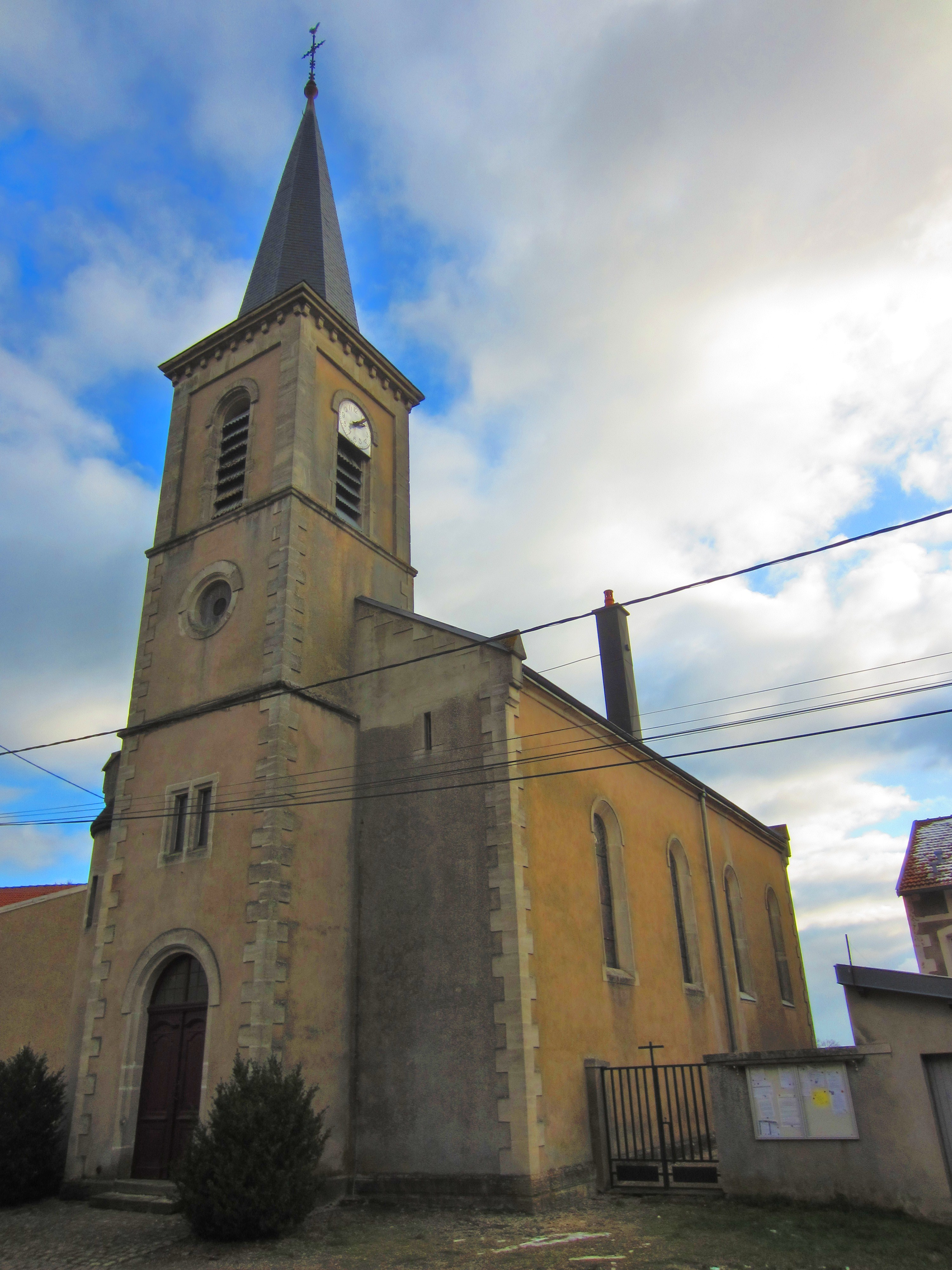
- The church in Prévocourt

- Coat of arms
- Location of Prévocourt
- Location within France Location within Grand Est
- Coordinates: 48°54′54″N 6°25′44″E
- Country: France
- Region: Grand Est
- Department: Moselle
- Arrondissement: Sarrebourg-Château-Salins
- Canton: Le Saulnois
- Intercommunality: CC Saulnois
- Area^{1}: 6.77 km^{2} (2.61 sq mi)
- Elevation: 320 m (1,050 ft)
- Highest elevation: 360 m (1,180 ft)
- Lowest elevation: 228 m (748 ft)
- Population (2023): 105
  - Density: 15.5/km^{2} (40.2/sq mi)
- Time zone: UTC+01:00 (CET)
  - Summer (DST): UTC+02:00 (CEST)
- INSEE/Postal code: 57555 /57590
- ^{1} French Land Register data, which excludes lakes, ponds, glaciers > 1 km^{2} (0.386 sq mi or 247 acres) and river estuaries.

Prévocourt (French pronunciation: [pʁevɔkuʁ]; German: Probsthofen) is a commune in the Moselle department in Grand Est in northeastern France.

== See also ==
- Communes of the Moselle department
