= Château-Salins =

- Commune
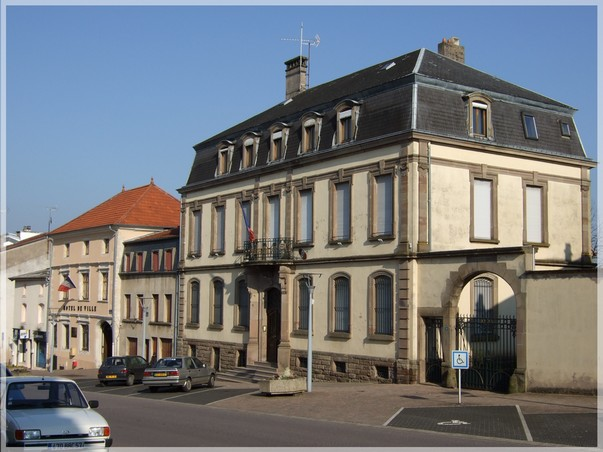
- Town hall

- Coat of arms
- Location of Château-Salins
- Location within France Location within Grand Est
- Coordinates: 48°49′18″N 6°30′33″E
- Country: France
- Region: Grand Est
- Department: Moselle
- Arrondissement: Sarrebourg-Château-Salins
- Canton: Le Saulnois
- Intercommunality: CC Saulnois

Government
  - Mayor (2020–2026): Gaëtan Benimeddourene
- Area^{1}: 10.76 km^{2} (4.15 sq mi)
- Population (2023): 2,296
  - Density: 213.4/km^{2} (552.7/sq mi)
- Time zone: UTC+01:00 (CET)
  - Summer (DST): UTC+02:00 (CEST)
- INSEE/Postal code: 57132 /57170
- ^{1} French Land Register data, which excludes lakes, ponds, glaciers > 1 km^{2} (0.386 sq mi or 247 acres) and river estuaries.

Château-Salins (French: [ʃɑto salɛ̃]; German: Salzburg, from 1941 to 1944 Salzburgen) is a commune in the Moselle department in Grand Est in north-eastern France. Until 2014, Château-Salins was a subprefecture of the Moselle department.

== History ==
The town is relatively recent. The territory on which the castle, and later the town, was built was part of the domains of the bishopric of Metz.

Legend has it that pilgrims on their way to Saint-Nicolas-de-Port discovered a salt spring. Around 1340, the regent Elisabeth of Austria, widow of Duke Ferry IV, had a castle built to protect the exploitation of this spring. To control the ducal building, Bishop Adhémar de Monteil also had a fortress built, which he named Beaupaire, at some distance from there.

== Population ==
Historical population
Year	Pop.	±% p.a.
1968	2,392	—
1975	2,479	+0.51%
1982	2,461	−0.10%
1990	2,437	−0.12%
1999	2,470	+0.15%
2007	2,552	+0.41%
2012	2,444	−0.86%
2017	2,464	+0.16%
2023	2,296	−1.17%
Source: INSEE

== See also ==
- Communes of the Moselle department
