= Juvelize =

- Commune
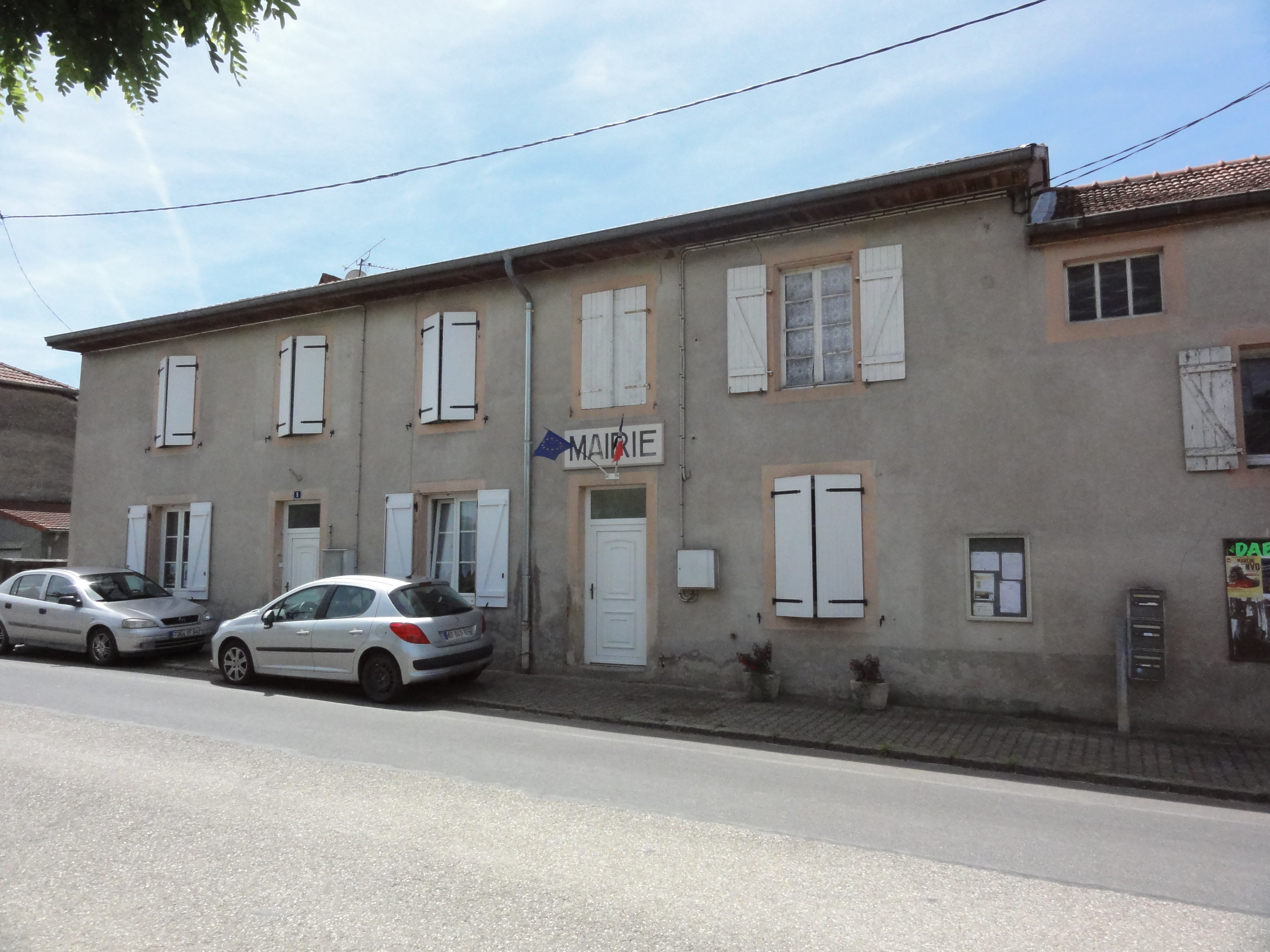
- The town hall in Juvelize

- Coat of arms
- Location of Juvelize
- Location within France Location within Grand Est
- Coordinates: 48°46′N 6°39′E
- Country: France
- Region: Grand Est
- Department: Moselle
- Arrondissement: Sarrebourg-Château-Salins
- Canton: Le Saulnois
- Intercommunality: CC du Saulnois

Government
  - Mayor (2020–2026): Sylvain Ciminera
- Area^{1}: 7.82 km^{2} (3.02 sq mi)
- Elevation: 250 m (820 ft)
- Highest elevation: 257 m (843 ft)
- Lowest elevation: 202 m (663 ft)
- Population (2023): 72
  - Density: 9.2/km^{2} (24/sq mi)
- Time zone: UTC+01:00 (CET)
  - Summer (DST): UTC+02:00 (CEST)
- INSEE/Postal code: 57353 /57170
- ^{1} French Land Register data, which excludes lakes, ponds, glaciers > 1 km^{2} (0.386 sq mi or 247 acres) and river estuaries.

Juvelize (French pronunciation: [ʒyvliz]; German: Geistkirch) is a commune in the Moselle department in Grand Est in north-eastern France.

== See also ==
- Communes of the Moselle department
- Parc naturel régional de Lorraine
