= Virming =

- Commune
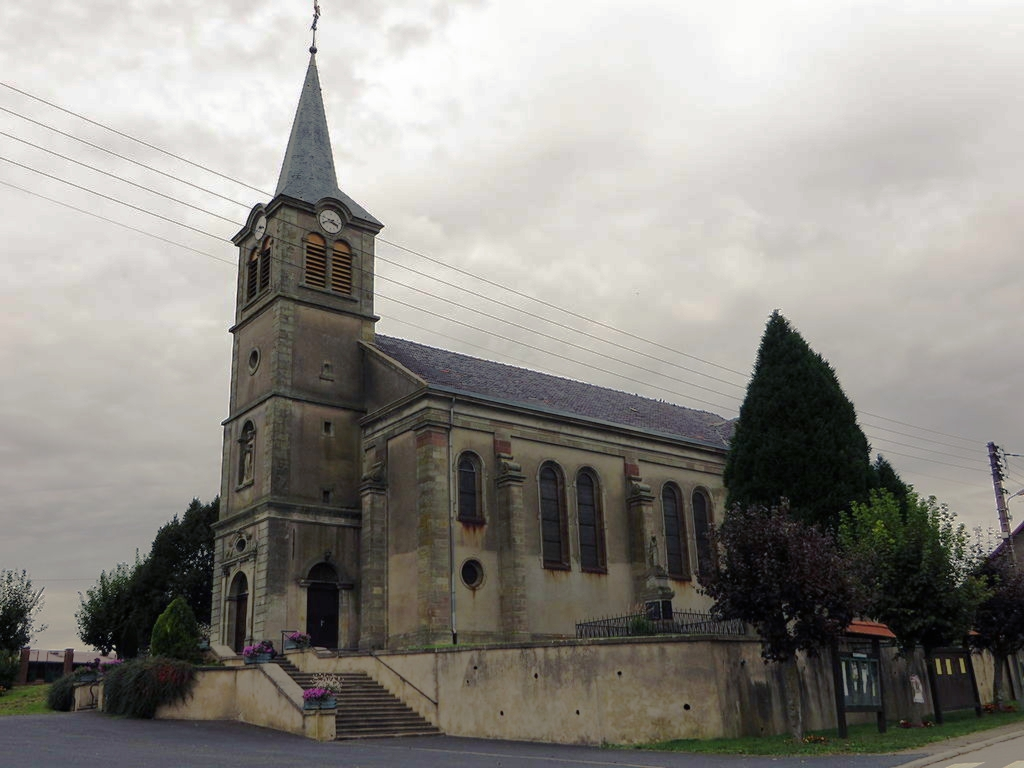
- The church in Virming

- Coat of arms
- Location of Virming
- Location within France Location within Grand Est
- Coordinates: 48°56′46″N 6°45′06″E
- Country: France
- Region: Grand Est
- Department: Moselle
- Arrondissement: Sarrebourg-Château-Salins
- Canton: Le Saulnois
- Intercommunality: CC du Saulnois

Government
  - Mayor (2020–2026): Yolande Houpert
- Area^{1}: 10.77 km^{2} (4.16 sq mi)
- Elevation: 215 m (705 ft)
- Highest elevation: 266 m (873 ft)
- Lowest elevation: 221 m (725 ft)
- Population (2023): 297
  - Density: 27.6/km^{2} (71.4/sq mi)
- Time zone: UTC+01:00 (CET)
  - Summer (DST): UTC+02:00 (CEST)
- INSEE/Postal code: 57723 /57340
- ^{1} French Land Register data, which excludes lakes, ponds, glaciers > 1 km^{2} (0.386 sq mi or 247 acres) and river estuaries.

Virming (French pronunciation: [viʁmɛ̃]; German: Wirmingen; Lorraine Franconian Wirminge) is a commune in the Moselle department in Grand Est in north-eastern France.

== History ==
Dependence of the ancient manor of Lorraine. Completely destroyed during the Thirty Years' War and resettled in 1656. The village was destroyed for 80% in 1944 and rebuilt in 1950.

== See also ==
- Communes of the Moselle department
