= Ommeray =

- Commune
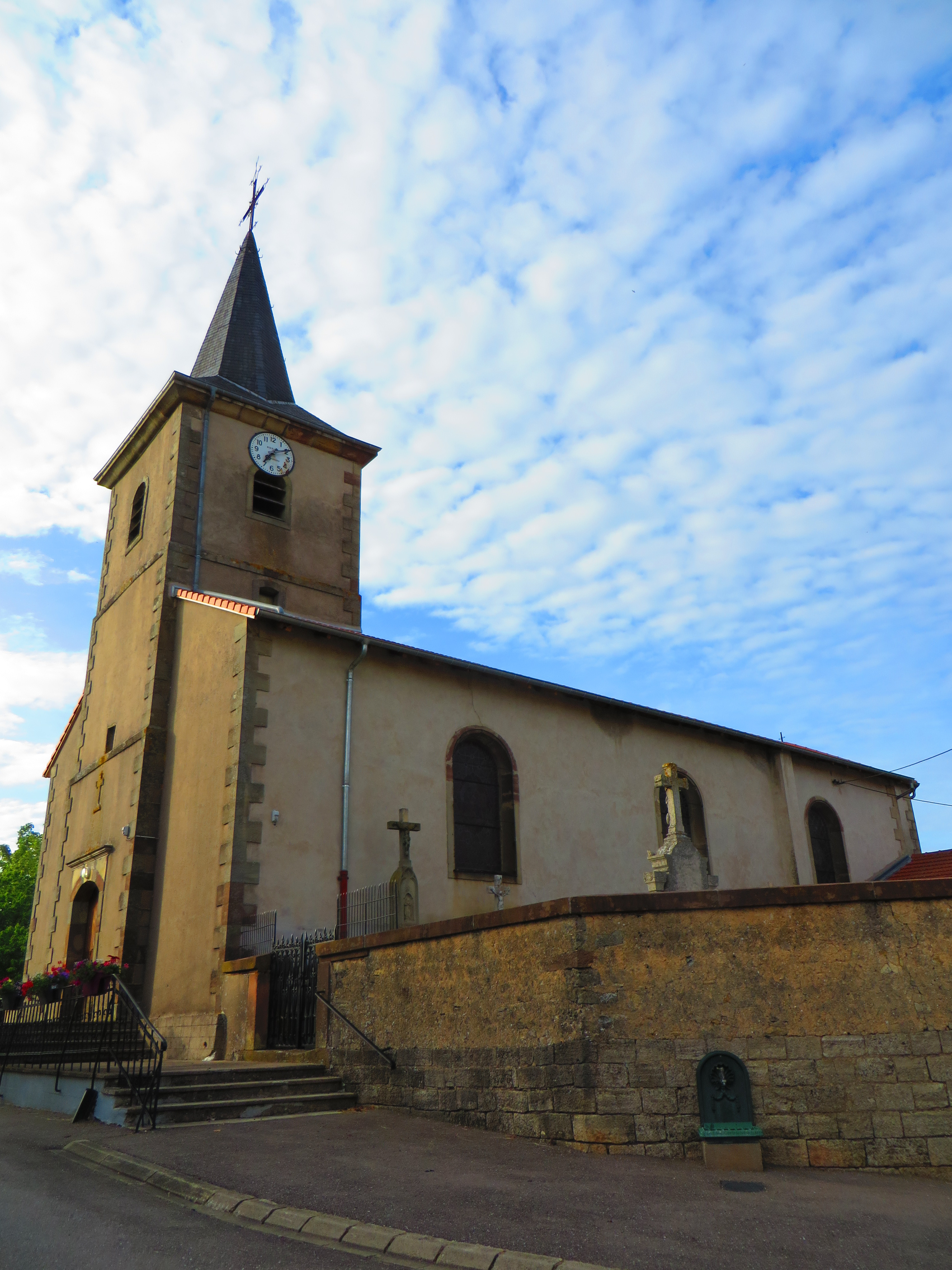
- The church in Ommeray

- Coat of arms
- Location of Ommeray
- Location within France Location within Grand Est
- Coordinates: 48°43′26″N 6°41′17″E
- Country: France
- Region: Grand Est
- Department: Moselle
- Arrondissement: Sarrebourg-Château-Salins
- Canton: Le Saulnois
- Intercommunality: CC du Saulnois

Government
  - Mayor (2020–2026): Sébastien Henry
- Area^{1}: 10.12 km^{2} (3.91 sq mi)
- Elevation: 225 m (738 ft)
- Highest elevation: 282 m (925 ft)
- Lowest elevation: 213 m (699 ft)
- Population (2023): 127
  - Density: 12.5/km^{2} (32.5/sq mi)
- Time zone: UTC+01:00 (CET)
  - Summer (DST): UTC+02:00 (CEST)
- INSEE/Postal code: 57524 /57810
- ^{1} French Land Register data, which excludes lakes, ponds, glaciers > 1 km^{2} (0.386 sq mi or 247 acres) and river estuaries.

Ommeray (French pronunciation: [ɔmʁɛ]; German: Ommerich) is a commune in the Moselle department in Grand Est in north-eastern France.

== See also ==
- Communes of the Moselle department
- Parc naturel régional de Lorraine
