= Vigny, Moselle =

Vigny
- Commune
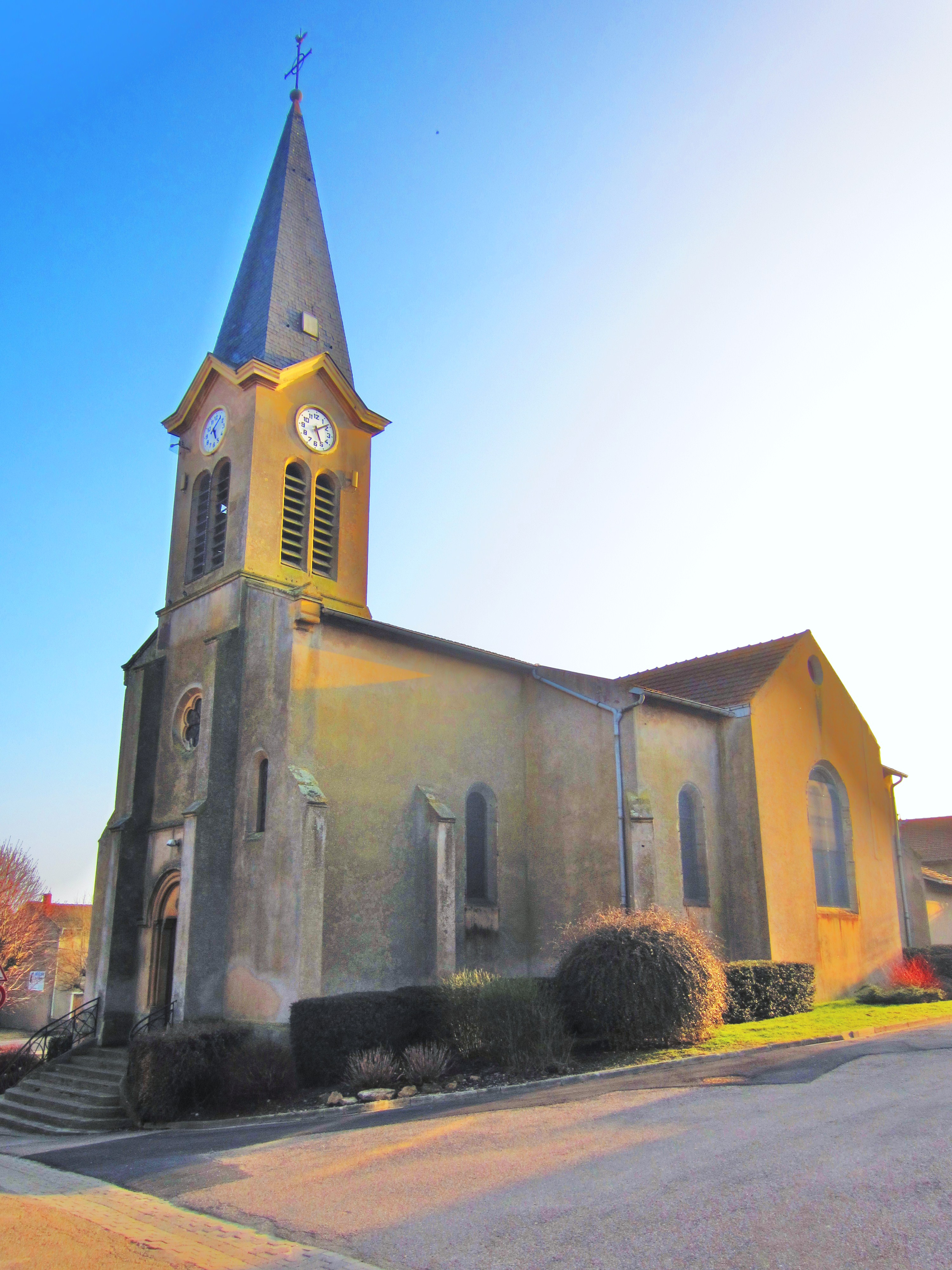
- The church in Vigny

- Coat of arms
- Location of Vigny
- Location within France Location within Grand Est
- Coordinates: 48°58′05″N 6°14′54″E
- Country: France
- Region: Grand Est
- Department: Moselle
- Arrondissement: Metz
- Canton: Le Saulnois
- Intercommunality: Sud Messin

Government
  - Mayor (2020–2026): Laurent Noel
- Area^{1}: 5.83 km^{2} (2.25 sq mi)
- Elevation: 297 m (974 ft)
- Highest elevation: 297 m (974 ft)
- Lowest elevation: 244 m (801 ft)
- Population (2023): 389
  - Density: 66.7/km^{2} (173/sq mi)
- Time zone: UTC+01:00 (CET)
  - Summer (DST): UTC+02:00 (CEST)
- INSEE/Postal code: 57715 /57420
- ^{1} French Land Register data, which excludes lakes, ponds, glaciers > 1 km^{2} (0.386 sq mi or 247 acres) and river estuaries.

Vigny (French pronunciation: [viɲi]; German: Wingert) is a commune in the Moselle department in Grand Est in north-eastern France.

== See also ==
- Communes of the Moselle department
