= Canton of Delme =

Coordinates: 48.9031°N 6.4236°E

Delme
- Former canton
- Location of the canton of Delme in the Arrondissement of Château-Salins
- Country: France
- Region: Grand Est
- Department: Moselle
- No. of communes: {{{nbcomm}}}
- Established: 1790
- Disbanded: 2015
- Area: 207.88 km^{2} (80.26 sq mi)
- Population (2012): 5,605
  - Density: 26.96/km^{2} (69.83/sq mi)

The canton of Delme is a former French administrative division located in the department of the Moselle and the Lorraine region. It was disbanded following the French canton reorganisation which came into effect in March 2015. Its communes became part of the new canton of Le Saulnois. It had 5,605 inhabitants (2012).

== Geography ==
This canton was organised around Delme in the arrondissement of Château-Salins. Its altitude varied between 187 m (Ajoncourt) and 401 m (Puzieux) for a medium altitude of 246 m.

The canton comprised the following communes:

- Ajoncourt
- Alaincourt-la-Côte
- Aulnois-sur-Seille
- Bacourt
- Baudrecourt
- Bréhain
- Château-Bréhain
- Chenois
- Chicourt
- Craincourt
- Delme
- Donjeux
- Fonteny
- Fossieux
- Frémery
- Hannocourt
- Jallaucourt
- Juville
- Laneuveville-en-Saulnois
- Lemoncourt
- Lesse
- Liocourt
- Lucy
- Malaucourt-sur-Seille
- Marthille
- Morville-sur-Nied
- Oriocourt
- Oron
- Prévocourt
- Puzieux
- Saint-Epvre
- Tincry
- Villers-sur-Nied
- Viviers
- Xocourt

== History ==
It was established as a canton of the former department of Meurthe. It was annexed in its entirety by Germany in 1871, in accordance with the treaty of Frankfurt. It was included into the department of the Moselle in 1918.

== Demography ==
Historical population

Year	Pop.	±%
1962	4,416	—
1968	4,843	+9.7%
1975	4,515	−6.8%
1982	4,450	−1.4%

Year	Pop.	±%
1990	4,477	+0.6%
1999	4,760	+6.3%
2012	5,605	+17.8%

From the year 1962 on: No double counting—residents of multiple communes (e.g. students and military personnel) are counted only once.
Source: INSEE et cassini

== See also ==
- Arrondissements of the Moselle department
- Communes of the Moselle department
