= Montdidier =

Montdidier may refer to:

- Montdidier, Moselle, Grand Est region, France
- Montdidier, Somme, Hauts-de-France region, France
