= Vahl-lès-Bénestroff =

- Commune
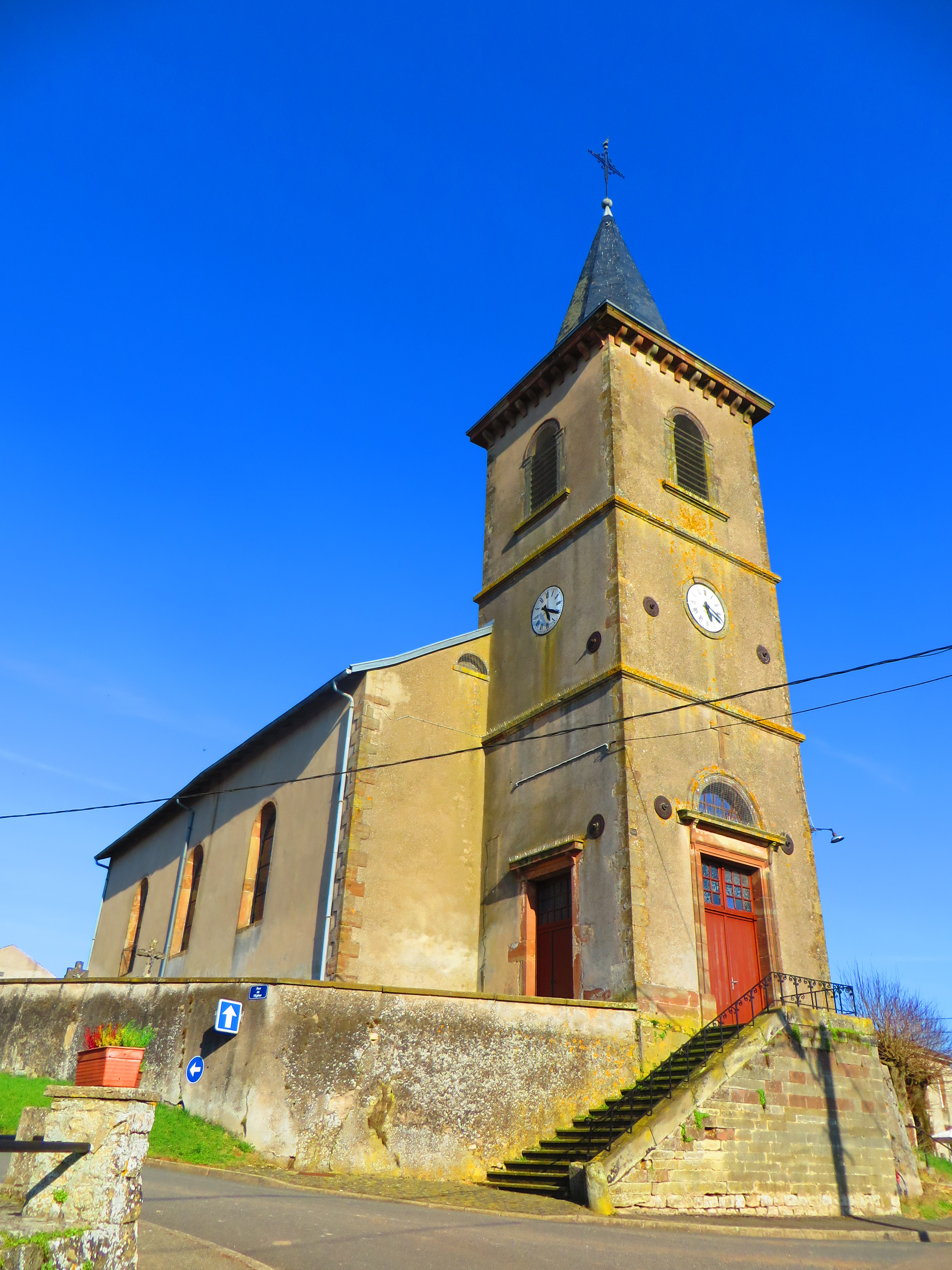
- The church in Vahl-lès-Bénestroff

- Coat of arms
- Location of Vahl-lès-Bénestroff
- Location within France Location within Grand Est
- Coordinates: 48°54′49″N 6°47′13″E
- Country: France
- Region: Grand Est
- Department: Moselle
- Arrondissement: Sarrebourg-Château-Salins
- Canton: Le Saulnois
- Intercommunality: CC du Saulnois

Government
  - Mayor (2020–2026): Fabrice Lallement
- Area^{1}: 8.97 km^{2} (3.46 sq mi)
- Elevation: 245 m (804 ft)
- Highest elevation: 284 m (932 ft)
- Lowest elevation: 220 m (720 ft)
- Population (2023): 140
  - Density: 16/km^{2} (40/sq mi)
- Time zone: UTC+01:00 (CET)
  - Summer (DST): UTC+02:00 (CEST)
- INSEE/Postal code: 57685 /57670
- ^{1} French Land Register data, which excludes lakes, ponds, glaciers > 1 km^{2} (0.386 sq mi or 247 acres) and river estuaries.

Vahl-lès-Bénestroff (French pronunciation: [val lɛ benɛstʁɔf], literally Vahl near Bénestroff; German: Wallen) is a commune in the Moselle department in Grand Est in north-eastern France.

== See also ==
- Communes of the Moselle department
