= Salonnes =

- Commune
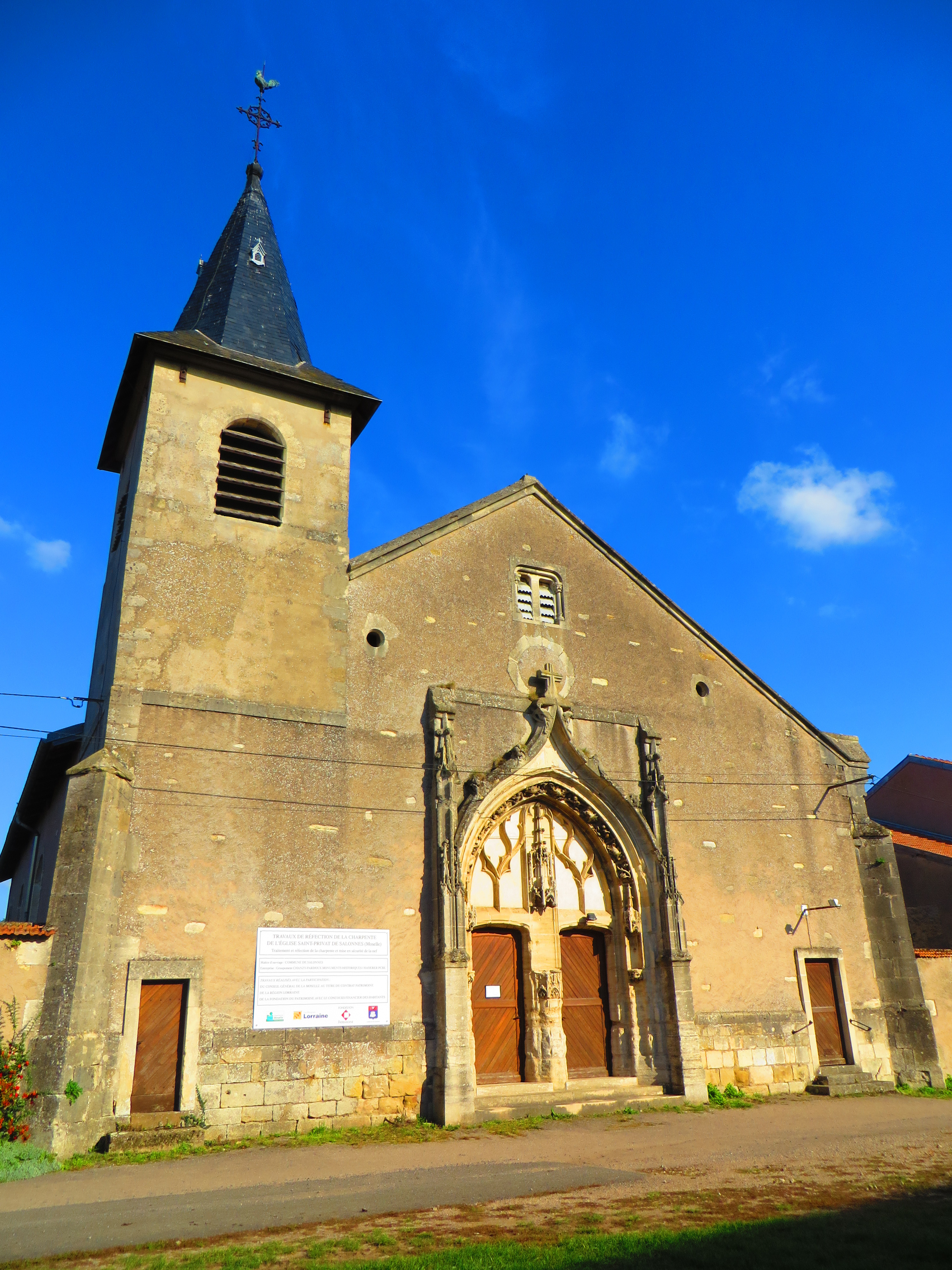
- The church in Salonnes

- Coat of arms
- Location of Salonnes
- Location within France Location within Grand Est
- Coordinates: 48°47′30″N 6°29′49″E
- Country: France
- Region: Grand Est
- Department: Moselle
- Arrondissement: Sarrebourg-Château-Salins
- Canton: Le Saulnois
- Intercommunality: CC du Saulnois

Government
  - Mayor (2020–2026): Jean-Pierre Broquard
- Area^{1}: 12.69 km^{2} (4.90 sq mi)
- Elevation: 215 m (705 ft)
- Highest elevation: 308 m (1,010 ft)
- Lowest elevation: 195 m (640 ft)
- Population (2023): 176
  - Density: 13.9/km^{2} (35.9/sq mi)
- Time zone: UTC+01:00 (CET)
  - Summer (DST): UTC+02:00 (CEST)
- INSEE/Postal code: 57625 /57170
- ^{1} French Land Register data, which excludes lakes, ponds, glaciers > 1 km^{2} (0.386 sq mi or 247 acres) and river estuaries.

Salonnes (French pronunciation: [salɔn]; German: Salzdorf) is a commune in the Moselle department in Grand Est in north-eastern France.

== See also ==
- Communes of the Moselle department
