= Héming =

- Commune
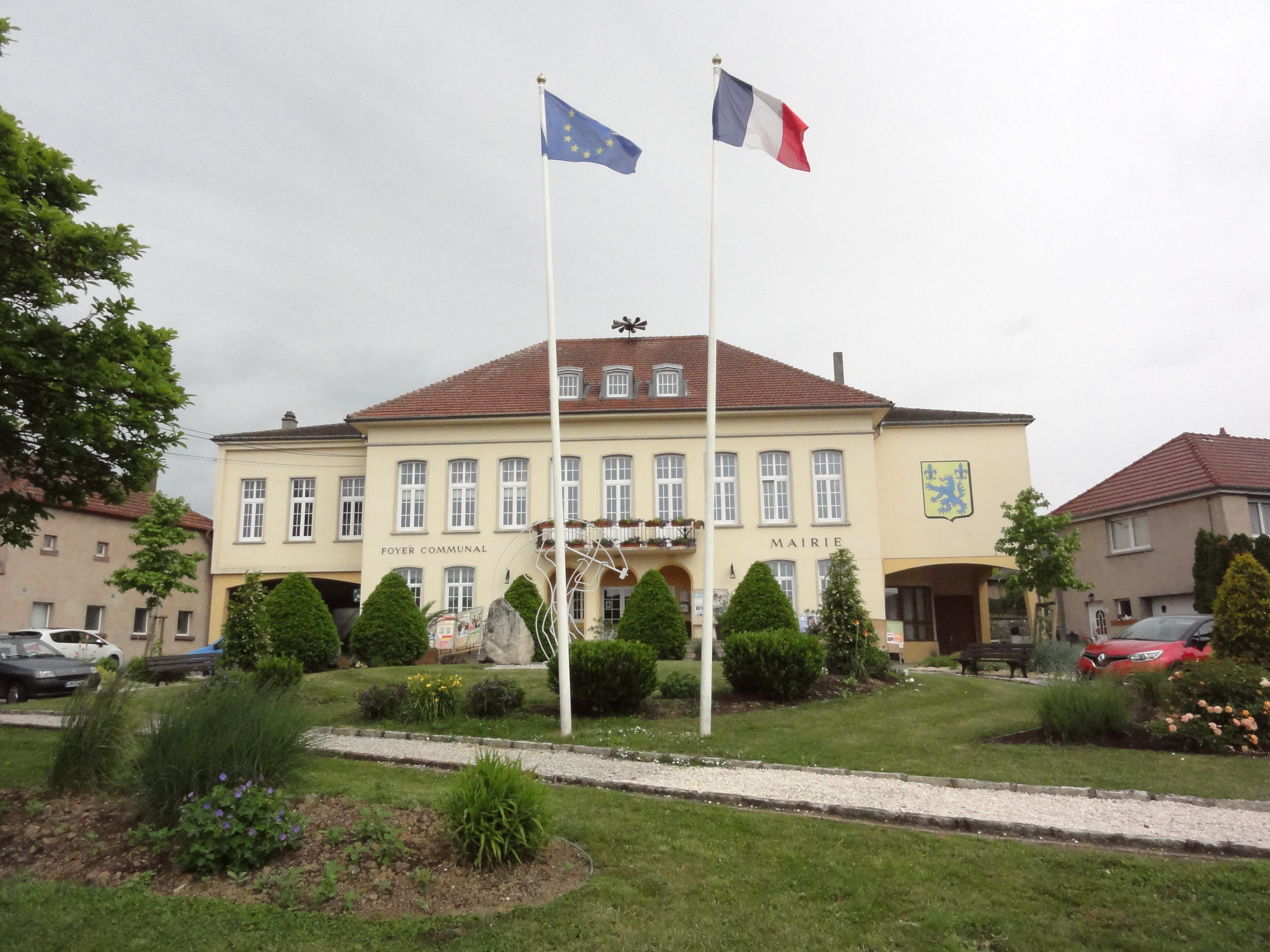
- The town hall in Héming

- Coat of arms
- Location of Héming
- Location within France Location within Grand Est
- Coordinates: 48°41′42″N 6°58′03″E
- Country: France
- Region: Grand Est
- Department: Moselle
- Arrondissement: Sarrebourg-Château-Salins
- Canton: Phalsbourg
- Intercommunality: Sarrebourg - Moselle Sud

Government
  - Mayor (2020–2026): Pascal Klein
- Area^{1}: 3.69 km^{2} (1.42 sq mi)
- Highest elevation: 322 m (1,056 ft)
- Lowest elevation: 255 m (837 ft)
- Population (2023): 490
  - Density: 130/km^{2} (340/sq mi)
- Time zone: UTC+01:00 (CET)
  - Summer (DST): UTC+02:00 (CEST)
- INSEE/Postal code: 57314 /57830
- ^{1} French Land Register data, which excludes lakes, ponds, glaciers > 1 km^{2} (0.386 sq mi or 247 acres) and river estuaries.

Héming (French pronunciation: [emɛ̃]; German: Heming) is a commune in the Moselle department in Grand Est in north-eastern France.

== See also ==
- Communes of the Moselle department
