= Turquestein-Blancrupt =

- Commune
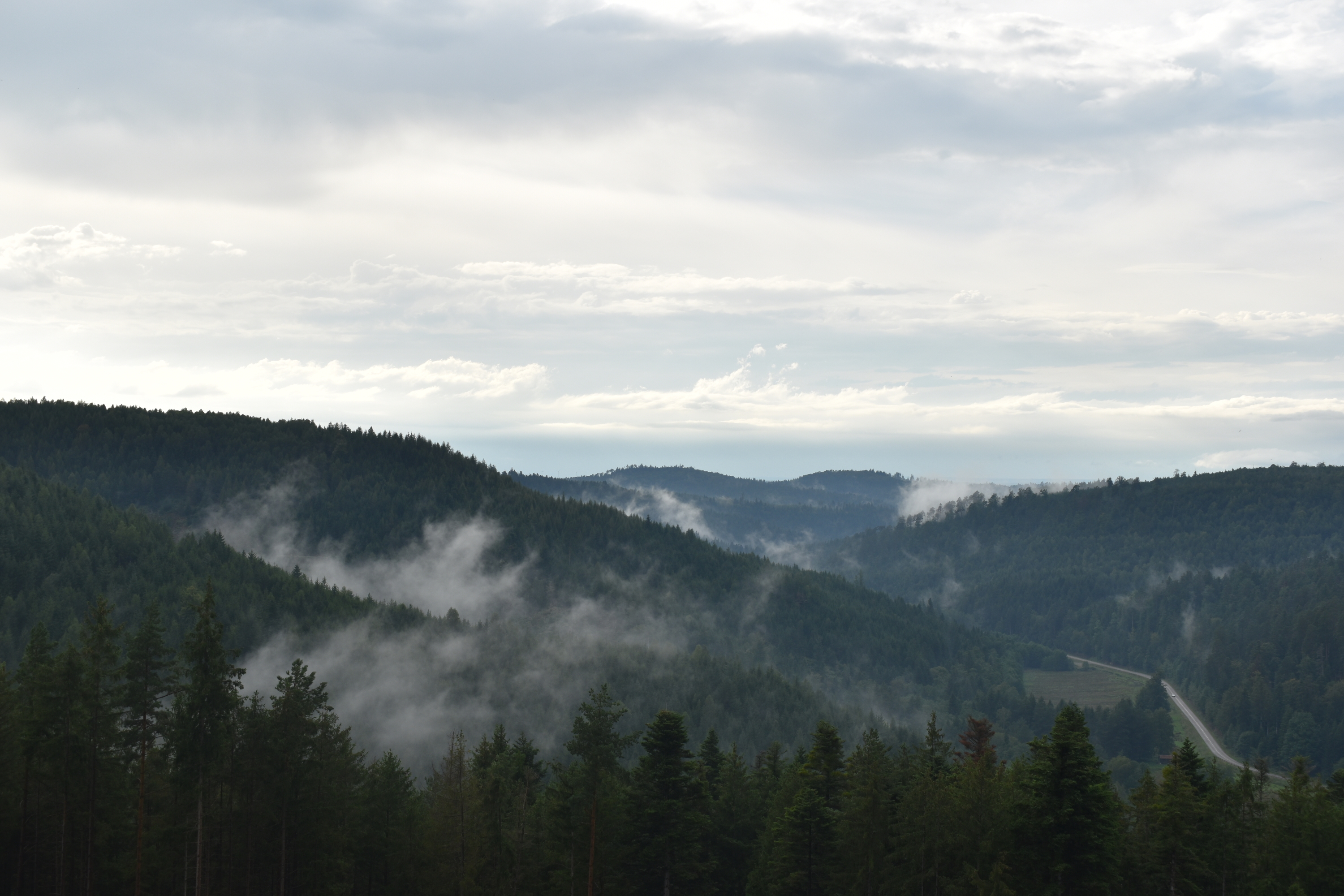
- Valley of Turquestein-Blancrupt

- Coat of arms
- Location of Turquestein-Blancrupt
- Location within France Location within Grand Est
- Coordinates: 48°34′12″N 7°05′51″E
- Country: France
- Region: Grand Est
- Department: Moselle
- Arrondissement: Sarrebourg-Château-Salins
- Canton: Phalsbourg
- Intercommunality: Sarrebourg - Moselle Sud

Government
  - Mayor (2020–2026): Michel André
- Area^{1}: 30.04 km^{2} (11.60 sq mi)
- Elevation: 450 m (1,480 ft)
- Highest elevation: 826 m (2,710 ft)
- Lowest elevation: 295 m (968 ft)
- Population (2023): 11
  - Density: 0.37/km^{2} (0.95/sq mi)
- Time zone: UTC+01:00 (CET)
  - Summer (DST): UTC+02:00 (CEST)
- INSEE/Postal code: 57682 /57560
- ^{1} French Land Register data, which excludes lakes, ponds, glaciers > 1 km^{2} (0.386 sq mi or 247 acres) and river estuaries.

Turquestein-Blancrupt (German: Türkstein-Kleinweißbach) is a commune in the Moselle department in Grand Est in north-eastern France.

== See also ==
- Communes of the Moselle department
