= Vannecourt =

- Commune
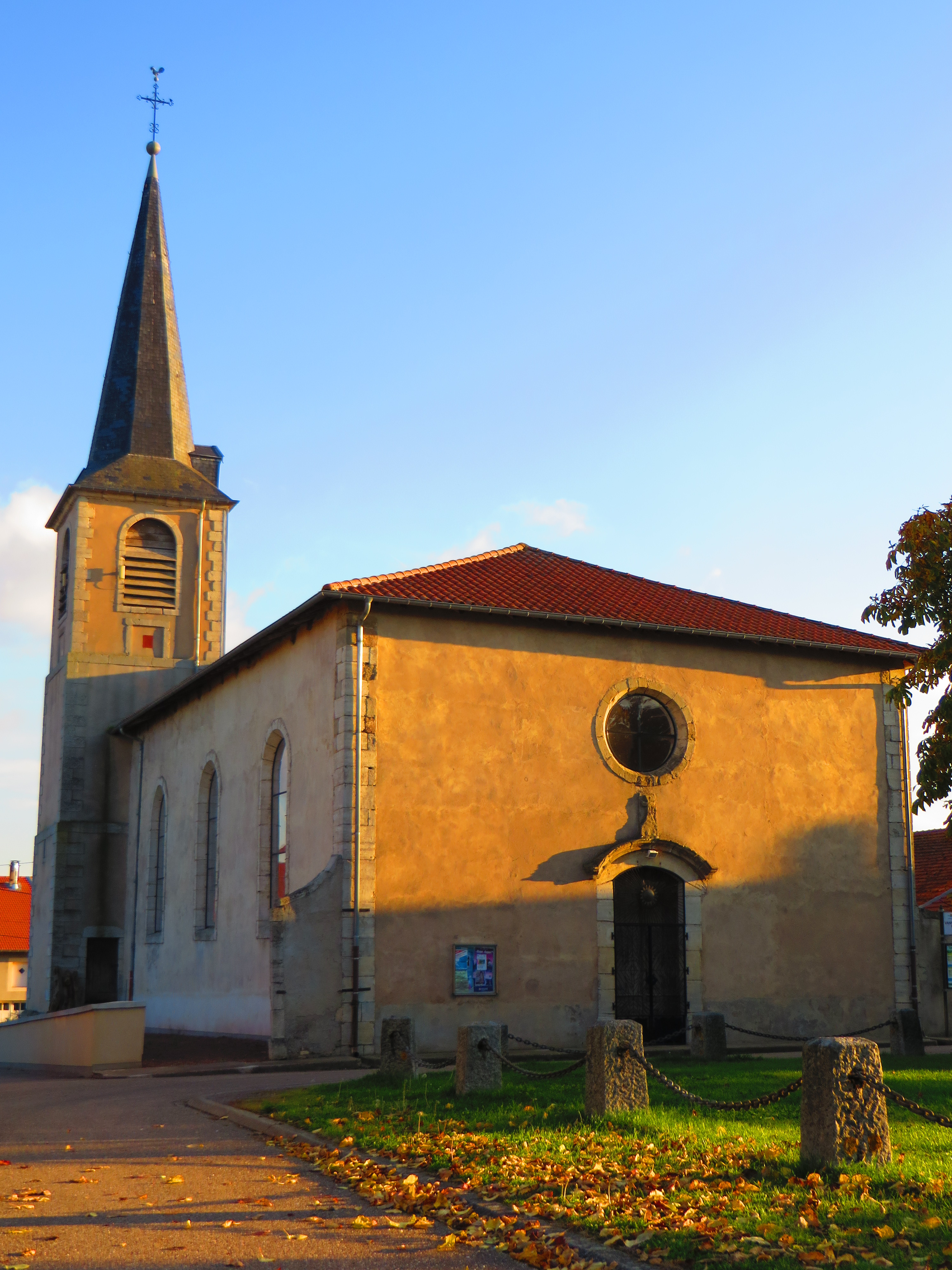
- The church in Vannecourt

- Coat of arms
- Location of Vannecourt
- Location within France Location within Grand Est
- Coordinates: 48°52′57″N 6°33′01″E
- Country: France
- Region: Grand Est
- Department: Moselle
- Arrondissement: Sarrebourg-Château-Salins
- Canton: Le Saulnois
- Intercommunality: CC du Saulnois

Government
  - Mayor (2020–2026): Michel Rambour
- Area^{1}: 9.55 km^{2} (3.69 sq mi)
- Elevation: 260 m (850 ft)
- Highest elevation: 336 m (1,102 ft)
- Lowest elevation: 213 m (699 ft)
- Population (2023): 67
  - Density: 7.0/km^{2} (18/sq mi)
- Time zone: UTC+01:00 (CET)
  - Summer (DST): UTC+02:00 (CEST)
- INSEE/Postal code: 57692 /57340
- ^{1} French Land Register data, which excludes lakes, ponds, glaciers > 1 km^{2} (0.386 sq mi or 247 acres) and river estuaries.

Vannecourt (French pronunciation: [vankuʁ]; German: Warnhofen) is a commune in the Moselle department in Grand Est in north-eastern France.

The parish church is dedicated to Saint Denis. It sites within the diocesan division of Château-Salins and the Diocese of Metz.

== See also ==
- Communes of the Moselle department
