= Brouviller =

- Commune
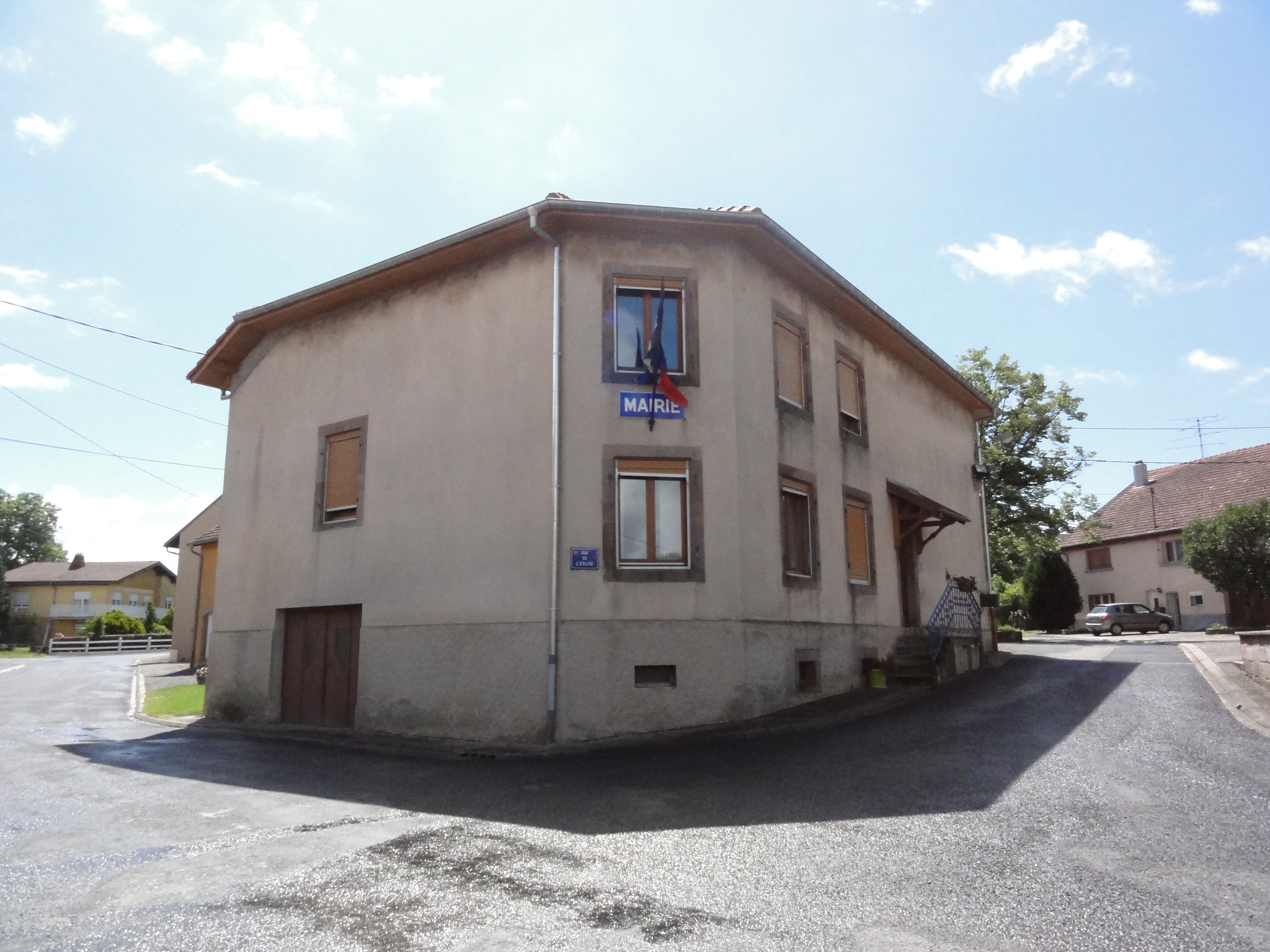
- The town hall in Brouviller

- Coat of arms
- Location of Brouviller
- Location within France Location within Grand Est
- Coordinates: 48°46′00″N 7°09′32″E
- Country: France
- Region: Grand Est
- Department: Moselle
- Arrondissement: Sarrebourg-Château-Salins
- Canton: Phalsbourg
- Intercommunality: Pays de Phalsbourg

Government
  - Mayor (2020–2026): Antoine Allard
- Area^{1}: 11.24 km^{2} (4.34 sq mi)
- Elevation: 330 m (1,080 ft)
- Highest elevation: 348 m (1,142 ft)
- Lowest elevation: 268 m (879 ft)
- Population (2023): 412
  - Density: 36.7/km^{2} (94.9/sq mi)
- Time zone: UTC+01:00 (CET)
  - Summer (DST): UTC+02:00 (CEST)
- INSEE/Postal code: 57114 /57635
- ^{1} French Land Register data, which excludes lakes, ponds, glaciers > 1 km^{2} (0.386 sq mi or 247 acres) and river estuaries.

Brouviller (French pronunciation: [bʁuvilɛʁ]; German: Brauweiler) is a commune in the Moselle department in Grand Est in northeastern France.

== History ==
The village, belonging to the principality of Lixheim, was reunited with France in 1661 by the Treaty of Vincennes.

In 2018, Brouviller’s oldest house was destroyed by a fire.

== Population ==
Historical population
Year	Pop.	±% p.a.
1968	400	—
1975	370	−1.11%
1982	354	−0.63%
1990	338	−0.58%
1999	389	+1.57%
2007	430	+1.26%
2012	431	+0.05%
2017	427	−0.19%
2023	412	−0.59%
Source: INSEE

== Cultural and historical heritage ==
Several Gallo-Roman remains are visible in the commune.

The church Saint-Rémi de Brouviller was built between 1781 and 1782. Three bells created in Nancy were installed in the bell tower in 1809 and replaced in 1922. A painting of Saint Remi, patron saint of the parish, is still in the church.

== Notable people linked to the village ==
According to Jean-Louis Beaucarnot’s book named Le Dico des politiques, Hillary Clinton had ancestors from Brouviller.

== See also ==
- Communes of the Moselle department
