= Arrondissement of Sarrebourg-Château-Salins =

Coordinates: 49.1°N 6.7°E

Sarrebourg-Château-Salins
- Arrondissement
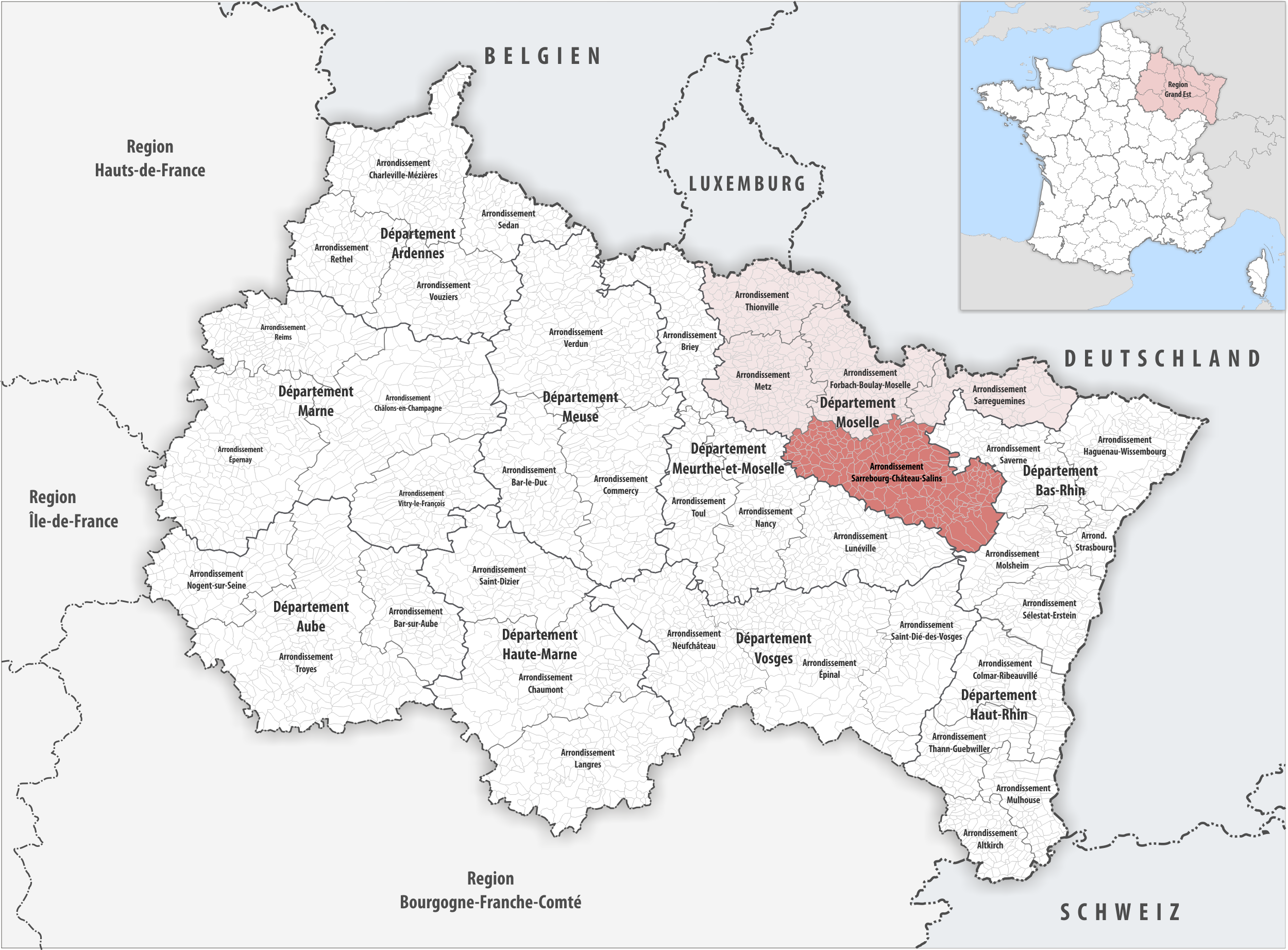
- Location within the region Grand Est
- Country: France
- Region: Grand Est
- Department: Moselle
- No. of communes: {{{nbcomm}}}
- Area: 1,966.9 km^{2} (759.4 sq mi)
- Population (2023): 90,033
  - Density: 45.774/km^{2} (118.55/sq mi)
- INSEE code: 575

The arrondissement of Sarrebourg-Château-Salins is an arrondissement of France in the Moselle department in the Grand Est region. It has 230 communes. Its population is 90,770 (2021), and its area is 1,966.9 km^{2} (759.4 sq mi).

== Composition ==
The communes of the arrondissement of Sarrebourg-Château-Salins are:

1. Aboncourt-sur-Seille
2. Abreschviller
3. Achain
4. Ajoncourt
5. Alaincourt-la-Côte
6. Albestroff
7. Amelécourt
8. Arzviller
9. Aspach
10. Assenoncourt
11. Attilloncourt
12. Aulnois-sur-Seille
13. Avricourt
14. Azoudange
15. Bacourt
16. Barchain
17. Bassing
18. Baudrecourt
19. Bébing
20. Bellange
21. Belles-Forêts
22. Bénestroff
23. Berling
24. Bermering
25. Berthelming
26. Bettborn
27. Bezange-la-Petite
28. Bickenholtz
29. Bidestroff
30. Bioncourt
31. Blanche-Église
32. Bourdonnay
33. Bourgaltroff
34. Bourscheid
35. Bréhain
36. Brouderdorff
37. Brouviller
38. Buhl-Lorraine
39. Burlioncourt
40. Chambrey
41. Château-Bréhain
42. Château-Salins
43. Château-Voué
44. Chenois
45. Chicourt
46. Conthil
47. Craincourt
48. Cutting
49. Dabo
50. Dalhain
51. Danne-et-Quatre-Vents
52. Dannelbourg
53. Delme
54. Desseling
55. Diane-Capelle
56. Dieuze
57. Dolving
58. Domnom-lès-Dieuze
59. Donjeux
60. Donnelay
61. Fénétrange
62. Fleisheim
63. Fonteny
64. Fossieux
65. Foulcrey
66. Francaltroff
67. Fraquelfing
68. Frémery
69. Fresnes-en-Saulnois
70. Fribourg
71. Garrebourg
72. Gelucourt
73. Gerbécourt
74. Givrycourt
75. Gondrexange
76. Gosselming
77. Grémecey
78. Guébestroff
79. Guéblange-lès-Dieuze
80. Guébling
81. Guermange
82. Guinzeling
83. Guntzviller
84. Haboudange
85. Hampont
86. Hangviller
87. Hannocourt
88. Haraucourt-sur-Seille
89. Harreberg
90. Hartzviller
91. Haselbourg
92. Hattigny
93. Haut-Clocher
94. Hellering-lès-Fénétrange
95. Héming
96. Henridorff
97. Hérange
98. Hermelange
99. Hertzing
100. Hesse
101. Hilbesheim
102. Hommarting
103. Hommert
104. Honskirch
105. Hultehouse
106. Ibigny
107. Imling
108. Insming
109. Insviller
110. Jallaucourt
111. Juvelize
112. Juville
113. Kerprich-aux-Bois
114. Lafrimbolle
115. Lagarde
116. Landange
117. Laneuveville-en-Saulnois
118. Laneuveville-lès-Lorquin
119. Langatte
120. Languimberg
121. Lemoncourt
122. Léning
123. Lesse
124. Ley
125. Lezey
126. Lhor
127. Lidrezing
128. Lindre-Basse
129. Lindre-Haute
130. Liocourt
131. Lixheim
132. Lorquin
133. Lostroff
134. Loudrefing
135. Lubécourt
136. Lucy
137. Lutzelbourg
138. Maizières-lès-Vic
139. Malaucourt-sur-Seille
140. Manhoué
141. Marimont-lès-Bénestroff
142. Marsal
143. Marthille
144. Métairies-Saint-Quirin
145. Metting
146. Mittelbronn
147. Mittersheim
148. Molring
149. Moncourt
150. Montdidier
151. Morville-lès-Vic
152. Morville-sur-Nied
153. Moussey
154. Moyenvic
155. Mulcey
156. Munster
157. Nébing
158. Neufmoulins
159. Neufvillage
160. Niderhoff
161. Niderviller
162. Niederstinzel
163. Nitting
164. Oberstinzel
165. Obreck
166. Ommeray
167. Oriocourt
168. Oron
169. Pettoncourt
170. Pévange
171. Phalsbourg
172. Plaine-de-Walsch
173. Postroff
174. Prévocourt
175. Puttigny
176. Puzieux
177. Réchicourt-le-Château
178. Réding
179. Réning
180. Rhodes
181. Riche
182. Richeval
183. Rodalbe
184. Romelfing
185. Rorbach-lès-Dieuze
186. Saint-Epvre
187. Saint-Georges
188. Saint-Jean-de-Bassel
189. Saint-Jean-Kourtzerode
190. Saint-Louis
191. Saint-Médard
192. Saint-Quirin
193. Salonnes
194. Sarraltroff
195. Sarrebourg
196. Schalbach
197. Schneckenbusch
198. Sotzeling
199. Tarquimpol
200. Tincry
201. Torcheville
202. Troisfontaines
203. Turquestein-Blancrupt
204. Vahl-lès-Bénestroff
205. Val-de-Bride
206. Vannecourt
207. Vasperviller
208. Vaxy
209. Veckersviller
210. Vergaville
211. Vescheim
212. Vibersviller
213. Vic-sur-Seille
214. Vieux-Lixheim
215. Villers-sur-Nied
216. Vilsberg
217. Virming
218. Vittersbourg
219. Viviers
220. Voyer
221. Walscheid
222. Waltembourg
223. Wintersbourg
224. Wuisse
225. Xanrey
226. Xocourt
227. Xouaxange
228. Zarbeling
229. Zilling
230. Zommange

== History ==
The arrondissement of Sarrebourg-Château-Salins was created in January 2016 by the merger of the former arrondissements of Sarrebourg and Château-Salins.
