= Saint-Jean-Kourtzerode =

- Commune
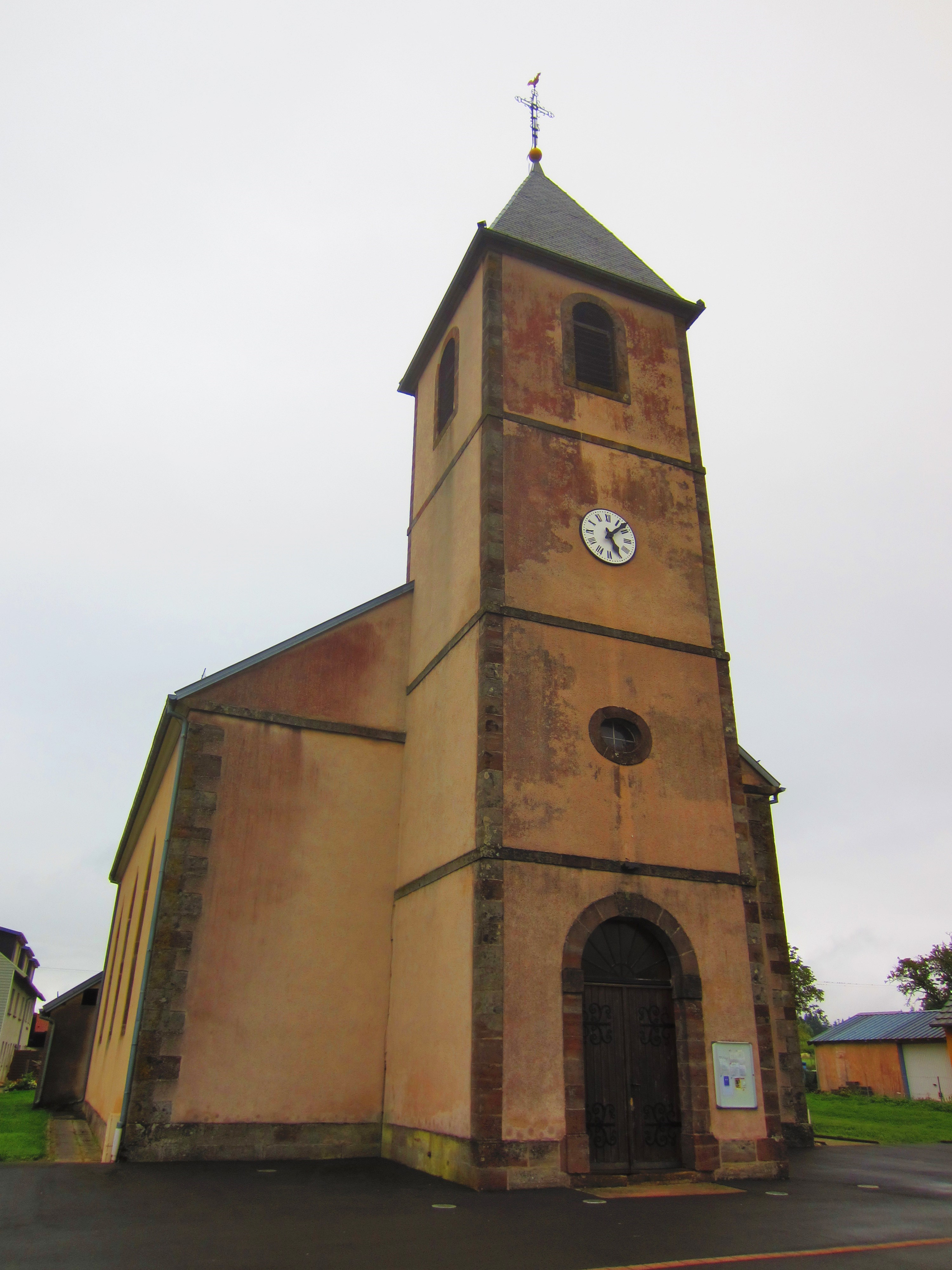
- The church in Saint-Jean-Kourtzerode

- Coat of arms
- Location of Saint-Jean-Kourtzerode
- Location within France Location within Grand Est
- Coordinates: 48°45′27″N 7°11′36″E
- Country: France
- Region: Grand Est
- Department: Moselle
- Arrondissement: Sarrebourg-Château-Salins
- Canton: Phalsbourg

Government
  - Mayor (2020–2026): Gérard Pfeiffer
- Area^{1}: 1.58 km^{2} (0.61 sq mi)
- Elevation: 340 m (1,120 ft)
- Highest elevation: 338 m (1,109 ft)
- Lowest elevation: 270 m (890 ft)
- Population (2023): 647
  - Density: 409/km^{2} (1,060/sq mi)
- Time zone: UTC+01:00 (CET)
  - Summer (DST): UTC+02:00 (CEST)
- INSEE/Postal code: 57614 /57370
- ^{1} French Land Register data, which excludes lakes, ponds, glaciers > 1 km^{2} (0.386 sq mi or 247 acres) and river estuaries.

Saint-Jean-Kourtzerode (French pronunciation: [sɛ̃ ʒɑ̃ kuʁtsəʁɔd]; German: Sankt Johann-Kurzerode) is a commune in the Moselle department in Grand Est in north-eastern France.

== History ==
This village was part of the principality of Phalsbourg. It had just six houses in 1756.

The hamlet of Kourtzerode (meaning "small quarries") dates back to the 14th century. Saint-Jean was not built until the early 18th century.

The town's history was marked by the construction of an American military air base after the Second World War. Taken over by the French army, the La Horie district is now occupied by the 1st Combat Helicopter Regiment.

== See also ==
- Communes of the Moselle department
