= Hartzviller =

- Commune
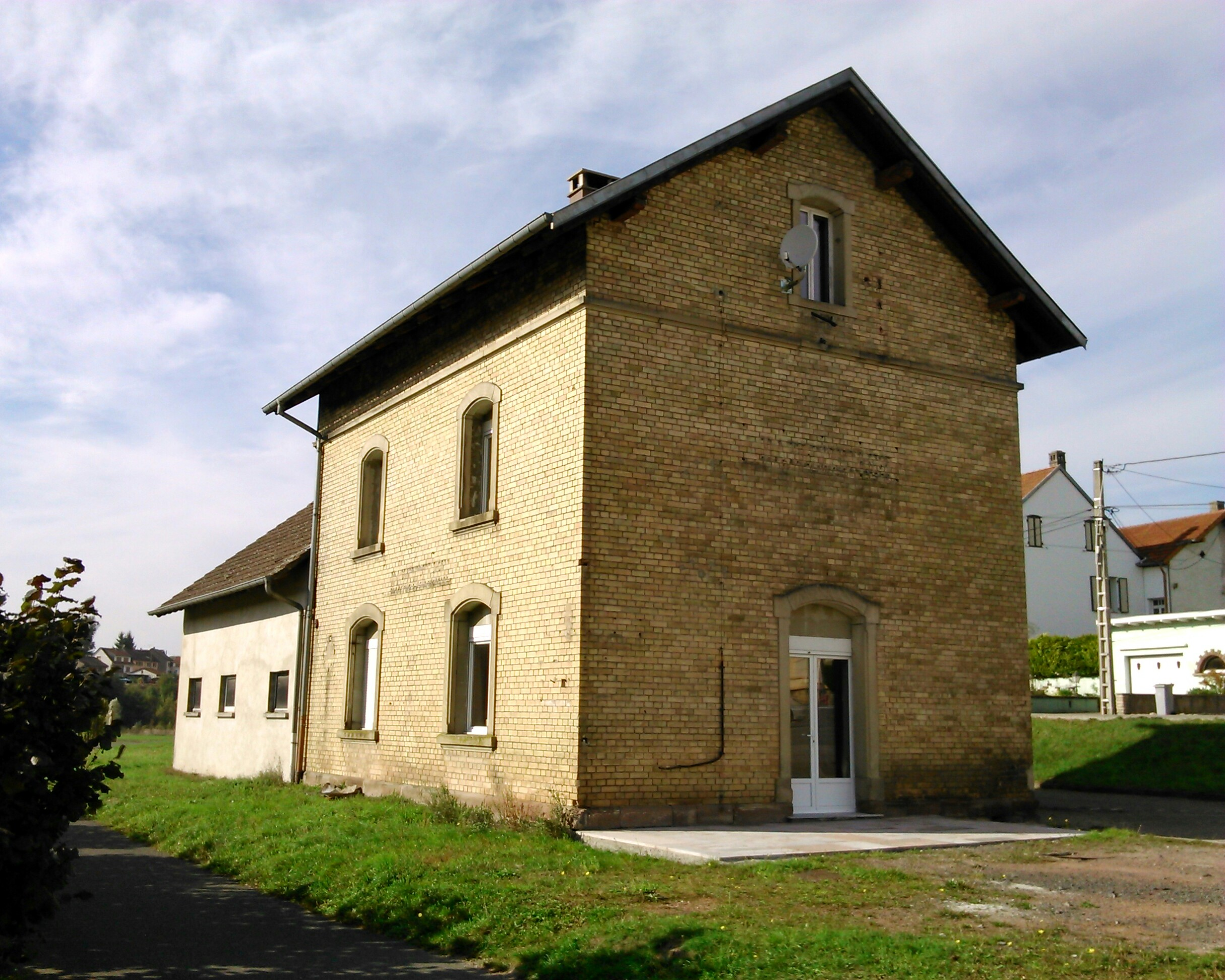
- The old railway station in Hartzviller

- Coat of arms
- Location of Hartzviller
- Location within France Location within Grand Est
- Coordinates: 48°40′13″N 7°05′14″E
- Country: France
- Region: Grand Est
- Department: Moselle
- Arrondissement: Sarrebourg-Château-Salins
- Canton: Phalsbourg
- Intercommunality: CC Sarrebourg Moselle Sud

Government
  - Mayor (2020–2026): Laurent Chevrier
- Area^{1}: 4.14 km^{2} (1.60 sq mi)
- Elevation: 300 m (980 ft)
- Highest elevation: 376 m (1,234 ft)
- Lowest elevation: 275 m (902 ft)
- Population (2023): 934
  - Density: 226/km^{2} (584/sq mi)
- Time zone: UTC+01:00 (CET)
  - Summer (DST): UTC+02:00 (CEST)
- INSEE/Postal code: 57299 /57870
- ^{1} French Land Register data, which excludes lakes, ponds, glaciers > 1 km^{2} (0.386 sq mi or 247 acres) and river estuaries.

Hartzviller (German: Harzweiler) is a commune in the Moselle department in Grand Est in north-eastern France.

== Geography ==
It is located about ten kilometres south of Sarrebourg. It has less than 1,000 inhabitants since the beginning of the 21st century but forms a small agglomeration with the communes of Troisfontaines and Walscheid, frequently referred to as the "Bièvre Valley", with 4,000 inhabitants.

This commune is located in the historic region of Lorraine.

The Bièvre river crosses the village.

The Hartzviller train station is nowadays closed.

== See also ==
- Communes of the Moselle department
