= Alaincourt-la-Côte =

- Commune
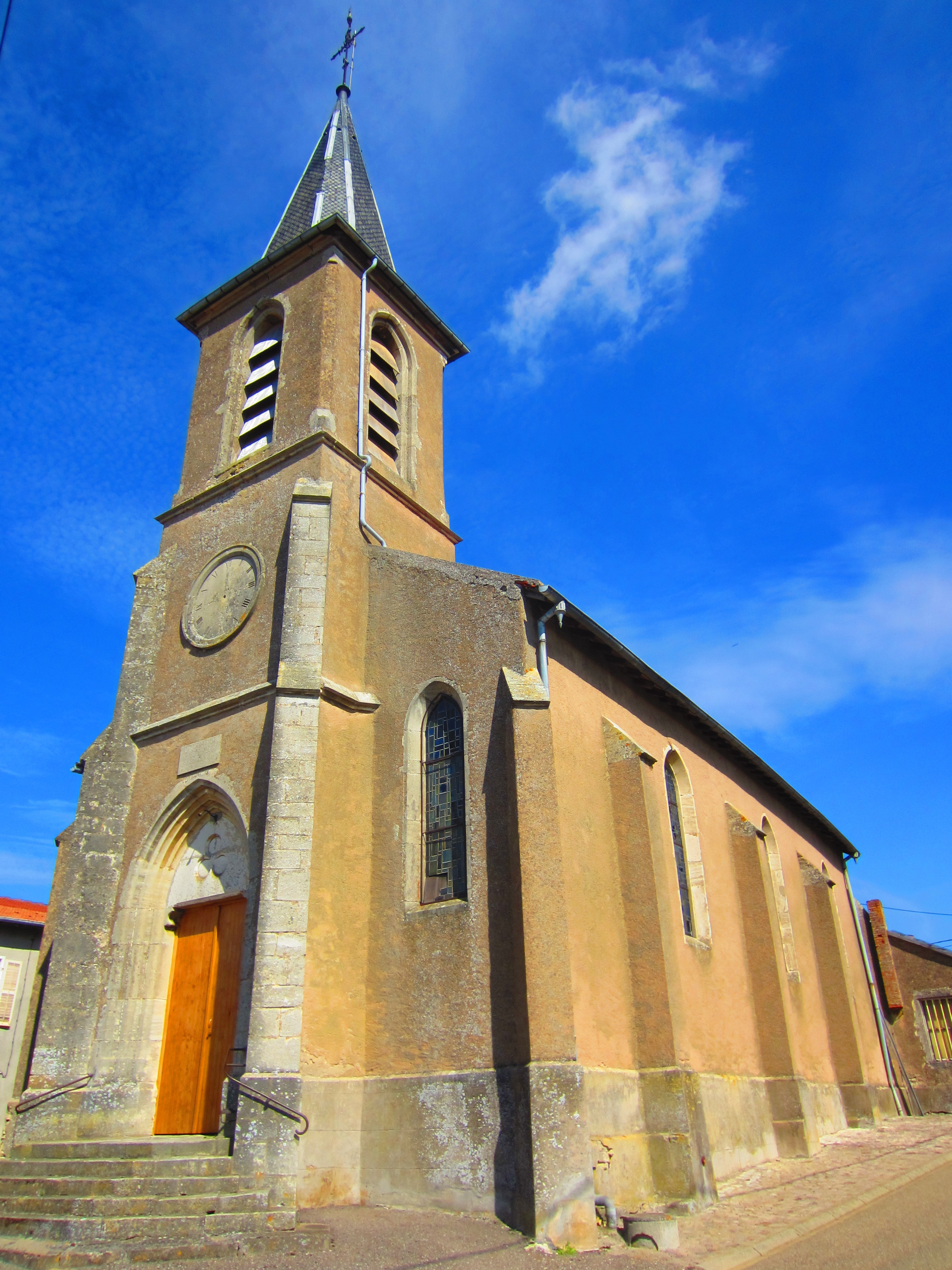
- The church in Alaincourt-la-Côte

- Coat of arms
- Location of Alaincourt-la-Côte
- Location within France Location within Grand Est
- Coordinates: 48°53′56″N 6°20′32″E
- Country: France
- Region: Grand Est
- Department: Moselle
- Arrondissement: Sarrebourg-Château-Salins
- Canton: Le Saulnois
- Intercommunality: Saulnois

Government
  - Mayor (2020–2026): Bernard Doyen
- Area^{1}: 4.17 km^{2} (1.61 sq mi)
- Highest elevation: 399 m (1,309 ft)
- Lowest elevation: 195 m (640 ft)
- Population (2023): 158
  - Density: 37.9/km^{2} (98.1/sq mi)
- Time zone: UTC+01:00 (CET)
  - Summer (DST): UTC+02:00 (CEST)
- INSEE/Postal code: 57010 /57590
- ^{1} French Land Register data, which excludes lakes, ponds, glaciers > 1 km^{2} (0.386 sq mi or 247 acres) and river estuaries.

Alaincourt-la-Côte (French pronunciation: [alɛ̃kuʁ la kot]; German: Allenhofen) is a commune in the Moselle department in Grand Est in northeastern France.

== Population ==
Historical population
Year	Pop.	±% p.a.
1968	110	—
1975	82	−4.11%
1982	85	+0.51%
1990	82	−0.45%
1999	91	+1.16%
2007	128	+4.36%
2012	136	+1.22%
2017	149	+1.84%
2023	176	+2.81%
Source: INSEE

== See also ==
- Communes of the Moselle department
