= Viviers, Moselle =

Viviers
- Commune
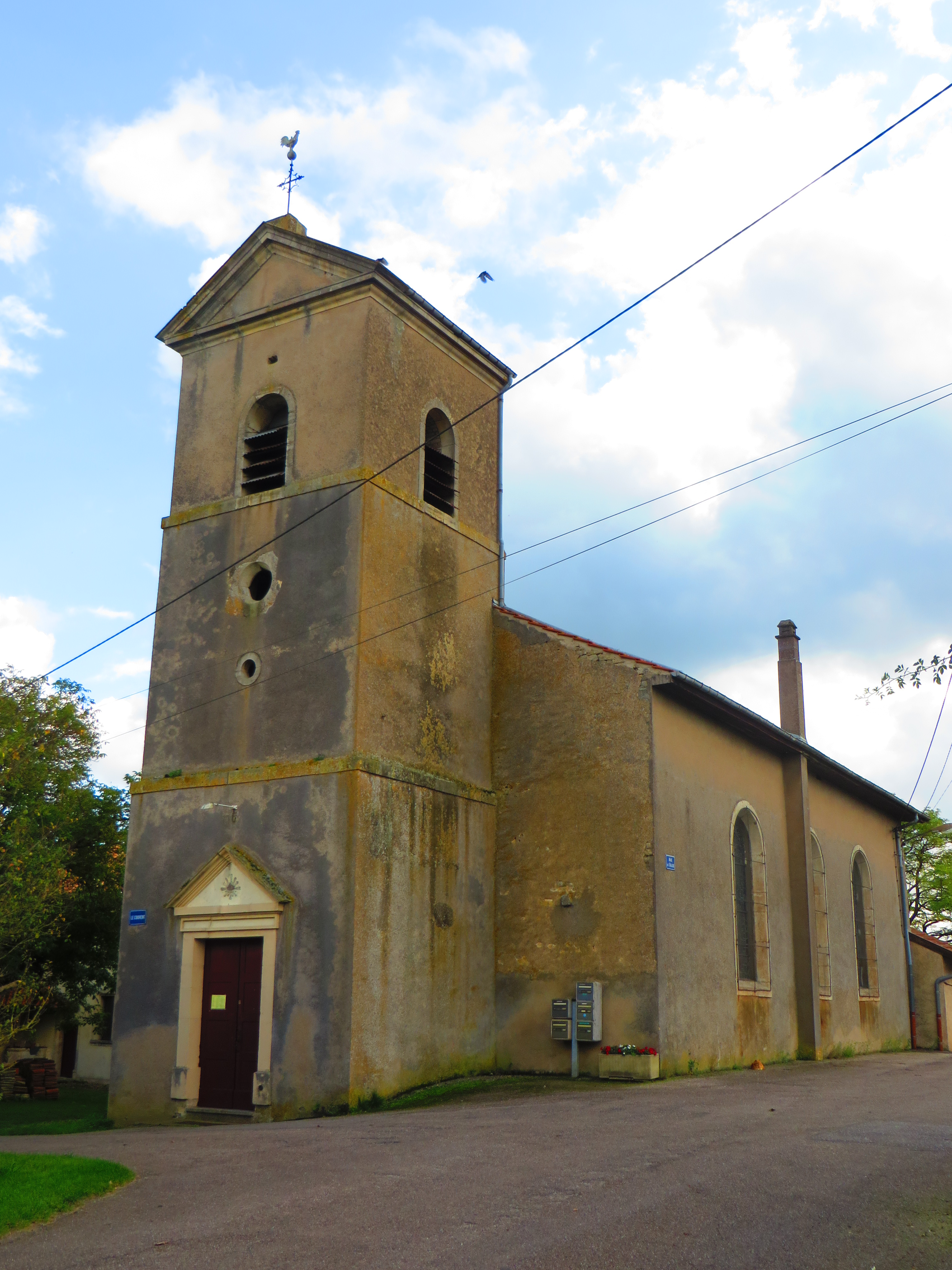
- The church in Viviers

- Coat of arms
- Location of Viviers
- Location within France Location within Grand Est
- Coordinates: 48°53′29″N 6°26′10″E
- Country: France
- Region: Grand Est
- Department: Moselle
- Arrondissement: Sarrebourg-Château-Salins
- Canton: Le Saulnois
- Intercommunality: Saulnois

Government
  - Mayor (2020–2026): Bertrand Cézard
- Area^{1}: 7.2 km^{2} (2.8 sq mi)
- Elevation: 250 m (820 ft)
- Highest elevation: 293 m (961 ft)
- Lowest elevation: 234 m (768 ft)
- Population (2023): 120
  - Density: 17/km^{2} (43/sq mi)
- Time zone: UTC+01:00 (CET)
  - Summer (DST): UTC+02:00 (CEST)
- INSEE/Postal code: 57727 /57590
- ^{1} French Land Register data, which excludes lakes, ponds, glaciers > 1 km^{2} (0.386 sq mi or 247 acres) and river estuaries.

Viviers (French pronunciation: [vivje]; German: Weiher) is a commune in the Moselle department in Grand Est in north-eastern France.

== See also ==
- Communes of the Moselle department
