= Morville-sur-Nied =

- Commune
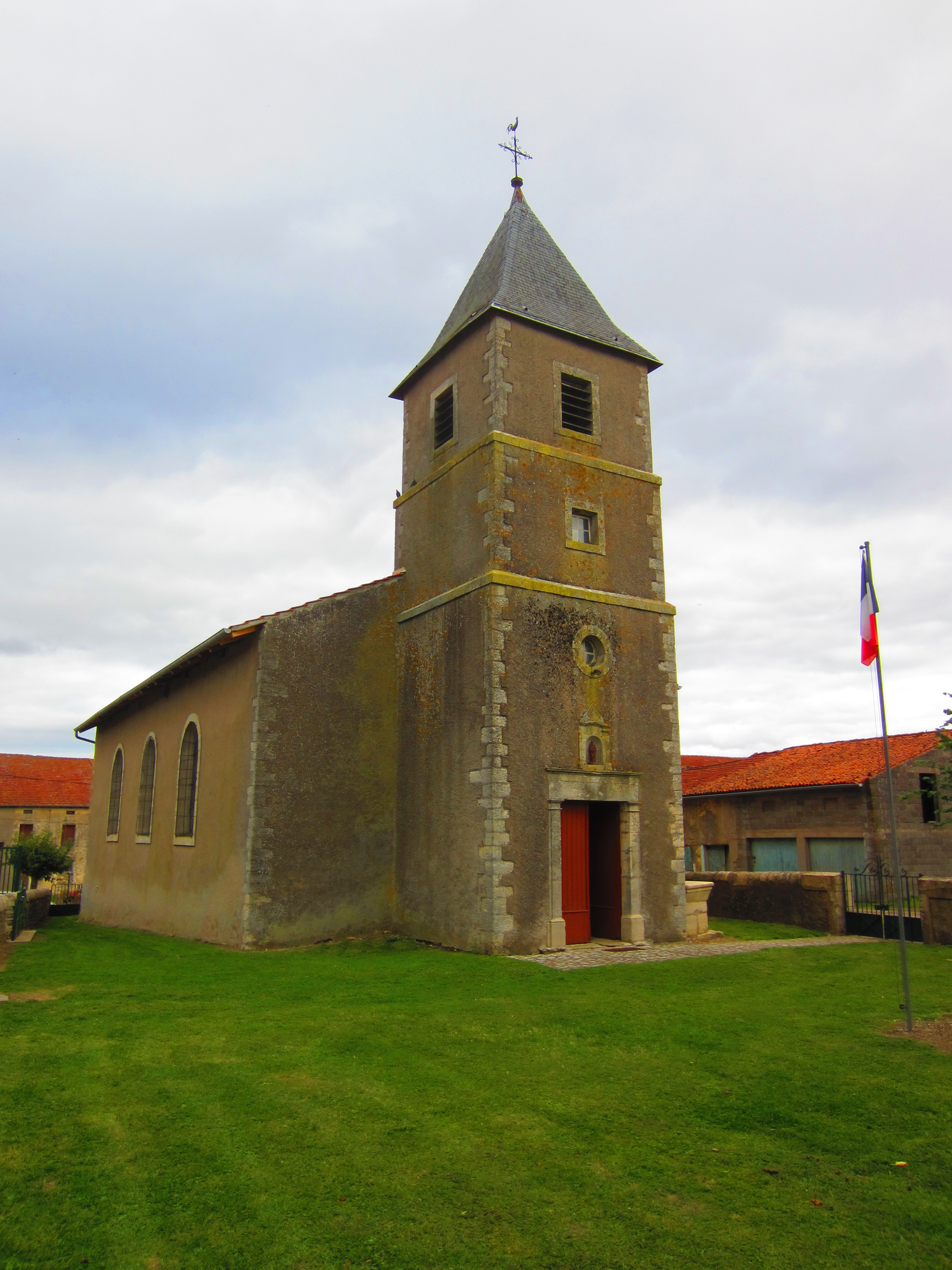
- The church in Morville-sur-Nied

- Coat of arms
- Location of Morville-sur-Nied
- Location within France Location within Grand Est
- Coordinates: 48°56′53″N 6°26′06″E
- Country: France
- Region: Grand Est
- Department: Moselle
- Arrondissement: Sarrebourg-Château-Salins
- Canton: Le Saulnois
- Intercommunality: CC du Saulnois

Government
  - Mayor (2020–2026): Laurence Belloy
- Area^{1}: 5.64 km^{2} (2.18 sq mi)
- Elevation: 240 m (790 ft)
- Highest elevation: 271 m (889 ft)
- Lowest elevation: 227 m (745 ft)
- Population (2023): 121
  - Density: 21.5/km^{2} (55.6/sq mi)
- Time zone: UTC+01:00 (CET)
  - Summer (DST): UTC+02:00 (CEST)
- INSEE/Postal code: 57486 /57590
- ^{1} French Land Register data, which excludes lakes, ponds, glaciers > 1 km^{2} (0.386 sq mi or 247 acres) and river estuaries.

Morville-sur-Nied (French pronunciation: [mɔʁvil syʁ nje], literally Morville on Nied; German: Morsweiler an der Nied) is a commune in the Moselle department in Grand Est in north-eastern France.

== See also ==
- Communes of the Moselle department
