= Donjeux, Moselle =

Donjeux
- Commune
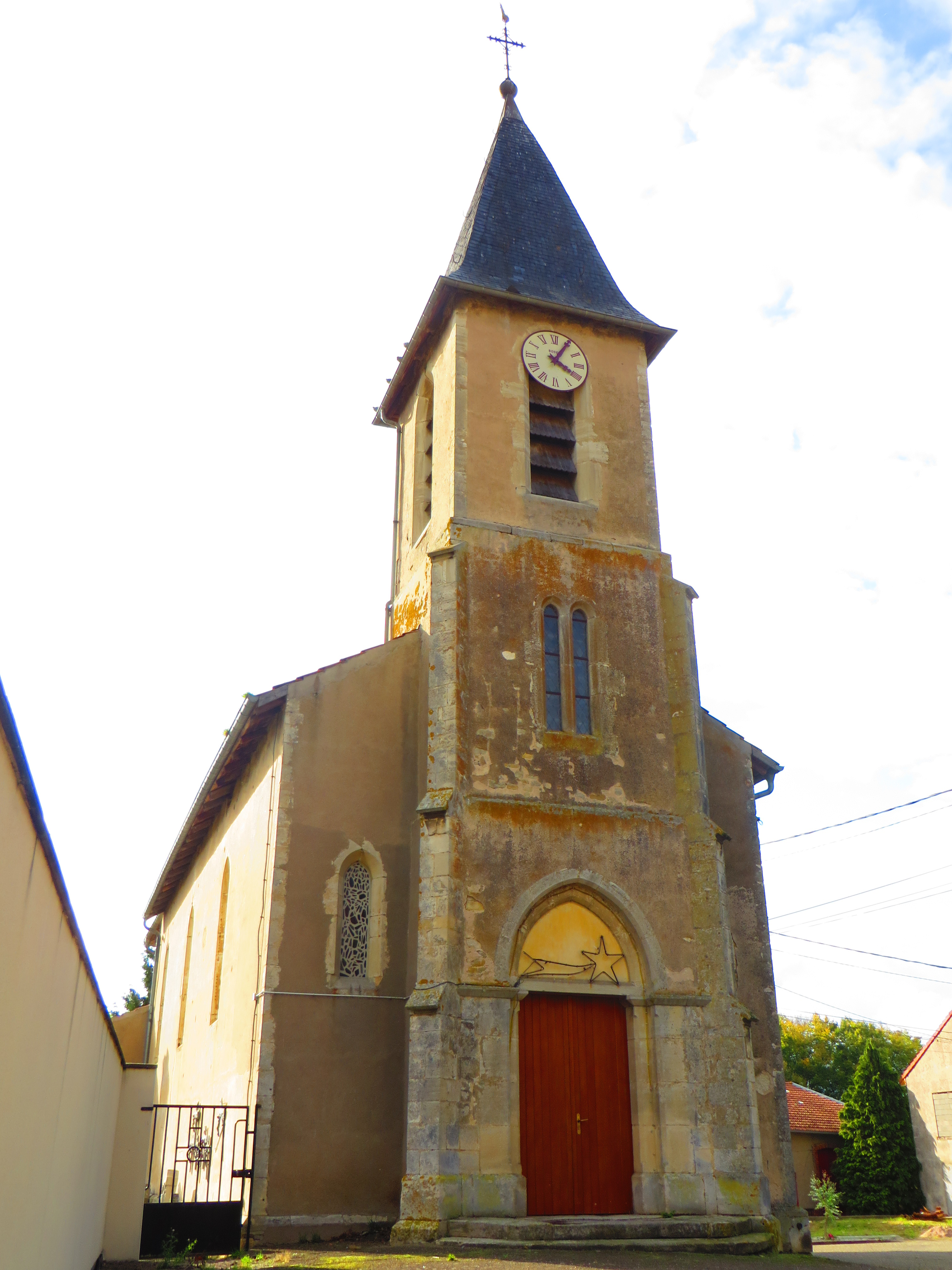
- The church in Donjeux

- Coat of arms
- Location of Donjeux
- Location within France Location within Grand Est
- Coordinates: 48°52′42″N 6°24′12″E
- Country: France
- Region: Grand Est
- Department: Moselle
- Arrondissement: Sarrebourg-Château-Salins
- Canton: Le Saulnois
- Intercommunality: Saulnois

Government
  - Mayor (2020–2026): Serge Lemoine
- Area^{1}: 3.25 km^{2} (1.25 sq mi)
- Elevation: 153 m (502 ft)
- Highest elevation: 275 m (902 ft)
- Lowest elevation: 219 m (719 ft)
- Population (2023): 92
  - Density: 28/km^{2} (73/sq mi)
- Time zone: UTC+01:00 (CET)
  - Summer (DST): UTC+02:00 (CEST)
- INSEE/Postal code: 57182 /57590
- ^{1} French Land Register data, which excludes lakes, ponds, glaciers > 1 km^{2} (0.386 sq mi or 247 acres) and river estuaries.

Donjeux (French pronunciation: [dɔ̃ʒø]; German: Domningen) is a commune in the Moselle department in Grand Est in north-eastern France.

== See also ==
- Communes of the Moselle department
