= Frémery =

- Commune
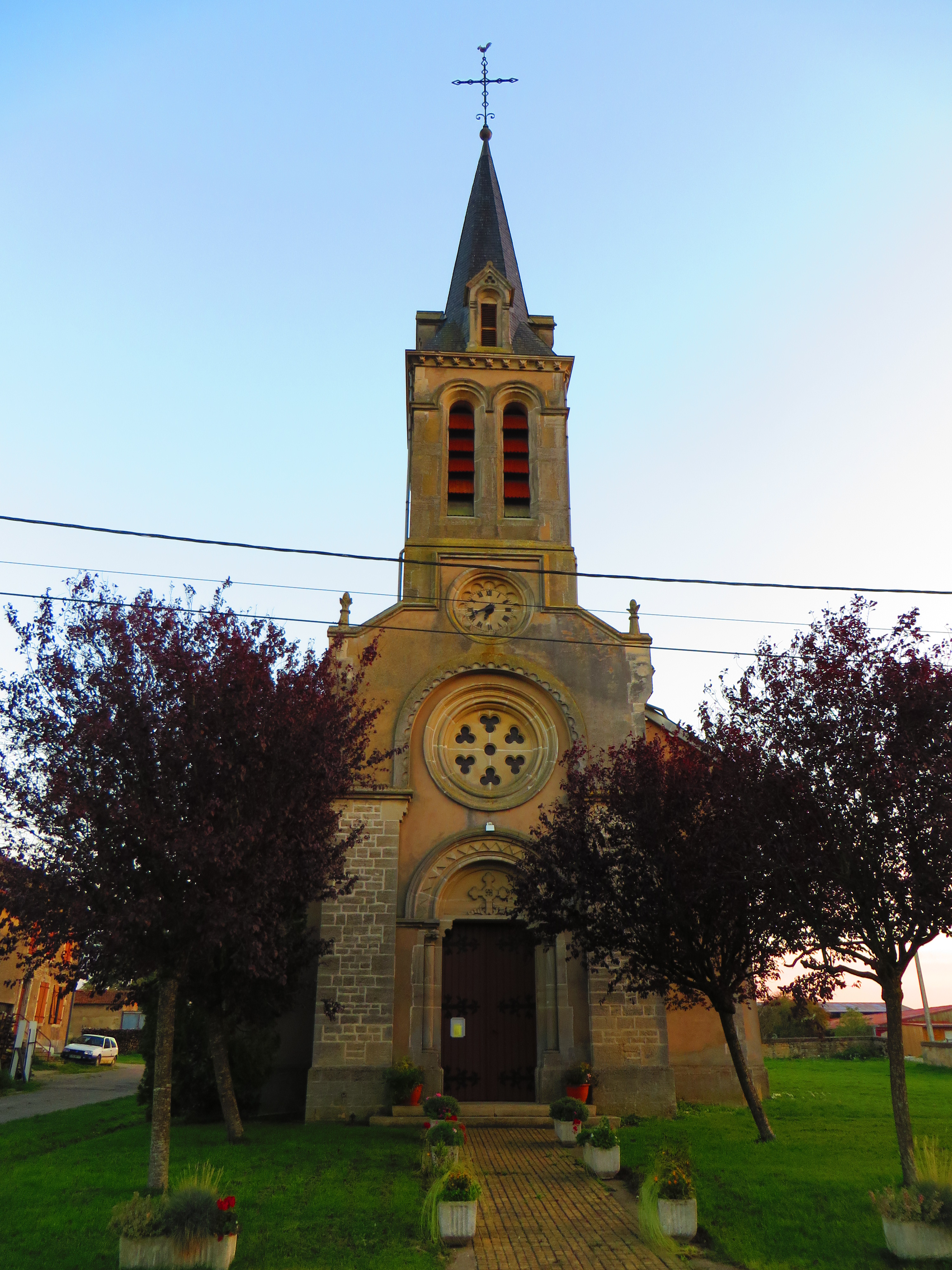
- The church in Frémery

- Coat of arms
- Location of Frémery
- Location within France Location within Grand Est
- Coordinates: 48°55′12″N 6°28′28″E
- Country: France
- Region: Grand Est
- Department: Moselle
- Arrondissement: Sarrebourg-Château-Salins
- Canton: Le Saulnois
- Intercommunality: CC du Saulnois

Government
  - Mayor (2020–2026): Marie-Thérèse Barbier
- Area^{1}: 4.39 km^{2} (1.69 sq mi)
- Elevation: 330 m (1,080 ft)
- Highest elevation: 280 m (920 ft)
- Lowest elevation: 228 m (748 ft)
- Population (2023): 87
  - Density: 20/km^{2} (51/sq mi)
- Time zone: UTC+01:00 (CET)
  - Summer (DST): UTC+02:00 (CEST)
- INSEE/Postal code: 57236 /57590
- ^{1} French Land Register data, which excludes lakes, ponds, glaciers > 1 km^{2} (0.386 sq mi or 247 acres) and river estuaries.

Frémery (French pronunciation: [fʁɛmʁi]; German: Fremerchen) is a commune in the Moselle department in Grand Est in north-eastern France.

== See also ==
- Communes of the Moselle department
