= Hannocourt =

- Commune
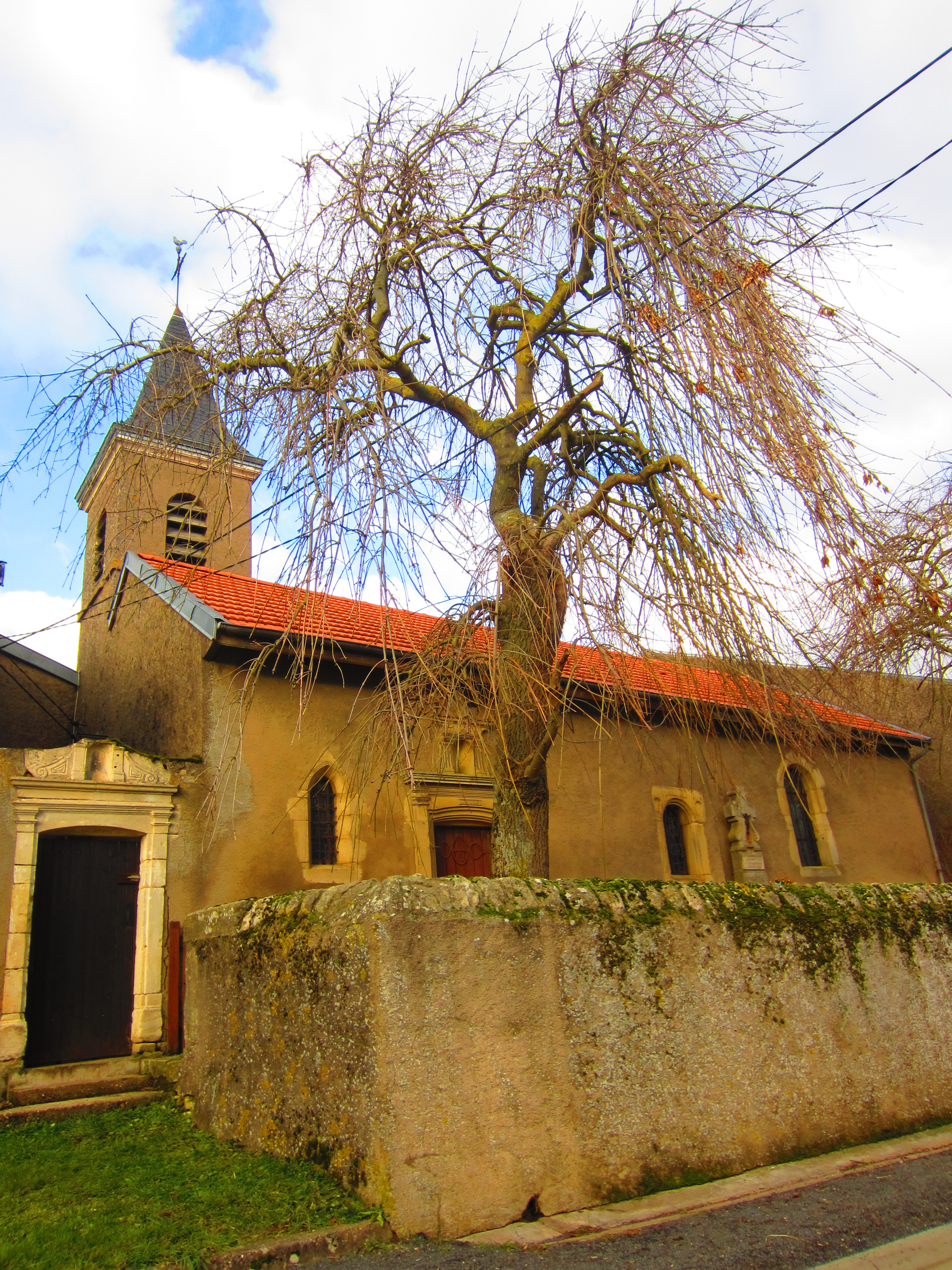
- The church in Hannocourt

- Coat of arms
- Location of Hannocourt
- Location within France Location within Grand Est
- Coordinates: 48°54′31″N 6°26′32″E
- Country: France
- Region: Grand Est
- Department: Moselle
- Arrondissement: Sarrebourg-Château-Salins
- Canton: Le Saulnois
- Intercommunality: CC du Saulnois

Government
  - Mayor (2020–2026): Jean-Noël Godfrin
- Area^{1}: 4.21 km^{2} (1.63 sq mi)
- Elevation: 250 m (820 ft)
- Highest elevation: 270 m (890 ft)
- Lowest elevation: 231 m (758 ft)
- Population (2023): 15
  - Density: 3.6/km^{2} (9.2/sq mi)
- Time zone: UTC+01:00 (CET)
  - Summer (DST): UTC+02:00 (CEST)
- INSEE/Postal code: 57292 /57590
- ^{1} French Land Register data, which excludes lakes, ponds, glaciers > 1 km^{2} (0.386 sq mi or 247 acres) and river estuaries.

Hannocourt (French pronunciation: [anɔkuʁ]; German: Handorf) is a commune in the Moselle department in Grand Est in north-eastern France.

== See also ==
- Communes of the Moselle department
