= Laneuveville-en-Saulnois =

- Commune
- Coat of arms
- Location of Laneuveville-en-Saulnois
- Location within France Location within Grand Est
- Coordinates: 48°52′06″N 6°26′10″E
- Country: France
- Region: Grand Est
- Department: Moselle
- Arrondissement: Sarrebourg-Château-Salins
- Canton: Le Saulnois
- Intercommunality: CC du Saulnois

Government
  - Mayor (2020–2026): Gilles Etienne
- Area^{1}: 6.49 km^{2} (2.51 sq mi)
- Elevation: 290 m (950 ft)
- Highest elevation: 342 m (1,122 ft)
- Lowest elevation: 255 m (837 ft)
- Population (2023): 285
  - Density: 43.9/km^{2} (114/sq mi)
- Time zone: UTC+01:00 (CET)
  - Summer (DST): UTC+02:00 (CEST)
- INSEE/Postal code: 57381 /57590
- ^{1} French Land Register data, which excludes lakes, ponds, glaciers > 1 km^{2} (0.386 sq mi or 247 acres) and river estuaries.

Laneuveville-en-Saulnois (German: Neuheim) is a commune in the Moselle department in Grand Est in north-eastern France.

== See also ==
- Communes of the Moselle department
