= Lemoncourt =

- Commune
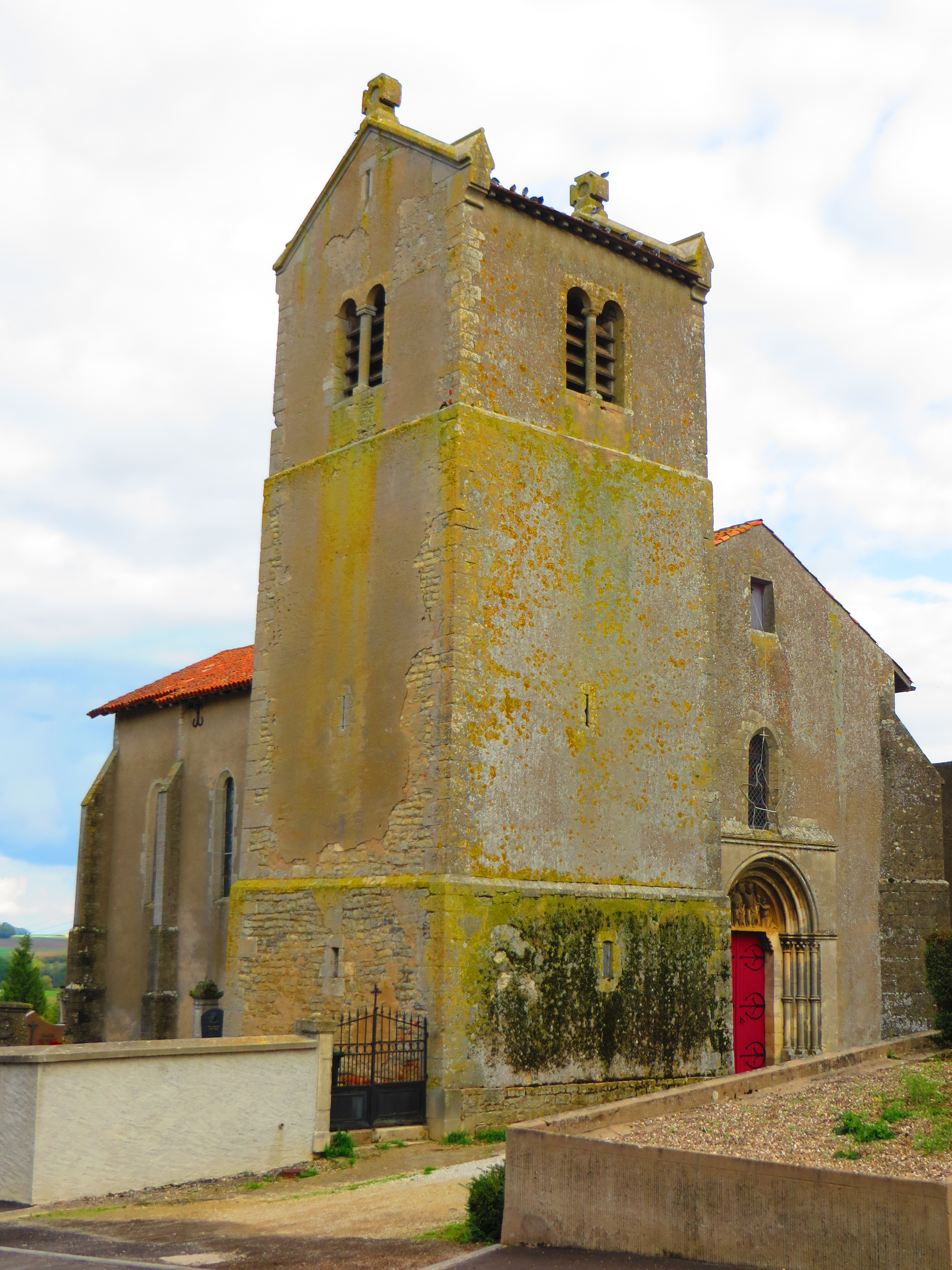
- The church in Lemoncourt

- Coat of arms
- Location of Lemoncourt
- Location within France Location within Grand Est
- Coordinates: 48°52′01″N 6°23′33″E
- Country: France
- Region: Grand Est
- Department: Moselle
- Arrondissement: Sarrebourg-Château-Salins
- Canton: Le Saulnois
- Intercommunality: CC du Saulnois

Government
  - Mayor (2024–2026): Sonia Pernet
- Area^{1}: 5.41 km^{2} (2.09 sq mi)
- Elevation: 265 m (869 ft)
- Highest elevation: 292 m (958 ft)
- Lowest elevation: 215 m (705 ft)
- Population (2023): 57
  - Density: 11/km^{2} (27/sq mi)
- Time zone: UTC+01:00 (CET)
  - Summer (DST): UTC+02:00 (CEST)
- INSEE/Postal code: 57391 /57590
- ^{1} French Land Register data, which excludes lakes, ponds, glaciers > 1 km^{2} (0.386 sq mi or 247 acres) and river estuaries.

Lemoncourt (French pronunciation: [ləmɔ̃kuʁ]; German: Lemhofen) is a commune in the Moselle department in Grand Est in north-eastern France.

== See also ==
- Communes of the Moselle department
