= Oron, Moselle =

Oron
- Commune
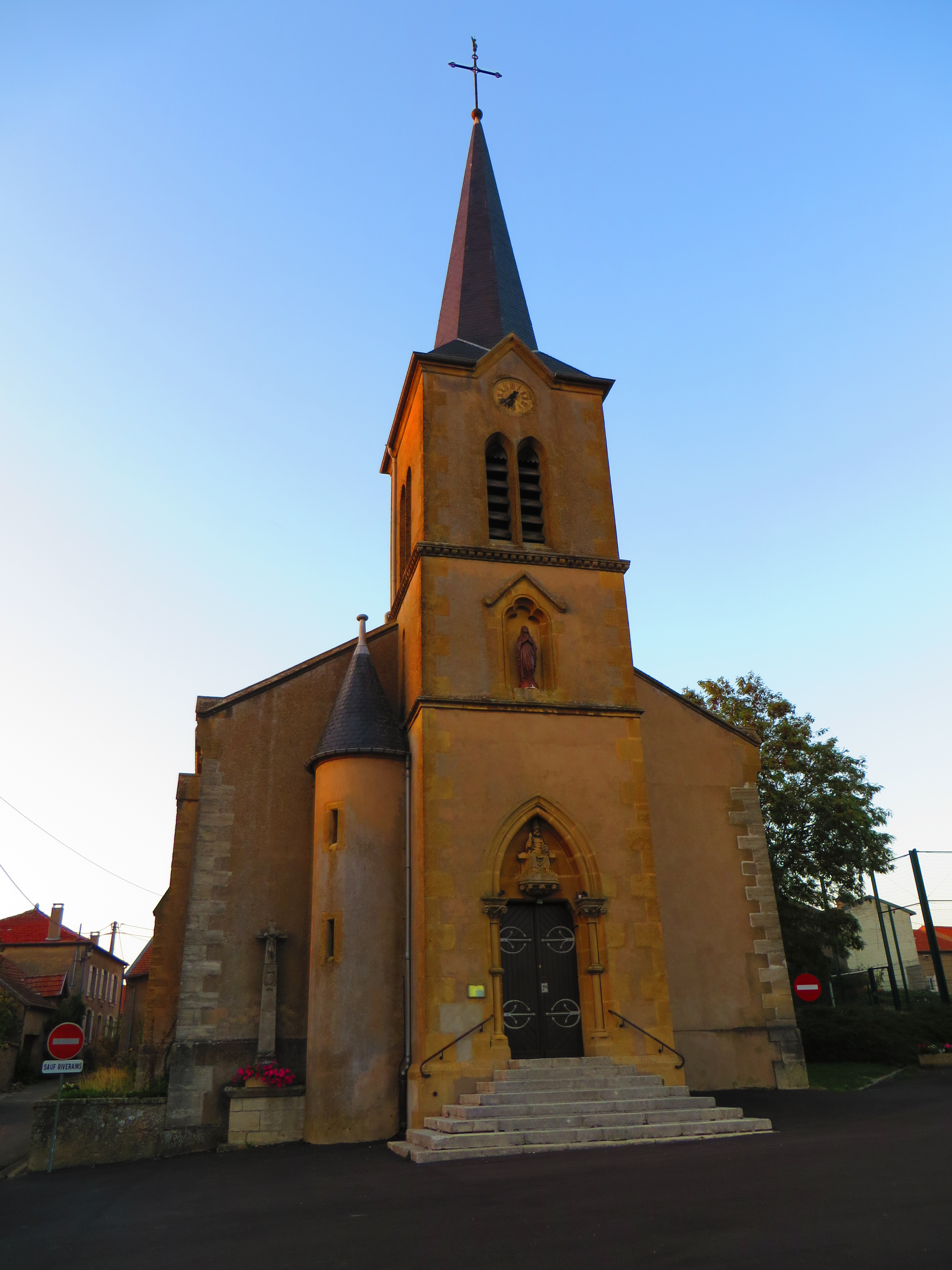
- The church in Oron

- Coat of arms
- Location of Oron
- Location within France Location within Grand Est
- Coordinates: 48°54′24″N 6°28′50″E
- Country: France
- Region: Grand Est
- Department: Moselle
- Arrondissement: Sarrebourg-Château-Salins
- Canton: Le Saulnois
- Intercommunality: CC du Saulnois

Government
  - Mayor (2020–2026): Jean-Marc Choné
- Area^{1}: 5.37 km^{2} (2.07 sq mi)
- Elevation: 240 m (790 ft)
- Highest elevation: 302 m (991 ft)
- Lowest elevation: 234 m (768 ft)
- Population (2023): 111
  - Density: 20.7/km^{2} (53.5/sq mi)
- Time zone: UTC+01:00 (CET)
  - Summer (DST): UTC+02:00 (CEST)
- INSEE/Postal code: 57528 /57590
- ^{1} French Land Register data, which excludes lakes, ponds, glaciers > 1 km^{2} (0.386 sq mi or 247 acres) and river estuaries.

Oron (French pronunciation: [ɔʁɔ̃]; German: Orn) is a commune in the Moselle department in Grand Est in north-eastern France.

== See also ==
- Communes of the Moselle department
