= Fonteny =

- Commune
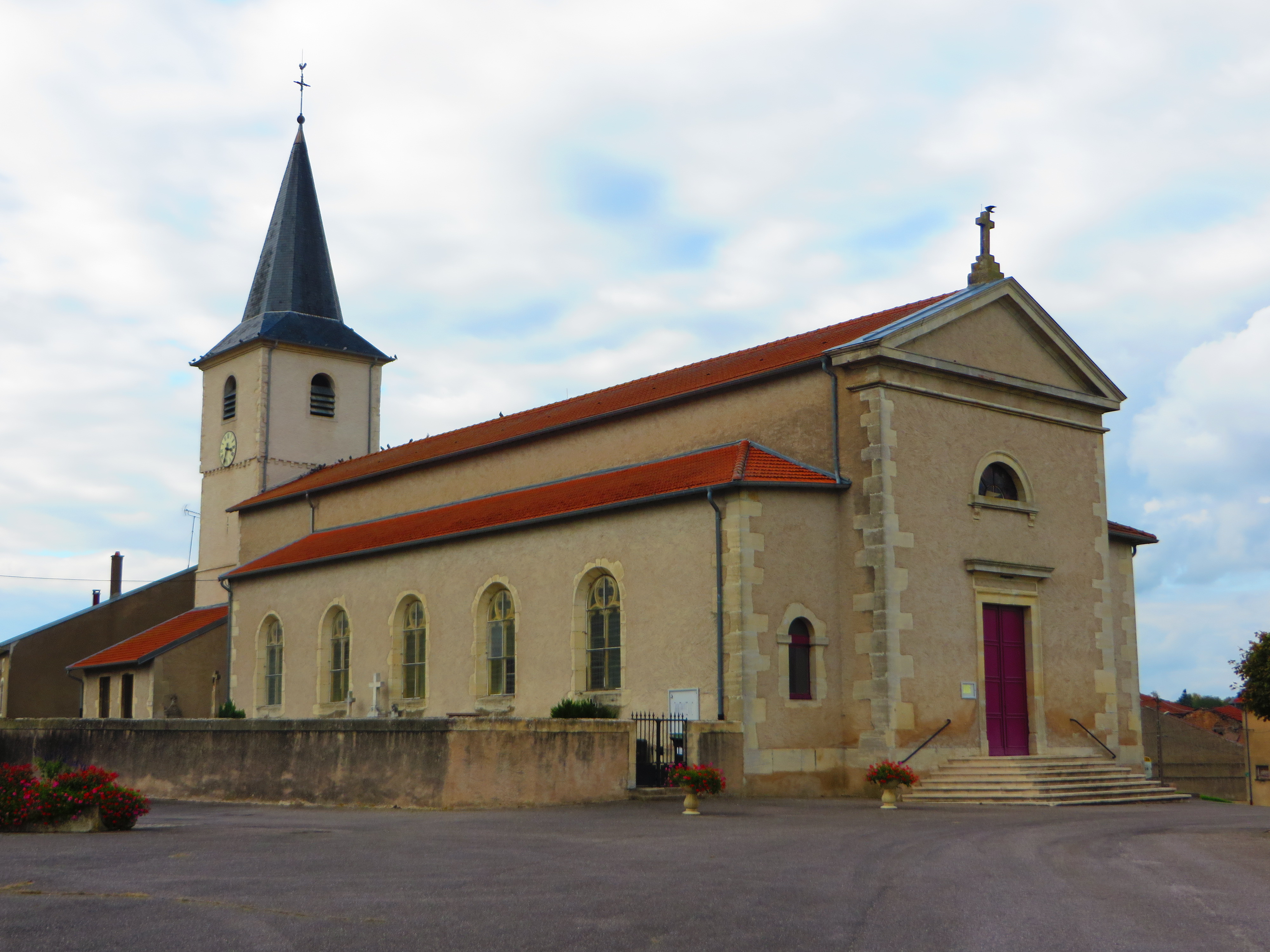
- The church in Fonteny

- Coat of arms
- Location of Fonteny
- Location within France Location within Grand Est
- Coordinates: 48°52′54″N 6°27′56″E
- Country: France
- Region: Grand Est
- Department: Moselle
- Arrondissement: Sarrebourg-Château-Salins
- Canton: Le Saulnois
- Intercommunality: CC du Saulnois

Government
  - Mayor (2020–2026): Alain Donatin
- Area^{1}: 15.7 km^{2} (6.1 sq mi)
- Elevation: 240 m (790 ft)
- Highest elevation: 350 m (1,150 ft)
- Lowest elevation: 238 m (781 ft)
- Population (2023): 143
  - Density: 9.11/km^{2} (23.6/sq mi)
- Time zone: UTC+01:00 (CET)
  - Summer (DST): UTC+02:00 (CEST)
- INSEE/Postal code: 57225 /57590
- ^{1} French Land Register data, which excludes lakes, ponds, glaciers > 1 km^{2} (0.386 sq mi or 247 acres) and river estuaries.

Fonteny (French pronunciation: [fɔ̃tni]; German: Fonteningen) is a commune in the Moselle department in Grand Est in north-eastern France.

== See also ==
- Communes of the Moselle department
