= Oriocourt =

- Commune
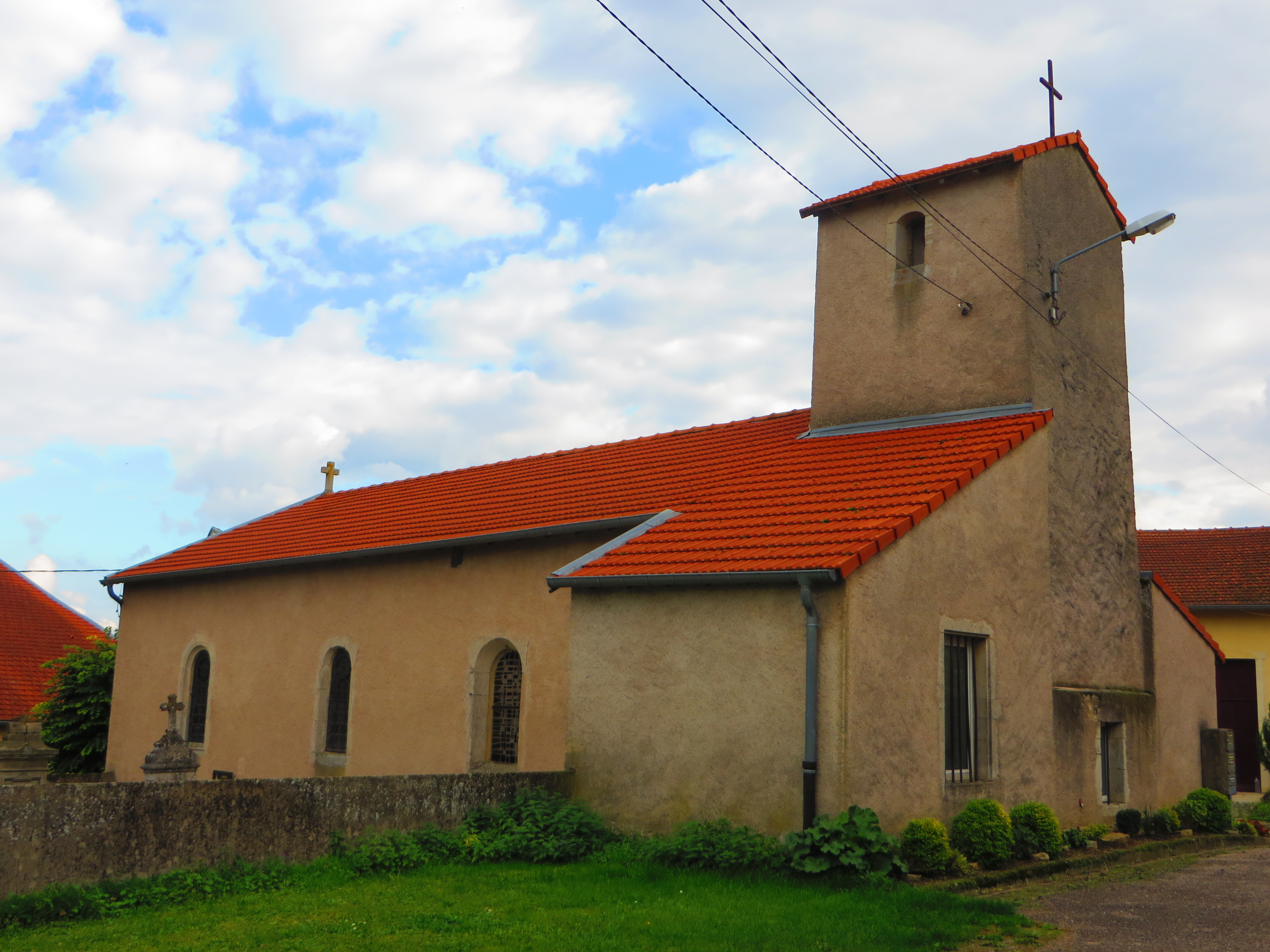
- The church in Oriocourt

- Coat of arms
- Location of Oriocourt
- Location within France Location within Grand Est
- Coordinates: 48°51′58″N 6°24′46″E
- Country: France
- Region: Grand Est
- Department: Moselle
- Arrondissement: Sarrebourg-Château-Salins
- Canton: Le Saulnois
- Intercommunality: CC du Saulnois

Government
  - Mayor (2020–2026): Thierry Albrique
- Area^{1}: 4.44 km^{2} (1.71 sq mi)
- Elevation: 210 m (690 ft)
- Highest elevation: 296 m (971 ft)
- Lowest elevation: 228 m (748 ft)
- Population (2023): 55
  - Density: 12/km^{2} (32/sq mi)
- Time zone: UTC+01:00 (CET)
  - Summer (DST): UTC+02:00 (CEST)
- INSEE/Postal code: 57525 /57590
- ^{1} French Land Register data, which excludes lakes, ponds, glaciers > 1 km^{2} (0.386 sq mi or 247 acres) and river estuaries.

Oriocourt (French pronunciation: [ɔʁjɔkuʁ]; German: Orhofen) is a commune in the Moselle department in Grand Est in north-eastern France.

== See also ==
- Communes of the Moselle department
