= Bénestroff =

- Commune
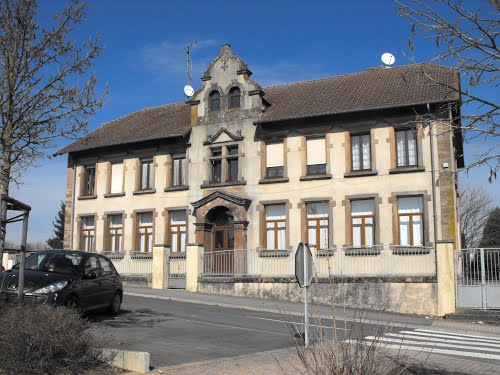
- The old school in Bénestroff

- Coat of arms
- Location of Bénestroff
- Location within France Location within Grand Est
- Coordinates: 48°54′18″N 6°45′36″E
- Country: France
- Region: Grand Est
- Department: Moselle
- Arrondissement: Sarrebourg-Château-Salins
- Canton: Le Saulnois
- Intercommunality: CC Saulnois

Government
  - Mayor (2020–2026): Francis Jayer
- Area^{1}: 9.56 km^{2} (3.69 sq mi)
- Elevation: 320 m (1,050 ft)
- Highest elevation: 330 m (1,080 ft)
- Lowest elevation: 222 m (728 ft)
- Population (2023): 516
  - Density: 54.0/km^{2} (140/sq mi)
- Time zone: UTC+01:00 (CET)
  - Summer (DST): UTC+02:00 (CEST)
- INSEE/Postal code: 57060 /57670
- ^{1} French Land Register data, which excludes lakes, ponds, glaciers > 1 km^{2} (0.386 sq mi or 247 acres) and river estuaries.

Bénestroff (French pronunciation: [benɛstʁɔf]; German: Bensdorf) is a commune in the Moselle department in Grand Est in northeastern France.

== See also ==
- Communes of the Moselle department
