= Villers-sur-Nied =

- Commune
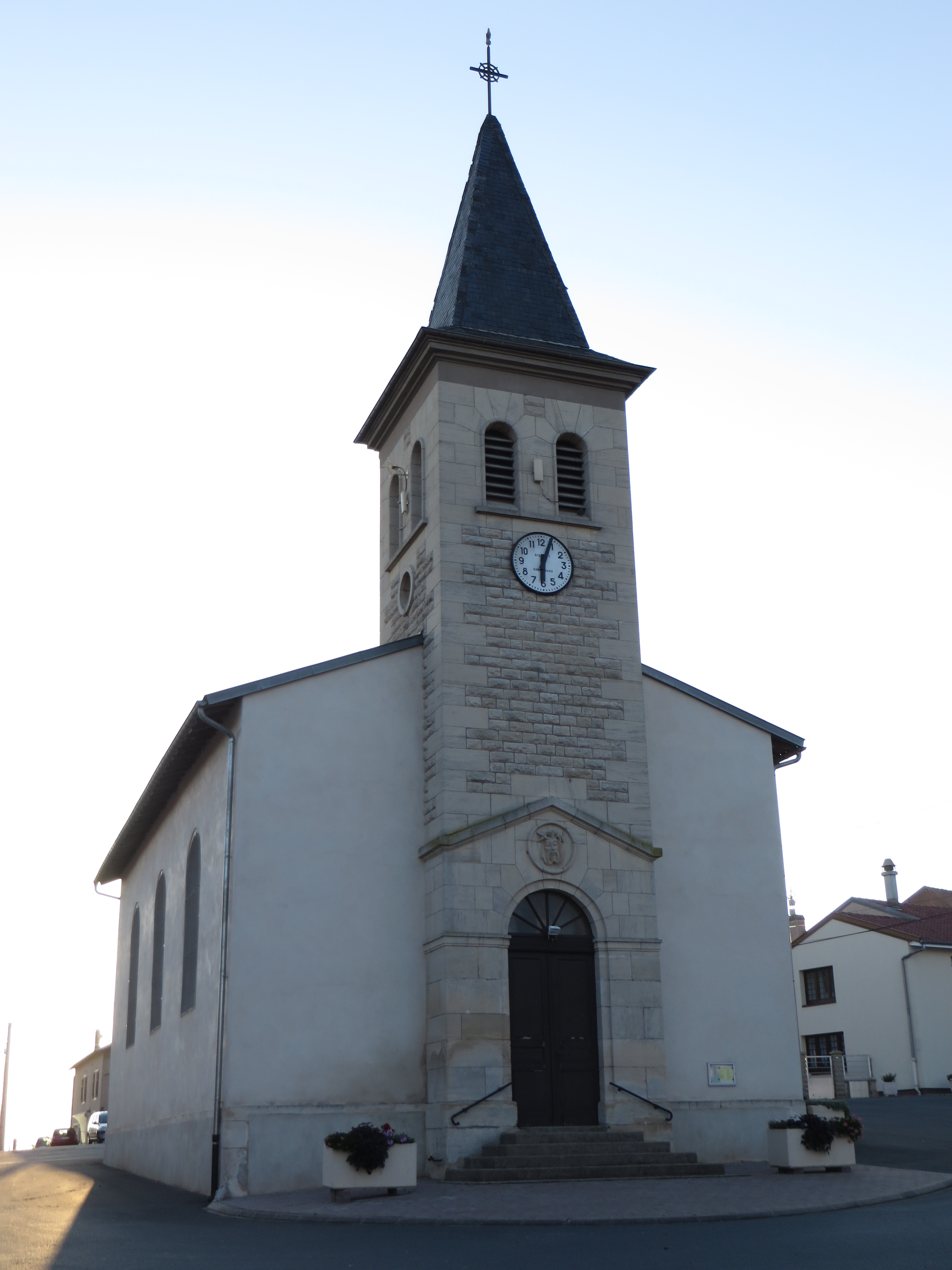
- The church in Villers-sur-Nied

- Coat of arms
- Location of Villers-sur-Nied
- Location within France Location within Grand Est
- Coordinates: 48°55′21″N 6°32′12″E
- Country: France
- Region: Grand Est
- Department: Moselle
- Arrondissement: Sarrebourg-Château-Salins
- Canton: Le Saulnois
- Intercommunality: CC du Saulnois

Government
  - Mayor (2020–2026): Jean-François Lemale
- Area^{1}: 4.25 km^{2} (1.64 sq mi)
- Elevation: 250 m (820 ft)
- Highest elevation: 358 m (1,175 ft)
- Lowest elevation: 244 m (801 ft)
- Population (2023): 81
  - Density: 19/km^{2} (49/sq mi)
- Time zone: UTC+01:00 (CET)
  - Summer (DST): UTC+02:00 (CEST)
- INSEE/Postal code: 57719 /57340
- ^{1} French Land Register data, which excludes lakes, ponds, glaciers > 1 km^{2} (0.386 sq mi or 247 acres) and river estuaries.

Villers-sur-Nied (German: Niedweiler) is a commune in the Moselle department in Grand Est in north-eastern France.

== See also ==
- Communes of the Moselle department
