= Saint-Epvre =

- Commune
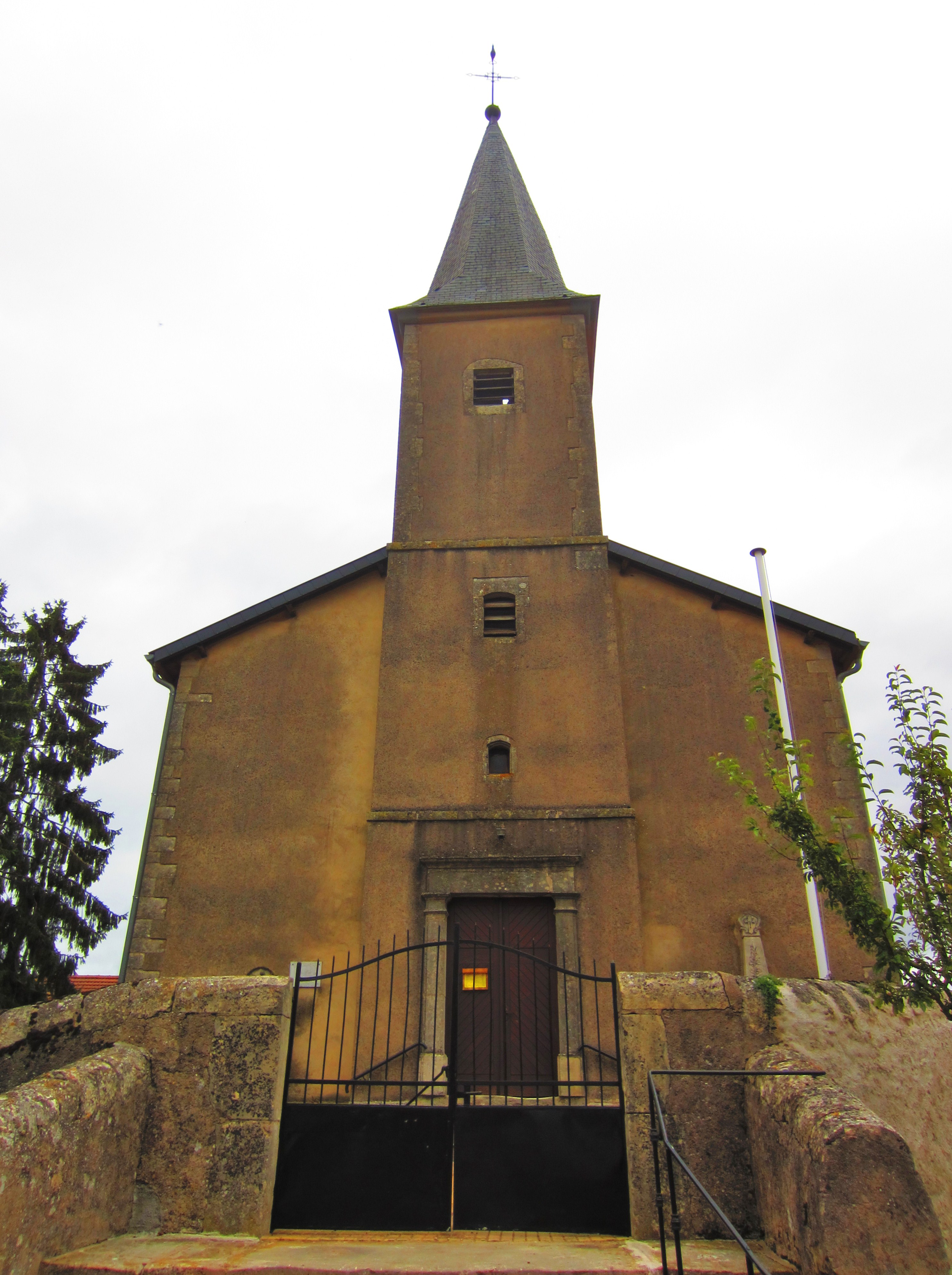
- The church in Saint-Epvre

- Coat of arms
- Location of Saint-Epvre
- Location within France Location within Grand Est
- Coordinates: 48°58′29″N 6°26′17″E
- Country: France
- Region: Grand Est
- Department: Moselle
- Arrondissement: Sarrebourg-Château-Salins
- Canton: Le Saulnois
- Intercommunality: CC Saulnois

Government
  - Mayor (2020–2026): Jean-Pierre Leonard
- Area^{1}: 4.67 km^{2} (1.80 sq mi)
- Elevation: 215 m (705 ft)
- Highest elevation: 267 m (876 ft)
- Lowest elevation: 224 m (735 ft)
- Population (2023): 177
  - Density: 37.9/km^{2} (98.2/sq mi)
- Time zone: UTC+01:00 (CET)
  - Summer (DST): UTC+02:00 (CEST)
- INSEE/Postal code: 57609 /57580
- ^{1} French Land Register data, which excludes lakes, ponds, glaciers > 1 km^{2} (0.386 sq mi or 247 acres) and river estuaries.

Saint-Epvre (French pronunciation: [sɛ̃t‿ɛvʁ]; German: Sankt Erffert) is a commune in the Moselle department, Grand Est, northeastern France.

== See also ==
- Communes of the Moselle department
