= Chenois =

- Commune
- Coat of arms
- Location of Chenois
- Location within France Location within Grand Est
- Coordinates: 48°57′36″N 6°29′54″E
- Country: France
- Region: Grand Est
- Department: Moselle
- Arrondissement: Sarrebourg-Château-Salins
- Canton: Le Saulnois
- Intercommunality: CC du Saulnois

Government
  - Mayor (2020–2026): Sandrine Chir
- Area^{1}: 3.62 km^{2} (1.40 sq mi)
- Elevation: 315 m (1,033 ft)
- Highest elevation: 311 m (1,020 ft)
- Lowest elevation: 226 m (741 ft)
- Population (2023): 79
  - Density: 22/km^{2} (57/sq mi)
- Time zone: UTC+01:00 (CET)
  - Summer (DST): UTC+02:00 (CEST)
- INSEE/Postal code: 57138 /57580
- ^{1} French Land Register data, which excludes lakes, ponds, glaciers > 1 km^{2} (0.386 sq mi or 247 acres) and river estuaries.

Chenois (French pronunciation: [ʃənwa]; German: Eichendorf) is a commune in the Moselle department in Grand Est in north-eastern France.

== See also ==
- Communes of the Moselle department
