= Montdidier, Moselle =

Montdidier
- Commune
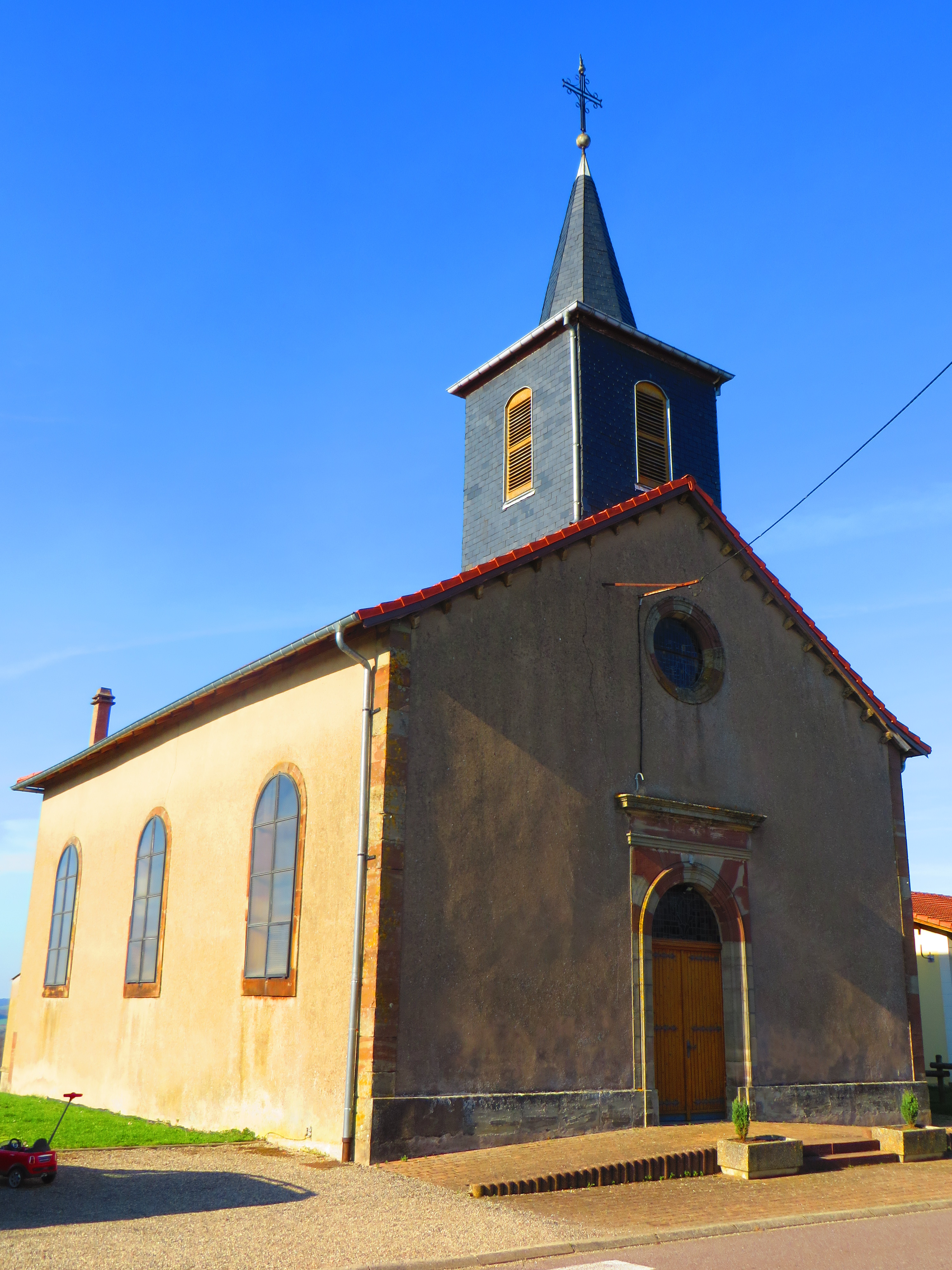
- The church in Montdidier

- Coat of arms
- Location of Montdidier
- Location within France Location within Grand Est
- Coordinates: 48°55′49″N 6°49′05″E
- Country: France
- Region: Grand Est
- Department: Moselle
- Arrondissement: Sarrebourg-Château-Salins
- Canton: Le Saulnois
- Intercommunality: CC du Saulnois

Government
  - Mayor (2020–2026): Jean Pfeiffer
- Area^{1}: 1.93 km^{2} (0.75 sq mi)
- Elevation: 306 m (1,004 ft)
- Highest elevation: 307 m (1,007 ft)
- Lowest elevation: 234 m (768 ft)
- Population (2023): 81
  - Density: 42/km^{2} (110/sq mi)
- Time zone: UTC+01:00 (CET)
  - Summer (DST): UTC+02:00 (CEST)
- INSEE/Postal code: 57478 /57670
- ^{1} French Land Register data, which excludes lakes, ponds, glaciers > 1 km^{2} (0.386 sq mi or 247 acres) and river estuaries.

Montdidier (French pronunciation: [mɔ̃didje]; German: Diedersberg) is a commune in the Moselle department in Grand Est in north-eastern France.

== See also ==
- Communes of the Moselle department
