= Craincourt =

- Commune
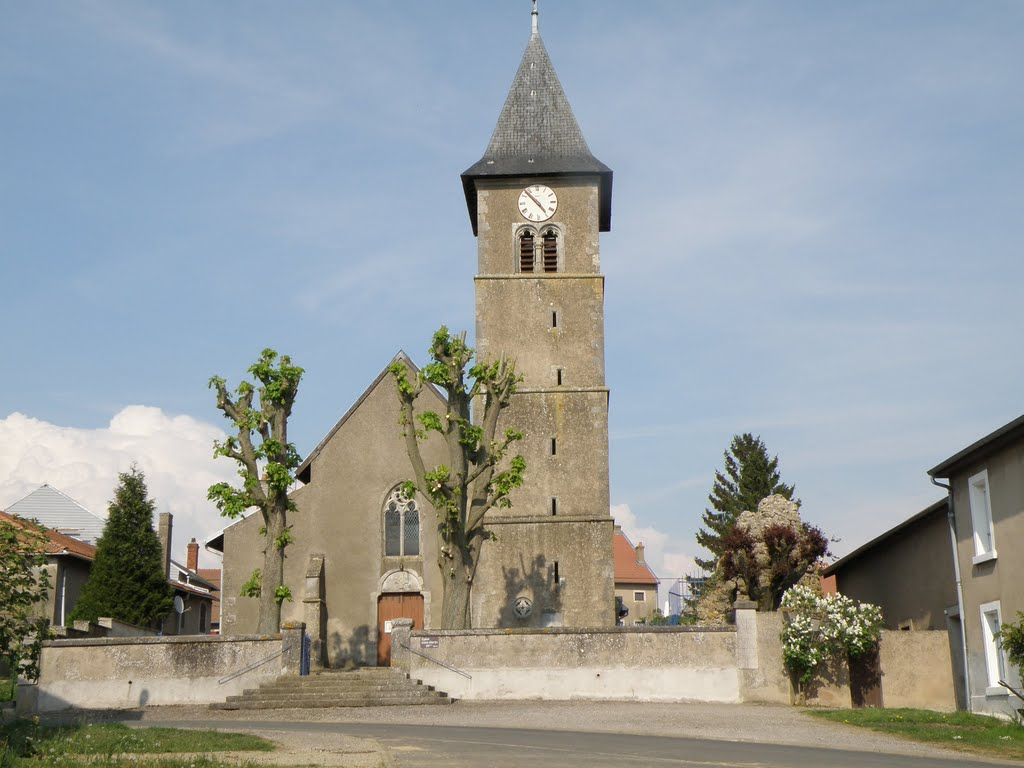
- The church in Craincourt

- Coat of arms
- Location of Craincourt
- Location within France Location within Grand Est
- Coordinates: 48°52′38″N 6°19′21″E
- Country: France
- Region: Grand Est
- Department: Moselle
- Arrondissement: Sarrebourg-Château-Salins
- Canton: Le Saulnois
- Intercommunality: CC du Saulnois

Government
  - Mayor (2020–2026): Didier Fischer
- Area^{1}: 9.06 km^{2} (3.50 sq mi)
- Elevation: 200 m (660 ft)
- Highest elevation: 268 m (879 ft)
- Lowest elevation: 187 m (614 ft)
- Population (2023): 226
  - Density: 24.9/km^{2} (64.6/sq mi)
- Time zone: UTC+01:00 (CET)
  - Summer (DST): UTC+02:00 (CEST)
- INSEE/Postal code: 57158 /57590
- ^{1} French Land Register data, which excludes lakes, ponds, glaciers > 1 km^{2} (0.386 sq mi or 247 acres) and river estuaries.

Craincourt (French pronunciation: [kʁɛ̃kuʁ]; German: Kranhofen) is a commune in the Moselle department in Grand Est in north-eastern France.

== See also ==
- Communes of the Moselle department
