= Aulnois-sur-Seille =

- Commune
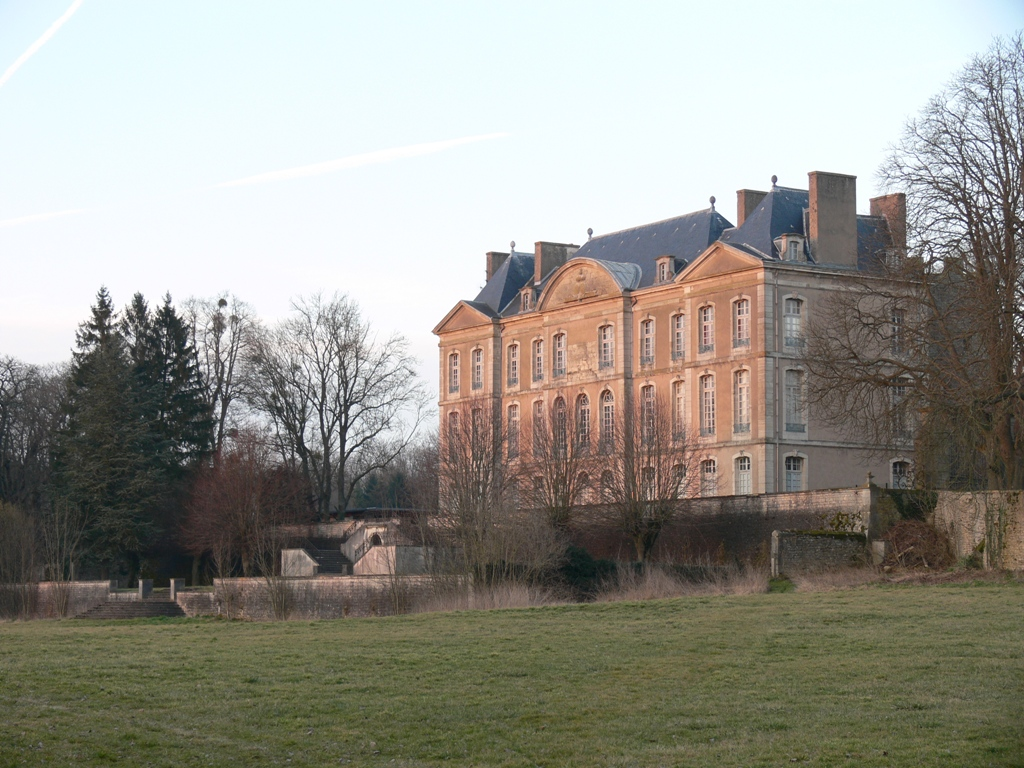
- The chateau in Aulnois-sur-Seille

- Coat of arms
- Location of Aulnois-sur-Seille
- Location within France Location within Grand Est
- Coordinates: 48°52′10″N 6°18′57″E
- Country: France
- Region: Grand Est
- Department: Moselle
- Arrondissement: Sarrebourg-Château-Salins
- Canton: Le Saulnois
- Intercommunality: CC Saulnois

Government
  - Mayor (2020–2026): Jean-Luc Provost
- Area^{1}: 5.09 km^{2} (1.97 sq mi)
- Elevation: 180 m (590 ft)
- Highest elevation: 272 m (892 ft)
- Lowest elevation: 187 m (614 ft)
- Population (2023): 313
  - Density: 61.5/km^{2} (159/sq mi)
- Time zone: UTC+01:00 (CET)
  - Summer (DST): UTC+02:00 (CEST)
- INSEE/Postal code: 57040 /57590
- ^{1} French Land Register data, which excludes lakes, ponds, glaciers > 1 km^{2} (0.386 sq mi or 247 acres) and river estuaries.

Aulnois-sur-Seille (French pronunciation: [o(l)nwa syʁ sɛj], literally Aulnois on Seille; German: Erlen) is a commune in the Moselle department in Grand Est in northeastern France.

== Population ==
Historical population
Year	Pop.	±% p.a.
1968	235	—
1975	213	−1.39%
1982	205	−0.55%
1990	214	+0.54%
1999	249	+1.70%
2007	250	+0.05%
2012	240	−0.81%
2017	278	+2.98%
2023	313	+2.00%
Source: INSEE

== See also ==
- Communes of the Moselle department
