= Bacourt =

- Commune
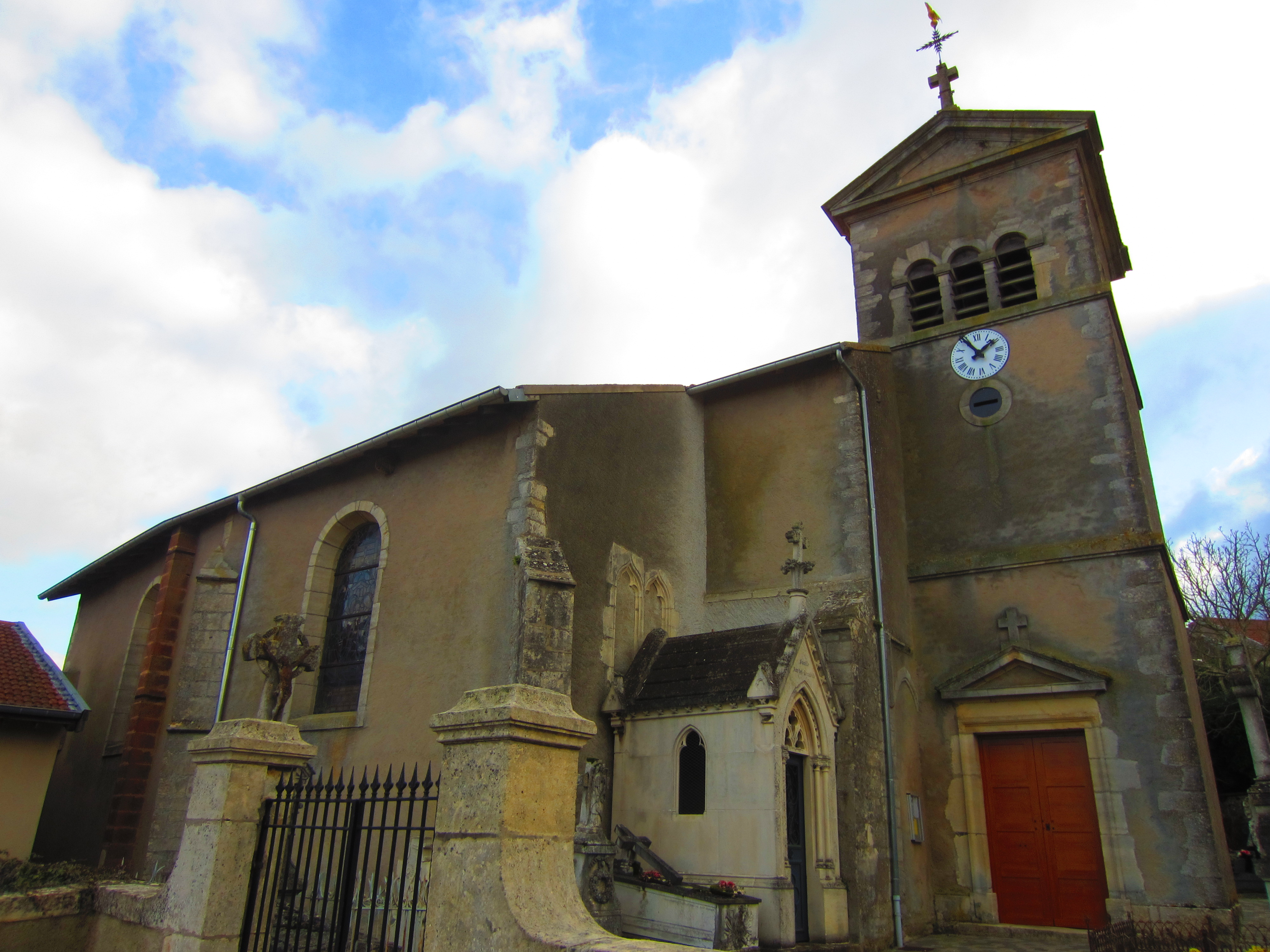
- The church in Bacourt

- Coat of arms
- Location of Bacourt
- Location within France Location within Grand Est
- Coordinates: 48°55′40″N 6°24′27″E
- Country: France
- Region: Grand Est
- Department: Moselle
- Arrondissement: Sarrebourg-Château-Salins
- Canton: Le Saulnois
- Intercommunality: CC Saulnois

Government
  - Mayor (2020–2026): Thierry Belloy
- Area^{1}: 3.89 km^{2} (1.50 sq mi)
- Elevation: 300 m (980 ft)
- Highest elevation: 357 m (1,171 ft)
- Lowest elevation: 237 m (778 ft)
- Population (2023): 114
  - Density: 29.3/km^{2} (75.9/sq mi)
- Time zone: UTC+01:00 (CET)
  - Summer (DST): UTC+02:00 (CEST)
- INSEE/Postal code: 57045 /57590
- ^{1} French Land Register data, which excludes lakes, ponds, glaciers > 1 km^{2} (0.386 sq mi or 247 acres) and river estuaries.

Bacourt (French pronunciation: [bakuʁ]; German: Badenhofen from 1915 to 1918, before Bacourt) is a commune in the Moselle department in Grand Est in northeastern France.

== Population ==
Historical population
Year	Pop.	±% p.a.
1968	127	—
1975	103	−2.95%
1982	103	+0.00%
1990	96	−0.88%
1999	109	+1.42%
2007	113	+0.45%
2012	120	+1.21%
2017	109	−1.90%
2023	114	+0.75%
Source: INSEE

== See also ==
- Communes of the Moselle department
