= Xocourt =

- Commune
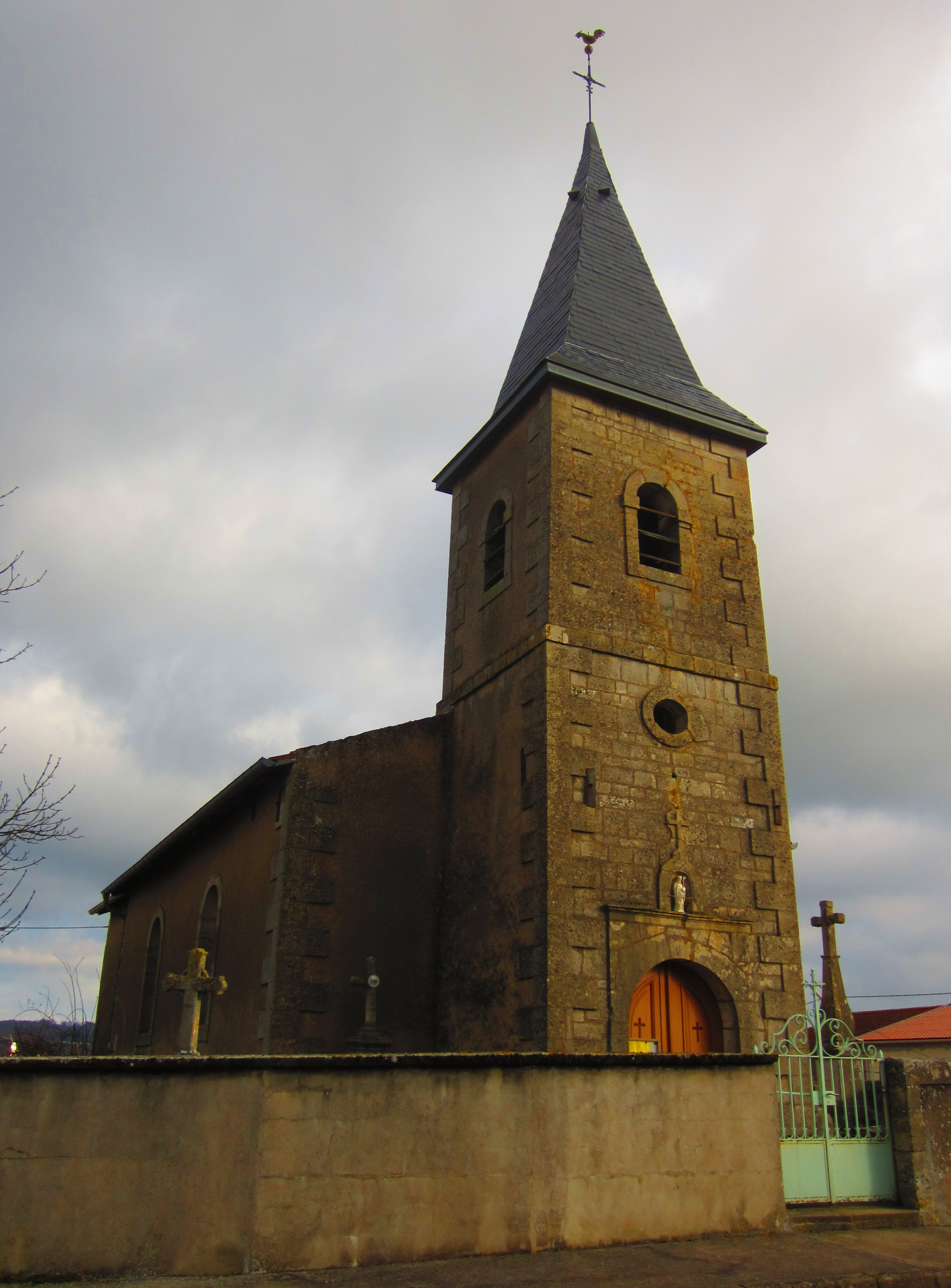
- The church in Xocourt

- Coat of arms
- Location of Xocourt
- Location within France Location within Grand Est
- Coordinates: 48°54′30″N 6°22′38″E
- Country: France
- Region: Grand Est
- Department: Moselle
- Arrondissement: Sarrebourg-Château-Salins
- Canton: Le Saulnois
- Intercommunality: Saulnois

Government
  - Mayor (2020–2026): Jean-Pierre Aumonier
- Area^{1}: 4.88 km^{2} (1.88 sq mi)
- Elevation: 300 m (980 ft)
- Highest elevation: 400 m (1,300 ft)
- Lowest elevation: 224 m (735 ft)
- Population (2023): 99
  - Density: 20/km^{2} (53/sq mi)
- Time zone: UTC+01:00 (CET)
  - Summer (DST): UTC+02:00 (CEST)
- INSEE/Postal code: 57755 /57590
- ^{1} French Land Register data, which excludes lakes, ponds, glaciers > 1 km^{2} (0.386 sq mi or 247 acres) and river estuaries.

Xocourt (French pronunciation: [ʃokuʁ], from Lorrain; German: Schollhofen) is a commune in the Moselle department in Grand Est in north-eastern France.

== Population ==
Historical population
Year	Pop.	±% p.a.
1968	62	—
1975	53	−2.22%
1982	46	−2.00%
1990	40	−1.73%
1999	49	+2.28%
2007	74	+5.29%
2012	82	+2.07%
2017	93	+2.55%
2023	99	+1.05%
Source: INSEE

== See also ==
- Communes of the Moselle department
