= Malaucourt-sur-Seille =

- Commune
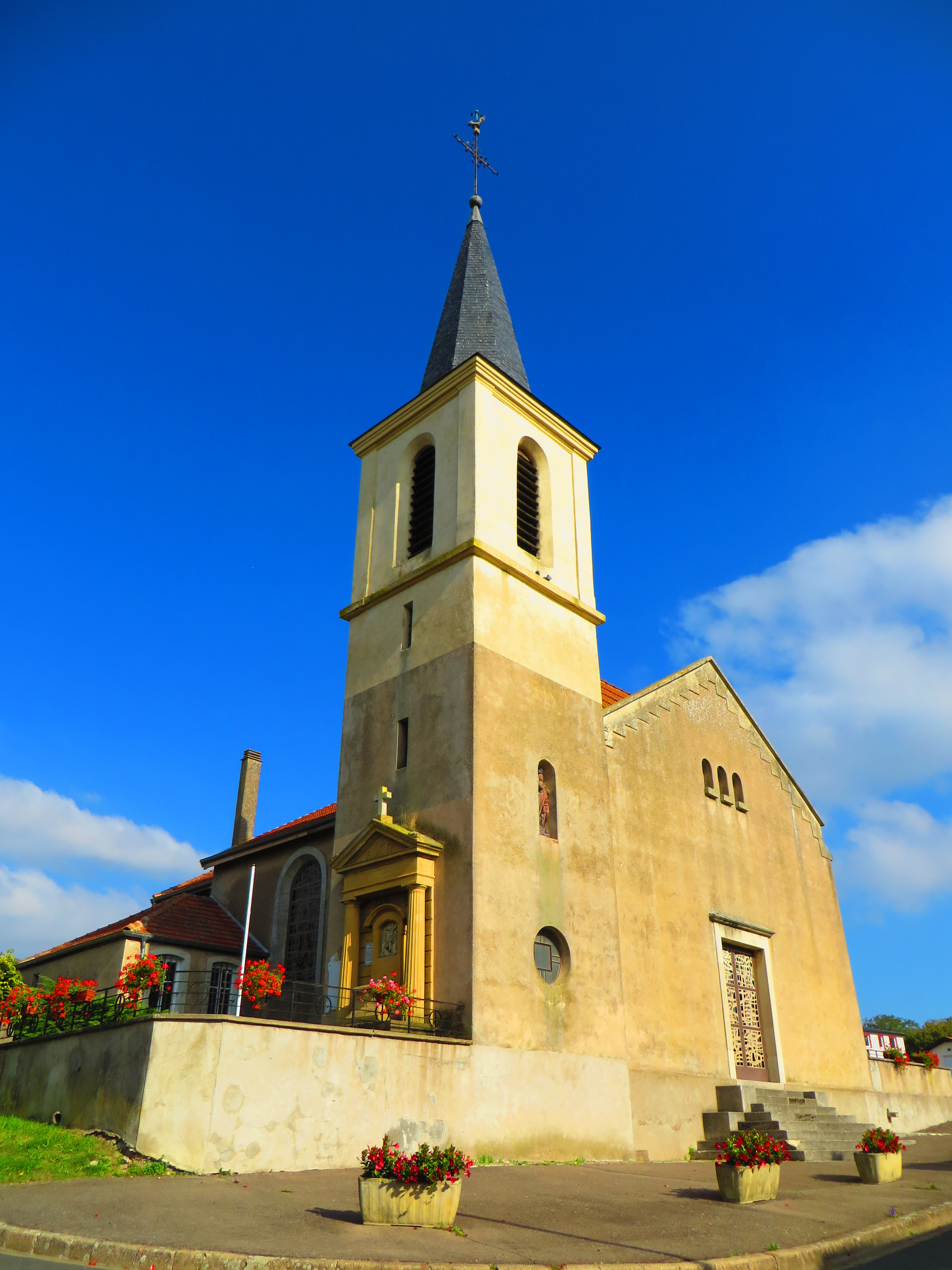
- The church in Malaucourt-sur-Seille

- Coat of arms
- Location of Malaucourt-sur-Seille
- Location within France Location within Grand Est
- Coordinates: 48°50′30″N 6°21′34″E
- Country: France
- Region: Grand Est
- Department: Moselle
- Arrondissement: Sarrebourg-Château-Salins
- Canton: Le Saulnois
- Intercommunality: CC du Saulnois

Government
  - Mayor (2020–2026): Maurice Jacquemin
- Area^{1}: 7.17 km^{2} (2.77 sq mi)
- Elevation: 260 m (850 ft)
- Highest elevation: 276 m (906 ft)
- Lowest elevation: 191 m (627 ft)
- Population (2023): 130
  - Density: 18/km^{2} (47/sq mi)
- Time zone: UTC+01:00 (CET)
  - Summer (DST): UTC+02:00 (CEST)
- INSEE/Postal code: 57436 /57590
- ^{1} French Land Register data, which excludes lakes, ponds, glaciers > 1 km^{2} (0.386 sq mi or 247 acres) and river estuaries.

Malaucourt-sur-Seille (French pronunciation: [malokuʁ syʁ sɛj], literally Malaucourt on Seille; German: Mallhofen) is a commune in the Moselle department in Grand Est in north-eastern France.

== See also ==
- Communes of the Moselle department
