= Tincry =

- Commune
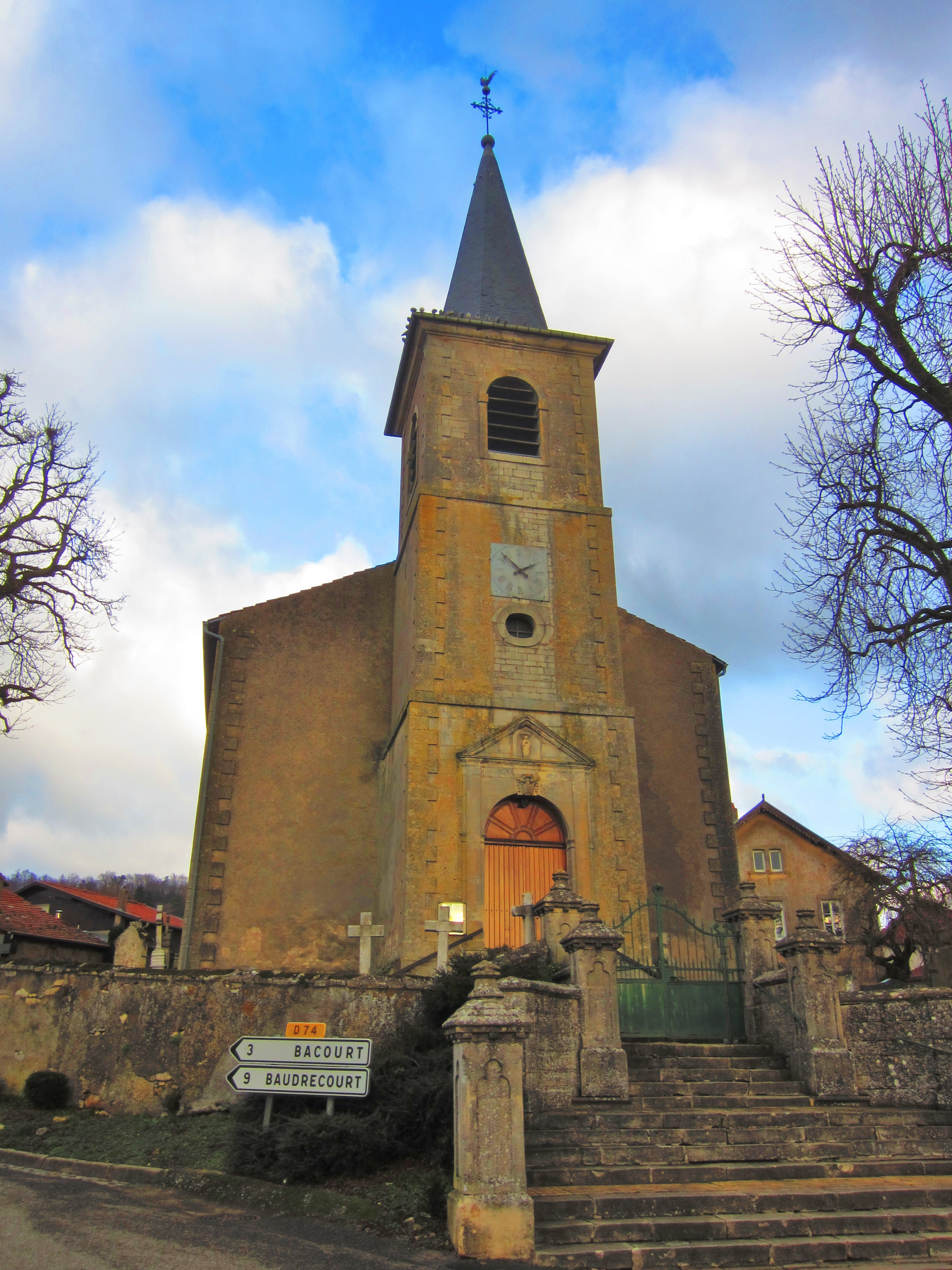
- The church in Tincry

- Coat of arms
- Location of Tincry
- Location within France Location within Grand Est
- Coordinates: 48°54′14″N 6°24′39″E
- Country: France
- Region: Grand Est
- Department: Moselle
- Arrondissement: Sarrebourg-Château-Salins
- Canton: Le Saulnois
- Intercommunality: CC du Saulnois

Government
  - Mayor (2020–2026): Gil Dussoul
- Area^{1}: 8.47 km^{2} (3.27 sq mi)
- Elevation: 250 m (820 ft)
- Highest elevation: 378 m (1,240 ft)
- Lowest elevation: 226 m (741 ft)
- Population (2023): 169
  - Density: 20.0/km^{2} (51.7/sq mi)
- Time zone: UTC+01:00 (CET)
  - Summer (DST): UTC+02:00 (CEST)
- INSEE/Postal code: 57674 /57590
- ^{1} French Land Register data, which excludes lakes, ponds, glaciers > 1 km^{2} (0.386 sq mi or 247 acres) and river estuaries.

Tincry (French pronunciation: [tɛ̃kʁi]; German: Dinkirch) is a commune in the Moselle department in Grand Est in north-eastern France.

== See also ==
- Communes of the Moselle department
