= 328th Infantry Regiment =

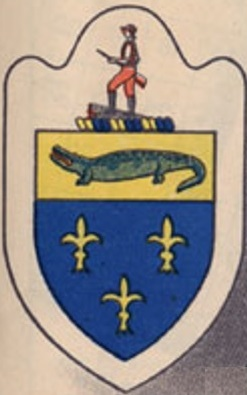
- From 1946's History of the 328th Infantry Regiment
- Active: 1917-1919 (Army); 1921-1943 (Reserve); 1943-1946 (Army)
- Country: United States
- Branch: United States Army; Organized Reserve Corps
- Type: Infantry
- Size: Regiment
- Engagements: World War I World War II
- Decorations: Medal of Honor (2)

Commanders
- Notable commanders: Julian Robert Lindsey

The 328th Infantry Regiment was a unit of the United States Army. Organized during World War I as part of the 82nd Division, the regiment took part in combat in France as part of the American Expeditionary Forces. Its most famous member was Sergeant Alvin York, who received the Medal of Honor for heroism near the Decauville railway line of Chatel-Chéhéry as part of the Meuse-Argonne Offensive.

During the years between the world wars, the 328th Infantry was a unit of the Organized Reserve, and was based in Florida. During World War II, the 328th Infantry Regiment was reactivated as part of the 26th Infantry Division, and took part in combat in France, Luxembourg, Germany, and Austria.

After the war, the 328th Infantry performed occupation duty in Linz, Austria. In 1946, the regiment was combined with the 181st Infantry Regiment and the 181st Infantry Regiment was designated a unit of the Massachusetts Army National Guard.

== Distinctive unit insignia ==
The 328th Infantry Regiment’s Distinctive Unit Insignia was designed after its recall to active duty for World War II. The Minuteman at its top recalls the regiment's status as a Reserve unit and symbolizes its readiness to be called up at a moment’s notice. The alligator recalls the 328th Infantry’s years between the world wars when the regiment's headquarters and subordinate companies were located in Florida. The three fleur-de-lis are symbols of the regiment’s most important World War I engagements in France -- its initial battles in Lorraine and the St. Mihiel and Meuse-Argonne offensives.

== World War I ==
=== Creation ===
The 328th Infantry Regiment was organized in the National Army at Camp Gordon, Georgia on August 25, 1917. The 328th was assigned to the 82nd Division, the task organization of which included:

- 82nd Division Headquarters

- 163rd Infantry Brigade

- 325th Infantry Regiment
- 326th Infantry Regiment
- 319th Machine Gun Battalion

- 164th Infantry Brigade

- 327th Infantry Regiment
- 328th Infantry Regiment
- 320th Machine Gun Battalion

- 157th Field Artillery Brigade

- 307th Trench Mortar Battery

- 319th Field Artillery Regiment
- 320th Field Artillery Regiment
- 321st Field Artillery Regiment

- 307th Train Headquarters and Military Police

- 307th Engineer Regiment
- 307th Field Signal Battalion
- 307th Supply Train
- 307th Engineer Train
- 307th Ammunition Train
- 307th Sanitary Train (325th, 326th, 327th, and 328th Ambulance Companies and Field Hospitals)

=== Initial training ===
The 82nd Division's original soldiers, including those in the 328th Infantry, were predominantly from Georgia and nearby states, including Alabama and Tennessee. Its commander was Colonel Julian Robert Lindsey and the second-in-command was Lieutenant Colonel John W. Wright. The regiment's other field grade officers included Major Richard Wetherill, Major G. Edward Buxton Jr., and Major E. Hammond Johnson.

The 82nd's newly created units formed with new soldiers and a cadre of experienced Regular Army noncommissioned officers from the 6th and 17th Infantry Regiments. Company-grade officers (lieutenants and captains) were assigned as soon as they graduated from the Officers' Training Camp held at Fort McPherson. Within two months of the division's creation, the Army began its transition to a wartime footing, and most of the division's now-trained soldiers were reassigned to augment National Guard divisions as they were federalized.

By November 1917, the 82nd Division, to include the 328th Infantry, had been replenished with draftees. The draftees included men from all 48 states, and many were foreign born or first generation Americans, many of whom completed lessons in English as part of their military training. Division commander William P. Burnham remarked that regardless of their country of origin or home state, the men of the 82nd Division were "all Americans" now, which gave rise to the organization's nickname, the All-American Division.

The 328th Infantry and the rest of the 82nd Division completed their training during the winter of 1917-1918, including instruction from British and French soldiers who were veterans of front line combat against the Germans. In April, the division was accepted into federal service and units traveled to Camp Upton, New York, where they completed their final training and preparations prior to transport to France. In late April, units traveled by train to Boston, where they boarded ships including HMS Grampian and HMS Scandinavian. The ships then traveled to New York City, where a convoy was organized for the trip across the Atlantic Ocean.

=== Initial combat in France ===
After arriving in Southampton and Liverpool, the 82nd Division boarded trains for the trip across England, then boarded ships for cross-channel voyage to France, where they arrived in May. After arriving in France, the 328th Infantry moved to positions near Horcelaines and nearby towns, where they prepared to go into combat as part of a larger American forces that augmented British troops in the area. By late June, the 328th Infantry was back under American control and moved to positions in the Toul sector, including the towns of Franchville, Ville St. Etienne, and Lucy. Between June 26 and 29, the 328th performed a relief in place and assumed the positions formally occupied by the 104th Infantry, a unit of the 26th Division. Lindsey was promoted to brigadier general as commander of the 164th Infantry Brigade, and Colonel Hunter B. Nelson succeeded him on June 26.

The 328th manned its positions in the Toul sector until early August, when the 82nd Division was relieved by the 89th Division and moved to reserve positions around the towns of Troussey and Rigny-la-Salle. In mid-August, the 328th Infantry relieved the 6th Marines, and took up positions in towns including Dieulouard and Belleville, as well as the Liverdun woods. In September, the 328th Infantry took part in combat around the town of Norroy as part of the Meuse-Argonne Offensive. Subsequent advances moved the regiment closer to the town of Vandieres, and it sustained numerous casualties. On the 18th, the regiment stopped near Belleville to rest, re-equip, and reorganize. Between September 24 and 26, the regiment moved to the Argonne Forest, and occupied former French positions on the first's southeastern edge. By early October, subsequent advances and relocations found the regiment at a site known as Camp Mahaut, near Apremont. On the night of October 6-7, the regiment marched through Varennes-en-Argonne in the direction of Fléville, where it took up defensive positions and prepared to resume the offensive.

=== End of combat operations ===
On October 7, the 328th Infantry advanced near La Forge, intending to seize key terrain from the Germans and take possession of the area's Decauville railroad. Fighting continued into October 8, and when American forces were prevented from advancing by German machine guns in key locations including one known as Hill 223, a detachment of soldiers from the regiment's Company G attempted to infiltrate German lines and capture them. The detachment of 17 had captured a large group of German soldiers when sudden German fire resulted in nine casualties, leaving Corporal Alvin York in charge of the remainder. York left his men in charge of the prisoners and worked his way into position to attack the machine guns. After York killed several German soldiers with his rifle, and used his pistol to kill six more as they rushed at him, their commander offered to surrender. The Company G detachment returned to the regimental command post with 132 prisoners. The regiment was able to continue its attack towards the railroad and York later received the Medal of Honor. During October 9 and 10 the regiment took part in action near the town of Cornay, after which it occupied a position near the town of Pylone. By October 11, the 328th had been reorganized, and moved into defensive positions near Fléville. The 328th continued to fight through the rest of October, primarily near the town of Sommerance.

On November 1 and 2, the 328th Infantry moved into Camp de Bouzon near Varennes, where they reorganized before moving out for a French camp, Florent, located near Sainte-Menehould. On November 4, the regiment took over positions in Maxey-sur-Vaise, Montigny-devant-Sassey, and Burey-en-Vaux, where they remained on the defensive, rotated soldiers off the front lines for leave in the rear area, and received replacement soldiers to take the places of the killed and wounded. Between November 10 and 18, the 328th Infantry marched to new positions near Dijon. They were in Neufchâteau, Vosges on November 11 when they received word of the Armistice that ended the war.

=== Return to the United States ===
In February 1919, the regiment began its train trip to base camps in western France, where soldiers turned in equipment, completed administrative requirements, and prepared to return to the United States. In early May, the regiment boarded ships for America, including USS Ohioan, Scranton, and Sierra. They arrived in New York Harbor between May 20 and 22, after which they moved to Camp Merritt, New Jersey for demobilization and discharge. By the end of the month, most of the 328th Regiment's members had been discharged and departed for their homes.

=== Campaign participation credit ===
The 328th Infantry Regiment's World War I campaigns included:

- Toul Sector, 25 June-9 August 1918
- Marbache Sector, 17 August-11 September
- St. Mihiel Offensive, 12-16 September
- Meuse-Argonne Offensive, 6 October-31 October

== Post-World War I ==
In 1921, the 82nd Division was re-formed as a unit of the Organized Reserve. The 328th Infantry was part of this Reserve formation, and the headquarters was initiated in November 1921 in Tampa, Florida. Subordinate units were formed in 1922, and initially, the regiment's 1st Battalion was headquartered in Tampa, 2nd Battalion in West Palm Beach, and 3rd Battalion in Pensacola. 1st Battalion's companies were: Company A (Bartow), Company B (Ocala), Company C (Gainesville), and Company D (Lake City). 2nd Battalion's subordinate units were: Company E (Miami), Company F (Orlando), Company G (Daytona), and Company H (Jacksonville). Companies assigned to 3rd Battalion included: Company I (Chipley), Company K (Blountstown), Company L (Tallahassee), and Company M (Live Oak). The entire regiment was relocated on 22 October 1929 to Tampa.

During the interwar years, units of the 328th Infantry performed individual training at weeknight and weekend assemblies at the armory of the Florida National Guard's 116th Field Artillery in Tampa, and unit training during annual two-week encampments with the 8th or 22nd Infantry Regiments at Fort Screven and Fort McPherson, Georgia, or Fort McClellan, Alabama. An alternate form of summer training was conducting the Citizens Military Training Camps at Fort Screven or Fort Moultrie, South Carolina. The regiment's primary ROTC "feeder" school for new Reserve lieutenants was the University of Florida in Gainesville.

== World War II ==
=== Activation ===
On 13 February 1942, the 82nd Division was converted from a "square" to a "triangular" division on paper prior to being ordered to active duty, and the 328th Infantry was relieved from assignment to the division and concurrently allotted to the Army of the United States as an inactive unit. The 328th Infantry was assigned as a subordinate unit of the 26th Infantry Division on 27 January 1943. It was ordered into active federal service on 12 February 1943 and began training at Fort Jackson, South Carolina, with Colonel William F. Bigelow as its commander. Training continued at several locations in the eastern United States until August 1944, to include: Camp Gordon, Georgia; Camp Campbell, Kentucky; 1944’s Tennessee Maneuvers; and Camp Shanks, New York.

=== Combat in France ===
The regiment departed for France by ship in late August, and disembarked at Utah Beach on September 7 and 8. After remaining in a reserve staging area until early October to complete additional training and receive equipment and supplies, the regiment began combat operations as part of the 26th Infantry Division. The division was assigned to Third U.S. Army, and entered combat near Port-sur-Seille. On October 8, the 328th Infantry augmented the 80th Infantry Division’s attacks on Clémery and nearby Bénicourt. After a motor march to Bezange-la-Grande, near Nancy, units of the 328th Infantry took part in combat near Vic-sur-Seille, then relieved the 104th Infantry Regiment in defensive positions near the Moncourt Woods.

In November, the regiment took part in combat as the Third Army resumed the offensive, taking part in engagements Bezange-la-Petite, the Moncourt woods, and the town of Moncourt, which the 328th Infantry captured from the Germans. In combat near Wuisse on November 12, regimental commander Colonel Ben R. Jacobs was wounded and evacuated. Jacobs returned to the unit on November 18, and the next day it resumed offensive operations, capturing the towns and cities of Kerprich-aux-Bois, Guebestroff, Dieuze, Munster, Givrycourt, Vittersbourg, and Honskirch by November 27.

=== Belgium and Luxembourg ===
In early December, the 328th Infantry advanced on the Siegfried Line, cleared the woods between Honskirch and Herbitzheim, and captured Herbitzheim. On December 6, the regiment captured Weidesheim and Bining. On December 13, the regiment was relieved by units of the 87th Infantry Division and moved to Metz for rest and re-equipping.

On December 17, 1944, during the Battle of the Bulge, soldiers from the Waffen-SS gunned down 84 American prisoners at the Baugnez crossroads near the town of Malmedy. When news of the killings spread among American forces, it aroused great anger among frontline troops. The 328th Infantry Regiment issued orders that "no SS troops or paratroopers will be taken prisoner but will be shot on sight."

On December 20, 1944, the 328th moved from Metz to Arlon in Belgium as part of Third Army’s change of direction from east to north in order to respond to the German offensive known as the Battle of the Bulge. On December 23, the 328th Infantry attacked the Germans in the vicinity of the Arsdorf Forest in Luxembourg and captured Wahl and Brattert. Between December 24 and 26, the regiment cleared and occupied Arsdorf, Kuborn, Neunhausen, Eschdorf, Insenborn, Bonnal, and Lultzhausen. On December 27, Colonel Jacobs was evacuated because of ill health, and temporarily replaced by his executive officer, Paul Hamilton.

On January 3, 3rd Battalion, 328th Infantry was attached to the 101st Infantry regiment for an assault on some nearby woods, after which the 328th Infantry relieved the 101st Infantry in its defensive positions. On January 10, the regiment resumed the offensive, and seized the high ground overlooking the Wiltz River, after which it relieved the 90th Infantry Division near Doncols. The 328th Infantry attached on January 14 and captured Grummelscheid and Brachtenbach. On the 22nd, the regiment captured Selscheid, Knaphoscheid, and Kleinhoscheid. From January 24 to 26, the 328th Infantry advanced to the Clerve River, secured crossings, and secured the towns of Fischbach, Kochery, and Urspelt. On January 26, the regiment seized its objectives overlooking the Siegfried Line, was relieved by units of the 6th Armored Division, and established the regimental command post at Überherrn.

=== Fighting in Germany ===
On February 12, the 328th Infantry relieved the 101st Infantry Regiment at Saarlautern and resumed offensive activities. An attack near Saarlautern captured 10 German soldiers, after which the regiment continued fighting in Saarlautern and nearby Fraulautern through February 24. On February 24 and 25, the 328th Infantry was relieved by the 101st Infantry. After resting and reorganizing, on March 5 the regiment conducted a motor march to Serrig, Germany, where on March 6 it relieved the 301st Infantry Regiment, a unit of the 94th Infantry Division.

On March 13, the 328th Infantry resumed the offensive. Hamilton was evacuated because of illness and replaced as commander by Lieutenant Colonel Aloysius O'Flaherty. On March 16 and 17, the regiment captured six more towns. On March 23, the regiment took over the Mainz sector of the American lines from units of the 90th Infantry Division. On March 25, the 328th Infantry was relieved by the 16th Cavalry Group, moved to Oppenheim, and crossed the Rhine. On March 26, the regiment was attached to the 4th Armored Division, and took part in establishing a defensive line along the Main River. Back on the offensive on March 28, the regiment captured five more German towns by the 29th. On March 30, the 328th captured 12 more towns as the Allied offensive into Germany continued to gather momentum.

On April 1, the 328th Infantry advanced through eight more towns as German resistance became sporadic. On April 4, the regiment cleared the North Fulda Woods of German resistance and captured four nearby towns. After capturing 12 more towns and cities on April 4 and 5, on April 7 the 328th Infantry relieved the 101st Infantry Regiment near Suhl. Resuming the offense on April 8, the 328th captured 15 more towns by April 15, and reached its objective near the towns of Tettau and Neuenbau. On April 18, the regiment was relieved by units of the 90th Infantry Division, then was transported to Berner. On April 19, the 328th Infantry attacked behind the 11th Armored Division's advance and captured five more towns. On 24 April 1945, a reconnaissance patrol from Company I engaged German defenders near Nittenau, Germany. During the engagement, enemy forces deployed tanks and machine guns against the patrol. The unit returned to friendly lines without loss and brought back 42 prisoners of war. Sergeant James G. O’Brien was awarded the Bronze Star Medal for his actions during the mission. On the 25th, soldiers of the 328th captured German field marshal Ewald von Kleist. On April 26, resistance in the towns of Egg an der Günz and Metten fell to the 328th's advance, and on the 27th the regiment cleared the town of Deggendorf. The regiment cleared 11 more towns of German resistance between April 28 and 30.

=== Final combat in Austria ===
On May 2, the 328th Infantry defeated resistance in the towns of Kelberg and Bad Peterstal-Griesbach. Attached to the 11th Armored Division for combat operations on May 5, the regiment advanced into Austria and took part in clearing Urfahr and Linz of enemy resistance. On May 8, Germany surrendered unconditionally. By the time the regiment ended its combat operations, Colonel Dwight T. Colley, formerly the regiment's executive officer had been appointed as its commander. Following Germany's surrender, the 328th Infantry Regiment performed post-war occupation duty in Linz.

=== Casualties ===
During its World War II service, the 328th Infantry sustained 489 killed in action and 64 who died of their wounds. 630 were seriously wounded, with another 20 seriously injured. 1,287 were slightly wounded, with 536 categorized as slightly injured. Twenty 328th Infantry Regiment soldiers were listed as missing in action at the end of the war.

=== Honors and decorations ===
The regiment's World War II campaign participation credit included Northern France, Ardennes, Rhineland, and Central Europe. Soldiers of the 328th Infantry Regiment received one Medal of Honor, nine Distinguished Service Crosses, and 189 Silver Stars. The recipient of the Medal of Honor was Alfred L. Wilson, a medic who was wounded in combat at Bezange-la-Petite in November 1944, but refused to be evacuated and continued to treat the wounded until he fell unconscious. Wilson later died as a result of his wounds, and his heroism was credited with saving the lives of at least 10 soldiers.

== Post-World War II ==
The 328th Infantry was consolidated with the 181st Infantry Regiment on July 8, 1946. The consolidated unit was designated 181st Infantry Regiment, 26th Infantry Division, a unit of the Massachusetts Army National Guard.

== Notable members ==
=== World War I ===
- G. Edward Buxton Jr., Assistant Director of the Office of Strategic Services during World War II
- Hammond Johnson, college football and baseball coach
- Julian Robert Lindsey, U.S. Army major general
- Alvin York, Medal of Honor recipient

=== World War II ===
- Alfred L. Wilson, Medal of Honor recipient

== Memorials ==
In 1933, World War I veterans of the 328th Infantry dedicated a memorial at Camp Gordon. In 1960, the 328th Infantry memorial was moved to Fort Bragg, North Carolina, the home of the 82nd Airborne Division. The 6-feet long by 3-feet high granite boulder is located near Building C-6841 at 5108 Ardennes Street. It features the 82nd Division's well known red, white, and blue "AA" shoulder sleeve insignia, along with an inscription dedicating the memorial to members of the regiment who died during World War I.

In 2016, the people of the village of Albestroff in northeastern France dedicated a plaque in memory of Fred W. Brown, a 328th Infantry soldier who was killed in action on November 19, 1944 during fighting to liberate the village from Nazi occupation. The black granite marker is mounted on the wall of a home on the east side of Rue du Château, at the place where Brown died.

== Sources ==
=== Books ===
- 328th Infantry Regiment Historical Committee (1920). History of Three Hundred and Twenty-Eighth Regiment of Infantry. Atlanta, GA: Foote & Davis – via Internet Archive.
- Cooke, James J. (1999). The All-Americans at War: The 82nd Division in the Great War, 1917-1918. Westport, CT: Praeger. ISBN 978-0-2759-5740-7 – via Google Books.
- Theise, Jerome J., ed. (1946). History of the 328th Infantry Regiment. Linz, Austria: 328th Infantry Regiment (Printer: Verlagsdruckerei, Weis, Austria) – via ibiblio.
- U.S. Department of War (1920). Battle Participation of Organizations of the American Expeditionary Forces. Washington, DC: U.S. Government Printing Office – via Internet Archive.

=== Internet ===
- Center of Military History (May 6, 2015). "Lineage and Honors Information, 181st Infantry Regiment". History.army.mil. Arlington, VA: U.S. Army. Archived from the original on April 28, 2013.
- Patrick, Bethanne Kelly (8 November 2017). "Army Tech 5 Alfred L. Wilson". Military.com. San Francisco, CA: Military Advantage.
- "328th Infantry AEF Memorial". Commemorative Landscapes of North Carolina. Chapel Hill, NC: University of North Carolina Library. 19 March 2010.
- "Fred W. Brown Plaque". uswarmemorials.org. Wilmington, DE: American War Memorials Overseas, Inc. 2016.

=== Newspapers ===
- "Organize Reserves". St. Petersburg Times. St. Petersburg, FL. August 2, 1922 – via Newspapers.com.
- "Many Tampans in Command of Reserve Units". Tampa Times. Tampa, FL. December 1, 1923 – via Newspapers.com.
- "Florida Regiment to Train in Georgia". The News-Press. Fort Myers, FL. August 4, 1925 – via Newspapers.com.
- "18 County Men Are Called By Reserve Camp". Tampa Times. Tampa, FL. June 2, 1926 – via Newspapers.com.
- "Officers Due Here By Air for Banquet". Tampa Times. Tampa, FL. September 1, 1927 – via Newspapers.com.
