= Alfred L. Wilson =

U.S. Army Medal of Honor recipient

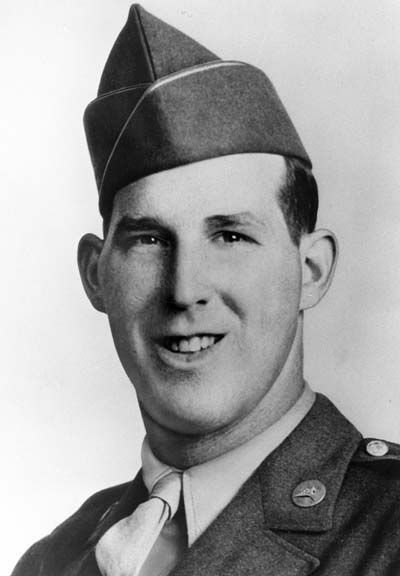
- Wilson in uniform, c. 1943
- Born: September 18, 1919; Fairchance, Pennsylvania, U.S.
- Died: November 8, 1944 (aged 25); Near Bezange-la-Petite, France
- Burial place: Maple Grove Cemetery, Fairchance, Pennsylvania, U.S. 39°49′11.5″N 79°45′55.4″W
- Military career
- Branch: United States Army
- Service years: 1943–1944
- Rank: Technician 5th Grade
- Service number: 33429521
- Units: Medical Detachment, 328th Infantry, 26th Infantry Division
- Campaigns: World War II; Northern France; Rhineland †
- Awards: Medal of Honor; Purple Heart

Technician 5th Grade Alfred Leonard Wilson (September 18, 1919 – November 8, 1944) was a United States Army soldier who received the Medal of Honor for his heroic actions during World War II.

== Biography ==
Alfred Leonard Wilson joined the United States Army in March 1943 and by November 8, 1944, was serving as a Technician 5th Grade with the Medical Detachment of the 328th Infantry, 26th Infantry Division. During a firefight on that day, near Bezange-la-Petite, France, Wilson was severely wounded but refused evacuation and continued to treat other injured soldiers until he fell unconscious. He died of his wounds and was posthumously awarded the Medal of Honor seven months later, on June 18, 1945. Aged 25 at his death, Wilson was buried at Maple Grove Cemetery in Fairchance, Pennsylvania.

== Medal of Honor citation ==

He volunteered to assist as an aid man a company other than his own, which was suffering casualties from constant artillery fire. He administered to the wounded and returned to his own company when a shellburst injured a number of its men. While treating his comrades he was seriously wounded, but refused to be evacuated by litter bearers sent to relieve him. In spite of great pain and loss of blood, he continued to administer first aid until he was too weak to stand. Crawling from one patient to another, he continued his work until excessive loss of blood prevented him from moving. He then verbally directed unskilled enlisted men in continuing the first aid for the wounded. Still refusing assistance himself, he remained to instruct others in dressing the wounds of his comrades until he was unable to speak above a whisper and finally lapsed into unconsciousness. The effects of his injury later caused his death. By steadfastly remaining at the scene without regard for his own safety, Cpl. Wilson through distinguished devotion to duty and personal sacrifice helped to save the lives of at least 10 wounded men.

== Legacy ==
Wilson Barracks (German: Kirchberg-Kaserne), also known as Landstuhl Regional Medical Center, in Landstuhl, Germany, is named in honor of him.

== See also ==
- List of Medal of Honor recipients
- List of Medal of Honor recipients for World War II
- List of people from Pennsylvania
