= Norroy =

- Commune
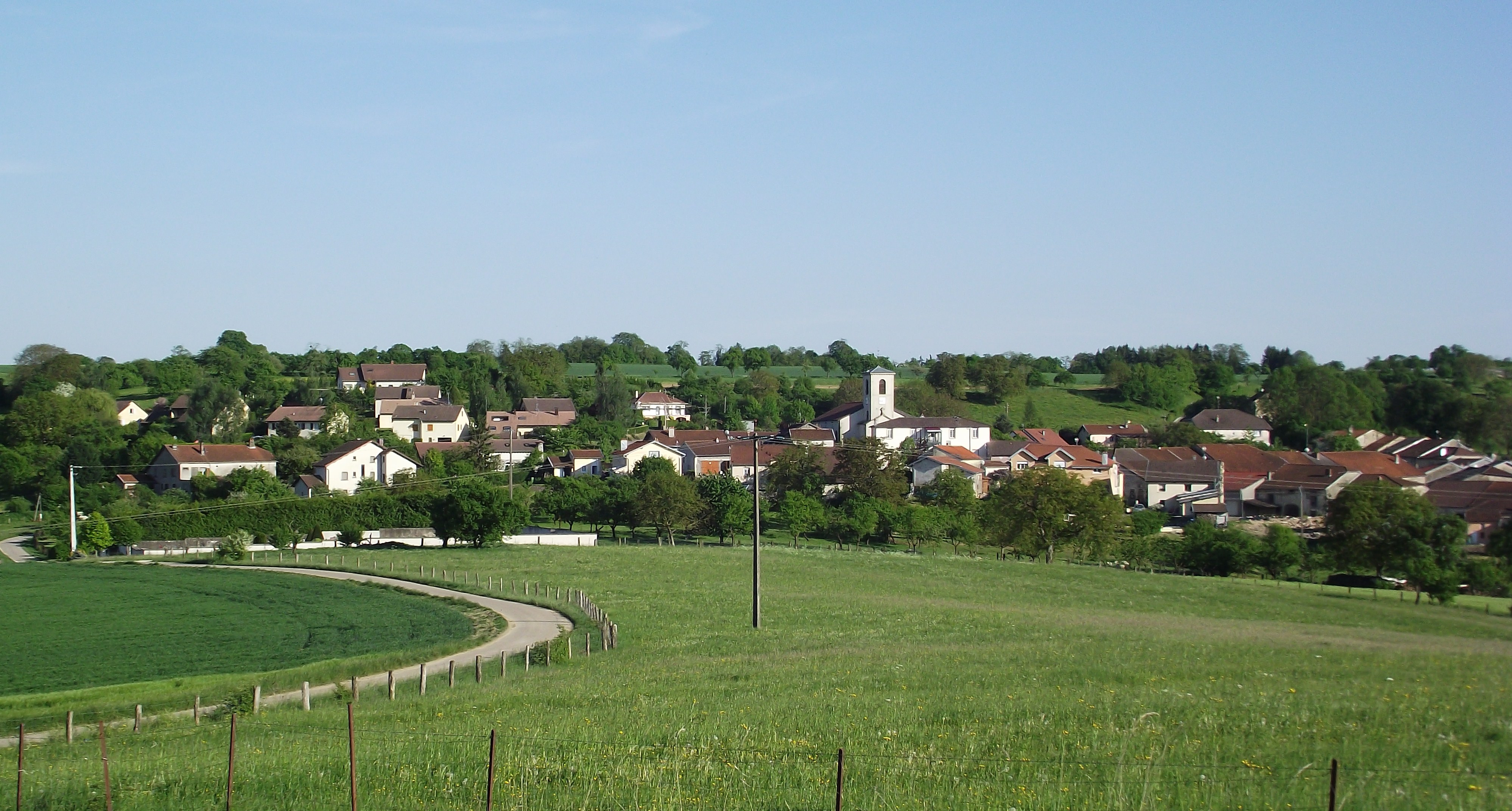
- A general view of Norroy

- Coat of arms
- Location of Norroy
- Location within France Location within Grand Est
- Coordinates: 48°12′59″N 5°55′15″E
- Country: France
- Region: Grand Est
- Department: Vosges
- Arrondissement: Neufchâteau
- Canton: Vittel
- Intercommunality: CC Terre d'eau

Government
  - Mayor (2020–2026): Jean-Pierre Didier
- Area^{1}: 7.22 km^{2} (2.79 sq mi)
- Highest elevation: 454 m (1,490 ft)
- Lowest elevation: 323 m (1,060 ft)
- Population (2023): 203
  - Density: 28.1/km^{2} (72.8/sq mi)
- Time zone: UTC+01:00 (CET)
  - Summer (DST): UTC+02:00 (CEST)
- INSEE/Postal code: 88332 /88800
- ^{1} French Land Register data, which excludes lakes, ponds, glaciers > 1 km^{2} (0.386 sq mi or 247 acres) and river estuaries.

Norroy (French pronunciation: [nɔʁwa], also: Norroy-sur-Vair) is a commune in the Vosges department in Grand Est in northeastern France. Inhabitants are called Nogarésiens.

== Geography ==
Norroy is positioned 5 kilometres (3 mi) to the north-west of Vittel on a plateau that separates the rivers Vair and Petit Vair (Little Vair). The highest point, in the south of the commune, is at 454 meters in the Châtillon Woods (Bois de Châtillon).

== History ==
The commune of Norroy contained a command post which must have been given to the Knights Templar by the Count of Vaudémont. In the later medieval period revenues from the commune were split, two thirds going to the Dukes of Lorraine and one third to the Templar Commander at Robécourt. In 1751 the commune was subject to the bailiwick of Bourmont, and it was part of the Lamarche District under the post-Rrench Revolution administrative structure in place between 1790 and 1800.

In terms of church administration, Norroy-sur-Vair was an annex to the parish of Mandres-sur-Vair, under the care of the presbytery at Bulgnéville.

== See also ==
- Communes of the Vosges department
