= Edward Buxton =

Edward Buxton may refer to:

- Sir Edward Buxton, 2nd Baronet (1812–1858), Member of Parliament for Essex South
- Edward Buxton (conservationist) (1840–1924), his son, Member of Parliament for Walthamstow 1885–1886 and a conservationist
- G. Edward Buxton Jr. (1880–1949), United States Army officer
