= Cornay =

- Commune
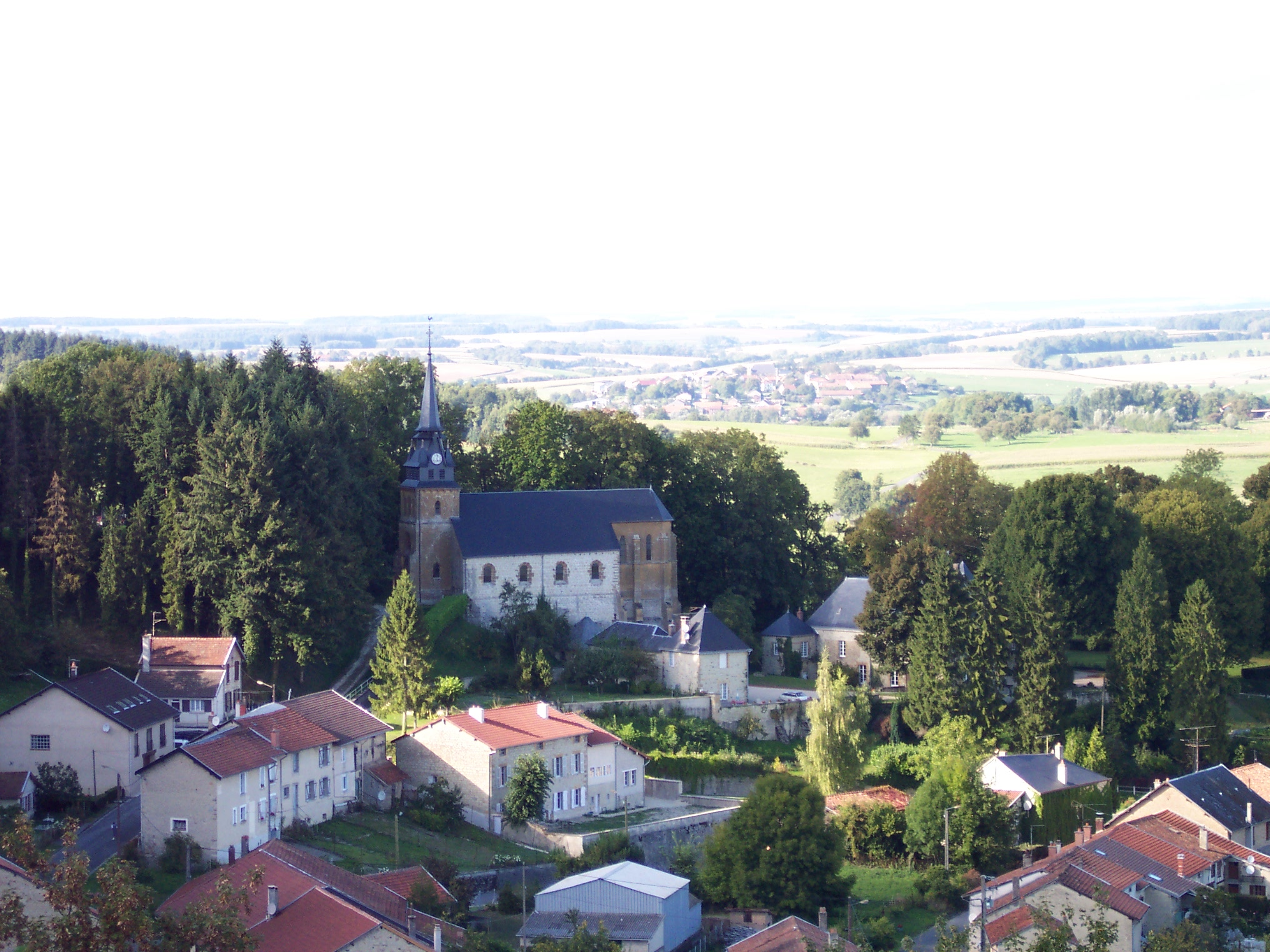
- A general view of Cornay

- Coat of arms
- Location of Cornay
- Location within France Location within Grand Est
- Coordinates: 49°18′09″N 4°57′00″E
- Country: France
- Region: Grand Est
- Department: Ardennes
- Arrondissement: Vouziers
- Canton: Attigny
- Intercommunality: Argonne Ardennaise

Government
  - Mayor (2020–2026): Jean de Pouilly
- Area^{1}: 10.94 km^{2} (4.22 sq mi)
- Elevation: 190 m (620 ft)
- Highest elevation: 246 m (807 ft)
- Lowest elevation: 122 m (400 ft)
- Population (2023): 69
  - Density: 6.3/km^{2} (16/sq mi)
- Time zone: UTC+01:00 (CET)
  - Summer (DST): UTC+02:00 (CEST)
- INSEE/Postal code: 08131 /08250
- ^{1} French Land Register data, which excludes lakes, ponds, glaciers > 1 km^{2} (0.386 sq mi or 247 acres) and river estuaries.

Cornay (French pronunciation: [kɔʁnɛ]) is a commune in the Ardennes department in northern France.

== World War I ==
On 8 October 1918, in the Argonne Forest (49.28558°N 4.95242°E), Cornay was the scene of particularly heavy fighting. The 82nd US Infantry Division launched a series of attacks in the area, with 1st Battalion, 328 Infantry regiment (82nd Division) attacking to liberate Cornay and 2nd Battalion, 328th Infantry Regiment attacking into the Argonne Forest through Chatel Chehery (south of Cornay). Around 10:30 am, the German 125th Landwehr Wuerttemberg Regiment and 212th Prussian Reserve Regiment launched a determined counterattack against the American forces, which inflicted heavy casualties on the Americans, with more than 100 being captured. The 82nd Division was forced to retreat from Cornay. The town was retaken by the Americans the next day. Three kilometers to the south, Cpl Alvin C. York from Company G, 328th Infantry Regiment, 82nd Infantry Division, with the aid of 7 other soldiers, captured 132 German soldiers. For his actions York was awarded the US Medal of Honor.

== Population ==
Historical population
| Year | Pop. | ±% p.a. |
|---|---|---|
| 1968 | 117 | — |
| 1975 | 98 | −2.50% |
| 1982 | 96 | −0.29% |
| 1990 | 90 | −0.80% |
| 1999 | 86 | −0.50% |
| 2007 | 78 | −1.21% |
| 2012 | 79 | +0.26% |
| 2017 | 63 | −4.43% |
| 2023 | 69 | +1.53% |
Source: INSEE

== See also ==
- Communes of the Ardennes department
