= Suriauville =

- Commune
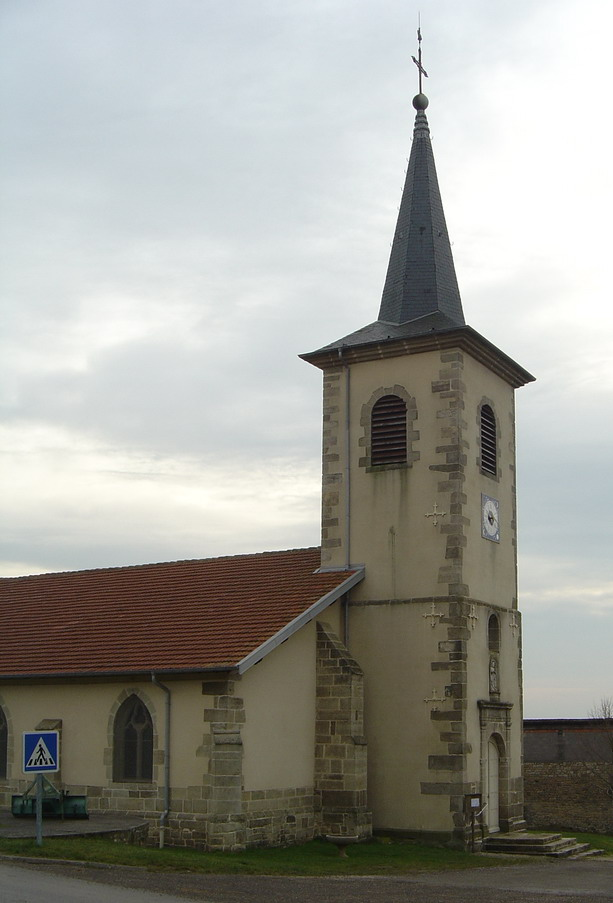
- Saint-Blaise
- Location of Suriauville
- Location within France Location within Grand Est
- Coordinates: 48°10′09″N 5°51′51″E
- Country: France
- Region: Grand Est
- Department: Vosges
- Arrondissement: Neufchâteau
- Canton: Vittel
- Intercommunality: CC Terre d'eau

Government
  - Mayor (2020–2026): Pedro Chaves
- Area^{1}: 13.44 km^{2} (5.19 sq mi)
- Elevation: 356 m (1,168 ft)
- Highest elevation: 484 m (1,588 ft)
- Lowest elevation: 345 m (1,132 ft)
- Population (2023): 200
  - Density: 15/km^{2} (39/sq mi)
- Time zone: UTC+01:00 (CET)
  - Summer (DST): UTC+02:00 (CEST)
- INSEE/Postal code: 88461 /88140
- ^{1} French Land Register data, which excludes lakes, ponds, glaciers > 1 km^{2} (0.386 sq mi or 247 acres) and river estuaries.

Suriauville (French pronunciation: [syʁjovil]) is a commune in the Vosges department in Grand Est in northeastern France.

== See also ==
- Communes of the Vosges department
