= Mandres-sur-Vair =

- Commune
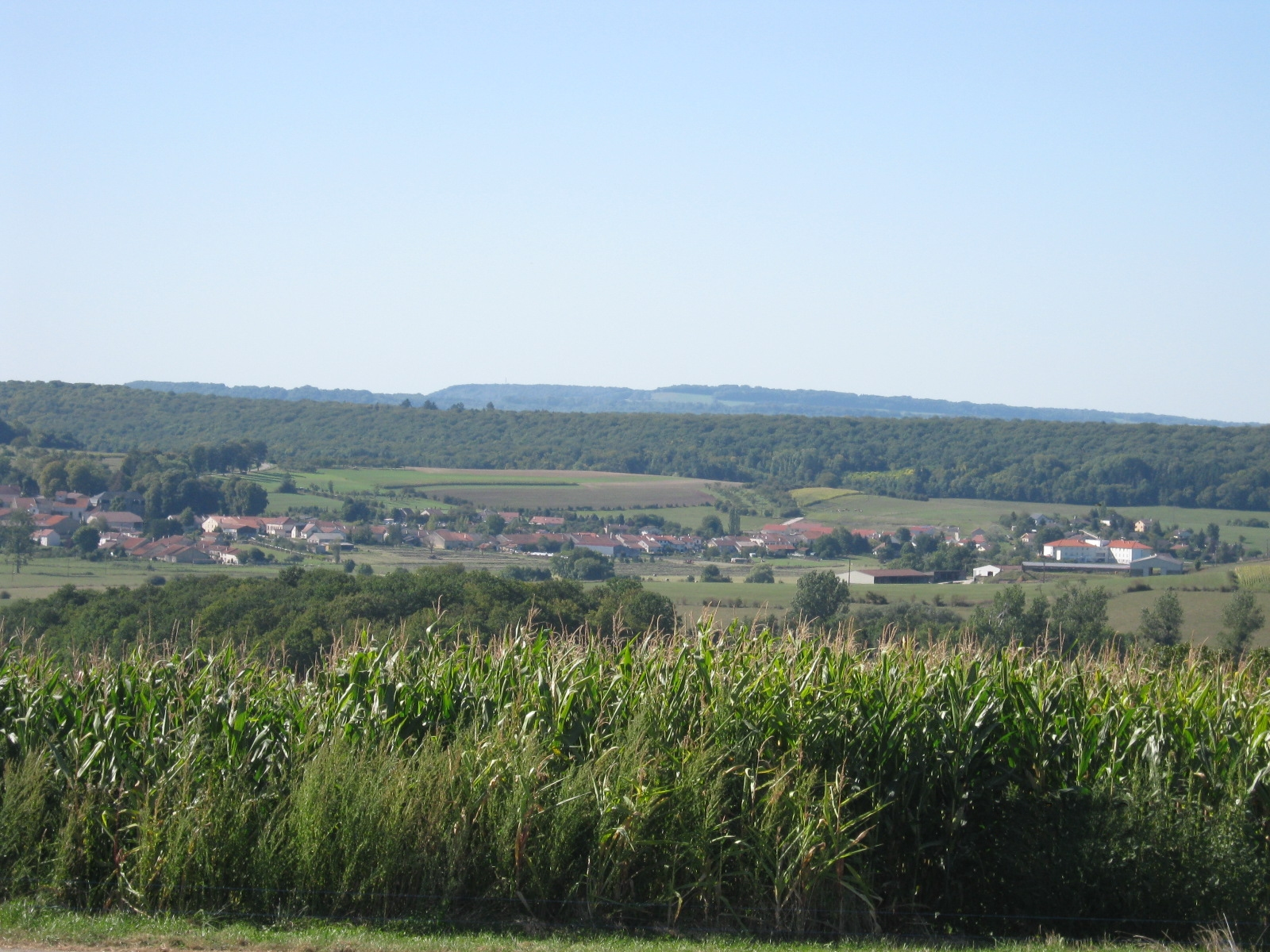
- A general view of Mandres-sur-Vair

- Coat of arms
- Location of Mandres-sur-Vair
- Location within France Location within Grand Est
- Coordinates: 48°13′29″N 5°53′36″E
- Country: France
- Region: Grand Est
- Department: Vosges
- Arrondissement: Neufchâteau
- Canton: Vittel
- Intercommunality: CC Terre d'eau

Government
  - Mayor (2020–2026): Daniel Thiriat
- Area^{1}: 11.93 km^{2} (4.61 sq mi)
- Elevation: 340 m (1,120 ft)
- Highest elevation: 421 m (1,381 ft)
- Lowest elevation: 319 m (1,047 ft)
- Population (2023): 421
  - Density: 35.3/km^{2} (91.4/sq mi)
- Time zone: UTC+01:00 (CET)
  - Summer (DST): UTC+02:00 (CEST)
- INSEE/Postal code: 88285 /88000
- ^{1} French Land Register data, which excludes lakes, ponds, glaciers > 1 km^{2} (0.386 sq mi or 247 acres) and river estuaries.

Mandres-sur-Vair (French pronunciation: [mɑ̃dʁ syʁ vɛʁ], literally Mandres on Vair) is a commune in the Vosges département in Grand Est in northeastern France.

Inhabitants are called Mandrions.

== Unusual feature ==
The private school "Bienheureux Frassati" opened to students in 2007. The school, which takes its name from Pier Giorgio Frassati, is a traditional Roman Catholic school for boys, installed in a former château.

== See also ==
- Communes of the Vosges department
