= Maxey-sur-Meuse =

- Commune
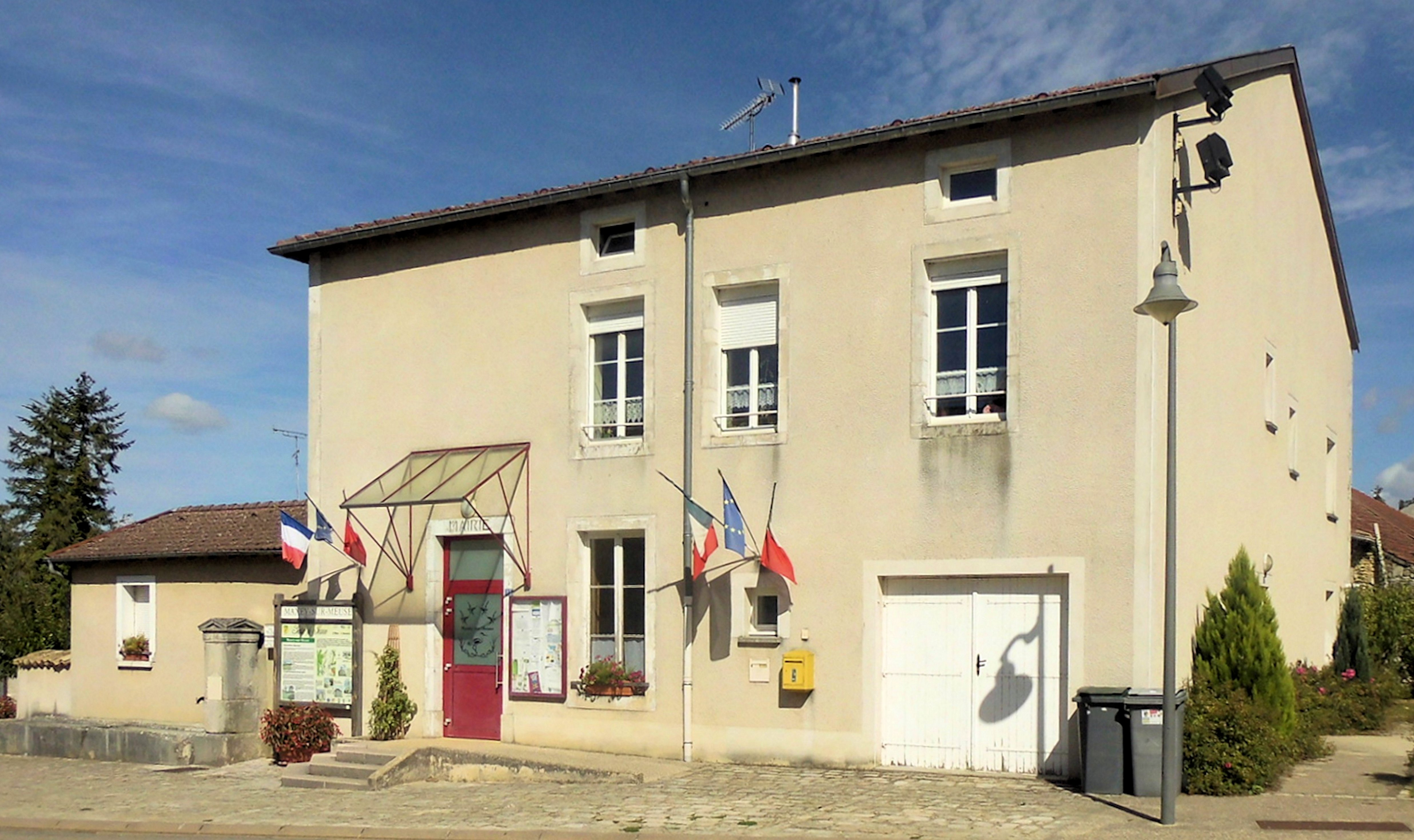
- The town hall in Maxey-sur-Meuse
- Location of Maxey-sur-Meuse
- Location within France Location within Grand Est
- Coordinates: 48°27′06″N 5°41′54″E
- Country: France
- Region: Grand Est
- Department: Vosges
- Arrondissement: Neufchâteau
- Canton: Neufchâteau
- Intercommunality: CC Ouest Vosgien

Government
  - Mayor (2020–2026): Pascal Jacquinet
- Area^{1}: 10.77 km^{2} (4.16 sq mi)
- Elevation: 269 m (883 ft)
- Highest elevation: 428 m (1,404 ft)
- Lowest elevation: 265 m (869 ft)
- Population (2023): 213
  - Density: 19.8/km^{2} (51.2/sq mi)
- Time zone: UTC+01:00 (CET)
  - Summer (DST): UTC+02:00 (CEST)
- INSEE/Postal code: 88293 /88630
- ^{1} French Land Register data, which excludes lakes, ponds, glaciers > 1 km^{2} (0.386 sq mi or 247 acres) and river estuaries.

Maxey-sur-Meuse (French pronunciation: [maksɛ syʁ møz], literally Maxey on Meuse) is a commune in the Vosges department in Grand Est in northeastern France.

Confusingly, the similarly named commune of Maxey-sur-Vaise in the adjacent Meuse département is only 10 kilometres (6 mi) away, to the north.

== Geography ==
Maxey-sur-Meuse is positioned in the north-west of the Vosges département, on the departmental frontier with the Meuse département. Neufchâteau is 13 kilometres (8 mi) away to the south. To the north east are Toul (34 kilometres / 21 miles) and Nancy (51 kilometres / 33 miles). Maxey is across the river Meuse from a road junction where traffic bound for Commercy continues in a northerly direction (RD964) while traffic for Bar-le-Duc turns to the north-west (RD966)

The (here relatively small) river Meuse flows through Maxey where it is joined by the waters from the Vair and three smaller streams, the Roises, the Vau and the Blanchonrupt. The presence of all these water courses makes the village popular with anglers.

== See also ==
- Communes of the Vosges department
