= Bezange-la-Grande =

- Commune
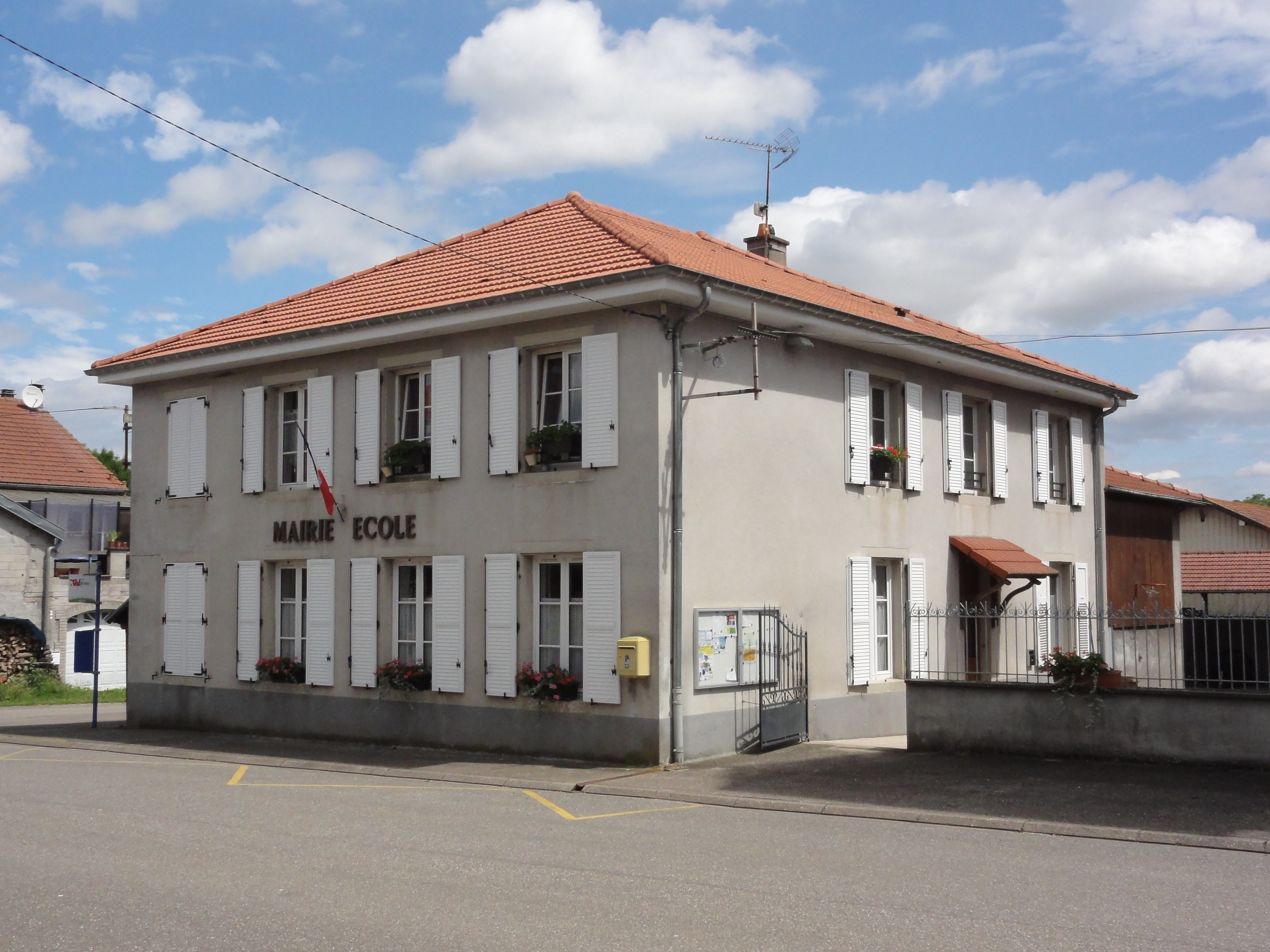
- The town hall in Bezange-la-Grande

- Coat of arms
- Location of Bezange-la-Grande
- Location within France Location within Grand Est
- Coordinates: 48°44′48″N 6°28′29″E
- Country: France
- Region: Grand Est
- Department: Meurthe-et-Moselle
- Arrondissement: Lunéville
- Canton: Baccarat
- Intercommunality: Pays du Sânon

Government
  - Mayor (2020–2026): Laurent Massel
- Area^{1}: 17.24 km^{2} (6.66 sq mi)
- Elevation: 202 m (663 ft)
- Highest elevation: 311 m (1,020 ft)
- Lowest elevation: 203 m (666 ft)
- Population (2023): 169
  - Density: 9.80/km^{2} (25.4/sq mi)
- Time zone: UTC+01:00 (CET)
  - Summer (DST): UTC+02:00 (CEST)
- INSEE/Postal code: 54071 /54370
- ^{1} French Land Register data, which excludes lakes, ponds, glaciers > 1 km^{2} (0.386 sq mi or 247 acres) and river estuaries.

Bezange-la-Grande (French pronunciation: [bəzɑ̃ʒ la ɡʁɑ̃]) is a commune in the Meurthe-et-Moselle department in northeastern France.

== Population ==
Historical population
Year	Pop.	±% p.a.
1968	192	—
1975	203	+0.80%
1982	202	−0.07%
1990	202	+0.00%
1999	182	−1.15%
2007	175	−0.49%
2012	167	−0.93%
2017	158	−1.10%
2023	169	+1.13%
Source: INSEE

== See also ==
- Communes of the Meurthe-et-Moselle department
