= Kalhausen =

- Commune
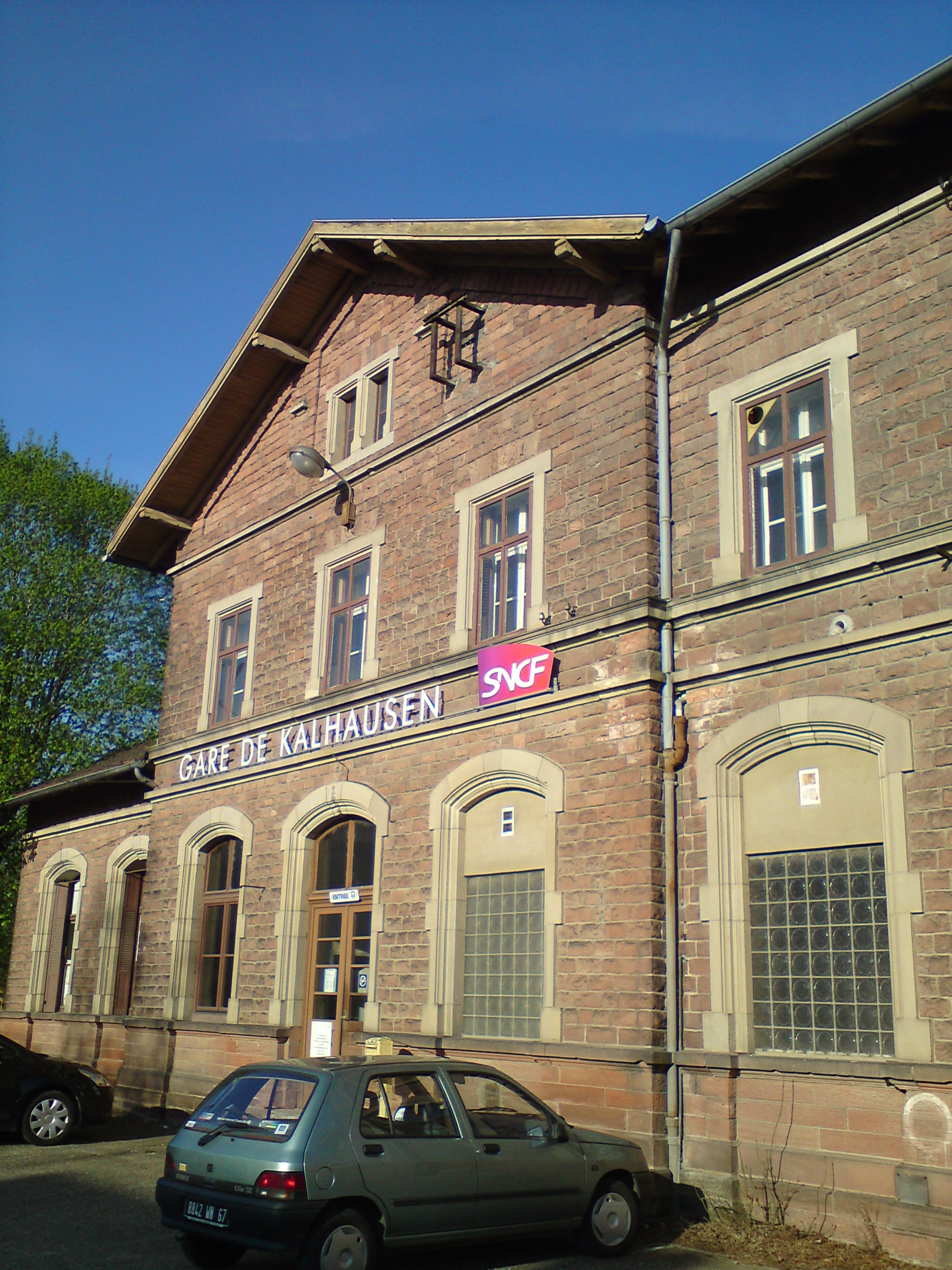
- Kalhausen railway station

- Coat of arms
- Location of Kalhausen
- Location within France Location within Grand Est
- Coordinates: 49°01′18″N 7°09′19″E
- Country: France
- Region: Grand Est
- Department: Moselle
- Arrondissement: Sarreguemines
- Canton: Sarreguemines
- Intercommunality: CA Sarreguemines Confluences

Government
  - Mayor (2020–2026): Michaël Freyermuth
- Area^{1}: 13.52 km^{2} (5.22 sq mi)
- Highest elevation: 331 m (1,086 ft)
- Lowest elevation: 203 m (666 ft)
- Population (2023): 774
  - Density: 57.2/km^{2} (148/sq mi)
- Time zone: UTC+01:00 (CET)
  - Summer (DST): UTC+02:00 (CEST)
- INSEE/Postal code: 57355 /57412
- ^{1} French Land Register data, which excludes lakes, ponds, glaciers > 1 km^{2} (0.386 sq mi or 247 acres) and river estuaries.

Kalhausen (French pronunciation: [kalauzən]; Lorraine Franconian: Kalhuse, German: Kalhausen) is a commune in the Moselle department of the Grand Est administrative region in north-eastern France.

It is the only village belonging to the Pays de Bitche to not be part of the Bitche canton.

== Population ==
Historical population
| Year | Pop. | ±% p.a. |
|---|---|---|
| 1968 | 855 | — |
| 1975 | 844 | −0.18% |
| 1982 | 868 | +0.40% |
| 1990 | 841 | −0.39% |
| 1999 | 799 | −0.57% |
| 2007 | 858 | +0.89% |
| 2012 | 847 | −0.26% |
| 2017 | 837 | −0.24% |
| 2023 | 774 | −1.30% |
Source: INSEE

== See also ==
- Communes of the Moselle department
