= Vair (river) =

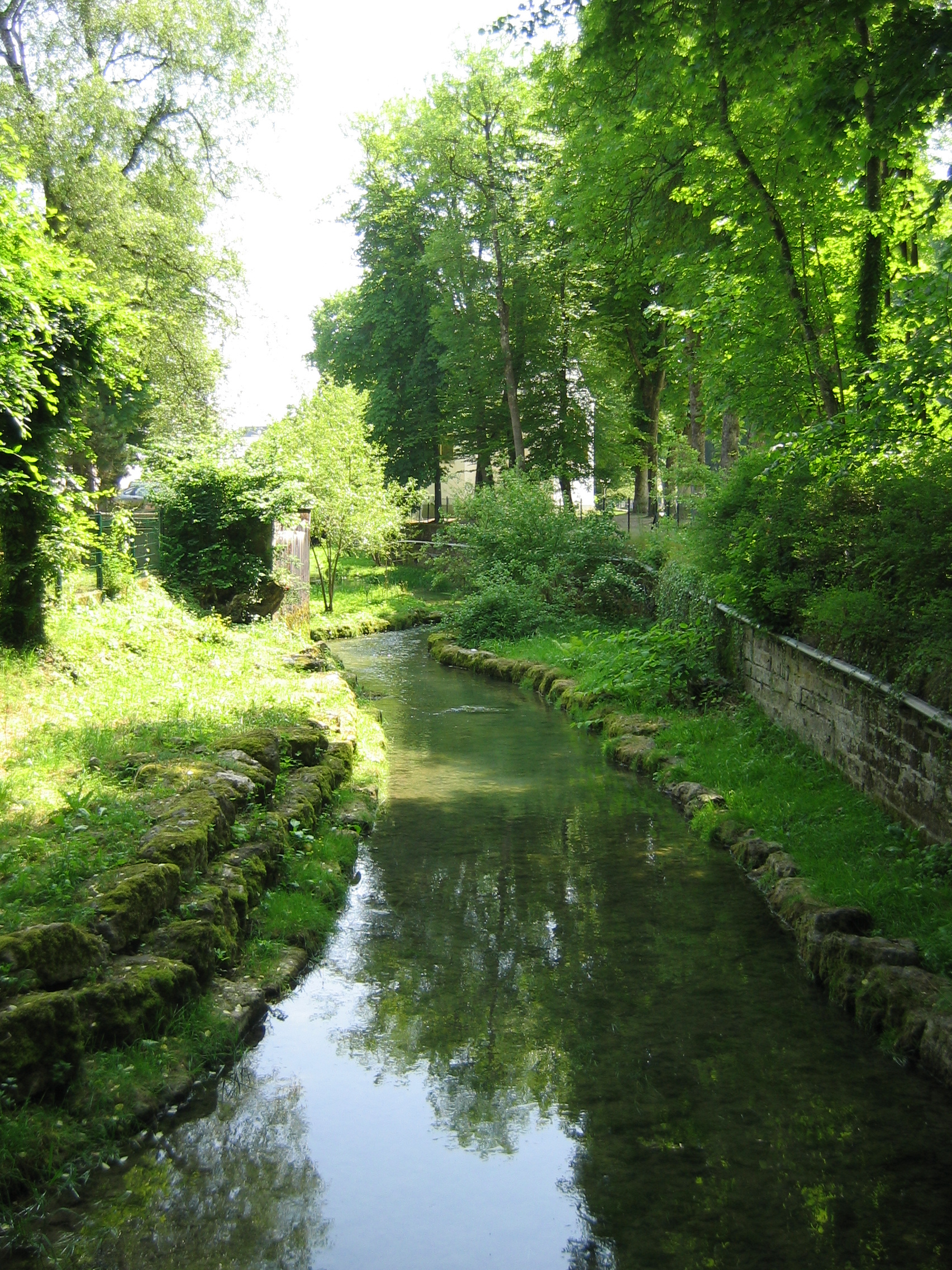

- Location of mouth Vair (river) (Grand Est)

Location
- Country: France

Physical characteristics
- Mouth
  - location: Meuse
  - coordinates: 48.4494°N 5.6935°E
- Length: 65.3 km (40.6 mi)

Basin features
- Progression: Meuse→ North Sea

The Vair (French pronunciation: [vɛʁ]) is a 65.3-kilometre (40.6 mi) river in the Vosges department in Grand Est in northeastern France. It rises in Dombrot-le-Sec and flows generally northwest to join the Meuse at Maxey-sur-Meuse.
