= Bezange-la-Petite =

- Commune
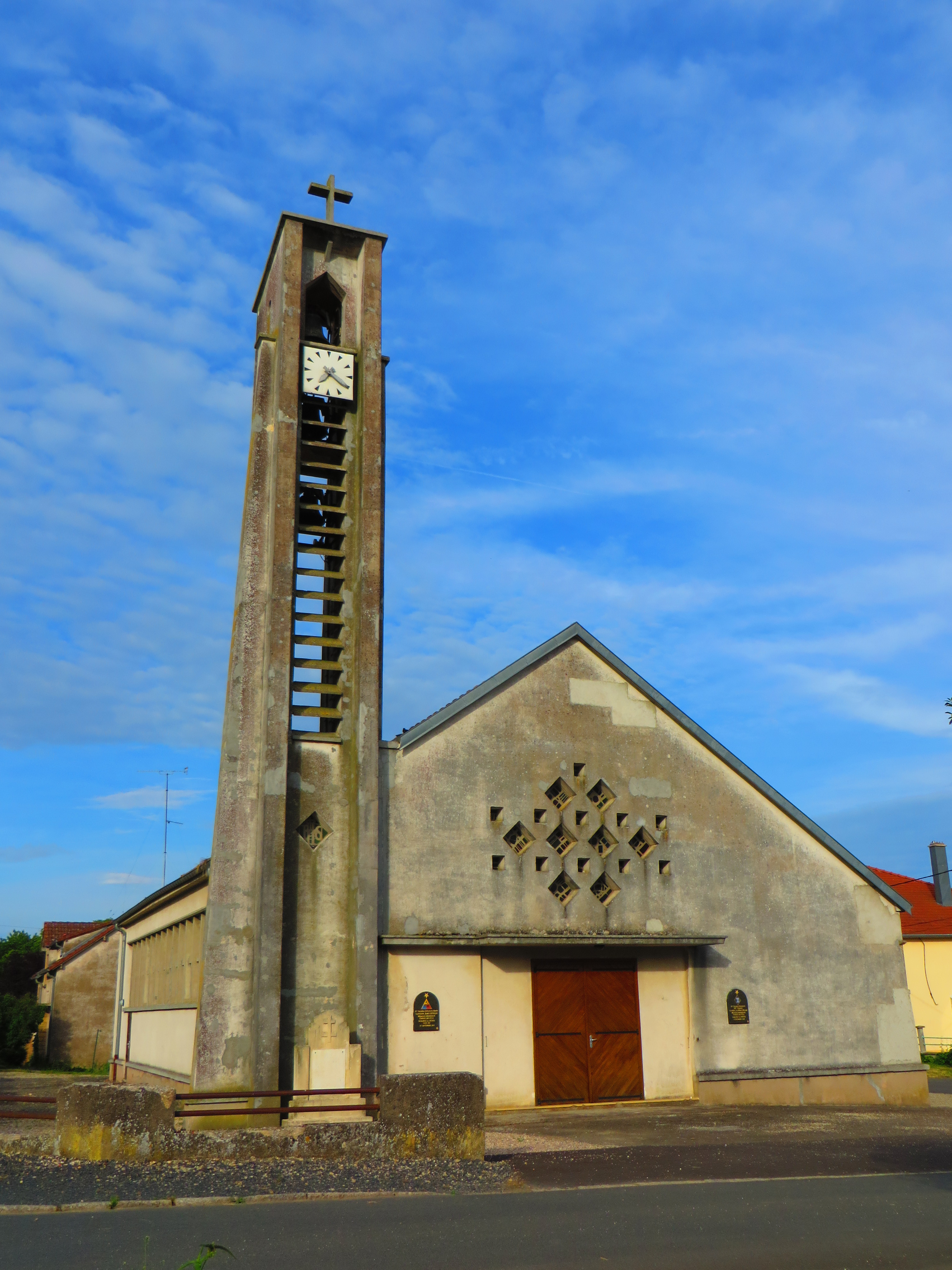
- The church in Bezange-la-Petite

- Coat of arms
- Location of Bezange-la-Petite
- Location within France Location within Grand Est
- Coordinates: 48°43′54″N 6°36′48″E
- Country: France
- Region: Grand Est
- Department: Moselle
- Arrondissement: Sarrebourg-Château-Salins
- Canton: Le Saulnois
- Intercommunality: CC Saulnois

Government
  - Mayor (2020–2026): Hervé Seve
- Area^{1}: 7.93 km^{2} (3.06 sq mi)
- Elevation: 250 m (820 ft)
- Highest elevation: 290 m (950 ft)
- Lowest elevation: 209 m (686 ft)
- Population (2023): 92
  - Density: 12/km^{2} (30/sq mi)
- Time zone: UTC+01:00 (CET)
  - Summer (DST): UTC+02:00 (CEST)
- INSEE/Postal code: 57077 /57630
- ^{1} French Land Register data, which excludes lakes, ponds, glaciers > 1 km^{2} (0.386 sq mi or 247 acres) and river estuaries.

Bezange-la-Petite (French pronunciation: [bəzɑ̃ʒ la pəti]; German: Kleinbessingen) is a commune in the Moselle department in Grand Est in northeastern France.

== Population ==
Historical population
Year	Pop.	±% p.a.
1968	136	—
1975	120	−1.77%
1982	111	−1.11%
1990	87	−3.00%
1999	100	+1.56%
2007	92	−1.04%
2012	94	+0.43%
2017	92	−0.43%
2023	92	+0.00%
Source: INSEE

== See also ==
- Communes of the Moselle department
