= Amelécourt =

- Commune
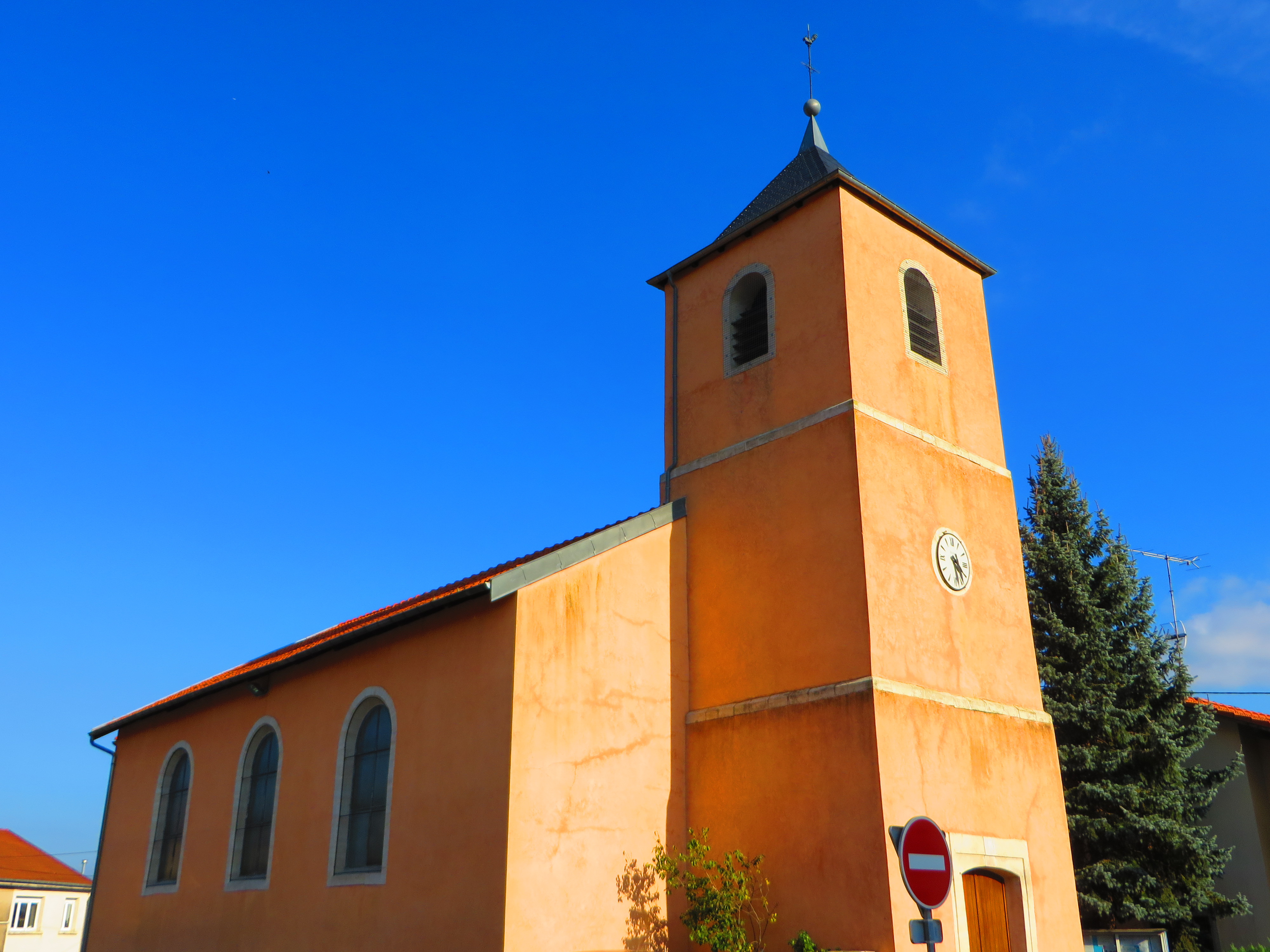
- The church in Amelécourt

- Coat of arms
- Location of Amelécourt
- Location within France Location within Grand Est
- Coordinates: 48°50′24″N 6°30′08″E
- Country: France
- Region: Grand Est
- Department: Moselle
- Arrondissement: Sarrebourg-Château-Salins
- Canton: Le Saulnois
- Intercommunality: Saulnois

Government
  - Mayor (2025–2026): Bénédicte Dermigny
- Area^{1}: 7.56 km^{2} (2.92 sq mi)
- Elevation: 220 m (720 ft)
- Highest elevation: 365 m (1,198 ft)
- Lowest elevation: 202 m (663 ft)
- Population (2023): 118
  - Density: 15.6/km^{2} (40.4/sq mi)
- Time zone: UTC+01:00 (CET)
  - Summer (DST): UTC+02:00 (CEST)
- INSEE/Postal code: 57018 /57170
- ^{1} French Land Register data, which excludes lakes, ponds, glaciers > 1 km^{2} (0.386 sq mi or 247 acres) and river estuaries.

Amelécourt (French pronunciation: [amlekuʁ]; German: Almerichshofen) is a commune in the Moselle department in Grand Est in northeastern France.

It is located on the main D674 road, north of the town of Chateau-Salins.

Neighbouring villages include Lubécourt, Gerbécourt, Vaxy, and Salonnes.

== Population ==
Historical population
Year	Pop.	±% p.a.
1968	114	—
1975	113	−0.13%
1982	119	+0.74%
1990	102	−1.91%
1999	117	+1.54%
2007	141	+2.36%
2012	151	+1.38%
2017	154	+0.39%
2023	118	−4.34%
Source: INSEE

== See also ==
- Communes of the Moselle department
