= Romagne =

Romagne may refer to several places in France:

- Romagne, Gironde, a commune in the Gironde department
- Romagné, a commune in the Ille-et-Vilaine department
- Romagne, Vienne, a commune in the Vienne department
- Romagne-sous-les-Côtes, a commune in the Meuse department
- Romagne-sous-Montfaucon, a commune in the Meuse department
- La Romagne, Ardennes, a commune in the Ardennes department
- La Romagne, Maine-et-Loire, a commune in the Maine-et-Loire department

== See also ==
- Romagna, a historical region of Italy whose French name is Romagne
