= Delut =

- Commune
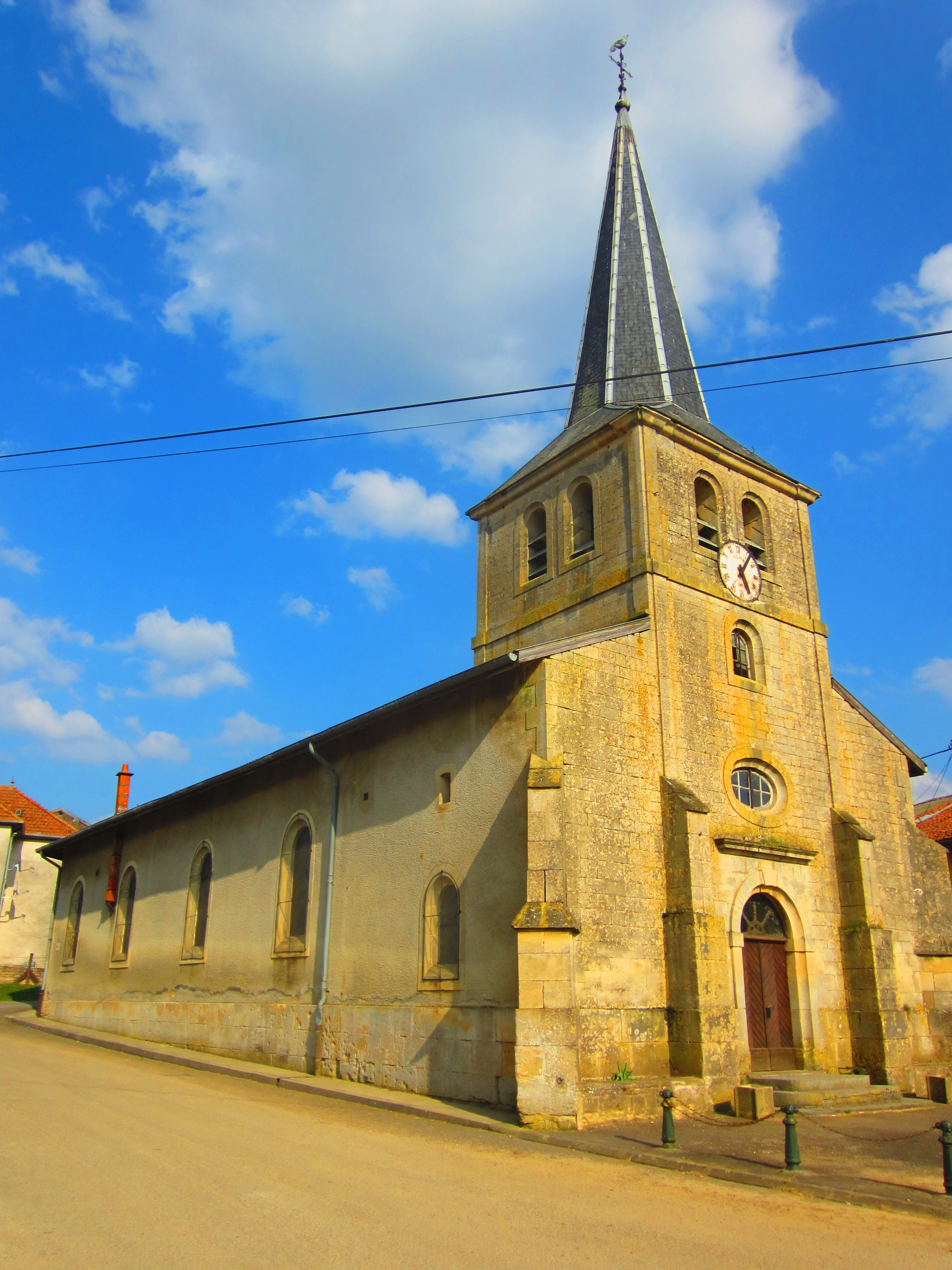
- The church in Delut

- Coat of arms
- Location of Delut
- Location within France Location within Grand Est
- Coordinates: 49°24′33″N 5°25′58″E
- Country: France
- Region: Grand Est
- Department: Meuse
- Arrondissement: Verdun
- Canton: Montmédy
- Intercommunality: CC Damvillers Spincourt

Government
  - Mayor (2020–2026): Christiane Frantz
- Area^{1}: 9.18 km^{2} (3.54 sq mi)
- Elevation: 200 m (660 ft)
- Highest elevation: 277 m (909 ft)
- Lowest elevation: 190 m (620 ft)
- Population (2023): 133
  - Density: 14.5/km^{2} (37.5/sq mi)
- Time zone: UTC+01:00 (CET)
  - Summer (DST): UTC+02:00 (CEST)
- INSEE/Postal code: 55149 /55150
- ^{1} French Land Register data, which excludes lakes, ponds, glaciers > 1 km^{2} (0.386 sq mi or 247 acres) and river estuaries.

Delut (French pronunciation: [dəly]) is a commune in the Meuse department in Grand Est in north-eastern France.

== See also ==
- Communes of the Meuse department
