= Verneuil-Petit =

- Commune
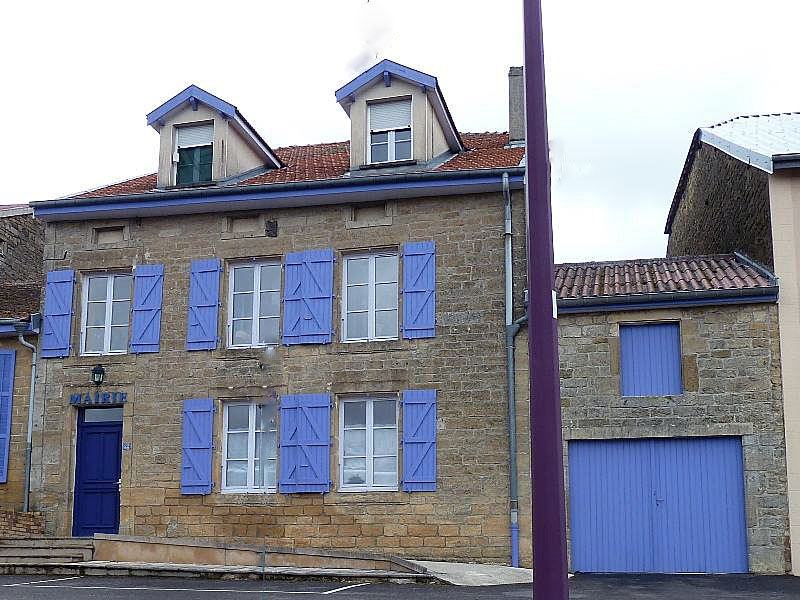
- Town hall
- Location of Verneuil-Petit
- Location within France Location within Grand Est
- Coordinates: 49°32′38″N 5°24′54″E
- Country: France
- Region: Grand Est
- Department: Meuse
- Arrondissement: Verdun
- Canton: Montmédy
- Intercommunality: CC du pays de Montmédy

Government
  - Mayor (2020–2026): Pierre Lemaire
- Area^{1}: 3.99 km^{2} (1.54 sq mi)
- Highest elevation: 350 m (1,150 ft)
- Lowest elevation: 200 m (660 ft)
- Population (2023): 113
  - Density: 28.3/km^{2} (73.4/sq mi)
- Time zone: UTC+01:00 (CET)
  - Summer (DST): UTC+02:00 (CEST)
- INSEE/Postal code: 55547 /55600
- ^{1} French Land Register data, which excludes lakes, ponds, glaciers > 1 km^{2} (0.386 sq mi or 247 acres) and river estuaries.

Verneuil-Petit (French pronunciation: [vɛʁnœj pəti]) is a commune in the Meuse department in Grand Est in north-eastern France.

== See also ==
- Communes of the Meuse department
