= Thonne-les-Près =

- Commune
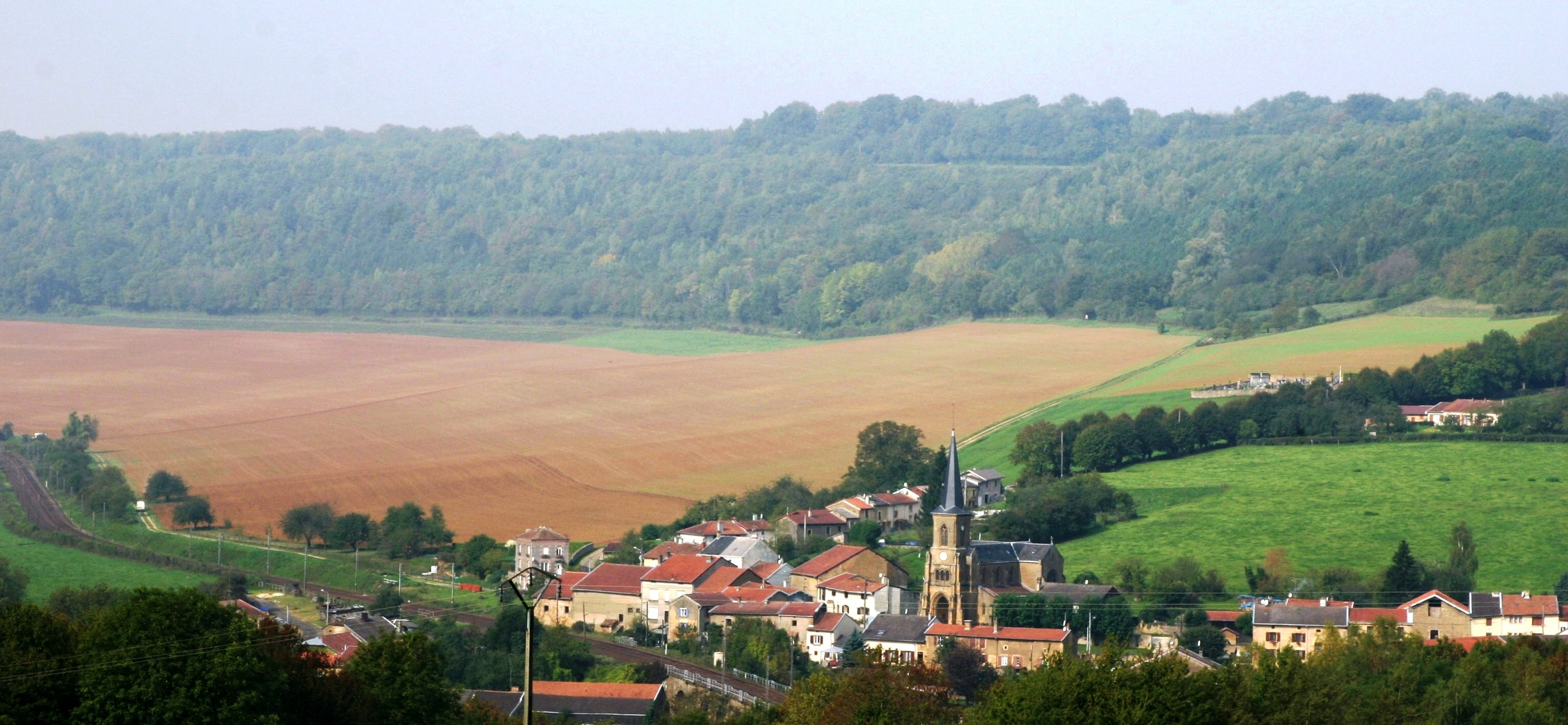
- A general view of Thonne-les-Près
- Location of Thonne-les-Près
- Location within France Location within Grand Est
- Coordinates: 49°31′38″N 5°21′04″E
- Country: France
- Region: Grand Est
- Department: Meuse
- Arrondissement: Verdun
- Canton: Montmédy
- Intercommunality: Pays de Montmédy

Government
  - Mayor (2020–2026): Christian Meurice
- Area^{1}: 5.42 km^{2} (2.09 sq mi)
- Elevation: 197 m (646 ft)
- Highest elevation: 334 m (1,096 ft)
- Lowest elevation: 176 m (577 ft)
- Population (2023): 125
  - Density: 23.1/km^{2} (59.7/sq mi)
- Time zone: UTC+01:00 (CET)
  - Summer (DST): UTC+02:00 (CEST)
- INSEE/Postal code: 55510 /55600
- ^{1} French Land Register data, which excludes lakes, ponds, glaciers > 1 km^{2} (0.386 sq mi or 247 acres) and river estuaries.

Thonne-les-Près (French pronunciation: [tɔn le pʁɛ]) is a commune in the Meuse department in Grand Est in north-eastern France.

== See also ==
- Communes of the Meuse department
