= Lissey =

- Commune
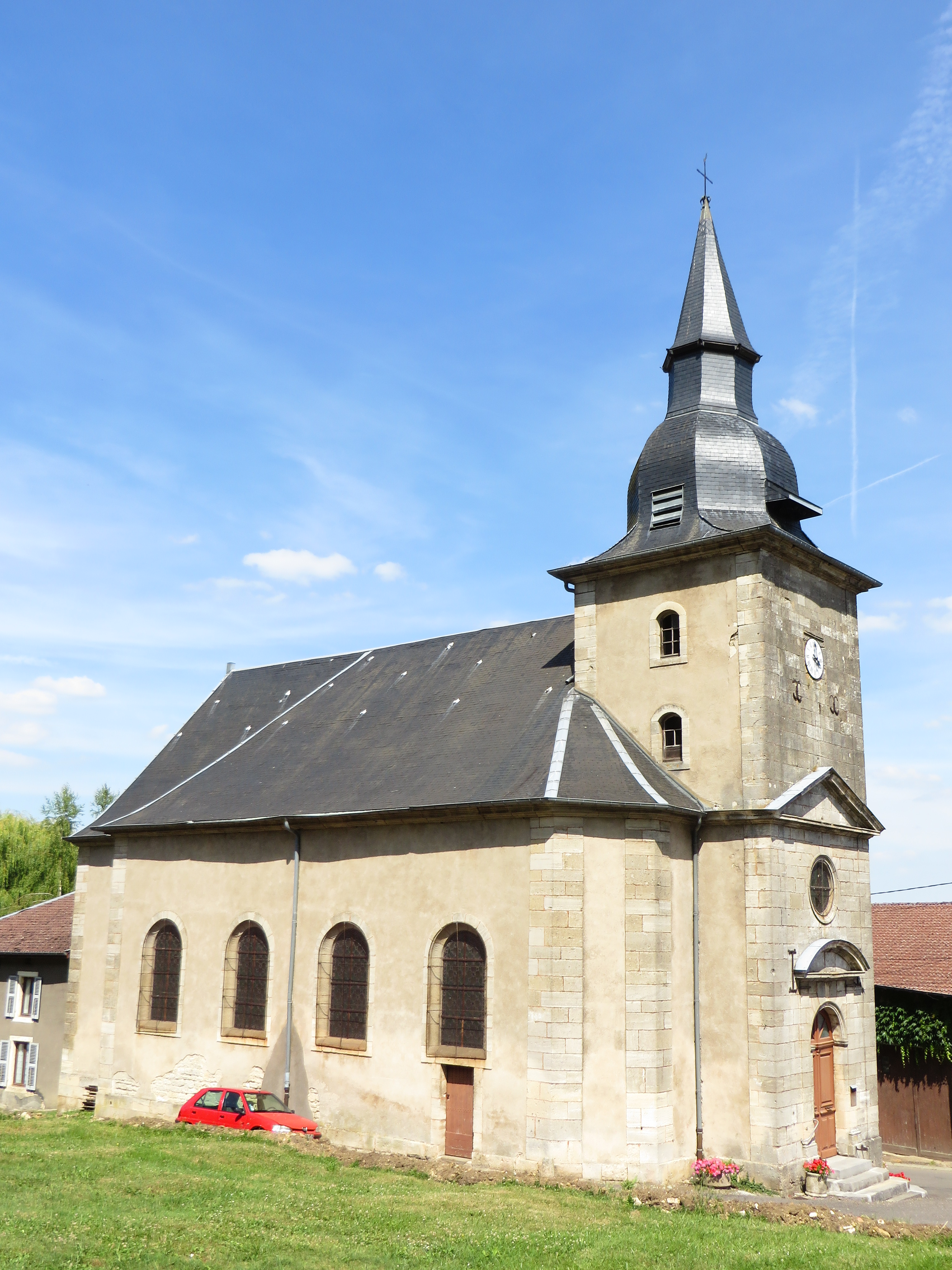
- The church in Lissey

- Coat of arms
- Location of Lissey
- Location within France Location within Grand Est
- Coordinates: 49°22′24″N 5°20′51″E
- Country: France
- Region: Grand Est
- Department: Meuse
- Arrondissement: Verdun
- Canton: Montmédy
- Intercommunality: CC Damvillers Spincourt

Government
  - Mayor (2020–2026): Bertrand Le Francois
- Area^{1}: 9.97 km^{2} (3.85 sq mi)
- Elevation: 240 m (790 ft)
- Highest elevation: 386 m (1,266 ft)
- Lowest elevation: 191 m (627 ft)
- Population (2023): 101
  - Density: 10.1/km^{2} (26.2/sq mi)
- Time zone: UTC+01:00 (CET)
  - Summer (DST): UTC+02:00 (CEST)
- INSEE/Postal code: 55297 /55150
- ^{1} French Land Register data, which excludes lakes, ponds, glaciers > 1 km^{2} (0.386 sq mi or 247 acres) and river estuaries.

Lissey (French pronunciation: [lisɛ]) is a commune in the Meuse department in Grand Est in north-eastern France.

== See also ==
- Communes of the Meuse department
