= Quincy-Landzécourt =

- Commune
- Coat of arms
- Location of Quincy-Landzécourt
- Location within France Location within Grand Est
- Coordinates: 49°29′41″N 5°17′50″E
- Country: France
- Region: Grand Est
- Department: Meuse
- Arrondissement: Verdun
- Canton: Montmédy
- Intercommunality: CC du pays de Montmédy

Government
  - Mayor (2020–2026): Antoine Collot
- Area^{1}: 12.48 km^{2} (4.82 sq mi)
- Elevation: 220 m (720 ft)
- Highest elevation: 290 m (950 ft)
- Lowest elevation: 175 m (574 ft)
- Population (2023): 146
  - Density: 11.7/km^{2} (30.3/sq mi)
- Time zone: UTC+01:00 (CET)
  - Summer (DST): UTC+02:00 (CEST)
- INSEE/Postal code: 55410 /55600
- ^{1} French Land Register data, which excludes lakes, ponds, glaciers > 1 km^{2} (0.386 sq mi or 247 acres) and river estuaries.

Quincy-Landzécourt (French pronunciation: [kɛ̃si lɑ̃dzekuʁ]) is a commune in the Meuse department in Grand Est in north-eastern France.

== See also ==
- Communes of the Meuse department
