= Vittarville =

- Commune
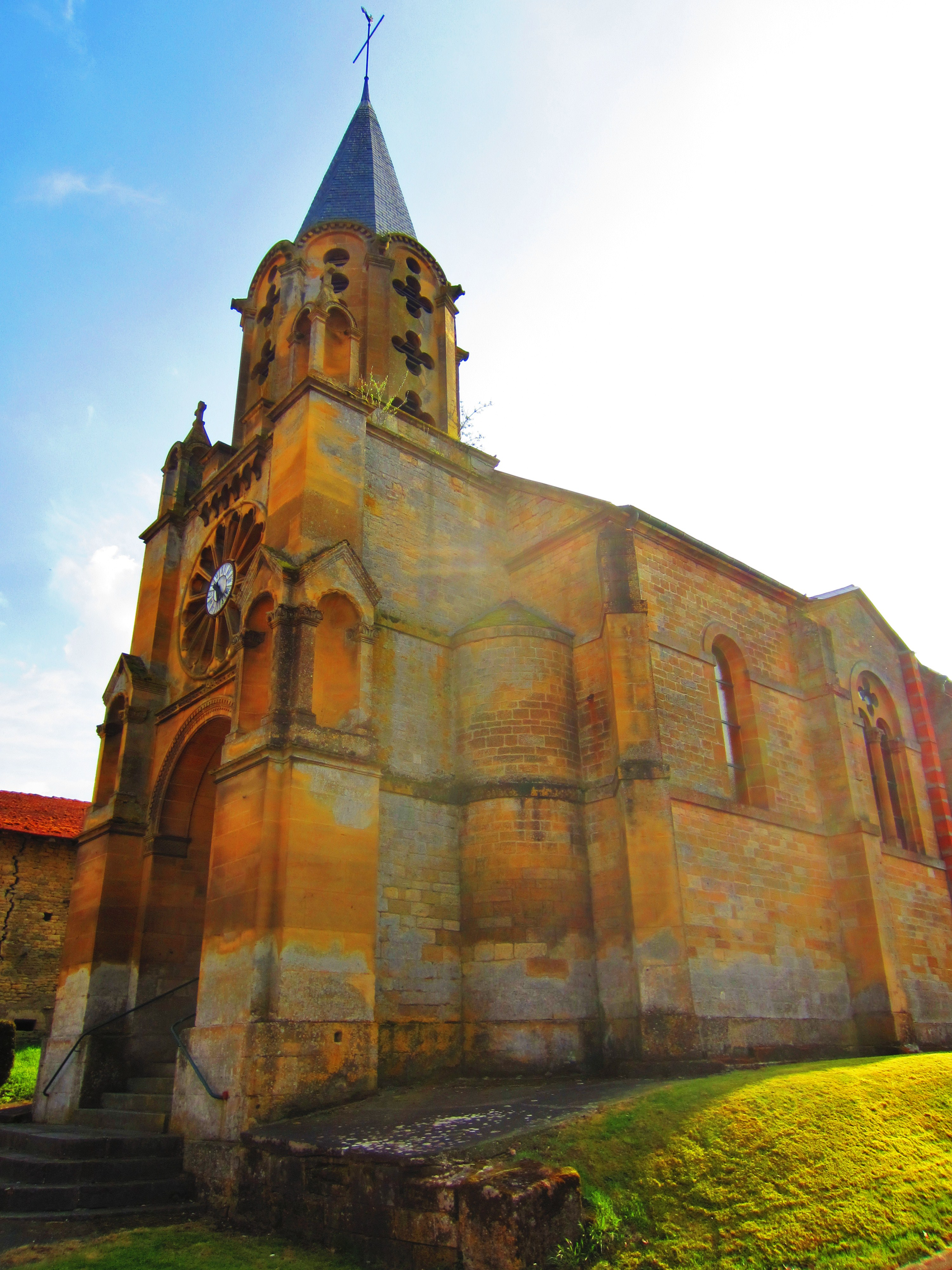
- The church in Vittarville
- Location of Vittarville
- Location within France Location within Grand Est
- Coordinates: 49°23′42″N 5°24′47″E
- Country: France
- Region: Grand Est
- Department: Meuse
- Arrondissement: Verdun
- Canton: Montmédy
- Intercommunality: Damvillers Spincourt

Government
  - Mayor (2021–2026): Philippe Richard
- Area^{1}: 8.15 km^{2} (3.15 sq mi)
- Elevation: 196 m (643 ft)
- Highest elevation: 236 m (774 ft)
- Lowest elevation: 190 m (620 ft)
- Population (2023): 92
  - Density: 11/km^{2} (29/sq mi)
- Time zone: UTC+01:00 (CET)
  - Summer (DST): UTC+02:00 (CEST)
- INSEE/Postal code: 55572 /55150
- ^{1} French Land Register data, which excludes lakes, ponds, glaciers > 1 km^{2} (0.386 sq mi or 247 acres) and river estuaries.

Vittarville (French pronunciation: [vitaʁvil]) is a commune in the Meuse department in Grand Est in north-eastern France.

== See also ==
- Communes of the Meuse department
