= Chauvency-Saint-Hubert =

- Commune
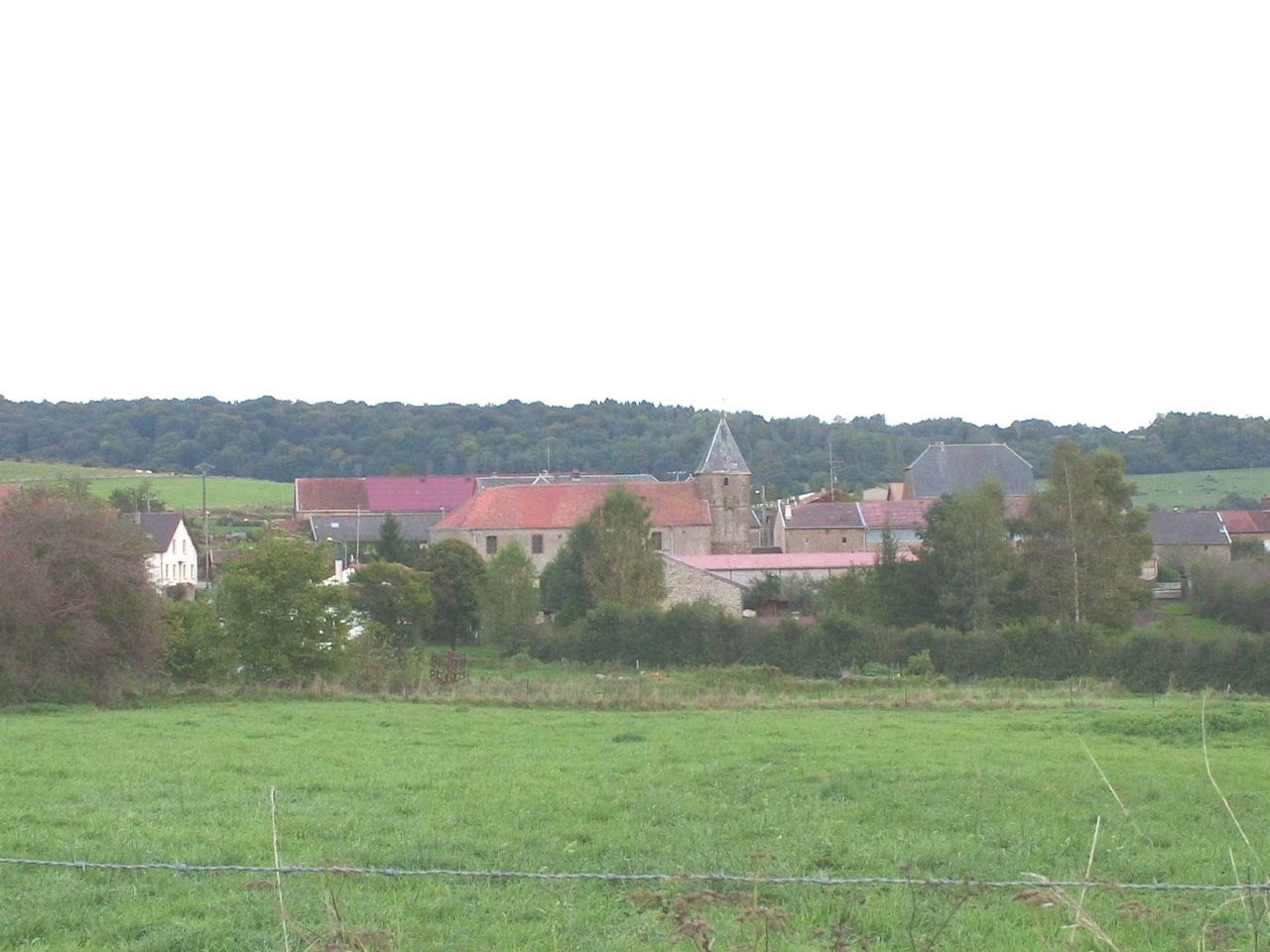
- A general view of the village of Chauvency-St-Hubert

- Coat of arms
- Location of Chauvency-Saint-Hubert
- Location within France Location within Grand Est
- Coordinates: 49°32′04″N 5°17′48″E
- Country: France
- Region: Grand Est
- Department: Meuse
- Arrondissement: Verdun
- Canton: Montmédy
- Intercommunality: CC du pays de Montmédy

Government
  - Mayor (2020–2026): David Alexandre
- Area^{1}: 10.76 km^{2} (4.15 sq mi)
- Elevation: 190 m (620 ft)
- Highest elevation: 342 m (1,122 ft)
- Lowest elevation: 172 m (564 ft)
- Population (2023): 209
  - Density: 19.4/km^{2} (50.3/sq mi)
- Time zone: UTC+01:00 (CET)
  - Summer (DST): UTC+02:00 (CEST)
- INSEE/Postal code: 55110 /55600
- ^{1} French Land Register data, which excludes lakes, ponds, glaciers > 1 km^{2} (0.386 sq mi or 247 acres) and river estuaries.

Chauvency-Saint-Hubert (French pronunciation: [ʃovɑ̃si sɛ̃.t‿ybɛʁ]) is a commune in the Meuse department in Grand Est in north-eastern France.

== See also ==
- Communes of the Meuse department
