= Brandeville =

- Commune
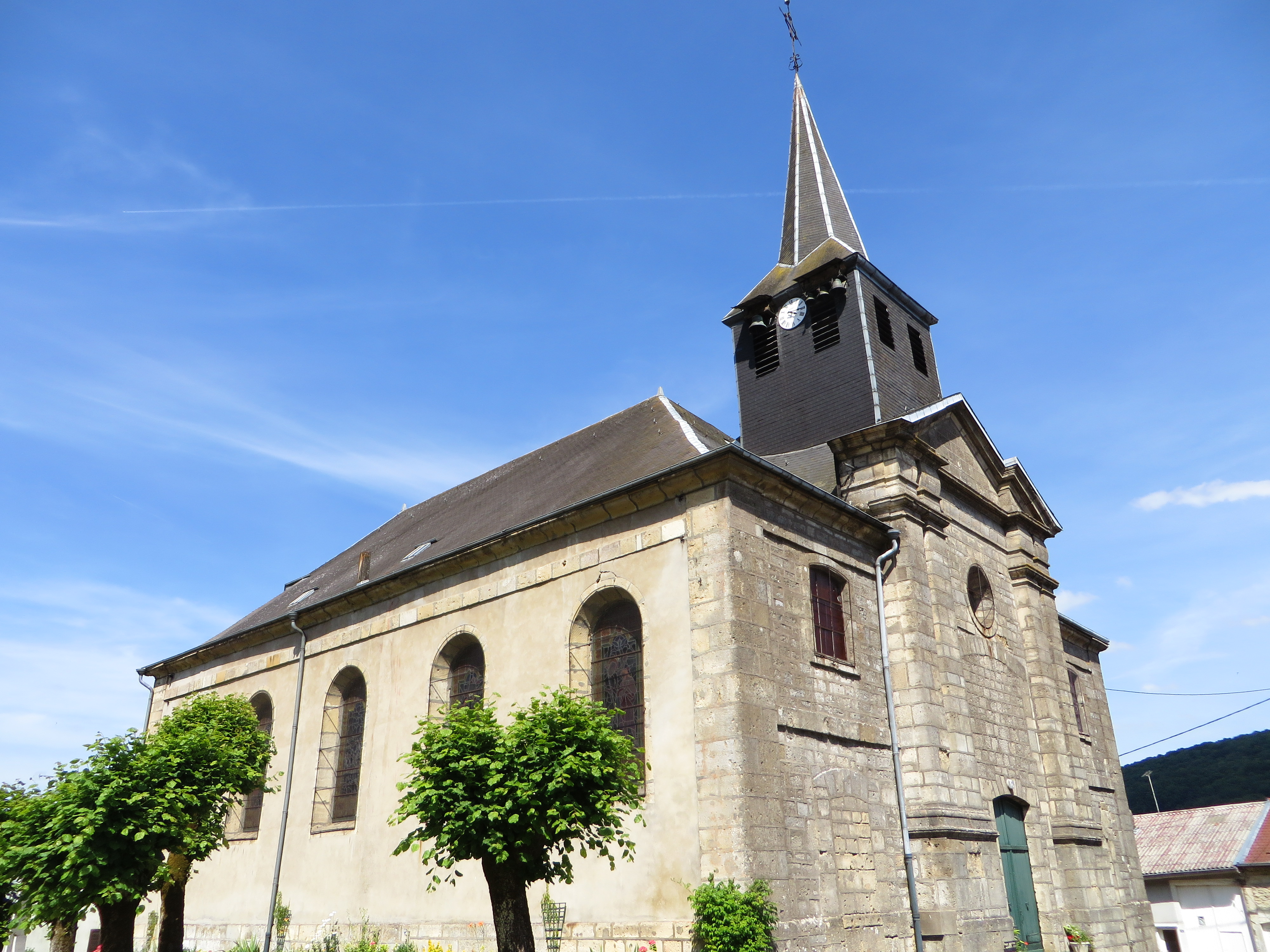
- The church in Brandeville

- Coat of arms
- Location of Brandeville
- Location within France Location within Grand Est
- Coordinates: 49°23′34″N 5°18′17″E
- Country: France
- Region: Grand Est
- Department: Meuse
- Arrondissement: Verdun
- Canton: Montmédy

Government
  - Mayor (2020–2026): Luc Bourtembourg
- Area^{1}: 12.14 km^{2} (4.69 sq mi)
- Elevation: 235 m (771 ft)
- Highest elevation: 377 m (1,237 ft)
- Lowest elevation: 193 m (633 ft)
- Population (2023): 165
  - Density: 13.6/km^{2} (35.2/sq mi)
- Time zone: UTC+01:00 (CET)
  - Summer (DST): UTC+02:00 (CEST)
- INSEE/Postal code: 55071 /55150
- ^{1} French Land Register data, which excludes lakes, ponds, glaciers > 1 km^{2} (0.386 sq mi or 247 acres) and river estuaries.

Brandeville (French pronunciation: [bʁɑ̃dvil]) is a commune in the Meuse department in Grand Est in northeastern France.

== Population ==
Historical population
Year	Pop.	±% p.a.
1968	245	—
1975	204	−2.58%
1982	175	−2.17%
1990	136	−3.10%
1999	141	+0.40%
2007	165	+1.98%
2012	178	+1.53%
2017	184	+0.67%
2023	165	−1.80%
Source: INSEE

== See also ==
- Communes of the Meuse department
