= Breux, Meuse =

Breux
- Commune
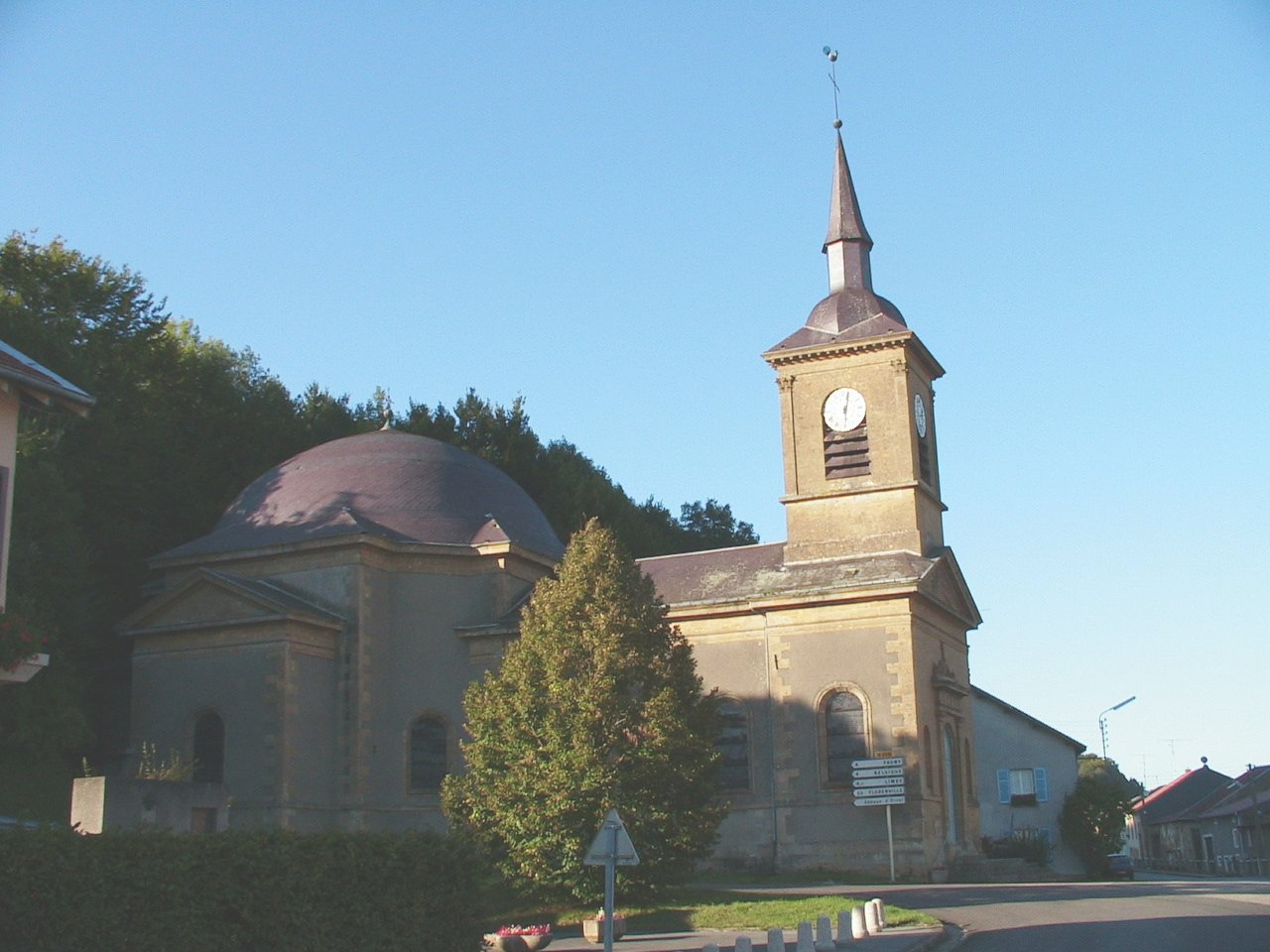
- The church in Breux
- Location of Breux
- Location within France Location within Grand Est
- Coordinates: 49°35′03″N 5°23′30″E
- Country: France
- Region: Grand Est
- Department: Meuse
- Arrondissement: Verdun
- Canton: Montmédy
- Intercommunality: Pays de Montmédy

Government
  - Mayor (2020–2026): Guy Charlier
- Area^{1}: 12.99 km^{2} (5.02 sq mi)
- Elevation: 426 m (1,398 ft)
- Highest elevation: 321 m (1,053 ft)
- Lowest elevation: 203 m (666 ft)
- Population (2023): 258
  - Density: 19.9/km^{2} (51.4/sq mi)
- Time zone: UTC+01:00 (CET)
  - Summer (DST): UTC+02:00 (CEST)
- INSEE/Postal code: 55077 /55600
- ^{1} French Land Register data, which excludes lakes, ponds, glaciers > 1 km^{2} (0.386 sq mi or 247 acres) and river estuaries.

Breux (French pronunciation: [bʁø]) is a commune in the Meuse department in Grand Est in northeastern France.

== Population ==
Historical population
Year	Pop.	±% p.a.
1968	250	—
1975	193	−3.63%
1982	163	−2.38%
1990	160	−0.23%
1999	178	+1.19%
2007	248	+4.23%
2012	258	+0.79%
2017	258	+0.00%
2023	258	+0.00%
Source: INSEE

== See also ==
- Communes of the Meuse department
