= Écouviez =

- Commune
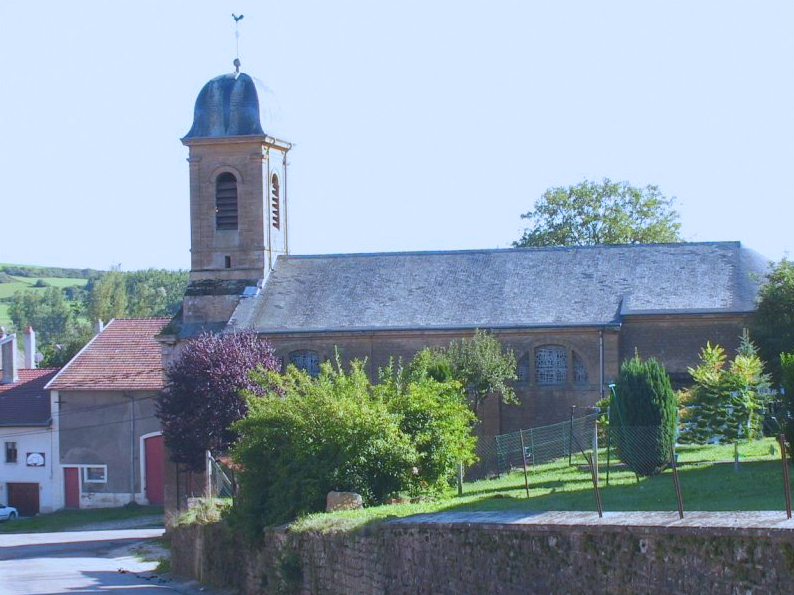
- The church seen from Couvreux Road

- Coat of arms
- Location of Écouviez
- Location within France Location within Grand Est
- Coordinates: 49°31′40″N 5°27′37″E
- Country: France
- Region: Grand Est
- Department: Meuse
- Arrondissement: Verdun
- Canton: Montmédy
- Intercommunality: CC du pays de Montmédy

Government
  - Mayor (2020–2026): Cédric Guillaumé
- Area^{1}: 4.3 km^{2} (1.7 sq mi)
- Elevation: 191 m (627 ft)
- Highest elevation: 340 m (1,120 ft)
- Lowest elevation: 187 m (614 ft)
- Population (2023): 543
  - Density: 130/km^{2} (330/sq mi)
- Demonym: les Écouvissois
- Time zone: UTC+01:00 (CET)
  - Summer (DST): UTC+02:00 (CEST)
- INSEE/Postal code: 55169 /55600
- ^{1} French Land Register data, which excludes lakes, ponds, glaciers > 1 km^{2} (0.386 sq mi or 247 acres) and river estuaries.

Écouviez (French pronunciation: [ekuvje]) is a commune in the Meuse department in Grand Est in north-eastern France.

== See also ==
- Communes of the Meuse department
