= Juvigny-sur-Loison =

- Commune
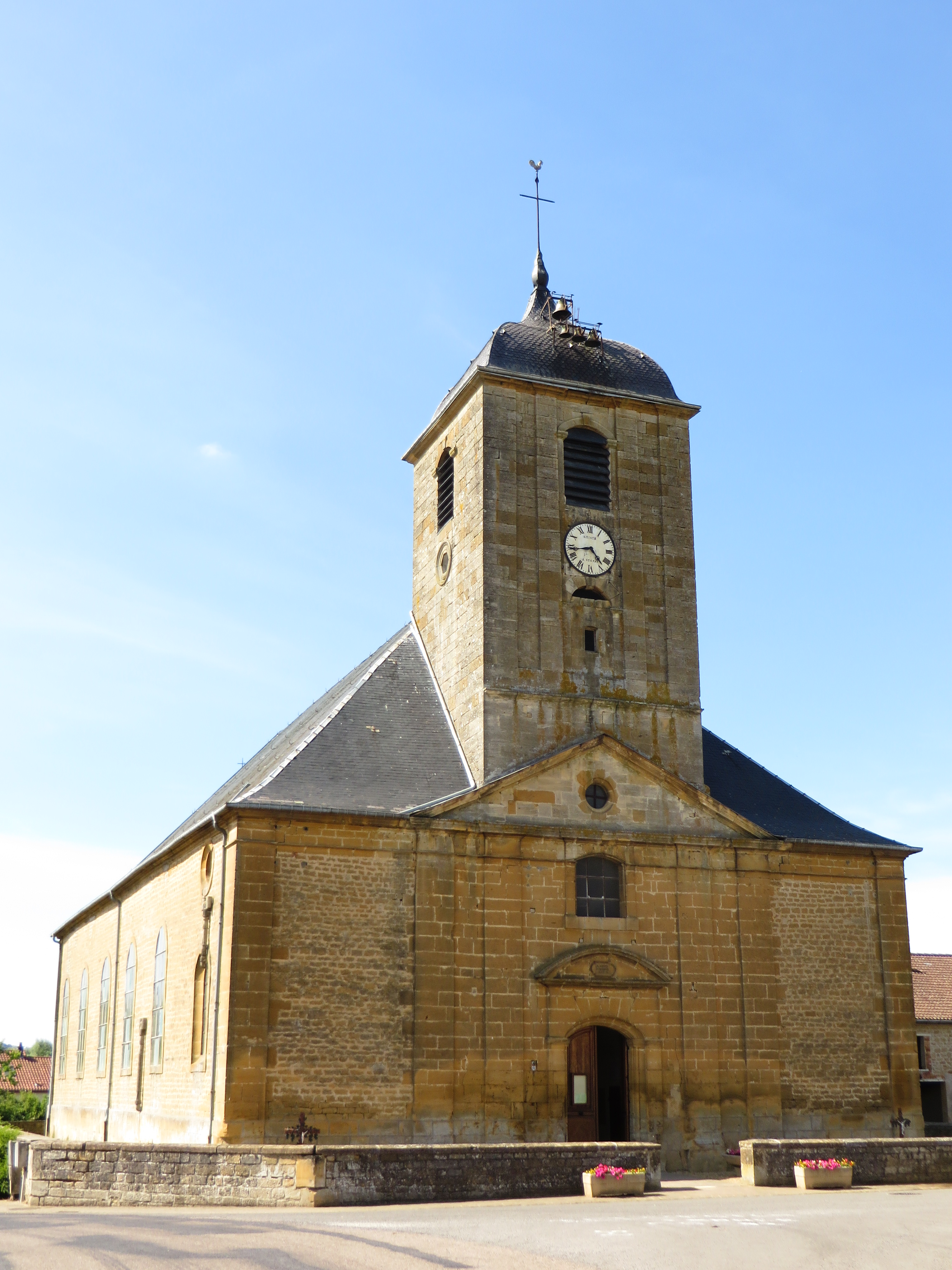
- The church in Juvigny-sur-Loison

- Coat of arms
- Location of Juvigny-sur-Loison
- Location within France Location within Grand Est
- Coordinates: 49°28′02″N 5°20′30″E
- Country: France
- Region: Grand Est
- Department: Meuse
- Arrondissement: Verdun
- Canton: Montmédy
- Intercommunality: CC du pays de Montmédy

Government
  - Mayor (2020–2026): Francis Colin
- Area^{1}: 16.42 km^{2} (6.34 sq mi)
- Elevation: 145 m (476 ft)
- Highest elevation: 301 m (988 ft)
- Lowest elevation: 178 m (584 ft)
- Population (2023): 239
  - Density: 14.6/km^{2} (37.7/sq mi)
- Time zone: UTC+01:00 (CET)
  - Summer (DST): UTC+02:00 (CEST)
- INSEE/Postal code: 55262 /55600
- ^{1} French Land Register data, which excludes lakes, ponds, glaciers > 1 km^{2} (0.386 sq mi or 247 acres) and river estuaries.

Juvigny-sur-Loison (French pronunciation: [ʒyviɲi syʁ lwazɔ̃]) is a commune in the Meuse department in Grand Est in north-eastern France.

== See also ==
- Communes of the Meuse department
