= Verneuil-Grand =

- Commune
- Location of Verneuil-Grand
- Location within France Location within Grand Est
- Coordinates: 49°31′40″N 5°25′05″E
- Country: France
- Region: Grand Est
- Department: Meuse
- Arrondissement: Verdun
- Canton: Montmédy
- Intercommunality: CC du pays de Montmédy

Government
  - Mayor (2023–2026): Marie-Pierre Noisette
- Area^{1}: 6.21 km^{2} (2.40 sq mi)
- Highest elevation: 348 m (1,142 ft)
- Lowest elevation: 184 m (604 ft)
- Population (2023): 198
  - Density: 31.9/km^{2} (82.6/sq mi)
- Time zone: UTC+01:00 (CET)
  - Summer (DST): UTC+02:00 (CEST)
- INSEE/Postal code: 55546 /55600
- ^{1} French Land Register data, which excludes lakes, ponds, glaciers > 1 km^{2} (0.386 sq mi or 247 acres) and river estuaries.

Verneuil-Grand (French pronunciation: [vɛʁnœj gʁɑ̃]) is a commune in the Meuse department in Grand Est in north-eastern France.

== See also ==
- Communes of the Meuse department
