= Dombras =

- Commune
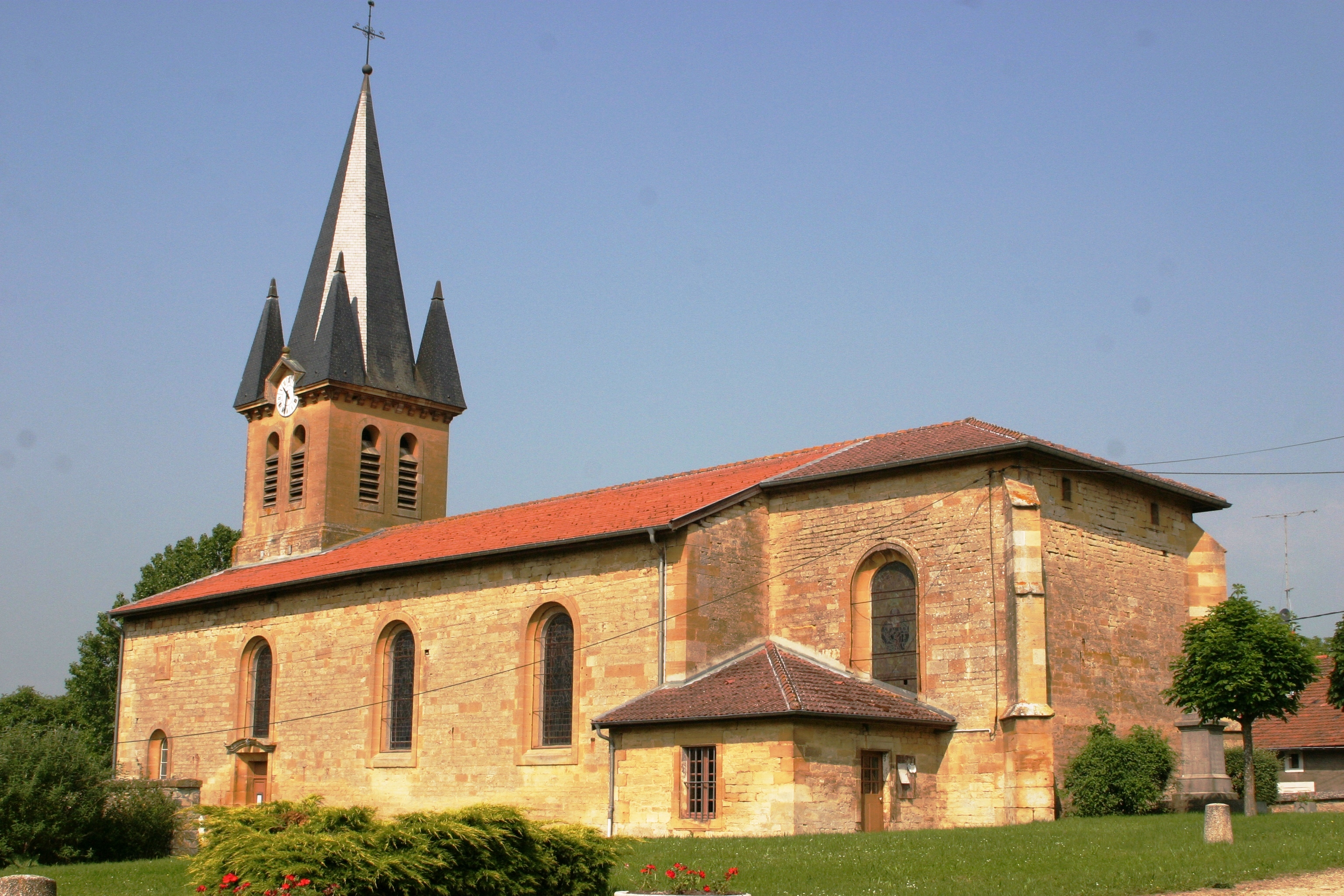
- The church in Dombras
- Location of Dombras
- Location within France Location within Grand Est
- Coordinates: 49°23′31″N 5°27′35″E
- Country: France
- Region: Grand Est
- Department: Meuse
- Arrondissement: Verdun
- Canton: Montmédy
- Intercommunality: CC Damvillers Spincourt

Government
  - Mayor (2020–2026): Eveline Biver
- Area^{1}: 11.27 km^{2} (4.35 sq mi)
- Elevation: 207 m (679 ft)
- Highest elevation: 249 m (817 ft)
- Lowest elevation: 192 m (630 ft)
- Population (2023): 140
  - Density: 12/km^{2} (32/sq mi)
- Time zone: UTC+01:00 (CET)
  - Summer (DST): UTC+02:00 (CEST)
- INSEE/Postal code: 55156 /55150
- ^{1} French Land Register data, which excludes lakes, ponds, glaciers > 1 km^{2} (0.386 sq mi or 247 acres) and river estuaries.

Dombras (French pronunciation: [dɔ̃bʁa]) is a commune in the Meuse department in Grand Est in north-eastern France.
