= Vigneul-sous-Montmédy =

- Commune
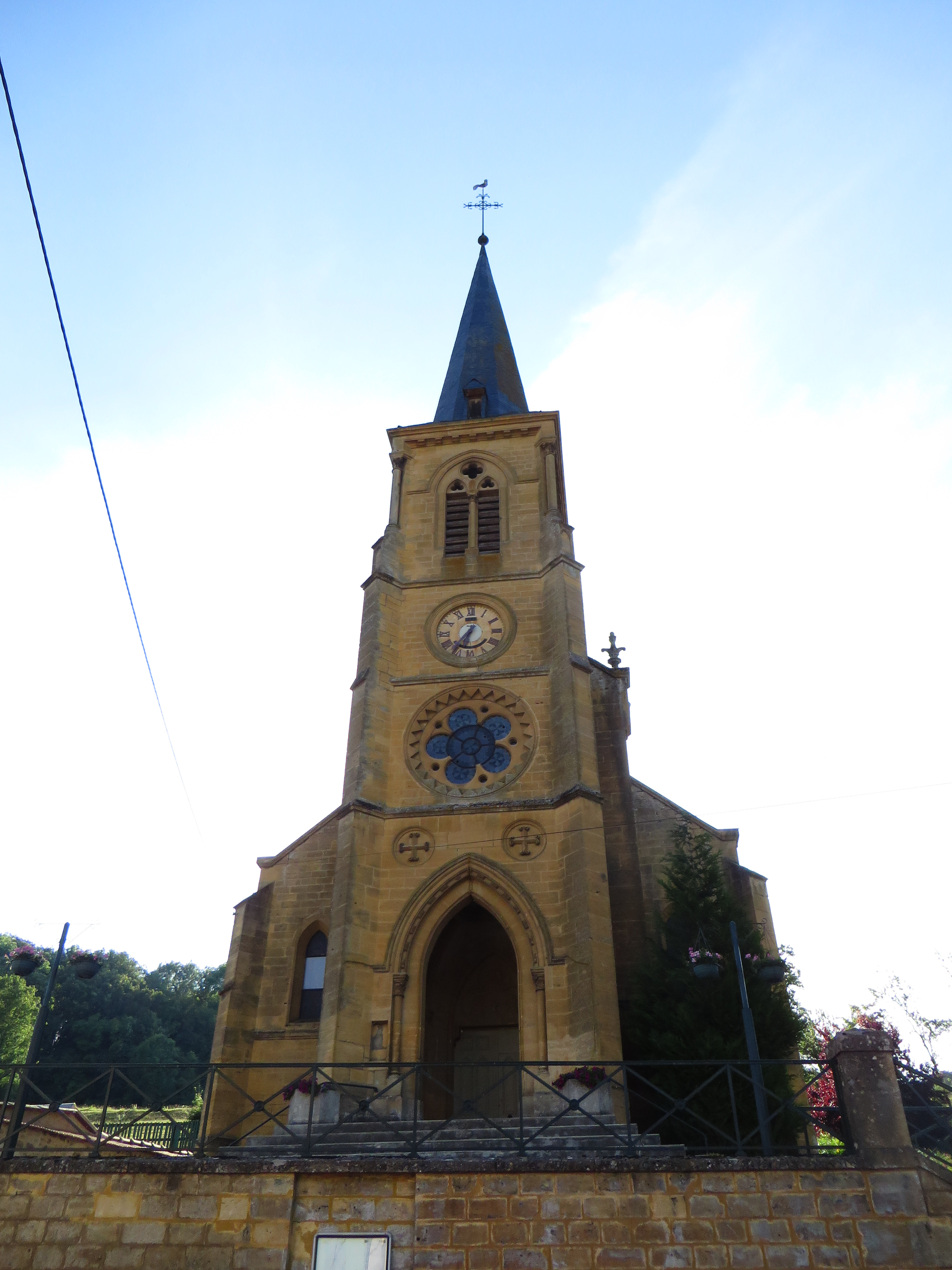
- The church in Vigneul-sous-Montmédy
- Location of Vigneul-sous-Montmédy
- Location within France Location within Grand Est
- Coordinates: 49°30′33″N 5°19′56″E
- Country: France
- Region: Grand Est
- Department: Meuse
- Arrondissement: Verdun
- Canton: Montmédy
- Intercommunality: CC du pays de Montmédy

Government
  - Mayor (2020–2026): Claude Richard
- Area^{1}: 4.63 km^{2} (1.79 sq mi)
- Elevation: 192 m (630 ft)
- Highest elevation: 290 m (950 ft)
- Lowest elevation: 176 m (577 ft)
- Population (2023): 86
  - Density: 19/km^{2} (48/sq mi)
- Time zone: UTC+01:00 (CET)
  - Summer (DST): UTC+02:00 (CEST)
- INSEE/Postal code: 55552 /55600
- ^{1} French Land Register data, which excludes lakes, ponds, glaciers > 1 km^{2} (0.386 sq mi or 247 acres) and river estuaries.

Vigneul-sous-Montmédy (French pronunciation: [viɲœl su mɔ̃medi]) is a commune in the Meuse department in Grand Est in north-eastern France.

== See also ==
- Communes of the Meuse department
