= Ville-devant-Chaumont =

- Commune
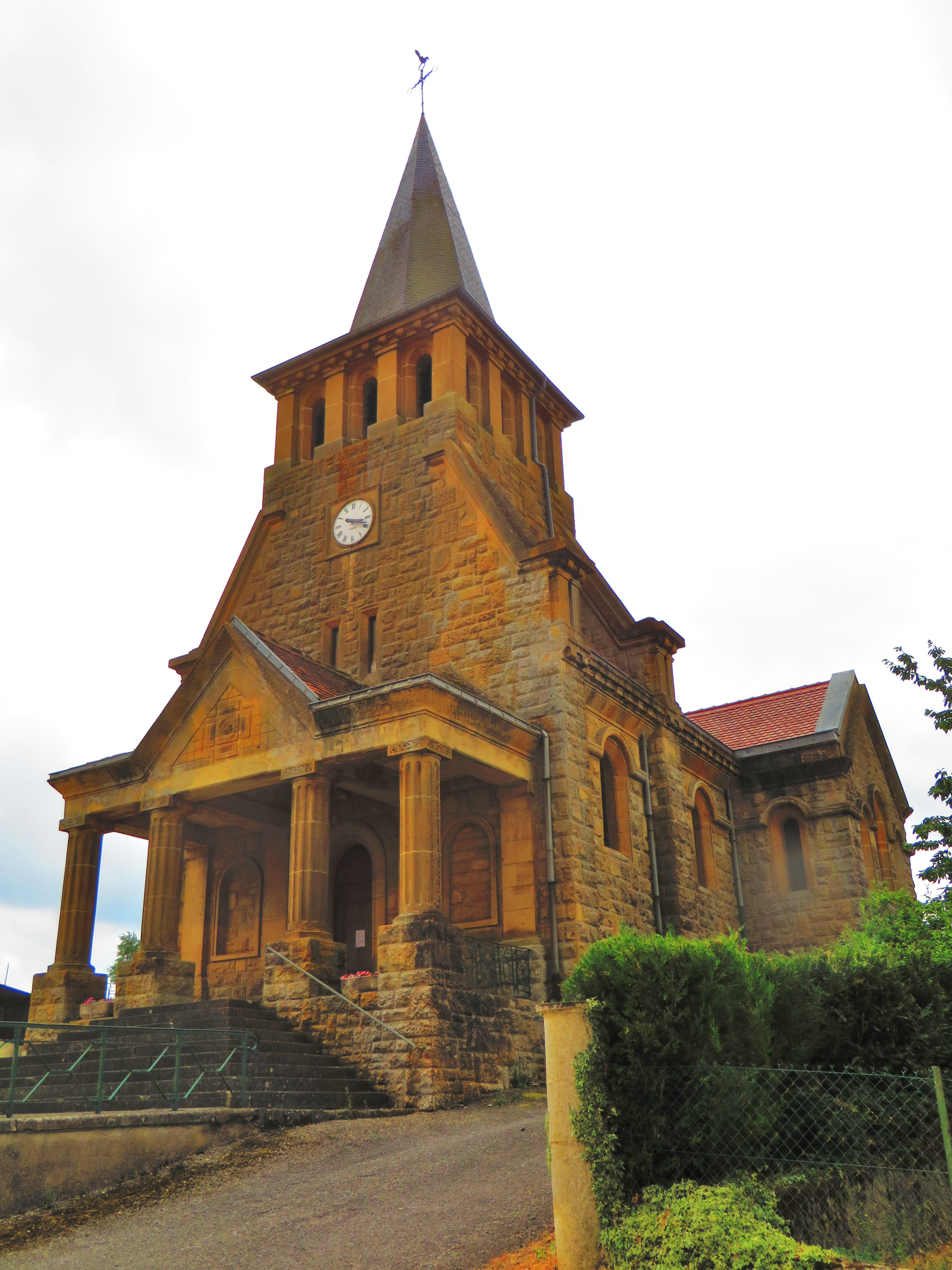
- The church in Ville-devant-Chaumont
- Location of Ville-devant-Chaumont
- Location within France Location within Grand Est
- Coordinates: 49°17′41″N 5°25′41″E
- Country: France
- Region: Grand Est
- Department: Meuse
- Arrondissement: Verdun
- Canton: Montmédy
- Intercommunality: CC Damvillers Spincourt

Government
  - Mayor (2020–2026): Hervé Dautel
- Area^{1}: 4.21 km^{2} (1.63 sq mi)
- Elevation: 230 m (750 ft)
- Highest elevation: 323 m (1,060 ft)
- Lowest elevation: 229 m (751 ft)
- Population (2023): 49
  - Density: 12/km^{2} (30/sq mi)
- Time zone: UTC+01:00 (CET)
  - Summer (DST): UTC+02:00 (CEST)
- INSEE/Postal code: 55556 /55150
- ^{1} French Land Register data, which excludes lakes, ponds, glaciers > 1 km^{2} (0.386 sq mi or 247 acres) and river estuaries.

Ville-devant-Chaumont (French pronunciation: [vil dəvɑ̃ ʃomɔ̃], lit. 'Ville before Chaumont') is a commune in the Meuse department in Grand Est in north-eastern France.

== See also ==
- Communes of the Meuse department
