= Étraye =

- Commune
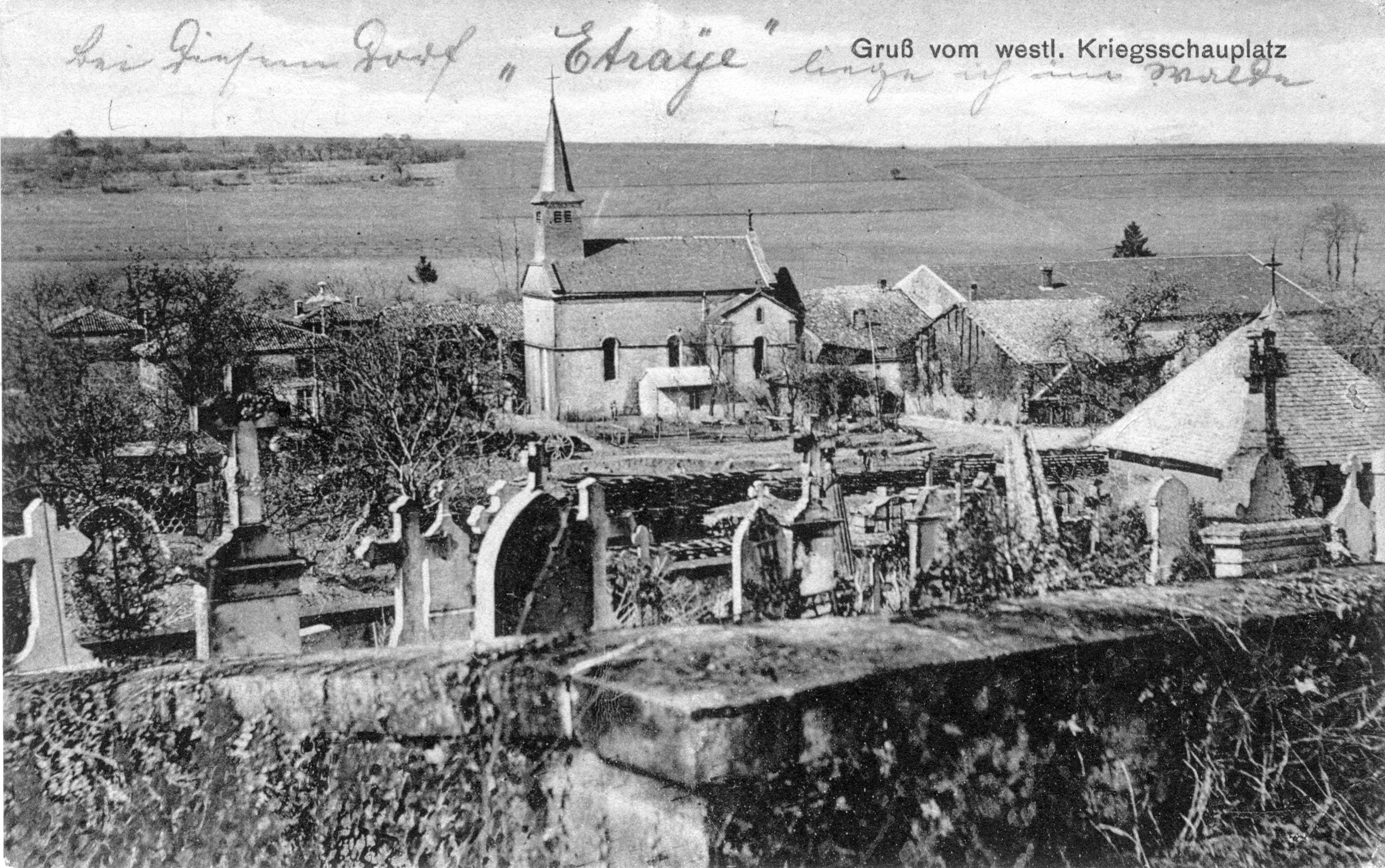
- Old postcard
- Location of Étraye
- Location within France Location within Grand Est
- Coordinates: 49°20′02″N 5°22′19″E
- Country: France
- Region: Grand Est
- Department: Meuse
- Arrondissement: Verdun
- Canton: Montmédy
- Intercommunality: CC Damvillers Spincourt

Government
  - Mayor (2020–2026): Cyrille Glory
- Area^{1}: 7.99 km^{2} (3.08 sq mi)
- Elevation: 228 m (748 ft)
- Highest elevation: 373 m (1,224 ft)
- Lowest elevation: 216 m (709 ft)
- Population (2023): 40
  - Density: 5.0/km^{2} (13/sq mi)
- Time zone: UTC+01:00 (CET)
  - Summer (DST): UTC+02:00 (CEST)
- INSEE/Postal code: 55183 /55150
- ^{1} French Land Register data, which excludes lakes, ponds, glaciers > 1 km^{2} (0.386 sq mi or 247 acres) and river estuaries.

Étraye (French pronunciation: [etʁɛ]) is a commune in the Meuse department in Grand Est in north-eastern France.

== See also ==
- Communes of the Meuse department
