= Iré-le-Sec =

- Commune
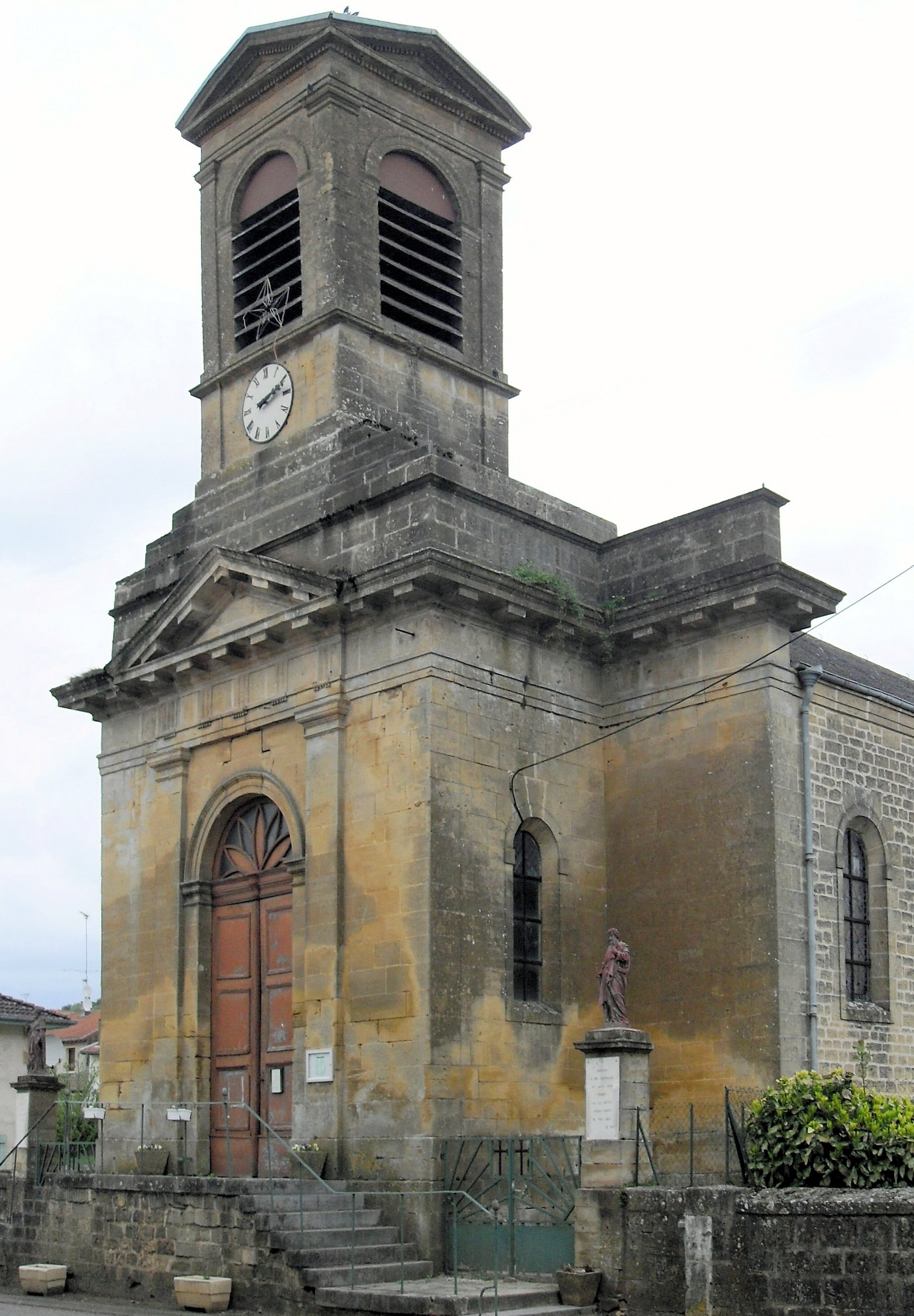
- The church in Iré-le-Sec
- Location of Iré-le-Sec
- Location within France Location within Grand Est
- Coordinates: 49°28′37″N 5°23′19″E
- Country: France
- Region: Grand Est
- Department: Meuse
- Arrondissement: Verdun
- Canton: Montmédy
- Intercommunality: CC du pays de Montmédy

Government
  - Mayor (2020–2026): Damien Blondin
- Area^{1}: 8.31 km^{2} (3.21 sq mi)
- Elevation: 232 m (761 ft)
- Highest elevation: 331 m (1,086 ft)
- Lowest elevation: 220 m (720 ft)
- Population (2023): 144
  - Density: 17.3/km^{2} (44.9/sq mi)
- Time zone: UTC+01:00 (CET)
  - Summer (DST): UTC+02:00 (CEST)
- INSEE/Postal code: 55252 /55600
- ^{1} French Land Register data, which excludes lakes, ponds, glaciers > 1 km^{2} (0.386 sq mi or 247 acres) and river estuaries.

Iré-le-Sec (French pronunciation: [iʁe lə sɛk]) is a commune in the Meuse department in Grand Est in north-eastern France.

== See also ==
- Communes of the Meuse department
