= Gremilly =

- Commune
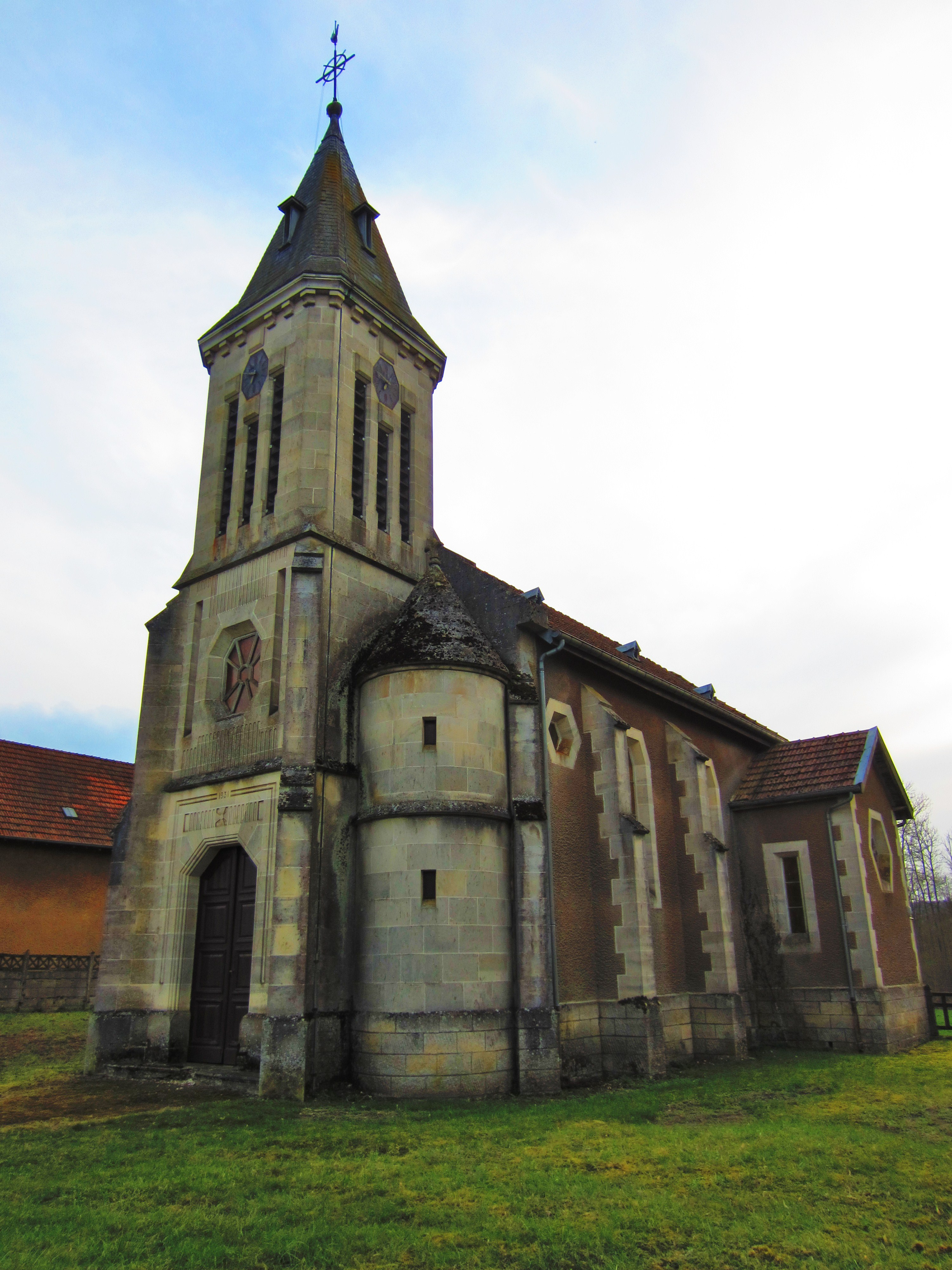
- The church in Gremilly

- Coat of arms
- Location of Gremilly
- Location within France Location within Grand Est
- Coordinates: 49°16′40″N 5°28′40″E
- Country: France
- Region: Grand Est
- Department: Meuse
- Arrondissement: Verdun
- Canton: Montmédy
- Intercommunality: CC Damvillers Spincourt

Government
  - Mayor (2020–2026): Laurence Claude
- Area^{1}: 17.81 km^{2} (6.88 sq mi)
- Elevation: 244 m (801 ft)
- Highest elevation: 303 m (994 ft)
- Lowest elevation: 208 m (682 ft)
- Population (2023): 40
  - Density: 2.2/km^{2} (5.8/sq mi)
- Time zone: UTC+01:00 (CET)
  - Summer (DST): UTC+02:00 (CEST)
- INSEE/Postal code: 55218 /55150
- ^{1} French Land Register data, which excludes lakes, ponds, glaciers > 1 km^{2} (0.386 sq mi or 247 acres) and river estuaries.

Gremilly (French pronunciation: [ɡʁəmiji]) is a commune in the Meuse department in Grand Est in north-eastern France.

== See also ==
- Communes of the Meuse department
