= Remoiville =

- Commune
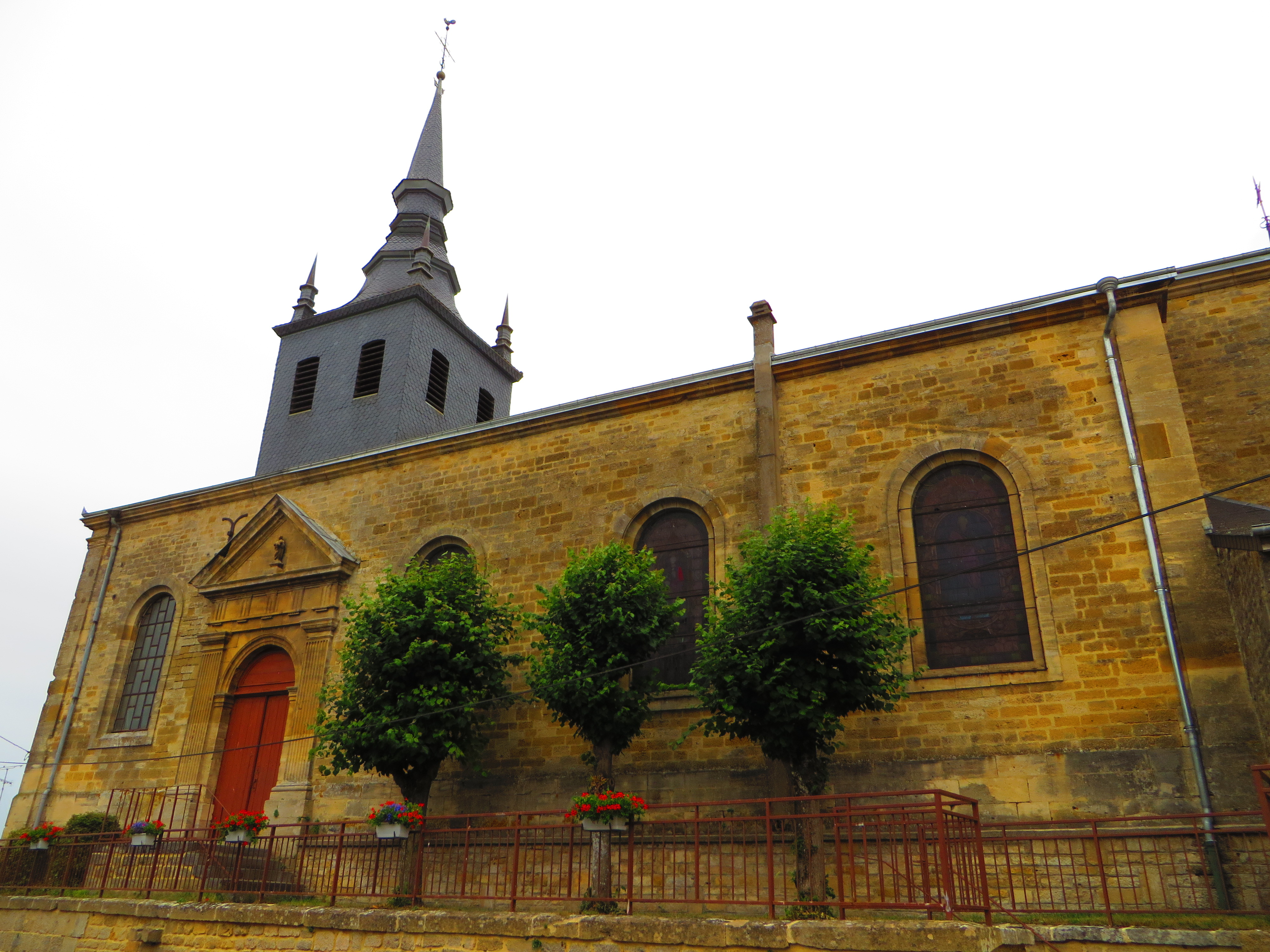
- The church in Remoiville
- Location of Remoiville
- Location within France Location within Grand Est
- Coordinates: 49°26′38″N 5°21′39″E
- Country: France
- Region: Grand Est
- Department: Meuse
- Arrondissement: Verdun
- Canton: Montmédy
- Intercommunality: CC du pays de Montmédy

Government
  - Mayor (2020–2026): Guy Collin
- Area^{1}: 9.7 km^{2} (3.7 sq mi)
- Elevation: 220 m (720 ft)
- Highest elevation: 280 m (920 ft)
- Lowest elevation: 187 m (614 ft)
- Population (2023): 128
  - Density: 13/km^{2} (34/sq mi)
- Time zone: UTC+01:00 (CET)
  - Summer (DST): UTC+02:00 (CEST)
- INSEE/Postal code: 55425 /55600
- ^{1} French Land Register data, which excludes lakes, ponds, glaciers > 1 km^{2} (0.386 sq mi or 247 acres) and river estuaries.

Remoiville (French pronunciation: [ʁəmwavil]) is a commune in the Meuse department in Grand Est in north-eastern France.

== See also ==
- Communes of the Meuse department
