= Écurey-en-Verdunois =

- Commune
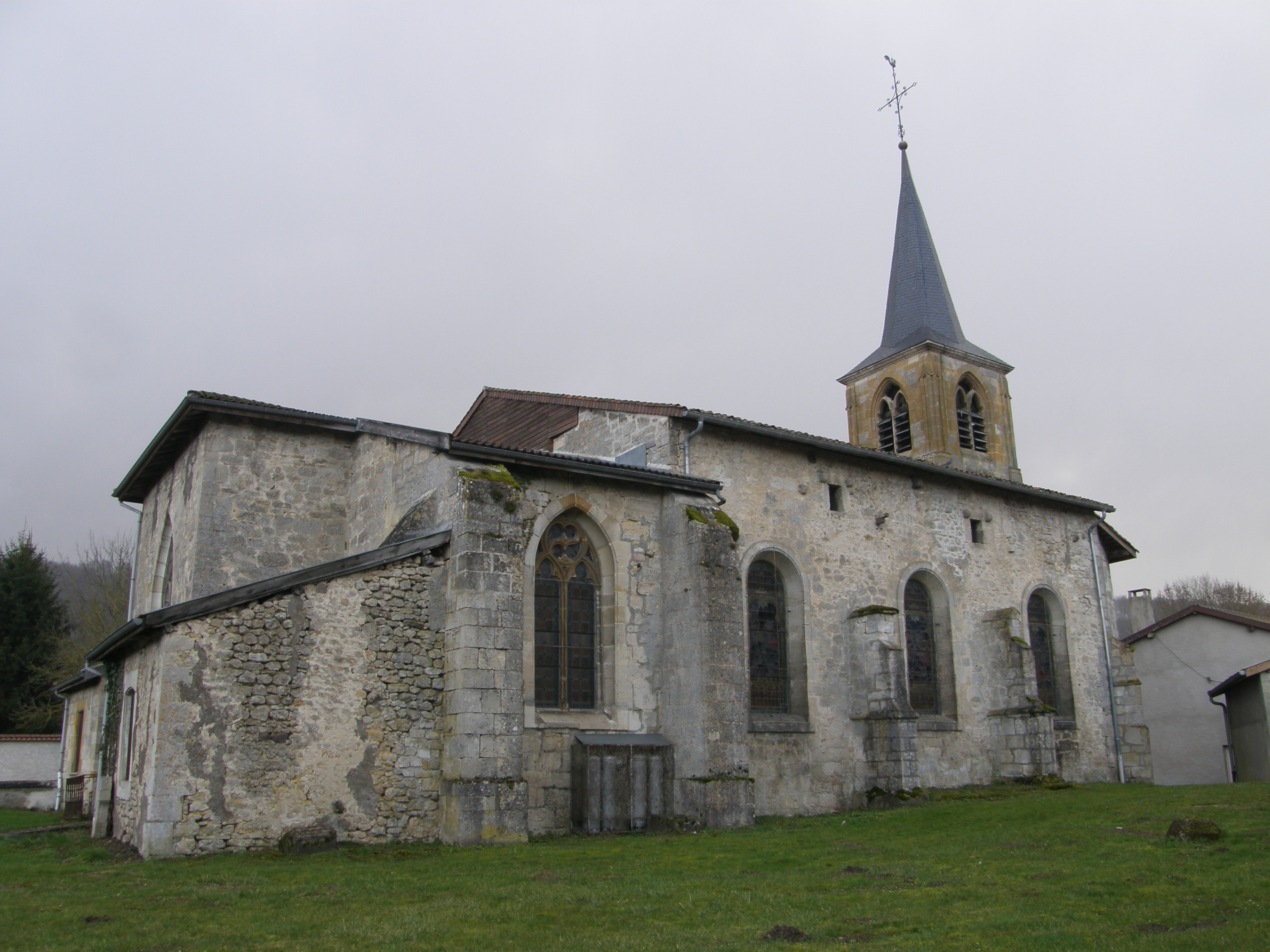
- The church in Écurey-en-Verdunois
- Location of Écurey-en-Verdunois
- Location within France Location within Grand Est
- Coordinates: 49°21′50″N 5°21′02″E
- Country: France
- Region: Grand Est
- Department: Meuse
- Arrondissement: Verdun
- Canton: Montmédy
- Intercommunality: CC Damvillers Spincourt

Government
  - Mayor (2020–2026): Christian Thiebaut
- Area^{1}: 6.92 km^{2} (2.67 sq mi)
- Highest elevation: 387 m (1,270 ft)
- Lowest elevation: 202 m (663 ft)
- Population (2023): 115
  - Density: 16.6/km^{2} (43.0/sq mi)
- Time zone: UTC+01:00 (CET)
  - Summer (DST): UTC+02:00 (CEST)
- INSEE/Postal code: 55170 /55150
- ^{1} French Land Register data, which excludes lakes, ponds, glaciers > 1 km^{2} (0.386 sq mi or 247 acres) and river estuaries.

Écurey-en-Verdunois (French pronunciation: [ekyʁɛ ɑ̃ vɛʁdynwa]) is a commune in the Meuse department in Grand Est in north-eastern France.

== See also ==
- Communes of the Meuse department
