= Merles-sur-Loison =

- Commune
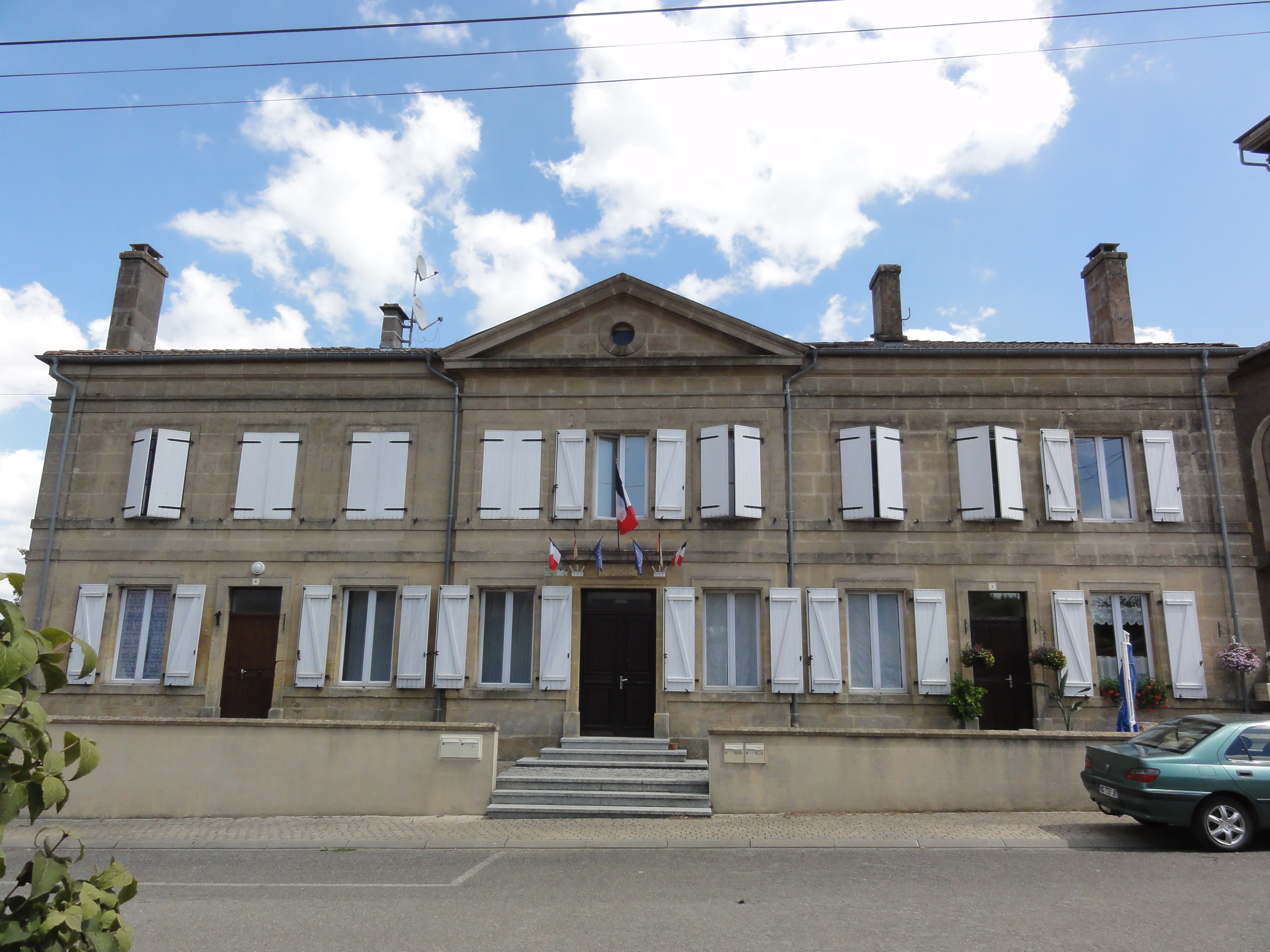
- The town hall in Merles-sur-Loison
- Location of Merles-sur-Loison
- Location within France Location within Grand Est
- Coordinates: 49°22′46″N 5°28′53″E
- Country: France
- Region: Grand Est
- Department: Meuse
- Arrondissement: Verdun
- Canton: Montmédy
- Intercommunality: CC Damvillers Spincourt

Government
  - Mayor (2020–2026): Gérard Hauptmann
- Area^{1}: 11.45 km^{2} (4.42 sq mi)
- Elevation: 264 m (866 ft)
- Highest elevation: 223 m (732 ft)
- Lowest elevation: 197 m (646 ft)
- Population (2023): 144
  - Density: 12.6/km^{2} (32.6/sq mi)
- Time zone: UTC+01:00 (CET)
  - Summer (DST): UTC+02:00 (CEST)
- INSEE/Postal code: 55336 /55150
- ^{1} French Land Register data, which excludes lakes, ponds, glaciers > 1 km^{2} (0.386 sq mi or 247 acres) and river estuaries.

Merles-sur-Loison (French pronunciation: [mɛʁl syʁ lwazɔ̃]) is a commune in the Meuse department in Grand Est in north-eastern France.

== See also ==
- Communes of the Meuse department
