= Réville-aux-Bois =

- Commune
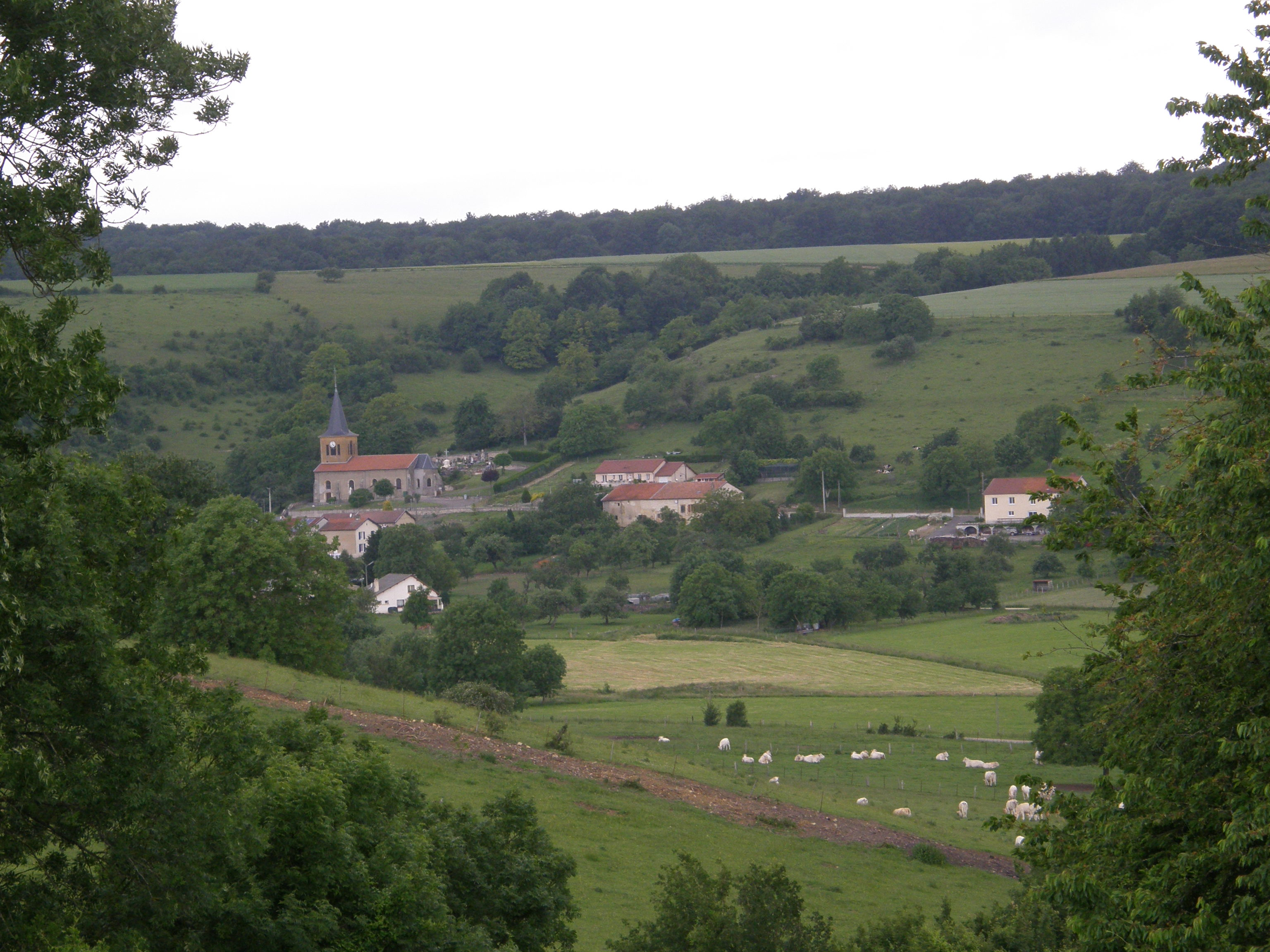
- A general view of Réville-aux-Bois
- Location of Réville-aux-Bois
- Location within France Location within Grand Est
- Coordinates: 49°20′51″N 5°21′29″E
- Country: France
- Region: Grand Est
- Department: Meuse
- Arrondissement: Verdun
- Canton: Montmédy
- Intercommunality: CC Damvillers Spincourt

Government
  - Mayor (2020–2026): Alain Perignon
- Area^{1}: 11.03 km^{2} (4.26 sq mi)
- Elevation: 220 m (720 ft)
- Highest elevation: 378 m (1,240 ft)
- Lowest elevation: 209 m (686 ft)
- Population (2023): 133
  - Density: 12.1/km^{2} (31.2/sq mi)
- Time zone: UTC+01:00 (CET)
  - Summer (DST): UTC+02:00 (CEST)
- INSEE/Postal code: 55428 /55150
- ^{1} French Land Register data, which excludes lakes, ponds, glaciers > 1 km^{2} (0.386 sq mi or 247 acres) and river estuaries.

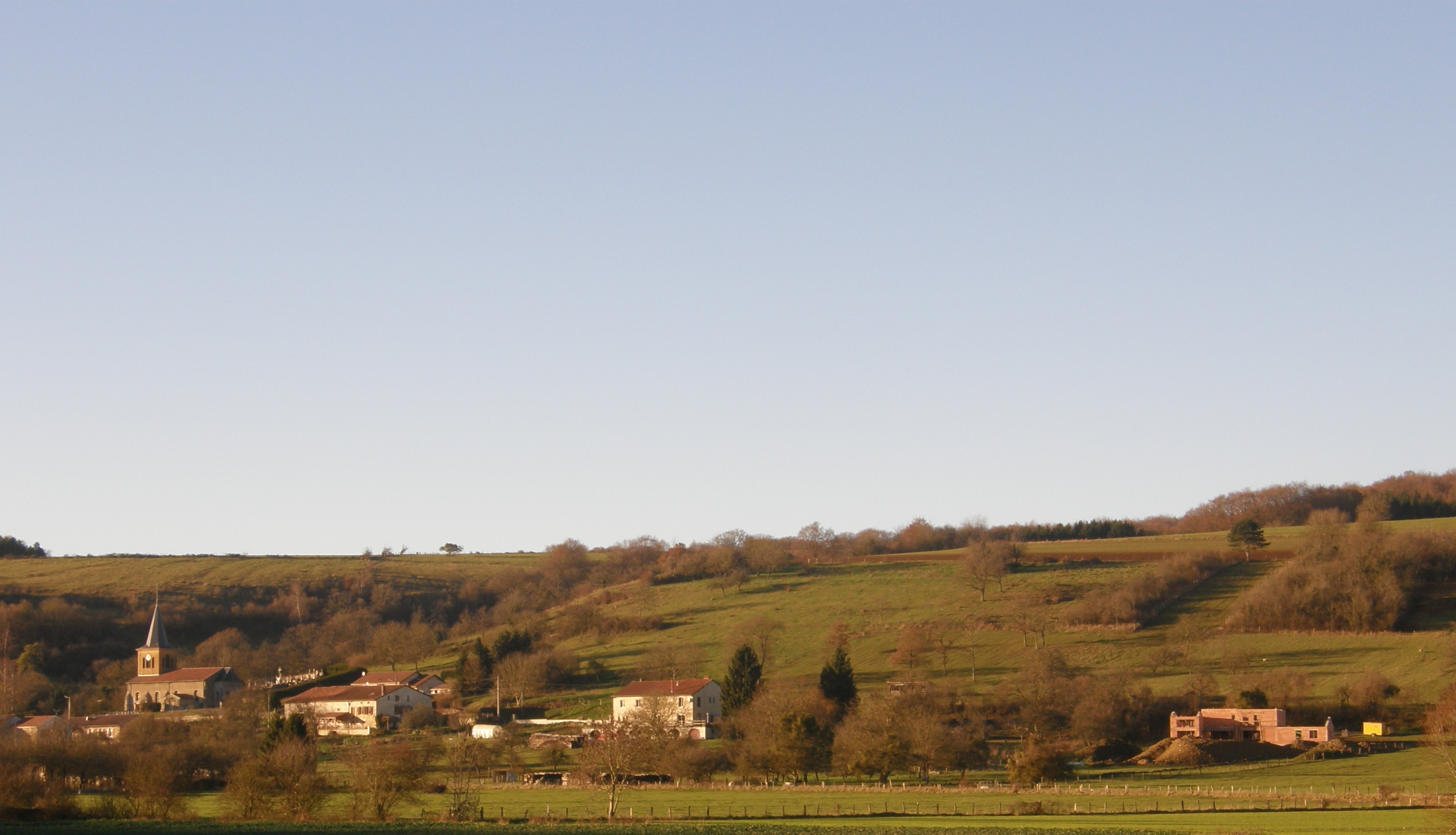
A view of Réville-aux-Bois (Dec. 2013)

Réville-aux-Bois (French pronunciation: [ʁevil o bwa]) is a commune in the Meuse department in Grand Est in north-eastern France.

== See also ==
- Communes of the Meuse department
