= Thonne-le-Thil =

- Commune
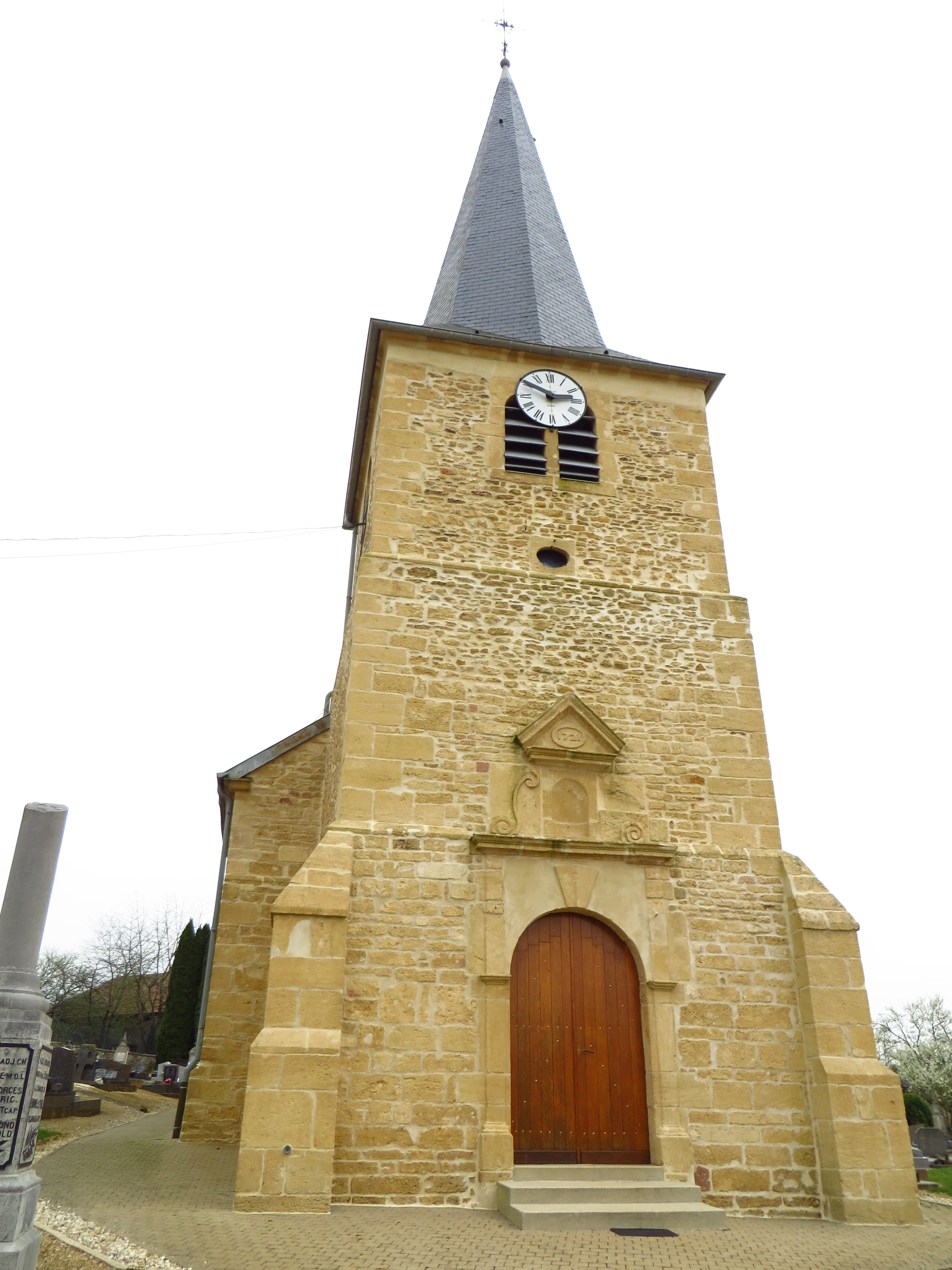
- The church in Thonne-le-Thil

- Coat of arms
- Location of Thonne-le-Thil
- Location within France Location within Grand Est
- Coordinates: 49°34′19″N 5°21′00″E
- Country: France
- Region: Grand Est
- Department: Meuse
- Arrondissement: Verdun
- Canton: Montmédy
- Intercommunality: Pays de Montmédy

Government
  - Mayor (2020–2026): François Montlibert
- Area^{1}: 11.38 km^{2} (4.39 sq mi)
- Elevation: 270 m (890 ft)
- Highest elevation: 361 m (1,184 ft)
- Lowest elevation: 197 m (646 ft)
- Population (2023): 277
  - Density: 24.3/km^{2} (63.0/sq mi)
- Time zone: UTC+01:00 (CET)
  - Summer (DST): UTC+02:00 (CEST)
- INSEE/Postal code: 55509 /55600
- ^{1} French Land Register data, which excludes lakes, ponds, glaciers > 1 km^{2} (0.386 sq mi or 247 acres) and river estuaries.

Thonne-le-Thil (French pronunciation: [tɔn lə til]) is a commune in the Meuse department in Grand Est in north-eastern France. The population steadily declined since a peak of nearly one thousand in the mid-1800s, being about 250 inhabitants in 2019.

== See also ==
- Communes of the Meuse department
