= Canton of Montmédy =

Coordinates: 49.52°N 5.36°E

The canton of Montmédy is an administrative division of the Meuse department, northeastern France. Its borders were modified at the French canton reorganisation which came into effect in March 2015. Its seat is in Montmédy.

It consists of the following communes:

1. Avioth
2. Azannes-et-Soumazannes
3. Bazeilles-sur-Othain
4. Brandeville
5. Bréhéville
6. Breux
7. Chaumont-devant-Damvillers
8. Chauvency-le-Château
9. Chauvency-Saint-Hubert
10. Damvillers
11. Delut
12. Dombras
13. Écouviez
14. Écurey-en-Verdunois
15. Étraye
16. Flassigny
17. Gremilly
18. Han-lès-Juvigny
19. Iré-le-Sec
20. Jametz
21. Juvigny-sur-Loison
22. Lissey
23. Louppy-sur-Loison
24. Marville
25. Merles-sur-Loison
26. Moirey-Flabas-Crépion
27. Montmédy
28. Peuvillers
29. Quincy-Landzécourt
30. Remoiville
31. Réville-aux-Bois
32. Romagne-sous-les-Côtes
33. Rupt-sur-Othain
34. Thonne-la-Long
35. Thonne-le-Thil
36. Thonne-les-Près
37. Thonnelle
38. Velosnes
39. Verneuil-Grand
40. Verneuil-Petit
41. Vigneul-sous-Montmédy
42. Villécloye
43. Ville-devant-Chaumont
44. Vittarville
45. Wavrille
