= Louppy-sur-Loison =

- Commune
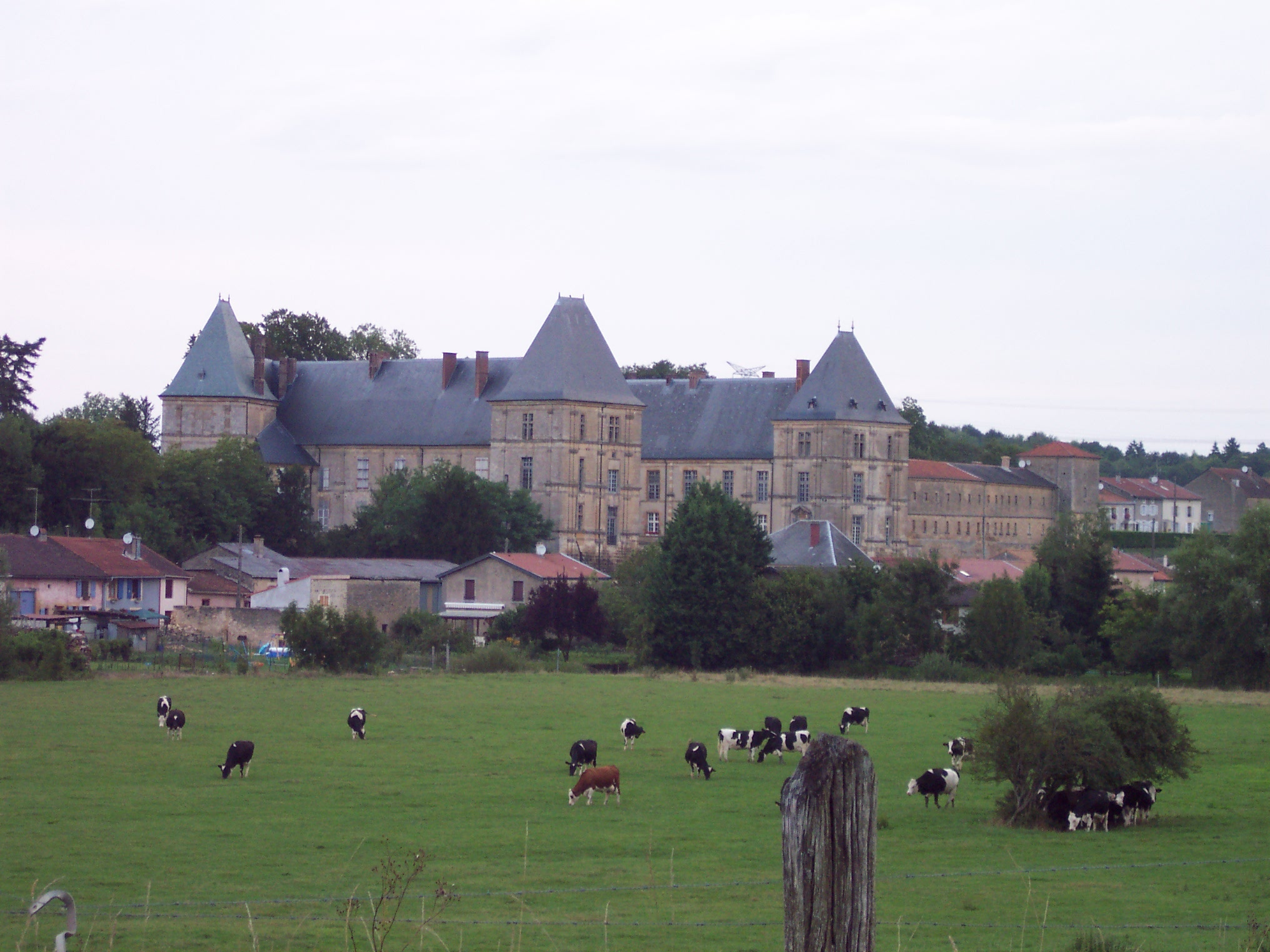
- The castle and the village of Louppy-sur-Loison
- Location of Louppy-sur-Loison
- Location within France Location within Grand Est
- Coordinates: 49°26′42″N 5°20′57″E
- Country: France
- Region: Grand Est
- Department: Meuse
- Arrondissement: Verdun
- Canton: Montmédy
- Intercommunality: CC du pays de Montmédy

Government
  - Mayor (2020–2026): Guy-Joël Chatton
- Area^{1}: 14.36 km^{2} (5.54 sq mi)
- Elevation: 187 m (614 ft)
- Highest elevation: 275 m (902 ft)
- Lowest elevation: 182 m (597 ft)
- Population (2023): 124
  - Density: 8.64/km^{2} (22.4/sq mi)
- Time zone: UTC+01:00 (CET)
  - Summer (DST): UTC+02:00 (CEST)
- INSEE/Postal code: 55306 /55600
- ^{1} French Land Register data, which excludes lakes, ponds, glaciers > 1 km^{2} (0.386 sq mi or 247 acres) and river estuaries.

Louppy-sur-Loison (French pronunciation: [lupi syʁ lwazɔ̃]) is a commune in the Meuse department in Grand Est in north-eastern France.

== See also ==
- Communes of the Meuse department
