= Thonne-la-Long =

- Commune
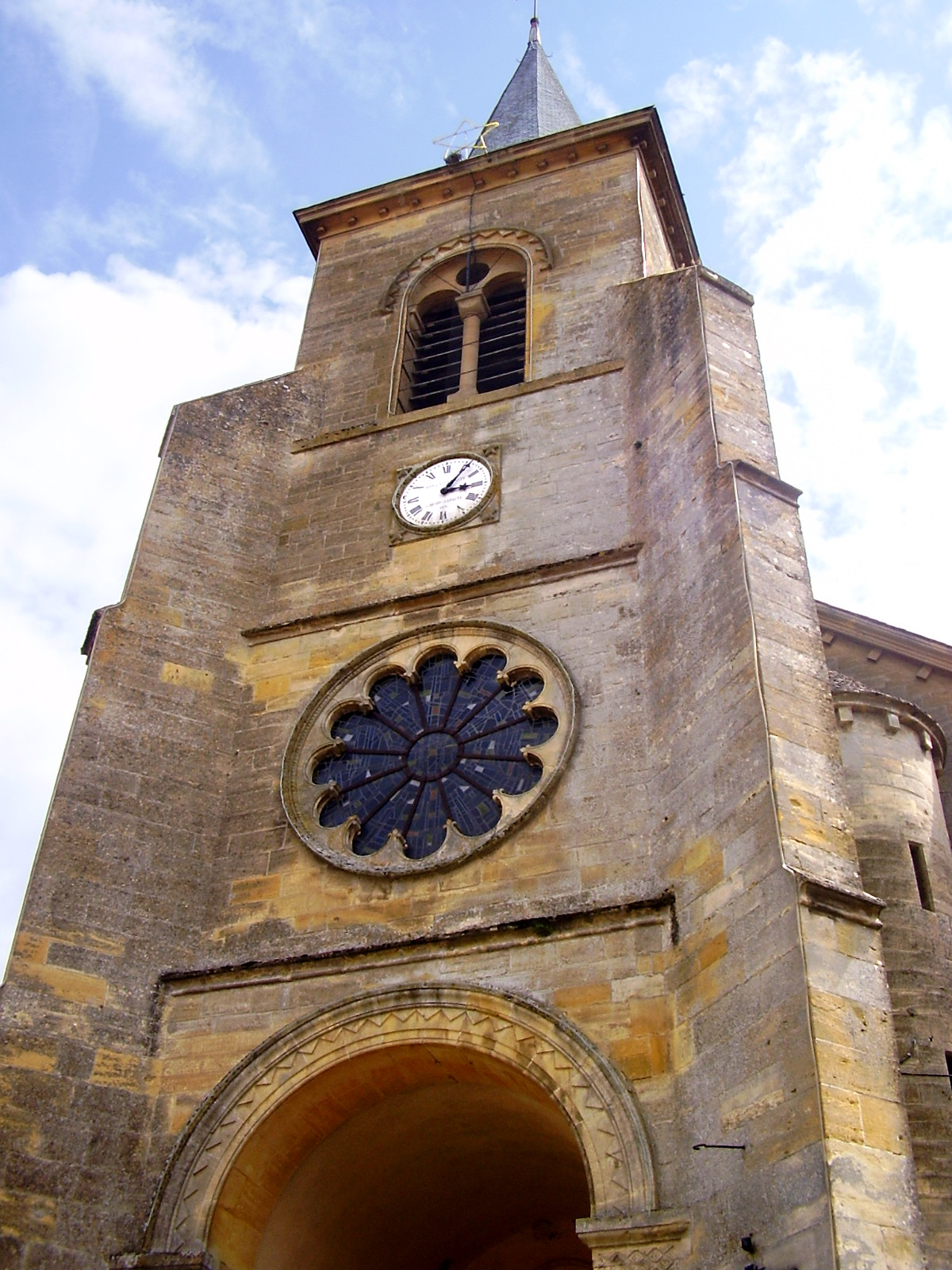
- The church in Thonne-la-Long

- Coat of arms
- Location of Thonne-la-Long
- Location within France Location within Grand Est
- Coordinates: 49°33′44″N 5°25′35″E
- Country: France
- Region: Grand Est
- Department: Meuse
- Arrondissement: Verdun
- Canton: Montmédy
- Intercommunality: CC du pays de Montmédy

Government
  - Mayor (2021–2026): Fabienne Thiery
- Area^{1}: 9.5 km^{2} (3.7 sq mi)
- Elevation: 211 m (692 ft)
- Highest elevation: 349 m (1,145 ft)
- Lowest elevation: 207 m (679 ft)
- Population (2023): 362
  - Density: 38/km^{2} (99/sq mi)
- Time zone: UTC+01:00 (CET)
  - Summer (DST): UTC+02:00 (CEST)
- INSEE/Postal code: 55508 /55600
- ^{1} French Land Register data, which excludes lakes, ponds, glaciers > 1 km^{2} (0.386 sq mi or 247 acres) and river estuaries.

Thonne-la-Long (French pronunciation: [tɔn la lɔ̃]) is a commune in the Meuse department in Grand Est in north-eastern France.

== See also ==
- Communes of the Meuse department
