= Wavrille =

- Commune
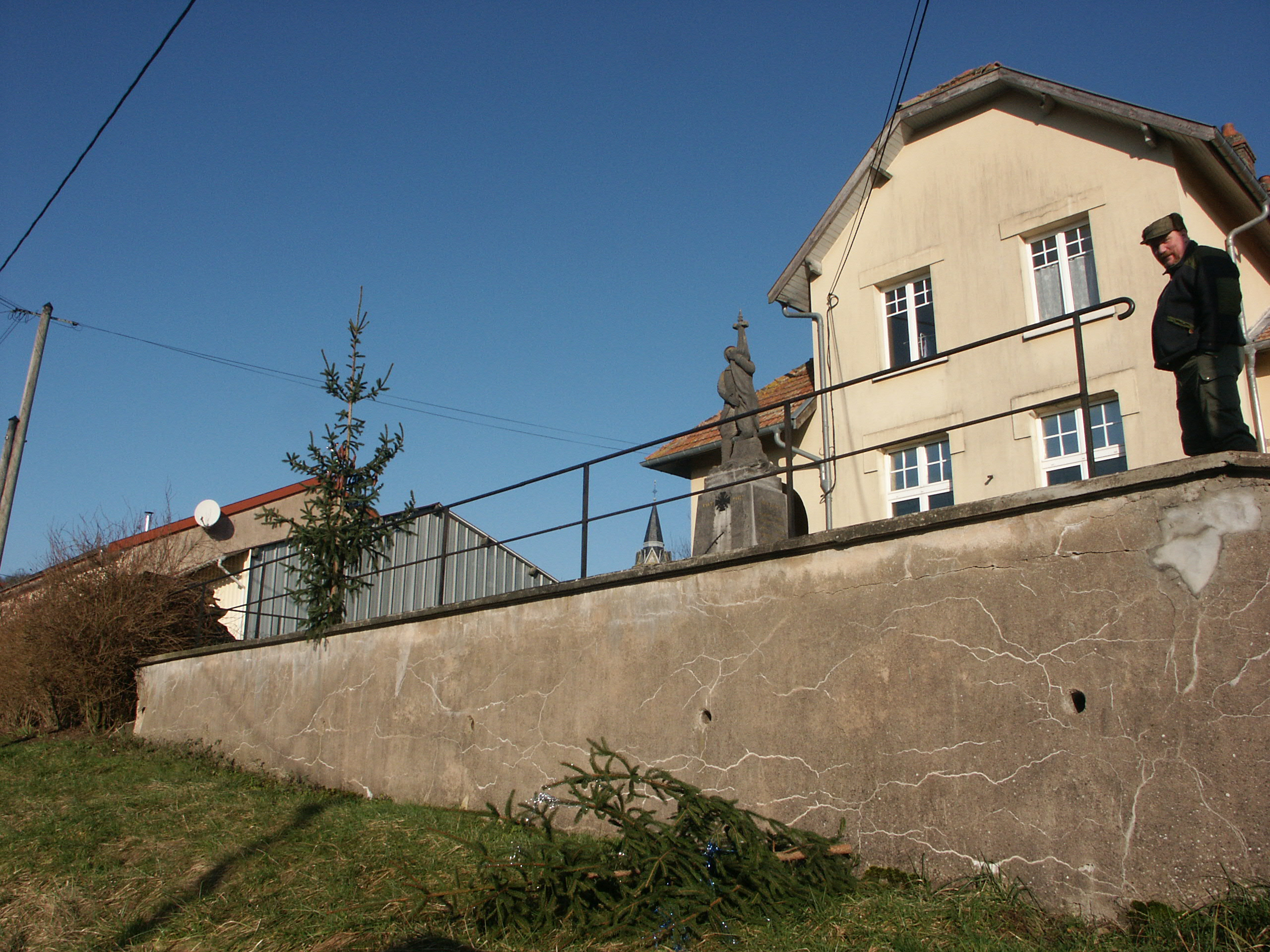
- The town hall in Wavrille
- Location of Wavrille
- Location within France Location within Grand Est
- Coordinates: 49°19′42″N 5°23′24″E
- Country: France
- Region: Grand Est
- Department: Meuse
- Arrondissement: Verdun
- Canton: Montmédy
- Intercommunality: Damvillers Spincourt

Government
  - Mayor (2020–2026): Ernest Furina
- Area^{1}: 5.31 km^{2} (2.05 sq mi)
- Elevation: 228 m (748 ft)
- Highest elevation: 361 m (1,184 ft)
- Lowest elevation: 210 m (690 ft)
- Population (2023): 47
  - Density: 8.9/km^{2} (23/sq mi)
- Time zone: UTC+01:00 (CET)
  - Summer (DST): UTC+02:00 (CEST)
- INSEE/Postal code: 55580 /55150
- ^{1} French Land Register data, which excludes lakes, ponds, glaciers > 1 km^{2} (0.386 sq mi or 247 acres) and river estuaries.

Wavrille is a commune in the Meuse department in Grand Est in north-eastern France.

== Population ==
Historical population
| Year | Pop. | ±% p.a. |
|---|---|---|
| 1968 | 60 | — |
| 1975 | 52 | −2.02% |
| 1982 | 44 | −2.36% |
| 1990 | 41 | −0.88% |
| 1999 | 49 | +2.00% |
| 2007 | 45 | −1.06% |
| 2012 | 46 | +0.44% |
| 2017 | 50 | +1.68% |
| 2023 | 47 | −1.03% |
Source: INSEE

== See also ==
- Communes of the Meuse department
