= Peuvillers =

- Commune
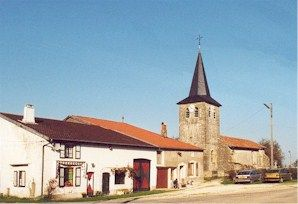
- The church and surroundings in Peuvillers
- Location of Peuvillers
- Location within France Location within Grand Est
- Coordinates: 49°22′15″N 5°23′41″E
- Country: France
- Region: Grand Est
- Department: Meuse
- Arrondissement: Verdun
- Canton: Montmédy
- Intercommunality: CC Damvillers Spincourt

Government
  - Mayor (2020–2026): Matthieu Nivelet
- Area^{1}: 4.86 km^{2} (1.88 sq mi)
- Elevation: 197 m (646 ft)
- Highest elevation: 216 m (709 ft)
- Lowest elevation: 194 m (636 ft)
- Population (2023): 60
  - Density: 12/km^{2} (32/sq mi)
- Time zone: UTC+01:00 (CET)
  - Summer (DST): UTC+02:00 (CEST)
- INSEE/Postal code: 55403 /55150
- ^{1} French Land Register data, which excludes lakes, ponds, glaciers > 1 km^{2} (0.386 sq mi or 247 acres) and river estuaries.

Peuvillers is a commune in the Meuse department in Grand Est in north-eastern France.

== History ==
Peuvillers was a part of French Luxembourg from 1659 until 1790, in the bailiwick of Marville. The hospital of 14th Foot Artillery Regiment was located in Peuvillers where the German NCO Heinrich Wilhelm Koch died at the age of 20. He was buried in January 1917 at the Ladhof Cemetery in Colmar, Alsace, where his family lived.

== Gallery ==
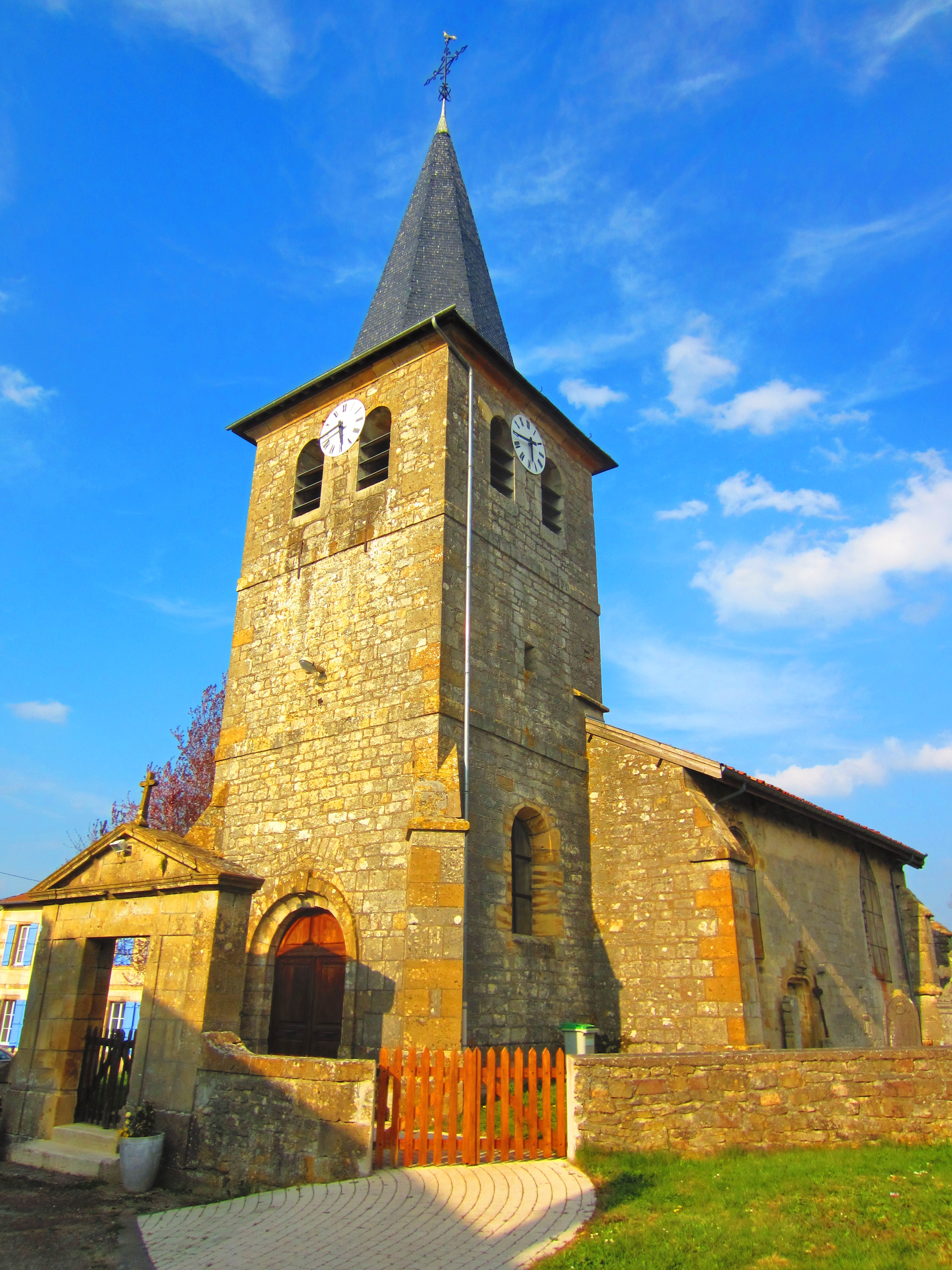
Eglise Peuvillers

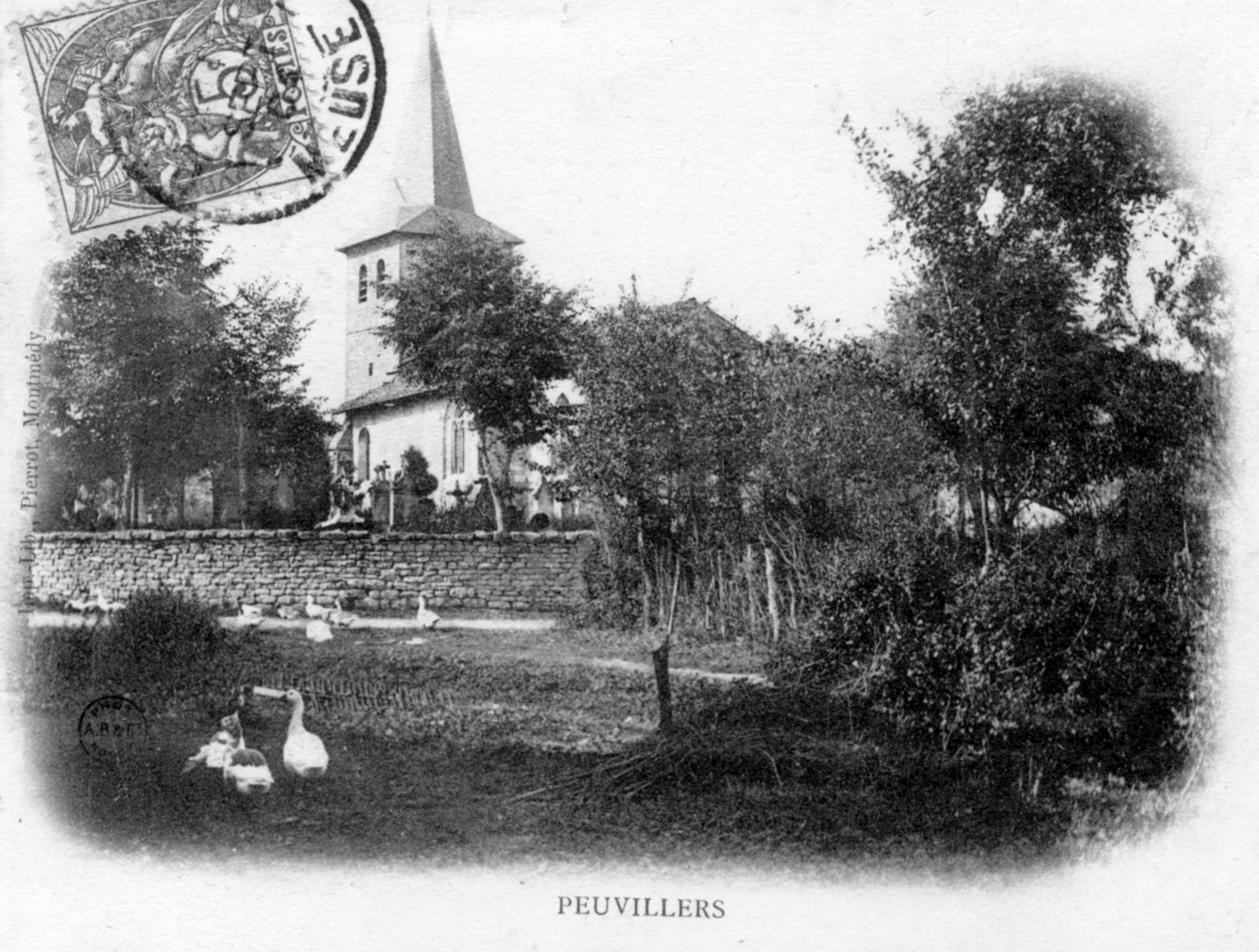
Peuvillers

== See also ==
- Communes of the Meuse department
