= Han-lès-Juvigny =

- Commune
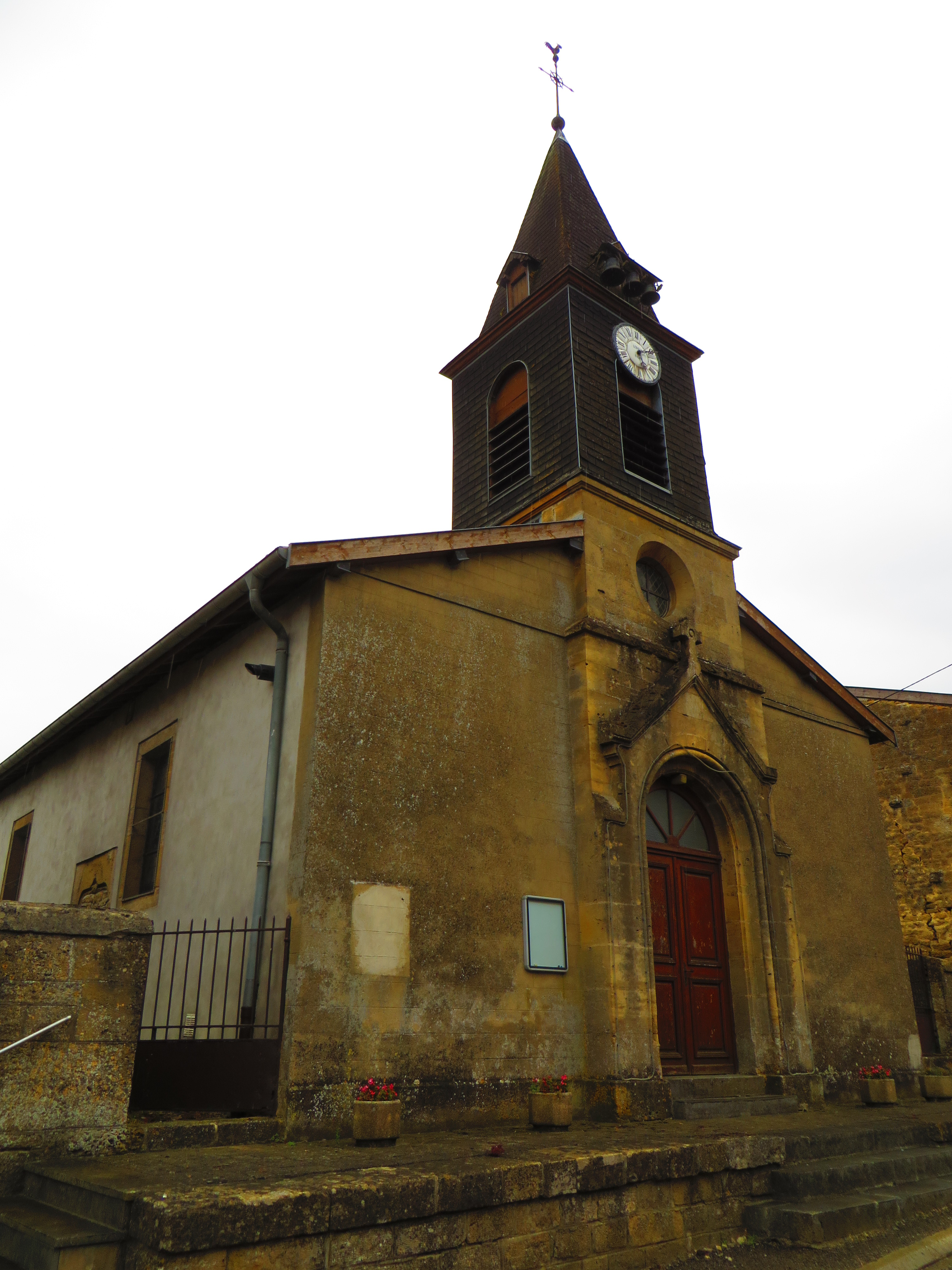
- The church in Han-lès-Juvigny

- Coat of arms
- Location of Han-lès-Juvigny
- Location within France Location within Grand Est
- Coordinates: 49°28′54″N 5°19′59″E
- Country: France
- Region: Grand Est
- Department: Meuse
- Arrondissement: Verdun
- Canton: Montmédy
- Intercommunality: CC du pays de Montmédy

Government
  - Mayor (2020–2026): Christian Saunois
- Area^{1}: 5.44 km^{2} (2.10 sq mi)
- Elevation: 310 m (1,020 ft)
- Highest elevation: 308 m (1,010 ft)
- Lowest elevation: 177 m (581 ft)
- Population (2023): 126
  - Density: 23.2/km^{2} (60.0/sq mi)
- Time zone: UTC+01:00 (CET)
  - Summer (DST): UTC+02:00 (CEST)
- INSEE/Postal code: 55226 /55600
- ^{1} French Land Register data, which excludes lakes, ponds, glaciers > 1 km^{2} (0.386 sq mi or 247 acres) and river estuaries.

Han-lès-Juvigny (French pronunciation: [ɑ̃ lɛ ʒyviɲi]) is a commune in the Meuse department in Grand Est in north-eastern France.

== See also ==
- Communes of the Meuse department
