= Bréhéville =

- Commune
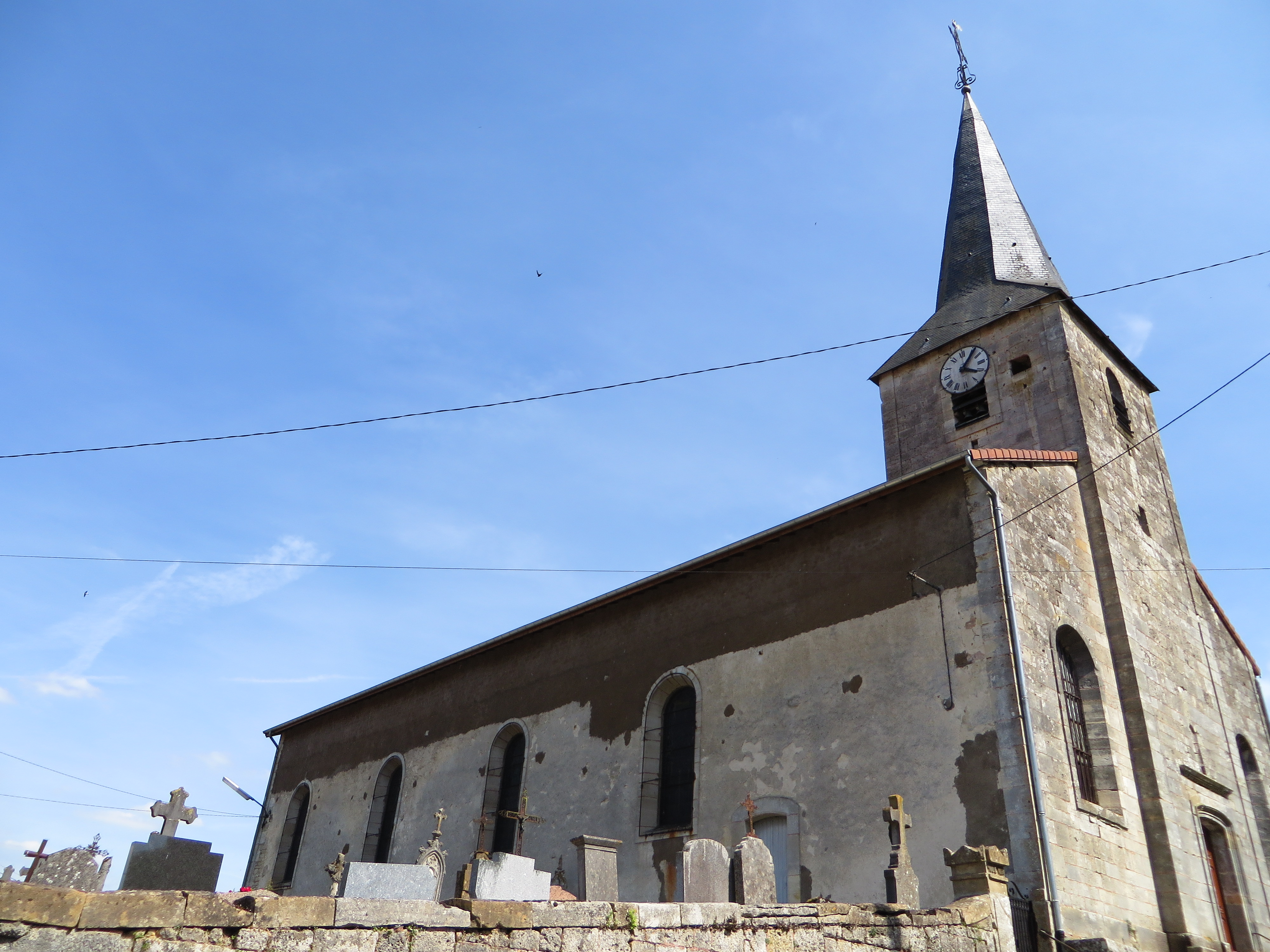
- The church in Bréhéville
- Location of Bréhéville
- Location within France Location within Grand Est
- Coordinates: 49°22′59″N 5°19′48″E
- Country: France
- Region: Grand Est
- Department: Meuse
- Arrondissement: Verdun
- Canton: Montmédy
- Intercommunality: Damvillers Spincourt

Government
  - Mayor (2020–2026): Gilberte Ballieu
- Area^{1}: 18.33 km^{2} (7.08 sq mi)
- Elevation: 240 m (790 ft)
- Highest elevation: 387 m (1,270 ft)
- Lowest elevation: 192 m (630 ft)
- Population (2023): 187
  - Density: 10.2/km^{2} (26.4/sq mi)
- Time zone: UTC+01:00 (CET)
  - Summer (DST): UTC+02:00 (CEST)
- INSEE/Postal code: 55076 /55150
- ^{1} French Land Register data, which excludes lakes, ponds, glaciers > 1 km^{2} (0.386 sq mi or 247 acres) and river estuaries.

Bréhéville (French pronunciation: [bʁe.evil]) is a commune in the Meuse department in Grand Est in northeastern France.

== Population ==
Historical population
Year	Pop.	±% p.a.
1968	302	—
1975	261	−2.06%
1982	263	+0.11%
1990	250	−0.63%
1999	206	−2.13%
2007	171	−2.30%
2012	190	+2.13%
2017	171	−2.09%
2023	187	+1.50%
Source: INSEE

== See also ==
- Communes of the Meuse department
