= Romagne-sous-les-Côtes =

- Commune
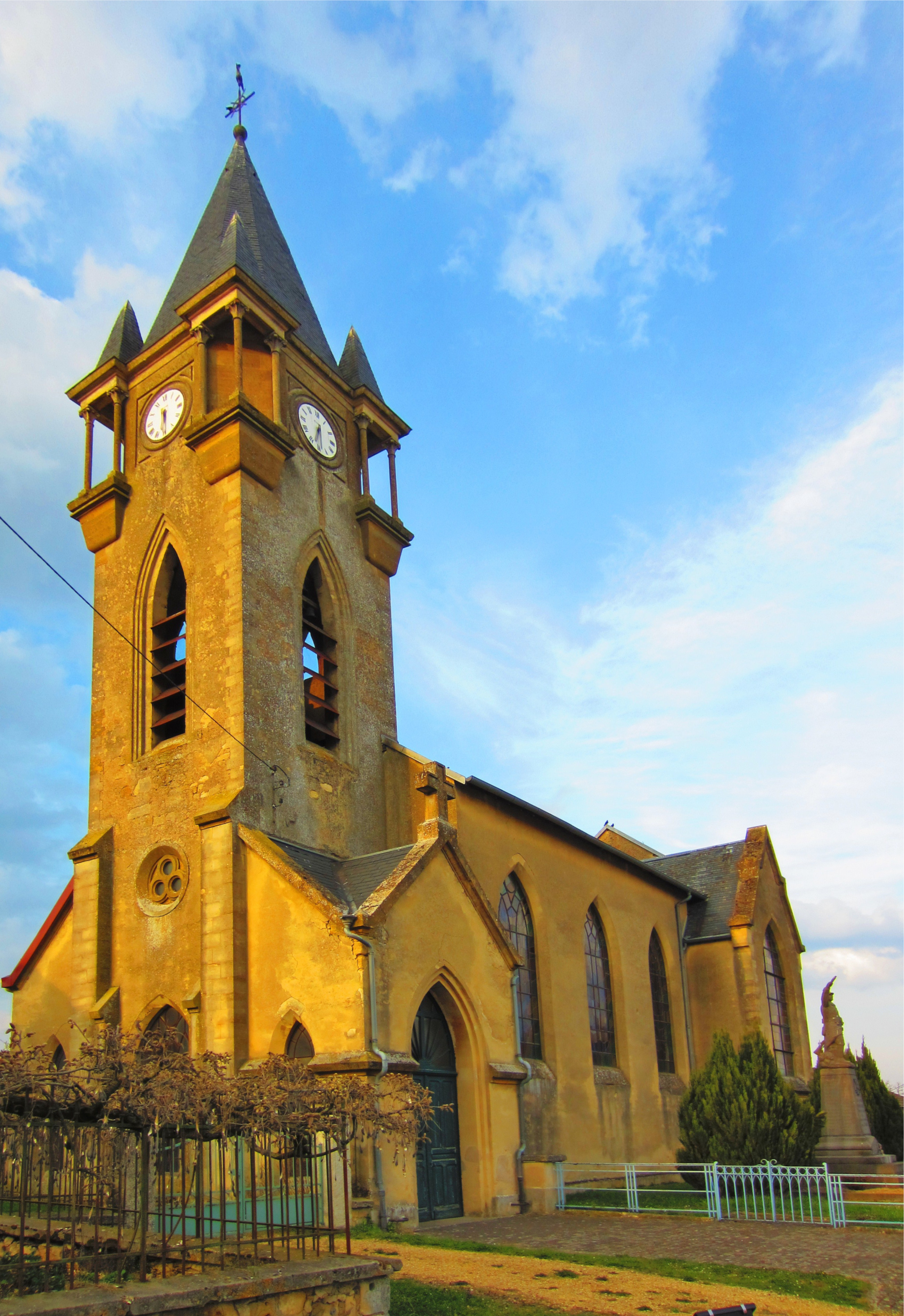
- The church in Romagne-sous-les-Côtes

- Coat of arms
- Location of Romagne-sous-les-Côtes
- Location within France Location within Grand Est
- Coordinates: 49°19′26″N 5°28′15″E
- Country: France
- Region: Grand Est
- Department: Meuse
- Arrondissement: Verdun
- Canton: Montmédy
- Intercommunality: Damvillers-Spincourt

Government
  - Mayor (2020–2026): Évelyne Fauquenot
- Area^{1}: 14.19 km^{2} (5.48 sq mi)
- Elevation: 234 m (768 ft)
- Highest elevation: 361 m (1,184 ft)
- Lowest elevation: 206 m (676 ft)
- Population (2023): 123
  - Density: 8.67/km^{2} (22.5/sq mi)
- Time zone: UTC+01:00 (CET)
  - Summer (DST): UTC+02:00 (CEST)
- INSEE/Postal code: 55437 /55150
- ^{1} French Land Register data, which excludes lakes, ponds, glaciers > 1 km^{2} (0.386 sq mi or 247 acres) and river estuaries.

Romagne-sous-les-Côtes (French pronunciation: [ʁɔmaɲ su le kot]) is a commune in the Meuse department, located in the Grand Est in north-eastern France.

== See also ==
- Communes of the Meuse department
