= Inor =

Inor can refer to:

- Inor language, spoken in Ethiopia
- Inor, Meuse, France
