= Montigny-devant-Sassey =

- Commune
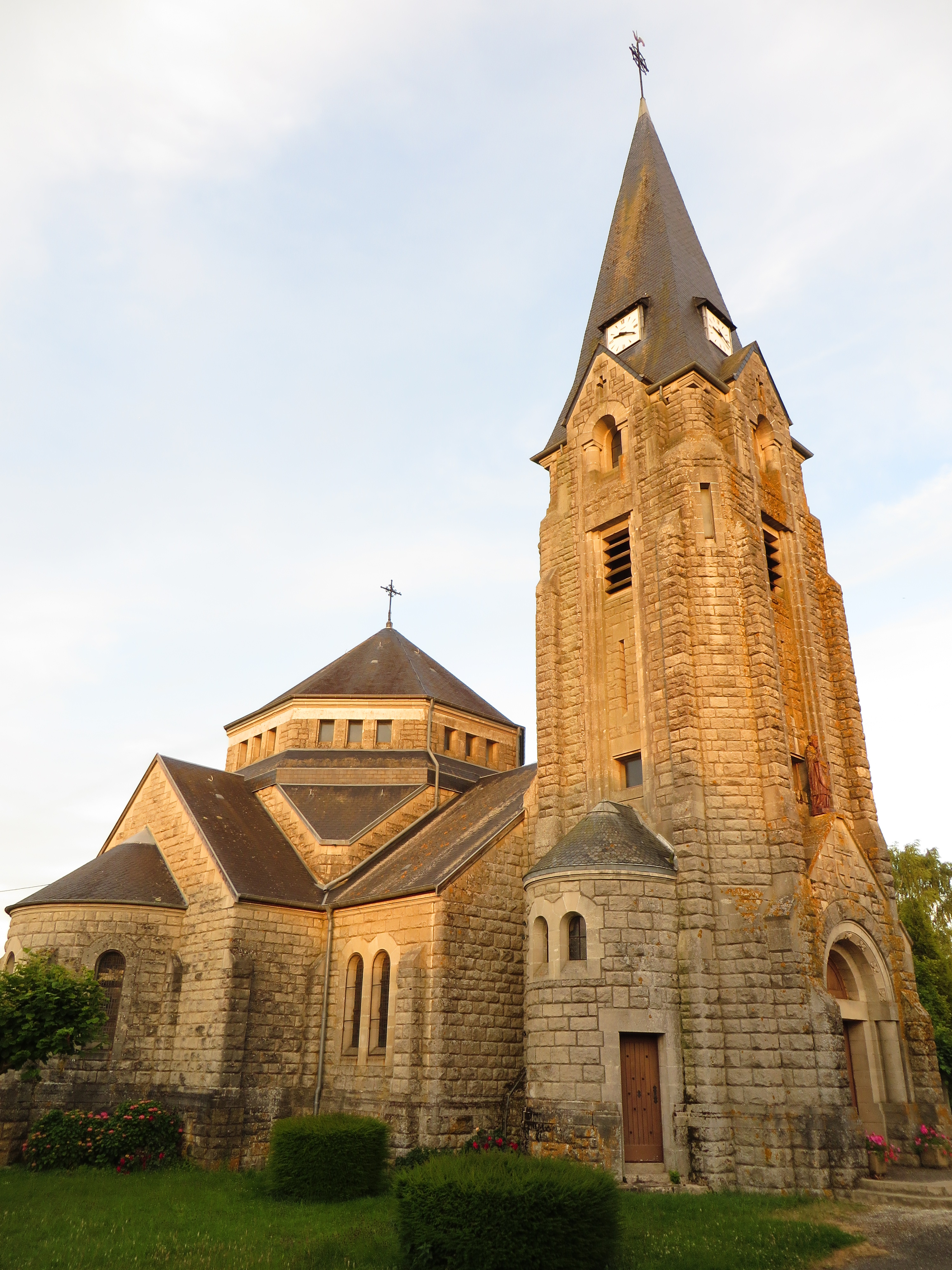
- The church in Montigny-devant-Sassey
- Location of Montigny-devant-Sassey
- Location within France Location within Grand Est
- Coordinates: 49°26′00″N 5°09′10″E
- Country: France
- Region: Grand Est
- Department: Meuse
- Arrondissement: Verdun
- Canton: Stenay
- Intercommunality: CC du Pays de Stenay et du Val Dunois

Government
  - Mayor (2020–2026): Michel Lefort
- Area^{1}: 9.72 km^{2} (3.75 sq mi)
- Highest elevation: 322 m (1,056 ft)
- Lowest elevation: 178 m (584 ft)
- Population (2023): 132
  - Density: 13.6/km^{2} (35.2/sq mi)
- Time zone: UTC+01:00 (CET)
  - Summer (DST): UTC+02:00 (CEST)
- INSEE/Postal code: 55349 /55110
- ^{1} French Land Register data, which excludes lakes, ponds, glaciers > 1 km^{2} (0.386 sq mi or 247 acres) and river estuaries.

Montigny-devant-Sassey (French pronunciation: [mɔ̃tiɲi dəvɑ̃ sasɛ], literally Montigny before Sassey) is a commune in the Meuse department in Grand Est in north-eastern France.

== See also ==
- Communes of the Meuse department
