= Martincourt =

Martincourt is the name or part of the name of the following communes in France:

- Martincourt, Meurthe-et-Moselle, in the Meurthe-et-Moselle department
- Martincourt, Oise, in the Oise department
- Martincourt-sur-Meuse, in the Meuse department
