= Arrondissement of Verdun =

Coordinates: 49°09′N 5°23′E

Verdun
- Arrondissement
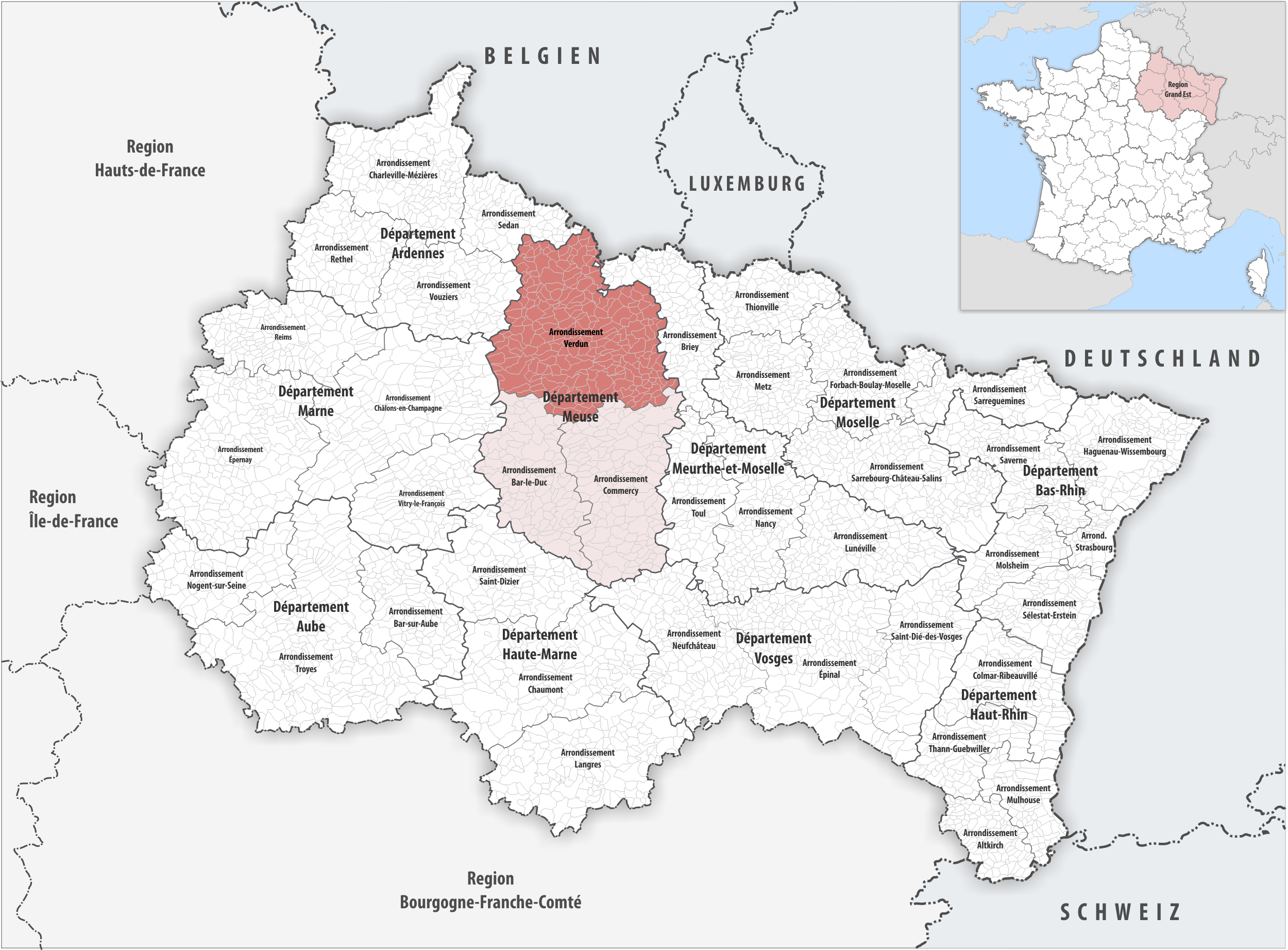
- Location within the region Grand Est
- Country: France
- Region: Grand Est
- Department: Meuse
- No. of communes: {{{nbcomm}}}
- Area: 2,828.6 km^{2} (1,092.1 sq mi)
- Population (2023): 81,994
  - Density: 28.987/km^{2} (75.077/sq mi)
- INSEE code: 553

The arrondissement of Verdun is an arrondissement of France in the Meuse department in the Grand Est region. It has 254 communes. Its population is 82,317 (2021), and its area is 2,828.6 km^{2} (1,092.1 sq mi). Six communes in the arrondissement have been uninhabited since the First World War.

== Composition ==
The communes of the arrondissement of Verdun, and their INSEE codes, are:

1. Abaucourt-Hautecourt (55002)
2. Aincreville (55004)
3. Ambly-sur-Meuse (55007)
4. Amel-sur-l'Étang (55008)
5. Ancemont (55009)
6. Arrancy-sur-Crusnes (55013)
7. Aubréville (55014)
8. Autréville-Saint-Lambert (55018)
9. Avillers-Sainte-Croix (55021)
10. Avioth (55022)
11. Avocourt (55023)
12. Azannes-et-Soumazannes (55024)
13. Baâlon (55025)
14. Bantheville (55028)
15. Baulny (55033)
16. Bazeilles-sur-Othain (55034)
17. Beauclair (55036)
18. Beaufort-en-Argonne (55037)
19. Beaumont-en-Verdunois (55039)
20. Belleray (55042)
21. Belleville-sur-Meuse (55043)
22. Belrupt-en-Verdunois (55045)
23. Béthelainville (55047)
24. Béthincourt (55048)
25. Bezonvaux (55050)
26. Billy-sous-Mangiennes (55053)
27. Blanzée (55055)
28. Boinville-en-Woëvre (55057)
29. Bonzée (55060)
30. Bouligny (55063)
31. Boureuilles (55065)
32. Brabant-en-Argonne (55068)
33. Brabant-sur-Meuse (55070)
34. Brandeville (55071)
35. Braquis (55072)
36. Bras-sur-Meuse (55073)
37. Bréhéville (55076)
38. Breux (55077)
39. Brieulles-sur-Meuse (55078)
40. Brocourt-en-Argonne (55082)
41. Brouennes (55083)
42. Buzy-Darmont (55094)
43. Cesse (55095)
44. Champneuville (55099)
45. Charny-sur-Meuse (55102)
46. Charpentry (55103)
47. Chattancourt (55106)
48. Chaumont-devant-Damvillers (55107)
49. Chauvency-Saint-Hubert (55110)
50. Chauvency-le-Château (55109)
51. Cheppy (55113)
52. Châtillon-sous-les-Côtes (55105)
53. Cierges-sous-Montfaucon (55115)
54. Le Claon (55116)
55. Clermont-en-Argonne (55117)
56. Cléry-le-Grand (55118)
57. Cléry-le-Petit (55119)
58. Combres-sous-les-Côtes (55121)
59. Consenvoye (55124)
60. Cuisy (55137)
61. Cumières-le-Mort-Homme (55139)
62. Cunel (55140)
63. Damloup (55143)
64. Damvillers (55145)
65. Dannevoux (55146)
66. Delut (55149)
67. Dieppe-sous-Douaumont (55153)
68. Dieue-sur-Meuse (55154)
69. Dombasle-en-Argonne (55155)
70. Dombras (55156)
71. Dommartin-la-Montagne (55157)
72. Dommary-Baroncourt (55158)
73. Domremy-la-Canne (55162)
74. Doncourt-aux-Templiers (55163)
75. Douaumont-Vaux (55537)
76. Doulcon (55165)
77. Dugny-sur-Meuse (55166)
78. Dun-sur-Meuse (55167)
79. Duzey (55168)
80. Écouviez (55169)
81. Écurey-en-Verdunois (55170)
82. Eix (55171)
83. Les Éparges (55172)
84. Épinonville (55174)
85. Esnes-en-Argonne (55180)
86. Étain (55181)
87. Éton (55182)
88. Étraye (55183)
89. Flassigny (55188)
90. Fleury-devant-Douaumont (55189)
91. Foameix-Ornel (55191)
92. Fontaines-Saint-Clair (55192)
93. Forges-sur-Meuse (55193)
94. Fresnes-en-Woëvre (55198)
95. Froidos (55199)
96. Fromeréville-les-Vallons (55200)
97. Fromezey (55201)
98. Futeau (55202)
99. Gercourt-et-Drillancourt (55206)
100. Gesnes-en-Argonne (55208)
101. Gincrey (55211)
102. Gouraincourt (55216)
103. Gremilly (55218)
104. Grimaucourt-en-Woëvre (55219)
105. Gussainville (55222)
106. Génicourt-sur-Meuse (55204)
107. Halles-sous-les-Côtes (55225)
108. Han-lès-Juvigny (55226)
109. Hannonville-sous-les-Côtes (55228)
110. Harville (55232)
111. Haudainville (55236)
112. Haudiomont (55237)
113. Haumont-près-Samogneux (55239)
114. Heippes (55241)
115. Hennemont (55242)
116. Herbeuville (55243)
117. Herméville-en-Woëvre (55244)
118. Les Islettes (55253)
119. Inor (55250)
120. Iré-le-Sec (55252)
121. Jametz (55255)
122. Jouy-en-Argonne (55257)
123. Julvécourt (55260)
124. Juvigny-sur-Loison (55262)
125. Labeuville (55265)
126. Lachalade (55266)
127. Lamouilly (55275)
128. Landrecourt-Lempire (55276)
129. Laneuville-sur-Meuse (55279)
130. Lanhères (55280)
131. Latour-en-Woëvre (55281)
132. Lemmes (55286)
133. Liny-devant-Dun (55292)
134. Lion-devant-Dun (55293)
135. Lissey (55297)
136. Loison (55299)
137. Louppy-sur-Loison (55306)
138. Louvemont-Côte-du-Poivre (55307)
139. Luzy-Saint-Martin (55310)
140. Maizeray (55311)
141. Malancourt (55313)
142. Mangiennes (55316)
143. Manheulles (55317)
144. Marchéville-en-Woëvre (55320)
145. Marre (55321)
146. Martincourt-sur-Meuse (55323)
147. Marville (55324)
148. Maucourt-sur-Orne (55325)
149. Merles-sur-Loison (55336)
150. Milly-sur-Bradon (55338)
151. Mogeville (55339)
152. Moirey-Flabas-Crépion (55341)
153. Mont-devant-Sassey (55345)
154. Montblainville (55343)
155. Montfaucon-d'Argonne (55346)
156. Les Monthairons (55347)
157. Montigny-devant-Sassey (55349)
158. Montmédy (55351)
159. Montzéville (55355)
160. Moranville (55356)
161. Morgemoulin (55357)
162. Mouilly (55360)
163. Moulainville (55361)
164. Moulins-Saint-Hubert (55362)
165. Moulotte (55363)
166. Mouzay (55364)
167. Murvaux (55365)
168. Muzeray (55367)
169. Nantillois (55375)
170. Nepvant (55377)
171. Le Neufour (55379)
172. Neuvilly-en-Argonne (55383)
173. Nixéville-Blercourt (55385)
174. Nouillonpont (55387)
175. Olizy-sur-Chiers (55391)
176. Ornes (55394)
177. Osches (55395)
178. Pareid (55399)
179. Parfondrupt (55400)
180. Peuvillers (55403)
181. Pillon (55405)
182. Pintheville (55406)
183. Pouilly-sur-Meuse (55408)
184. Quincy-Landzécourt (55410)
185. Rambluzin-et-Benoite-Vaux (55411)
186. Rarécourt (55416)
187. Récicourt (55419)
188. Récourt-le-Creux (55420)
189. Regnéville-sur-Meuse (55422)
190. Remoiville (55425)
191. Réville-aux-Bois (55428)
192. Riaville (55429)
193. Romagne-sous-Montfaucon (55438)
194. Romagne-sous-les-Côtes (55437)
195. Ronvaux (55439)
196. Rouvres-en-Woëvre (55443)
197. Rouvrois-sur-Othain (55445)
198. Rupt-en-Woëvre (55449)
199. Rupt-sur-Othain (55450)
200. Saint-André-en-Barrois (55453)
201. Saint-Hilaire-en-Woëvre (55457)
202. Saint-Jean-lès-Buzy (55458)
203. Saint-Laurent-sur-Othain (55461)
204. Saint-Pierrevillers (55464)
205. Saint-Remy-la-Calonne (55465)
206. Samogneux (55468)
207. Sassey-sur-Meuse (55469)
208. Saulmory-Villefranche (55471)
209. Saulx-lès-Champlon (55473)
210. Senon (55481)
211. Senoncourt-lès-Maujouy (55482)
212. Septsarges (55484)
213. Sivry-la-Perche (55489)
214. Sivry-sur-Meuse (55490)
215. Sommedieue (55492)
216. Sorbey (55495)
217. Les Souhesmes-Rampont (55497)
218. Souilly (55498)
219. Spincourt (55500)
220. Stenay (55502)
221. Thierville-sur-Meuse (55505)
222. Thillot (55507)
223. Thonne-la-Long (55508)
224. Thonne-le-Thil (55509)
225. Thonne-les-Près (55510)
226. Thonnelle (55511)
227. Tilly-sur-Meuse (55512)
228. Trésauvaux (55515)
229. Vacherauville (55523)
230. Vadelaincourt (55525)
231. Varennes-en-Argonne (55527)
232. Vaudoncourt (55535)
233. Vauquois (55536)
234. Velosnes (55544)
235. Verdun (55545)
236. Verneuil-Grand (55546)
237. Verneuil-Petit (55547)
238. Véry (55549)
239. Vigneul-sous-Montmédy (55552)
240. Ville-devant-Chaumont (55556)
241. Ville-en-Woëvre (55557)
242. Ville-sur-Cousances (55567)
243. Villers-devant-Dun (55561)
244. Villers-lès-Mangiennes (55563)
245. Villers-sous-Pareid (55565)
246. Villers-sur-Meuse (55566)
247. Villécloye (55554)
248. Vilosnes-Haraumont (55571)
249. Vittarville (55572)
250. Warcq (55578)
251. Watronville (55579)
252. Wavrille (55580)
253. Wiseppe (55582)
254. Woël (55583)

== History ==
The arrondissement of Verdun was created in 1800.

As a result of the reorganisation of the cantons of France which came into effect in 2015, the borders of the cantons are no longer related to the borders of the arrondissements. The cantons of the arrondissement of Verdun were, as of January 2015:

1. Charny-sur-Meuse
2. Clermont-en-Argonne
3. Damvillers
4. Dun-sur-Meuse
5. Étain
6. Fresnes-en-Woëvre
7. Montfaucon-d'Argonne
8. Montmédy
9. Souilly
10. Spincourt
11. Stenay
12. Varennes-en-Argonne
13. Verdun-Centre
14. Verdun-Est
15. Verdun-Ouest
