= Mont-devant-Sassey =

- Commune
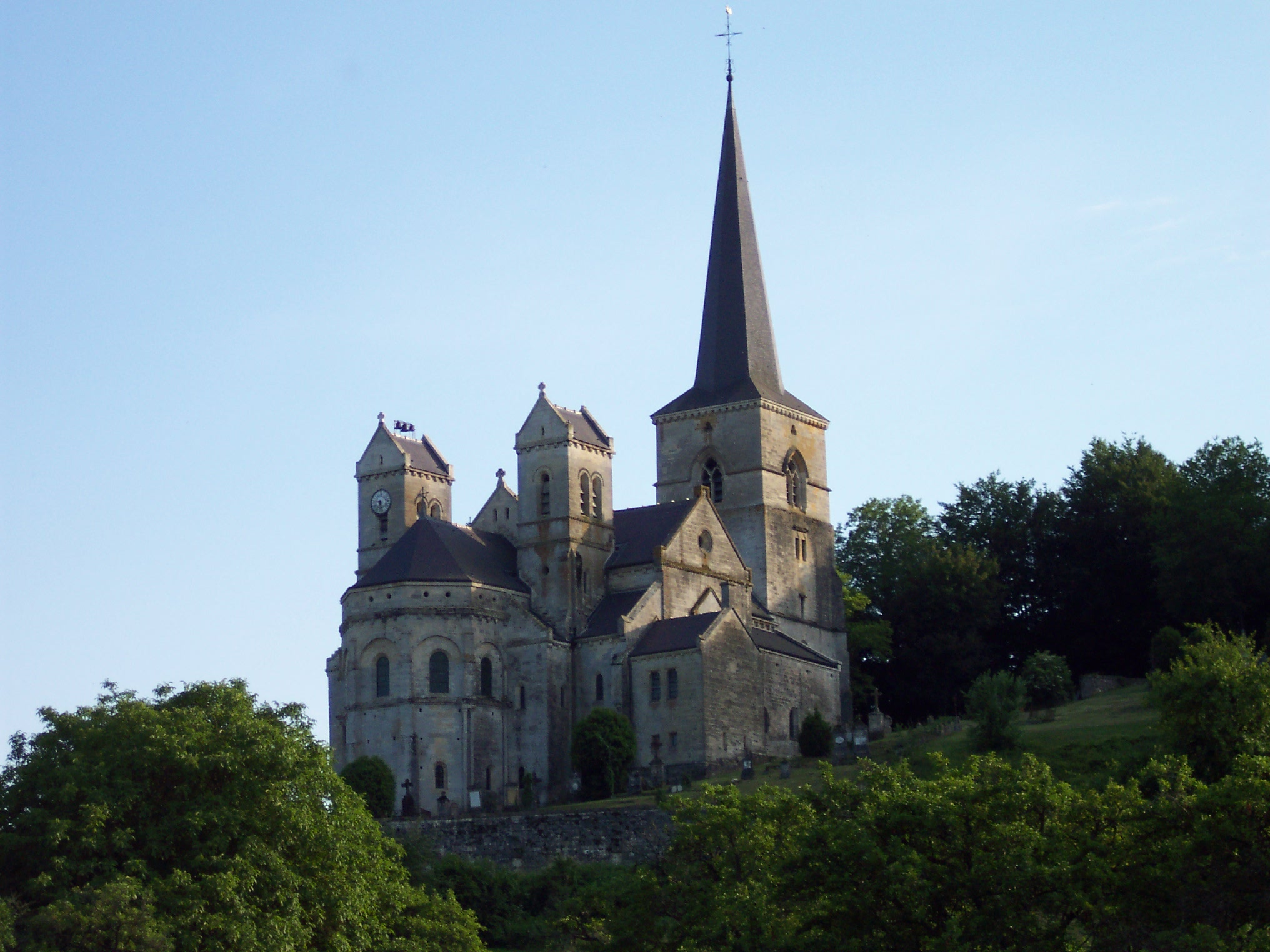
- Mont-devant-Sassey church

- Coat of arms
- Location of Mont-devant-Sassey
- Location within France Location within Grand Est
- Coordinates: 49°24′41″N 5°10′03″E
- Country: France
- Region: Grand Est
- Department: Meuse
- Arrondissement: Verdun
- Canton: Stenay
- Intercommunality: CC du Pays de Stenay et du Val Dunois

Government
  - Mayor (2020–2026): Olivier Martinez
- Area^{1}: 8.22 km^{2} (3.17 sq mi)
- Elevation: 310 m (1,020 ft)
- Highest elevation: 319 m (1,047 ft)
- Lowest elevation: 170 m (560 ft)
- Population (2023): 103
  - Density: 12.5/km^{2} (32.5/sq mi)
- Time zone: UTC+01:00 (CET)
  - Summer (DST): UTC+02:00 (CEST)
- INSEE/Postal code: 55345 /55110
- ^{1} French Land Register data, which excludes lakes, ponds, glaciers > 1 km^{2} (0.386 sq mi or 247 acres) and river estuaries.

Mont-devant-Sassey (French pronunciation: [mɔ̃ dəvɑ̃ sasɛ], literally Mont before Sassey) is a commune in the Meuse department in Grand Est in north-eastern France.

== See also ==
- Communes of the Meuse department
