= Brieulles-sur-Meuse =

- Commune
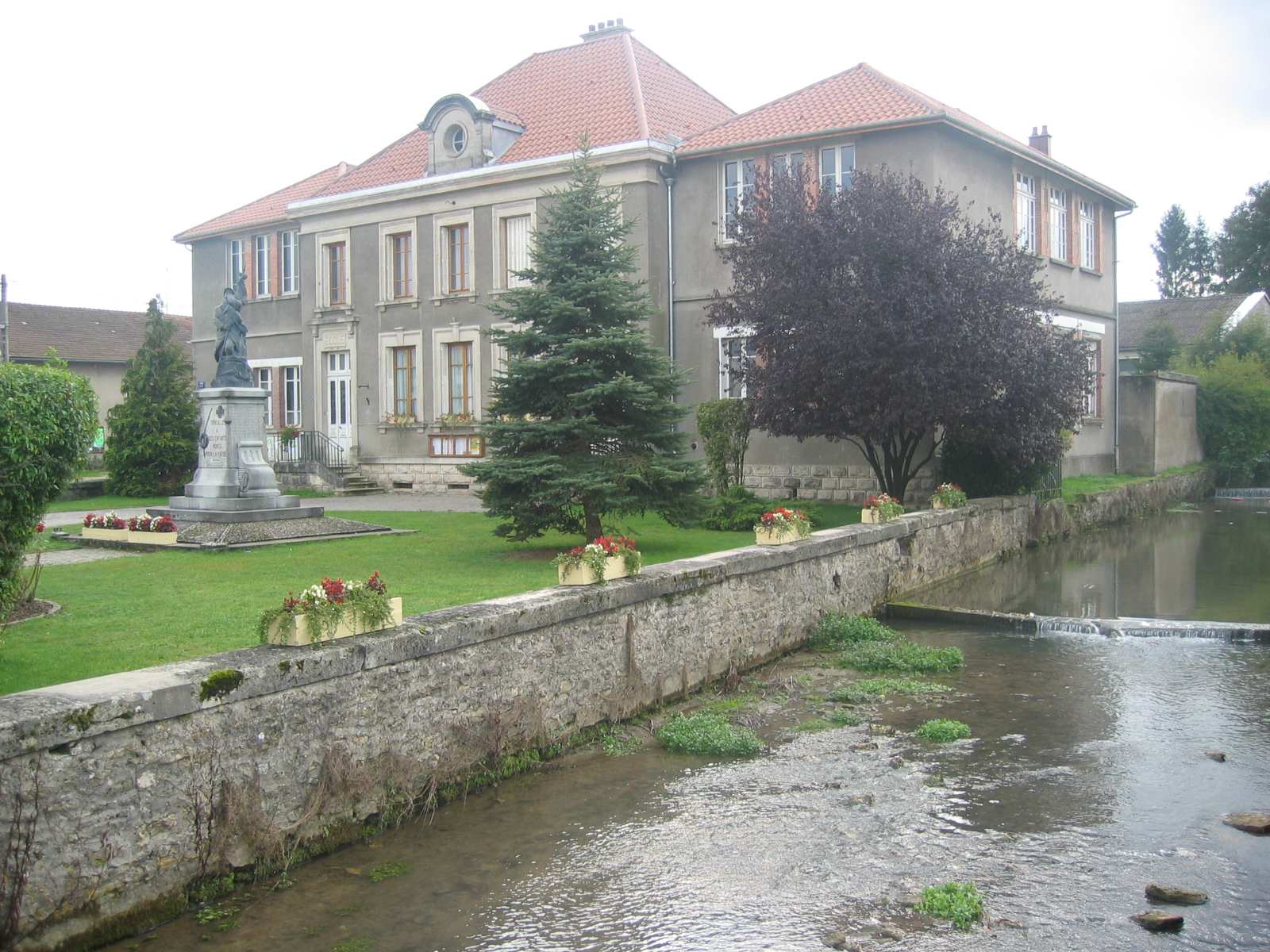
- Town hall

- Coat of arms
- Location of Brieulles-sur-Meuse
- Location within France Location within Grand Est
- Coordinates: 49°20′12″N 5°10′56″E
- Country: France
- Region: Grand Est
- Department: Meuse
- Arrondissement: Verdun
- Canton: Stenay
- Intercommunality: CC du Pays de Stenay et du Val Dunois

Government
  - Mayor (2020–2026): Éric Huard
- Area^{1}: 24.05 km^{2} (9.29 sq mi)
- Elevation: 178 m (584 ft)
- Highest elevation: 298 m (978 ft)
- Lowest elevation: 174 m (571 ft)
- Population (2023): 318
  - Density: 13.2/km^{2} (34.2/sq mi)
- Time zone: UTC+01:00 (CET)
  - Summer (DST): UTC+02:00 (CEST)
- INSEE/Postal code: 55078 /55110
- ^{1} French Land Register data, which excludes lakes, ponds, glaciers > 1 km^{2} (0.386 sq mi or 247 acres) and river estuaries.

Brieulles-sur-Meuse (French pronunciation: [bʁijœl syʁ møz], literally Brieulles on Meuse) is a commune in the Meuse department in Grand Est in northeastern France.

== Population ==
Historical population
Year	Pop.	±% p.a.
1968	482	—
1975	431	−1.58%
1982	391	−1.38%
1990	356	−1.17%
1999	322	−1.11%
2007	333	+0.42%
2012	339	+0.36%
2017	315	−1.46%
2023	318	+0.16%
Source: INSEE

== See also ==
- Communes of the Meuse department
