= 11th Field Artillery Regiment =

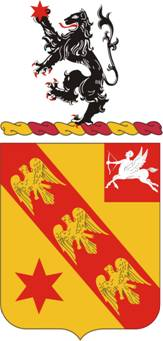
- Coat of arms
- Active: 1916
- Country: United States
- Branch: Army
- Type: Field artillery
- Motto: On Time

Insignia
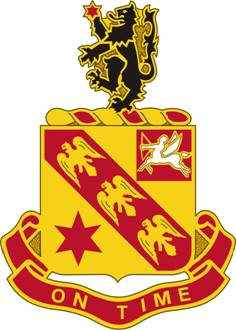
- Distinctive unit insignia

The 11th Field Artillery Regiment is a Field Artillery Branch regiment of the United States Army first formed in 1916. A parent regiment in the U.S. Army Regimental System, one battalion of the regiment is currently active, the 2nd Battalion, 11th Field Artillery Regiment assigned to the 2nd Brigade, 25th Infantry Division.

== History ==
The 11th Field Artillery Regiment was constituted on 3 June 1916 in the Regular Army at Camp Douglas.

Two months after the U.S. declaration of war following the sinking of RMS Lusitania, 10 officers and 200 enlisted men of the 6th Field Artillery were transferred to the newly formed 11th Field Artillery at Camp Harry J. Jones near Douglas, Arizona. These numbers were supplemented by draftees from New York, Ohio, Missouri, and California. At full wartime strength, the 11th had 63 officers, 1496 enlisted, and 24 guns.

In April 1918, the 11th was ordered to Fort Sill, where it became part of the 6th Field Artillery Brigade, 6th Division.

The regiment was shipped to England aboard RMS Carolina on 14 July 1918 and fought in the Meuse-Argonne Offensive, seeing its first action on the night of 26 October at Rémonville and participating in the largest artillery barrage of the war on 1 November. On 6 November, the guns of the 11th's Battery E were the first Allied artillery pieces to fire on the rail line between Metz and Sedan, and managed to silence a German battery some 3,000 yards (2.7 km) away.

For reasons unclear, Battery E, which had become separated from the rest of the regiment and was situated east of Beaufort, was accorded the honor of firing the final shot of World War I. The final shot, a 95-pound shell, was fired at 10:59:59 am on 11 November by a 155mm Schneider howitzer, at an unknown target (probably the Metz-Sedan railway).

Four battalions of the 11th Field Artillery Regiment served in the Vietnam War. The 1st Battalion served with the 9th Infantry Division. The 2d Battalion served with the 101st Airborne Division. The 6th Battalion served with the 11th Infantry Brigade. The 7th Battalion served the 25th Infantry Division. Robert Kalsu, one of two NFL players killed in Vietnam, served with Battery A, 2d Battalion in the 101st Airborne Division.

In 2025, 2nd Battalion began receiving M142 HIMARS multiple rocket launchers. From 15 April 2026 until 16 April 2026, the 2nd Battalion forward deployed the M142 HIMARS in the Philippines for first time.

== Lineage ==
- Constituted 1 July 1916 in the Regular Army as the 11th Field Artillery.
- Organized 1 June 1917 at Douglas Arizona.
- Assigned in November 1917 to 6th Division.
- Relieved 12 November 1920 from assignment to the 6th Division.
- Assigned 1 March to the Hawaiian Division (later designated the 24th Infantry Division).
- Relieved 31 March 1958 from assignment to the 24th Infantry Division.
- 2nd Battalion, 11th Field Artillery, currently assigned to the 25th Infantry Division (Light).

== Distinctive unit insignia ==
=== Description ===
A gold color metal and enamel device 1 1/4 inches (3.2 cm) in height overall consisting of a shield blazoned: Or, on a bend Gules, three alerions of the field, in dexter base a six-pointed mullet of the second. On a sinister canton of the like a winged centaur courant with bow and arrow Argent. Above the shield on the wreath Or and Gules, a lion rampant Sable, grasping in his dexter paw a six-pointed mullet Gules. Attached below and to the sides of the shield a Red scroll inscribed “ON TIME” in Gold letters.

=== Symbolism ===
The 11th Field Artillery was formed by the transfer of personnel from the 6th Field Artillery and served in France in the 6th Division, its battle service being in the province of Lorraine. The arms of Lorraine have three alerions on the red band, the field being gold. To this is added the insignia of the 6th Division and, on a canton, the crest of the 6th Field Artillery. The crest is a black lion rampant taken from the arms of Stenay in commemoration of the principal action of the Regiment, which was in support of the 89th Division during the crossing of the Meuse near Stenay. The insignia of the 6th Division is in the lion's paw.

=== Background ===
The distinctive unit insignia was originally approved for the 11th Field Artillery Regiment on 7 November 1922. It was amended to correct the description on 7 December 1923. It was re-designated for the 11th Field Artillery Battalion on 11 July 1942. The insignia was re-designated for the 11th Artillery Regiment on 13 August 1958. It was amended to correct and clarify the background history and significance of the design as given in the description of the original approval on 10 March 1959. The insignia was re-designated effective 1 September 1971, for the 11th Field Artillery Regiment.

== Current configuration ==
- 1st Battalion 11th Field Artillery Regiment (United States)
- 2nd Battalion 11th Field Artillery Regiment
- 3rd Battalion 11th Field Artillery Regiment
- 4th Battalion 11th Field Artillery Regiment
- 5th Battalion 11th Field Artillery Regiment
