= Villers-devant-Dun =

- Commune
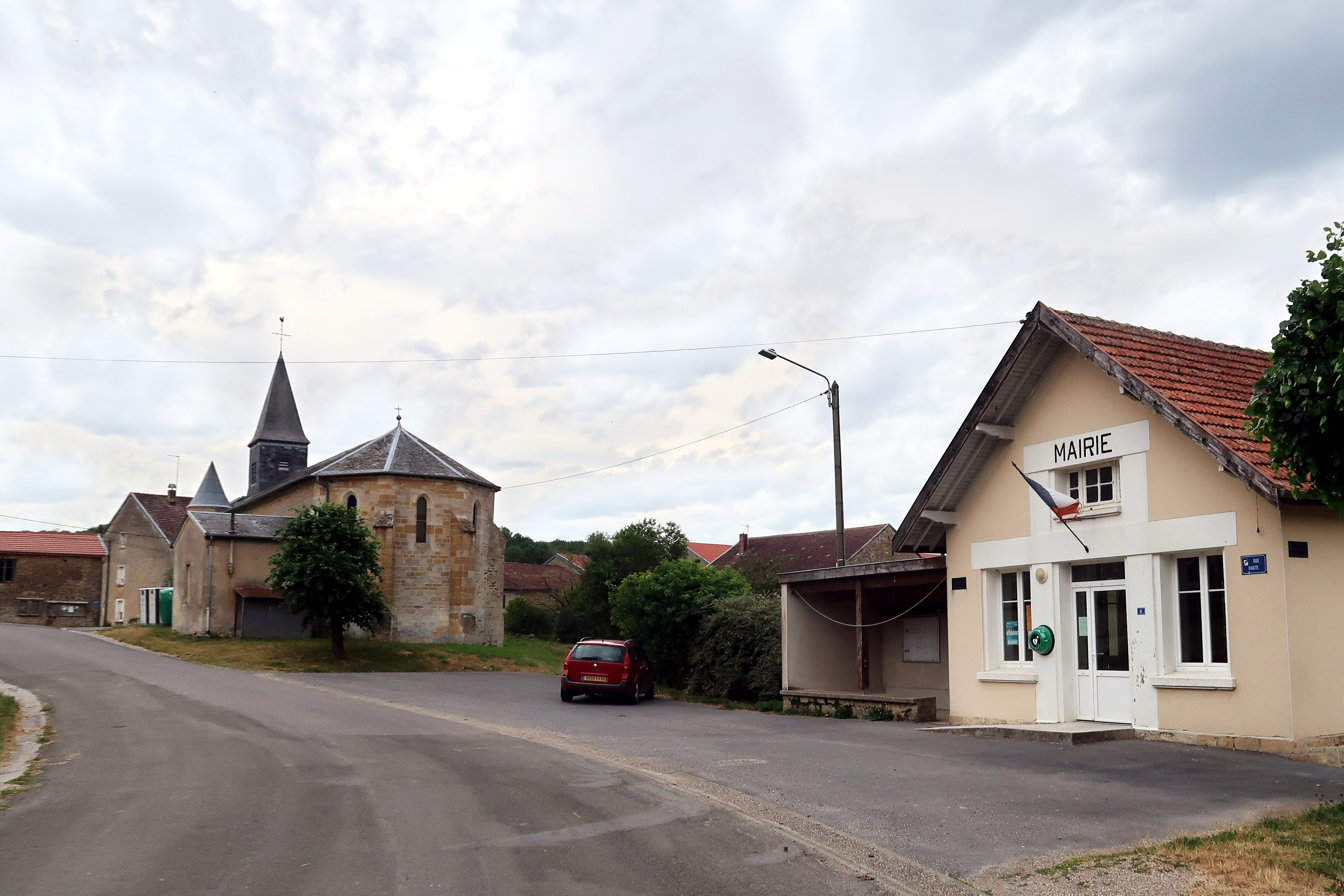
- Town hall

- Coat of arms
- Location of Villers-devant-Dun
- Location within France Location within Grand Est
- Coordinates: 49°23′49″N 5°06′41″E
- Country: France
- Region: Grand Est
- Department: Meuse
- Arrondissement: Verdun
- Canton: Stenay
- Intercommunality: CC du Pays de Stenay et du Val Dunois

Government
  - Mayor (2020–2026): Vanessa Pierson
- Area^{1}: 7.97 km^{2} (3.08 sq mi)
- Elevation: 316 m (1,037 ft)
- Highest elevation: 340 m (1,120 ft)
- Lowest elevation: 233 m (764 ft)
- Population (2023): 52
  - Density: 6.5/km^{2} (17/sq mi)
- Time zone: UTC+01:00 (CET)
  - Summer (DST): UTC+02:00 (CEST)
- INSEE/Postal code: 55561 /55110
- ^{1} French Land Register data, which excludes lakes, ponds, glaciers > 1 km^{2} (0.386 sq mi or 247 acres) and river estuaries.

Villers-devant-Dun is a commune in the Meuse department in Grand Est in north-eastern France.

== See also ==
- Communes of the Meuse department
