= Beauclair =

- Commune
- Location of Beauclair
- Location within France Location within Grand Est
- Coordinates: 49°27′31″N 5°06′56″E
- Country: France
- Region: Grand Est
- Department: Meuse
- Arrondissement: Verdun
- Canton: Stenay

Government
  - Mayor (2020–2026): François Watrin
- Area^{1}: 4.84 km^{2} (1.87 sq mi)
- Elevation: 190 m (620 ft)
- Highest elevation: 308 m (1,010 ft)
- Lowest elevation: 174 m (571 ft)
- Population (2023): 86
  - Density: 18/km^{2} (46/sq mi)
- Time zone: UTC+01:00 (CET)
  - Summer (DST): UTC+02:00 (CEST)
- INSEE/Postal code: 55036 /55700
- ^{1} French Land Register data, which excludes lakes, ponds, glaciers > 1 km^{2} (0.386 sq mi or 247 acres) and river estuaries.

Beauclair (French pronunciation: [boklɛʁ]) is a commune in the Meuse department in the Grand Est region in northeastern France.

== Population ==
Historical population
Year	Pop.	±% p.a.
1968	94	—
1975	75	−3.17%
1982	72	−0.58%
1990	84	+1.95%
1999	85	+0.13%
2007	85	+0.00%
2012	88	+0.70%
2017	90	+0.45%
2023	86	−0.75%
Source: INSEE

== See also ==
- Communes of the Meuse department
