= Halles-sous-les-Côtes =

- Commune
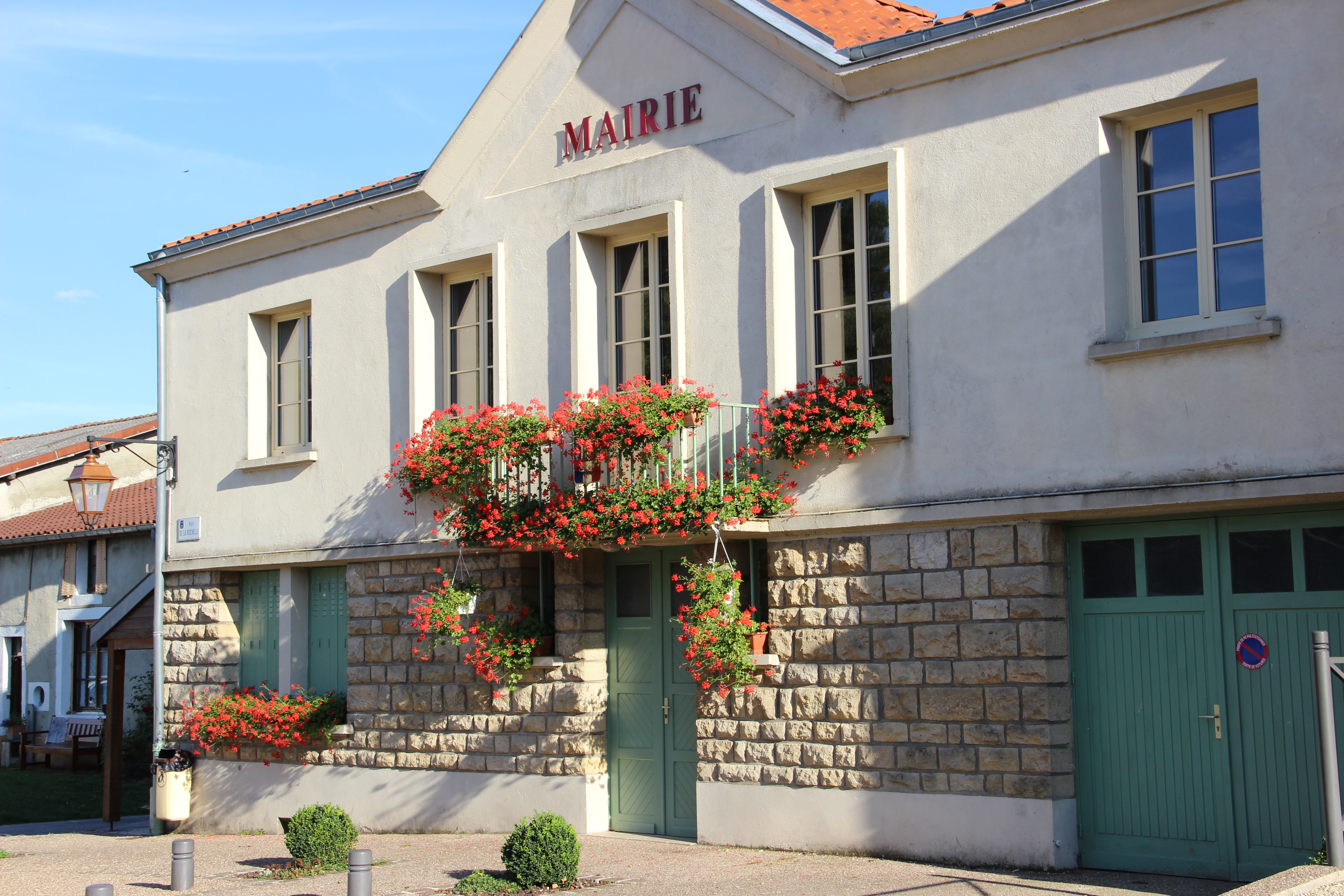
- The town hall in Halles-sous-les-Côtes
- Location of Halles-sous-les-Côtes
- Location within France Location within Grand Est
- Coordinates: 49°27′00″N 5°07′17″E
- Country: France
- Region: Grand Est
- Department: Meuse
- Arrondissement: Verdun
- Canton: Stenay
- Intercommunality: CC du Pays de Stenay et du Val Dunois

Government
  - Mayor (2020–2026): Martin Quiring
- Area^{1}: 5.51 km^{2} (2.13 sq mi)
- Elevation: 200 m (660 ft)
- Highest elevation: 317 m (1,040 ft)
- Lowest elevation: 174 m (571 ft)
- Population (2023): 138
  - Density: 25.0/km^{2} (64.9/sq mi)
- Time zone: UTC+01:00 (CET)
  - Summer (DST): UTC+02:00 (CEST)
- INSEE/Postal code: 55225 /55700
- ^{1} French Land Register data, which excludes lakes, ponds, glaciers > 1 km^{2} (0.386 sq mi or 247 acres) and river estuaries.

Halles-sous-les-Côtes (French pronunciation: [al su le kot]) is a commune in the Meuse department in Grand Est in north-eastern France.

== See also ==
- Communes of the Meuse department
