= Liny-devant-Dun =

- Commune
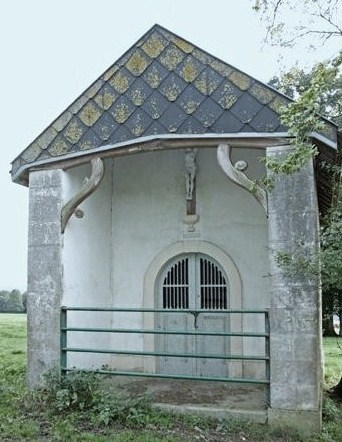
- The chapel of Saint-Lié in Liny-devant-Dun

- Coat of arms
- Location of Liny-devant-Dun
- Location within France Location within Grand Est
- Coordinates: 49°21′21″N 5°11′55″E
- Country: France
- Region: Grand Est
- Department: Meuse
- Arrondissement: Verdun
- Canton: Stenay
- Intercommunality: CC du Pays de Stenay et du Val Dunois

Government
  - Mayor (2020–2026): Alain Reuter
- Area^{1}: 10.9 km^{2} (4.2 sq mi)
- Elevation: 280 m (920 ft)
- Highest elevation: 282 m (925 ft)
- Lowest elevation: 172 m (564 ft)
- Population (2023): 185
  - Density: 17.0/km^{2} (44.0/sq mi)
- Time zone: UTC+01:00 (CET)
  - Summer (DST): UTC+02:00 (CEST)
- INSEE/Postal code: 55292 /55110
- ^{1} French Land Register data, which excludes lakes, ponds, glaciers > 1 km^{2} (0.386 sq mi or 247 acres) and river estuaries.

Liny-devant-Dun (French pronunciation: [lini dəvɑ̃ dœ̃], literally Liny before Dun) is a commune in the Meuse department in Grand Est in north-eastern France.

== See also ==
- Communes of the Meuse department
