= Lamouilly =

- Commune
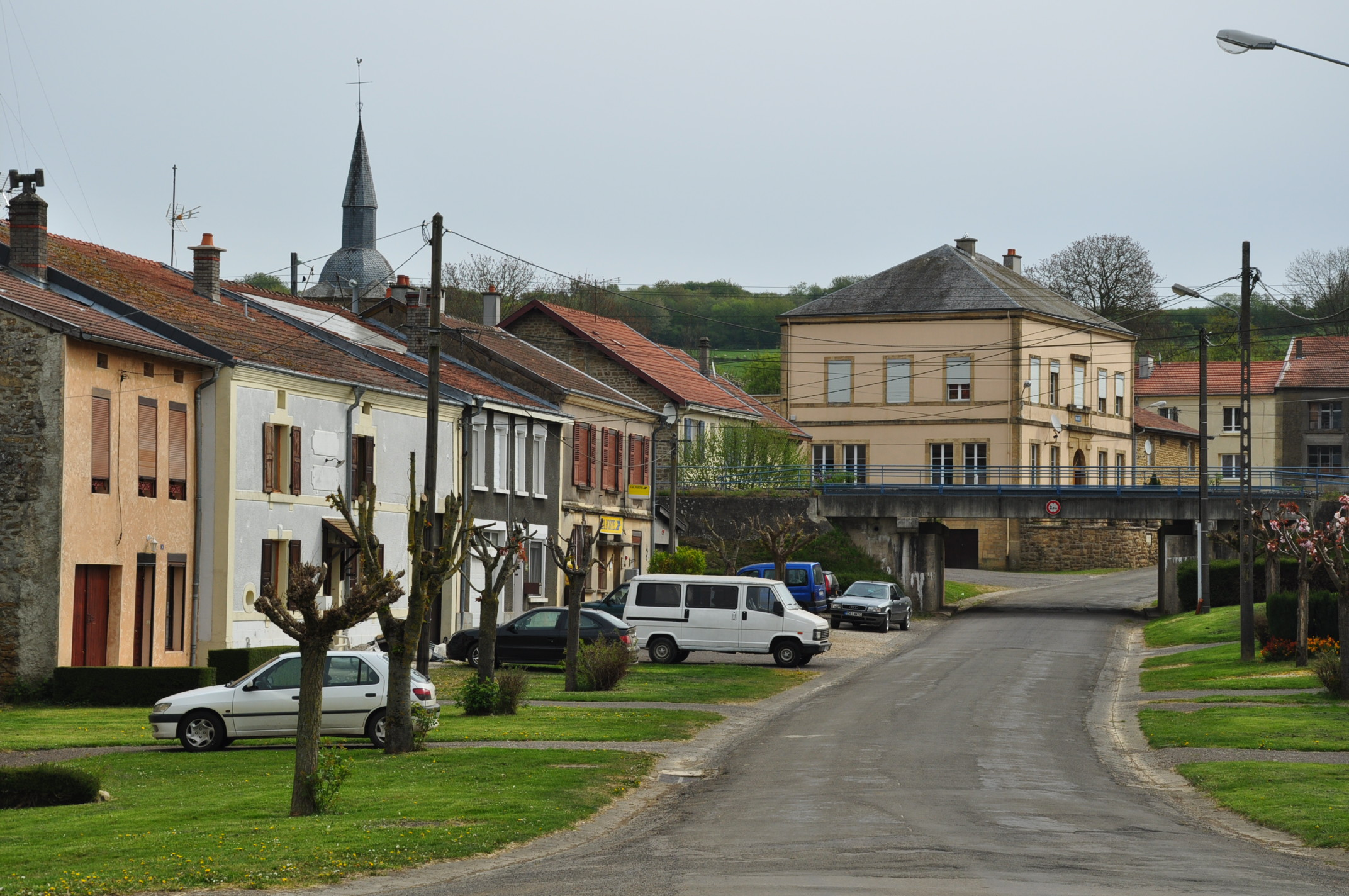
- A view within Lamouilly
- Location of Lamouilly
- Location within France Location within Grand Est
- Coordinates: 49°32′54″N 5°14′06″E
- Country: France
- Region: Grand Est
- Department: Meuse
- Arrondissement: Verdun
- Canton: Stenay
- Intercommunality: CC du Pays de Stenay et du Val Dunois

Government
  - Mayor (2020–2026): Nelly Aubry
- Area^{1}: 4.76 km^{2} (1.84 sq mi)
- Elevation: 193 m (633 ft)
- Highest elevation: 281 m (922 ft)
- Lowest elevation: 167 m (548 ft)
- Population (2023): 84
  - Density: 18/km^{2} (46/sq mi)
- Time zone: UTC+01:00 (CET)
  - Summer (DST): UTC+02:00 (CEST)
- INSEE/Postal code: 55275 /55700
- ^{1} French Land Register data, which excludes lakes, ponds, glaciers > 1 km^{2} (0.386 sq mi or 247 acres) and river estuaries.

Lamouilly (French pronunciation: [lamuji]) is a commune in the Meuse department in Grand Est in north-eastern France.

== See also ==
- Communes of the Meuse department
