= Lion-devant-Dun =

- Commune
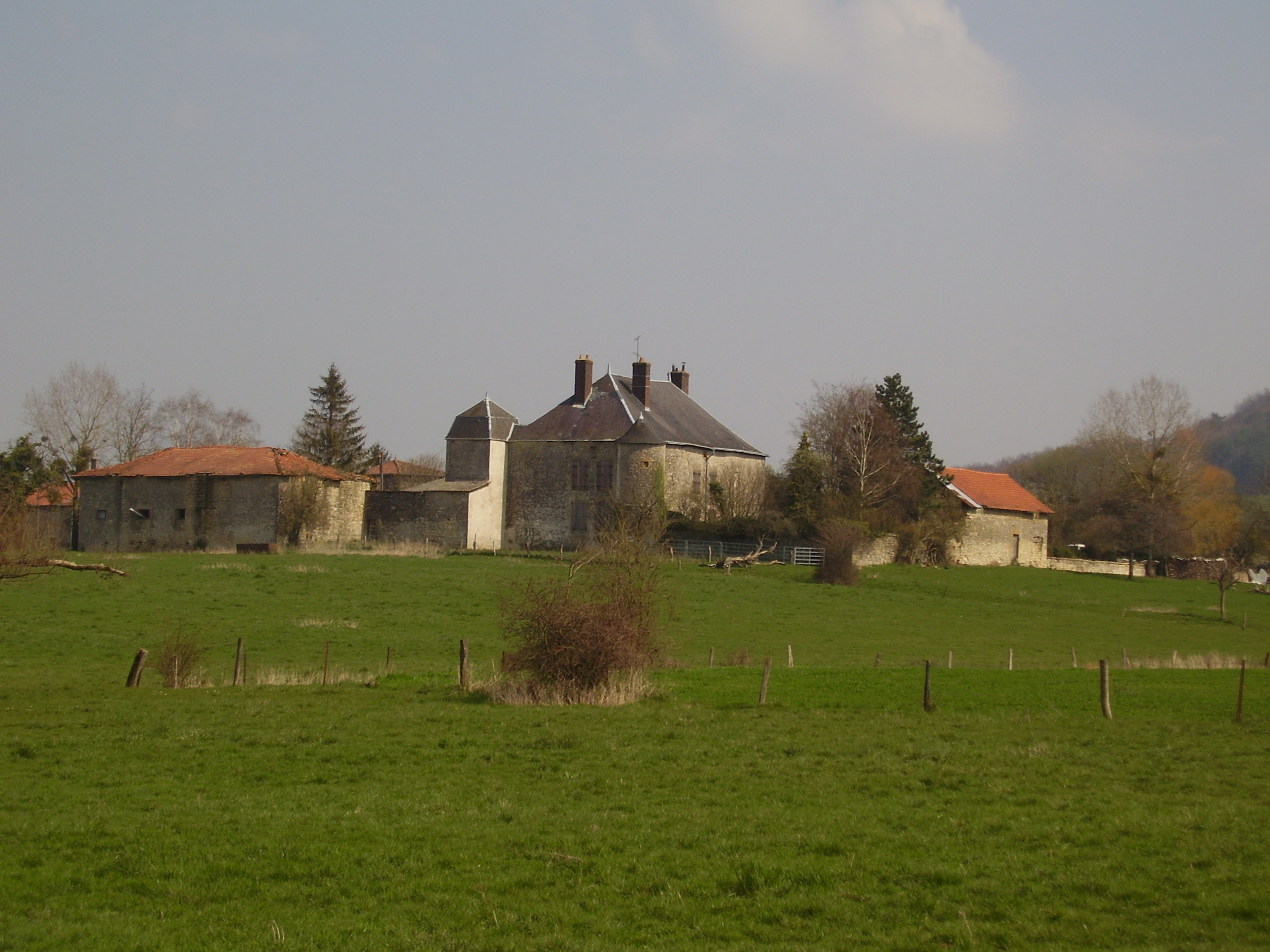
- The chateau in Lion-devant-Dun

- Coat of arms
- Location of Lion-devant-Dun
- Location within France Location within Grand Est
- Coordinates: 49°24′41″N 5°13′49″E
- Country: France
- Region: Grand Est
- Department: Meuse
- Arrondissement: Verdun
- Canton: Stenay
- Intercommunality: CC du Pays de Stenay et du Val Dunois

Government
  - Mayor (2020–2026): Daniel Windels
- Area^{1}: 15.51 km^{2} (5.99 sq mi)
- Elevation: 179 m (587 ft)
- Highest elevation: 340 m (1,120 ft)
- Lowest elevation: 171 m (561 ft)
- Population (2023): 181
  - Density: 11.7/km^{2} (30.2/sq mi)
- Time zone: UTC+01:00 (CET)
  - Summer (DST): UTC+02:00 (CEST)
- INSEE/Postal code: 55293 /55110
- ^{1} French Land Register data, which excludes lakes, ponds, glaciers > 1 km^{2} (0.386 sq mi or 247 acres) and river estuaries.

Lion-devant-Dun (French pronunciation: [ljɔ̃ dəvɑ̃ dœ̃], literally Lion before Dun) is a commune in the Meuse department in Grand Est in north-eastern France.

== See also ==
- Communes of the Meuse department
