= Brouennes =

- Commune
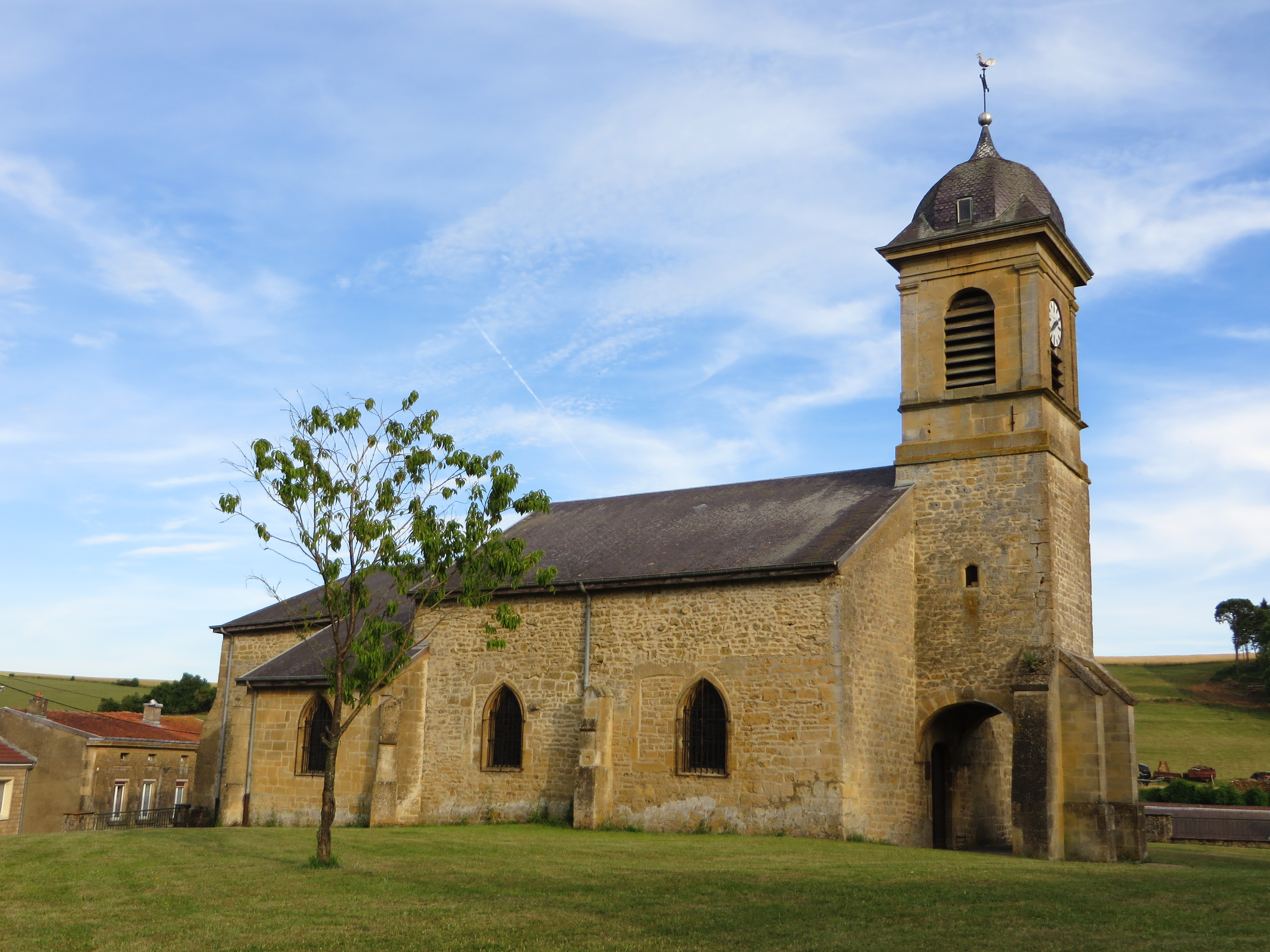
- The church in Brouennes

- Coat of arms
- Location of Brouennes
- Location within France Location within Grand Est
- Coordinates: 49°31′05″N 5°15′36″E
- Country: France
- Region: Grand Est
- Department: Meuse
- Arrondissement: Verdun
- Canton: Stenay
- Intercommunality: CC du Pays de Stenay et du Val Dunois

Government
  - Mayor (2020–2026): Bernard Kazuk
- Area^{1}: 12.22 km^{2} (4.72 sq mi)
- Elevation: 200 m (660 ft)
- Highest elevation: 296 m (971 ft)
- Lowest elevation: 167 m (548 ft)
- Population (2023): 149
  - Density: 12.2/km^{2} (31.6/sq mi)
- Time zone: UTC+01:00 (CET)
  - Summer (DST): UTC+02:00 (CEST)
- INSEE/Postal code: 55083 /55700
- ^{1} French Land Register data, which excludes lakes, ponds, glaciers > 1 km^{2} (0.386 sq mi or 247 acres) and river estuaries.

Brouennes (French pronunciation: [bʁu.ɛn]) is a commune in the Meuse department in Grand Est in northeastern France.

== Population ==
Historical population
Year	Pop.	±% p.a.
1968	167	—
1975	155	−1.06%
1982	148	−0.66%
1990	160	+0.98%
1999	145	−1.09%
2007	169	+1.93%
2012	154	−1.84%
2017	150	−0.52%
2023	149	−0.11%
Source: INSEE

== See also ==
- Communes of the Meuse department
