= Luzy-Saint-Martin =

- Commune
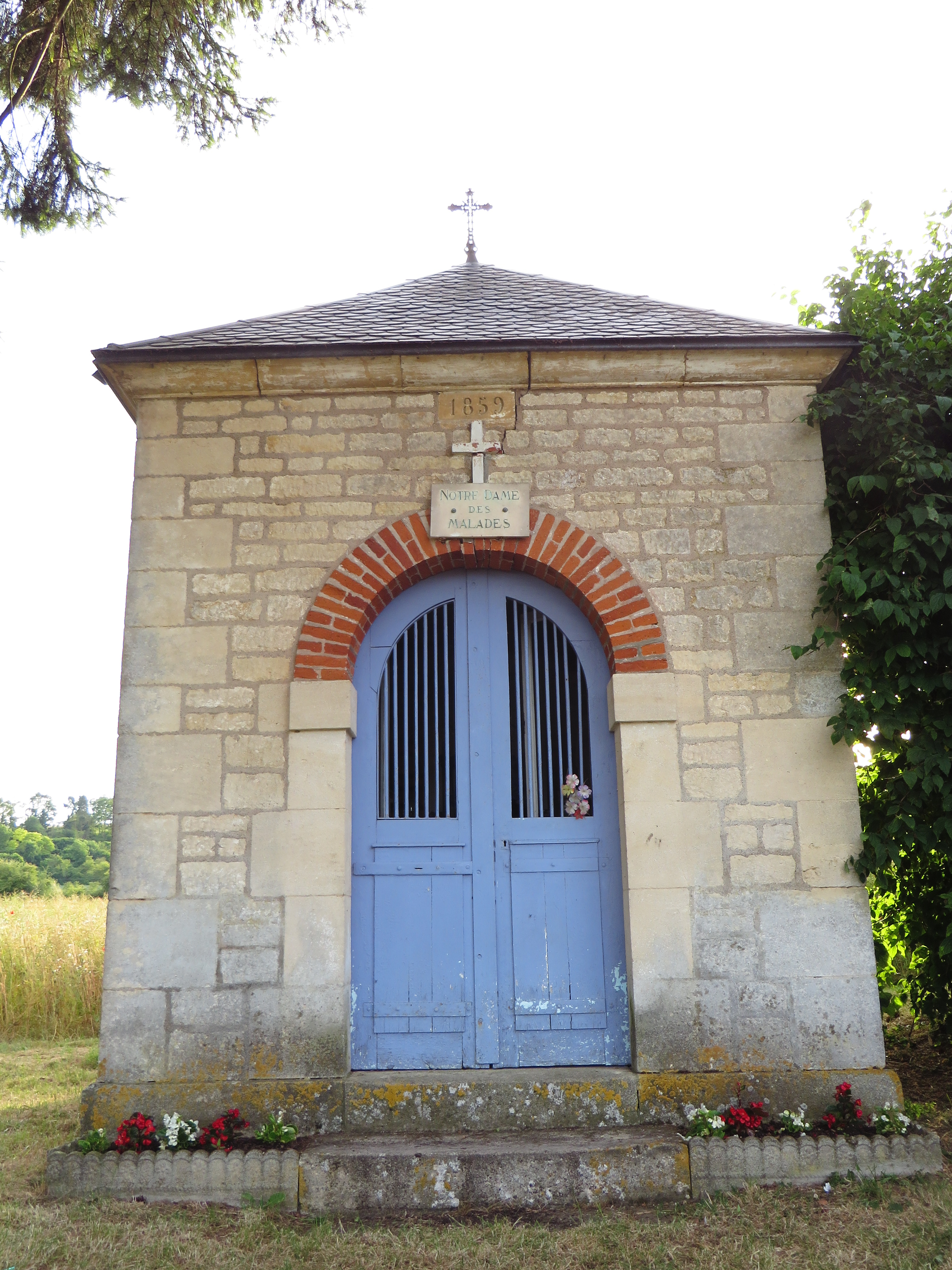
- The chapel of Notre-Dame-des malades in Luzy-Saint-Martin
- Location of Luzy-Saint-Martin
- Location within France Location within Grand Est
- Coordinates: 49°31′28″N 5°09′26″E
- Country: France
- Region: Grand Est
- Department: Meuse
- Arrondissement: Verdun
- Canton: Stenay
- Intercommunality: CC du Pays de Stenay et du Val Dunois

Government
  - Mayor (2020–2026): Daniel Dupuis
- Area^{1}: 7.35 km^{2} (2.84 sq mi)
- Elevation: 165 m (541 ft)
- Highest elevation: 276 m (906 ft)
- Lowest elevation: 161 m (528 ft)
- Population (2023): 115
  - Density: 15.6/km^{2} (40.5/sq mi)
- Time zone: UTC+01:00 (CET)
  - Summer (DST): UTC+02:00 (CEST)
- INSEE/Postal code: 55310 /55700
- ^{1} French Land Register data, which excludes lakes, ponds, glaciers > 1 km^{2} (0.386 sq mi or 247 acres) and river estuaries.

Luzy-Saint-Martin (French pronunciation: [lyzi sɛ̃ maʁtɛ̃]) is a commune in the Meuse department in Grand Est in north-eastern France.

== See also ==
- Communes of the Meuse department
