= Moulins-Saint-Hubert =

- Commune
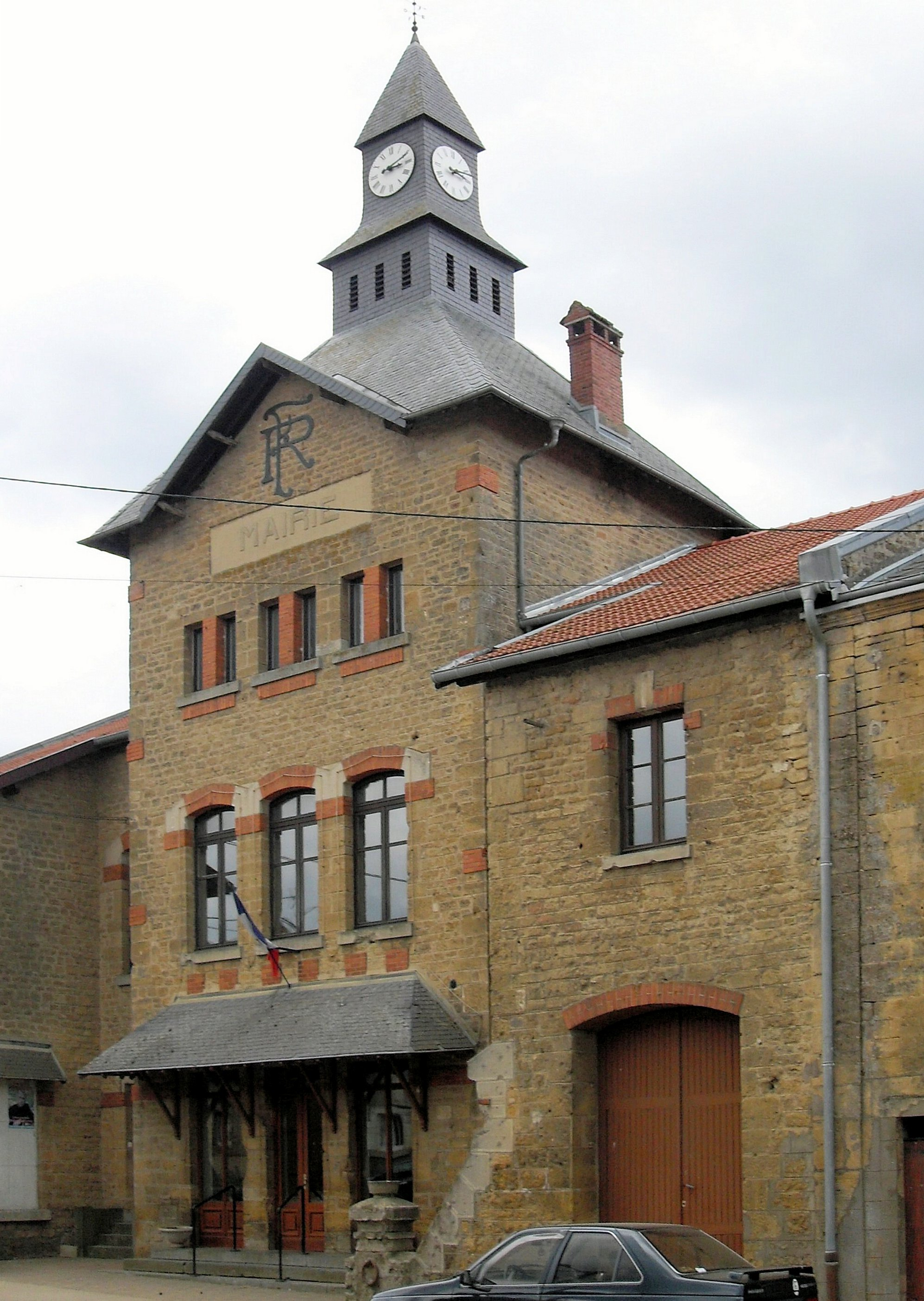
- The town hall in Moulins-Saint-Hubert
- Location of Moulins-Saint-Hubert
- Location within France Location within Grand Est
- Coordinates: 49°34′44″N 5°07′34″E
- Country: France
- Region: Grand Est
- Department: Meuse
- Arrondissement: Verdun
- Canton: Stenay
- Intercommunality: CC du Pays de Stenay et du Val Dunois

Government
  - Mayor (2020–2026): Jean-Jacques Gérard
- Area^{1}: 8.43 km^{2} (3.25 sq mi)
- Elevation: 199 m (653 ft)
- Highest elevation: 316 m (1,037 ft)
- Lowest elevation: 172 m (564 ft)
- Population (2023): 175
  - Density: 20.8/km^{2} (53.8/sq mi)
- Time zone: UTC+01:00 (CET)
  - Summer (DST): UTC+02:00 (CEST)
- INSEE/Postal code: 55362 /55700
- ^{1} French Land Register data, which excludes lakes, ponds, glaciers > 1 km^{2} (0.386 sq mi or 247 acres) and river estuaries.

Moulins-Saint-Hubert (French pronunciation: [mulɛ̃ sɛ̃.t‿ybɛʁ]) is a commune in the Meuse department in Grand Est in north-eastern France.

== See also ==
- Communes of the Meuse department
