= Olizy-sur-Chiers =

- Commune
- Location of Olizy-sur-Chiers
- Location within France Location within Grand Est
- Coordinates: 49°33′N 5°13′E
- Country: France
- Region: Grand Est
- Department: Meuse
- Arrondissement: Verdun
- Canton: Stenay
- Intercommunality: CC du Pays de Stenay et du Val Dunois

Government
  - Mayor (2020–2026): Gérard Georges
- Area^{1}: 9.22 km^{2} (3.56 sq mi)
- Elevation: 190 m (620 ft)
- Highest elevation: 342 m (1,122 ft)
- Lowest elevation: 166 m (545 ft)
- Population (2023): 188
  - Density: 20.4/km^{2} (52.8/sq mi)
- Time zone: UTC+01:00 (CET)
  - Summer (DST): UTC+02:00 (CEST)
- INSEE/Postal code: 55391 /55700
- ^{1} French Land Register data, which excludes lakes, ponds, glaciers > 1 km^{2} (0.386 sq mi or 247 acres) and river estuaries.

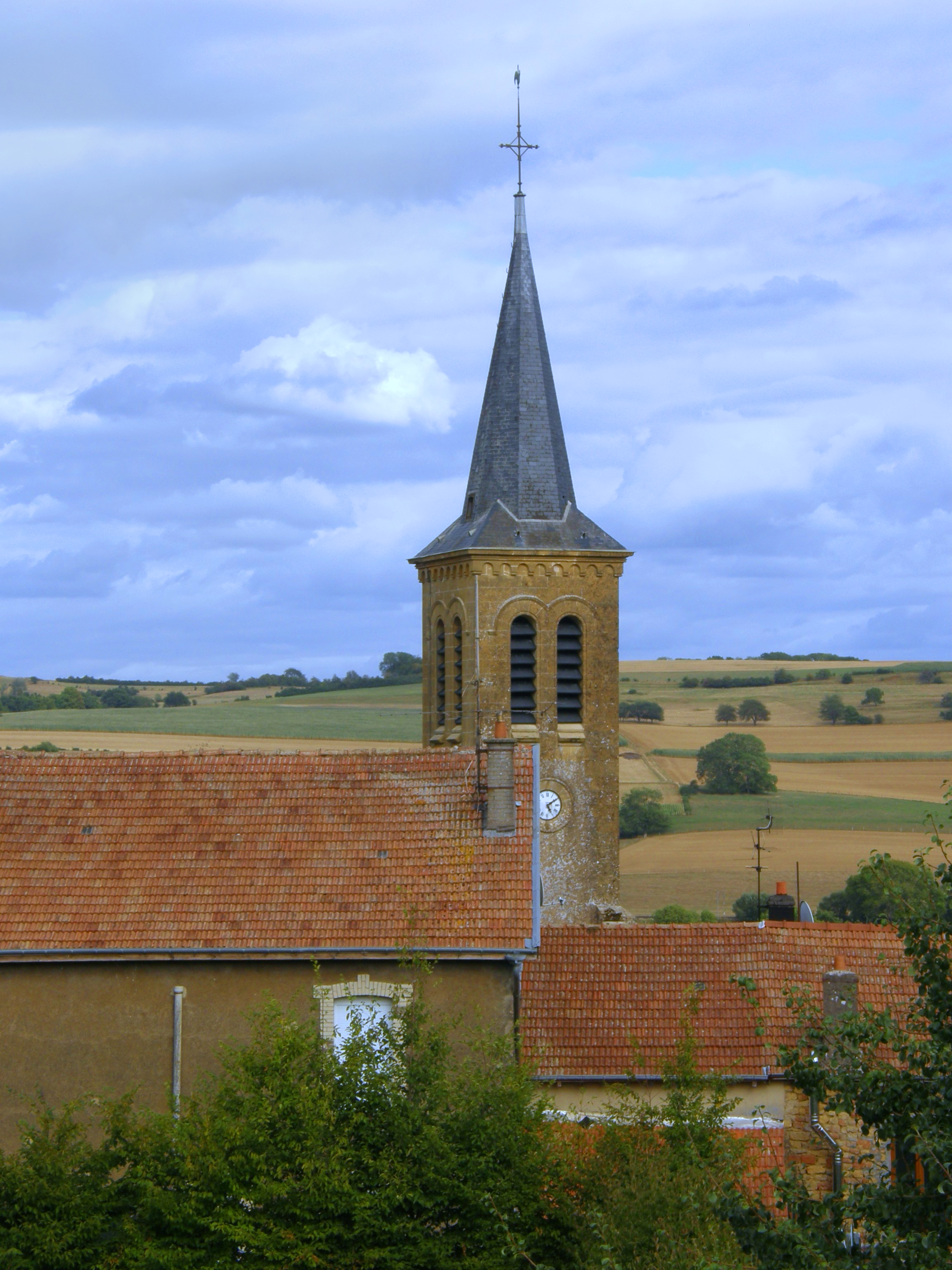
Olizy-sur-Chiers

Olizy-sur-Chiers (French pronunciation: [ɔlizi syʁ ʃjɛʁ], literally Olizy on Chiers) is a commune in the Meuse department in Grand Est in north-eastern France.

== See also ==
- Communes of the Meuse department
