= Wiseppe =

- Commune
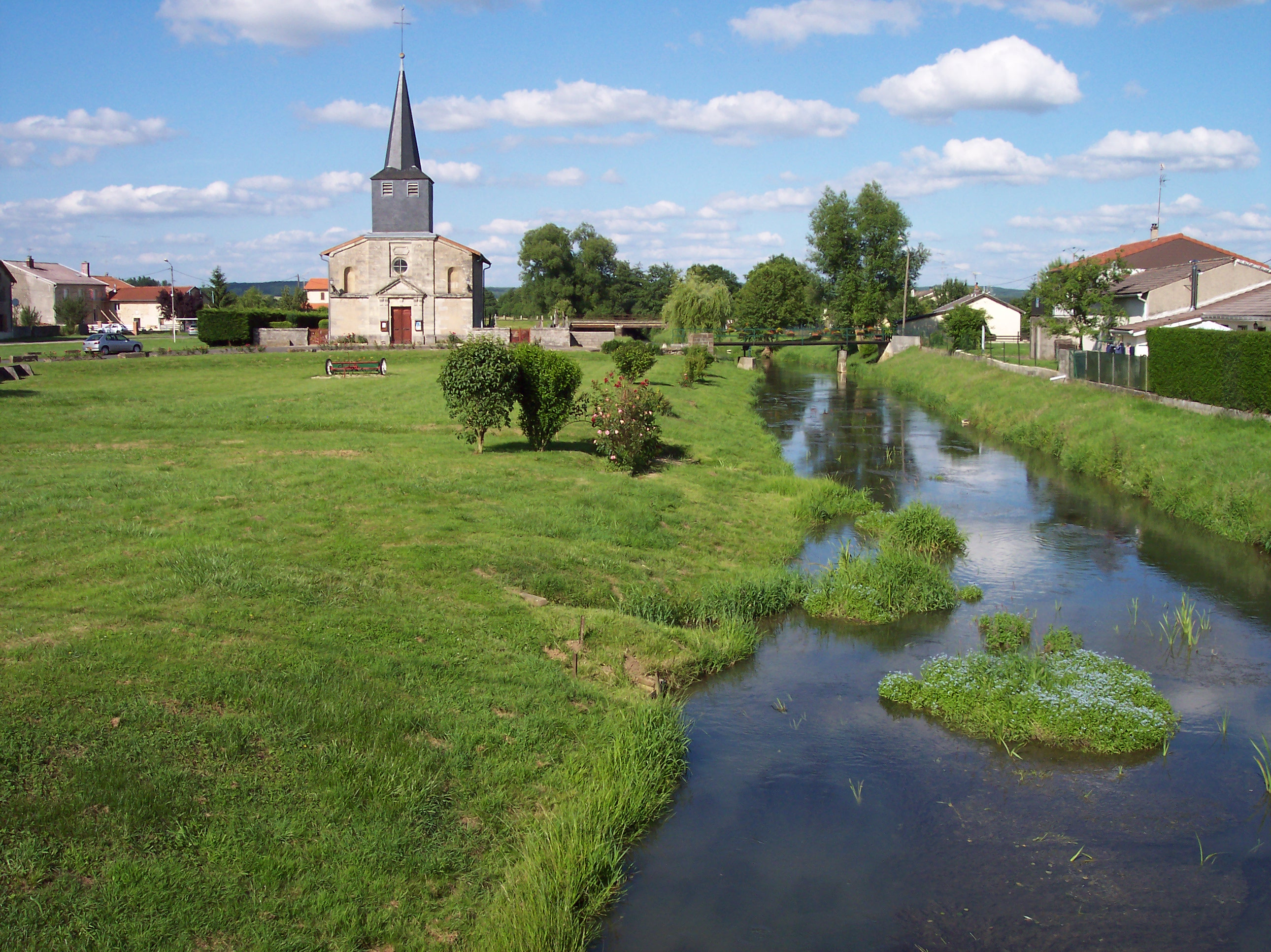
- Church beside the River Wiseppe at Wiseppe
- Location of Wiseppe
- Location within France Location within Grand Est
- Coordinates: 49°27′27″N 5°10′26″E
- Country: France
- Region: Grand Est
- Department: Meuse
- Arrondissement: Verdun
- Canton: Stenay
- Intercommunality: Pays de Stenay et du Val Dunois

Government
  - Mayor (2020–2026): Yves Javelot
- Area^{1}: 5.69 km^{2} (2.20 sq mi)
- Elevation: 170 m (560 ft)
- Highest elevation: 208 m (682 ft)
- Lowest elevation: 166 m (545 ft)
- Population (2023): 96
  - Density: 17/km^{2} (44/sq mi)
- Time zone: UTC+01:00 (CET)
  - Summer (DST): UTC+02:00 (CEST)
- INSEE/Postal code: 55582 /55700
- ^{1} French Land Register data, which excludes lakes, ponds, glaciers > 1 km^{2} (0.386 sq mi or 247 acres) and river estuaries.

Wiseppe is a commune in the Meuse department in Grand Est in north-eastern France.

== Population ==
Historical population
Year	Pop.	±% p.a.
1968	147	—
1975	120	−2.86%
1982	121	+0.12%
1990	104	−1.87%
1999	97	−0.77%
2007	112	+1.81%
2012	111	−0.18%
2017	97	−2.66%
2023	96	−0.17%
Source: INSEE

== See also ==
- Communes of the Meuse department
