= Fontaines-Saint-Clair =

- Commune
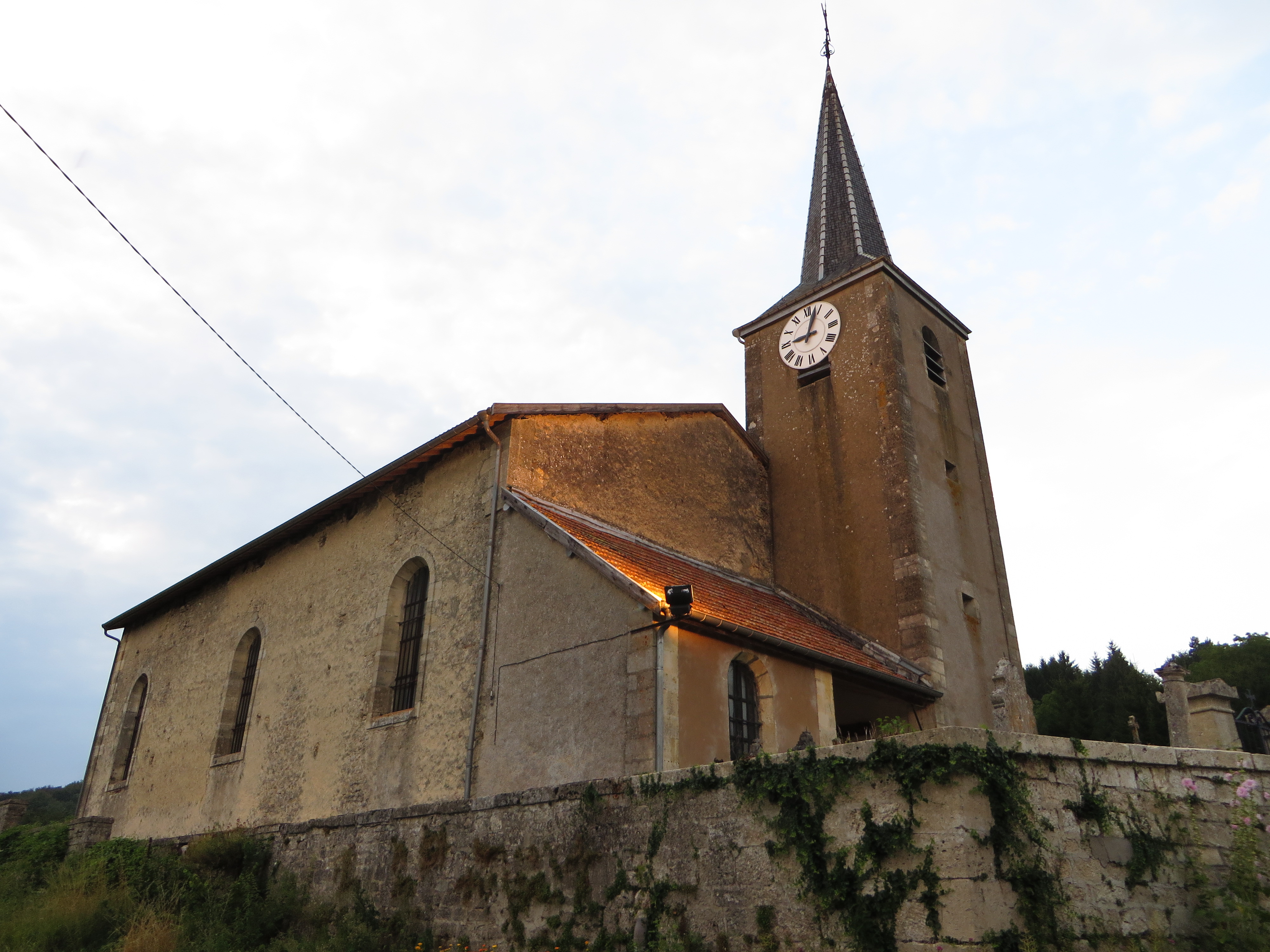
- The church in Fontaines-Saint-Clair
- Location of Fontaines-Saint-Clair
- Location within France Location within Grand Est
- Coordinates: 49°22′11″N 5°14′11″E
- Country: France
- Region: Grand Est
- Department: Meuse
- Arrondissement: Verdun
- Canton: Stenay
- Intercommunality: CC du Pays de Stenay et du Val Dunois

Government
  - Mayor (2020–2026): Jean Broyart
- Area^{1}: 6.23 km^{2} (2.41 sq mi)
- Elevation: 216 m (709 ft)
- Highest elevation: 343 m (1,125 ft)
- Lowest elevation: 195 m (640 ft)
- Population (2023): 35
  - Density: 5.6/km^{2} (15/sq mi)
- Time zone: UTC+01:00 (CET)
  - Summer (DST): UTC+02:00 (CEST)
- INSEE/Postal code: 55192 /55110
- ^{1} French Land Register data, which excludes lakes, ponds, glaciers > 1 km^{2} (0.386 sq mi or 247 acres) and river estuaries.

Fontaines-Saint-Clair (French pronunciation: [fɔ̃tɛn sɛ̃ klɛːʁ]) is a commune in the Meuse department in Grand Est in north-eastern France.

== See also ==
- Communes of the Meuse department
