= Cesse =

- Commune
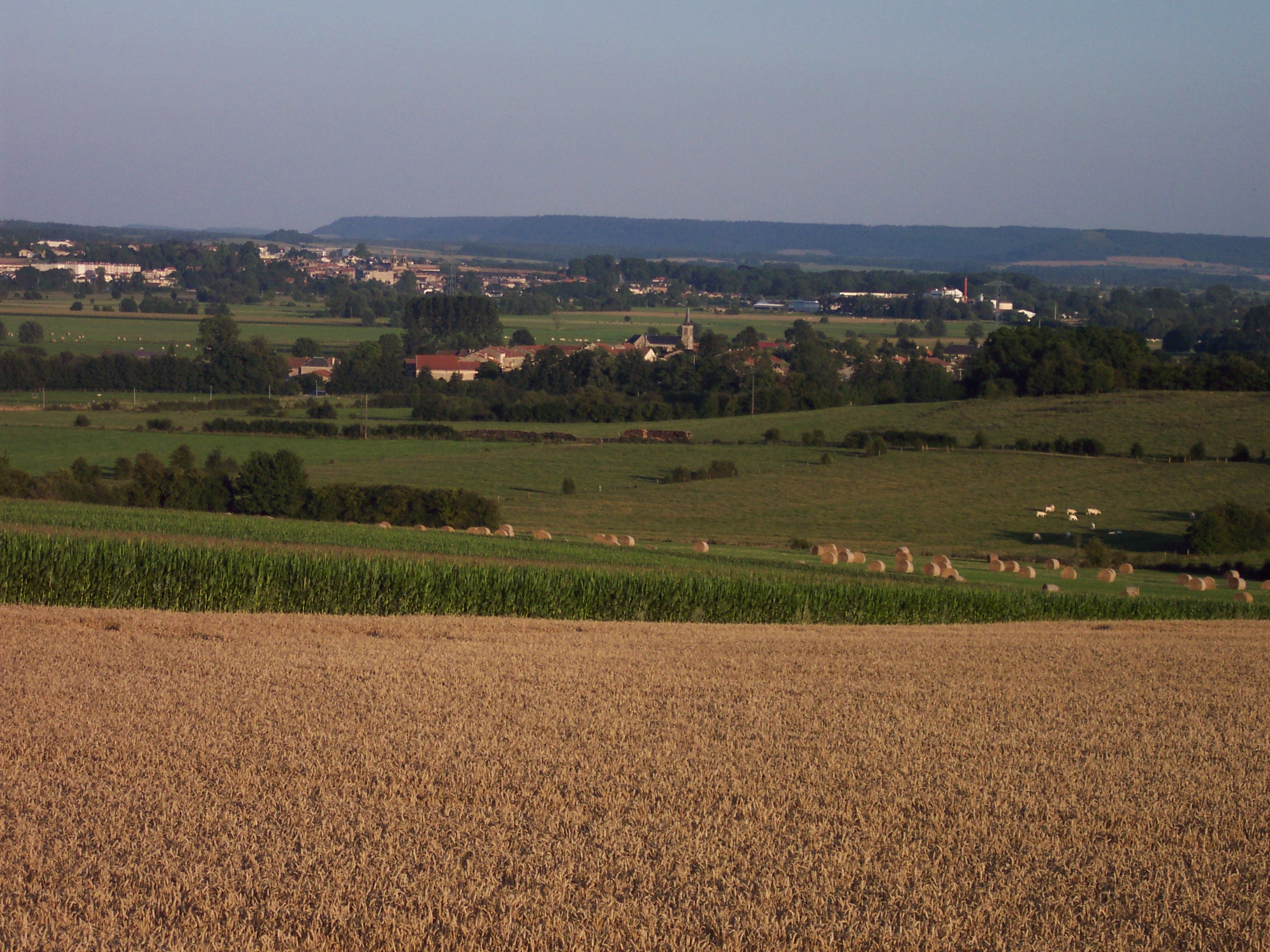
- A view of the village of Cesse seen from Luzy-Saint-Martin
- Location of Cesse
- Location within France Location within Grand Est
- Coordinates: 49°30′46″N 5°09′31″E
- Country: France
- Region: Grand Est
- Department: Meuse
- Arrondissement: Verdun
- Canton: Stenay
- Intercommunality: CC du Pays de Stenay et du Val Dunois

Government
  - Mayor (2020–2026): Daniel Dumay
- Area^{1}: 5.3 km^{2} (2.0 sq mi)
- Elevation: 169 m (554 ft)
- Highest elevation: 217 m (712 ft)
- Lowest elevation: 163 m (535 ft)
- Population (2023): 119
  - Density: 22/km^{2} (58/sq mi)
- Time zone: UTC+01:00 (CET)
  - Summer (DST): UTC+02:00 (CEST)
- INSEE/Postal code: 55095 /55700
- ^{1} French Land Register data, which excludes lakes, ponds, glaciers > 1 km^{2} (0.386 sq mi or 247 acres) and river estuaries.

Cesse (French pronunciation: [sɛs]) is a commune in the Meuse department in Grand Est in north-eastern France.

== See also ==
- Communes of the Meuse department
