= Cléry-le-Grand =

- Commune
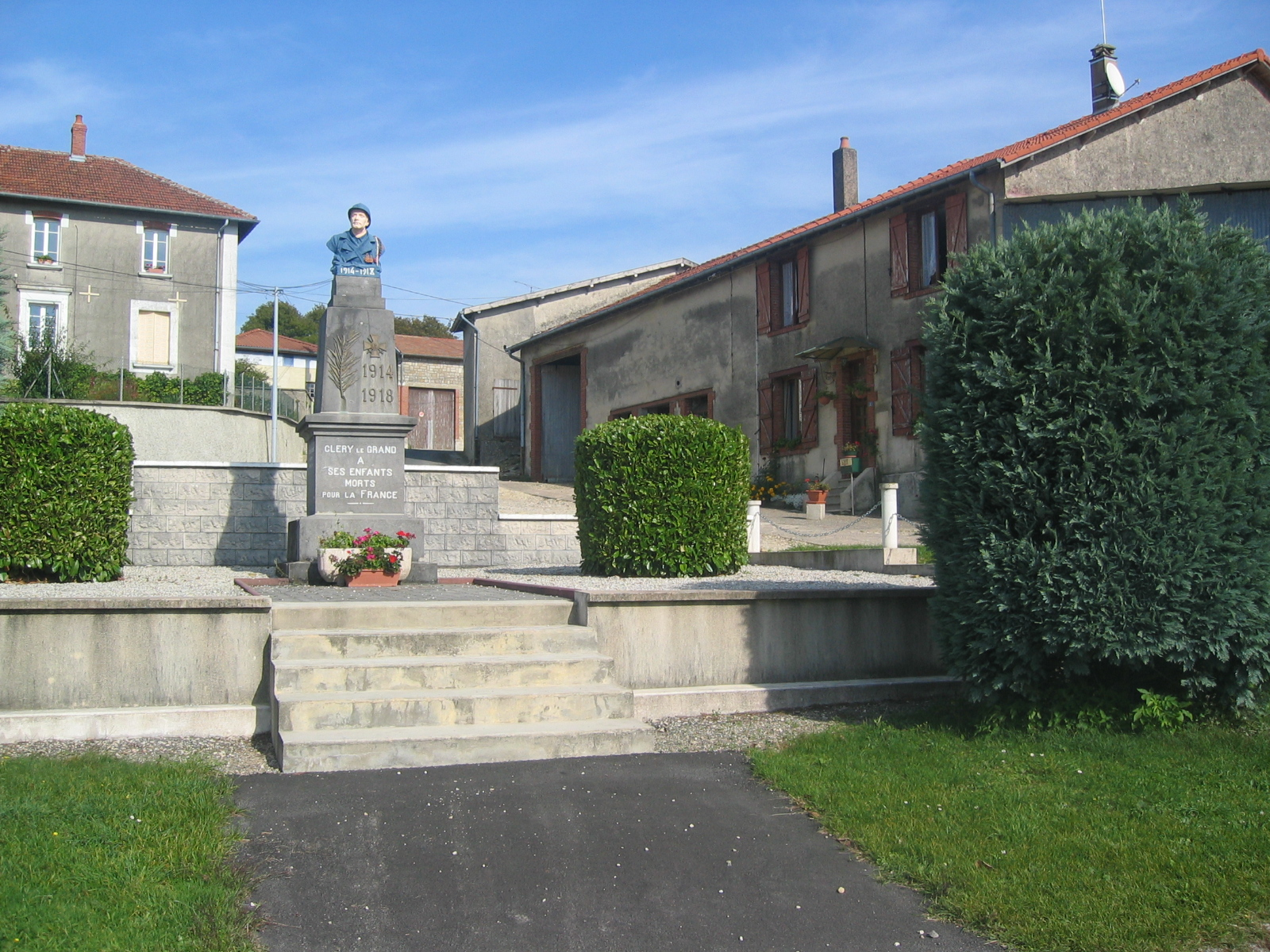
- The war memorial in Cléry-le-Grand

- Coat of arms
- Location of Cléry-le-Grand
- Location within France Location within Grand Est
- Coordinates: 49°21′51″N 5°09′23″E
- Country: France
- Region: Grand Est
- Department: Meuse
- Arrondissement: Verdun
- Canton: Stenay
- Intercommunality: CC du Pays de Stenay et du Val Dunois

Government
  - Mayor (2020–2026): Philippe Chardin
- Area^{1}: 7.18 km^{2} (2.77 sq mi)
- Highest elevation: 298 m (978 ft)
- Lowest elevation: 179 m (587 ft)
- Population (2023): 88
  - Density: 12/km^{2} (32/sq mi)
- Time zone: UTC+01:00 (CET)
  - Summer (DST): UTC+02:00 (CEST)
- INSEE/Postal code: 55118 /55110
- ^{1} French Land Register data, which excludes lakes, ponds, glaciers > 1 km^{2} (0.386 sq mi or 247 acres) and river estuaries.

Cléry-le-Grand (French pronunciation: [kleʁi lə ɡʁɑ̃]) is a commune in the Meuse department in Grand Est in north-eastern France.

== See also ==
- Communes of the Meuse department
