= Milly-sur-Bradon =

- Commune
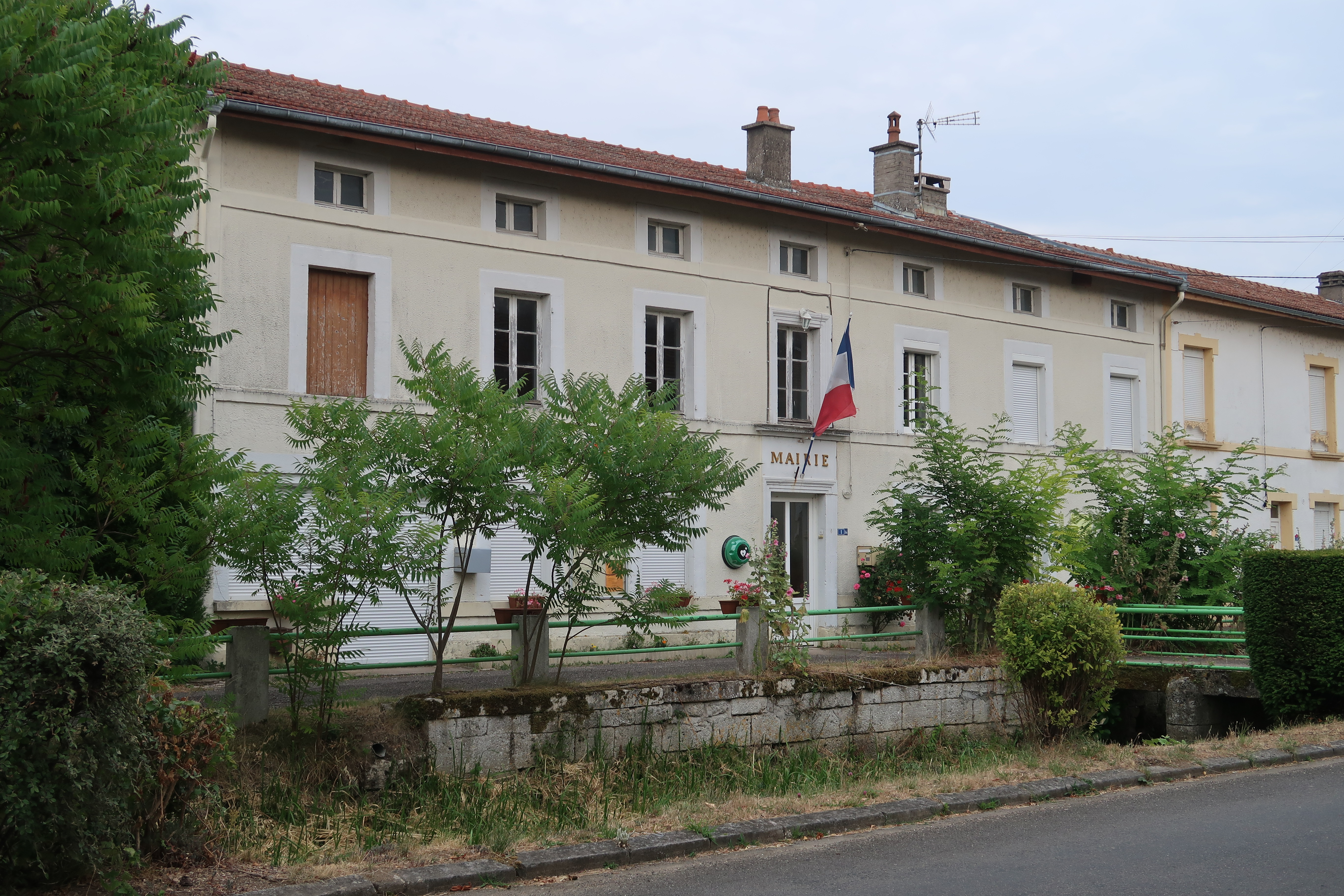
- Milly-sur-Bradon Town Hall

- Coat of arms
- Location of Milly-sur-Bradon
- Location within France Location within Grand Est
- Coordinates: 49°23′54″N 5°12′28″E
- Country: France
- Region: Grand Est
- Department: Meuse
- Arrondissement: Verdun
- Canton: Stenay
- Intercommunality: CC du Pays de Stenay et du Val Dunois

Government
  - Mayor (2020–2026): Gilles Doury
- Area^{1}: 10.4 km^{2} (4.0 sq mi)
- Elevation: 115 m (377 ft)
- Highest elevation: 338 m (1,109 ft)
- Lowest elevation: 169 m (554 ft)
- Population (2023): 148
  - Density: 14.2/km^{2} (36.9/sq mi)
- Time zone: UTC+01:00 (CET)
  - Summer (DST): UTC+02:00 (CEST)
- INSEE/Postal code: 55338 /55110
- ^{1} French Land Register data, which excludes lakes, ponds, glaciers > 1 km^{2} (0.386 sq mi or 247 acres) and river estuaries.

Milly-sur-Bradon is a commune in the Meuse department in Grand Est in north-eastern France.

== See also ==
- Communes of the Meuse department
