= Laneuville-sur-Meuse =

- Commune
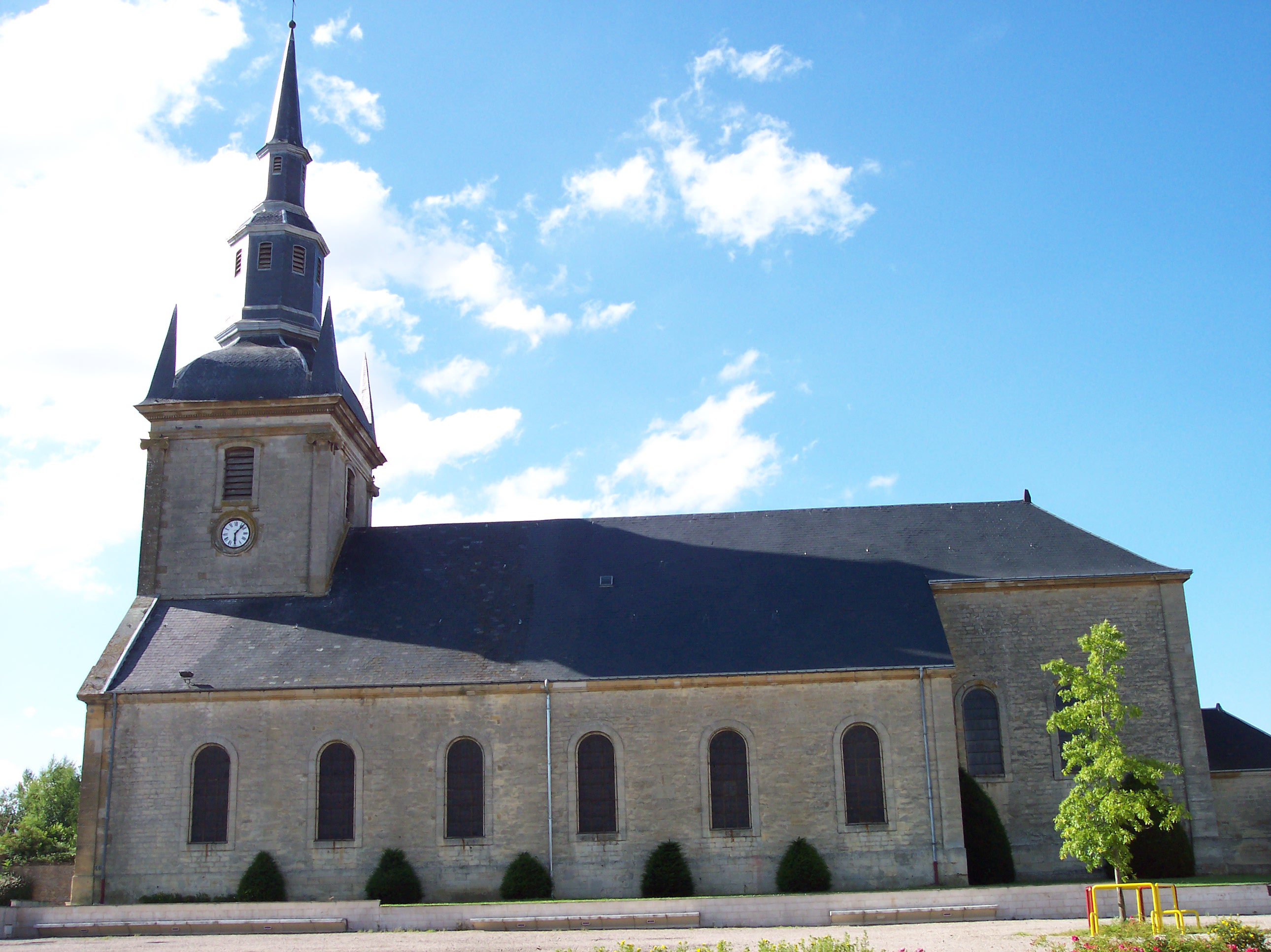
- The church in Laneuville-sur-Meuse
- Location of Laneuville-sur-Meuse
- Location within France Location within Grand Est
- Coordinates: 49°29′32″N 5°09′54″E
- Country: France
- Region: Grand Est
- Department: Meuse
- Arrondissement: Verdun
- Canton: Stenay
- Intercommunality: CC du Pays de Stenay et du Val Dunois

Government
  - Mayor (2020–2026): Cédric Pierson
- Area^{1}: 22.82 km^{2} (8.81 sq mi)
- Elevation: 171 m (561 ft)
- Highest elevation: 246 m (807 ft)
- Lowest elevation: 162 m (531 ft)
- Population (2023): 432
  - Density: 18.9/km^{2} (49.0/sq mi)
- Time zone: UTC+01:00 (CET)
  - Summer (DST): UTC+02:00 (CEST)
- INSEE/Postal code: 55279 /55700
- ^{1} French Land Register data, which excludes lakes, ponds, glaciers > 1 km^{2} (0.386 sq mi or 247 acres) and river estuaries.

Laneuville-sur-Meuse (French pronunciation: [lanøvil syʁ møz], literally Laneuville on Meuse) is a commune in the Meuse department in Grand Est in north-eastern France.

== See also ==
- Communes of the Meuse department
