= Autréville-Saint-Lambert =

- Commune
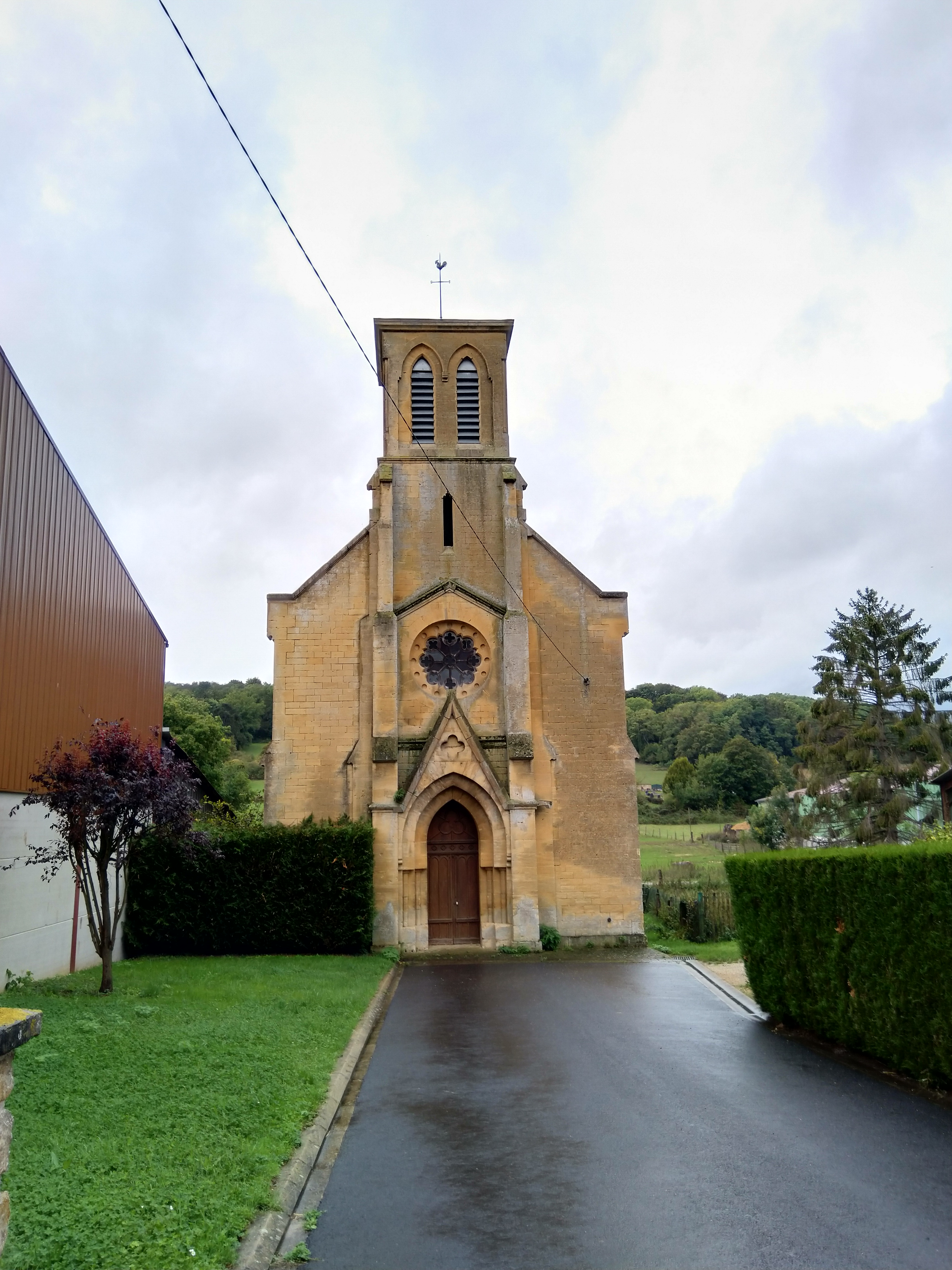
- Saint-Lambert church in 2018
- Location of Autréville-Saint-Lambert
- Location within France Location within Grand Est
- Coordinates: 49°33′45″N 5°07′44″E
- Country: France
- Region: Grand Est
- Department: Meuse
- Arrondissement: Verdun
- Canton: Stenay
- Intercommunality: CC Pays Stenay Val Dunois

Government
  - Mayor (2020–2026): Jean-Marie Baudier
- Area^{1}: 4.01 km^{2} (1.55 sq mi)
- Highest elevation: 343 m (1,125 ft)
- Lowest elevation: 166 m (545 ft)
- Population (2023): 33
  - Density: 8.2/km^{2} (21/sq mi)
- Time zone: UTC+01:00 (CET)
  - Summer (DST): UTC+02:00 (CEST)
- INSEE/Postal code: 55018 /55700
- ^{1} French Land Register data, which excludes lakes, ponds, glaciers > 1 km^{2} (0.386 sq mi or 247 acres) and river estuaries.

Autréville-Saint-Lambert (French pronunciation: [otʁevil sɛ̃ lɑ̃bɛʁ]) is a commune in the Meuse department in the Grand Est region in northeastern France.

== Population ==
Historical population
Year	Pop.	±% p.a.
1968	43	—
1975	48	+1.58%
1982	48	+0.00%
1990	39	−2.56%
1999	43	+1.09%
2007	47	+1.12%
2012	43	−1.76%
2017	40	−1.44%
2023	33	−3.16%
Source: INSEE

== See also ==
- Communes of the Meuse department
