= Beaufort-en-Argonne =

- Commune
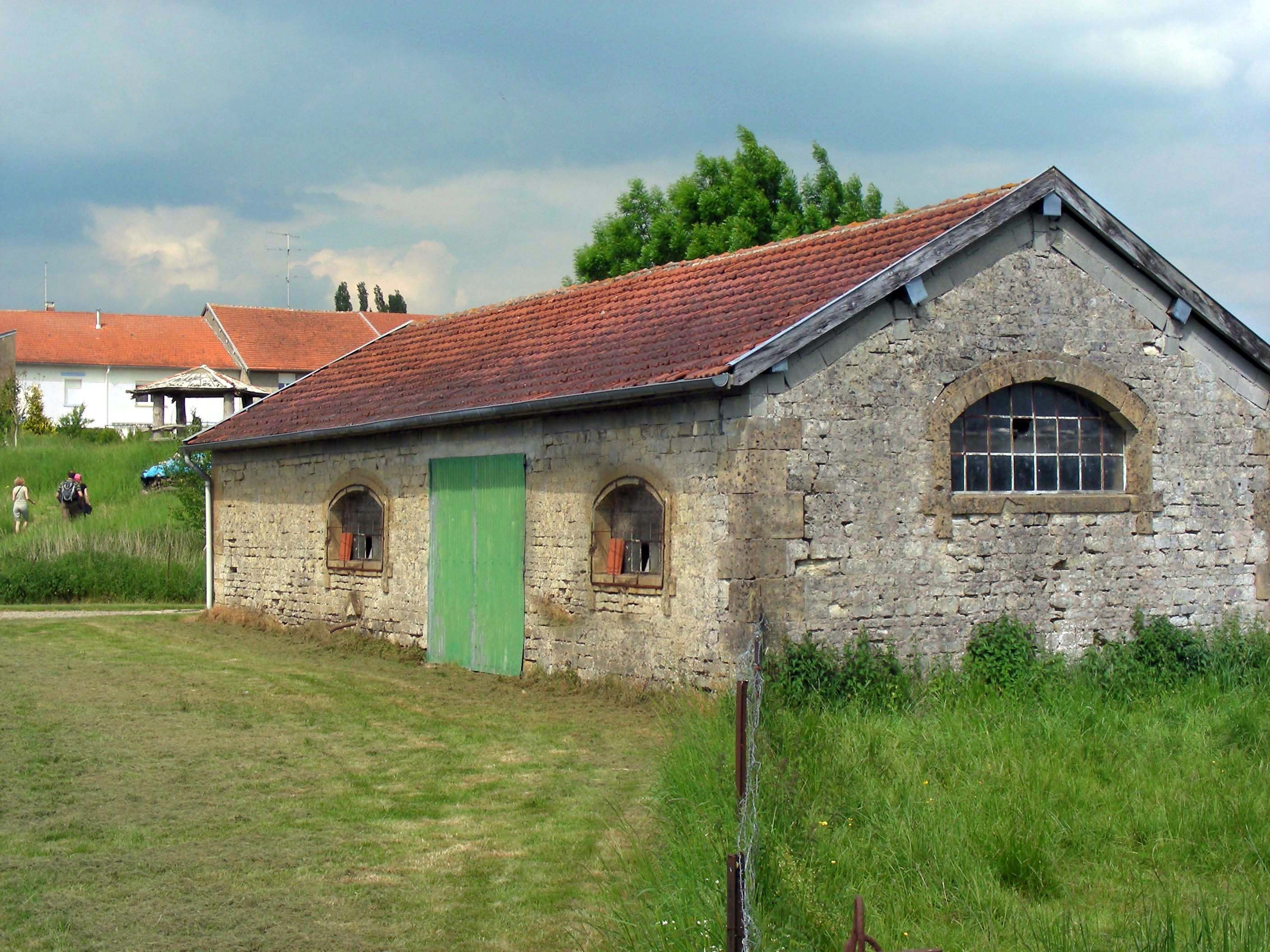
- The wash house in Beaufort-en-Argonne
- Location of Beaufort-en-Argonne
- Location within France Location within Grand Est
- Coordinates: 49°28′22″N 5°06′51″E
- Country: France
- Region: Grand Est
- Department: Meuse
- Arrondissement: Verdun
- Canton: Stenay

Government
  - Mayor (2021–2026): Joël Fourreaux
- Area^{1}: 11.09 km^{2} (4.28 sq mi)
- Elevation: 190 m (620 ft)
- Highest elevation: 245 m (804 ft)
- Lowest elevation: 175 m (574 ft)
- Population (2023): 127
  - Density: 11.5/km^{2} (29.7/sq mi)
- Time zone: UTC+01:00 (CET)
  - Summer (DST): UTC+02:00 (CEST)
- INSEE/Postal code: 55037 /55700
- ^{1} French Land Register data, which excludes lakes, ponds, glaciers > 1 km^{2} (0.386 sq mi or 247 acres) and river estuaries.

Beaufort-en-Argonne (French pronunciation: [bofɔʁ ɑ̃.n‿aʁɡɔn], literally Beaufort in Argonne) is a commune in the Meuse department in the Grand Est region in northeastern France.

== Population ==
Historical population
Year	Pop.	±% p.a.
1968	181	—
1975	178	−0.24%
1982	186	+0.63%
1990	174	−0.83%
1999	170	−0.26%
2007	161	−0.68%
2012	148	−1.67%
2017	144	−0.55%
2023	127	−2.07%
Source: INSEE

== History ==
Beaufort was the site of the final shot of World War I: a 95-pound shell fired at 10:59:59 AM on 11 November 1918 from a 155 mm howitzer nicknamed Calamity Jane, belonging to Battery E of the U.S. 11th Field Artillery, which was entrenched east of the town. The target is uncertain, but was probably the railway between Metz and Sedan.

== Government ==
The communities representative for the National Assembly of France is Jean-Louis Dumont.

== See also ==
- Communes of the Meuse department
