= Aincreville =

- Commune
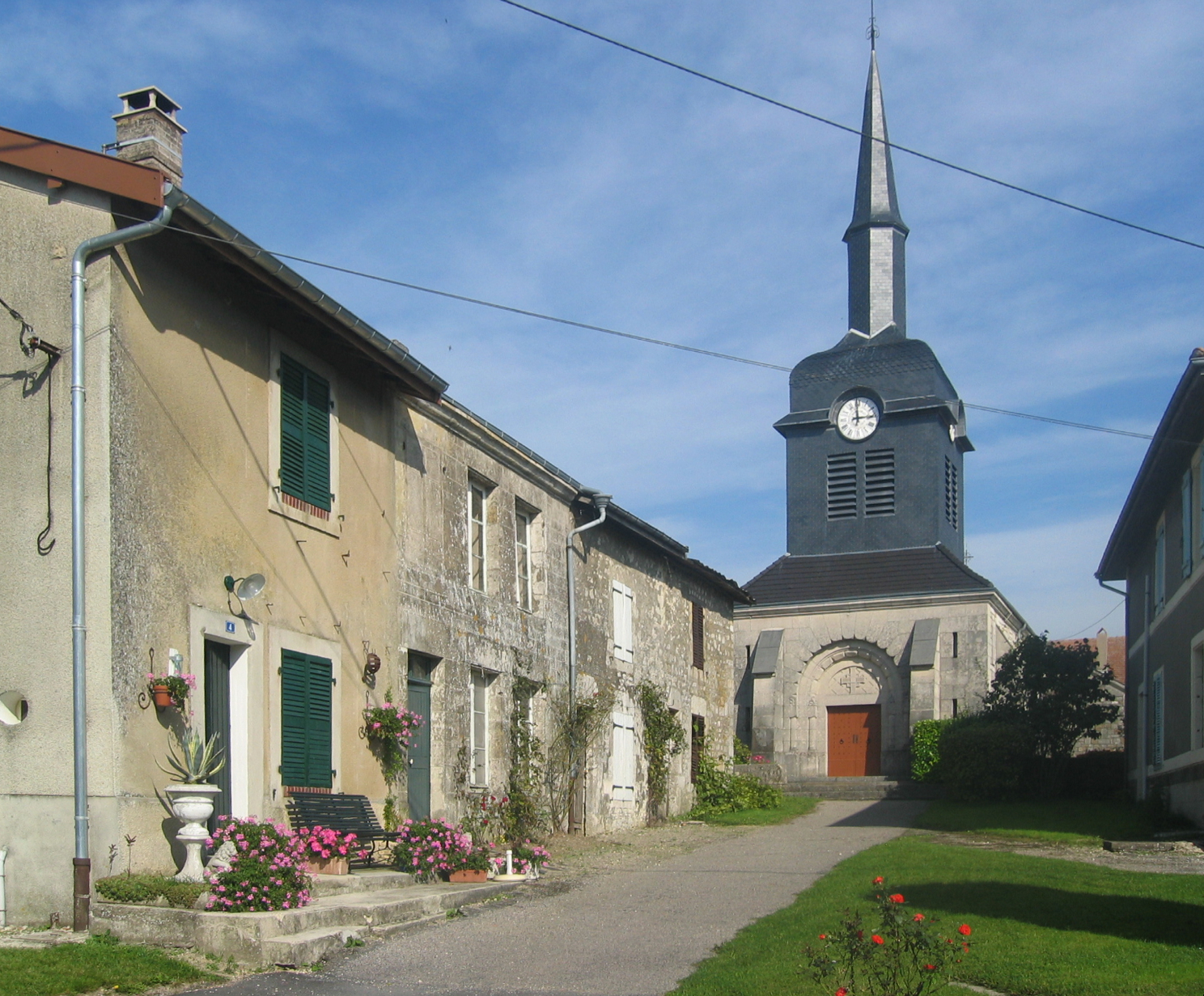
- The church in Aincreville

- Coat of arms
- Location of Aincreville
- Location within France Location within Grand Est
- Coordinates: 49°22′05″N 5°07′19″E
- Country: France
- Region: Grand Est
- Department: Meuse
- Arrondissement: Verdun
- Canton: Stenay
- Intercommunality: Pays de Stenay et du Val Dunois

Government
  - Mayor (2020–2026): Guy Ravenel
- Area^{1}: 9.11 km^{2} (3.52 sq mi)
- Elevation: 200 m (660 ft)
- Highest elevation: 314 m (1,030 ft)
- Lowest elevation: 187 m (614 ft)
- Population (2023): 80
  - Density: 8.8/km^{2} (23/sq mi)
- Time zone: UTC+01:00 (CET)
  - Summer (DST): UTC+02:00 (CEST)
- INSEE/Postal code: 55004 /55110
- ^{1} French Land Register data, which excludes lakes, ponds, glaciers > 1 km^{2} (0.386 sq mi or 247 acres) and river estuaries.

Aincreville (French pronunciation: [ɛ̃kʁəvil]) is a commune in the Meuse department in the Grand Est region in northeastern France.

== Population ==
Historical population
Year	Pop.	±% p.a.
1968	121	—
1975	90	−4.14%
1982	81	−1.49%
1990	83	+0.31%
1999	84	+0.13%
2007	91	+1.01%
2012	87	−0.89%
2017	69	−4.53%
2023	80	+2.50%
Source: INSEE

== See also ==
- Communes of the Meuse department
