= Baâlon =

- Commune
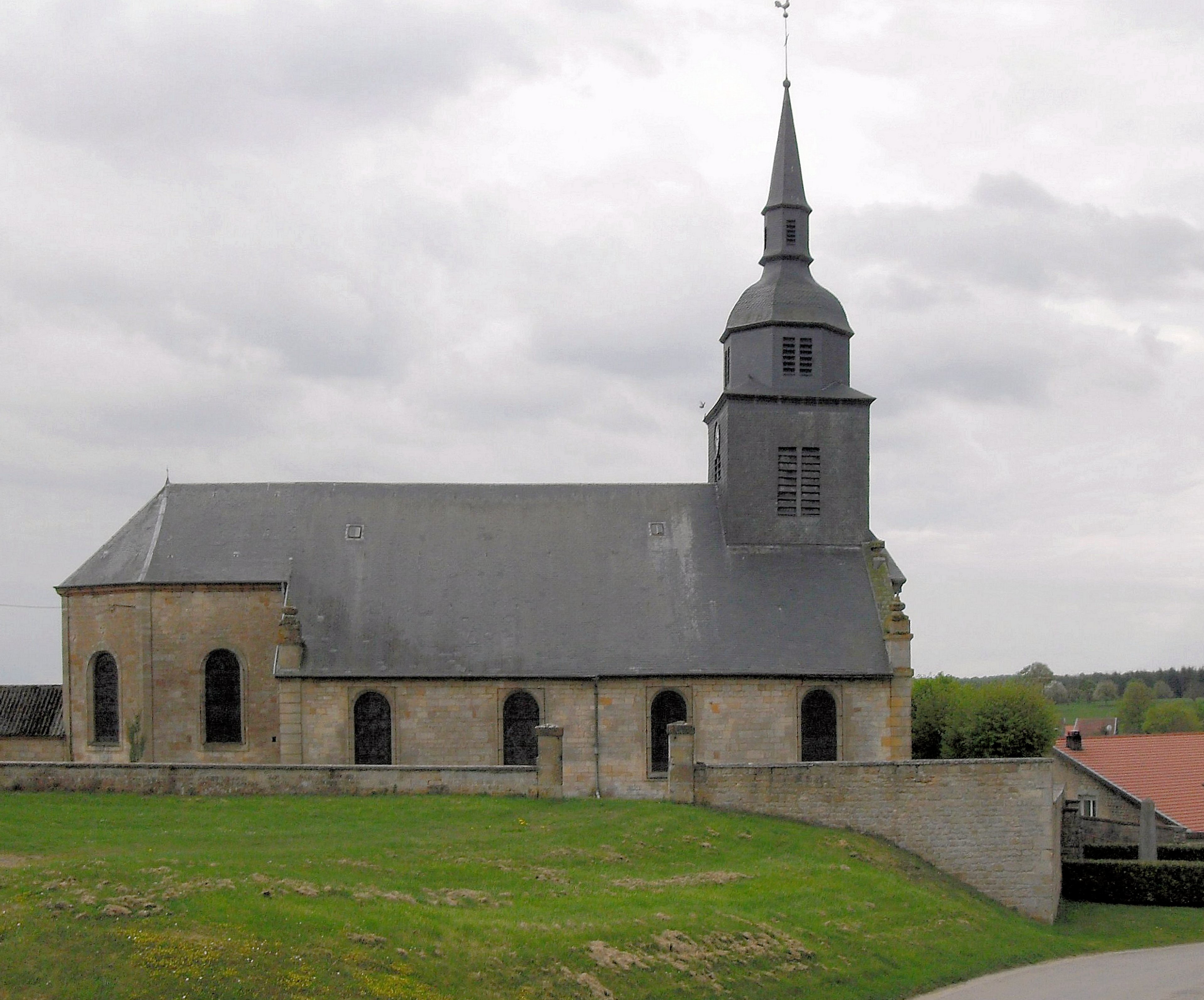
- The church in Baâlon

- Coat of arms
- Location of Baâlon
- Location within France Location within Grand Est
- Coordinates: 49°29′19″N 5°14′28″E
- Country: France
- Region: Grand Est
- Department: Meuse
- Arrondissement: Verdun
- Canton: Stenay
- Intercommunality: Pays de Stenay et du Val Dunois

Government
  - Mayor (2020–2026): Jean-Pierre Corvisier
- Area^{1}: 14.76 km^{2} (5.70 sq mi)
- Elevation: 210 m (690 ft)
- Highest elevation: 278 m (912 ft)
- Lowest elevation: 186 m (610 ft)
- Population (2023): 260
  - Density: 18/km^{2} (46/sq mi)
- Time zone: UTC+01:00 (CET)
  - Summer (DST): UTC+02:00 (CEST)
- INSEE/Postal code: 55025 /55700
- ^{1} French Land Register data, which excludes lakes, ponds, glaciers > 1 km^{2} (0.386 sq mi or 247 acres) and river estuaries.

Baâlon (French pronunciation: [balɔ̃]) is a commune in the Meuse department in the Grand Est region in northeastern France.

== Population ==
Historical population
Year	Pop.	±% p.a.
1968	272	—
1975	282	+0.52%
1982	286	+0.20%
1990	287	+0.04%
1999	267	−0.80%
2007	268	+0.05%
2012	288	+1.45%
2017	290	+0.14%
2023	260	−1.80%
Source: INSEE

== See also ==
- Communes of the Meuse department
