= Canton of Stenay =

Coordinates: 49.49°N 5.19°E

The canton of Stenay is an administrative division of the Meuse department, northeastern France. Its borders were modified at the French canton reorganisation which came into effect in March 2015. Its seat is in Stenay.

It consists of the following communes:

1. Aincreville
2. Autréville-Saint-Lambert
3. Baâlon
4. Beauclair
5. Beaufort-en-Argonne
6. Brieulles-sur-Meuse
7. Brouennes
8. Cesse
9. Cléry-le-Grand
10. Cléry-le-Petit
11. Doulcon
12. Dun-sur-Meuse
13. Fontaines-Saint-Clair
14. Halles-sous-les-Côtes
15. Inor
16. Lamouilly
17. Laneuville-sur-Meuse
18. Liny-devant-Dun
19. Lion-devant-Dun
20. Luzy-Saint-Martin
21. Martincourt-sur-Meuse
22. Milly-sur-Bradon
23. Mont-devant-Sassey
24. Montigny-devant-Sassey
25. Moulins-Saint-Hubert
26. Mouzay
27. Murvaux
28. Nepvant
29. Olizy-sur-Chiers
30. Pouilly-sur-Meuse
31. Sassey-sur-Meuse
32. Saulmory-Villefranche
33. Stenay
34. Villers-devant-Dun
35. Wiseppe
