= Inor, Meuse =

Inor
- Commune
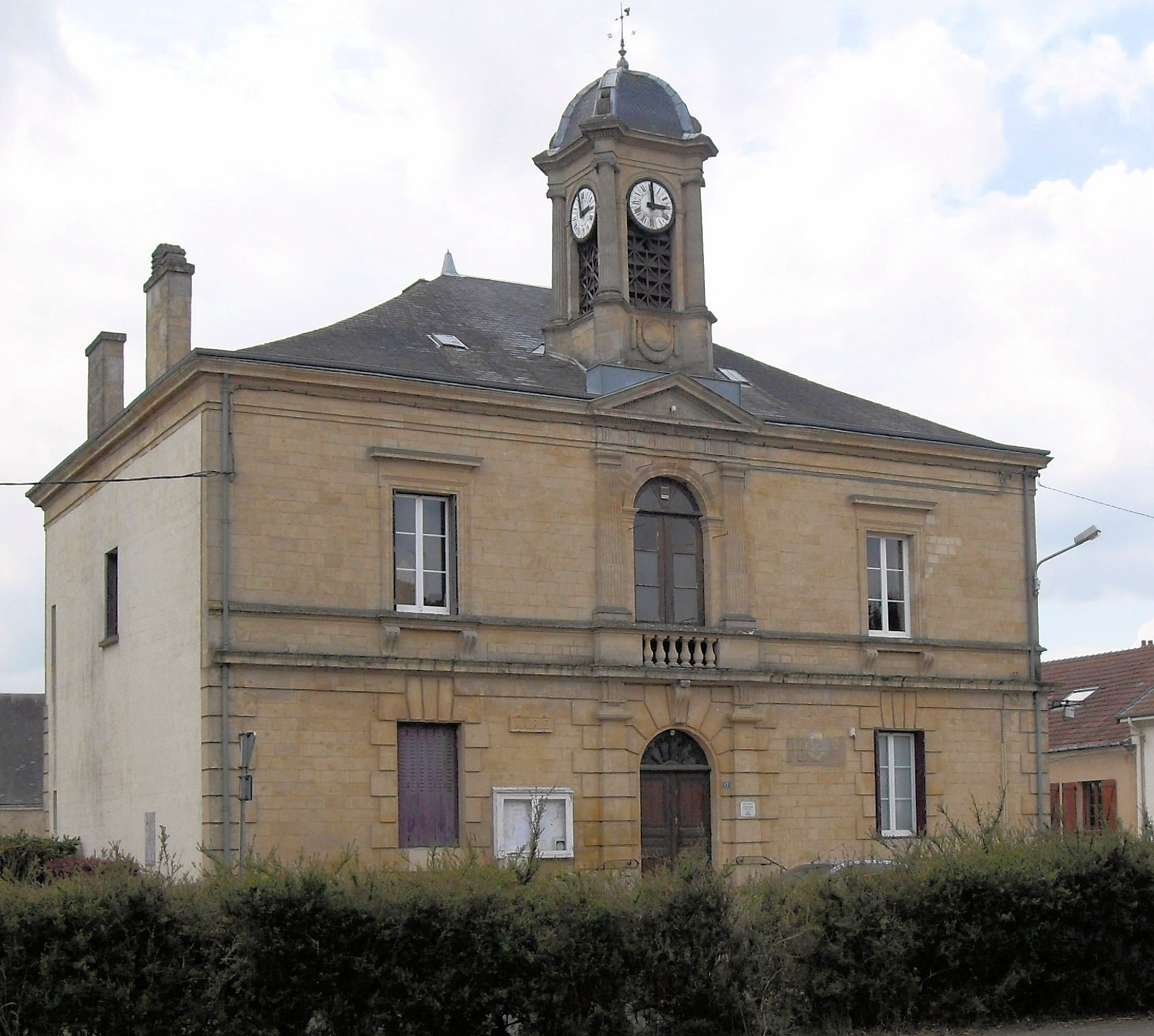
- The town hall in Inor

- Coat of arms
- Location of Inor
- Location within France Location within Grand Est
- Coordinates: 49°32′51″N 5°09′48″E
- Country: France
- Region: Grand Est
- Department: Meuse
- Arrondissement: Verdun
- Canton: Stenay

Government
  - Mayor (2020–2026): Sébastien Gillet
- Area^{1}: 6.46 km^{2} (2.49 sq mi)
- Elevation: 180 m (590 ft)
- Highest elevation: 326 m (1,070 ft)
- Lowest elevation: 161 m (528 ft)
- Population (2023): 177
  - Density: 27.4/km^{2} (71.0/sq mi)
- Time zone: UTC+01:00 (CET)
  - Summer (DST): UTC+02:00 (CEST)
- INSEE/Postal code: 55250 /55700
- ^{1} French Land Register data, which excludes lakes, ponds, glaciers > 1 km^{2} (0.386 sq mi or 247 acres) and river estuaries.

Inor (French pronunciation: [inɔʁ]) is a commune in the Meuse department in Grand Est in north-eastern France.

== Demography ==
Historical population
Year	Pop.	±% p.a.
1968	267	—
1975	248	−1.05%
1982	214	−2.08%
1990	183	−1.94%
1999	204	+1.21%
2007	214	+0.60%
2012	191	−2.25%
2017	185	−0.64%
2023	177	−0.73%
Source: INSEE

== See also ==
- Communes of the Meuse department
