= Martincourt-sur-Meuse =

- Commune
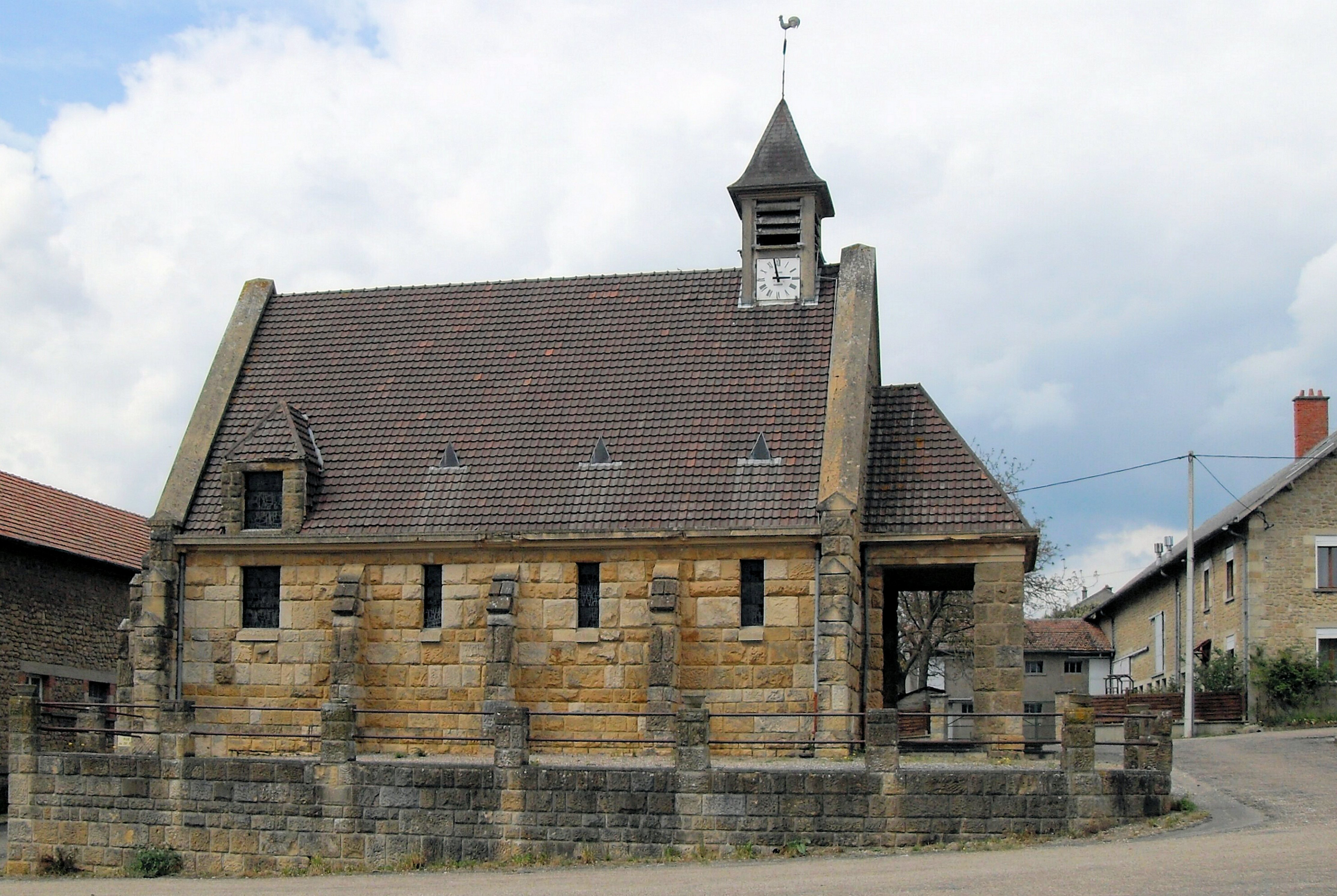
- The church in Martincourt-sur-Meuse
- Location of Martincourt-sur-Meuse
- Location within France Location within Grand Est
- Coordinates: 49°32′02″N 5°10′25″E
- Country: France
- Region: Grand Est
- Department: Meuse
- Arrondissement: Verdun
- Canton: Stenay
- Intercommunality: CC du Pays de Stenay et du Val Dunois

Government
  - Mayor (2020–2026): Gilles Herveux
- Area^{1}: 5.96 km^{2} (2.30 sq mi)
- Elevation: 190 m (620 ft)
- Highest elevation: 316 m (1,037 ft)
- Lowest elevation: 162 m (531 ft)
- Population (2023): 66
  - Density: 11/km^{2} (29/sq mi)
- Demonym: Martinicurtiens
- Time zone: UTC+01:00 (CET)
  - Summer (DST): UTC+02:00 (CEST)
- INSEE/Postal code: 55323 /55700
- ^{1} French Land Register data, which excludes lakes, ponds, glaciers > 1 km^{2} (0.386 sq mi or 247 acres) and river estuaries.

Martincourt-sur-Meuse is a commune in the Meuse department in Grand Est in north-eastern France.

== See also ==
- Communes of the Meuse department
