= Sassey-sur-Meuse =

- Commune
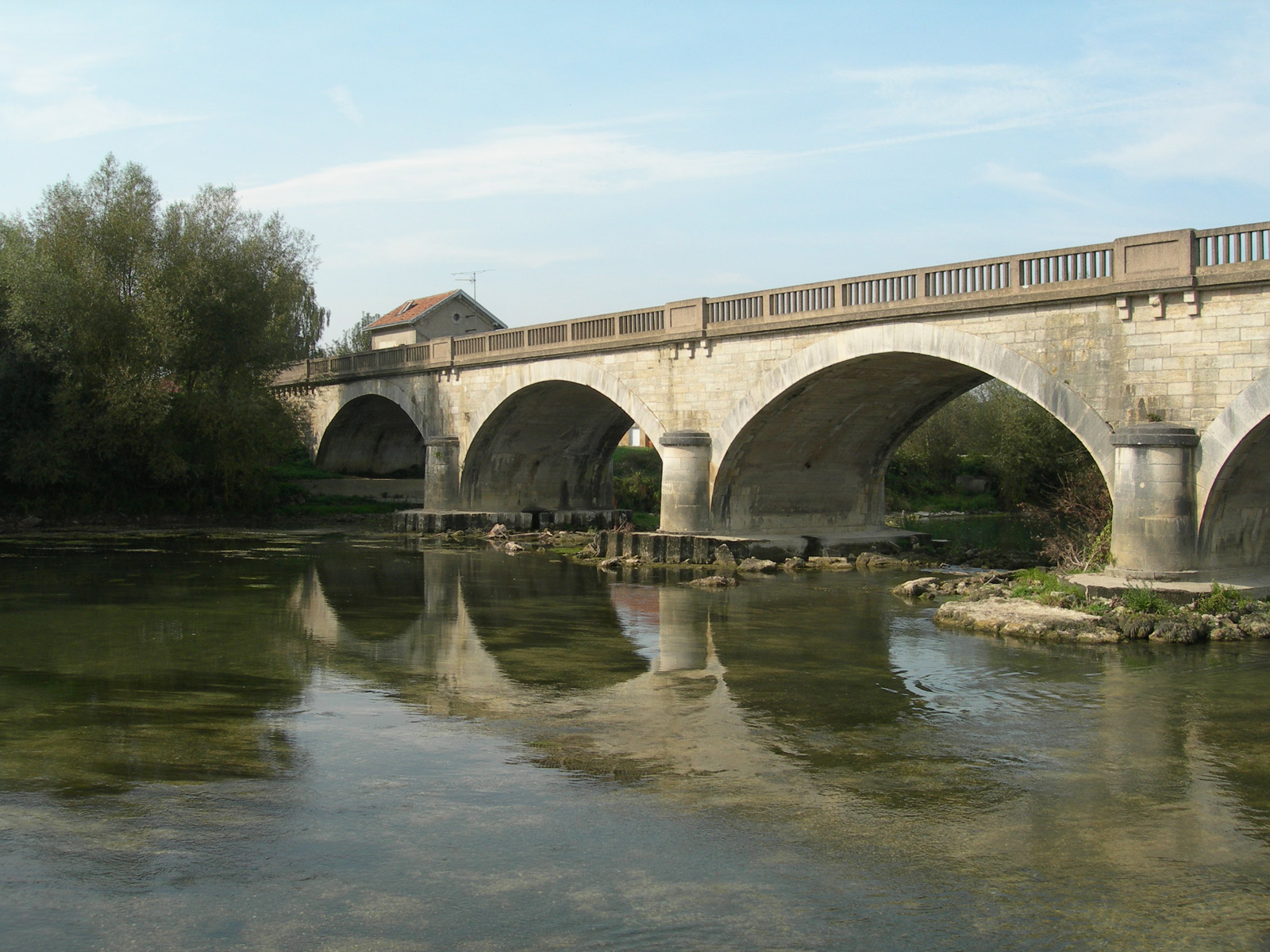
- The Meuse bridge in Sassey-sur-Meuse

- Coat of arms
- Location of Sassey-sur-Meuse
- Location within France Location within Grand Est
- Coordinates: 49°24′51″N 5°11′23″E
- Country: France
- Region: Grand Est
- Department: Meuse
- Arrondissement: Verdun
- Canton: Stenay
- Intercommunality: CC du Pays de Stenay et du Val Dunois

Government
  - Mayor (2020–2026): Marie-Noëlle Baudier
- Area^{1}: 4.33 km^{2} (1.67 sq mi)
- Elevation: 176 m (577 ft)
- Highest elevation: 297 m (974 ft)
- Lowest elevation: 169 m (554 ft)
- Population (2023): 93
  - Density: 21/km^{2} (56/sq mi)
- Time zone: UTC+01:00 (CET)
  - Summer (DST): UTC+02:00 (CEST)
- INSEE/Postal code: 55469 /55110
- ^{1} French Land Register data, which excludes lakes, ponds, glaciers > 1 km^{2} (0.386 sq mi or 247 acres) and river estuaries.

Sassey-sur-Meuse (French pronunciation: [sasɛ syʁ møz], literally Sassey on Meuse) is a commune in the Meuse department in Grand Est in north-eastern France.

== See also ==
- Communes of the Meuse department
