= Villers-sous-Pareid =

- Commune
- Coat of arms
- Location of Villers-sous-Pareid
- Location within France Location within Grand Est
- Coordinates: 49°07′32″N 5°44′06″E
- Country: France
- Region: Grand Est
- Department: Meuse
- Arrondissement: Verdun
- Canton: Étain
- Intercommunality: Territoire de Fresnes-en-Woëvre

Government
  - Mayor (2020–2026): Stéphanie Perin
- Area^{1}: 6.12 km^{2} (2.36 sq mi)
- Elevation: 209 m (686 ft)
- Highest elevation: 226 m (741 ft)
- Lowest elevation: 200 m (660 ft)
- Population (2023): 77
  - Density: 13/km^{2} (33/sq mi)
- Time zone: UTC+01:00 (CET)
  - Summer (DST): UTC+02:00 (CEST)
- INSEE/Postal code: 55565 /55160
- ^{1} French Land Register data, which excludes lakes, ponds, glaciers > 1 km^{2} (0.386 sq mi or 247 acres) and river estuaries.

Villers-sous-Pareid (French pronunciation: [vilɛʁ su paʁɛ], literally Villers under Pareid) is a commune in the Meuse department in Grand Est in north-eastern France.

== See also ==
- Communes of the Meuse department
