= Warcq =

Warcq may refer to the following places in France:

- Warcq, Ardennes, a commune in the Ardennes department
- Warcq, Meuse, a commune in the Meuse department
