= Saint-Jean-lès-Buzy =

- Commune
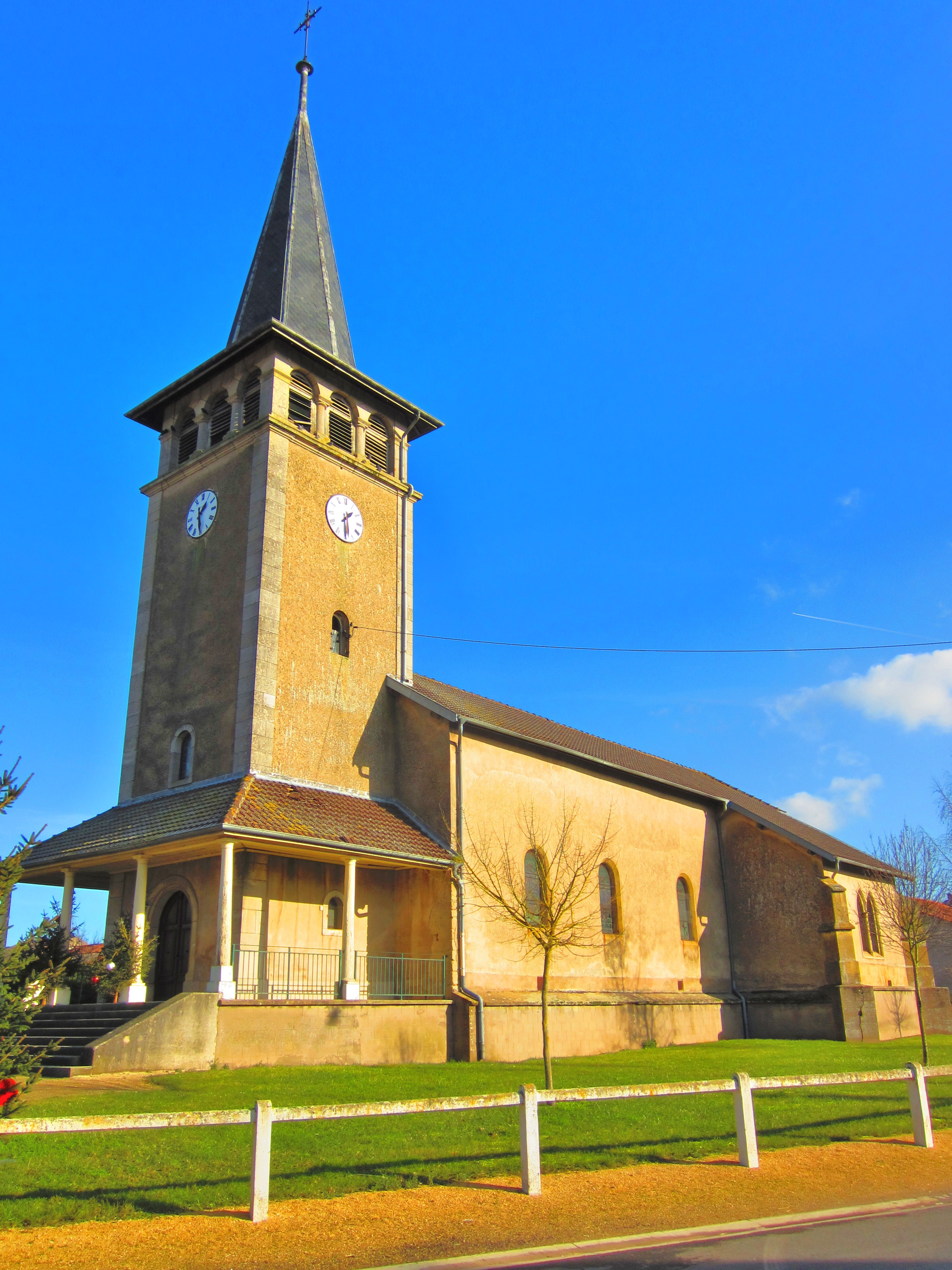
- The church in Saint-Jean-lès-Buzy

- Coat of arms
- Location of Saint-Jean-lès-Buzy
- Location within France Location within Grand Est
- Coordinates: 49°10′01″N 5°43′45″E
- Country: France
- Region: Grand Est
- Department: Meuse
- Arrondissement: Verdun
- Canton: Étain
- Intercommunality: Pays d'Étain

Government
  - Mayor (2020–2026): Camille Boudot
- Area^{1}: 10.34 km^{2} (3.99 sq mi)
- Elevation: 195 m (640 ft)
- Highest elevation: 231 m (758 ft)
- Lowest elevation: 190 m (620 ft)
- Population (2023): 368
  - Density: 35.6/km^{2} (92.2/sq mi)
- Time zone: UTC+01:00 (CET)
  - Summer (DST): UTC+02:00 (CEST)
- INSEE/Postal code: 55458 /55400
- ^{1} French Land Register data, which excludes lakes, ponds, glaciers > 1 km^{2} (0.386 sq mi or 247 acres) and river estuaries.

Saint-Jean-lès-Buzy (French pronunciation: [sɛ̃ ʒɑ̃ lɛ byzi], literally Saint-Jean near Buzy) is a commune in the Meuse department in Grand Est in north-eastern France.

== See also ==
- Communes of the Meuse department
