= Maizeray =

- Commune
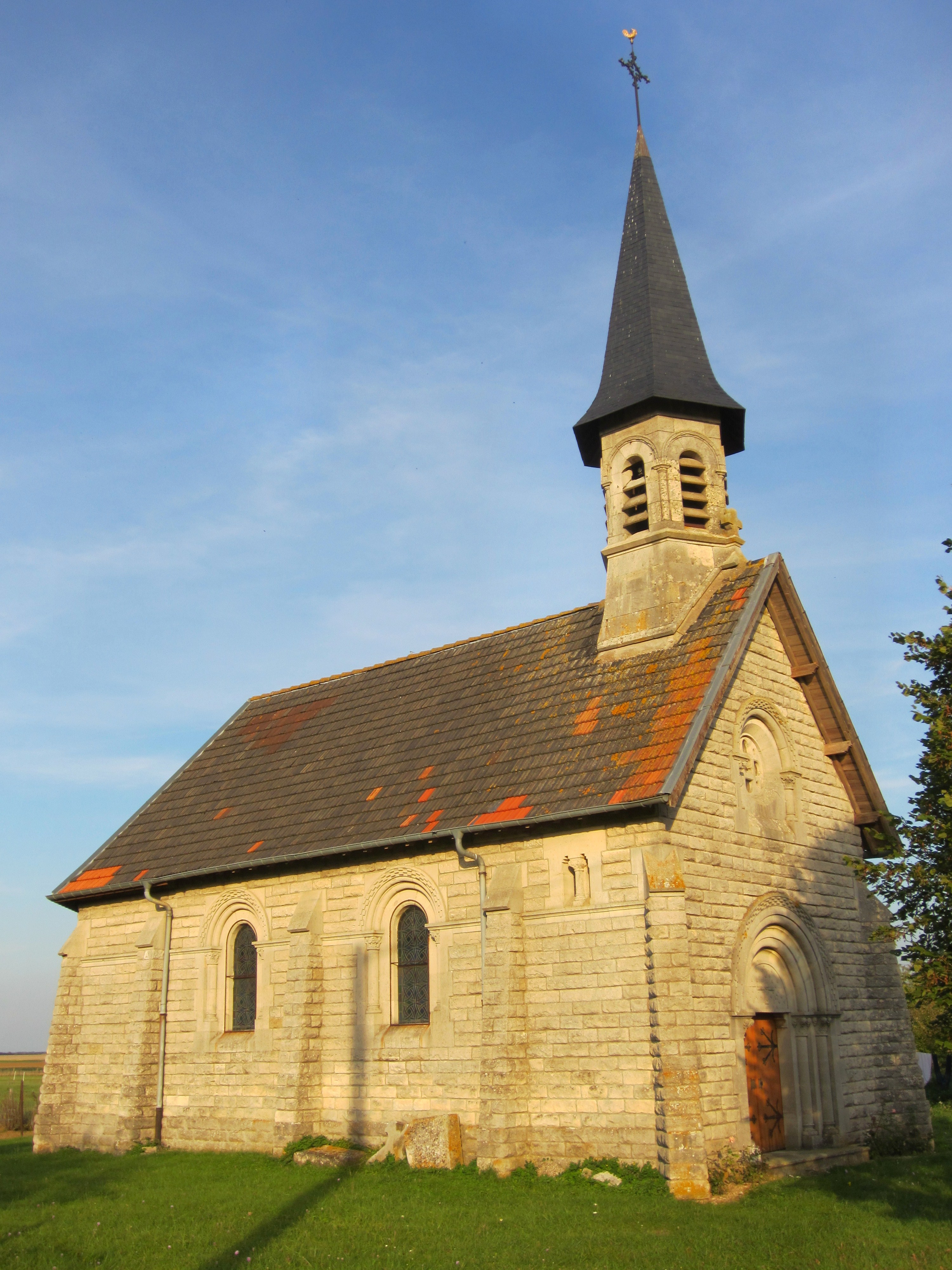
- The church in Maizeray

- Coat of arms
- Location of Maizeray
- Location within France Location within Grand Est
- Coordinates: 49°06′11″N 5°42′07″E
- Country: France
- Region: Grand Est
- Department: Meuse
- Arrondissement: Verdun
- Canton: Étain
- Intercommunality: Territoire de Fresnes-en-Woëvre

Government
  - Mayor (2020–2026): Denis Lesongeur
- Area^{1}: 3.87 km^{2} (1.49 sq mi)
- Elevation: 230 m (750 ft)
- Highest elevation: 225 m (738 ft)
- Lowest elevation: 208 m (682 ft)
- Population (2023): 26
  - Density: 6.7/km^{2} (17/sq mi)
- Time zone: UTC+01:00 (CET)
  - Summer (DST): UTC+02:00 (CEST)
- INSEE/Postal code: 55311 /55160
- ^{1} French Land Register data, which excludes lakes, ponds, glaciers > 1 km^{2} (0.386 sq mi or 247 acres) and river estuaries.

Maizeray (French pronunciation: [mɛzʁɛ]) is a commune in the Meuse department in Grand Est in north-eastern France.

== See also ==
- Communes of the Meuse department
