= Canton of Étain =

Coordinates: 49.21°N 5.64°E

The canton of Étain is an administrative division of the Meuse department, northeastern France. Its borders were modified at the French canton reorganisation which came into effect in March 2015. Its seat is in Étain.

It consists of the following communes:

1. Avillers-Sainte-Croix
2. Boinville-en-Woëvre
3. Bonzée
4. Braquis
5. Buzy-Darmont
6. Combres-sous-les-Côtes
7. Dommartin-la-Montagne
8. Doncourt-aux-Templiers
9. Les Éparges
10. Étain
11. Fresnes-en-Woëvre
12. Fromezey
13. Gussainville
14. Hannonville-sous-les-Côtes
15. Harville
16. Haudiomont
17. Hennemont
18. Herbeuville
19. Herméville-en-Woëvre
20. Labeuville
21. Latour-en-Woëvre
22. Maizeray
23. Manheulles
24. Marchéville-en-Woëvre
25. Mouilly
26. Moulotte
27. Pareid
28. Parfondrupt
29. Pintheville
30. Riaville
31. Ronvaux
32. Saint-Hilaire-en-Woëvre
33. Saint-Jean-lès-Buzy
34. Saint-Remy-la-Calonne
35. Saulx-lès-Champlon
36. Thillot
37. Trésauvaux
38. Ville-en-Woëvre
39. Villers-sous-Pareid
40. Warcq
41. Watronville
42. Woël
