= Latour-en-Woëvre =

- Commune
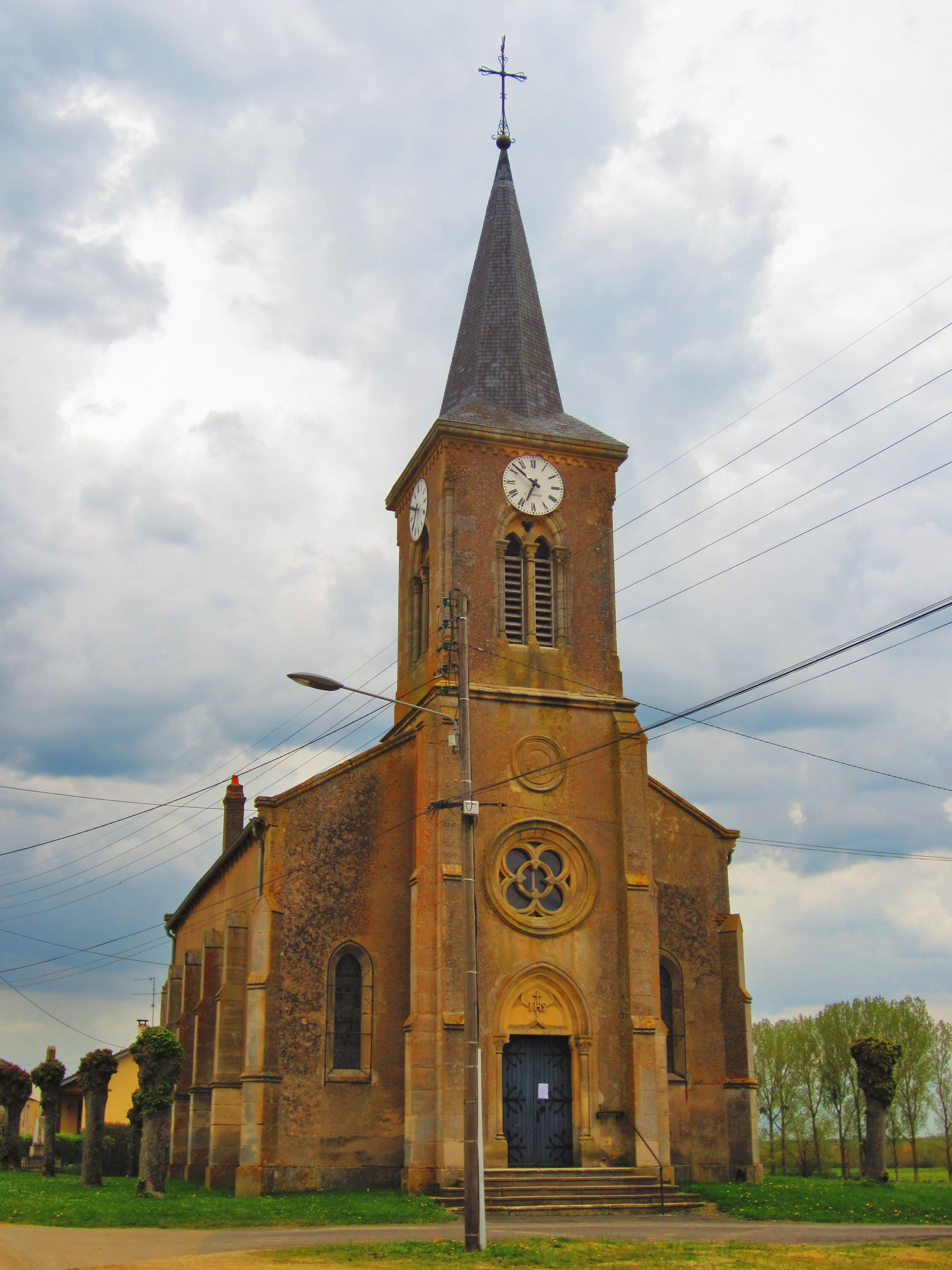
- The church in Latour-en-Woëvre

- Coat of arms
- Location of Latour-en-Woëvre
- Location within France Location within Grand Est
- Coordinates: 49°05′19″N 5°48′56″E
- Country: France
- Region: Grand Est
- Department: Meuse
- Arrondissement: Verdun
- Canton: Étain
- Intercommunality: Territoire de Fresnes-en-Woëvre

Government
  - Mayor (2020–2026): Claude Jamin
- Area^{1}: 6.74 km^{2} (2.60 sq mi)
- Elevation: 215 m (705 ft)
- Highest elevation: 219 m (719 ft)
- Lowest elevation: 196 m (643 ft)
- Population (2023): 84
  - Density: 12/km^{2} (32/sq mi)
- Time zone: UTC+01:00 (CET)
  - Summer (DST): UTC+02:00 (CEST)
- INSEE/Postal code: 55281 /55160
- ^{1} French Land Register data, which excludes lakes, ponds, glaciers > 1 km^{2} (0.386 sq mi or 247 acres) and river estuaries.

Latour-en-Woëvre (French pronunciation: [latuʁ ɑ̃ wavʁ]) is a commune in the Meuse department in Grand Est in north-eastern France.

== Twin/Sister Cities ==
• Rainhill, United Kingdom

== See also ==
- Communes of the Meuse department
