= Herméville-en-Woëvre =

- Commune
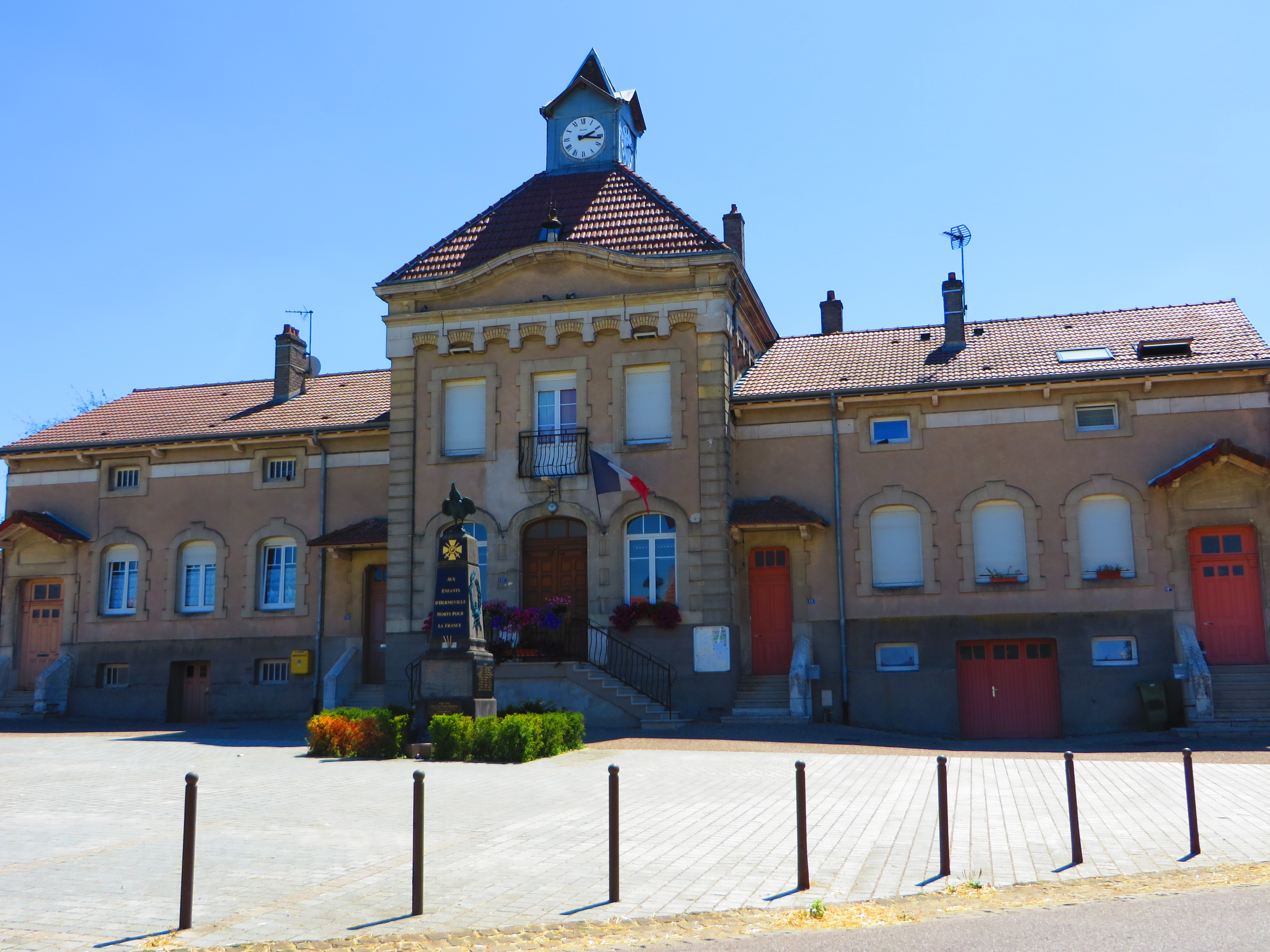
- The town hall in Herméville-en-Woëvre

- Coat of arms
- Location of Herméville-en-Woëvre
- Location within France Location within Grand Est
- Coordinates: 49°10′46″N 5°35′36″E
- Country: France
- Region: Grand Est
- Department: Meuse
- Arrondissement: Verdun
- Canton: Étain
- Intercommunality: CC du pays d'Étain

Government
  - Mayor (2020–2026): Evelyne Valencin
- Area^{1}: 14.64 km^{2} (5.65 sq mi)
- Elevation: 207 m (679 ft)
- Highest elevation: 223 m (732 ft)
- Lowest elevation: 199 m (653 ft)
- Population (2023): 218
  - Density: 14.9/km^{2} (38.6/sq mi)
- Time zone: UTC+01:00 (CET)
  - Summer (DST): UTC+02:00 (CEST)
- INSEE/Postal code: 55244 /55400
- ^{1} French Land Register data, which excludes lakes, ponds, glaciers > 1 km^{2} (0.386 sq mi or 247 acres) and river estuaries.

Herméville-en-Woëvre (French pronunciation: [ɛʁmevil ɑ̃ wavʁ]) is a commune in the Meuse department in Grand Est in north-eastern France.

== See also ==
- Communes of the Meuse department
