= Braquis =

- Commune
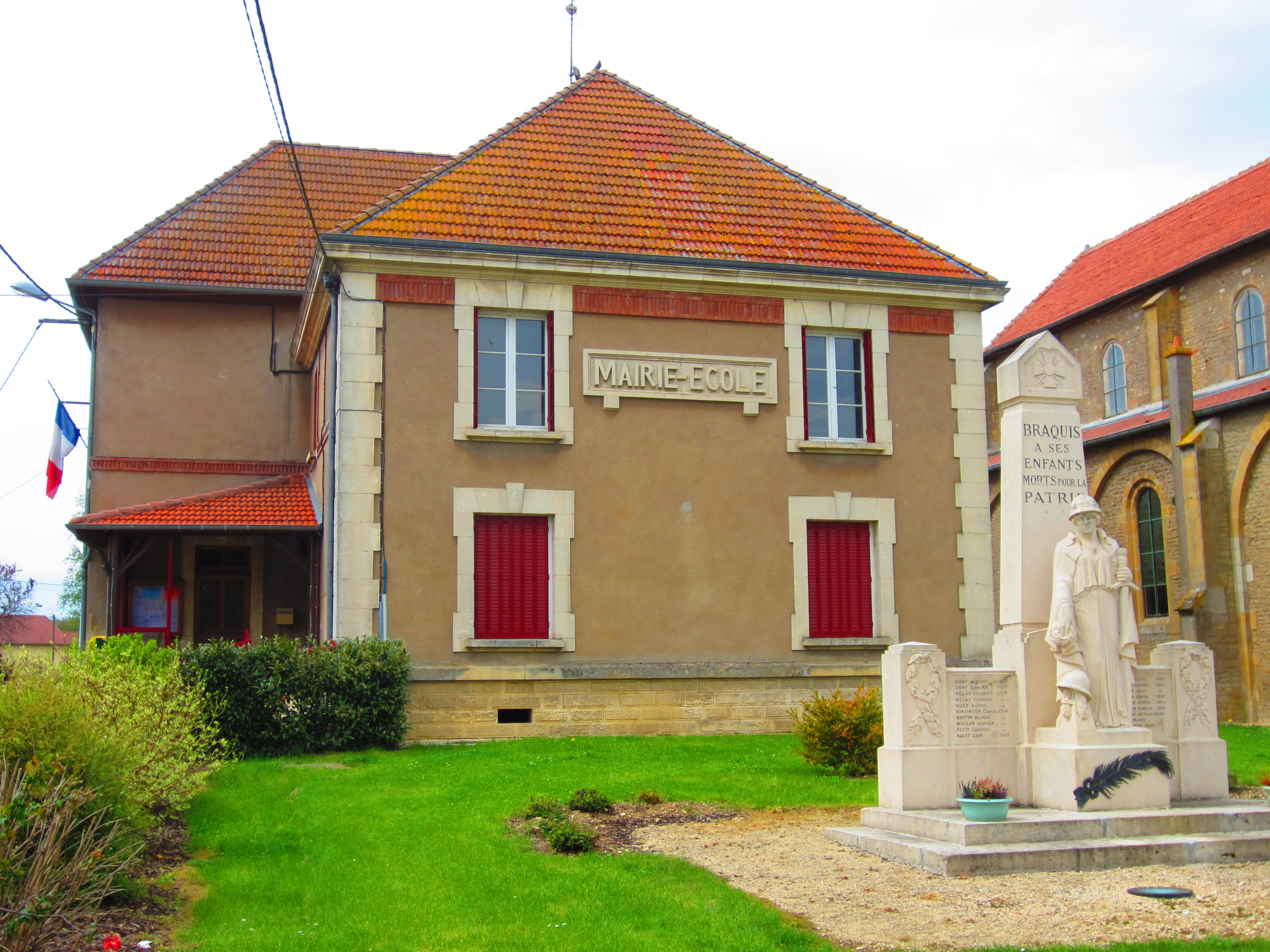
- The town hall in Braquis

- Coat of arms
- Location of Braquis
- Location within France Location within Grand Est
- Coordinates: 49°09′21″N 5°37′39″E
- Country: France
- Region: Grand Est
- Department: Meuse
- Arrondissement: Verdun
- Canton: Étain
- Intercommunality: Pays d'Étain

Government
  - Mayor (2020–2026): Maryse François
- Area^{1}: 4.95 km^{2} (1.91 sq mi)
- Elevation: 206 m (676 ft)
- Highest elevation: 222 m (728 ft)
- Lowest elevation: 199 m (653 ft)
- Population (2023): 105
  - Density: 21.2/km^{2} (54.9/sq mi)
- Time zone: UTC+01:00 (CET)
  - Summer (DST): UTC+02:00 (CEST)
- INSEE/Postal code: 55072 /55400
- ^{1} French Land Register data, which excludes lakes, ponds, glaciers > 1 km^{2} (0.386 sq mi or 247 acres) and river estuaries.

Braquis (French pronunciation: [bʁaki]) is a commune in the Meuse department in Grand Est in northeastern France.

== Population ==
Historical population
Year	Pop.	±% p.a.
1968	105	—
1975	104	−0.14%
1982	106	+0.27%
1990	87	−2.44%
1999	85	−0.26%
2007	86	+0.15%
2012	103	+3.67%
2017	119	+2.93%
2023	105	−2.06%
Source: INSEE

== See also ==
- Communes of the Meuse department
