= Watronville =

- Commune
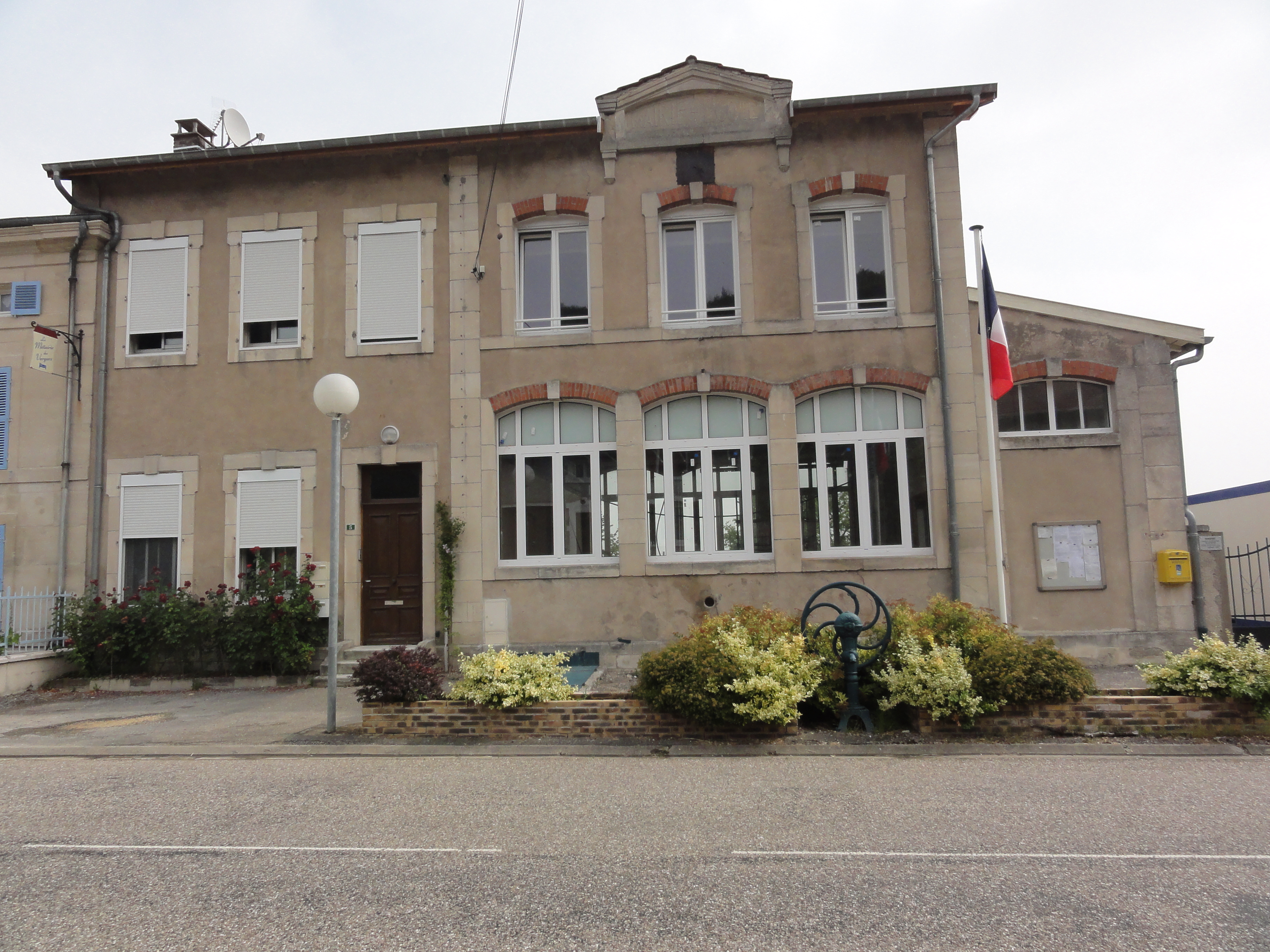
- The town hall in Watronville
- Location of Watronville
- Location within France Location within Grand Est
- Coordinates: 49°08′16″N 5°32′33″E
- Country: France
- Region: Grand Est
- Department: Meuse
- Arrondissement: Verdun
- Canton: Étain
- Intercommunality: Territoire de Fresnes-en-Woëvre

Government
  - Mayor (2020–2026): Franck Legrand
- Area^{1}: 6.39 km^{2} (2.47 sq mi)
- Elevation: 257 m (843 ft)
- Highest elevation: 363 m (1,191 ft)
- Lowest elevation: 215 m (705 ft)
- Population (2023): 103
  - Density: 16.1/km^{2} (41.7/sq mi)
- Time zone: UTC+01:00 (CET)
  - Summer (DST): UTC+02:00 (CEST)
- INSEE/Postal code: 55579 /55160
- ^{1} French Land Register data, which excludes lakes, ponds, glaciers > 1 km^{2} (0.386 sq mi or 247 acres) and river estuaries.

Watronville is a commune in the Meuse department in Grand Est in north-eastern France.

== Population ==
Historical population
Year	Pop.	±% p.a.
1968	134	—
1975	104	−3.56%
1982	101	−0.42%
1990	112	+1.30%
1999	103	−0.93%
2007	107	+0.48%
2012	112	+0.92%
2017	105	−1.28%
2023	103	−0.32%
Source: INSEE

== See also ==
- Communes of the Meuse department
