= Combres-sous-les-Côtes =

- Commune
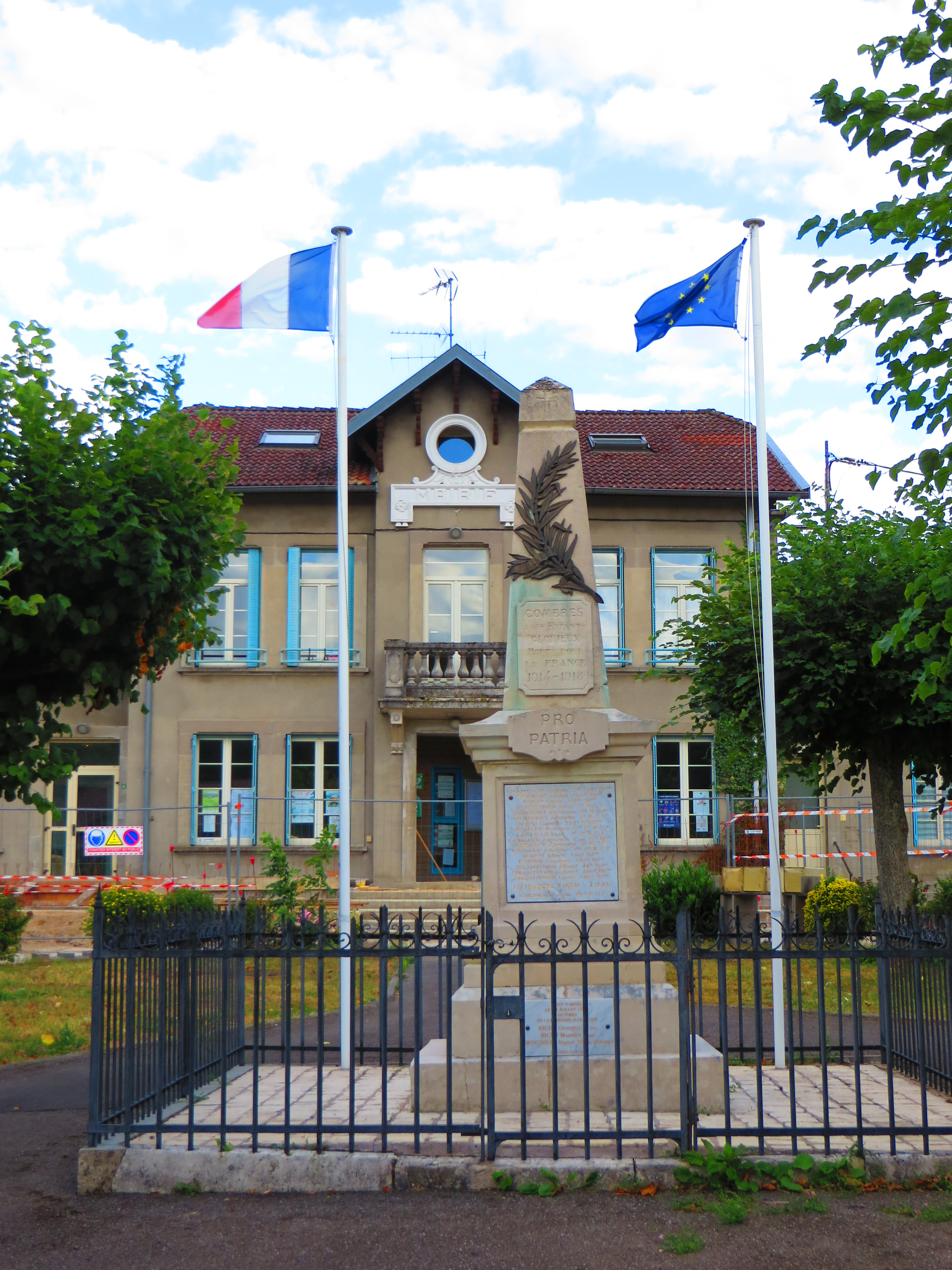
- The town hall in Combres-sous-les-Côtes
- Location of Combres-sous-les-Côtes
- Location within France Location within Grand Est
- Coordinates: 49°03′34″N 5°37′31″E
- Country: France
- Region: Grand Est
- Department: Meuse
- Arrondissement: Verdun
- Canton: Étain

Government
  - Mayor (2020–2026): Cynthia Pector
- Area^{1}: 5.06 km^{2} (1.95 sq mi)
- Elevation: 255 m (837 ft)
- Highest elevation: 373 m (1,224 ft)
- Lowest elevation: 226 m (741 ft)
- Population (2023): 108
  - Density: 21.3/km^{2} (55.3/sq mi)
- Time zone: UTC+01:00 (CET)
  - Summer (DST): UTC+02:00 (CEST)
- INSEE/Postal code: 55121 /55160
- ^{1} French Land Register data, which excludes lakes, ponds, glaciers > 1 km^{2} (0.386 sq mi or 247 acres) and river estuaries.

Combres-sous-les-Côtes (French pronunciation: [kɔ̃bʁ su le kot]) is a commune in the Meuse department in Grand Est in north-eastern France.

== See also ==
- Communes of the Meuse department
- Parc naturel régional de Lorraine
