= Gussainville =

- Commune
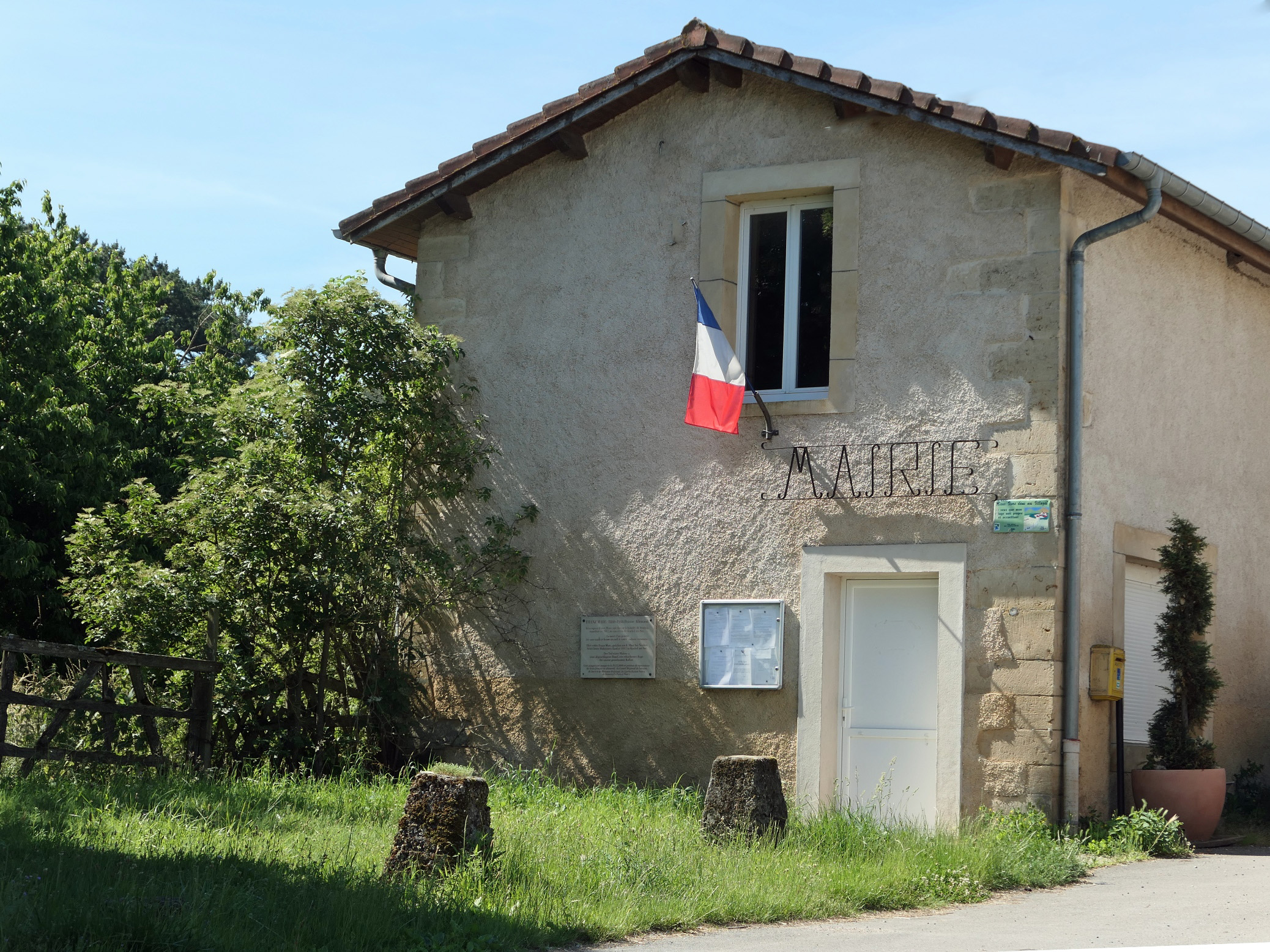
- Town hall

- Coat of arms
- Location of Gussainville
- Location within France Location within Grand Est
- Coordinates: 49°10′18″N 5°40′47″E
- Country: France
- Region: Grand Est
- Department: Meuse
- Arrondissement: Verdun
- Canton: Étain
- Intercommunality: CC du pays d'Étain

Government
  - Mayor (2020–2026): Francis Lefort
- Area^{1}: 10.48 km^{2} (4.05 sq mi)
- Elevation: 200 m (660 ft)
- Highest elevation: 218 m (715 ft)
- Lowest elevation: 190 m (620 ft)
- Population (2023): 35
  - Density: 3.3/km^{2} (8.6/sq mi)
- Time zone: UTC+01:00 (CET)
  - Summer (DST): UTC+02:00 (CEST)
- INSEE/Postal code: 55222 /55400
- ^{1} French Land Register data, which excludes lakes, ponds, glaciers > 1 km^{2} (0.386 sq mi or 247 acres) and river estuaries.

Gussainville (French pronunciation: [ɡysɛ̃vil]) is a commune in the Meuse department in Grand Est in north-eastern France.

== See also ==
- Communes of the Meuse department
