= Labeuville =

- Commune
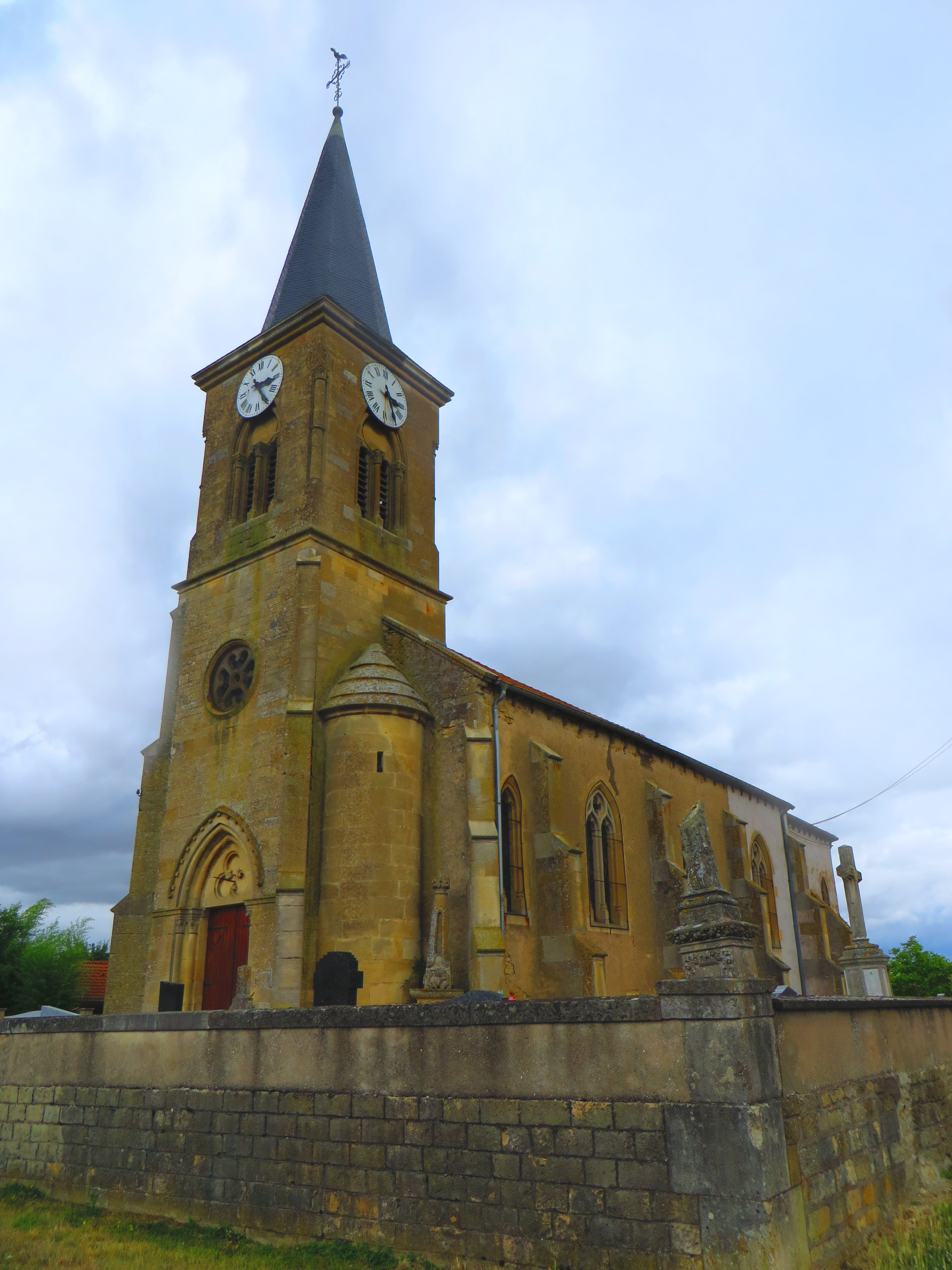
- The church in Labeuville

- Coat of arms
- Location of Labeuville
- Location within France Location within Grand Est
- Coordinates: 49°05′51″N 5°47′37″E
- Country: France
- Region: Grand Est
- Department: Meuse
- Arrondissement: Verdun
- Canton: Étain
- Intercommunality: Territoire de Fresnes-en-Woëvre

Government
  - Mayor (2020–2026): Michel Marchand
- Area^{1}: 9.58 km^{2} (3.70 sq mi)
- Elevation: 210 m (690 ft)
- Highest elevation: 221 m (725 ft)
- Lowest elevation: 195 m (640 ft)
- Population (2023): 139
  - Density: 14.5/km^{2} (37.6/sq mi)
- Time zone: UTC+01:00 (CET)
  - Summer (DST): UTC+02:00 (CEST)
- INSEE/Postal code: 55265 /55160
- ^{1} French Land Register data, which excludes lakes, ponds, glaciers > 1 km^{2} (0.386 sq mi or 247 acres) and river estuaries.

Labeuville (French pronunciation: [labøvil]) is a commune in the Meuse department in Grand Est in north-eastern France.

== See also ==
- Communes of the Meuse department
