= Moulotte =

- Commune
- Coat of arms
- Location of Moulotte
- Location within France Location within Grand Est
- Coordinates: 49°06′08″N 5°44′26″E
- Country: France
- Region: Grand Est
- Department: Meuse
- Arrondissement: Verdun
- Canton: Étain
- Intercommunality: Territoire de Fresnes-en-Woëvre

Government
  - Mayor (2020–2026): Sylvie Paris
- Area^{1}: 5.53 km^{2} (2.14 sq mi)
- Elevation: 208 m (682 ft)
- Highest elevation: 221 m (725 ft)
- Lowest elevation: 197 m (646 ft)
- Population (2023): 87
  - Density: 16/km^{2} (41/sq mi)
- Time zone: UTC+01:00 (CET)
  - Summer (DST): UTC+02:00 (CEST)
- INSEE/Postal code: 55363 /55160
- ^{1} French Land Register data, which excludes lakes, ponds, glaciers > 1 km^{2} (0.386 sq mi or 247 acres) and river estuaries.

Moulotte (French pronunciation: [mulɔt]) is a commune in the Meuse department in Grand Est in north-eastern France.

== See also ==
- Communes of the Meuse department
