= Pintheville =

- Commune
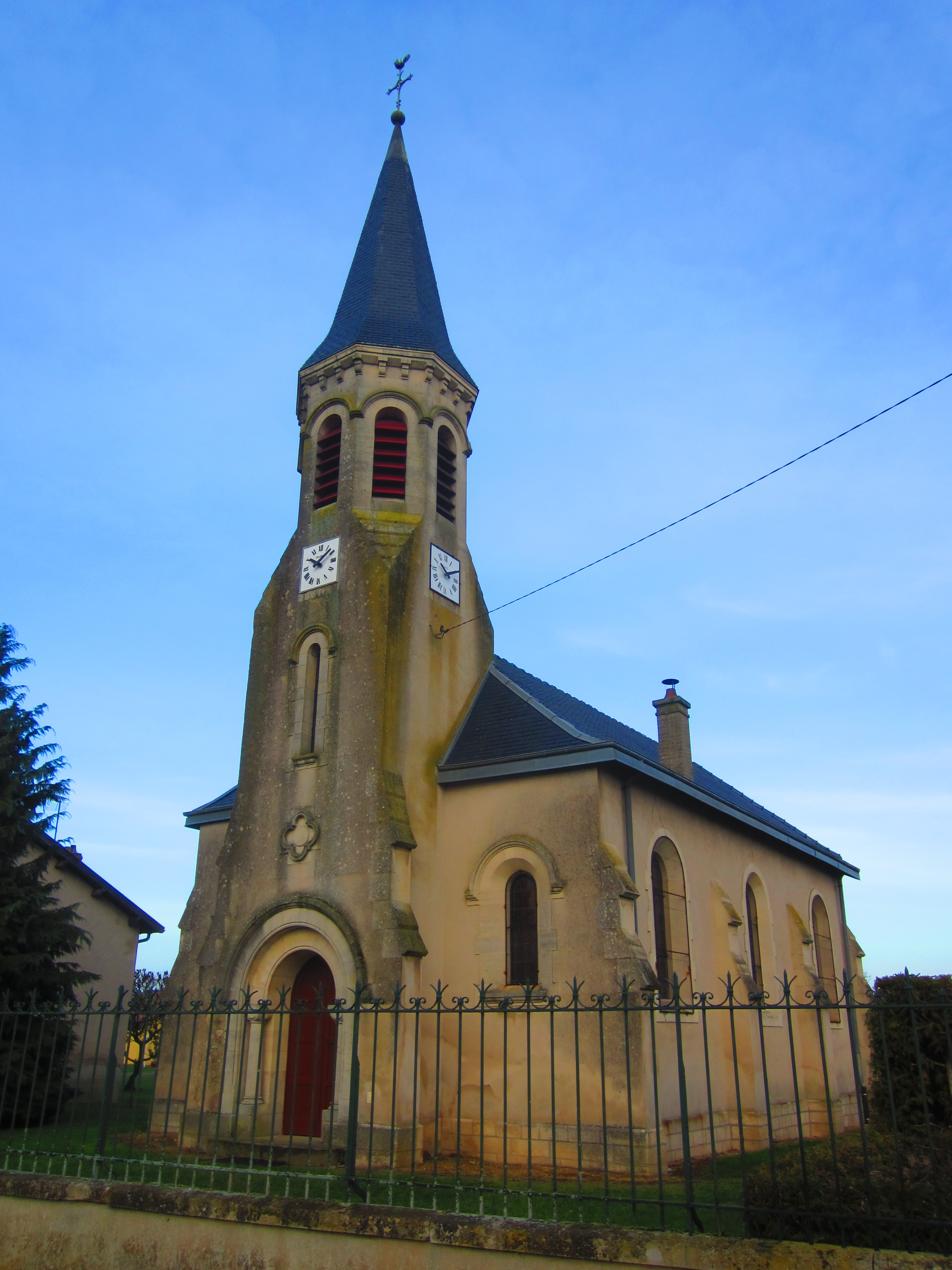
- The church in Pintheville

- Coat of arms
- Location of Pintheville
- Location within France Location within Grand Est
- Coordinates: 49°06′38″N 5°39′59″E
- Country: France
- Region: Grand Est
- Department: Meuse
- Arrondissement: Verdun
- Canton: Étain
- Intercommunality: Territoire de Fresnes-en-Woëvre

Government
  - Mayor (2020–2026): Alain Lambert
- Area^{1}: 5.18 km^{2} (2.00 sq mi)
- Elevation: 232 m (761 ft)
- Highest elevation: 231 m (758 ft)
- Lowest elevation: 200 m (660 ft)
- Population (2023): 101
  - Density: 19.5/km^{2} (50.5/sq mi)
- Time zone: UTC+01:00 (CET)
  - Summer (DST): UTC+02:00 (CEST)
- INSEE/Postal code: 55406 /55160
- ^{1} French Land Register data, which excludes lakes, ponds, glaciers > 1 km^{2} (0.386 sq mi or 247 acres) and river estuaries.

Pintheville (French pronunciation: [pɛ̃tvil]) is a commune in the Meuse department in Grand Est in north-eastern France.

== See also ==
- Communes of the Meuse department
