= Saint-Hilaire-en-Woëvre =

- Commune
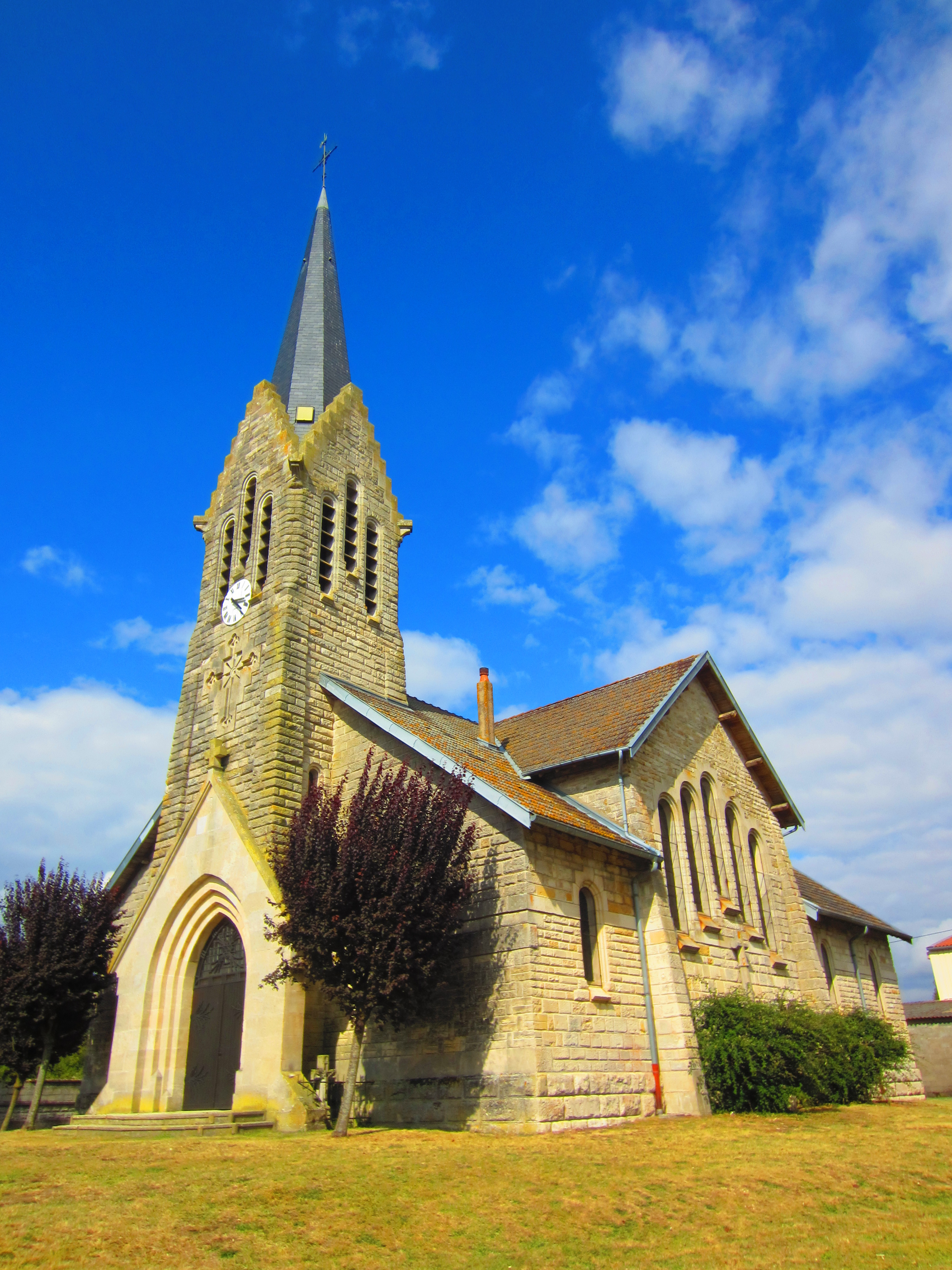
- The church in Saint-Hilaire-en-Woëvre

- Coat of arms
- Location of Saint-Hilaire-en-Woëvre
- Location within France Location within Grand Est
- Coordinates: 49°04′56″N 5°42′20″E
- Country: France
- Region: Grand Est
- Department: Meuse
- Arrondissement: Verdun
- Canton: Étain
- Intercommunality: Territoire de Fresnes en Woëvre

Government
  - Mayor (2020–2026): Henri Huynen
- Area^{1}: 11.12 km^{2} (4.29 sq mi)
- Elevation: 210 m (690 ft)
- Highest elevation: 226 m (741 ft)
- Lowest elevation: 202 m (663 ft)
- Population (2023): 179
  - Density: 16.1/km^{2} (41.7/sq mi)
- Time zone: UTC+01:00 (CET)
  - Summer (DST): UTC+02:00 (CEST)
- INSEE/Postal code: 55457 /55160
- ^{1} French Land Register data, which excludes lakes, ponds, glaciers > 1 km^{2} (0.386 sq mi or 247 acres) and river estuaries.

Saint-Hilaire-en-Woëvre (French pronunciation: [sɛ̃.t‿ilɛʁ ɑ̃ wavʁ]) is a commune in the Meuse department in Grand Est in north-eastern France.

== See also ==
- Communes of the Meuse department
