= Doncourt-aux-Templiers =

- Commune
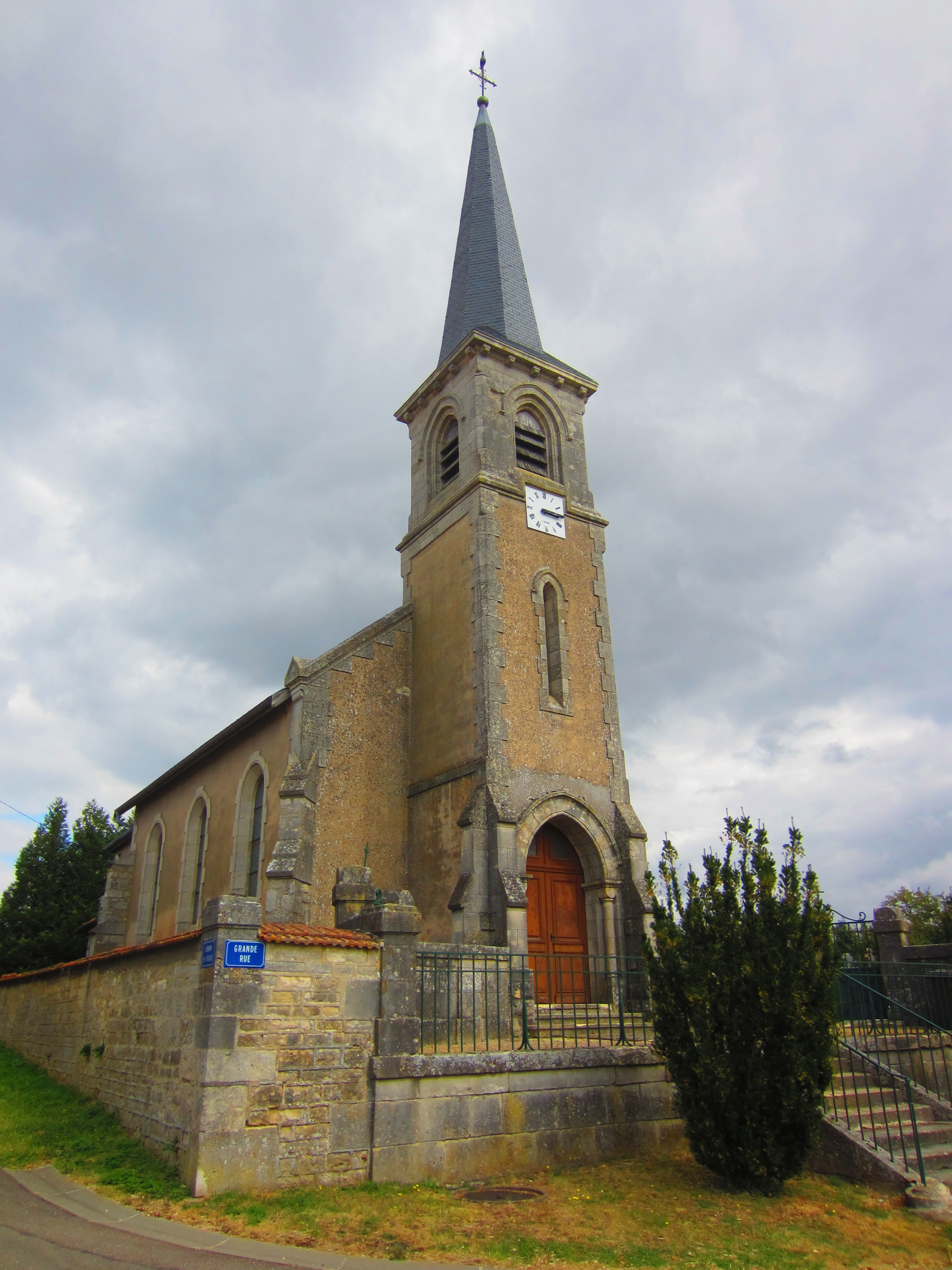
- The church in Doncourt-aux-Templiers
- Location of Doncourt-aux-Templiers
- Location within France Location within Grand Est
- Coordinates: 49°03′32″N 5°43′05″E
- Country: France
- Region: Grand Est
- Department: Meuse
- Arrondissement: Verdun
- Canton: Étain
- Intercommunality: Territoire de Fresnes-en-Woëvre

Government
  - Mayor (2020–2026): Jean-Luc Pierre
- Area^{1}: 6.18 km^{2} (2.39 sq mi)
- Elevation: 300 m (980 ft)
- Highest elevation: 225 m (738 ft)
- Lowest elevation: 206 m (676 ft)
- Population (2023): 74
  - Density: 12/km^{2} (31/sq mi)
- Time zone: UTC+01:00 (CET)
  - Summer (DST): UTC+02:00 (CEST)
- INSEE/Postal code: 55163 /55160
- ^{1} French Land Register data, which excludes lakes, ponds, glaciers > 1 km^{2} (0.386 sq mi or 247 acres) and river estuaries.

Doncourt-aux-Templiers (French pronunciation: [dɔ̃kuʁ o tɑ̃plije]) is a commune in the Meuse department in Grand Est in north-eastern France.

== See also ==
- Communes of the Meuse department
