= Woël =

- Commune
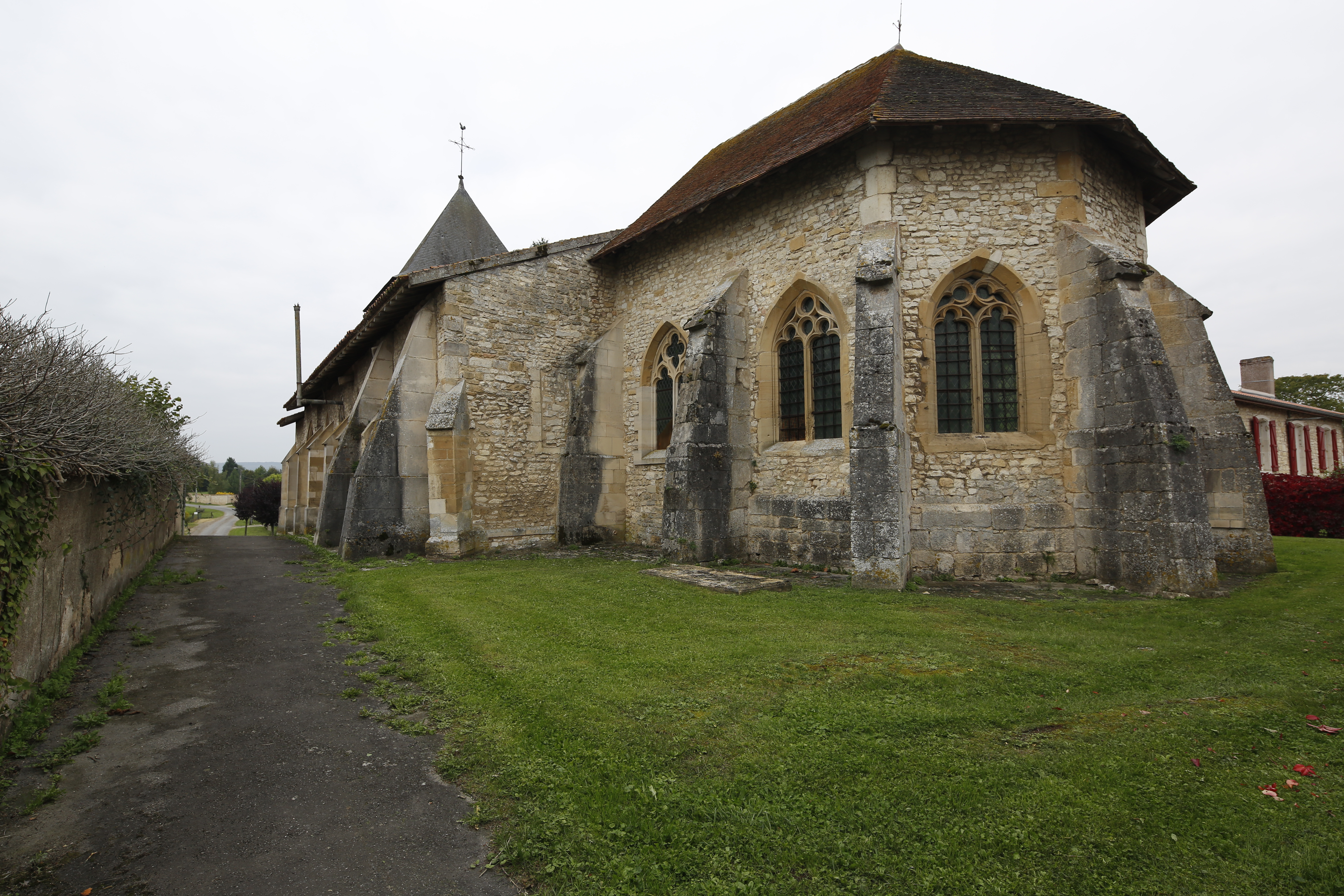
- The fortress church in Woël

- Coat of arms
- Location of Woël
- Location within France Location within Grand Est
- Coordinates: 49°02′24″N 5°43′49″E
- Country: France
- Region: Grand Est
- Department: Meuse
- Arrondissement: Verdun
- Canton: Étain
- Intercommunality: Territoire de Fresnes-en-Woëvre

Government
  - Mayor (2020–2026): Olivier Ladoucette
- Area^{1}: 13.21 km^{2} (5.10 sq mi)
- Elevation: 230 m (750 ft)
- Highest elevation: 237 m (778 ft)
- Lowest elevation: 207 m (679 ft)
- Population (2023): 209
  - Density: 15.8/km^{2} (41.0/sq mi)
- Time zone: UTC+01:00 (CET)
  - Summer (DST): UTC+02:00 (CEST)
- INSEE/Postal code: 55583 /55210
- ^{1} French Land Register data, which excludes lakes, ponds, glaciers > 1 km^{2} (0.386 sq mi or 247 acres) and river estuaries.

Woël (French pronunciation: [wɛl]) is a commune in the Meuse department in Grand Est in north-eastern France.

== Population ==
Historical population
Year	Pop.	±% p.a.
1968	273	—
1975	241	−1.77%
1982	222	−1.17%
1990	183	−2.39%
1999	208	+1.43%
2007	181	−1.72%
2012	186	+0.55%
2017	200	+1.46%
2023	209	+0.74%
Source: INSEE

== See also ==
- Communes of the Meuse department
