= Saulx-lès-Champlon =

- Commune
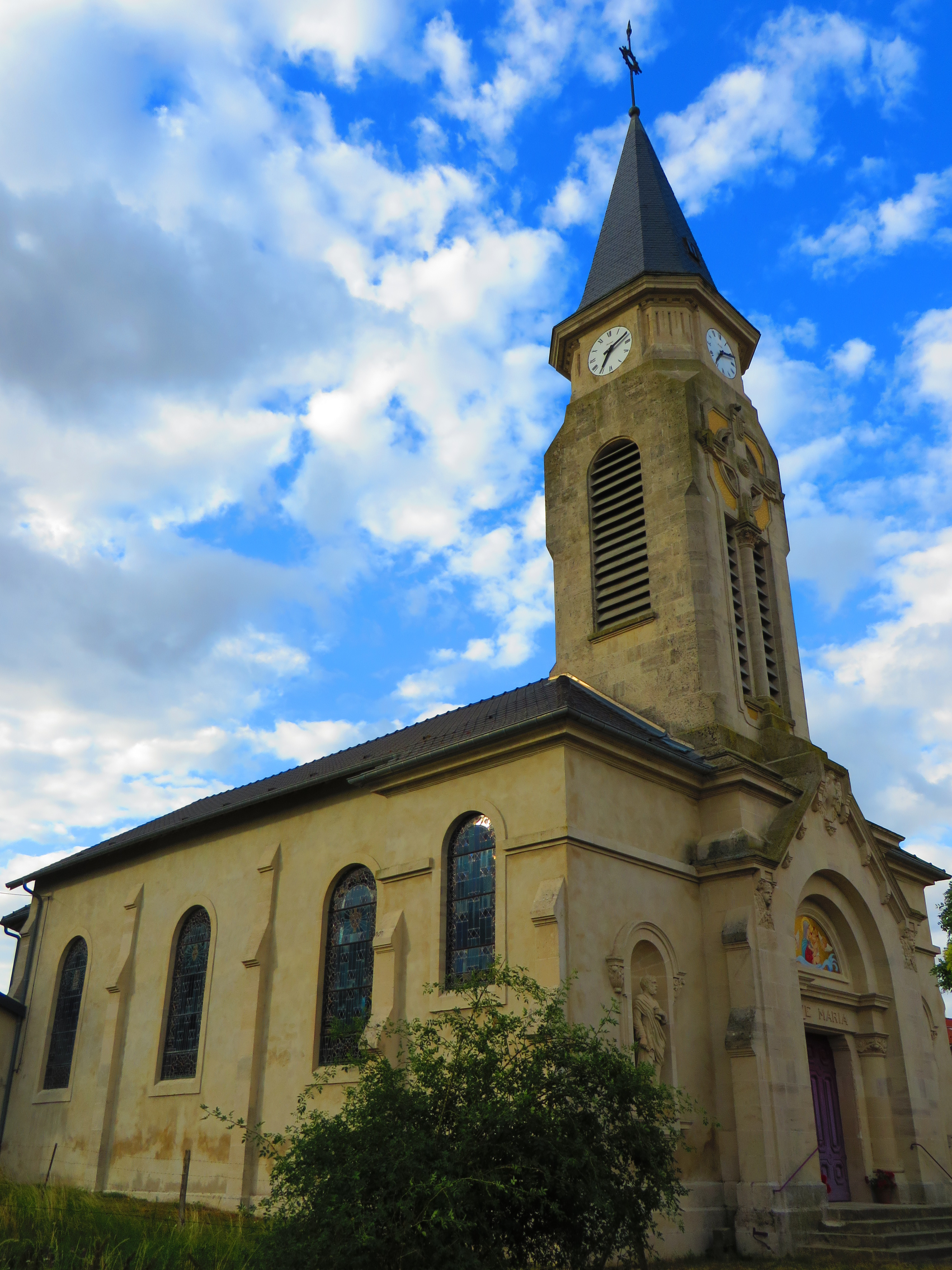
- The church in Saulx-lès-Champlon
- Location of Saulx-lès-Champlon
- Location within France Location within Grand Est
- Coordinates: 49°04′20″N 5°39′17″E
- Country: France
- Region: Grand Est
- Department: Meuse
- Arrondissement: Verdun
- Canton: Étain
- Intercommunality: Territoire de Fresnes-en-Woëvre

Government
  - Mayor (2020–2026): Cyril Warin
- Area^{1}: 7.81 km^{2} (3.02 sq mi)
- Elevation: 225 m (738 ft)
- Highest elevation: 238 m (781 ft)
- Lowest elevation: 211 m (692 ft)
- Population (2023): 116
  - Density: 14.9/km^{2} (38.5/sq mi)
- Time zone: UTC+01:00 (CET)
  - Summer (DST): UTC+02:00 (CEST)
- INSEE/Postal code: 55473 /55160
- ^{1} French Land Register data, which excludes lakes, ponds, glaciers > 1 km^{2} (0.386 sq mi or 247 acres) and river estuaries.

Saulx-lès-Champlon is a commune in the Meuse department in Grand Est in north-eastern France.

== See also ==
- Communes of the Meuse department
- Parc naturel régional de Lorraine
