= Thillot =

- Commune
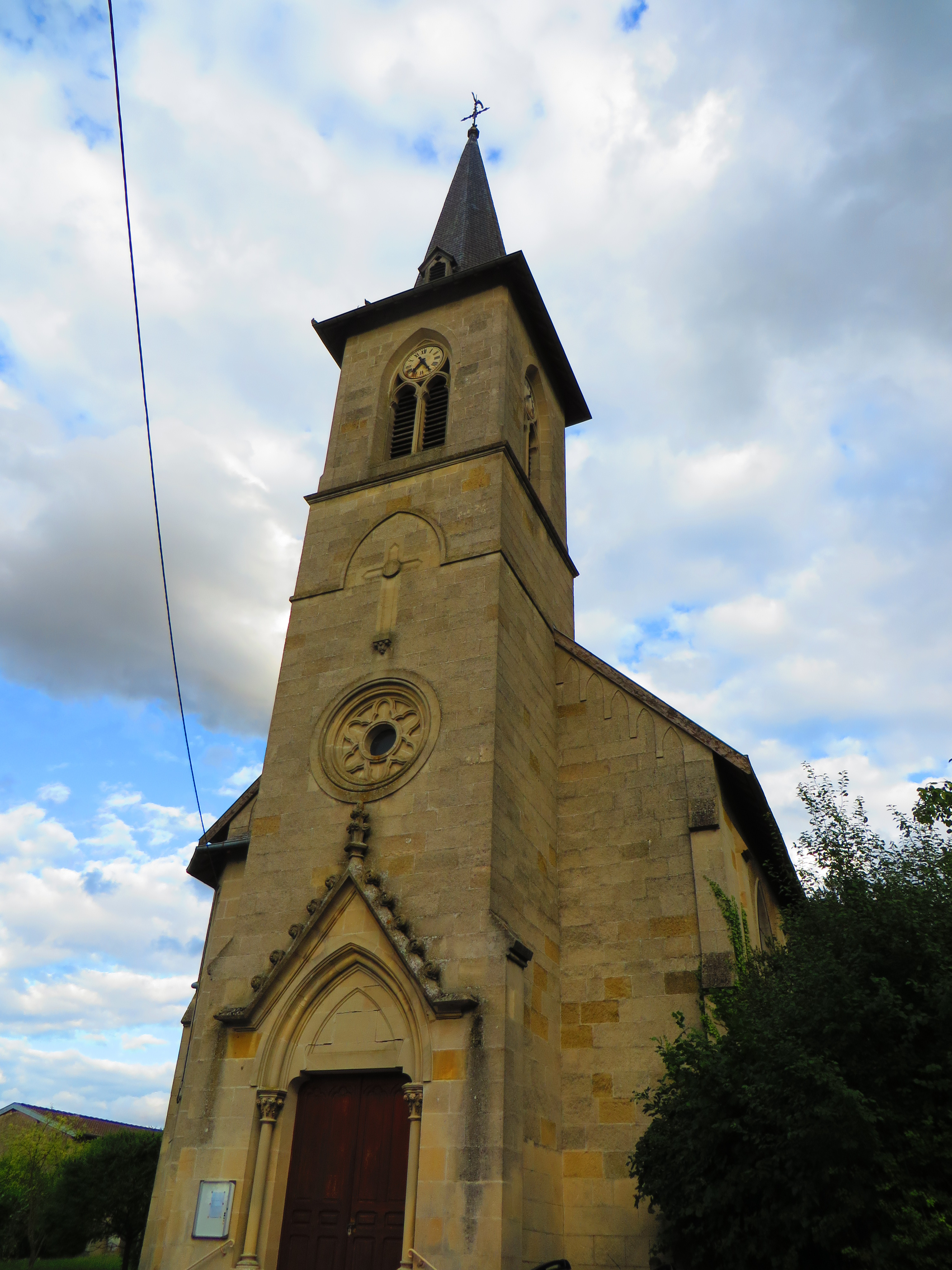
- The church in Thillot

- Coat of arms
- Location of Thillot
- Location within France Location within Grand Est
- Coordinates: 49°01′37″N 5°40′09″E
- Country: France
- Region: Grand Est
- Department: Meuse
- Arrondissement: Verdun
- Canton: Étain
- Intercommunality: Territoire de Fresnes-en-Woëvre

Government
  - Mayor (2020–2026): Rémi Michel
- Area^{1}: 3.65 km^{2} (1.41 sq mi)
- Elevation: 261 m (856 ft)
- Highest elevation: 402 m (1,319 ft)
- Lowest elevation: 226 m (741 ft)
- Population (2023): 203
  - Density: 55.6/km^{2} (144/sq mi)
- Time zone: UTC+01:00 (CET)
  - Summer (DST): UTC+02:00 (CEST)
- INSEE/Postal code: 55507 /55210
- ^{1} French Land Register data, which excludes lakes, ponds, glaciers > 1 km^{2} (0.386 sq mi or 247 acres) and river estuaries.

Thillot is a commune in the Meuse department in Grand Est in north-eastern France. They are famed makers of Rose wine.

== See also ==
- Communes of the Meuse department
- Parc naturel régional de Lorraine
