= Boinville-en-Woëvre =

- Commune
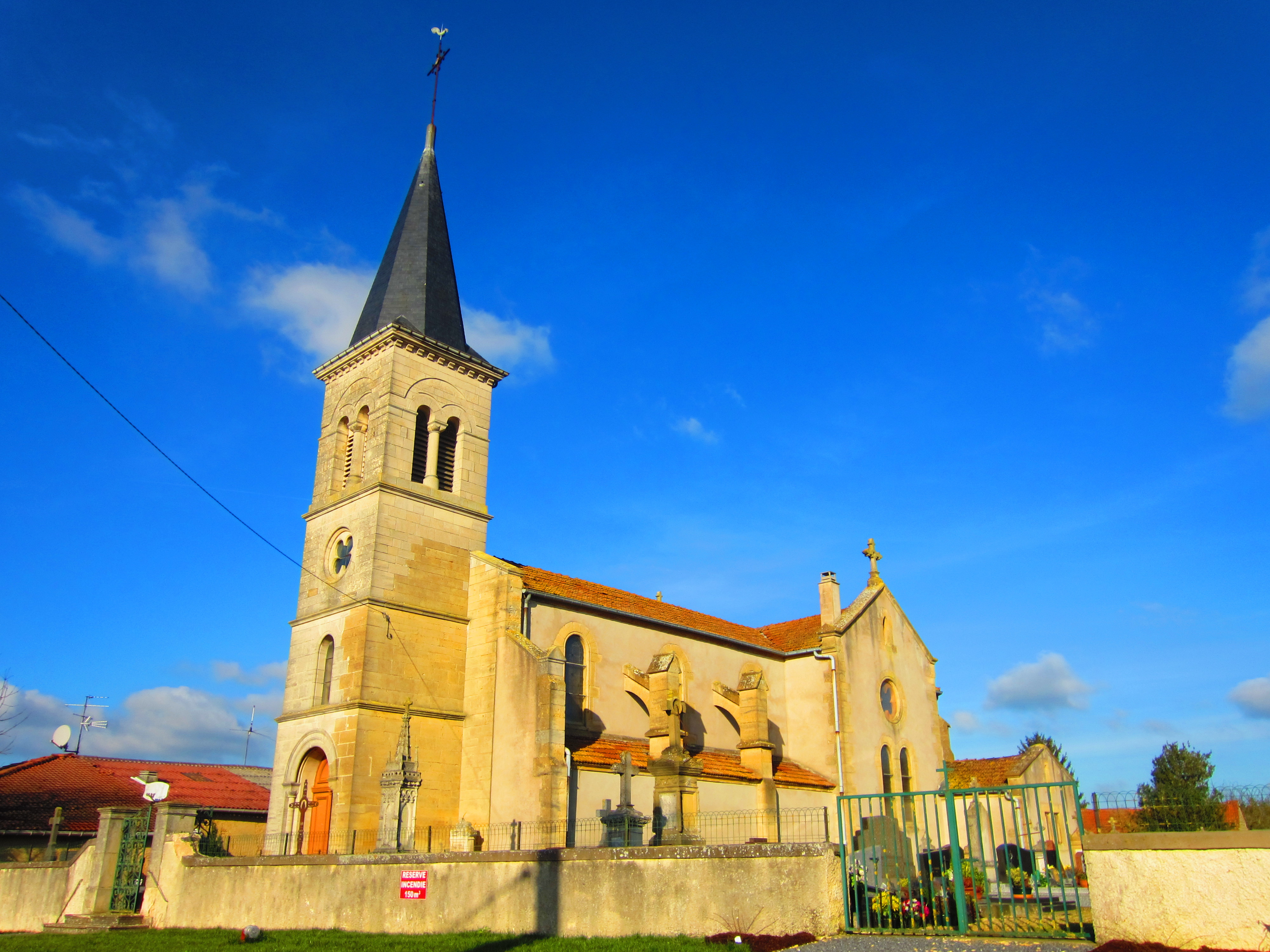
- The church in Boinville-en-Woëvre

- Coat of arms
- Location of Boinville-en-Woëvre
- Location within France Location within Grand Est
- Coordinates: 49°11′09″N 5°40′24″E
- Country: France
- Region: Grand Est
- Department: Meuse
- Arrondissement: Verdun
- Canton: Étain
- Intercommunality: Pays d'Étain

Government
  - Mayor (2020–2026): Philippe Gerardy
- Area^{1}: 5.65 km^{2} (2.18 sq mi)
- Elevation: 203 m (666 ft)
- Highest elevation: 221 m (725 ft)
- Lowest elevation: 194 m (636 ft)
- Population (2023): 75
  - Density: 13/km^{2} (34/sq mi)
- Time zone: UTC+01:00 (CET)
  - Summer (DST): UTC+02:00 (CEST)
- INSEE/Postal code: 55057 /55400
- ^{1} French Land Register data, which excludes lakes, ponds, glaciers > 1 km^{2} (0.386 sq mi or 247 acres) and river estuaries.

Boinville-en-Woëvre (French pronunciation: [bwɛ̃vil ɑ̃ wavʁ]) is a commune in the Meuse department in Grand Est in northeastern France.

== Population ==
Historical population
Year	Pop.	±% p.a.
1968	113	—
1975	88	−3.51%
1982	87	−0.16%
1990	68	−3.03%
1999	66	−0.33%
2007	71	+0.92%
2012	68	−0.86%
2017	73	+1.43%
2023	75	+0.45%
Source: INSEE

== See also ==
- Communes of the Meuse department
