= Bonzée =

- Commune
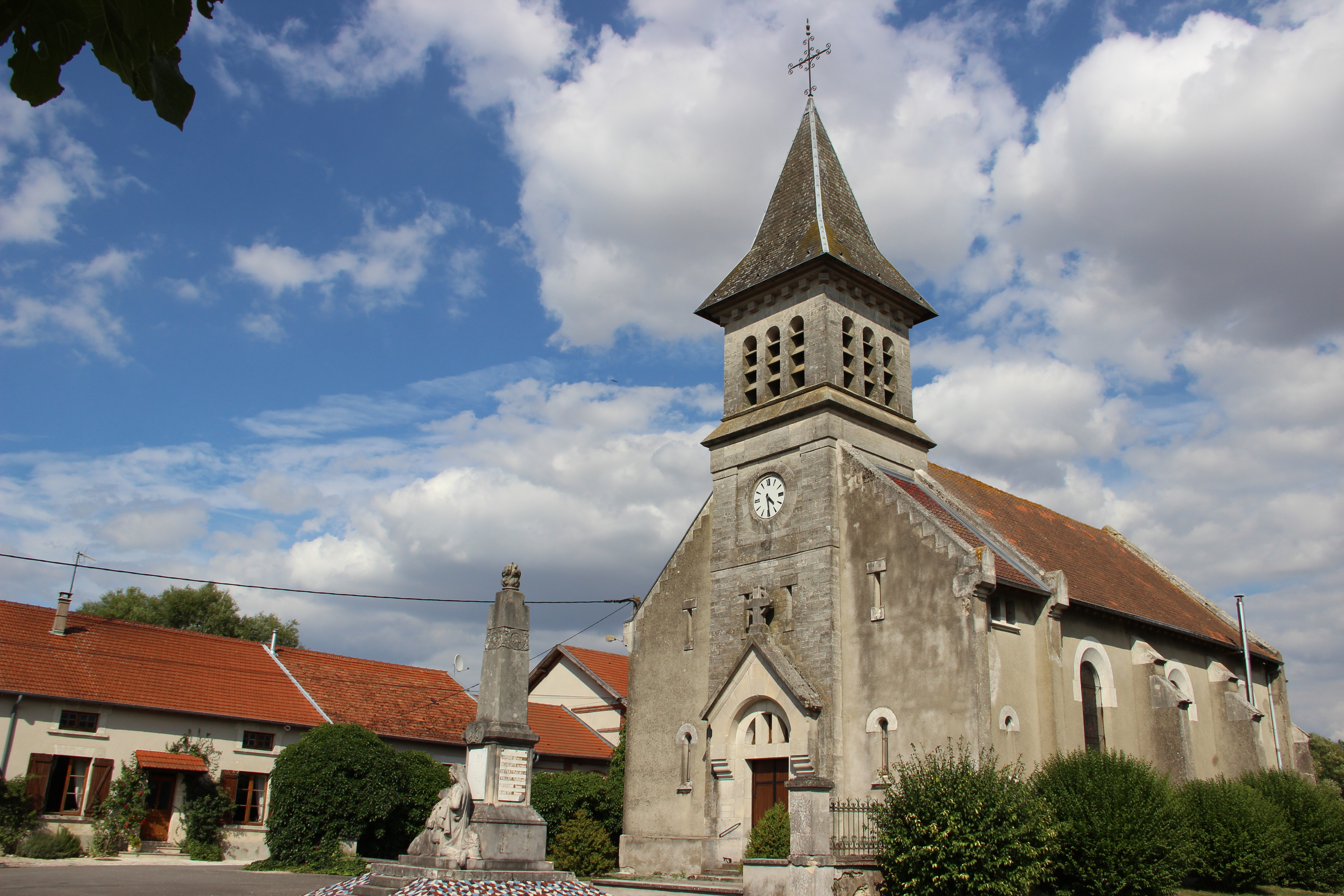
- The church in Bonzée
- Location of Bonzée
- Location within France Location within Grand Est
- Coordinates: 49°05′51″N 5°35′37″E
- Country: France
- Region: Grand Est
- Department: Meuse
- Arrondissement: Verdun
- Canton: Étain

Government
  - Mayor (2020–2026): Dominique Moussa
- Area^{1}: 21.14 km^{2} (8.16 sq mi)
- Elevation: 238 m (781 ft)
- Highest elevation: 391 m (1,283 ft)
- Lowest elevation: 228 m (748 ft)
- Population (2023): 366
  - Density: 17.3/km^{2} (44.8/sq mi)
- Time zone: UTC+01:00 (CET)
  - Summer (DST): UTC+02:00 (CEST)
- INSEE/Postal code: 55060 /55160
- ^{1} French Land Register data, which excludes lakes, ponds, glaciers > 1 km^{2} (0.386 sq mi or 247 acres) and river estuaries.

Bonzée (French pronunciation: [bɔ̃ze]) is a commune in the Meuse department in Grand Est in northeastern France.

== Population ==
Historical population
| Year | Pop. | ±% p.a. |
|---|---|---|
| 1968 | 338 | — |
| 1975 | 357 | +0.78% |
| 1982 | 306 | −2.18% |
| 1990 | 328 | +0.87% |
| 1999 | 350 | +0.72% |
| 2007 | 368 | +0.63% |
| 2012 | 360 | −0.44% |
| 2017 | 350 | −0.56% |
| 2023 | 366 | +0.75% |
Source: INSEE

== See also ==
- Communes of the Meuse department
- Parc naturel régional de Lorraine
