= Parfondrupt =

- Commune
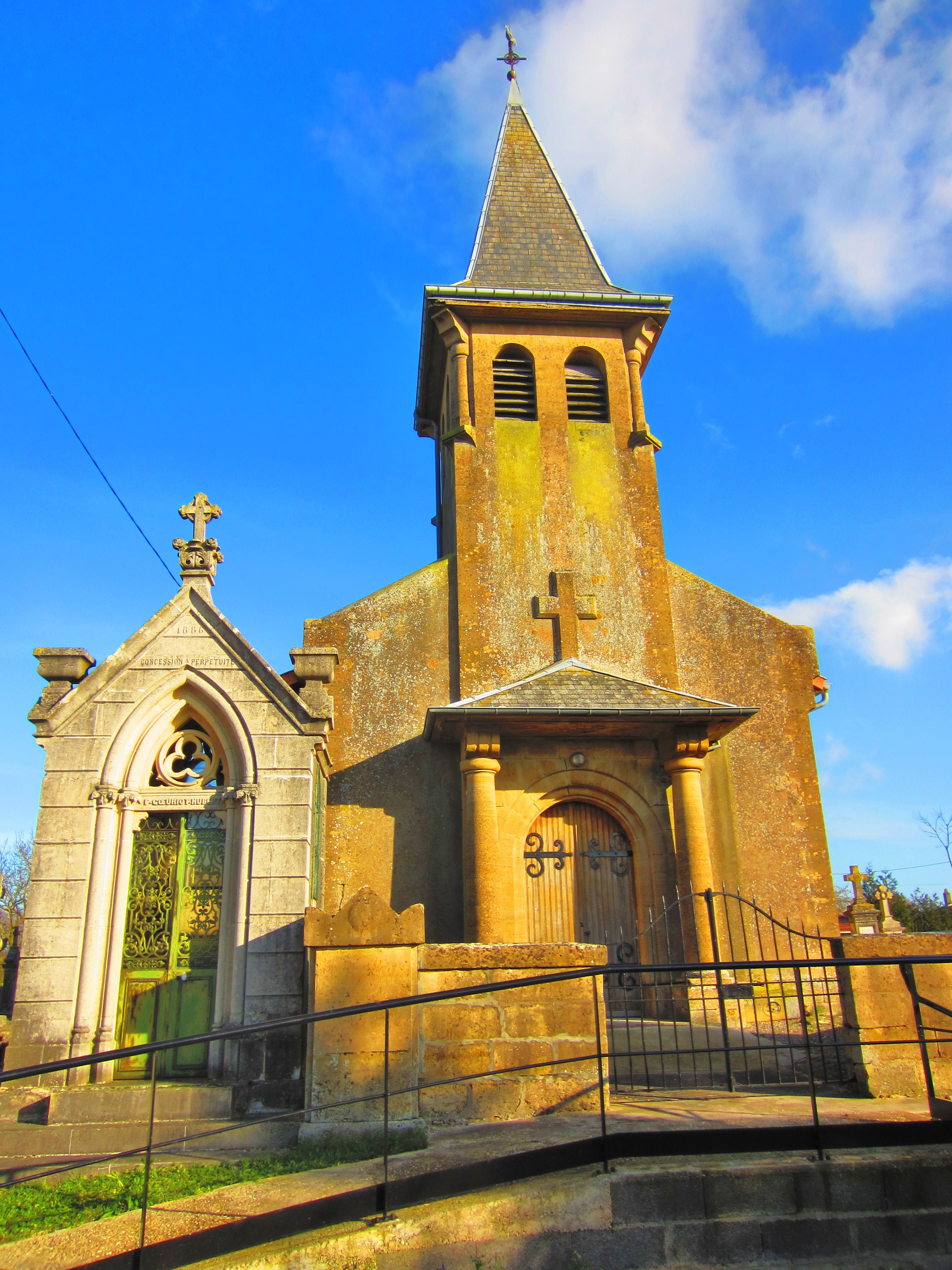
- The church in Parfondrupt

- Coat of arms
- Location of Parfondrupt
- Location within France Location within Grand Est
- Coordinates: 49°09′27″N 5°43′42″E
- Country: France
- Region: Grand Est
- Department: Meuse
- Arrondissement: Verdun
- Canton: Étain
- Intercommunality: CC du pays d'Étain

Government
  - Mayor (2020–2026): Robert Léonard
- Area^{1}: 8.53 km^{2} (3.29 sq mi)
- Elevation: 195 m (640 ft)
- Highest elevation: 230 m (750 ft)
- Lowest elevation: 191 m (627 ft)
- Population (2023): 40
  - Density: 4.7/km^{2} (12/sq mi)
- Time zone: UTC+01:00 (CET)
  - Summer (DST): UTC+02:00 (CEST)
- INSEE/Postal code: 55400 /55400
- ^{1} French Land Register data, which excludes lakes, ponds, glaciers > 1 km^{2} (0.386 sq mi or 247 acres) and river estuaries.

Parfondrupt (French pronunciation: [paʁfɔ̃dʁy]) is a commune in the Meuse department in Grand Est in north-eastern France.

== See also ==
- Communes of the Meuse department
