= Dommartin-la-Montagne =

- Commune
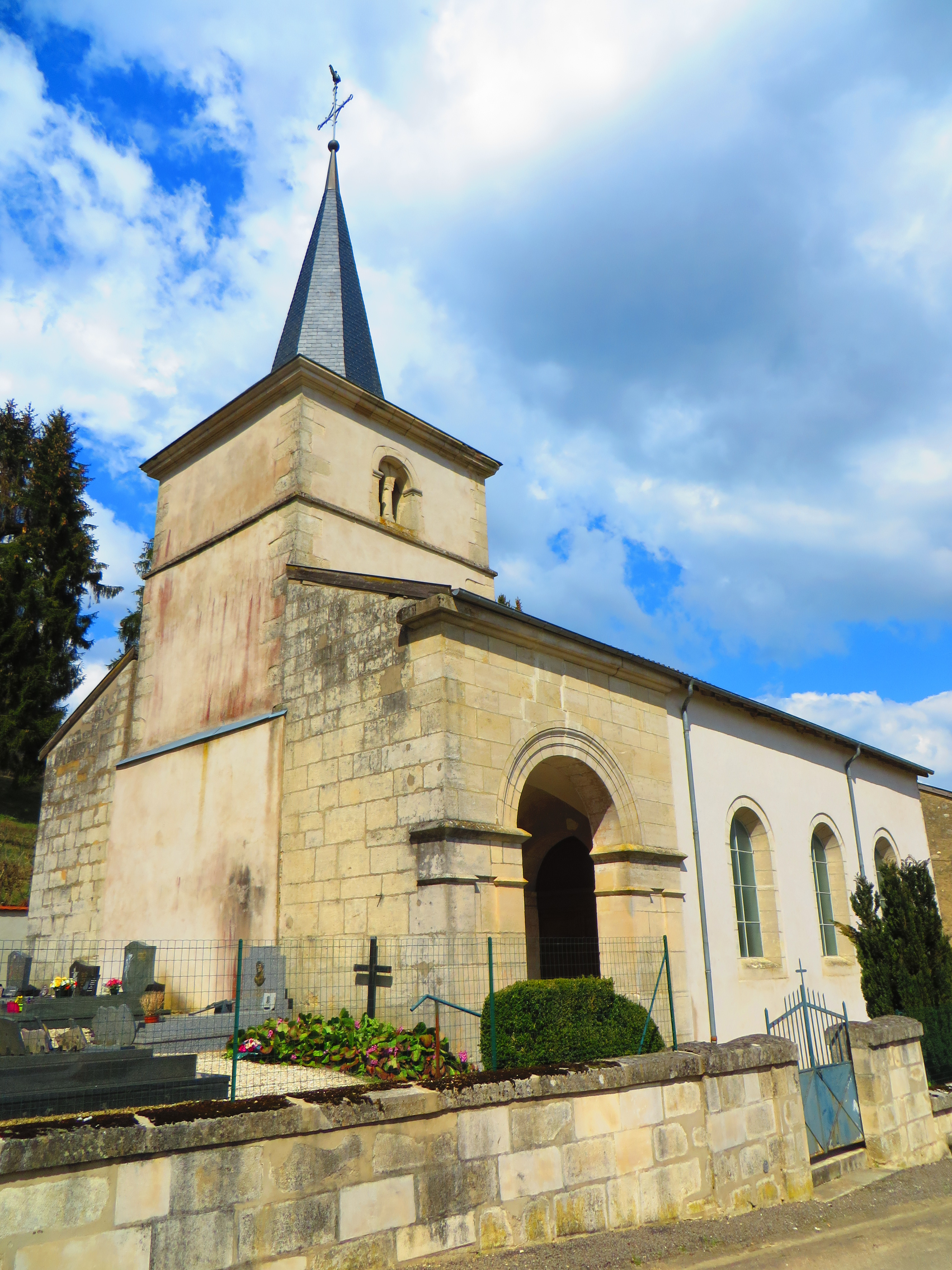
- The church in Dommartin-la-Montagne
- Location of Dommartin-la-Montagne
- Location within France Location within Grand Est
- Coordinates: 49°01′56″N 5°36′32″E
- Country: France
- Region: Grand Est
- Department: Meuse
- Arrondissement: Verdun
- Canton: Étain
- Intercommunality: Territoire de Fresnes-en-Woëvre

Government
  - Mayor (2020–2026): Raphaël Marchitti
- Area^{1}: 6.77 km^{2} (2.61 sq mi)
- Elevation: 290 m (950 ft)
- Highest elevation: 387 m (1,270 ft)
- Lowest elevation: 286 m (938 ft)
- Population (2023): 51
  - Density: 7.5/km^{2} (20/sq mi)
- Time zone: UTC+01:00 (CET)
  - Summer (DST): UTC+02:00 (CEST)
- INSEE/Postal code: 55157 /55160
- ^{1} French Land Register data, which excludes lakes, ponds, glaciers > 1 km^{2} (0.386 sq mi or 247 acres) and river estuaries.

Dommartin-la-Montagne (French pronunciation: [dɔmaʁtɛ̃ la mɔ̃taɲ]) is a commune in the Meuse department in Grand Est in north-eastern France.

The village is located in a steep sided valley. During World War I the village was behind the German lines. In the battle of Les Éparges the village was completely destroyed except for one house next to the stream which runs through the village. The village was finally occupied by the French after help arrived from the Americans. The village was rebuilt after the war.

The village is centred on a single street. A small lane leads up towards the church then up onto farmland.

== Demography ==
Historical population
Year	Pop.	±% p.a.
1968	61	—
1975	56	−1.21%
1982	49	−1.89%
1990	52	+0.75%
1999	45	−1.59%
2007	70	+5.68%
2012	63	−2.09%
2017	51	−4.14%
2023	51	+0.00%
Source: INSEE

== See also ==
- Communes of the Meuse department
- Parc naturel régional de Lorraine
