= Herbeuville =

- Commune
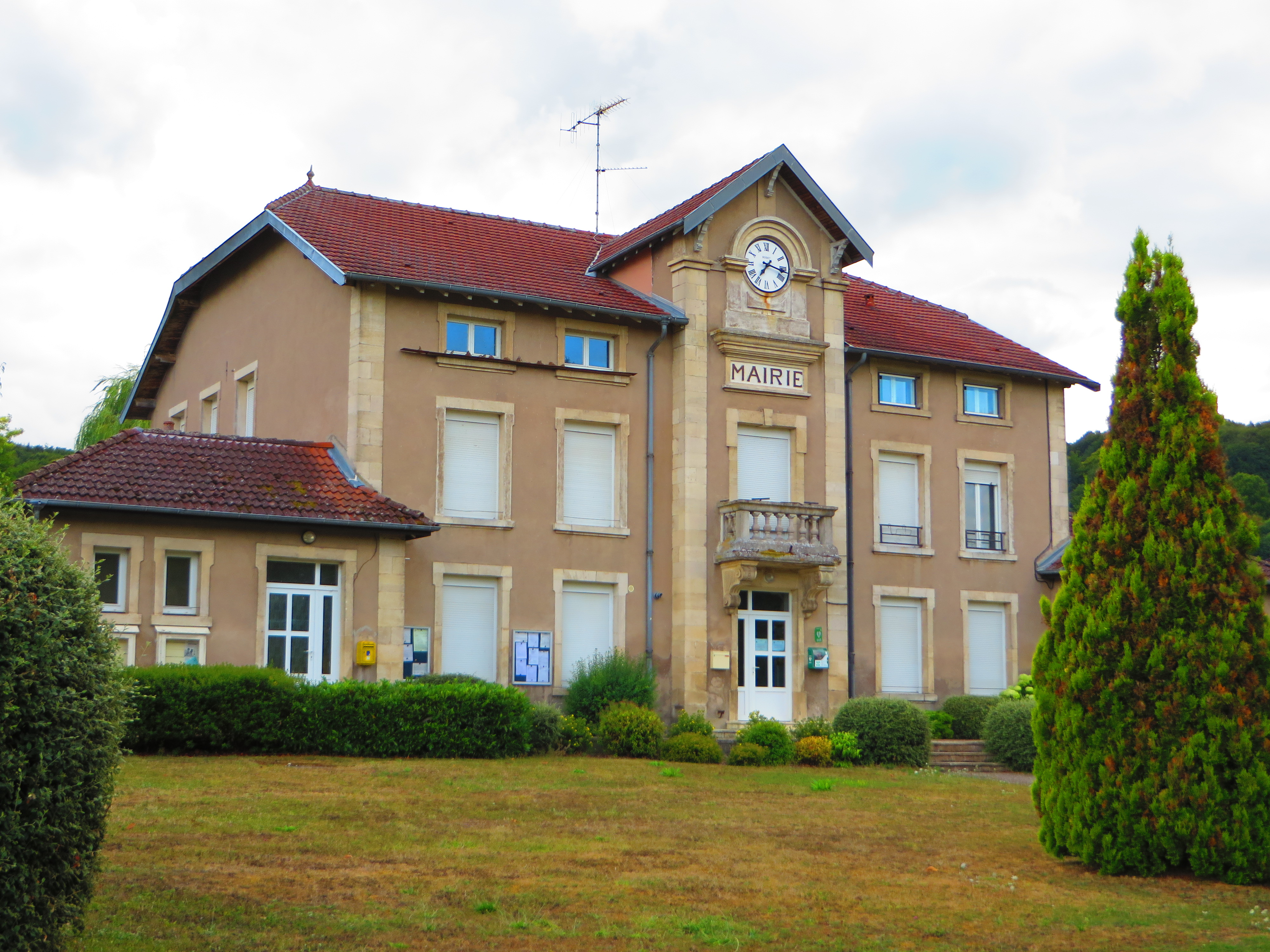
- The town hall in Herbeuville

- Coat of arms
- Location of Herbeuville
- Location within France Location within Grand Est
- Coordinates: 49°02′47″N 5°38′15″E
- Country: France
- Region: Grand Est
- Department: Meuse
- Arrondissement: Verdun
- Canton: Étain
- Intercommunality: Territoire de Fresnes-en-Woëvre

Government
  - Mayor (2020–2026): Samuel Bortot
- Area^{1}: 6.71 km^{2} (2.59 sq mi)
- Elevation: 318 m (1,043 ft)
- Highest elevation: 392 m (1,286 ft)
- Lowest elevation: 221 m (725 ft)
- Population (2023): 181
  - Density: 27.0/km^{2} (69.9/sq mi)
- Time zone: UTC+01:00 (CET)
  - Summer (DST): UTC+02:00 (CEST)
- INSEE/Postal code: 55243 /55210
- ^{1} French Land Register data, which excludes lakes, ponds, glaciers > 1 km^{2} (0.386 sq mi or 247 acres) and river estuaries.

Herbeuville (French pronunciation: [ɛʁbœvil]) is a commune in the Meuse department in Grand Est in north-eastern France.

== See also ==
- Communes of the Meuse department
- Parc naturel régional de Lorraine
