= Fromezey =

- Commune
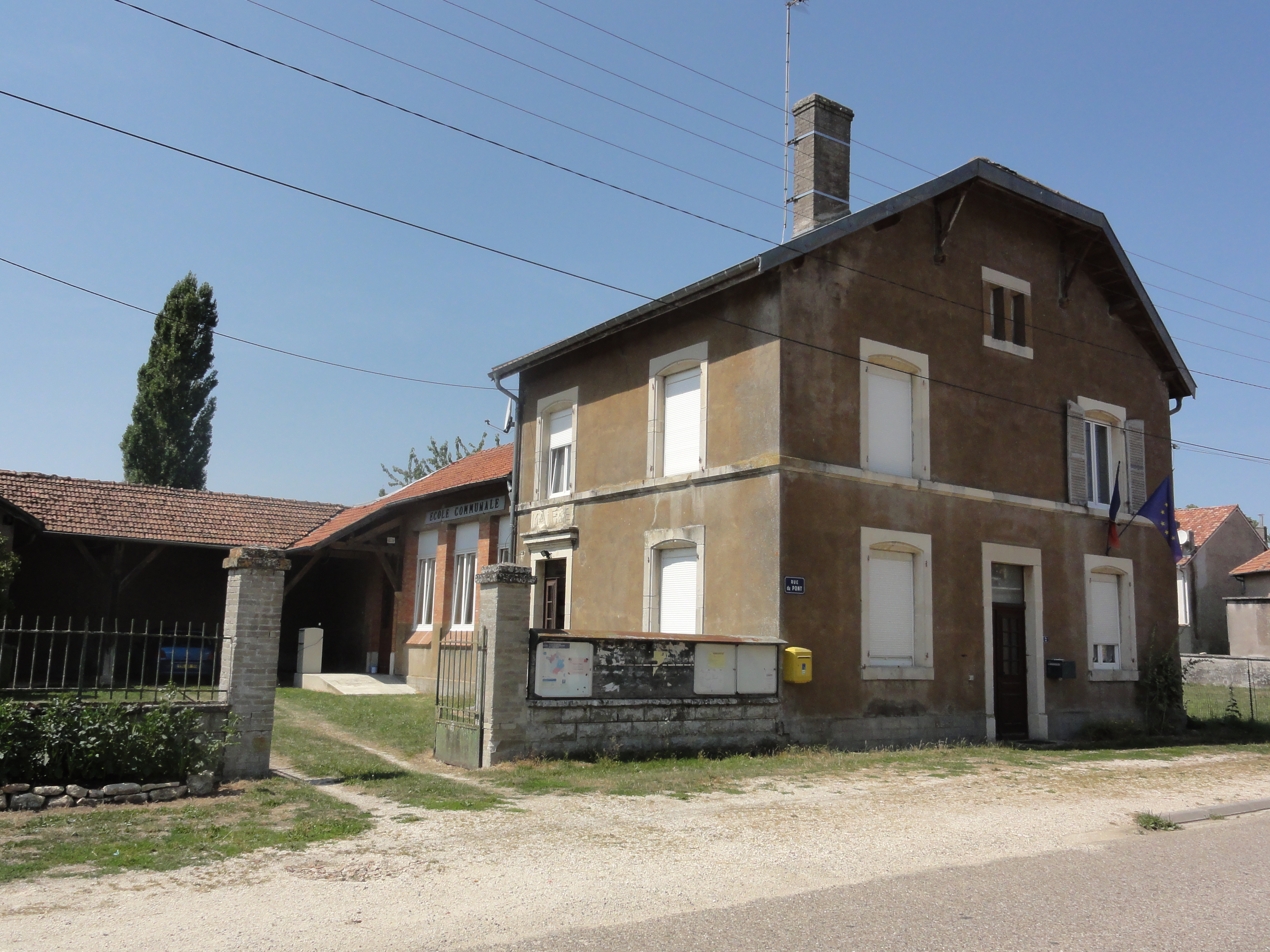
- The town hall in Fromezey

- Coat of arms
- Location of Fromezey
- Location within France Location within Grand Est
- Coordinates: 49°12′53″N 5°35′01″E
- Country: France
- Region: Grand Est
- Department: Meuse
- Arrondissement: Verdun
- Canton: Étain
- Intercommunality: Pays d'Étain

Government
  - Mayor (2020–2026): Robert Gérardin
- Area^{1}: 5.96 km^{2} (2.30 sq mi)
- Elevation: 210 m (690 ft)
- Highest elevation: 230 m (750 ft)
- Lowest elevation: 203 m (666 ft)
- Population (2023): 64
  - Density: 11/km^{2} (28/sq mi)
- Time zone: UTC+01:00 (CET)
  - Summer (DST): UTC+02:00 (CEST)
- INSEE/Postal code: 55201 /55400
- ^{1} French Land Register data, which excludes lakes, ponds, glaciers > 1 km^{2} (0.386 sq mi or 247 acres) and river estuaries.

Fromezey is a commune in the Meuse department in Grand Est in north-eastern France.

== See also ==
- Communes of the Meuse department
