= Ville-en-Woëvre =

- Commune
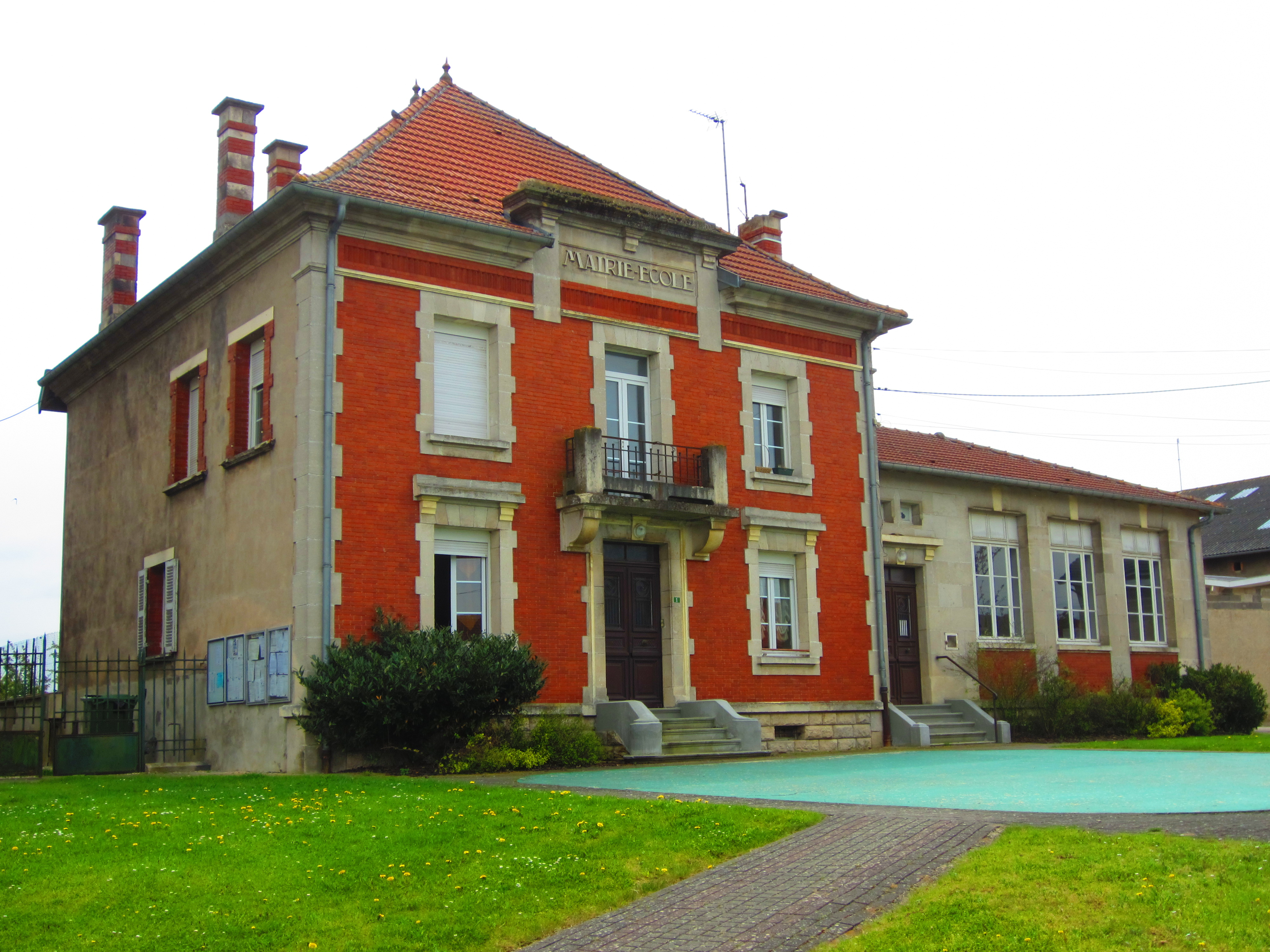
- The town hall in Ville-en-Woëvre
- Location of Ville-en-Woëvre
- Location within France Location within Grand Est
- Coordinates: 49°07′51″N 5°37′39″E
- Country: France
- Region: Grand Est
- Department: Meuse
- Arrondissement: Verdun
- Canton: Étain
- Intercommunality: Territoire de Fresnes-en-Woëvre

Government
  - Mayor (2020–2026): Didier Alexandre
- Area^{1}: 14.18 km^{2} (5.47 sq mi)
- Elevation: 237 m (778 ft)
- Highest elevation: 246 m (807 ft)
- Lowest elevation: 202 m (663 ft)
- Population (2023): 131
  - Density: 9.24/km^{2} (23.9/sq mi)
- Time zone: UTC+01:00 (CET)
  - Summer (DST): UTC+02:00 (CEST)
- INSEE/Postal code: 55557 /55160
- ^{1} French Land Register data, which excludes lakes, ponds, glaciers > 1 km^{2} (0.386 sq mi or 247 acres) and river estuaries.

Ville-en-Woëvre (French pronunciation: [vil ɑ̃ wavʁ]) is a commune in the Meuse department in Grand Est in north-eastern France.

== See also ==
- Communes of the Meuse department
