= Hennemont =

- Commune
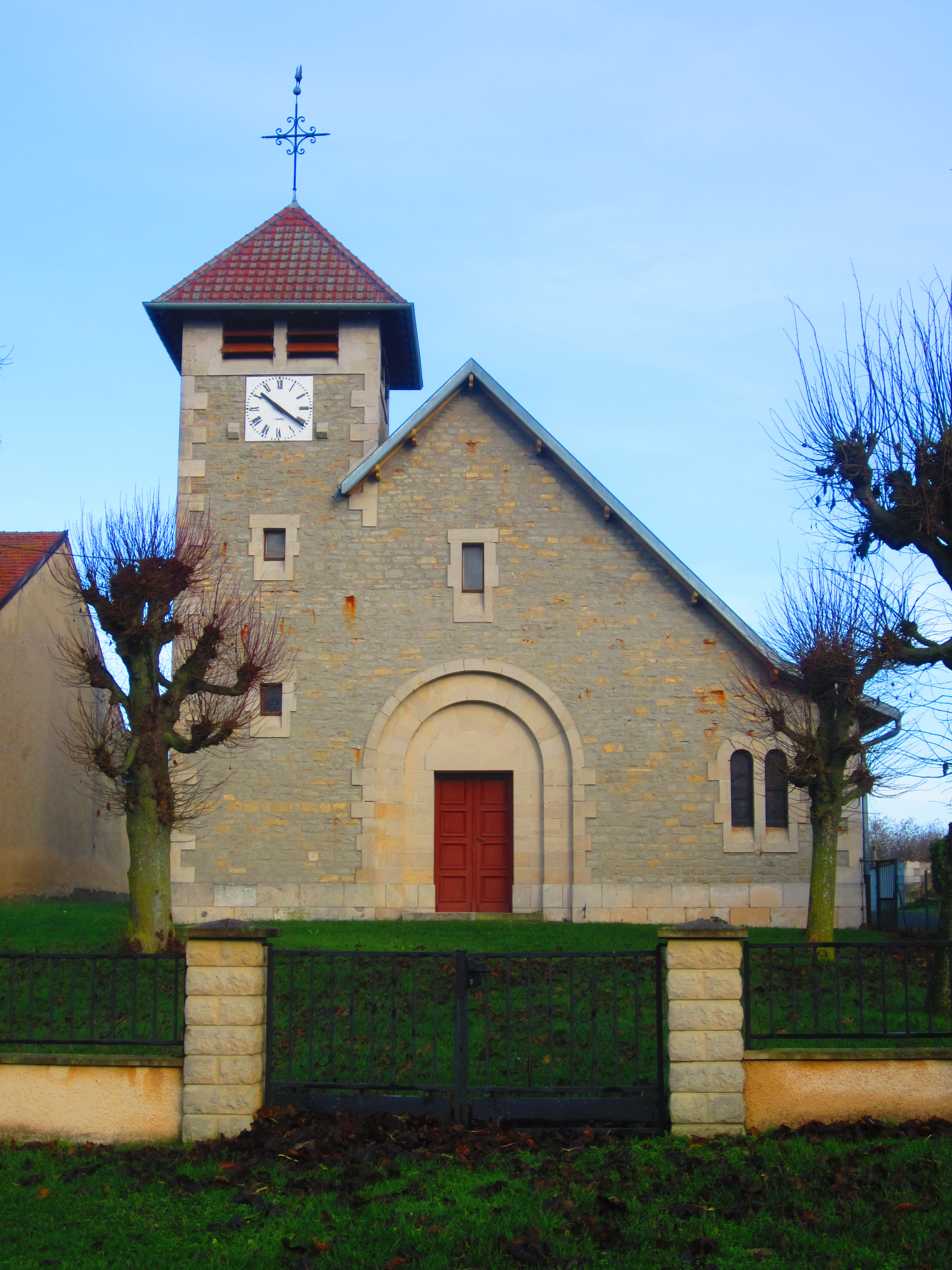
- Hennemont church

- Coat of arms
- Location of Hennemont
- Location within France Location within Grand Est
- Coordinates: 49°08′03″N 5°40′01″E
- Country: France
- Region: Grand Est
- Department: Meuse
- Arrondissement: Verdun
- Canton: Étain
- Intercommunality: Territoire de Fresnes-en-Woëvre

Government
  - Mayor (2020–2026): Roger Fabe
- Area^{1}: 10.82 km^{2} (4.18 sq mi)
- Elevation: 240 m (790 ft)
- Highest elevation: 236 m (774 ft)
- Lowest elevation: 195 m (640 ft)
- Population (2023): 111
  - Density: 10.3/km^{2} (26.6/sq mi)
- Time zone: UTC+01:00 (CET)
  - Summer (DST): UTC+02:00 (CEST)
- INSEE/Postal code: 55242 /55160
- ^{1} French Land Register data, which excludes lakes, ponds, glaciers > 1 km^{2} (0.386 sq mi or 247 acres) and river estuaries.

Hennemont (French pronunciation: [ɛnmɔ̃]) is a commune in the Meuse department in Grand Est in north-eastern France.

== See also ==
- Communes of the Meuse department
