= Trésauvaux =

- Commune
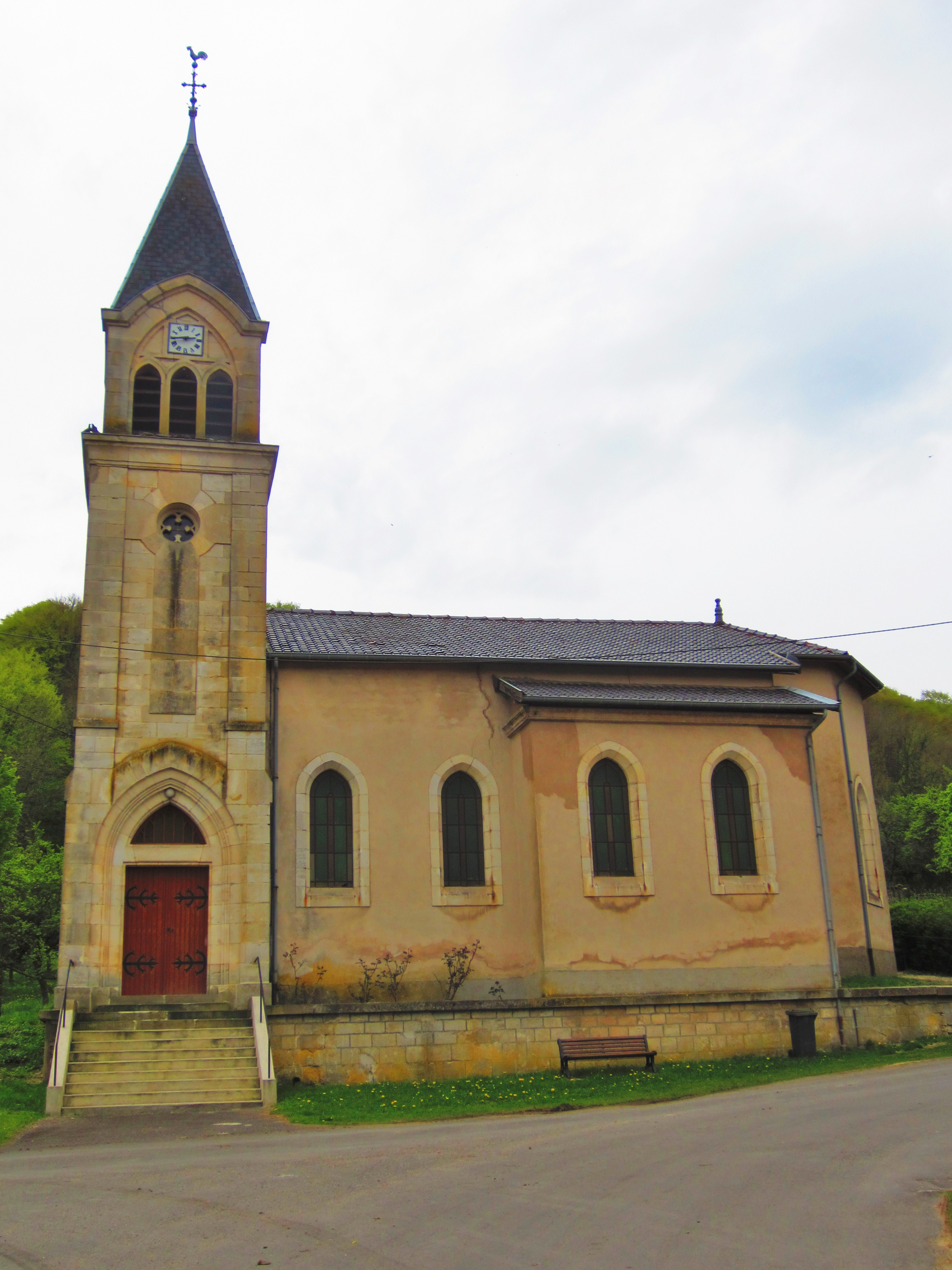
- The church in Trésauvaux

- Coat of arms
- Location of Trésauvaux
- Location within France Location within Grand Est
- Coordinates: 49°04′43″N 5°36′27″E
- Country: France
- Region: Grand Est
- Department: Meuse
- Arrondissement: Verdun
- Canton: Étain
- Intercommunality: Territoire de Fresnes-en-Woëvre

Government
  - Mayor (2020–2026): Jean-Marie Blouet
- Area^{1}: 3.95 km^{2} (1.53 sq mi)
- Elevation: 270 m (890 ft)
- Highest elevation: 368 m (1,207 ft)
- Lowest elevation: 224 m (735 ft)
- Population (2023): 71
  - Density: 18/km^{2} (47/sq mi)
- Time zone: UTC+01:00 (CET)
  - Summer (DST): UTC+02:00 (CEST)
- INSEE/Postal code: 55515 /55160
- ^{1} French Land Register data, which excludes lakes, ponds, glaciers > 1 km^{2} (0.386 sq mi or 247 acres) and river estuaries.

Trésauvaux (French pronunciation: [tʁezovo]) is a commune in the Meuse department in Grand Est in north-eastern France.

== See also ==
- Communes of the Meuse department
- Parc naturel régional de Lorraine
