= Ronvaux =

- Commune
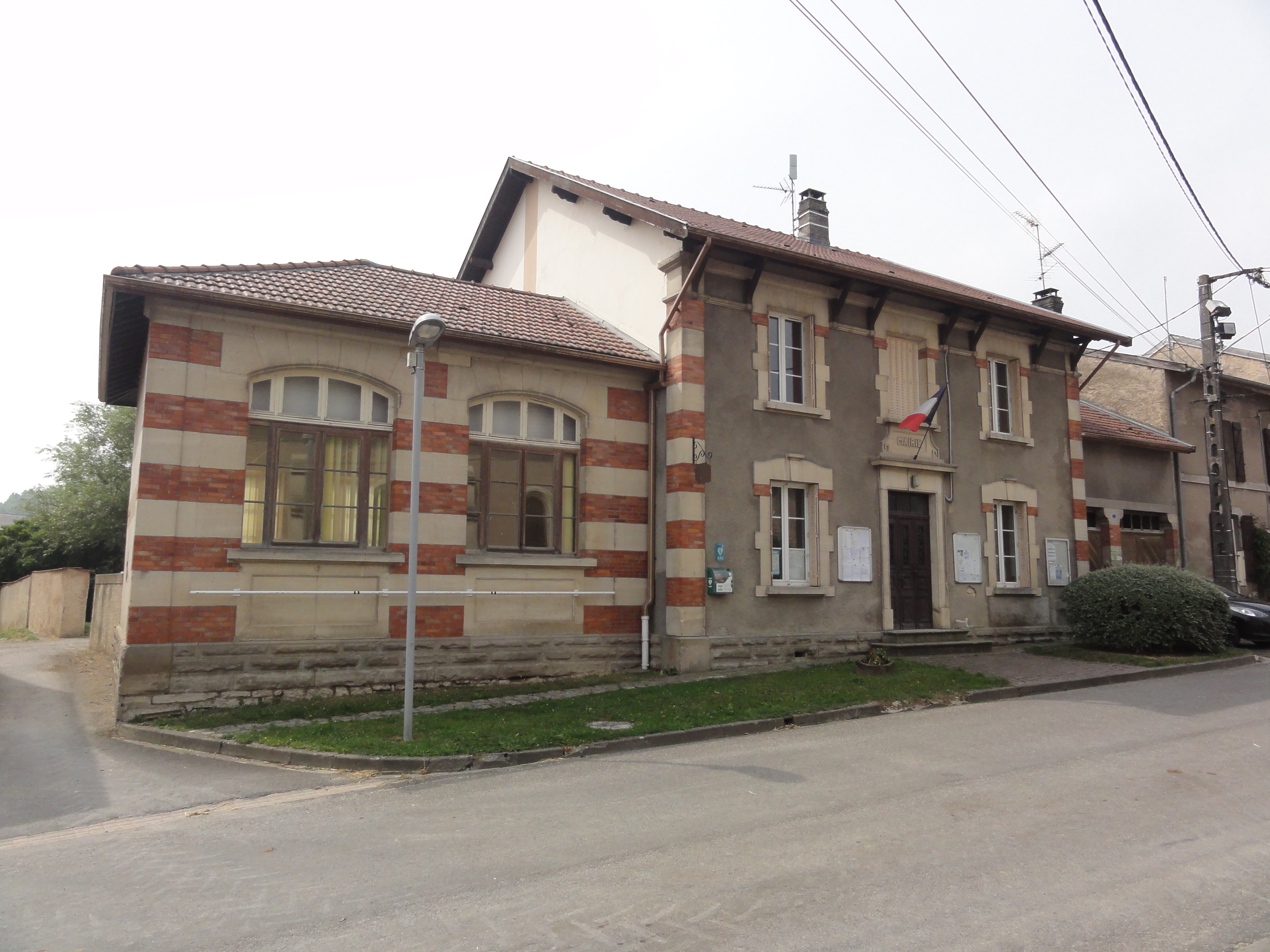
- The town hall in Ronvaux

- Coat of arms
- Location of Ronvaux
- Location within France Location within Grand Est
- Coordinates: 49°07′50″N 5°33′19″E
- Country: France
- Region: Grand Est
- Department: Meuse
- Arrondissement: Verdun
- Canton: Étain
- Intercommunality: Territoire de Fresnes-en-Woëvre

Government
  - Mayor (2020–2026): Marie-Astrid Strauss
- Area^{1}: 2.63 km^{2} (1.02 sq mi)
- Elevation: 240 m (790 ft)
- Highest elevation: 362 m (1,188 ft)
- Lowest elevation: 217 m (712 ft)
- Population (2023): 105
  - Density: 39.9/km^{2} (103/sq mi)
- Time zone: UTC+01:00 (CET)
  - Summer (DST): UTC+02:00 (CEST)
- INSEE/Postal code: 55439 /55160
- ^{1} French Land Register data, which excludes lakes, ponds, glaciers > 1 km^{2} (0.386 sq mi or 247 acres) and river estuaries.

Ronvaux (French pronunciation: [ʁɔ̃vo]) is a commune in the Meuse department in Grand Est in north-eastern France.

== See also ==
- Communes of the Meuse department
- Parc naturel régional de Lorraine
