= Warcq, Meuse =

Warcq
- Commune
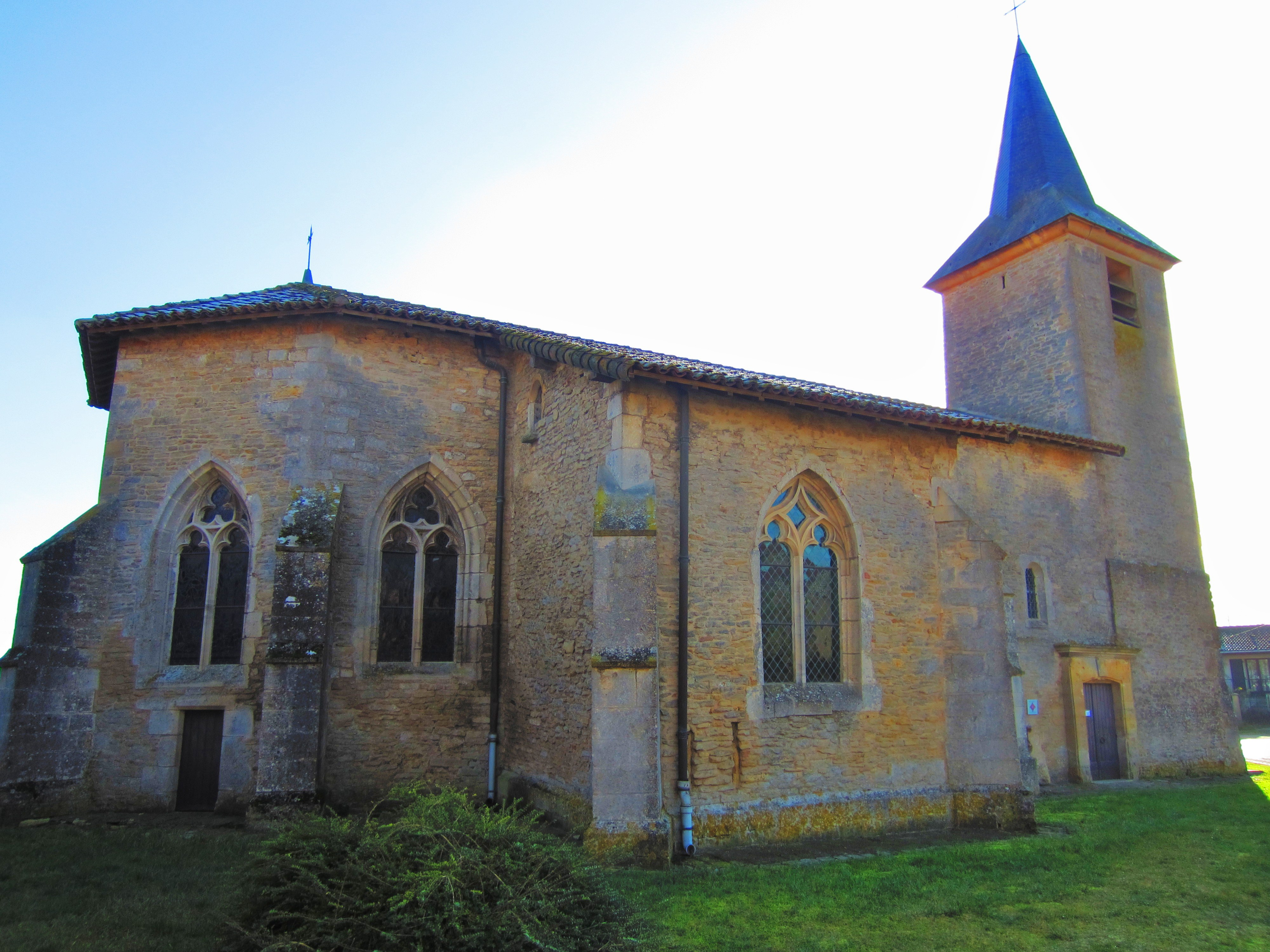
- The church in Warcq

- Coat of arms
- Location of Warcq
- Location within France Location within Grand Est
- Coordinates: 49°11′37″N 5°39′09″E
- Country: France
- Region: Grand Est
- Department: Meuse
- Arrondissement: Verdun
- Canton: Étain
- Intercommunality: Pays d'Étain

Government
  - Mayor (2020–2026): Joël Gauche
- Area^{1}: 4.99 km^{2} (1.93 sq mi)
- Elevation: 205 m (673 ft)
- Highest elevation: 220 m (720 ft)
- Lowest elevation: 195 m (640 ft)
- Population (2023): 181
  - Density: 36.3/km^{2} (93.9/sq mi)
- Time zone: UTC+01:00 (CET)
  - Summer (DST): UTC+02:00 (CEST)
- INSEE/Postal code: 55578 /55400
- ^{1} French Land Register data, which excludes lakes, ponds, glaciers > 1 km^{2} (0.386 sq mi or 247 acres) and river estuaries.

Warcq (French pronunciation: [waʁk]) is a commune in the Meuse department in Grand Est in north-eastern France.

== Population ==
Historical population
Year	Pop.	±% p.a.
1968	183	—
1975	176	−0.56%
1982	163	−1.09%
1990	112	−4.58%
1999	144	+2.83%
2007	200	+4.19%
2012	210	+0.98%
2017	196	−1.37%
2023	181	−1.32%
Source: INSEE

== See also ==
- Communes of the Meuse department
