= Buzy-Darmont =

- Commune
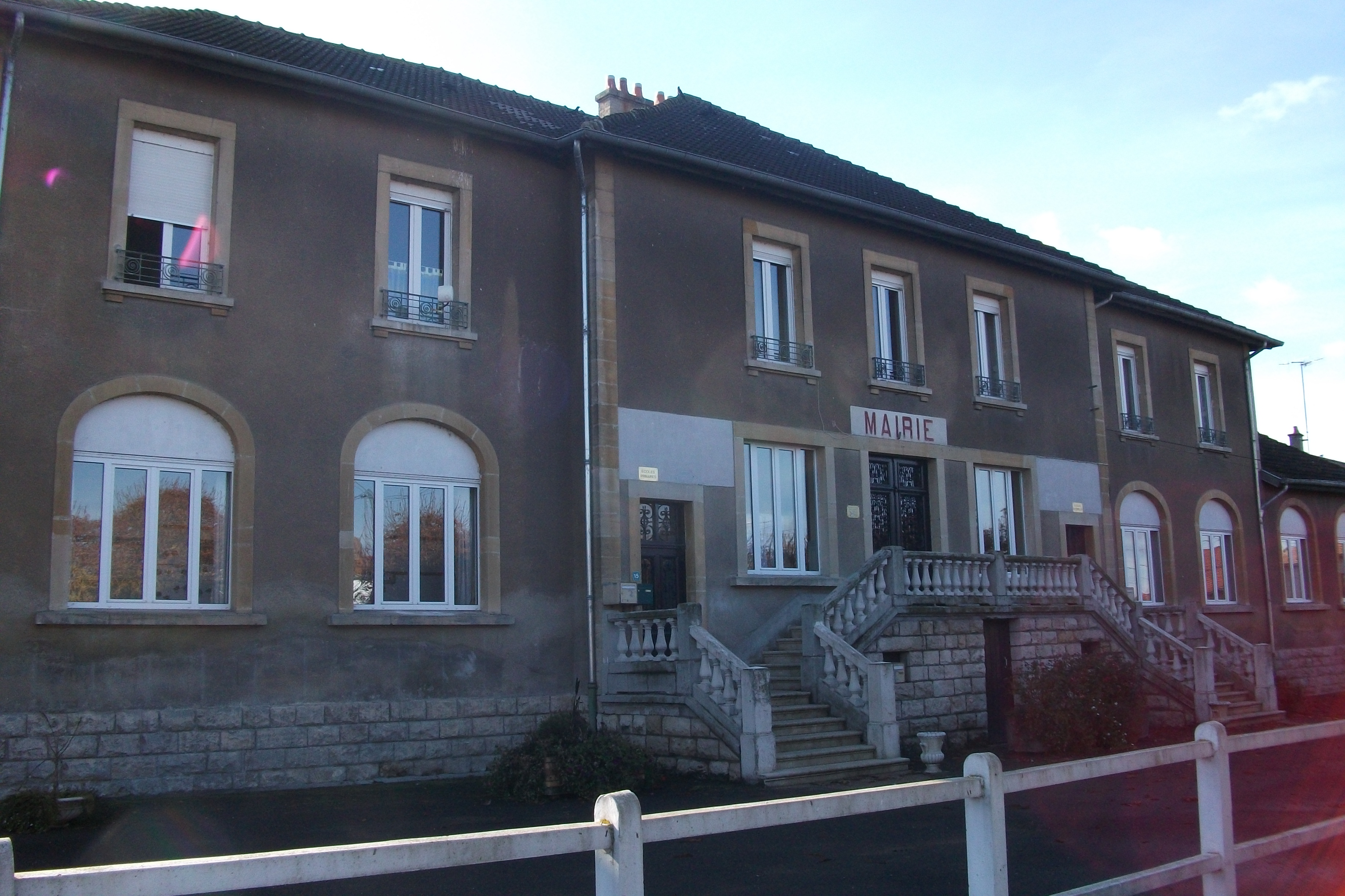
- The town hall in Buzy-Darmont

- Coat of arms
- Location of Buzy-Darmont
- Location within France Location within Grand Est
- Coordinates: 49°10′13″N 5°42′40″E
- Country: France
- Region: Grand Est
- Department: Meuse
- Arrondissement: Verdun
- Canton: Étain
- Intercommunality: Pays d'Étain

Government
  - Mayor (2020–2026): Fabrice Dupuis
- Area^{1}: 12.38 km^{2} (4.78 sq mi)
- Elevation: 196 m (643 ft)
- Highest elevation: 226 m (741 ft)
- Lowest elevation: 190 m (620 ft)
- Population (2023): 520
  - Density: 42/km^{2} (110/sq mi)
- Time zone: UTC+01:00 (CET)
  - Summer (DST): UTC+02:00 (CEST)
- INSEE/Postal code: 55094 /55400
- ^{1} French Land Register data, which excludes lakes, ponds, glaciers > 1 km^{2} (0.386 sq mi or 247 acres) and river estuaries.

Buzy-Darmont (French pronunciation: [byzi daʁmɔ̃]) is a commune in the Meuse department in Grand Est in northeastern France. It was created in 1973 by the merger of two former communes: Buzy and Darmont.

== Population ==
Historical population
Year	Pop.	±% p.a.
1968	460	—
1975	419	−1.32%
1982	495	+2.41%
1990	548	+1.28%
1999	558	+0.20%
2007	567	+0.20%
2012	569	+0.07%
2017	559	−0.35%
2023	520	−1.20%
Source: INSEE

== See also ==
- Communes of the Meuse department
