= Pareid =

- Commune
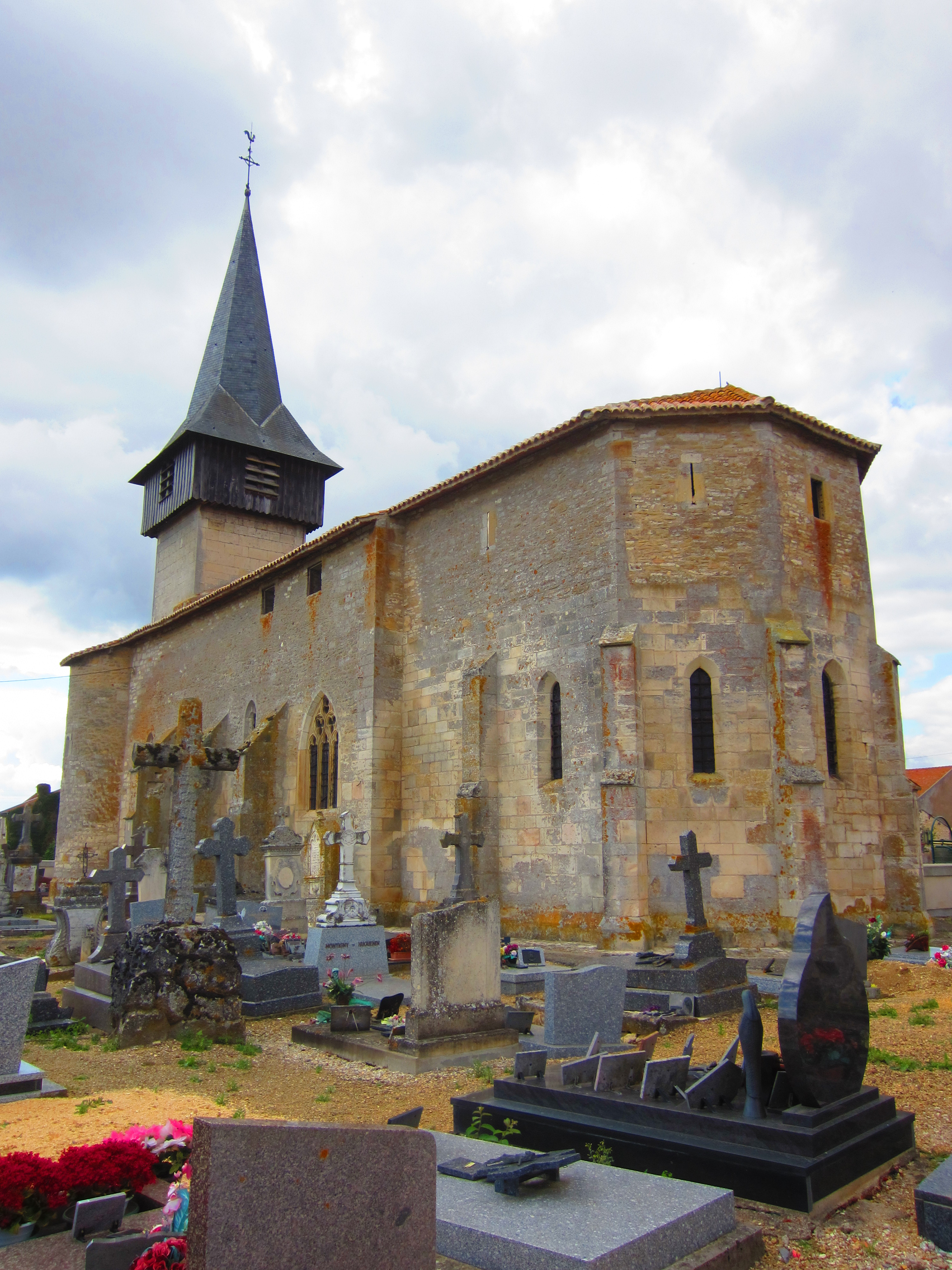
- The church in Pareid
- Location of Pareid
- Location within France Location within Grand Est
- Coordinates: 49°07′07″N 5°42′56″E
- Country: France
- Region: Grand Est
- Department: Meuse
- Arrondissement: Verdun
- Canton: Étain
- Intercommunality: Territoire de Fresnes-en-Woëvre

Government
  - Mayor (2020–2026): Christian Giannini
- Area^{1}: 7.02 km^{2} (2.71 sq mi)
- Elevation: 100 m (330 ft)
- Highest elevation: 225 m (738 ft)
- Lowest elevation: 197 m (646 ft)
- Population (2023): 110
  - Density: 16/km^{2} (41/sq mi)
- Time zone: UTC+01:00 (CET)
  - Summer (DST): UTC+02:00 (CEST)
- INSEE/Postal code: 55399 /55160
- ^{1} French Land Register data, which excludes lakes, ponds, glaciers > 1 km^{2} (0.386 sq mi or 247 acres) and river estuaries.

Pareid (French pronunciation: [paʁɛ]) is a commune in the Meuse department, in Grand Est, in north-eastern France.

== See also ==
- Communes of the Meuse department
