= List of aerial victories of Emil Thuy =

Emil Thuy (1894–1930) was a German First World War fighter ace credited with 35 confirmed aerial victories. After his initial aerial victory while flying with a reconnaissance unit in September 1915, he would not shoot down another enemy airplane until 16 April 1917. Assigned to a fighter squadron, Jagdstaffel 21, he would score 13 more victories by 22 September 1917. Transferred to command Jagdstaffel 28, he would shoot down an additional 21 enemy airplanes by war's end.

== List of victories ==
Victories are reported in chronological order.

This list is complete for entries, though obviously not for all details. Background data was abstracted from Above the Lines: The Aces and Fighter Units of the German Air Service, Naval Air Service and Flanders Marine Corps, 1914–1918, ISBN 978-0-948817-73-1, pp. 216–217, and The Aerodrome webpage on Emil Thuy . Abbreviations were expanded by the editor creating this list.

No.	Date	Time	Foe	Unit	Location
1	8 September 1915		Enemy airplane		
2	16 April 1917	1505 hours	Caudron		North of Berry-au-Bac, France
3	26 June 1917		SPAD		Cauroy, France
4	13 July 1917	2015 hours	SPAD		South of Avocourt, France
5	10 August 1917		Observation balloon	French observation company	Montzeville, France
6	17 August 1917	1200 hours	SPAD		South of Hill 304, France
7	19 August 1917	1100 hours	SPAD		Chattancourt, France
8	21 August 1917	1200 hours	AR2		Southwest of Avocourt, France
9	5 September 1917		SPAD		Bethelainville, France
10	7 September 1917	1040 hours	SPAD		South of Hill 304, France
11	11 September 1917		SPAD		Forges Wood
12	18 September 1917		Caudron		Le Mort Homme, France
13	18 September 1917	1430 hours	SPAD		South of Chattancourt
14	22 September 1917		SPAD		Hill 304, France
15	24 September 1917		SPAD		North of Hill 304, France
16	30 November 1917	1240 hours	Sopwith Camel		East of Ypres, Belgium
17	28 December 1917	1330 hours	Airco DH.4		Gheluvelt, Belgium
18	29 January 1918	1615 hours	Sopwith Camel		Poelkapelle, Belgium
19	18 March 1918	1250 hours	Sopwith Camel	No. 10 Naval Squadron, RNAS	West of Swevezeele, Belgium
20	8 May 1918	0815 hours	Airco DH.9		Zillebeke Lake, Belgium
21	14 May 1918	1915 hours	Sopwith Camel		North of Kemmel Ridge, Belgium
22	20 June 1918	1850 hours	Sopwith Camel	No. 209 Squadron RAF	West of Cerisy, France
23	28 June 1918	0905 hours	Sopwith Camel		Morcourt, France
24	4 July 1918	1415 hours	Sopwith Camel	No. 209 Squadron RAF	Southwest of Cerisy, France
25	14 July 1918		SPAD		
26	24 August 1918		Royal Aircraft Factory SE.5a		Tilloy, France
27	25 August 1918		Royal Aircraft Factory RE.8		Eterpigny, France
28	25 August 1918	Past noon	Sopwith Camel	No. 73 Squadron RAF	Courcelles, France
29	15 September 1918		Sopwith Camel		
30	16 September 1918		Royal Aircraft Factory SE.5a		
31	22 September 1918		Royal Aircraft Factory SE.5a		Vitry, France
32	27 September 1918	1210 hours	Royal Aircraft Factory SE.5a		Between Souchy and Couchy
33	5 October 1918		Enemy airplane		
34 and 35	14 October 1918		Enemy airplane		
