= Ewing E. Booth =

United States Army general

Major General Ewing E. Booth
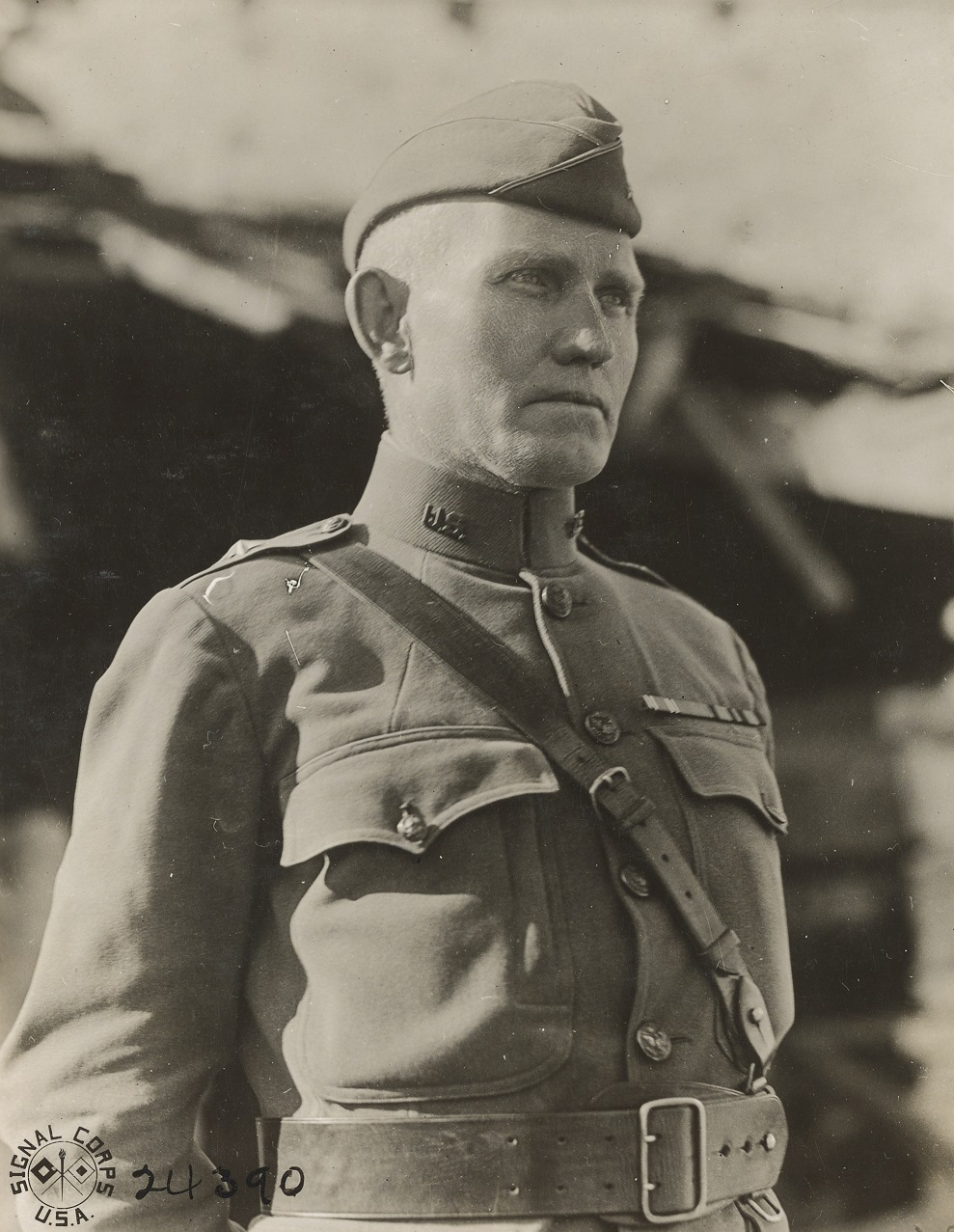
- Brigadier General Booth in Haudainville, September 1918
- Born: February 28, 1870; Bowers Mill, Missouri, US
- Died: February 19, 1949 (aged 78); Chevy Chase, Maryland, US
- Military career
- Allegiance: United States
- Branch: United States Army
- Service years: 1898–1934
- Rank: Major General
- Service number: 0-614
- Awards: Army Distinguished Service Medal; Croix de Guerre; Legion of Honour; Philippine Congressional Medal; Spanish War Service Medal

Ewing E. Booth (February 28, 1870 – February 19, 1949) was a general in the United States Army who fought in the Spanish–American War and World War I. He received several decorations for his service, including the United States Army Distinguished Service Medal and the French Croix de Guerre.

== Early life ==
Booth was born on February 28, 1870, to Nathaniel and Martha Bower Booth in Bowers Mill, Missouri. In 1892, he married Elizabeth "Lizzie" Williams; they were the parents of a daughter, Gladys.

== Military career ==
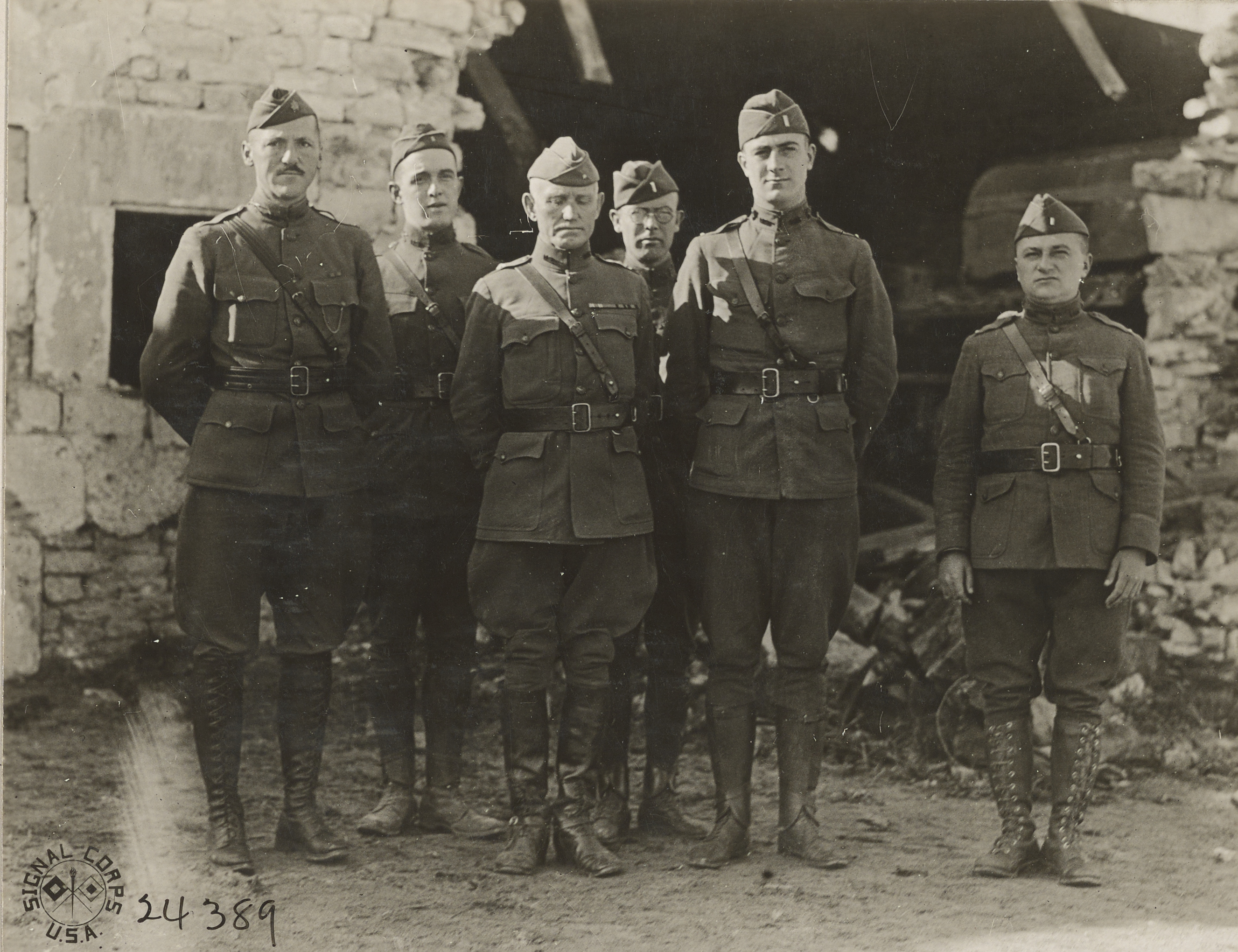
Brigadier General Ewing E. Booth, commanding the 8th Brigade, 4th Division, pictured here together with members of his brigade staff at Haudainville, Meuse, France, September 15, 1918. The brigades' adjutant, Major Charles C. Drake, is stood on the far left.

In 1893, Booth enlisted in Colorado National Guard as a private. In 1896, he received his commission as a second lieutenant. He served as a captain in the 1st Colorado Volunteer Infantry during the Spanish–American War and was honorably discharged on July 14, 1899. He was then transferred to the 36th United States Volunteer Infantry, where he served until March 16, 1901. On February 2, 1901, he became a first lieutenant in the 7th Cavalry Regiment. He graduated from the Infantry and Cavalry School in 1903, and transferred to the 10th Cavalry Regiment on August 22, 1904, as a captain. On May 11, 1905, he returned to the 7th Cavalry, and he graduated from the Command and General Staff College in 1905. From 1912 to 1915 Booth served as an aide to Major General J. Franklin Bell. He was assigned to the 1st Cavalry on October 15, 1915, and was promoted to the rank of major on May 15, 1917. Booth served as Chief of Staff of the Army's Eastern Department from June to August 1917, and became a lieutenant colonel on August 5, 1917. He was then assigned to the newly created 77th Infantry Division as chief of staff, becoming a colonel by February 3, 1918, and then a brigadier general on June 25, 1918.

During this period, Booth served as the commanding officer of the 8th Infantry Brigade of the 4th Infantry Division. He participated in the Second Battle of the Marne in July and August 1918, and the Battle of Saint-Mihiel in September. In September and October of that same year he led the 8th Infantry Brigade in the first phase of the Meuse-Argonne Offensive, for which he was later awarded the Army Distinguished Service Medal on July 9, 1919, the citation for which reads:

The President of the United States of America, authorized by Act of Congress, July 9, 1918, takes pleasure in presenting the Army Distinguished Service Medal to Brigadier General Ewing E. Booth, United States Army, for exceptionally meritorious and distinguished services to the Government of the United States, in a duty of great responsibility during World War I. General Booth commanded, with great ability and gallantry, the 8th Infantry Brigade in the operations which forced the reluctant enemy to evacuate Bois-du-Feys, Bois-de-Malaumont, Bois-de-Peut-de-Faus, and Bois-de-Foret in September and October 1918. His splendid leadership was an important factor in these actions.

After the armistice, Booth served with the American army of occupation in Germany until January 10, 1919. He then joined the Service of Supply as assistant chief of staff, and was promoted to chief of staff on June 20. The following day, Booth was given the additional title of Chief of Staff of all American Forces in France. On January 8, 1920, he was made deputy allied high commander in Armenia, and served in this capacity until June 30.

On July 1, 1920, Booth reverted to the rank of colonel of cavalry and returned to the United States to act as the assistant commandant of the Army's General Service School. He became the school's director in 1921, but left to become an instructor at the Army War College in 1923. After a year of teaching at the college Booth returned to active service, commanding the 4th Cavalry Brigade on the US-Mexico border, followed by the 1st Cavalry Brigade in Arizona. Booth was then commandant of the United States Cavalry School at Fort Riley, Kansas from July 1, 1925, to May 1, 1927, during which time he met and posed for a picture with Will Rogers. From 1927 to 1931 he served as assistant, then deputy Chief of Staff of the United States Department of War. Booth was given command of the 1st Cavalry Division on April 27, 1931, and was then assigned to the Philippines from January 31, 1932, to February 28, 1934.

== Death and legacy ==
Booth retired from military service on February 28, 1934, and moved to Los Angeles, California. After the death of his wife in January 1943, he moved to Chevy Chase, Maryland, to live near his daughter. He died in Chevy Chase on February 19, 1949, and was buried at Arlington National Cemetery.

== Bibliography ==
- Davis, Henry Blaine Jr. (1998). Generals in Khaki. Raleigh, North Carolina: Pentland Press, Inc. pp. 45–46. ISBN 1-57197-088-6.
