= Le Mort Homme =

Battlefield in World War I

Coordinates: 49°13′57″N 5°16′01″E

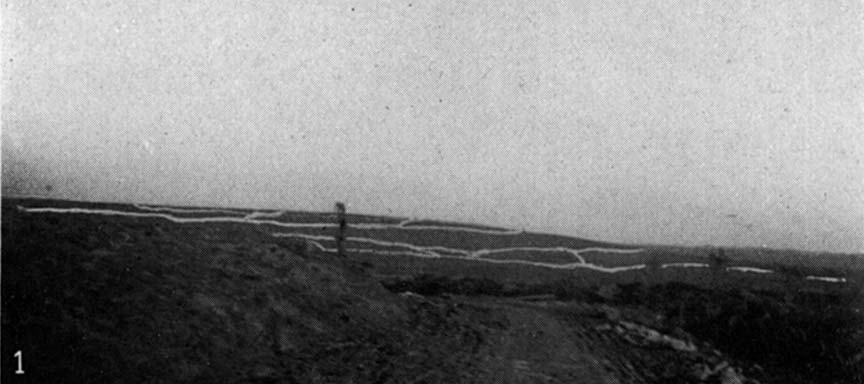
"Kelly's Corner" or "Strafen's Bend" on the Esnes road. Le Mort Homme and the first line German trenches are visible in the distance. A volley of shells is exploding in the field on the right.

The heights of Le Mort Homme (French pronunciation: [lə mɔʁ ɔm]) or Dead Man's Hill (German: Toter Mann) lie within the French municipality of Cumières-le-Mort-Homme around 10 km (6 mi) north-west of the city of Verdun in France. The hill became known during the Battle of Verdun during the First World War as the site of much fighting.

== Location ==
The hill has two summits which are named after their height in metres: the northern crest is Côte 265 and the southern one is Côte 295. These names were not used at the time, setting aside that modern survey has measured their heights at 287 and 280 metres respectively. It overlooks the villages of Béthincourt to the north-west, Crow Wood and Cumières to the east and Esnes to the south. The hill rises 1.55 km (1 mi) north of the village of Chattancourt. It was a great vantage point - the field of view from the hill in all directions was remarkable.

== History ==
In late February 1916, following German attacks on the right bank of the River Meuse during the Battle of Verdun, the French had established artillery batteries on the hills on the left bank commanding the opposite, right-hand bank. The French artillery caused so many casualties that the Germans decided to attack southwards along the left bank of the river simultaneously to capture Le Mort Homme and its neighbouring hills. Over the next few months, the Germans made repeated attacks, pounding the French lines, rushing their positions and ejecting the French from their wrecked trenches. French artillery would then pulverise the Germans and counter-attacks would drive them out again, the French infantry re-occupying the shell holes where the trench systems had been.

Despite the cost, the Germans had identified in March that the key to taking Le Mort Homme was Côte 304, which dominated the approach to Le Mort Homme and was able to fire on the Germans attacking the hill. German attacks on Côte 304 had begun on 23 March but the French defended it stubbornly, fighting off many attacks. On 9 April, the Germans launched a second assault on both hills, once again the French held and the attack failed. It was not until 6 May that Côte 304 fell, following a 36 hour bombardment that had begun on 3 May and bitter hand-to-hand fighting. On 24 May, the Germans took the second summit, Côte 295. Côte 265, labelled on German, but not French, maps as the Toter Mann (Le Mort Homme). After three months of bitter fighting Le Mort Homme was in German hands. The hills would be retaken by the French in August that year.

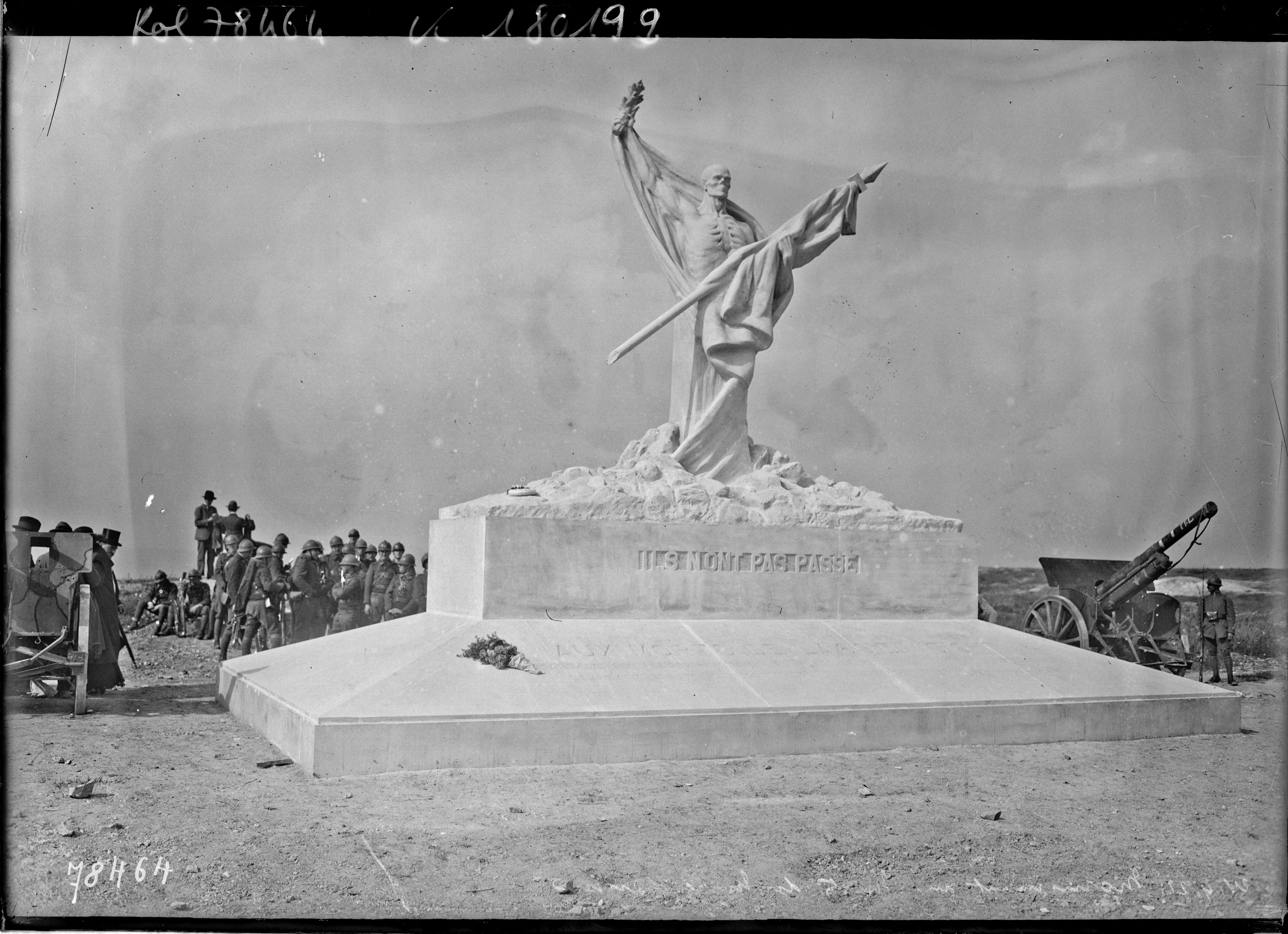
1922

== Today ==
Le Mort Homme rises 1.55 km (1 mi) north of the village of Chattancourt. From there it is accessible via road. On the summit is a memorial site with monuments, dominated by the 1922 skeleton sculpture by Jacques Froment-Meurice commemorating the French 69th Division. On the northern hillside are the remains of the German Kronprinz Tunnel (Gallwitz tunnel complex).
