= Dugny-sur-Meuse =

- Commune
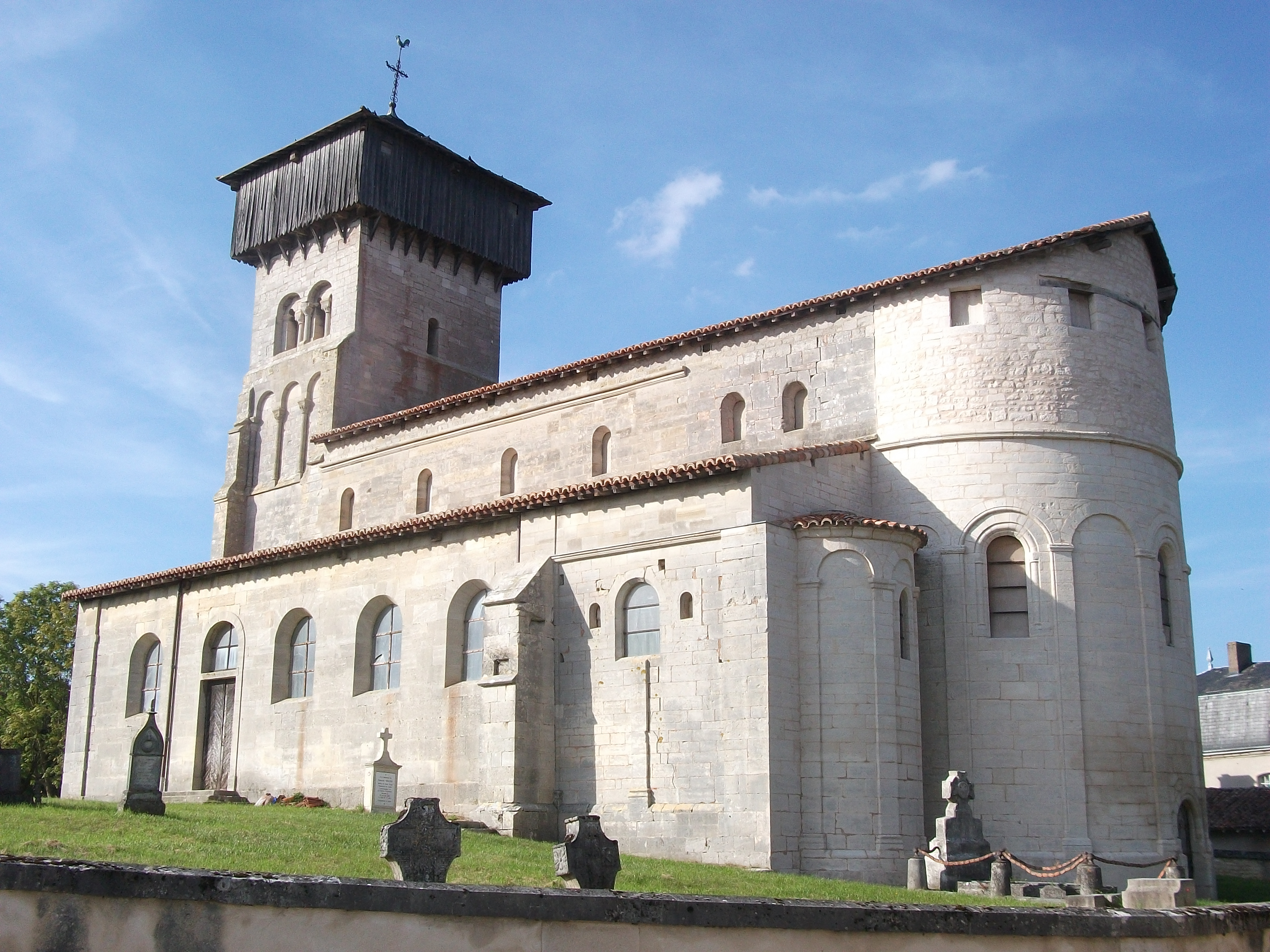
- The church in Dugny-sur-Meuse
- Location of Dugny-sur-Meuse
- Location within France Location within Grand Est
- Coordinates: 49°06′21″N 5°23′09″E
- Country: France
- Region: Grand Est
- Department: Meuse
- Arrondissement: Verdun
- Canton: Verdun-2

Government
  - Mayor (2020–2026): Fabricia Vol
- Area^{1}: 19 km^{2} (7.3 sq mi)
- Elevation: 210 m (690 ft)
- Highest elevation: 328 m (1,076 ft)
- Lowest elevation: 185 m (607 ft)
- Population (2023): 1,240
  - Density: 65/km^{2} (170/sq mi)
- Time zone: UTC+01:00 (CET)
  - Summer (DST): UTC+02:00 (CEST)
- INSEE/Postal code: 55166 /55100
- ^{1} French Land Register data, which excludes lakes, ponds, glaciers > 1 km^{2} (0.386 sq mi or 247 acres) and river estuaries.

Dugny-sur-Meuse (French pronunciation: [dyɲi syʁ møz], literally Dugny on Meuse) is a commune in the Meuse department in Grand Est in north-eastern France.

== See also ==
- Communes of the Meuse department
