= Canton of Verdun-2 =

Coordinates: 49.15°N 5.39°E

The canton of Verdun-2 is an administrative division of the Meuse department, northeastern France. It was created at the French canton reorganisation which came into effect in March 2015. Its seat is in Verdun.

It consists of the following communes:

1. Belleray
2. Belrupt-en-Verdunois
3. Dugny-sur-Meuse
4. Haudainville
5. Verdun (partly)
