= Belrupt-en-Verdunois =

- Commune
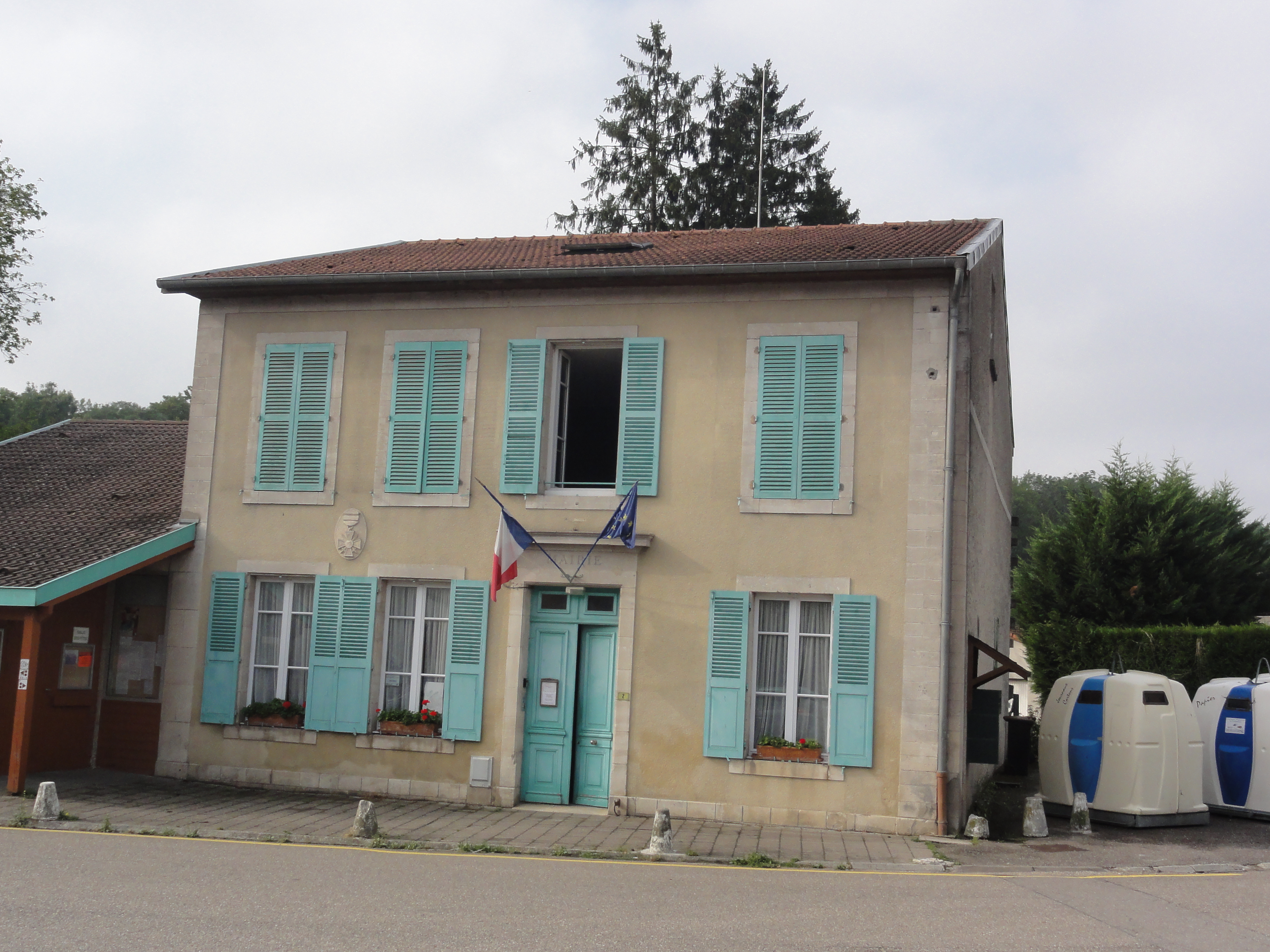
- The town hall in Belrupt-en-Verdunois
- Location of Belrupt-en-Verdunois
- Location within France Location within Grand Est
- Coordinates: 49°08′32″N 5°26′33″E
- Country: France
- Region: Grand Est
- Department: Meuse
- Arrondissement: Verdun
- Canton: Verdun-2

Government
  - Mayor (2020–2026): Bernard Gilson
- Area^{1}: 9.39 km^{2} (3.63 sq mi)
- Elevation: 215 m (705 ft)
- Highest elevation: 371 m (1,217 ft)
- Lowest elevation: 220 m (720 ft)
- Population (2023): 536
  - Density: 57.1/km^{2} (148/sq mi)
- Time zone: UTC+01:00 (CET)
  - Summer (DST): UTC+02:00 (CEST)
- INSEE/Postal code: 55045 /55100
- ^{1} French Land Register data, which excludes lakes, ponds, glaciers > 1 km^{2} (0.386 sq mi or 247 acres) and river estuaries.

Belrupt-en-Verdunois (French pronunciation: [bɛlʁy ɑ̃ vɛʁdynwa]) is a commune in the Meuse department in the Grand Est region in northeastern France.

== Population ==
Historical population
Year	Pop.	±% p.a.
1968	274	—
1975	313	+1.92%
1982	337	+1.06%
1990	456	+3.85%
1999	474	+0.43%
2007	436	−1.04%
2012	537	+4.26%
2017	572	+1.27%
2023	536	−1.08%
Source: INSEE

== See also ==
- Communes of the Meuse department
