= Communauté d'agglomération du Grand Verdun =

Grand Verdun
- Communauté d'agglomération
- Interactive map of Grand Verdun
- Coordinates: 49°11′N 05°22′E
- Country: France
- Region: Grand Est
- Department: Meuse
- No. of communes: {{{nbcomm}}}
- Established: 2015
- Area: 300.9 km^{2} (116.2 sq mi)
- Population (2019): 27,493
  - Density: 91.37/km^{2} (236.6/sq mi)
- Website: www.verdun.fr

Communauté d'agglomération du Grand Verdun is the communauté d'agglomération, an intercommunal structure, centred on the town of Verdun. It is located in the Meuse department, in the Grand Est region, northeastern France. Created in 2015, its seat is in Verdun. Its area is 300.9 km^{2}. Its population was 27,493 in 2019, of which 16,942 in Verdun proper.

== Composition ==
The communauté d'agglomération consists of the following 25 communes:

1. Beaumont-en-Verdunois
2. Belleray
3. Belleville-sur-Meuse
4. Béthelainville
5. Béthincourt
6. Bezonvaux
7. Bras-sur-Meuse
8. Champneuville
9. Charny-sur-Meuse
10. Chattancourt
11. Cumières-le-Mort-Homme
12. Douaumont-Vaux
13. Fleury-devant-Douaumont
14. Fromeréville-les-Vallons
15. Haudainville
16. Haumont-près-Samogneux
17. Louvemont-Côte-du-Poivre
18. Marre
19. Montzéville
20. Ornes
21. Samogneux
22. Sivry-la-Perche
23. Thierville-sur-Meuse
24. Vacherauville
25. Verdun
