= Vacherauville =

- Commune
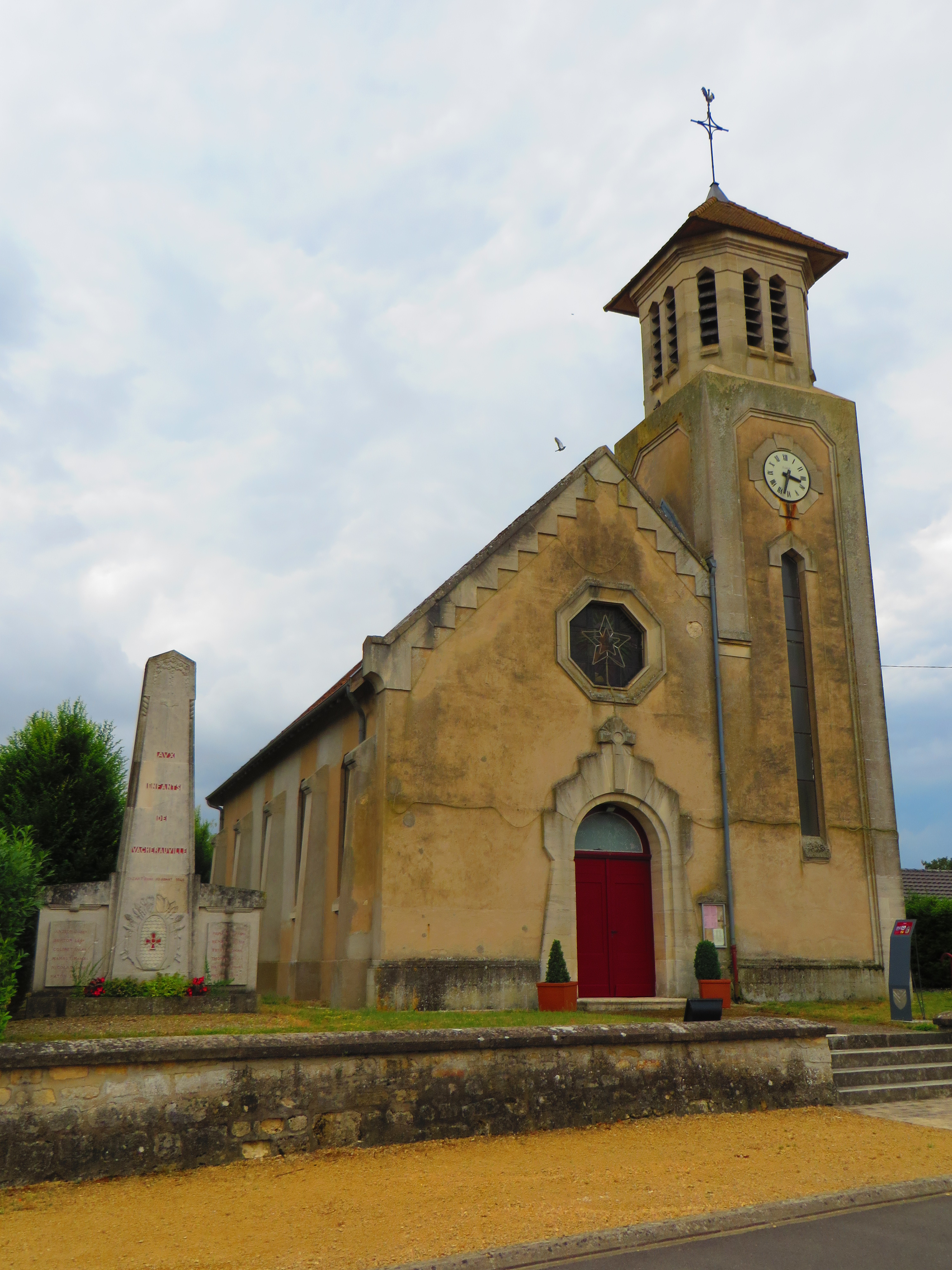
- The church in Vacherauville

- Coat of arms
- Location of Vacherauville
- Location within France Location within Grand Est
- Coordinates: 49°13′19″N 5°21′38″E
- Country: France
- Region: Grand Est
- Department: Meuse
- Arrondissement: Verdun
- Canton: Belleville-sur-Meuse
- Intercommunality: CA Grand Verdun

Government
  - Mayor (2020–2026): Jean-Christophe Vélain
- Area^{1}: 7.29 km^{2} (2.81 sq mi)
- Elevation: 194 m (636 ft)
- Highest elevation: 335 m (1,099 ft)
- Lowest elevation: 185 m (607 ft)
- Population (2023): 193
  - Density: 26.5/km^{2} (68.6/sq mi)
- Time zone: UTC+01:00 (CET)
  - Summer (DST): UTC+02:00 (CEST)
- INSEE/Postal code: 55523 /55100
- ^{1} French Land Register data, which excludes lakes, ponds, glaciers > 1 km^{2} (0.386 sq mi or 247 acres) and river estuaries.

Vacherauville (French pronunciation: [vaʃʁovil]) is a commune in the Meuse department in Grand Est in north-eastern France.

== Population ==
Historical population
Year	Pop.	±% p.a.
1968	133	—
1975	117	−1.81%
1982	138	+2.39%
1990	144	+0.53%
1999	119	−2.10%
2007	110	−0.98%
2012	154	+6.96%
2017	177	+2.82%
2023	193	+1.45%
Source: INSEE

== See also ==
- Communes of the Meuse department
