= Charny-sur-Meuse =

- Commune
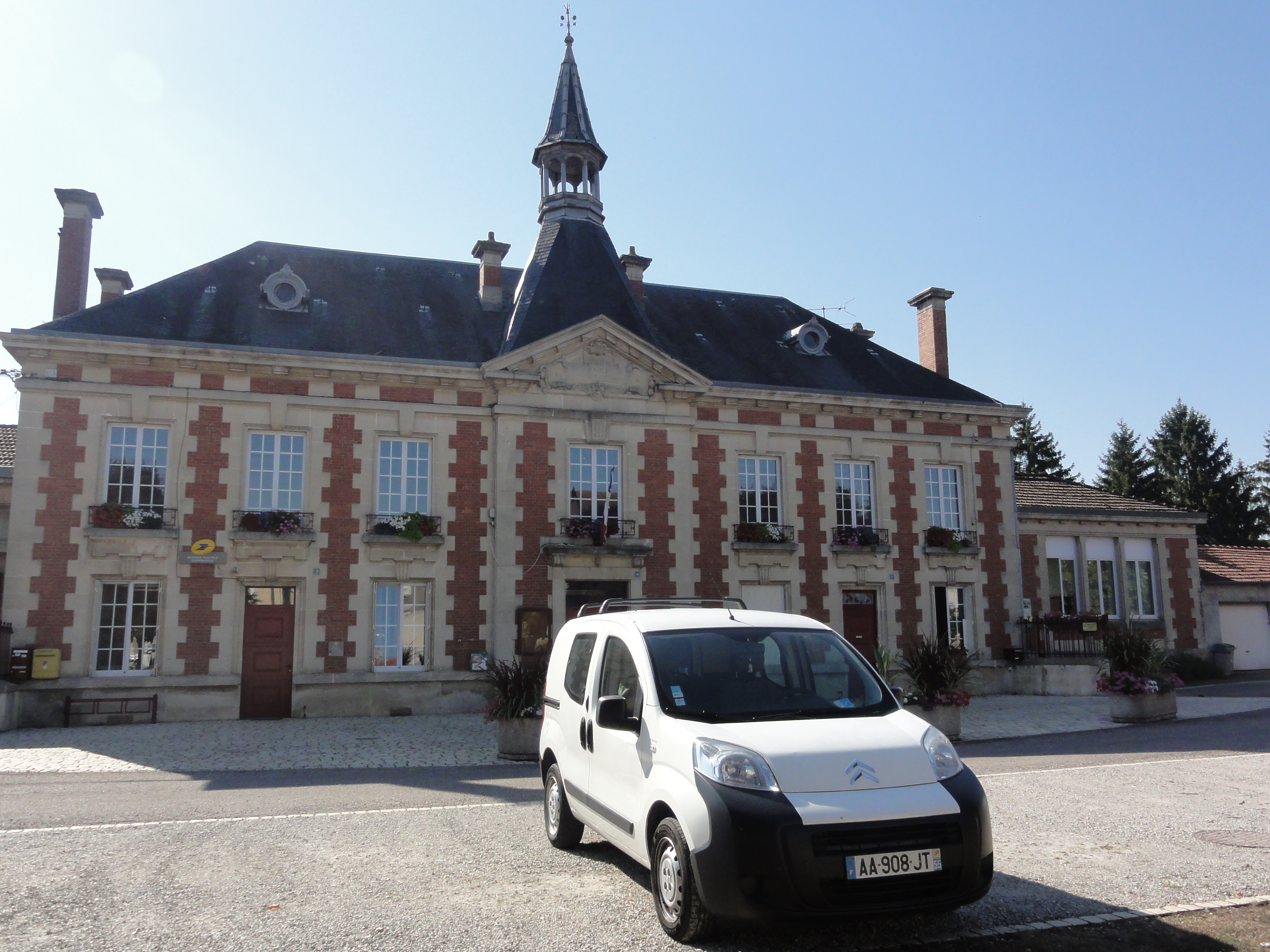
- The town hall in Charny-sur-Meuse

- Coat of arms
- Location of Charny-sur-Meuse
- Location within France Location within Grand Est
- Coordinates: 49°12′29″N 5°21′50″E
- Country: France
- Region: Grand Est
- Department: Meuse
- Arrondissement: Verdun
- Canton: Belleville-sur-Meuse
- Intercommunality: CA Grand Verdun

Government
  - Mayor (2020–2026): Catherine Pelissier
- Area^{1}: 12.62 km^{2} (4.87 sq mi)
- Elevation: 200 m (660 ft)
- Highest elevation: 293 m (961 ft)
- Lowest elevation: 185 m (607 ft)
- Population (2023): 522
  - Density: 41.4/km^{2} (107/sq mi)
- Time zone: UTC+01:00 (CET)
  - Summer (DST): UTC+02:00 (CEST)
- INSEE/Postal code: 55102 /55100
- ^{1} French Land Register data, which excludes lakes, ponds, glaciers > 1 km^{2} (0.386 sq mi or 247 acres) and river estuaries.

Charny-sur-Meuse (French pronunciation: [ʃaʁni syʁ møz], literally Charny on Meuse) is a commune in the Meuse department in Grand Est in north-eastern France.

== See also ==
- Communes of the Meuse department
