= Bras-sur-Meuse =

- Commune
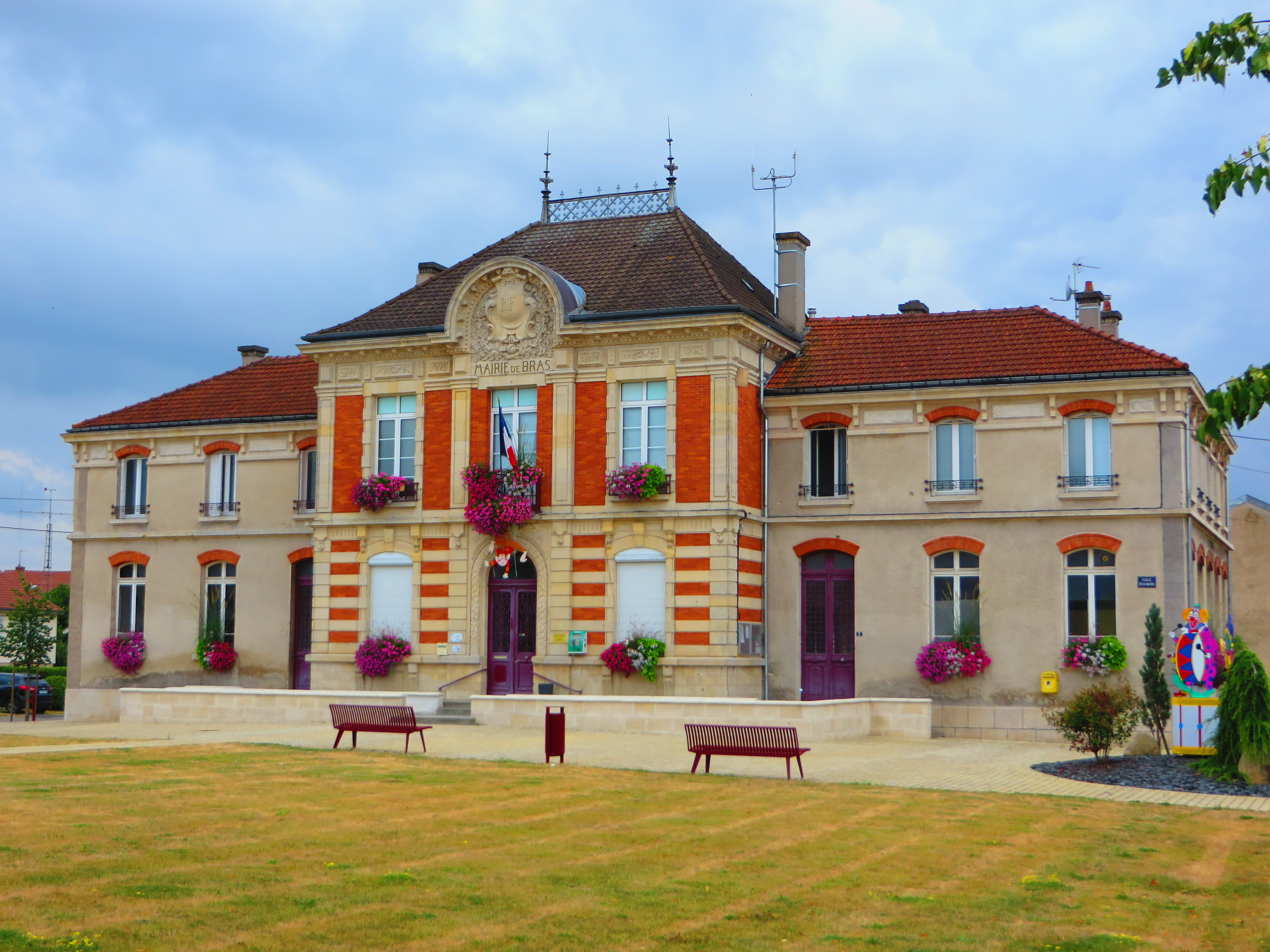
- The town hall in Bras-sur-Meuse
- Location of Bras-sur-Meuse
- Location within France Location within Grand Est
- Coordinates: 49°12′40″N 5°22′39″E
- Country: France
- Region: Grand Est
- Department: Meuse
- Arrondissement: Verdun
- Canton: Belleville-sur-Meuse
- Intercommunality: CA Grand Verdun

Government
  - Mayor (2020–2026): Stéphane Grzymlas
- Area^{1}: 13.69 km^{2} (5.29 sq mi)
- Elevation: 245 m (804 ft)
- Highest elevation: 360 m (1,180 ft)
- Lowest elevation: 189 m (620 ft)
- Population (2023): 661
  - Density: 48.3/km^{2} (125/sq mi)
- Time zone: UTC+01:00 (CET)
  - Summer (DST): UTC+02:00 (CEST)
- INSEE/Postal code: 55073 /55100
- ^{1} French Land Register data, which excludes lakes, ponds, glaciers > 1 km^{2} (0.386 sq mi or 247 acres) and river estuaries.

Bras-sur-Meuse (French pronunciation: [bʁa syʁ møz], literally Bras on Meuse) is a commune in the Meuse department in Grand Est in northeastern France.

== Population ==
Historical population
Year	Pop.	±% p.a.
1968	310	—
1975	483	+6.54%
1982	513	+0.86%
1990	486	−0.67%
1999	550	+1.38%
2007	686	+2.80%
2012	710	+0.69%
2017	698	−0.34%
2023	661	−0.90%
Source: INSEE

== See also ==
- Communes of the Meuse department
