= Sivry-la-Perche =

- Commune
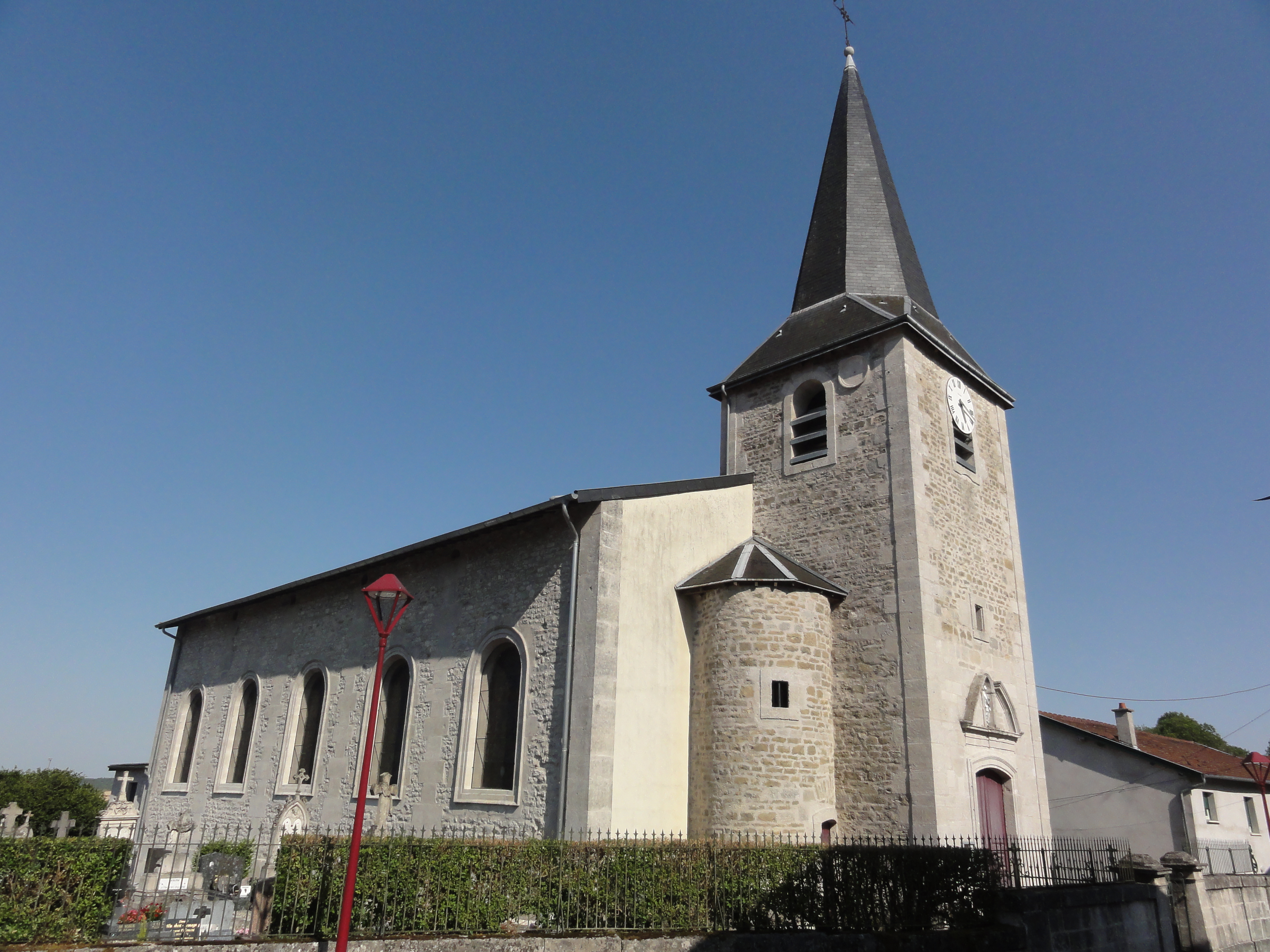
- The church in Sivry-la-Perche

- Coat of arms
- Location of Sivry-la-Perche
- Location within France Location within Grand Est
- Coordinates: 49°08′41″N 5°15′03″E
- Country: France
- Region: Grand Est
- Department: Meuse
- Arrondissement: Verdun
- Canton: Verdun-1
- Intercommunality: CA Grand Verdun

Government
  - Mayor (2020–2026): Mickaël Hirat
- Area^{1}: 12.17 km^{2} (4.70 sq mi)
- Elevation: 320 m (1,050 ft)
- Highest elevation: 352 m (1,155 ft)
- Lowest elevation: 228 m (748 ft)
- Population (2023): 279
  - Density: 22.9/km^{2} (59.4/sq mi)
- Time zone: UTC+01:00 (CET)
  - Summer (DST): UTC+02:00 (CEST)
- INSEE/Postal code: 55489 /55100
- ^{1} French Land Register data, which excludes lakes, ponds, glaciers > 1 km^{2} (0.386 sq mi or 247 acres) and river estuaries.

Sivry-la-Perche (French pronunciation: [sivʁi la pɛʁʃ]) is a commune in the Meuse department in Grand Est in north-eastern France.

== See also ==
- Communes of the Meuse department
