= Champneuville =

- Commune
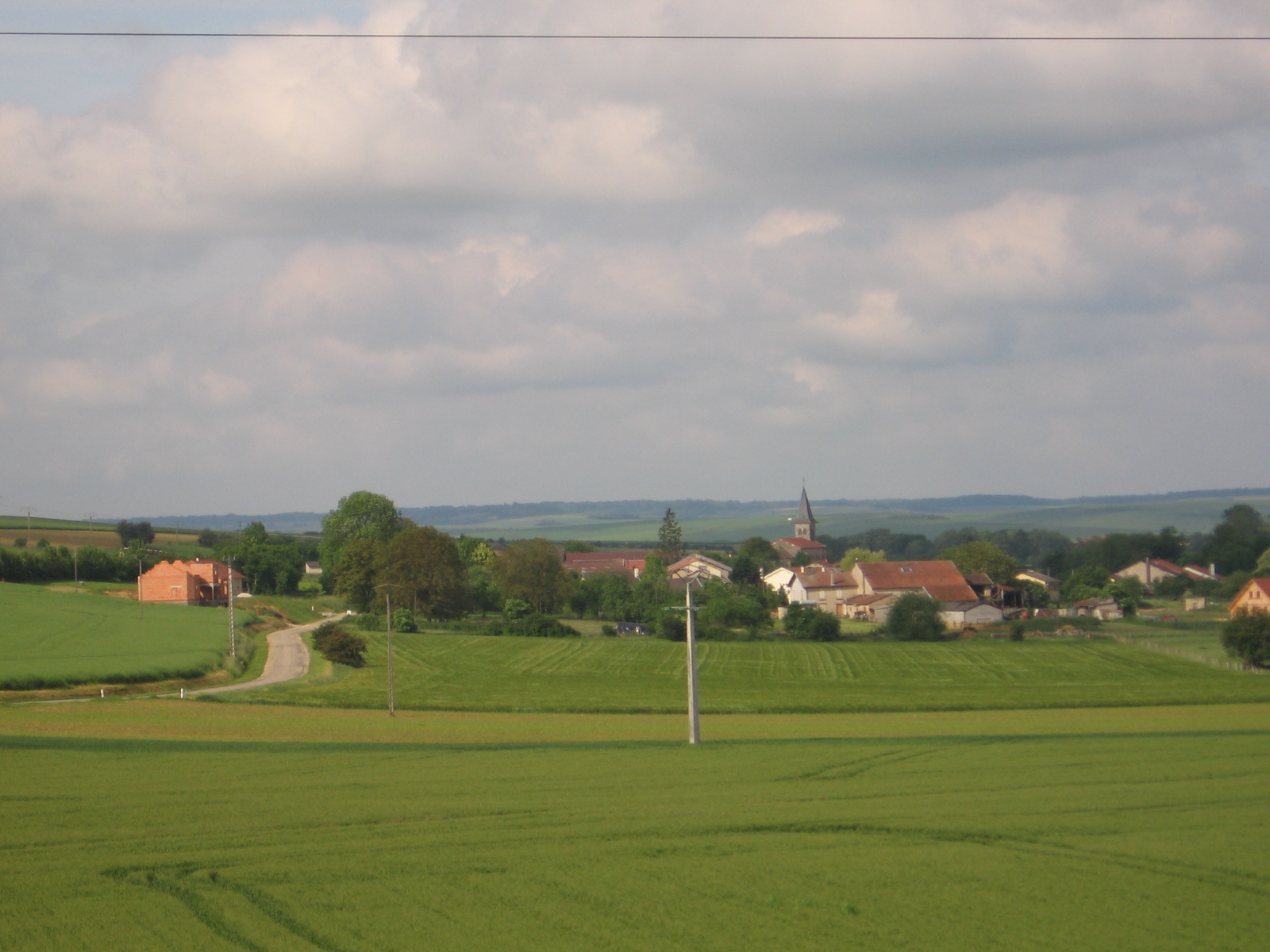
- A general view of Champneuville

- Coat of arms
- Location of Champneuville
- Location within France Location within Grand Est
- Coordinates: 49°14′15″N 5°19′38″E
- Country: France
- Region: Grand Est
- Department: Meuse
- Arrondissement: Verdun
- Canton: Belleville-sur-Meuse
- Intercommunality: CA Grand Verdun

Government
  - Mayor (2020–2026): Fabrice Beaumet
- Area^{1}: 11.99 km^{2} (4.63 sq mi)
- Elevation: 235 m (771 ft)
- Highest elevation: 337 m (1,106 ft)
- Lowest elevation: 181 m (594 ft)
- Population (2023): 115
  - Density: 9.59/km^{2} (24.8/sq mi)
- Time zone: UTC+01:00 (CET)
  - Summer (DST): UTC+02:00 (CEST)
- INSEE/Postal code: 55099 /55100
- ^{1} French Land Register data, which excludes lakes, ponds, glaciers > 1 km^{2} (0.386 sq mi or 247 acres) and river estuaries.

Champneuville (French pronunciation: [ʃɑ̃nøvil]) is a commune in the Meuse department in Grand Est in north-eastern France.

== See also ==
- Communes of the Meuse department
