= Fromeréville-les-Vallons =

- Commune
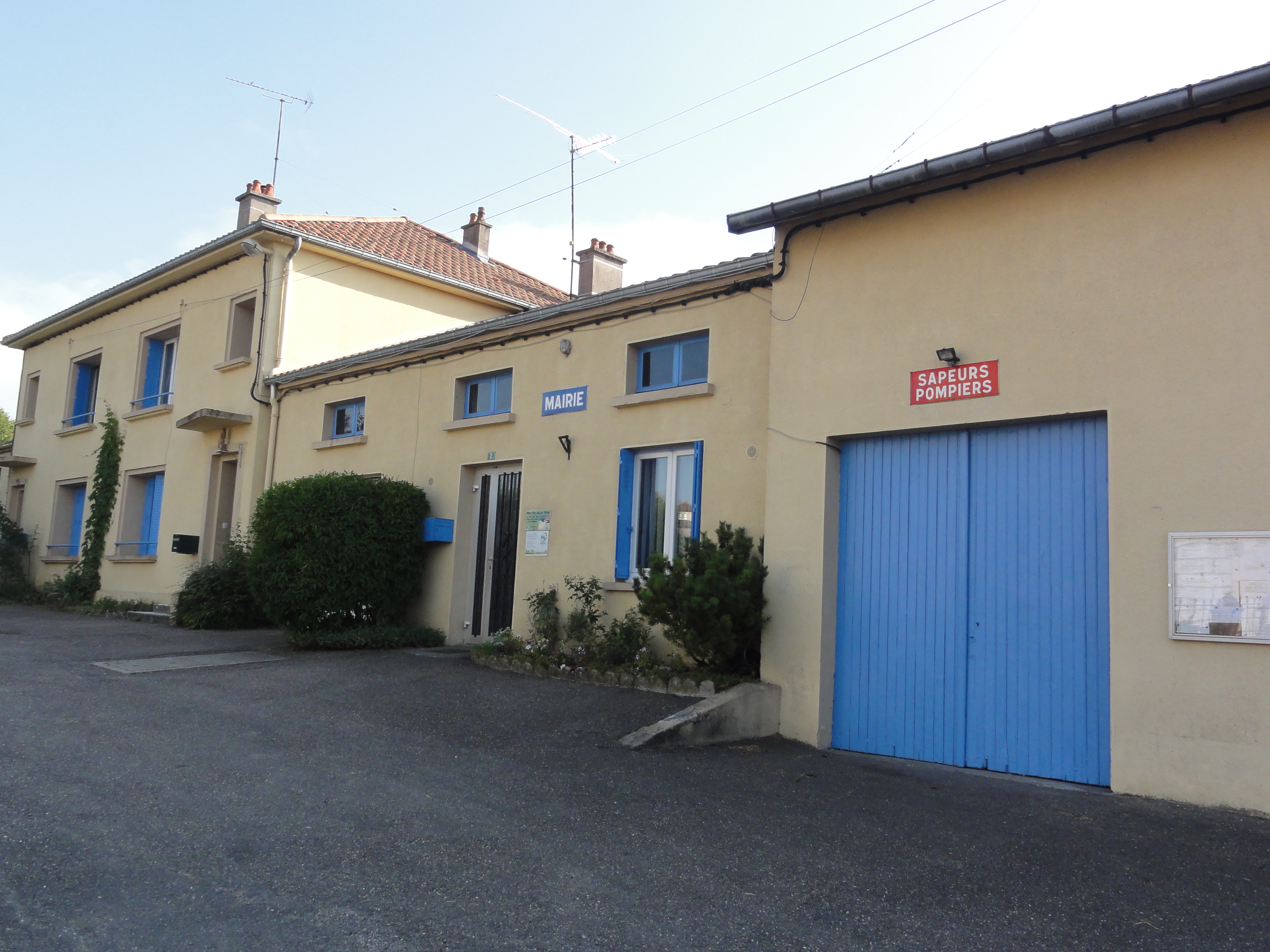
- The town hall in Fromeréville-les-Vallons

- Coat of arms
- Location of Fromeréville-les-Vallons
- Location within France Location within Grand Est
- Coordinates: 49°09′35″N 5°17′16″E
- Country: France
- Region: Grand Est
- Department: Meuse
- Arrondissement: Verdun
- Canton: Clermont-en-Argonne
- Intercommunality: CA Grand Verdun

Government
  - Mayor (2020–2026): Angélique Santus
- Area^{1}: 20.3 km^{2} (7.8 sq mi)
- Elevation: 230 m (750 ft)
- Highest elevation: 322 m (1,056 ft)
- Lowest elevation: 204 m (669 ft)
- Population (2023): 214
  - Density: 10.5/km^{2} (27.3/sq mi)
- Time zone: UTC+01:00 (CET)
  - Summer (DST): UTC+02:00 (CEST)
- INSEE/Postal code: 55200 /55100
- ^{1} French Land Register data, which excludes lakes, ponds, glaciers > 1 km^{2} (0.386 sq mi or 247 acres) and river estuaries.

Fromeréville-les-Vallons is a commune in the Meuse department in Grand Est in north-eastern France.

== See also ==
- Communes of the Meuse department
