= Béthincourt =

- Commune
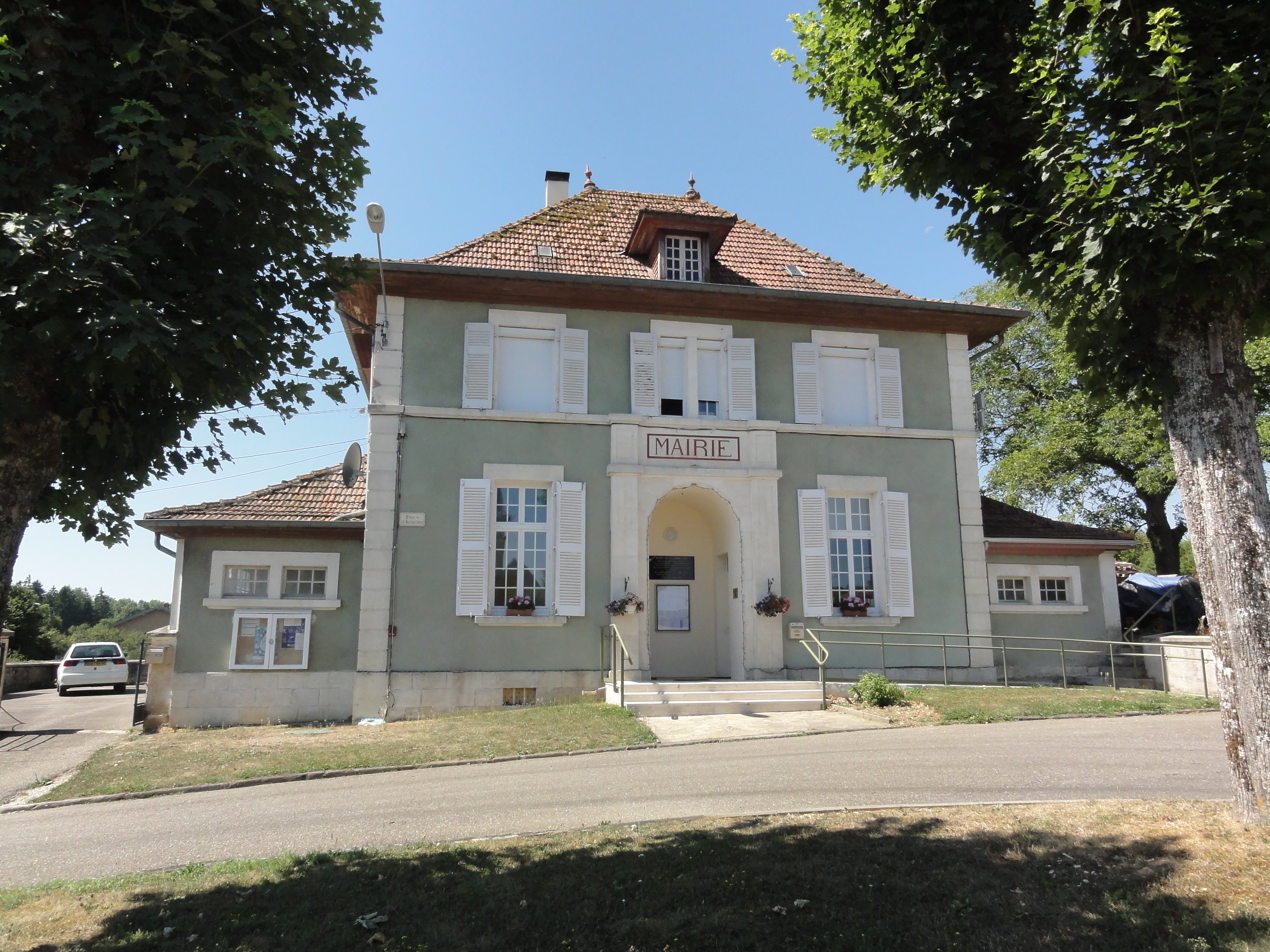
- Béthincourt town hall
- Location of Béthincourt
- Location within France Location within Grand Est
- Coordinates: 49°15′11″N 5°13′55″E
- Country: France
- Region: Grand Est
- Department: Meuse
- Arrondissement: Verdun
- Canton: Clermont-en-Argonne
- Intercommunality: CA Grand Verdun

Government
  - Mayor (2020–2026): Marie-Claude Thil
- Area^{1}: 13.32 km^{2} (5.14 sq mi)
- Elevation: 200 m (660 ft)
- Highest elevation: 282 m (925 ft)
- Lowest elevation: 193 m (633 ft)
- Population (2023): 50
  - Density: 3.8/km^{2} (9.7/sq mi)
- Time zone: UTC+01:00 (CET)
  - Summer (DST): UTC+02:00 (CEST)
- INSEE/Postal code: 55048 /55270
- ^{1} French Land Register data, which excludes lakes, ponds, glaciers > 1 km^{2} (0.386 sq mi or 247 acres) and river estuaries.

Béthincourt (French pronunciation: [betɛ̃kuʁ]) is a commune in the Meuse department in the Grand Est region in northeastern France.

== Population ==
Historical population
Year	Pop.	±% p.a.
1968	58	—
1975	39	−5.51%
1982	34	−1.94%
1990	25	−3.77%
1999	35	+3.81%
2007	23	−5.11%
2012	32	+6.83%
2017	35	+1.81%
2023	50	+6.12%
Source: INSEE

== See also ==
- Communes of the Meuse department
