= Montzéville =

- Commune
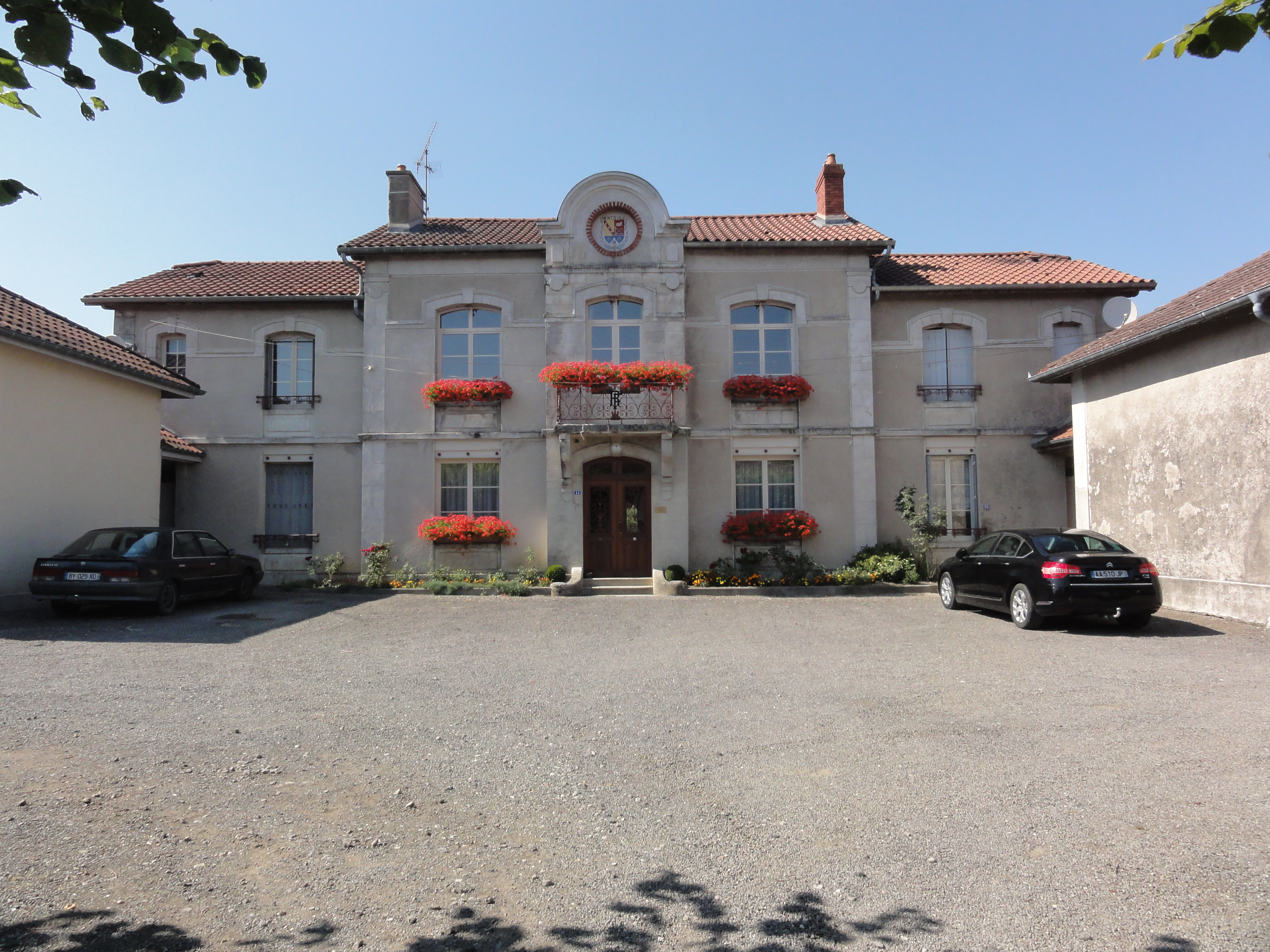
- The town hall in Montzéville

- Coat of arms
- Location of Montzéville
- Location within France Location within Grand Est
- Coordinates: 49°11′32″N 5°13′19″E
- Country: France
- Region: Grand Est
- Department: Meuse
- Arrondissement: Verdun
- Canton: Clermont-en-Argonne
- Intercommunality: CA Grand Verdun

Government
  - Mayor (2020–2026): Patrick Magisson
- Area^{1}: 17.65 km^{2} (6.81 sq mi)
- Elevation: 250 m (820 ft)
- Highest elevation: 322 m (1,056 ft)
- Lowest elevation: 209 m (686 ft)
- Population (2023): 152
  - Density: 8.61/km^{2} (22.3/sq mi)
- Time zone: UTC+01:00 (CET)
  - Summer (DST): UTC+02:00 (CEST)
- INSEE/Postal code: 55355 /55100
- ^{1} French Land Register data, which excludes lakes, ponds, glaciers > 1 km^{2} (0.386 sq mi or 247 acres) and river estuaries.

Montzéville (French pronunciation: [mɔ̃tsevil]) is a commune in the Meuse department in Grand Est in north-eastern France.

== See also ==
- Communes of the Meuse department
