= Haudainville =

- Commune
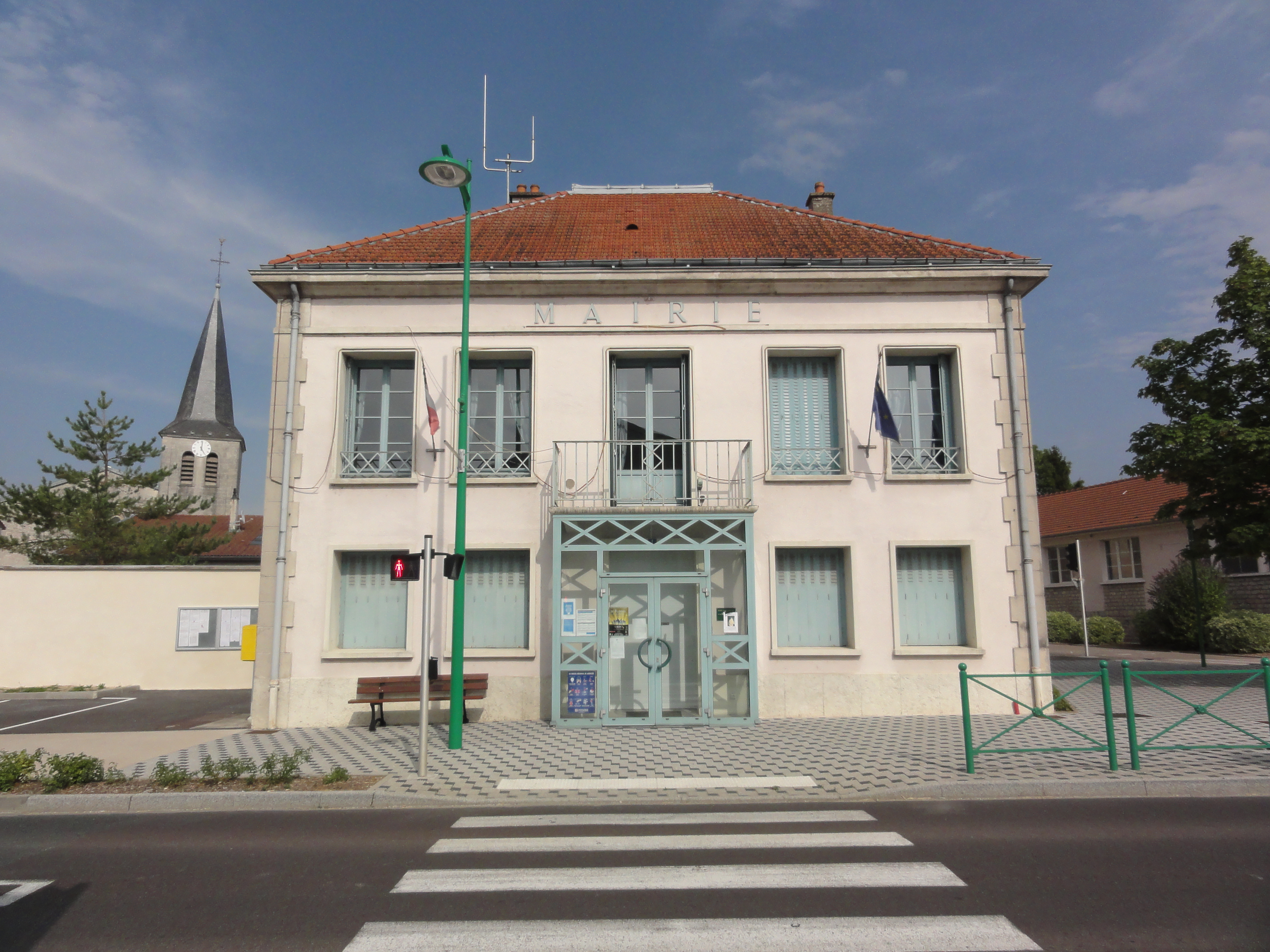
- The town hall in Haudainville
- Location of Haudainville
- Location within France Location within Grand Est
- Coordinates: 49°07′39″N 5°25′24″E
- Country: France
- Region: Grand Est
- Department: Meuse
- Arrondissement: Verdun
- Canton: Verdun-2
- Intercommunality: CA Grand Verdun

Government
  - Mayor (2020–2026): Patrick Lorans
- Area^{1}: 11.11 km^{2} (4.29 sq mi)
- Highest elevation: 363 m (1,191 ft)
- Lowest elevation: 196 m (643 ft)
- Population (2023): 930
  - Density: 84/km^{2} (220/sq mi)
- Time zone: UTC+01:00 (CET)
  - Summer (DST): UTC+02:00 (CEST)
- INSEE/Postal code: 55236 /55100
- ^{1} French Land Register data, which excludes lakes, ponds, glaciers > 1 km^{2} (0.386 sq mi or 247 acres) and river estuaries.

Haudainville (French pronunciation: [odɛ̃vil]) is a commune in the Meuse department in Grand Est in north-eastern France.

== See also ==
- Communes of the Meuse department
