= Béthelainville =

- Commune
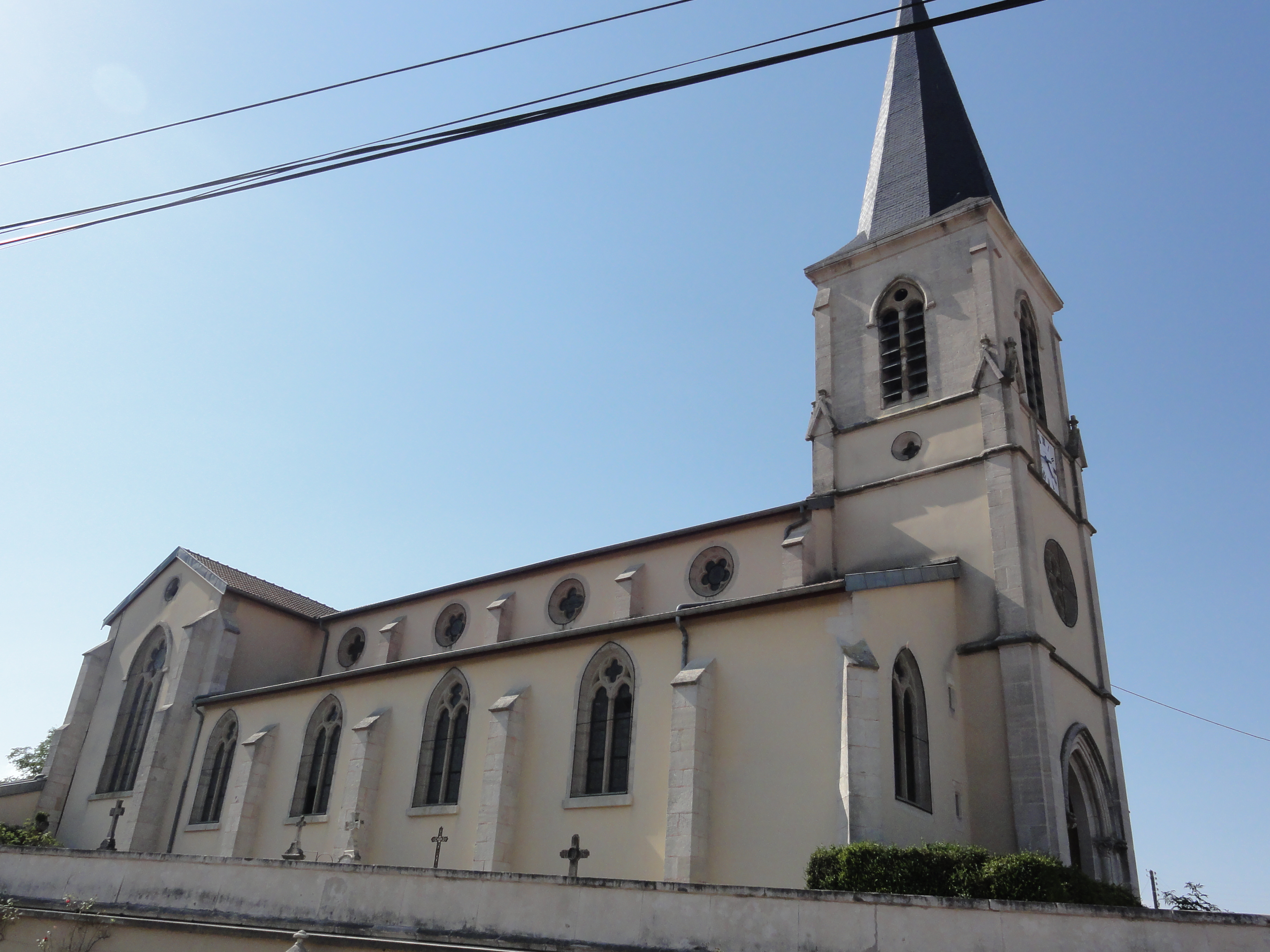
- The church in Béthelainville

- Coat of arms
- Location of Béthelainville
- Location within France Location within Grand Est
- Coordinates: 49°10′03″N 5°14′07″E
- Country: France
- Region: Grand Est
- Department: Meuse
- Arrondissement: Verdun
- Canton: Clermont-en-Argonne
- Intercommunality: CA Grand Verdun

Government
  - Mayor (2020–2026): Pascal Lefrand
- Area^{1}: 11.94 km^{2} (4.61 sq mi)
- Elevation: 268 m (879 ft)
- Highest elevation: 343 m (1,125 ft)
- Lowest elevation: 232 m (761 ft)
- Population (2023): 160
  - Density: 13/km^{2} (35/sq mi)
- Time zone: UTC+01:00 (CET)
  - Summer (DST): UTC+02:00 (CEST)
- INSEE/Postal code: 55047 /55100
- ^{1} French Land Register data, which excludes lakes, ponds, glaciers > 1 km^{2} (0.386 sq mi or 247 acres) and river estuaries.

Béthelainville (French pronunciation: [betlɛ̃vil]) is a commune in the Meuse department in the Grand Est region in northeastern France. It is located approximately 8 miles (13 km) west of the city of Verdun.

== Population ==
Historical population
Year	Pop.	±% p.a.
1968	182	—
1975	195	+0.99%
1982	195	+0.00%
1990	189	−0.39%
1999	177	−0.73%
2007	190	+0.89%
2012	187	−0.32%
2017	171	−1.77%
2023	160	−1.10%
Source: INSEE

== See also ==
- Communes of the Meuse department
