= Chattancourt =

- Commune
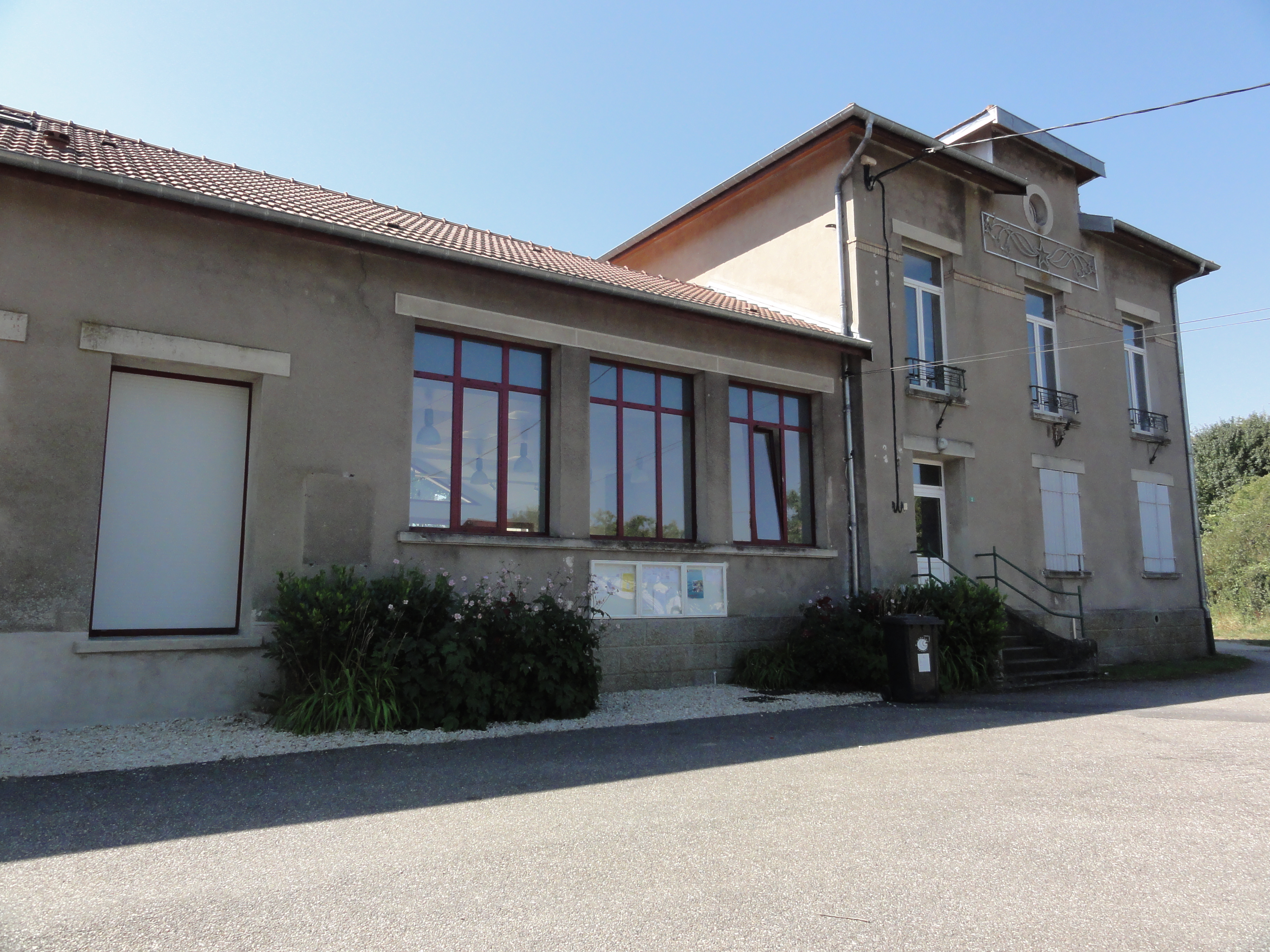
- The town hall in Chattancourt
- Location of Chattancourt
- Location within France Location within Grand Est
- Coordinates: 49°13′06″N 5°16′05″E
- Country: France
- Region: Grand Est
- Department: Meuse
- Arrondissement: Verdun
- Canton: Clermont-en-Argonne
- Intercommunality: CA Grand Verdun

Government
  - Mayor (2020–2026): Michel Poncelet
- Area^{1}: 10.36 km^{2} (4.00 sq mi)
- Elevation: 196 m (643 ft)
- Highest elevation: 283 m (928 ft)
- Lowest elevation: 185 m (607 ft)
- Population (2023): 175
  - Density: 16.9/km^{2} (43.7/sq mi)
- Time zone: UTC+01:00 (CET)
  - Summer (DST): UTC+02:00 (CEST)
- INSEE/Postal code: 55106 /55100
- ^{1} French Land Register data, which excludes lakes, ponds, glaciers > 1 km^{2} (0.386 sq mi or 247 acres) and river estuaries.

Chattancourt (French pronunciation: [ʃatɑ̃kuʁ]) is a commune, in the Meuse department, in Grand Est, in north-eastern France.

== See also ==
- Communes of the Meuse department
